= Catherine Stermann =

French actress (1949–1985)

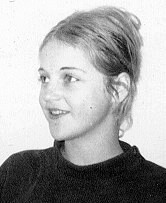
- Stermann in 1969
- Born: Catherine Anne Stermann; 18 September 1949; Poissy, France
- Died: 11 April 1985 (aged 35); Paris 6, France
- Resting place: Cimetière parisien de Bagneux
- Other names: Claude Stermann, Ophélie Stermann, Catherine Melo
- Occupation: Actress
- Years active: 1968–1985
- Relatives: Karl Meitmann (grandfather)

Catherine Stermann (18 September 1949 – 11 April 1985) was a French actress.

== Early life ==
She was granddaughter of the German Politician Karl Meitmann.

== Career ==
After having attended the actor's class of Armel Marin, she was a student at the Rue Blanche Theater School in Paris, where her teachers were among others Suzanne Flon, Daniel Lecourtois and Robert Manuel.

For some of her roles, she used the names and pseudonyms Catherine Melo, Ophélie Stermann and Claude Stermann.

== Death ==
Aged 35, she ended her own life at her apartment.

== Theatre ==
| Year | Title | Author | Director | Role | Theater | Notes |
|---|---|---|---|---|---|---|
| 1968 | Le Boulanger, la Boulangère et le Petit Mitron | Jean Anouilh | Jean Anouilh, Roland Piétri | Marie-Christine | Comédie des Champs-Élysées | |
| 1970 | Les Poissons rouges | Jean Anouilh | Jean Anouilh, Roland Piétri | Toto de Saint-Flour | Théâtre de l'Œuvre | As Claude Stermann |
| 1972 | Eugénie Kopronime | René Ehni | Jacques Rosny | Pingouin | Théâtre des Ambassadeurs | |
| 1972 | Identité | Robert Pinget | Yves Gasc | Une petite fille | Petit Odéon | |
| 1975 | On Purge Bébé | Georges Feydeau | Michel Galabru | | Galerie 55 | |

== Filmography ==
| Year | Title | Role | Director | Notes |
|---|---|---|---|---|
| 1972 | Le Temps d'Aimer | Simone | Christopher Miles | As Ophélie Stermann |
| 1973 | Le Sourire Vertical | | Robert Lapoujade | |
| 1973 | La Ligne de Démarcation | Barbe | Jacques Ertaud | TV series (episode: Mary) |
| 1974 | Les Gammas! Les Gammas! | Odile | Rüdiger Graf | TV series (for teaching French) |
| 1974 | La Logeuse | | Luc Godevais | TV movie |
| 1975 | Cousin, Cousine | Monique | Jean-Charles Tacchella | |
| 1978 | L'amour violé | | Yannick Bellon | |
| 1983 | La Fonte de Barlaeus | | Pierre-Henri Salfati | Short film, Jean Vigo Prize, as Catherine Melo |

== Bibliography ==
- Michel Stermann, My Maman Grete – An educator from Germany for orphans of Holocaust victims in France, TwentySix, 2018 ISBN 978-3-7407-4400-7.
