= Édith Scob =

French actress (1937–2019)

Edith Scob
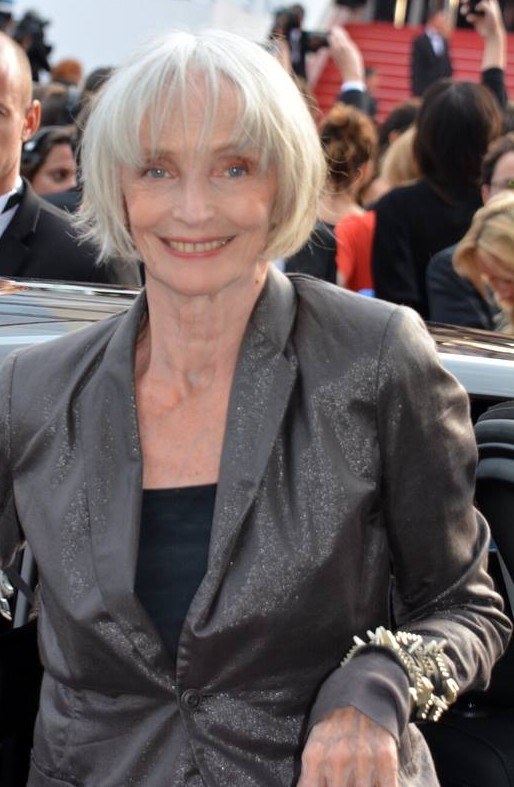
- Edith Scob at the 2016 Cannes Film Festival.
- Born: Édith Helena Vladimirovna Scobeltzine; 21 October 1937; Paris, France
- Died: 26 June 2019 (aged 81); Paris, France
- Years active: 1958–2019
- Spouse: Georges Aperghis
- Children: 2

Édith Scob (21 October 1937 – 26 June 2019) was a French film and theatre actress, best known for her role as the daughter with a disfigured face in Eyes Without a Face (1960).

== Early life and family ==
Scob was born Édith Helena Vladimirovna Scobeltzine, the granddaughter of a Russian Army general and White Russian émigré. Her father was an architect and her mother a journalist. Her elder brother, Michel Scob (1935–1995), was a French cycling champion and Olympian. At age 14, she underwent treatment for anorexia. Her love of literature inspired an interest in theatre. Scob was studying French at the Sorbonne and taking drama classes when she was cast in her first role.

She and her husband, composer Georges Aperghis, have two sons, Alexander (born 1970) and Jerome (born 1972), both writers.

Scob died in Paris on June 26, 2019. No cause of death was given.

== Career ==
Scob made her debut in theater in 1958 with the play Don Juan, but she gained a high profile early in her career when she appeared in the film Eyes Without a Face (1960). She was twice nominated for the César Award for Best Supporting Actress, for Summer Hours (2008) and Holy Motors (2012).

Following the civil unrest of the May 1968 events in France, Scob founded an avant-garde theatre in Bagnolet with her husband, composer Georges Aperghis, with the goal of introducing more culture to the most disadvantaged people.

== Theatre ==
Year	Title	Theatre
1958	Don Juan	Théâtre de l'Athénée
1959	L'Hurluberlu	Théâtre des Champs-Élysées
1960	Tartuffe	Théâtre des Champs-Élysées
1961	Le Square	Théâtre des Mathurins
1961	Clérambard	Théâtre des Champs-Élysées
1962	Les femmes aussi ont perdu la guerre	Théâtre des Mathurins
1963	Léonara	
1963	Spring '71	
1964	Lonely People	
1966	Live Like Pigs	Théâtre de l'Est Parisien
1968	La Nuit	
1968	Le Boulanger, la Boulangère et le Petit Mitron	Théâtre des Champs-Élysées
1969	Dear Antoine: or, the Love That Failed	
1971	La Tragique Histoire du nécromancien Hiéronimo et de son miroir	Festival d'Avignon
1973	Pandæmonium	Festival d'Avignon
1973	L'Appareil-photo	Théâtre National des Enfants-Vincennes
1974	Sa Négresse Jésus	
1974	Qui rapportera ces paroles?	
1975	Noëlle de joie	
1976	Camino Real	
1976	La Bouteille à la mer	
1976	Paysage de ruine avec personnages	Théâtre Récamier
1977	La Poupée Nina	Festival d'Avignon
1977	L'Aveugle de Bagnolet	Festival d'Avignon
1977	L'Aveugle de Bagnolet	Théâtre National de Chaillot
1977	Marchand de plaisir, marchand d'oublies	Festival d'Avignon
1977	Marchand de plaisir, marchand d'oublies	Théâtre National de Chaillot
1978	Miroir	
1979	Mugby Junction	Centre Pompidou
1980	Flaminal Valaire	Festival d'Avignon
1981	Mais on doit tout oser puisque	
1982	Elle et moi, émoi	
1982	De la cave au grenier, un corps entier de songes	Villeneuve-lès-Avignon
1983	Racine(s)	Festival d'Avignon
1984	Le Héron	Théâtre National de Chaillot
1984	The Seagull	Théâtre National de Chaillot
1984	La Ville Marine	Artistic-Athévains
1985	Interior	Théâtre Gérard-Philipe
1985	Exposition	
1986	L'Enfant-roi	
1986	La Tour de Babel, détails	Festival d'Avignon
1987	Inventaires	La Criée
1987	La Princesse blanche	Le Théâtre de l'Escalier d'Or
1988	Annie Wobbler	Théâtre des Ateliers
1988	Life a User's Manual	Festival d'Avignon
1988	Premières fiançailles de Franz K	
1989	Inventaires	
1989-90	The Lonely Way	Théâtre du Rond-Point
1990	Récital René Char	Festival d'Avignon
1990	When We Dead Awaken	National Theatre of Strasbourg
1991	Summer	Théâtre National de la Colline
1991	Portevoix	Théâtre National de Nice
1992	Chef-lieu	Théâtre Gérard-Philipe
1992	Chef-lieu	Théâtre Daniel-Sorano Toulouse
1992	Récital René Char	Festival d'Avignon
1992	H Litanie musicale et égalitaire	Théâtre Nanterre-Amandiers
1993	Où vas-tu Jérémie?	Festival d'Avignon
1993	Où vas-tu Jérémie?	Théâtre Gérard-Philipe
1994	Cousinons la cousine	Théâtre de la Bastille
1994	King Kong Palace o el exilio de Tarzán	Festival d'Avignon
1996	Le Menton du chat	
1996-97	Le Gars	Festival d'Avignon
1996-97	Le Gars	Maison de la Poésie
1998	Ghosts	Les Gémeaux
1998	Ardèle ou la Marguerite	Théâtre des Célestins
1999	Fantômas	Café de la Maroquinerie
2001	Habitations	Théâtre Ouvert
2002	A Midsummer Night's Dream	Théâtre Nanterre-Amandiers
2003-04	Wittgenstein's Nephew	Théâtre de l'Athénée
2004	Eva Perón	Théâtre de l'Athénée
2006	Loin de Corpus Christi	Festival de Théâtre Nava
2006-07	L'Éclipse du 11 août	Théâtre National de la Colline
2008	Olga	Théâtre Montansier
2008	Un couple idéal	Festival de Théâtre Nava
2008	A Room of One's Own	Artistic-Athévains
2009	I Married You for Fun	Théâtre de la Madeleine
2009-10	Der Stein	Théâtre National de la Colline
2010-11	The Master Builder	Théâtre Hébertot
2012	All That Fall	
2012-13	Inventaires	Théâtre de Poche-Montparnasse
2014-15	The Misanthrope	Théâtre de l'Œuvre
2015	Les Grandes filles	Théâtre Montparnasse

== Filmography ==
=== Cinema ===
Year	Title	Role	Notes
1959	Head Against the Wall	The crazy singer	
1960	Le bel âge	Edith	
1960	Line of Sight	Pascale	
1960	Eyes Without a Face	Christiane Génessier	
1962	Emile's Boat	Claude Larmentiel	
1962	The Burning Court	Marie D'Aubray Boissand	
1962	Thérèse Desqueyroux	Anne de la Trave	
1962	L'assassin est dans l'annuaire	Jenny	
1963	Judex	Jacqueline Favraux	
1964	Le père	The girl	Short film
1964	Fantasmagorie	The woman	Short film
1965	Thomas the Impostor	The nurse	
1965	Le passage	The woman	Short film
1968	Haschisch	The actress	
1969	The Milky Way	Virgin Mary	
1969	L'accompagnement		Short film
1970	Le détour	The woman	Short film
1971	Love Me Strangely	Sylvie Revent	
1972	The Old Maid	Edith	
1972	Requiem		Short film
1973	La tête	Voices	Short film
1974	Erica Minor	Marianne	
1976	L'acrobate	Valentine	
1977	A chacun son enfer	The mad girl	
1978	The Suspended Vocation	Angélique	
1982	A Thousand Billion Dollars	Madame Bronsky	
1983	One Deadly Summer	The doctor	
1989	Baptême	Rosalie Dauchy	
1989	Radio Corbeau	Madame Michel	
1991	Rue du Bac	Judith	
1991	On peut toujours rêver	Solange de Boilesve	
1991	Les Amants du Pont-Neuf	The woman in the car	
1993	La cavale des fous	Madame Toussaint	
1994	Joan the Maid	Jeanne de Béthune	
1995	Down to Earth	Edite	
1997	An Air So Pure	Mademoiselle Sophie	
1999	Time Regained	Oriane de Guermantes	
1999	Venus Beauty Institute	The stained woman	
2000	Fidelity	Diane	
2000	La Chambre obscure	The widow	
2001	Vidocq	Sylvia	
2001	Savage Souls	Funeral woman	
2001	Du côté des filles	Fanette	
2001	Comedy of Innocence	Laurence	
2001	Brotherhood of the Wolf	Geneviève de Morangias	
2001	Le mal du pays	Marco's mother	Short film
2002	The Code	Mireille	
2002	The Man on the Train	Manesquier's sister	
2003	That Day	Leone	
2003	Bon Voyage	Madame Arbesault	
2004	Un camion en réparation	Mathilde	Short film
2005	The Ring Finger	The Lady of the 223	
2005	The Lost Domain	Madame Chantal	
2006	Komma	Hélène Brückner	
2006	Ce que je vous dois	Solange	Short film
2007	Suzanne	Mado	
2007	Heartbeat Detector	Lucy Jüst	
2007	Echo	The guardian	Short film
2008	Didine	Madame Mirepoix	
2008	Summer Hours	Hélène Berthier	Nominated - César Award for Best Supporting Actress
2008	Des Indes à la planète Mars	Madame Mégevand	
2009	You Will Be Mine	Mademoiselle Lainé	
2009	Le garçon avec les cheveux dans les yeux		Short film
2010	Nova Eva	Eda Baykan	Short film
2011	The Long Falling	Madame Talbot	
2011	Un baiser papillon	Madeleine	
2011	Retour à Mayerling		
2011	A.A.Lapieski	Augusta	Short film
2012	Holy Motors	Céline	Nominated - César Award for Best Supporting Actress
2012	Argile	The Lady	Short film
2013	La cavale blanche	The voice	
2013	Par exemple, Electre	The choir and the corypheus	
2013	Eclipse	Lise	Short film
2013	Ennui ennui	Cléo's mother	Short film
2013	La trilogie française		Short film
2014	Gemma Bovery	Madame de Bressigny	
2014	An Eye for Beauty	Edwige	
2014	Les Yeux jaunes des crocodiles	Henriette Grobz	
2014	Taprobana	The ambassador	Short film
2015	Une famille à louer	Madame Delalande	
2016	Le Cancre	Sarah	
2016	Things to Come	Yvette Lavastre	
2019	Ni dieux ni maîtres	Laure's grandma	
2019	Love at Second Sight	Gabrielle	
2019	Amor maman	Edith	Short film

=== Television ===
Year	Title	Role	Notes
1961	Un homme de Dieu	Osmonde	TV movie
1964	Babek	Isabelle	TV movie
1964	Le rendez-vous	The young girl	TV movie
1965	La jeune fille Violaine	Violaine	TV movie
1966	Jeanne au bûcher	Joan of Arc	TV movie
1966	Le réveil de Rose	Rose Sansini	TV movie
1966	Spectacle d'un soir	The woman	1 episode
1967	La cigale	Olga Dymov	TV movie
1967	Adeline Venician	Adeline	TV movie
1967	Une aventure de Sherlock Holmes	Alice Brent	TV movie
1967	Les Cinq Dernières Minutes	Valérie	1 episode
1968	La Boniface	Claire Allandier	TV movie
1969	La librairie du soleil	Vélia	TV movie
1970	La mort de Danton	Lucile Desmoulins	TV movie
1971	Diabolissimo	Nora	TV movie
1972	Le grillon du foyer	Emma	TV movie
1973	Les écrits restent	Valérie Jubelin	TV movie
1973	Le jardin des héros	Augusta	TV movie
1975	Monsieur Jadis	The ex-Madame B.	TV movie
1975	Que voyez-vous Miss Ellis?	Miss Ellis	TV movie
1976	La poupée sanglante	Marquise de Coulteray	Miniseries, main cast
1976	La vérité tient à un fil	Madame Brasselier	Recurring role
1979	Le dernier mélodrame	Lilette	TV movie
1980	Médecins de nuit	Brigitte Sarnaude	1 episode
1981	Le sang des Atrides	The clairvoyant	TV movie
1981	La vie des autres	Jocelyne	1 episode
1982	L'ours en peluche	Mlle Roman	TV movie
1983	Casting	Charles's wife	1 episode
1991	La fable des continents	The ethnologist	TV movie
1992	Haute tension	Laura	1 episode
2000	La chambre des magiciennes	Madame Weygand	TV movie
2001	Les duettistes	Ève	1 episode
2002	Avocats & associés	Edwige Bardin	1 episode
2002–2011	Sœur Thérèse.com	Mother Superior	Main cast
2003	Caméra Café	Madame Bouvard	1 episode
2011	Une vie française	Claire Blick	TV movie
2012	Clara s'en va mourir	Clara's mother	TV movie
2016	Diabolique	Madeleine de Lassay	TV movie
2016	Accused	Colette	1 episode
2017	Transferts	Alexandra Staniowska	1 episode
