= Roland Piétri =

French actor and theatre director

Roland Piétri (1910 in Paris – 27 October 1986 in the same city), was a French actor and theatre director.

== Biography ==
Roland Piétri was co-director of the Comédie des Champs-Élysées from 1944 to 1948 with Claude Sainval and for one season (1946–1947), directed the Centre dramatique de l'Est based in Colmar (later moved to Strasbourg and renamed The National Drama Center in 1954). There he established a troupe with the comedians Françoise Christophe, André Reybaz, Catherine Toth. He then returned to the Comédie des Champs-Élysées and became theatre director of Jean Anouilh's plays.

== Theatre ==
=== Comedian ===
- 1937 : Julius Caesar by William Shakespeare, mise en scène Charles Dullin, Théâtre de l'Atelier
- 1942 : Faux Jour by Herman Closson, mise en scène Paulette Pax, Théâtre de l'Œuvre
- 1947 : Le Misanthrope by Molière, mise en scène Roland Piétri, Centre dramatique de l'Est Colmar
- 1951 : Siegfried de Jean Giraudoux, mise en scène Claude Sainval, Comédie des Champs-Élysées
- 1953 : L'Alouette by Jean Anouilh, mise en scène Roland Piétri et Jean Anouilh, Théâtre Montparnasse
- 1956 : Pauvre Bitos ou le Dîner de têtes by Jean Anouilh, mise en scène Roland Piétri and Jean Anouilh, Théâtre Montparnasse
- 1957 : Pauvre Bitos ou le Dîner de têtes by Jean Anouilh, mise en scène Roland Piétri and Jean Anouilh, Comédie des Champs-Élysées
- 1958 : Ardèle ou la Marguerite by Jean Anouilh, mise en scène Roland Piétri and Jean Anouilh, Comédie des Champs-Élysées
- 1959 : L'Hurluberlu by Jean Anouilh, mise en scène Roland Piétri, Comédie des Champs-Élysées
- 1960 : Le Tartuffe by Molière, mise en scène Roland Piétri and Jean Anouilh, Comédie des Champs-Élysées
- 1960 : Le Songe du critique by Jean Anouilh, mise en scène by the author, Comédie des Champs-Élysées
- 1966 : Becket ou l'Honneur de Dieu by Jean Anouilh, mise en scène Roland Piétri and Jean Anouilh, Théâtre Montparnasse
- 1967 : Pauvre Bitos ou le Dîner de têtes by Jean Anouilh, mise en scène Roland Piétri and Jean Anouilh, Théâtre de Paris
- 1969 : Dear Antoine: or, the Love That Failed by Jean Anouilh, mise en scène Roland Piétri and Jean Anouilh, Comédie des Champs-Élysées
- 1969 : Un ami imprévu de Robert Thomas after Agatha Christie, mise en scène Roland Piétri, Comédie des Champs-Élysées
- 1973 : The Waltz of the Toreadors by Jean Anouilh, mise en scène Roland Piétri and Jean Anouilh, Comédie des Champs-Élysées
- 1974 : Colombe by Jean Anouilh, mise en scène Roland Piétri and Jean Anouilh, Comédie des Champs-Élysées

=== Theatre director ===
- Le Chandelier and Un caprice by Alfred de Musset, Comédie des Champs-Élysées
- 1942 : Snouck by Philippe Frey, mise en scène with Claude Sainval, Comédie des Champs-Élysées
- 1944 : La Nuit de la Saint-Jean by J. M. Barrie, Comédie des Champs-Élysées
- 1945 : La Sauvage by Jean Anouilh, mise en scène with Claude Sainval, Comédie des Champs-Élysées
- 1945 : Candida de George Bernard Shaw, Comédie des Champs-Élysées
- 1946 : And Then There Were None by Agatha Christie, Comédie des Champs-Élysées
- 1947 : Le Survivant by Jean-François Noël, Centre dramatique de l'Est Colmar
- 1947 : Les Folies amoureuses by Jean-François Regnard, Centre dramatique de l'Est Colmar
- 1947 : Le Misanthrope by Molière, Centre dramatique de l'Est Colmar
- 1948 : Ardèle ou la Marguerite by Jean Anouilh, Comédie des Champs-Élysées
- 1950 : Va faire un tour au bois by Roger Dornès, Théâtre Gramont
- 1950 : La mariée est trop belle by Michel Duran, Théâtre Saint-Georges
- 1951 : Les Innocents by William Archibald, Théâtre Édouard VII
- 1952 : La Grande Roue de Guillaume Hanoteau, Théâtre Saint-Georges
- 1952 : The Waltz of the Toreadors by Jean Anouilh, Comédie des Champs-Élysées
- 1952 : La Grande Oreille by Guillaume Hanoteau, Théâtre Saint-Georges
- 1953 : L'Alouette by Jean Anouilh, mise en scène with the author, Théâtre Montparnasse
- 1954 : Cécile ou l'École des pères by Jean Anouilh, Comédie des Champs-Élysées
- 1955 : Ornifle ou le Courant d'air by Jean Anouilh, mise en scène with the author, Comédie des Champs-Élysées
- 1956 : Pauvre Bitos ou le Dîner de têtes by Jean Anouilh, mise en scène with the author, Théâtre Montparnasse
- 1957 : Pauvre Bitos ou le Dîner de têtes by Jean Anouilh, directed by the author, Comédie des Champs-Élysées
- 1958 : Candida de George Bernard Shaw, Théâtre Daunou
- 1958 : Ardèle ou la Marguerite by Jean Anouilh, mise en scène with the author, Comédie des Champs-Élysées
- 1959 : L'Hurluberlu by Jean Anouilh, Comédie des Champs-Élysées
- 1959 : Becket ou l'Honneur de Dieu by Jean Anouilh, mise en scène with the author, Théâtre Montparnasse
- 1960 : Le Tartuffe by Molière, Comédie des Champs-Élysées
- 1961 : La Grotte by Jean Anouilh, mise en scène with th author, Théâtre Montparnasse
- 1962 : L'Orchestre by Jean Anouilh, mise en scène with the author, Comédie des Champs-Élysées
- 1962 : La Foire d'empoigne by Jean Anouilh, mise en scène with the author, Comédie des Champs-Élysées
- 1962 : Victor ou les Enfants au pouvoir by Roger Vitrac, mise en scène with Jean Anouilh, Théâtre de l'Ambigu
- 1963 : Victor ou les Enfants au pouvoir by Roger Vitrac, mise en scène with Jean Anouilh, Théâtre de l'Athénée
- 1963 : L'Acheteuse by Steve Passeur, mise en scène with Jean Anouilh, Comédie des Champs-Élysées
- 1964 : Richard III by Shakespeare, mise en scène with Jean Anouilh, Théâtre Montparnasse
- 1965 : L'Acheteuse by Steve Passeur, mise en scène with Jean Anouilh, Comédie des Champs-Élysées
- 1966 : Das Käthchen von Heilbronn by Heinrich von Kleist, mise en scène xith Jean Anouilh, Théâtre Montparnasse
- 1966 : Becket ou l'Honneur de Dieu by Jean Anouilh, mise en scène with the author, Théâtre Montparnasse
- 1967 : Pauvre Bitos ou le Dîner de têtes by Jean Anouilh, mise en scène with the author, Théâtre de Paris
- 1968 : L'Alouette by Jean Anouilh, mise en scène with the author, Théâtre de Paris
- 1968 : Le Boulanger, la Boulangère et le Petit Mitron by Jean Anouilh, mise en scène with the author, Comédie des Champs-Élysées
- 1969 : Un ami imprévu by Robert Thomas after Agatha Christie, Comédie des Champs-Élysées
- 1969 : L'Ascenseur électrique by Julien Vartet, Théâtre de la Renaissance
- 1969 : Dear Antoine: or, the Love That Failed by Jean Anouilh, mise en scène with the author, Comédie des Champs-Élysées
- 1970 : Ne réveillez pas Madame by Jean Anouilh, mise en scène with the author, Comédie des Champs-Élysées
- 1970 : Les Poissons rouges by Jean Anouilh, mise en scène with the author, Théâtre de l'Œuvre
- 1971 : Becket ou l'Honneur de Dieu by Jean Anouilh, Comédie-Française
- 1972 : Tu étais si gentil quand tu étais petit by Jean Anouilh, mise en scène with the author, Théâtre Antoine
- 1972 : Le Directeur de l'Opéra by Jean Anouilh, mise en scène with the author, Comédie des Champs-Élysées
- 1973 : The Waltz of the Toreadors by Jean Anouilh, mise en scène with the author, Comédie des Champs-Élysées
- 1974 : Colombe by Jean Anouilh, mise en scène with the author, Comédie des Champs-Élysées
- 1975 : L'Arrestation by Jean Anouilh, mise en scène with the author, Théâtre de l'Athénée
- 1976 : Chers zoiseaux by Jean Anouilh, mise en scène with the author, Comédie des Champs-Élysées
- 1976 : Le Scénario by Jean Anouilh, mise en scène with the author, Théâtre de l'Œuvre
- 1978 : La Culotte by Jean Anouilh, mise en scène with th author, Théâtre de l'Atelier
- 1979 : Ardèle ou la Marguerite by Jean Anouilh, mise en scène with Pierre Mondy, Théâtre Hébertot
- 1981 : Le Nombril by Jean Anouilh, mise en scène with the author, Théâtre de l'Atelier

== Filmography ==
Cinrma

- 1938 : Entrée des artistes by Marc Allégret
- 1956 : Les Aventures de Till L'Espiègle by Gérard Philipe

Television

- 1969 : Au théâtre ce soir : Un ami imprévu by Robert Thomas after Agatha Christie, mise en scène Roland Piétri, TV director Pierre Sabbagh, Théâtre Marigny
