= Les Chemins de l'amour =

1940 waltz sung by Francis Poulenc

"Les Chemins de l'Amour"
- sung waltz by Francis Poulenc
- English: The Ways of Love
- Catalogue: FP 106-Ia and 106-Ib
- Text: by Jean Anouilh
- Language: French
- Composed: Oct. 1940
- Dedication: Yvonne Printemps

Premiere
- Date: 28 November 1940
- Location: Théâtre de la Michodière, Paris

"Les Chemins de l'Amour" ("The Ways of Love") is a 1940 valse chantée, or sung waltz, by Francis Poulenc to lyrics by Jean Anouilh. It was written for soprano voice as part of Poulenc's incidental music for Anouilh's new play Léocadia and exists with two accompaniments: piano only (catalogue FP 106-Ia) and chamber ensemble (cat. FP 106-Ib).

== Genesis ==
Composed in October 1940, the song is dedicated to the comedian and singer Yvonne Printemps, who sang it at the premiere of the play Léocadia on 1 December 1940. The song was somewhat successful, and Printemps recorded it.

Max Eschig published the score in 1945.

== Discography ==
- Yvonne Printemps and Marcel Cariven (conducting).
- André Schlesser and Georges Delerue (conducting). Grand Prix du disque.
- Felicity Lott (soprano) and Graham Johnson (piano) - Hyperion.
- Jessye Norman (soprano) and Dalton Baldwin (piano) - Philips.
- Véronique Gens (soprano) and Roger Vignoles (piano) - Erato.
- Patricia Petibon (soprano), Christian-Pierre La Marca (cello), Amandine Savary (piano) - Sony.
- Sophie Karthäuser (soprano), Eugène Asti (piano) - Harmonia Mundi
- Mischa Maisky (cello), Daria Havora (piano) - Deutsche Grammophon
