= Ardèle =

1948 play written by Jean Anouilh

- Original title: Ardèle ou la Marguerite
- Original language: French
- Written by: Jean Anouilh
- Characters: The General; His Wife; The Count; The Countess; Villardieu; Nicholas; Nathalie; Toto; Marie-Christine; Ada
- Mute: The Hunchback
- Setting: 1912 or thereabouts

Premiere
- Date: November 4, 1948
- Place: Comédie des Champs-Élysées
- Directed by: Roland Piétri

Ardèle (Ardèle ou la Marguerite) is a 1948 play by French dramatist Jean Anouilh. According to Anouilh's biographer Edward Owen Marsh, "In this angry, pessimistic work Anouilh shows himself a master at the height of his powers in every aspect of his craft... Ardèle is a terribly bitter play, but it holds the imagination as a piece of poetic theatre."

It was the first of his self-styled pièces grinçantes – i.e., 'grating' black comedies, to be followed by La Valse des toréadors (1951), Ornifle ou le Courant d'air [fr] (1955), and Pauvre Bitos ou le Dîner de têtes [fr] (1956).

== Plot ==
Set in 1912 "or thereabouts", the play concerns a family conference convened by the ageing General Léon Saint-Pé to discuss a romance entered into by his hunchbacked sister Ardèle. His other sister Liliane, a Countess, is accompanied by her husband Gaston (the Count) and her lover, Hector de Villardieu. All of them, especially the Countess, are scandalised by Ardèle's supposedly inappropriate passion for a fellow hunchback who has been engaged as tutor to the General's small son, Toto.

Their self-interested entreaties to her are communicated through her bedroom door, behind which she has locked herself and embarked on a three-day hunger-strike. The action culminates with the General's insane and apparently bed-ridden wife, Amélie, erupting from her room at dead of night while Ardèle and her lover (neither of whom is ever properly seen) take drastic action.

Other characters include Nathalie, the General's daughter in law; Nicolas, his middle son; Marie-Christine, the Countess' ten-year-old daughter, and Ada, the General's maid/mistress.

== French productions ==
Ardèle was first presented in Paris at the Comédie des Champs-Élysées on 4 November 1948; directed by Roland Piétri and designed by Jean-Denis Malclès [fr], it starred Marcel Pérès as the General, Mary Morgan [fr] as the Countess and Jacques Castelot as the Count.

Because it was a relatively short play by Anouilh's standards, the premiere was staged with a brief 'curtain-raiser' in the form of Anouilh's semi-autobiographical vignette Episode de la vie d'un auteur. Anouilh later developed the characters of the General and his wife in La Valse des toréadors (The Waltz of the Toreadors), which opened at the Comédie des Champs-Elysées in January 1952.

Paris revivals of Ardèle itself followed in 1958 at the Comédie des Champs-Élysées, 1979 at the Théâtre Hébertot (where Pierre Mondy co-directed with Piétri), and later in 1998.

A French television adaptation starring Daniel Ivernel was broadcast in October 1981.

== Cry of the Peacock ==
On Broadway, the play failed utterly in a production at the Mansfield Theatre directed by Martin Ritt, with set and costumes designed by Cecil Beaton; translator Cecil Robson changed the title to Cry of the Peacock in reference to Amélie's repeated, bird-like cries of "Léon!" Opening on 11 April 1950, it closed on the 12th. The cast included Raymond Lovell as the General with Oscar Karlweis and Marta Linden as the Count and Countess.

== British productions ==
In a version by Lucienne Hill (her first of numerous Anouilh translations), Ardèle opened at the Birmingham Repertory Theatre on 24 October 1950, with Anouilh's continuous action split up, for British audiences, into three acts. "As a piece of theatre," commented the Birmingham Post, "Ardèle takes the stage with the insistent assurance of high tragedy." The cast on this occasion included Robert Webber (not the American actor of the same name) as the General, Hazel Hughes as the Countess, Eric Porter as the Count, Paul Daneman as Nicolas, and Lucienne Hill herself as Amélie (Anglicised as Emily). The director was Douglas Seale.

Hailed in the News Chronicle as "this brilliant and terrifying play," it reached the West End on 30 August 1951 in a production at the Vaudeville Theatre directed by Anthony Pelissier. Among the cast were George Relph (the General), Isabel Jeans (the Countess), Ronald Squire (the Count) and Nicholas Phipps (Villardieu); Ronald Howard and Veronica Hurst played Nicolas and Nathalie, with the Nicolas role taken over mid-run by Patrick Macnee. The play closed in the first week of November.

In the New Statesman, T C Worsley, in a piece entitled 'The Love of the Hunchbacks', noted that "Ardèle comes very agreeably to the palate." Referring to the savagery of the play, he suggested "that it is arguable that Anouilh's device of the hunchbacks really doesn't quite hold his theme: he doesn't seem to have allowed enough for the pity that may redeem the horror." Other London critics were horrified by the play. In summarising their responses, Edward Owen Marsh included such quotes as "a slimy, decadent, demoralised and singularly repulsive exhibit," "the ugliest and most nauseating play I have ever seen," "an evening which is one long wallow of unedifying lechery," "with all the aid of Anouilh's masterly but evilly misdirected sense of theatre, sentiment is turned to gruesome obscenity" and "as distasteful and offensive a play as ever saw a stage."

In his 1953 book The French Theatre of To-day, Harold Hobson noted that "Such speeches as the mad old Générale's in the last act of Ardèle, in which her crazed and morbidly acute ears hear everywhere around her the sound of animals and people and even flowers coupling, are apt to make English audiences uncomfortable." "I remember," he added, "the horror that John Gielgud expressed to me over the scene in which the apparently pure young Nathalie confessed to Nicolas her powerlessness to resist the impulses of the flesh; and over many a luncheon Henry Sherek has described as revolting the ending of the play, where two children are made to ape the sexual desires of their parents."

=== London revival ===
Directly after a preview week at the Theatre Royal Brighton, a short-lived West End revival opened at the Queen's Theatre on 18 June 1975. It starred Charles Gray as the General, Vincent Price and Coral Browne as the Count and Countess, and Allan Cuthbertson as Villardieu; the cast also included Lalla Ward and Anita Dobson, as Nathalie and Ada respectively. "The director, Frith Banbury, has sugared the pill under layers of candy floss," noted Helen Dawson in Plays and Players magazine, "and just about smothered it." According to a programme note, "Lucienne Hill, who has translated a large number of Anouilh's plays into English, feels that foreign plays benefit from being translated every ten years or so as language and fashion changes. As a result Miss Hill has revised her original translation of Ardèle for this production."

== Casting ==
Casts for the productions of Ardèle mentioned in this article are listed below.

Character	Champs-Élysées	Champs-Élysées	Théâtre Hébertot	Broadway	Birmingham	West End	West End Revival
Character	1948	1958	1979	1950	1950	1951	1975
The General	Marcel Pérès	Roland Piétri	Daniel Ivernel	Raymond Lovell	Robert Webber (Note: Credited as General St Pé)	George Relph	Charles Gray
The Count	Jacques Castelot	Jean Martinelli	Jean-Pierre Darras	Oscar Karlweis	Eric Porter	Ronald Squire	Vincent Price
Villardieu	Claude Sainval [fr]	Claude Sainval [fr]	Gabriel Cattand	Philip Tonge	Peter Burton	Nicholas Phipps	Allan Cuthbertson
Toto	Jean-Paul Roussillon	Paul Bisciglia	Jean-Loup Horwitz [fr]	Clifford Sales	Jimmy Holland	Lance Secretan	Arthur Campbell / Matthew Ryan
Nicolas	Michel Herbault	Jean Lagache [fr]	Frédéric Delavigne	Peter Brandon	Paul Daneman	Patrick Macnee	Robin Halstead
The Countess	Mary Morgan [fr]	Monique Mélinand	Judith Magre	Marta Linden	Hazel Hughes	Isabel Jeans	Coral Browne
Nathalie	Andrée Clément	Catherine Anouilh [fr]	Martine Chevallier	Patricia Wheel	Christine Finn	Veronica Hurst	Lalla Ward
Marie-Christine	Nadia Barentin	Laurence Vigier	Michèle Lituac [fr]	Mimi Strongin	Patricia Fryer	Angela Foulds	Julia Bardsley / Emma Freud
The General's Wife	Héléna Manson	Héléna Manson	Madeleine Barbulée	Lili Darvas	Lucienne Hill (Note: Credited as Emily)	Jane Henderson (Note: Credited as Emily)	Valerie White, replaced by Elizabeth Tyrrell (Note: Credited as Emilie)
Ada	Suzanne Bernard	Marie-Claire Chantraine	Virginie Vignon [fr]	Kathleen Maguire	Joan Blake	Fanny Carby	Anita Dobson
The Hunchback			Jacques Marchand [fr]	Richard Martin (Note: Credit as Tutor)		John Burch	
