= Lucienne Hill =

French-English translator and actress

Lucienne Marie Hill (née Palmer) (30 January 1923 – 29 December 2012) was a French-English translator and actor.

She was born in Kilburn, London to an English father and a French mother. She studied modern languages at Somerville College, Oxford, and during World War II, worked at the intelligence establishment at Bletchley Park. Her acting career started after the war, and she understudied for Mae West and Siobhán McKenna in the West End. In 1952, she played Madame Lucienne in It Started in Paradise.

She is best known for her translations of the works of the French playwright Jean Anouilh, which she began at the urging of Laurence Olivier. Her first adaptation was Ardèle ou la Marguerite in 1951, and she went on to do more than 30 adaptations of Anouilh's work. She was nominated for a Tony Award for her adaptation of The Waltz of the Toreadors, in 1957. Her translation of Becket, which was premiered by the RSC in London in 1961, won multiple awards including an Evening Standard Award and a Tony Award. It was later made into a well-regarded film. She also adapted works by other French authors such as Françoise Sagan and Roger Vitrac. She remained an active writer to the end of her days.

She married three times: to film and TV director James Hill; to producer and businessman Andrew Broughton; and lastly to Robert Davies, a clothesmaker and old friend. She was predeceased by all three. She lived in Wargrave, Berkshire.
