= Léocadia =

1940 play by Jean Anouilh

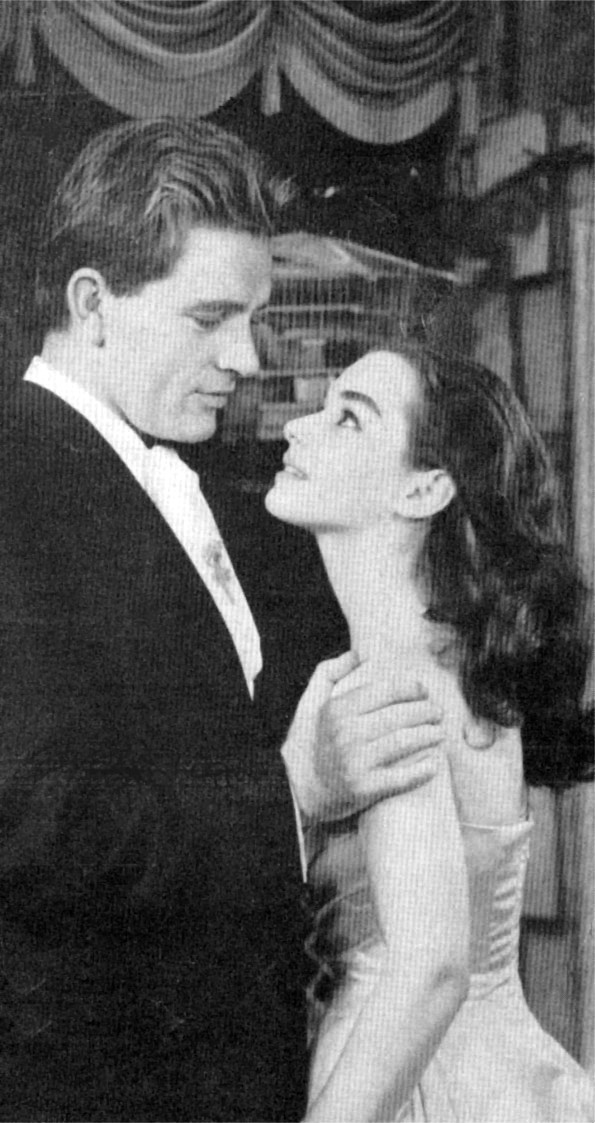
- Richard Burton and Susan Strasberg in the 1957 Broadway production Time Remembered
- Original language: French
- Written by: Jean Anouilh
- Characters: Amanda; The Prince; The Duchess; The Butler; others

Premiere
- Date: 2 December 1940
- Place: Théâtre de la Michodière, Paris

Léocadia (Time Remembered) is a play by Jean Anouilh that premiered at the Théâtre de la Michodière in Paris on 2 December 1940. It is one of Anouilh's Pièces roses, together with Humulus le muet (1932), Le Bal des voleurs (1938), and Le Rendez-vous de Senlis (1941). For the occasion, Francis Poulenc composed one of his most celebrated songs, "Les Chemins de l'amour", sung by Yvonne Printemps.

== Plot ==
Léocadia tells the story of a young prince madly in love with a Romanian opera singer, Léocadia Gardi. The young man only knew her for three days: like Isadora Duncan, she died strangled by her shawl. Inconsolable, he lives in his memory of the young woman.

His aunt—the Duchesse d'Andinet d'Andaine—reconstructs the setting and places of those three days like a theater director. Actors play the parts of the butler and servants during those days of happiness. Amanda, a poor milliner and look-alike of the singer, is called upon to seduce the prince, in the hope that life will prevail over memory.

At first, the young man clings desperately to his dream, but eventually comes to realize through Amanda that his memory of Léocadia corresponds to his fear of life being so ephemeral. His anguish at leaving an illusory memory yields soon to the call of real life. The rigid, theatrical world imagined by the duchess falls apart, becoming a false comedy. The prince leaves his illusions and discovers that Léocadia was only an ideal, devoid of substance. His love of Amanda helps him return to real life.

== Premiere cast ==
- Yvonne Printemps: Amanda
- Pierre Fresnay: The Prince
- Marguerite Deval: The Duchess
- Victor Boucher: The Butler
- in minor roles: Paul Demange, Léon Larive, Mercédès Brare, Henri-Richard, Jacques Januar and Henry Gaultier
- Director: André Barsacq
- Music: Francis Poulenc
- Premiere: 2 December 1940
- Closed after 173 performances on 27 April 1941

== Translation and adaptation ==
Patricia Moyes translated the play to English, using the title Time Remembered. It was staged both in London and on Broadway in 1957, with Richard Burton and Helen Hayes in the leading parts. In 2000, Jeffrey Hatcher wrote an adaptation of the play in English, calling it To Fool the Eye.

== Reprise ==
Comédie des Champs-Élysées in 1984

- Sabine Haudepin: Amanda
- Lambert Wilson: The Prince
- Edwige Feuillère: The Duchess
- Philippe Khorsand: The Butler
- in minor roles: Jacques Marchand, Jacques Plee, Robert Deslandes, Jacques Castelot, Francis Rossello and Philippe Dehesdin
- Director: Pierre Boutron
- Stage design: Agostino Pace
- Costumes: Yvonne Sassinot de Nesle
- Lighting: Boutron
- Music: Poulenc
- First performance on 11 September 1984
