= Eurydice (Anouilh play) =

Play by Jean Anouilh

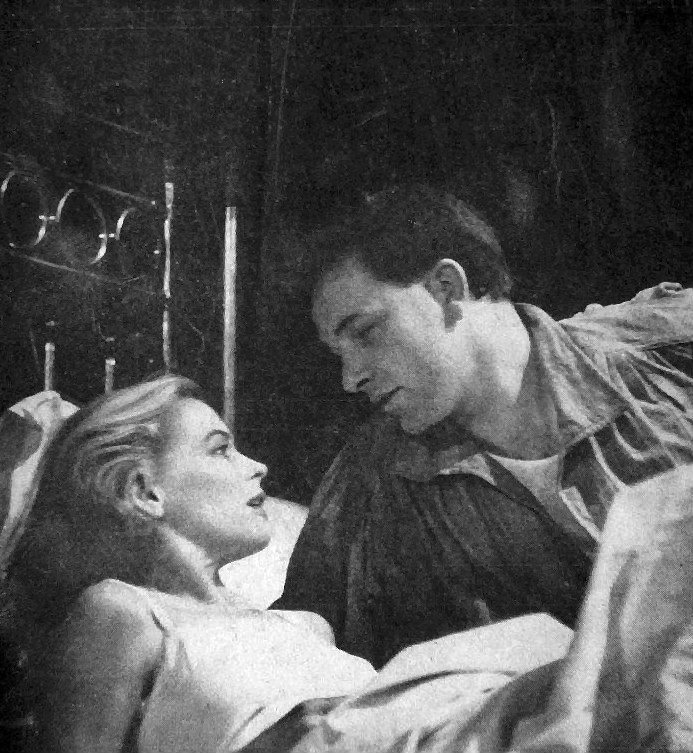
Dorothy McGuire and Richard Burton in the 1951 Broadway production Legend of Lovers

Eurydice is a play by French writer Jean Anouilh, written in 1941. The story is set in the 1930s, among a troupe of travelling performers. It combines skepticism about romance in general and the intensity of the relationship between Orpheus and Eurydice with an other-worldly mysticism. The result is a heavily ironic modern retelling of the classical Orpheus myth. The play has also been performed under the title Point of Departure, a translation by Kitty Black, and on Broadway as Legend of Lovers, in a 1951 production by the Theatre Guild.

== Synopsis ==
Eurydice is the daughter of the leading actress in a second-rate acting troupe. The troupe is waiting in a train station. Orphée is a violinist at the station restaurant. Eurydice and Orphée meet and fall in love instantly. Eurydice rejects the advances of a young man named Matthew—who is her lover and a fellow member of the troupe. Orphée is repulsed at the thought of Matthew having touched his love, but Eurydice reassures him that he and one other man who took her virginity are her only two previous lovers. Orphée notes that he can tell when Eurydice is lying because of the color of her eyes changes accordingly. Offstage, Matthew throws himself under a train in despair of Eurydice's rejection, and humbled by this news, the couple runs away together. They are followed by both M. Henri, a mysterious figure, and Dulac, the manager of the acting troupe. In a hotel room the next day, Eurydice and Orphée discuss the identity as something grounded in the past or in the present. Eurydice becomes uncomfortable with Orphée's insistence that the past matters a great amount. While Orphée is out of the room, Eurydice is visited by a hotel worker and given a mysterious letter. She reads it and leaves the hotel room when Orphée returns, claiming that she needs to run errands. After she exits, Dulac enters the room and reveals to Orphée that Eurydice is his mistress, too. Orphée does not believe him, but before he can confirm the truth with Eurydice, the two men receive word that she has died in a bus crash—and that the bus was not going to the market, but on its way out of town.

M. Henri, the mysterious man, is moved to compassion for Orphée and makes a bargain with him: If Orphée wants his beloved back, it is possible; he simply has to wait at the train station beside her spirit until sunrise—but he cannot look into her eyes or she will die a second death. Eurydice is brought back to life. As they sit and wait, Orphée brings up the subject of Dulac. Eurydice insists that she never slept with him, but Orphée cannot know for sure without looking into her eyes. Driven crazy with uncertainty, he does so and she admits that she was in fact Dulac's lover. However, Dulac had blackmailed her into doing it every time, threatening to fire a young, orphaned stage manager working in the troupe. The police officer who found Eurydice's body enters, reading a letter that she wrote in the taxi to Orphée. It reveals that she planned to leave town because she was so in love with Orphée, and knew that her promiscuous past was something he could never overcome—despite the fact that her love for him had made her pure again. She dies once more, leaving Orphée miserable and alone with his mess of a father. Distraught, he talks with M. Henri, who convinces him that the perfect relationship he envisioned having with Eurydice is still possible...but only in death. In fact, if she hadn't died, M. Henri says, the relationship would have eventually disappointed him. Reassured that he will be with his true love in death, Orphée kills himself offstage. As ghosts, the couple reunites on stage, happy and in love forever more.

== Radio ==
BBC THIRD PROGRAMME, 5/2/51. Cast included Paul Scofield, Esme Percy and Sebastian Cabot. Held at The British Library National Sound Archive, Find Format: T11629WR C1

== Film ==
- Point of Departure (1966) Australian TV play
- You Ain't Seen Nothin' Yet by Alain Resnais (2012)
