= The Waltz of the Toreadors =

The Waltz of the Toreadors (La Valse des toréadors) is a 1951 play by Jean Anouilh.

== Plot ==
This bitter farce is set in 1910 France and focuses on General Léon Saint-Pé and his infatuation with Ghislaine, a woman with whom he danced at a garrison ball some 17 years earlier. Because of the General's commitment to his marriage, the couple's love remained unconsummated. Now faced by the reality of retirement with his hypochondriac wife, the General finds himself lost in fond memories of his old flirtation. When Ghislaine suddenly reappears, he is delighted — until he finds himself competing for her hand with a considerably younger suitor.

== Background ==
The General and his mad wife had previously appeared in Anouilh's 1948 play Ardèle ou la Marguerite, and a further variant on the character appeared in the 1958 comedy L'Hurluberlu, ou le Réactionnaire amoureux. By the time of Anouilh's last play, Le Nombril (1981), Léon St Pé had transformed into a grouchy and unfashionable old playwright intended by Anouilh as a cynical self-portrait.

== Stage productions ==
The Waltz of the Toreadors premiered in Paris at the Comédie des Champs-Elysées on 8 January 1952, with Claude Sainval and Marie Ventura in the leading roles. Four years later, it premiered in London in an English translation by Lucienne Hill. Directed by Peter Hall, the production opened at the Arts Theatre on 24 February 1956, then transferred to the larger Criterion Theatre on 27 March, running in all for 700 performances. The cast included Welsh character actor Hugh Griffith as the General and Beatrix Lehmann as Mme St Pé, with Brenda Bruce as Ghislaine and Trader Faulkner as Gaston. For part of the Criterion run, Renée Asherson took over as Ghislaine.

"This is an extraordinary work," claimed T C Worsley in the New Statesman. "It is at the same time wildly comic and savagely cruel; it moves with a virtuoso's freedom up and down the emotional scale from pure farce at one extreme to real pathos at the other. There are scenes of pure horror and there are scenes of pure comedy, and M Anouilh modulates between them with an absolutely sure touch." According to the News Chronicle, "the play, though deplorable, is a bit of a masterpiece." "This farce," added The Times, "has a bitter, some will say sour, flavour, but even those who resent its hard realism will be highly amused in spite of themselves, for a resourceful wit is supported by a brilliant sense of the theatre."

A Broadway production, directed by Harold Clurman, opened on 17 January 1957 at the Coronet Theatre, where it ran for 132 performances. The cast included Ralph Richardson as the General, his real-life wife Meriel Forbes as Ghislaine, Mildred Natwick as Mme St Pé, and Louise Kirtland as Mme DuPont-Fredaine. The production received Tony Award nominations for Best Play, Best Direction, Best Actor in a Play (Richardson), Best Featured Actress in a Play (Natwick), and Best Scenic Design (Ben Edwards). It won the New York Drama Critics' Circle Award for Best Foreign Play. Brooks Atkinson in the New York Times pronounced it "startling and funny ... original, bright, tart and worldly." Other US estimates included "endlessly fascinating and uproariously funny" (New York Herald Tribune), "a genuinely uproarious sex comedy, witty, ironic, sophisticated" (New York Post) and "exhilarating entertainment" (The New Yorker).

On 4 March 1958 the play returned to the Coronet, where it ran for 31 performances. Again directed by Clurman, it starred Melvyn Douglas as the General, Betty Field as Ghislaine, and Lili Darvas as Mme St Pé.

The second Broadway revival, directed by Brian Murray, opened on 13 September 1973 at the Circle in the Square Theatre, where it ran for 85 performances. The cast included Eli Wallach as the General, Diana van der Vlis as Ghislaine, and Anne Jackson (Wallach's real-life wife) as Mme St Pé. This was the first of several revivals around this time. In October 1973, Louis de Funès starred in a new production at the Comédie des Champs-Elysées (with Luce Garcia Ville as his wife and Mony Dalmés as Ghislaine); this production was directed by Anouilh himself in conjunction with Roland Piétri (who also played the Curé). Then in 1974 Trevor Howard starred opposite Coral Browne (Mme St Pé), Zena Walker (Ghislaine) and Ian Ogilvy (Gaston) in a revival at London's Theatre Royal Haymarket.

Among more recent revivals of the play, Peter Bowles starred in a 2007 production at the Chichester Festival Theatre; the new translation was by Ranjit Bolt.

== Adaptations ==
A television production aired on 16 November 1959 as part of David Susskind's anthology series Play of the Week. It was directed by Stuart Burge, and starred Hugh Griffith as the General and Mildred Natwick as Mme St Pé, reprising their roles from the West End and Broadway productions respectively, as well as Beatrice Straight as Ghislaine.

A 1962 feature film, Waltz of the Toreadors, directed by John Guillermin, transported the setting to England and anglicised the lead characters' names to General Leo and Emily Fitzjohn. The cast included Peter Sellers as the General, Dany Robin as Ghislaine (who remained French), and Margaret Leighton as Mrs Fitzjohn. Wolf Mankowitz was nominated for a BAFTA for Best British Screenplay and Sellers was awarded the Silver Shell for Best Actor at the San Sebastián International Film Festival.

The play was adapted by Howard Marren and Joe Masteroff as the 1998 musical Paramour. It had its premiere in 1998 at the Old Globe Theatre in San Diego in a production directed by Joseph Hardy and starring Len Cariou.

== Awards and nominations ==
=== Original Broadway production ===
Year	Award	Category	Nominee	Result
1957	Tony Award	Best Play		Nominated
1957	Tony Award	Best Actor in a Play	Ralph Richardson	Nominated
1957	Tony Award	Best Featured Actress in a Play	Mildred Natwick	Nominated
1957	Tony Award	Best Scenic Design	Ben Edwards	Nominated
1957	Tony Award	Best Director	Harold Clurman	Nominated
