= Becket =

Theater play by Jean Anouilh

- Original title: Becket ou l'honneur de Dieu (literally "Becket, or the honour of god")
- Original language: French
- Written by: Jean Anouilh
- Characters: Thomas Becket; King Henry II; King Louis VII; Cardinal Zambelli; Pope Alexander III; Bishop Folliot; Brother John; Empress Matilda; Eleanor of Aquitaine; Prince Henry; Prince John
- Subject: Becket controversy
- Genre: Historical drama
- Setting: 12th-century Europe

Premiere
- Date: 8 October 1959
- Place: Theatre Montparnasse

Becket or The Honour of God (French: Becket ou l'honneur de Dieu), often shortened to Becket, is a 1959 stage play written in French by Jean Anouilh. It is a depiction of the conflict between Thomas Becket and King Henry II of England leading to Becket's assassination in 1170. It contains many historical inaccuracies, which the author acknowledged.

== Background ==
Anouilh's interpretation of the historical story, though often ironic, is more straightforward than T. S. Eliot's 1935 play on the same subject, Murder in the Cathedral, which was intended primarily as a religious treatment. However, there are one or two similarities in the interpretation.

In the introduction to the play, Anouilh explained that he based it on a chapter of an old book he had bought because its green binding looked good on his shelves. He and his wife read the 30 pages about Thomas Becket, and she urged him to write a play about Thomas. He did so, finishing the first part in only 15 days. Not until he showed the finished play to a friend did he discover that the old book on which he had based it was historically incorrect in certain important aspects. Having built his play on Becket being Saxon (when he was actually a Norman whose family was from near Caen and was called Becquet, Bequet or Becket in Old Norman), Anouilh could not recast the play to accord with historical facts, so he decided to let it stand.

Aspects of the content that can safely be considered true are the conflicts between England and France, church and state, and the outline biography of Becket.

== Synopsis ==
The play is a re-enactment of the conflicts between King Henry II and Thomas Becket, which take place as the latter (Henry's best friend) ascends to power. Becket begins as a clever, but hedonistic, companion; as a result of being created Archbishop of Canterbury, he is transformed into an ascetic who does his best to preserve the rights of the church against the king's power.

Ultimately, Becket is slaughtered by several of the king's nobles; and lastly we find the king thrust into penance for the episcopicide.

== Stage productions ==
The play was first performed in the original French at the Théâtre Montparnasse-Gaston Baty in Paris on 8 October 1959, and in an English translation on Broadway in 1960. The original Parisian production was directed by Roland Piétri, and starred Bruno Cremer as Thomas Becket and Daniel Ivernel as King Henry II.

=== Broadway ===
The first Broadway production premiered on 5 October 1960 at the St. James Theatre. It was produced by David Merrick and directed by Peter Glenville, and starred Laurence Olivier as Thomas Becket and Anthony Quinn as King Henry II. The production was nominated for five Tony Awards and won four, including Best Play. The play later transferred to the Royale Theatre and then to the Hudson Theatre. It was wrongly believed that during the run Quinn and Olivier switched roles, with Quinn playing Becket to Olivier's King. In fact, Quinn left the production to work on a film, and director Glenville suggested a road tour with Olivier as Henry. Olivier happily acceded, and Arthur Kennedy took on the role of Becket, with Olivier playing Henry, both for the tour and a brief return to Broadway.

However, according to John Cottrell's biography of Laurence Olivier, Anthony Quinn was dismayed and angry when he read that Olivier was getting better reviews for his performance as Henry than Quinn had got, claiming that he would never have left the production if he had known that was going to happen. (After Olivier's death, Quinn displayed extreme animosity towards the actor in his second autobiography.) Even so, Quinn was nominated for a Tony Award for his performance, while Olivier was overlooked.

=== London productions ===
The first London production was at the Aldwych Theatre on 11 July 1961, directed by Peter Hall for the Royal Shakespeare Company. Eric Porter played Becket and Christopher Plummer the King, with Gwen Ffrangcon-Davies, Peter Jeffrey, Diana Rigg, Ian Holm and Roy Dotrice in the cast. The play later transferred to the Globe Theatre. Plummer won the Evening Standard Award for his performance after taking over the part from Peter O'Toole, who broke his contract with the RSC before rehearsals began, in order to take the lead role in David Lean's film Lawrence of Arabia.

The play was revived in a new translation by Frederic Raphael and Stephen Raphael in October 1991 at the Haymarket Theatre with Derek Jacobi as Becket and Robert Lindsay as the King and again in October 2004 with Dougray Scott and Jasper Britton. The original English translation for the 1961 version (by Lucienne Hill) was revived at the Southwark Playhouse in September 2001 with Rupert Degas and Colin Salmon.

=== Edinburgh ===
In 1964, the play was staged by the Edinburgh Gateway Company, directed by Victor Carin.

== Film adaptation ==
In 1964 the play was made into a successful film, starring Peter O'Toole and Richard Burton, with John Gielgud, Donald Wolfit and Martita Hunt. Additional scenes were written by Edward Anhalt for the film. Anhalt won an Academy Award for his screenplay.

The film introduced a somewhat fictionalized plot element not in the original play. Rather than the main conflict between Becket and the King revolving around the Constitutions of Clarendon – as is depicted in the play and as happened in historical fact – the film's dispute between Becket and Henry II centers on the assassination of an accused priest by the henchmen of Lord Gilbert, a nobleman and friend of King Henry, and Becket's excommunication of Gilbert as a result.

At the beginning of the movie's DVD commentary, Peter O'Toole relates his meeting with Anouilh in Paris a few years before the film was made because he was being considered for the play. Anouilh told him that he had been looking for an idea based on a rift in the leftist Théâtre National Populaire between the actors Gérard Philipe and Daniel Ivernel. He visited Canterbury and decided the Becket story would be a good vehicle. Philipe and Ivernel were cast as Becket and Henry respectively for the Paris premiere of the play, but Philipe died before rehearsals were completed.

== Radio adaptation ==
Ukemi Productions adapted the work for BBC Radio 3. The production starred Toby Stephens as the King and David Morrissey as Becket, and was broadcast on 4 October 2009.

== Awards and nominations ==
=== Original Broadway production ===
| Year | Award | Category | Nominee | Result |
|---|---|---|---|---|
| 1961 | Tony Award | Best Play | | Won |
| 1961 | Tony Award | Best Actor in a Play | Anthony Quinn | Nominated |
| 1961 | Tony Award | Best Scenic Design in a Play | Oliver Smith | Won |
| 1961 | Tony Award | Best Costume Design in a Play | Motley | Won |
| 1961 | Tony Award | Best Stage Technician | Teddy Van Bemmel | Won |
