= Dear Antoine: or, the Love That Failed =

Cher Antoine ou l'Amour raté
- Written by: Jean Anouilh
- Original language: French
- Setting: Bavaria

Premiere
- Date premiered: October 1, 1969
- Place premiered: Théâtre des Champs-Élysées

Cher Antoine ou l'Amour raté is a play in four acts by French dramatist Jean Anouilh. It was written and first produced in Paris on October 1, 1969 in a production that was co-directed by the author.

== Synopsis ==
The play takes place in Bavaria in 1913. Antoine was a famous playwright and director, who died in his castle in Bavaria where he had retired. (He killed himself accidentally while cleaning his gun.) The important people in his life, including his ex-wives, all came to the castle for a reading of his last will and testament. They were all trapped by an avalanche, and had to stay in the castle until the road would be cleared. Antoine had organized this gathering in detail, and had even written a play about it.

== Original cast ==
- Jacques François: Antoine
- Claude Nicot: Cravatar
- Hubert Deschamps: Marcellin
- Pierre Bertin: hare foot
- Joseph Falcucci: Alexandre
- Francine Bergé: Estelle
- Françoise Rosay: Carlotta
- Nelly Benedetti: Valérie
- Uta Taeger: Anemone
- Madeleine Ozeray: Gabrielle
- Édith Scob: Maria
- Madeleine Suffel: Frida
- Roland Pietri: The German notary
- The actors, played by different characters
- Alexis, mute character, played by Alexander
- A small German valet, mute character
- The consul of France, invisible character

== Film adaptation ==
The 2012 film, You Ain't Seen Nothin' Yet!, directed by Alain Resnais, is a loose adaptation of Dear Antoine, or the Love that Failed. Resnais and Anouilh had worked together on a number of plays.
