= Y'avait un prisonnier =

Y'avait un prisonnier is a play by French dramatist Jean Anouilh. It consists of three acts and was first performed at the Theatre of the Ambassadors in Paris in March 1935.

== Plot ==
Ludovic is a successful businessman but an error of judgement drives him to bankruptcy. Condemned to fifteen years' imprisonment in Italy, he finds his family at Cannes aboard the luxurious yacht of his brother-in-law, Guillaume Barricault. The latter has arranged the marriage of Anne-Marie, the daughter of Adeline from a first marriage, to the young Gaston Dupont-Dufort whose family is particularly influential, in order to restore the family's respectability sullied by Ludovic's errors. However, the experience of prison has profoundly changed the latter's character.

== Original cast ==
- Aimé Clariond: Ludovic
- Marguerite Pierry: Adeline, his wife
- Simone Renant: Anne-Marie, daughter of Adeline
- Jean Mercanton: Robert, son of Ludovic and Adeline
- Henri Nassiet: Guillaume Barricault, Adeline's brother
- Leo Peltier: Gaston Dupont-Dufort
- Simone Gauthier: Lucienne
- Henri Crémieux: Mr. Peine
- Pierre Labry: The Sheep
- André Alerme: Marcellin
- Sets: René Moulaert
