= Jean Anouilh =

French playwright (1910–1987)

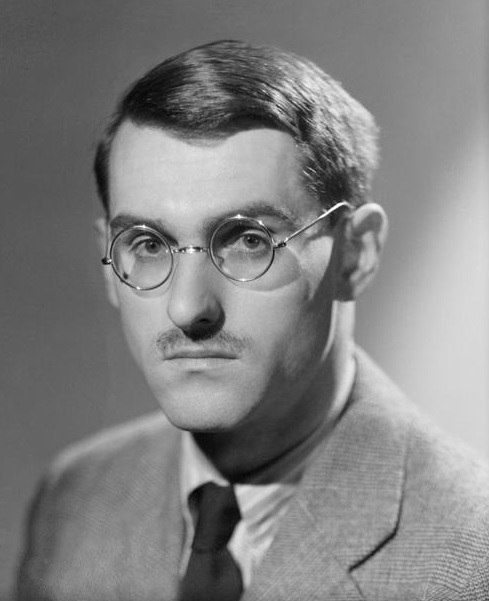
- Anouilh c. 1940
- Born: Jean Marie Lucien Pierre Anouilh; 23 June 1910; Bordeaux, France
- Died: 3 October 1987 (aged 77); Lausanne, Switzerland
- Occupations: Dramatist and screenwriter
- Spouses: Monelle Valentin (m. 1931); Nicole Lançon (m. 1953)
- Writing career
- Notable works: The Lark; Becket; Traveler without Luggage; Antigone
- Notable awards: Prix mondial Cino Del Duca
- Movement: Modernism

Jean Marie Lucien Pierre Anouilh (/ɑːˈnuːjə/; French: [ʒɑ̃ anuj]; (Note: Not, as often mispronounced, French pronunciation: [anwi].) 23 June 1910 – 3 October 1987) was a French dramatist and screenwriter whose career spanned five decades. Though his work ranged from high drama to absurdist farce, Anouilh is best known for his 1944 production of Sophocles's Antigone, which, though performed without objection by censors, was nevertheless seen as an attack on Marshal Pétain's Vichy government. His plays are less experimental than those of his contemporaries, having clearly organized plot and eloquent dialogue. One of France's most prolific writers after World War II, much of Anouilh's work deals with themes of maintaining integrity in a world of moral compromise.

== Life and career ==
=== Early life ===
Anouilh was born in Cérisole, a small village on the outskirts of Bordeaux, France, and had Basque ancestry. His father, François Anouilh, was a tailor, and Anouilh maintained that he inherited from him a pride in conscientious craftmanship. He may owe his artistic bent to his mother, Marie-Magdeleine, a violinist who supplemented the family's meager income by playing summer seasons in the casino orchestra in the nearby seaside resort of Arcachon. Marie-Magdeleine worked the night shifts in the music-hall orchestras and sometimes accompanied stage presentations, affording Anouilh ample opportunity to absorb the dramatic performances from backstage. He often attended rehearsals and solicited the resident authors to let him read scripts until bedtime. He first tried his hand at playwriting here at the age of 12, though his earliest works do not survive.

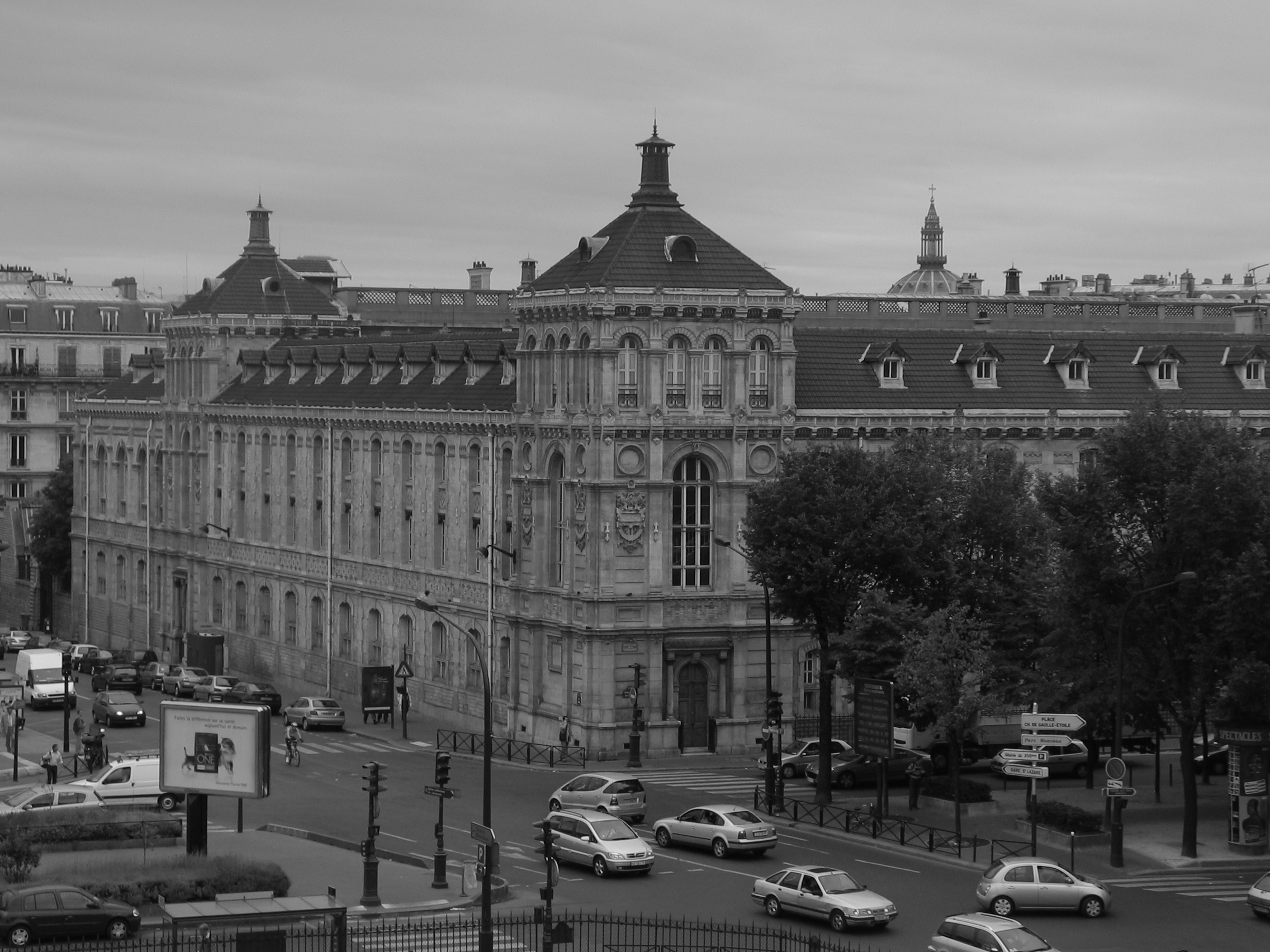
The Lycée Chaptal, at the corner of rue de Rome and the boulevard des Batignolles

In 1918 the family moved to Paris where the young Anouilh received his secondary education at the Lycée Chaptal. Jean-Louis Barrault, later a major French director, was a pupil there at the same time and recalls Anouilh as an intense, rather dandified figure who hardly noticed a boy some two years younger than himself. He earned acceptance into the law school at the Sorbonne, but, unable to support himself financially, he left after just 18 months to seek work as a copywriter at the advertising agency Publicité Damour. He liked the work and spoke more than once with wry approval of the lessons in the classical virtues of brevity and precision of language he learned while he drafted advertising copy.

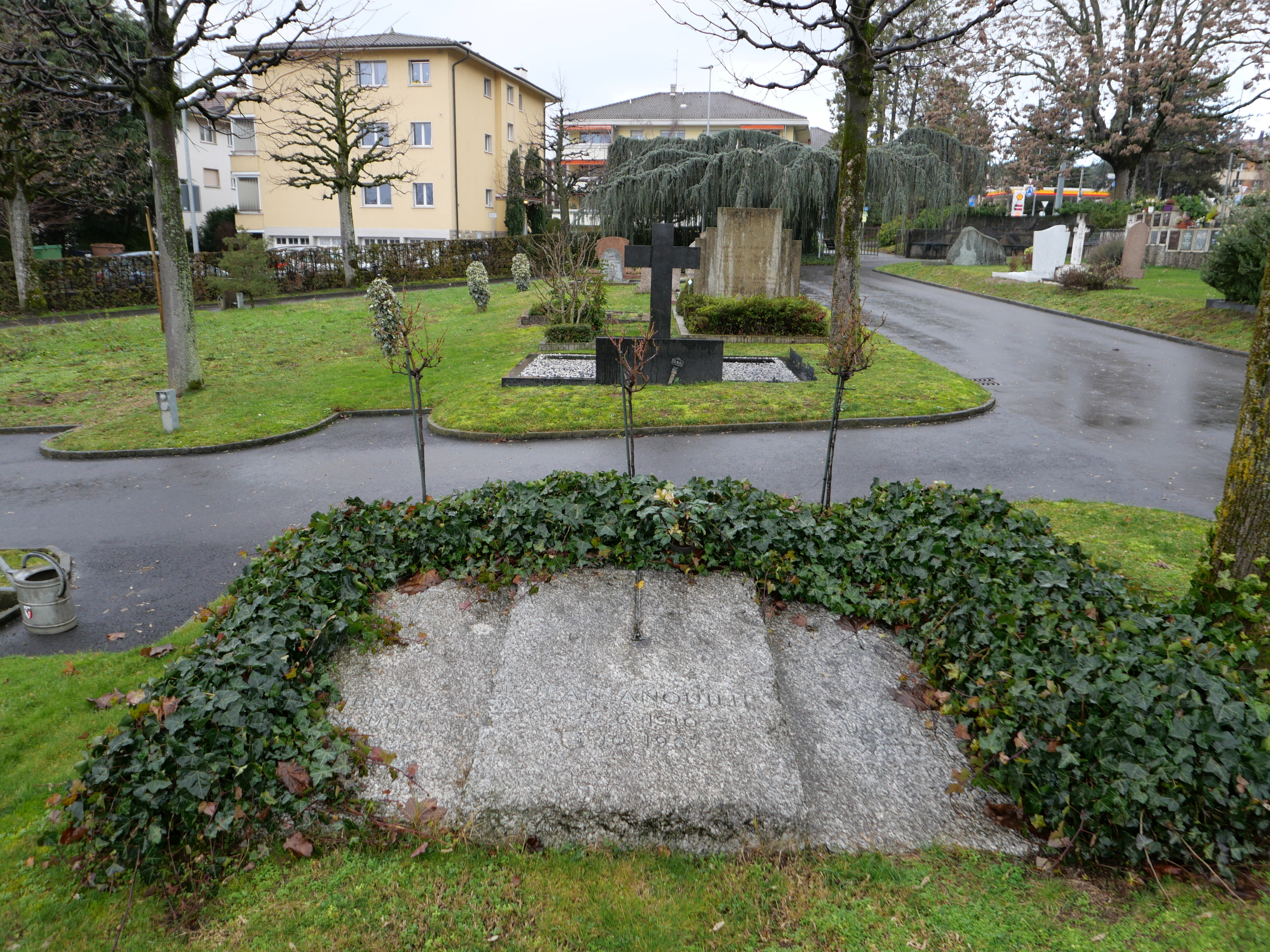
The grave of Anouilh, his eldest daughter Catherine (1934–1989) and his last partner Ursula Wetzel (1938–2010) at the cemetery of Pully near Lausanne

Anouilh's financial troubles continued after he was called up to military service in 1929. Supported by only his meager conscription salary, Anouilh married the actress Monelle Valentin in 1931. Though Valentin starred in many of his plays, Anouilh's daughter Caroline (from his second marriage), says the marriage was not a happy one. Anouilh's youngest daughter Colombe even says there was never an official marriage between Anouilh and Valentin. She allegedly had multiple extramarital affairs, which caused Anouilh much pain and suffering. The infidelity weighed heavily on the dramatist as a result of the uncertainty about his own parentage. According to Caroline, Anouilh had learned that his mother had had a lover at the theatre in Arcachon who was actually his biological father. In spite of this, Anouilh and Valentin had a daughter, Catherine, in 1934 who followed the pair into theatre work at an early age. Anouilh's growing family placed further strain on his already limited finances. Determined to break into writing full time, he began to write comic scenes for the cinema to supplement their income.

== Theatre work ==
At the age of 25 Anouilh found work as a secretary to the French actor and director Louis Jouvet at the Comédie des Champs-Elysées. Though Anouilh's boss had happily lent him some of the set furniture left over from the production of Jean Giraudoux's play Siegfried to furnish his modest home, the director was not interested in encouraging his assistant's attempts at playwriting. Jouvet had risen to fame in the early 1930s through his collaborations with the playwright Giraudoux, and together the two worked to shift focus from the authorial voice of the director (which had dominated the French stage since the early twentieth century) back to the playwright and his text.

Giraudoux was an inspiration to Anouilh, and with the encouragement of the acclaimed playwright he began writing again in 1929. Before the end of the year he made his theatrical debut with Humulus le muet, a collaborative project with Jean Aurenche. It was followed by his first solo projects, L'Hermine (The Ermine) in 1932 and Mandarine in 1933, both produced by Aurélien Lugné-Poe, an innovative actor and stage manager who was then head of the Théâtre de l'Œuvre. Ruled by the philosophy, "the word creates the decor," Lugné-Poe let Anouilh's lyrical prose shine in front of a backdrop of simple compositions of line and color that created a unity of style and mood.

The plays were not great successes, closing after 37 and 13 performances, respectively, but Anouilh persevered, following up with a string of productions, most notably Y'avait un prisonnier (1935). These works, most in collaboration with the experimental Russian director Georges Pitoëff, were considered promising despite their lack of commercial profits, and the duo continued to work together until they had their first major success in 1937 with Le voyageur sans bagage (Traveller Without Luggage). In subsequent years there was rarely a season in Paris that did not prominently feature a new Anouilh play, and many of these were also being exported to England and America. After 1938, however, much of Anouilh's later work was directed by the prominent Paris scenic designer André Barsacq, who had taken over as director of the Théâtre de l'Atelier after Charles Dullin's retirement in 1940. Barsacq was a champion for Anouilh, and their affiliation was a major factor in the playwright's continued success after the war.

== Playwright ==
In the 1940s, Anouilh turned from contemporary tales to more mythical, classic, and historic subjects. With protagonists who asserted their independence from the fated past, themes during this period are more closely related to the existential concerns of such writers as Jean-Paul Sartre and Albert Camus. The most famous play of this group is Antigone, which "established Anouilh as a leading dramatist, not only because of the power with which he drew the classic confrontation between the uncompromising Antigone and the politically expedient Creon, but also because French theatre-goers under the occupation read the play as a contemporary political parable." His post-war plays dealt with similar concerns and included Roméo et Jeannette, Médée (Medea), and Anouilh's Joan of Arc story L'Alouette (The Lark), which, in its distinct optimism, rivalled the commercial success of Antigone.

Anouilh himself grouped his plays of this period on the basis of their dominant tone, publishing his later works in collected volumes to reflect what he felt "represented the phases of his evolution and loosely resembled the distinction between comedy and tragedy." Pièces noires or "Black plays" were tragedies or realistic dramas and included Antigone, Jézabel, and La Sauvage (The Restless Heart). This category typically featured "young, idealistic, and uncompromising protagonists [who] are able to maintain their integrity only by choosing death." By contrast, Anouilh's pièces roses or "pink plays" were comedies where fantasy dominated with an atmosphere similar to that of fairy tales. In these plays such as Le Bal des voleurs (Carnival of Thieves), Le Rendez-vous de Senlis (Dinner with the Family) and Léocadia (Time Remembered), the focus is on "the burden of the environment and especially of the past on a protagonist seeking a happier, freer existence."

Most of Anouilh's plays of the late 1940s and into the 1950s become darker and distinctly cruel and, in contrast with his earlier works, begin to feature middle-aged characters who must view life more practically than Anouilh's former idealistic youths. The playwright divided the works of this period into pièces brillantes ("brilliant plays") and pièces grinçantes ("grating plays"). The first group includes works such as L'Invitation au château (Ring Round the Moon) and Colombe, and are typified by aristocratic settings and witty banter. The grating plays like La Valse des toréadors (Waltz of the Toreadors) and Le Réactionnaire amoureux (The Fighting Cock) are more bitterly funny, trading clever word play for a darker tone of disillusionment.

Another category Anouilh specifies are his pièces costumées ("costume plays") which include The Lark, La Foire d'Empoigne (Catch as Catch Can), and Becket, an international success, depicting the historical martyr Thomas Becket, the Archbishop of Canterbury who sought to defend the church against the monarch (and his friend), Henry II of England, who had appointed him to his see. So classified because they share historical "costumed" settings, Anouilh also specifies that these plays must also prominently feature an enlightened protagonist seeking "a moral path in a world of corruption and manipulation."

Anouilh's final period begins with La Grotte (The Cavern), in which he comments on his own progress as a writer and a theatre artist. The central character is a playwright suffering from writer's block who in his frustration recalls the foibles of Luigi Pirandello's Six Characters in Search of an Author. Anouilh's work had always contained hints of metatheatricality, or commentary on the business of theatre within the world of the play, but in his late works these structures became more fully developed as he begins to write primarily about characters who are dramatists or theatre directors. There is also a pronounced link, during this time, of Anouilh's emphasis of theatre and the family, displaying intimate relationships that are "more profound and more important than the traditional heightened action of 'theatre'". Antoine, the playwright-protagonist of Cher Antoine; ou, L'Amour raté (Dear Antoine; or, The Love That Failed), asserts that the world must take notice of these pièces secrètes (secret dramas) and Anouilh scholars have proposed this name, pièces secrètes, to classify the collected works of his latest period."

== Political controversy ==
Anouilh remained staunchly apolitical for most of his life and career. He served in the military during at least two periods, having been drafted into the French Army in 1931 and 1939. He was a prisoner of war for a short time when the Germans conquered France and willingly lived and worked in Paris during the subsequent German occupation. Because he refused to take sides during France's collaboration with the Axis Alliance, some critics have branded him as a potential Nazi sympathiser. This controversy escalated as a result of Anouilh's public clashes with the leader of the Free French Forces (and later president of the Fifth Republic), General Charles de Gaulle. In the mid-1940s, Anouilh and several other intellectuals signed a petition for clemency to save the writer Robert Brasillach, who was condemned to death for being a Nazi collaborator. Brasillach was executed by firing squad in February 1945, despite the outcry from Anouilh and his peers that the new government had no right to persecute individuals for "intellectual crimes" in the absence of military or political action. Nevertheless, Anouilh refused to comment on his political views, writing in a letter to the Belgian critic Hubert Gignoux in 1946, "I do not have a biography and I am very happy about it. The rest of my life, as long as God wills it, will remain my personal business, and I will withhold the details of it." Anouilh's plays provide the most important clues about his political point of view, though their reputation for ambiguity further complicates the matter. For instance, Antigone provides an allegorical representation of the debate between the idealistic members of the French Resistance and the pragmatism of the collaborationists. Though many have read the play as having a strong anti-Nazi sentiment, the fact that the Vichy Regime allowed the piece to be performed without censure testifies to the fact that it was potentially seen as supportive of the occupation in its time. Though the playwright romanticizes Antigone's sense of honor and duty to what is morally right, in this case resisting the Nazi forces, it can also be said that Anouilh, like Sophocles before him, makes a convincing argument for Creon's method of leadership.

== Awards and recognition ==
In 1970 his work was recognized with the Prix mondial Cino Del Duca. In 2012, the Nobel Records were opened after 50 years and it was revealed that Anouilh was among a shortlist of authors considered for the 1962 Nobel Prize in Literature, along with John Steinbeck (winner), Robert Graves, Lawrence Durrell and Karen Blixen. According to a report in The Guardian, "It is not clear why Anouilh was passed over, but the French poet Saint-John Perse had taken the Nobel in 1960, meaning that France was well represented on the roster of winners, and Svenska Dagbladet reveals that Jean-Paul Sartre, who won the prize in 1964, was starting to be seriously considered as a candidate."

In 1980, Anouilh was the first recipient of the Grand Prix du Théâtre de l'Académie française established that year.

== Critical discussion ==
By the end of his career, Anouilh's reputation outstripped those of some of his contemporaries despite his repertoire remaining mostly confined to theatre and film. Most French dramatists of the 1930s and 1940s, including Anouilh's most significant contemporary influence, Giraudoux, not only wrote for the stage but also composed poetry, novels, or essays. Nevertheless, he remained prolific, consistently producing and publishing performance works for more than fifty years.

Anouilh's early works were "naturalistic studies of a sordid and corrupt world." Many of these plays present the reader with the striking and inescapable dichotomy between pragmatism and a sort of transcendent idealism. There is little to no "middle ground of ambiguity" that exists where this conflict asserts itself. This is evidenced in Le Voyageur Sans Bagage. The main character Gaston, a World War I veteran who suffers from amnesia, cannot remember the moral depravity of his youth (he slept with his brother's wife and severely injured his best friend). This checkered past is invariably at odds with the near-angelic behavior that he now exhibits, and recognition of this truth forces him to leave his former identity behind, unable to reconcile the two sides of himself. In denouncing his past, Gaston reclasses his freedom as an illusion, but one of his own making. He befriends a young English boy and shows him his identifying scar; this gesture allows the boy to describe Gaston to the authorities, thereby claiming him as kin. With a new life and a new family, Gaston has a fresh start. David I. Grossvogel, describes this situation as the "restoration of a childhood paradise lost," attributing Le Voyageur Sans Bagage as the beginning of Anouilh's search to justify the unhappiness of his youth. Theatre historian Marvin Carlson agrees, noting that this play epitomizes the "complex tonality and deft dramatic technique" that remained throughout his work, though, he asserts, it was only as the playwright matured that his "dark view of the human condition [reached] its final expression."

Anouilh disagreed with these somber readings of his best works, however, arguing that, like all great French literature, his plays had found ways to laugh at misfortune. "Thanks to Molière," Anouilh said, "the true French theatre is the only one that is not gloomy, in which we laugh like men at war with our misery and our horror. This humor is one of France's messages to the world."

Disclosing his thoughts on French theatre and his personal perspective as a playwright, he said that the perception of his work was often misguided:

I am played in private theaters, so I write for the bourgeoisie. One has to rely on the people who pay for their places; the people who support the theater are bourgeois. But this public has changed: They have such a terror of not being in touch, of missing out on a fashionable event that they no longer exist as a decisive force. I think the public has lost its head. They now say that a play can't be that good if they can understand it. My plays are not hermetic enough. It's rather Molièresque, don't you think?

— Jean Anouilh

In the 1950s, Anouilh examined his antagonism with General de Gaulle in L'Hurluberlu, ou Le Reactionnaire amoureux (1958) and Le Songe du critique (1960). He began to lose the favor of audiences and critics alike, however, with the emergence of such playwrights as Eugène Ionesco and Samuel Beckett. Though he shared with these authors a "similar desperate vision of human existence," these new absurdist theatres' pursuit of alternative dramaturgies made Anouilh's semi-realistic plays seem dull and old-fashioned. In the 1980s Anouilh reinvented himself as a director, staging his own plays as well as those of other authors. He died of a heart attack in Lausanne, Switzerland on 3 October 1987. By then divorced from Monelle Valentin, he was survived by his second wife, Nicole Lançon, and four children.

== Works ==
=== Original theatre productions: Paris ===
- L'Hermine. Théâtre de l'Œuvre: 26 April 1932. Directed by Paulette Pax. With Pierre Fresnay, Paulette Pax, Marie Reinhardt.
- Mandarine. Théâtre de l'Athénée: 17 January 1933. Directed by Gérard Batbedat. With Paul Lalloz, Milly Mathis, Madeleine Ozeray.
- Y'avait un prisonnier. Théâtre des Ambassadeurs: 21 March 1935. Presented by Marie Bell. With Aimé Clariond, Marguerite Pierry, André Alerme.
- Le Voyageur sans bagage. Théâtre des Mathurins: 16 February 1937. Directed by Georges Pitoëff. With Georges Pitoëff, Marthe Mellot, Louis Salou, Madeleine Milhaud.
- La Sauvage. Théâtre des Mathurins: 10 January 1938. Directed by Georges Pitoëff. With Ludmilla Pitoëff, Georges Pitoëff, Louis Salou, Madeleine Milhaud.
- Le Bal de voleurs. Théâtre des Arts: 17 September 1938. Directed by André Barsacq. With Pierre Palau, Madeleine Geoffroy.
- Léocadia. Théâtre de la Michodière: 28 November 1940. Directed by André Barsacq. With Pierre Fresnay, Yvonne Printemps, Marguerite Deval.
- Le Rendez-vous de Senlis. Théâtre de l'Atelier: 30 January 1941. Directed by André Barsacq. With Michel Vitold, Denise Bosc, Jean Dasté, Madeleine Geoffroy, Georges Rollin, Monelle Valentin.
- Eurydice. Théâtre de l'Atelier: 18 December 1941. Directed by André Barsacq. With Alain Cuny, Monelle Valentin, Jean Dasté, Auguste Boverio.
- Antigone. Théâtre de l'Atelier: 4 February 1944. Directed by André Barsacq. With Monelle Valentin, Jean Davy, Auguste Boverio, André Le Gall.
- Roméo et Jeanette. Théâtre de l'Atelier: 20 November 1946. Directed by André Barsacq. With Maria Casarès, Jean Chevrier (later: Jean Vilar), Suzanne Flon, Michel Bouquet.
- L'Invitation au château. Théâtre de l'Atelier: 4 November 1947. Directed by André Barsacq. With Michel Bouquet, Dany Robin, Betty Daussmond, Robert Vattier, Madeleine Geoffroy.
- Épisode de la vie d'un auteur. Comédie des Champs-Elysées: 3 November 1948. Directed by Roland Piétri. With Claude Sainval, Héléna Manson, Jean-Paul Roussillon.
- Ardèle ou la Marguerite. Comédie des Champs-Elysées: 3 November 1948. Directed by Roland Piétri. With Marcel Pérès, Jacques Castelot, Mary Morgan, Claude Sainval, Andrée Clément.
- La Répétition ou l'Amour puni. Théâtre Marigny: 25 October 1950. Directed by Jean-Louis Barrault. With Jean-Louis Barrault, Jean Servais, Madeleine Renaud, Simone Valère.
- Colombe. Théâtre de l'Atelier: 11 February 1951. Directed by André Barsacq. With Marie Ventura, Danièle Delorme, Yves Robert.
- La Valse des toréadors. Comédie des Champs-Elysées: 9 January 1952. Directed by Roland Piétri. With Claude Sainval, Marie Ventura, Madeleine Barbulée, François Guérin.
- L'Alouette. Théâtre Montparnasse-Gaston Baty: 14 October 1952. Directed by the author and Roland Piétri. With Suzanne Flon, Michel Bouquet, Marcel André.
- Médée. Théâtre de l'Atelier: 26 March 1953. Directed by André Barsacq. With Jean Servais, Michèle Alfa, Jean-Paul Belmondo. (First produced in Hamburg, Germany on 2 November 1948.)
- Cécile ou l'École des pères. Comédie des Champs-Elysées: 29 October 1954. Directed by Roland Piétri. With Henri Guisol, Catherine Anouilh, Maurice Méric.
- Ornifle ou le Courant d'air. Comédie des Champs-Elysées: 4 November 1955. Directed by Claude Sainval. With Pierre Brasseur, Jacqueline Maillan, Louis de Funès, Catherine Anouilh.
- Pauvre Bitos ou le Dîner de têtes. Théâtre Montparnasse-Gaston Baty: 12 October 1956. Directed by the author and Roland Piétri. With Michel Bouquet, Bruno Cremer, Pierre Mondy, Roland Piétri.
- L'Hurluberlu ou le Réactionnaire amoureux. Comédie des Champs-Elysées: 5 February 1959. Directed by Roland Piétri. With Paul Meurisse, Jean Claudio, Dominique Blanchar, Édith Scob.
- Becket ou l'Honneur de Dieu. Théâtre Montparnasse-Gaston Baty: 1 October 1959. Directed by the author and Roland Piétri. With Daniel Ivernel and Bruno Cremer.
- La Petite Molière. Co-written by Roland Laudenbach. Odéon-Théâtre de France: 12 November 1959. Directed by Jean-Louis Barrault. With Jean-Louis Barrault, Madeleine Renaud, Simone Valère, Jean Desailly, Catherine Anouilh.
- Le Songe du critique. Comédie des Champs-Elysées: 5 November 1960. Directed by the author. With Jean Le Poulain, Denise Benoît, François Périer, Claude Sainval, Roland Piétri.
- La Grotte. Théâtre Montparnasse-Gaston Baty: 6 October 1961. Directed by the author and Roland Piétri. With Jean Le Poulain, Lila Kedrova.
- L'Orchestre. Comédie des Champs-Elysées: 20 October 1962. Directed by the author and Roland Piétri. With Madeleine Barbulée, Dominique Davray, Henri Virlogeux.
- La Foire d'empoigne. Comédie des Champs-Elysées: 20 October 1962. Directed by the author and Roland Piétri. With Paul Meurisse, Henri Virlogeux.
- Le Boulanger, la boulangère et le petit mitron. Comédie des Champs-Elysées: 14 November 1968. Directed by the author and Roland Piétri. With Michel Bouquet, Sophie Daumier, Jean Parédès, Édith Scob.
- Cher Antoine ou l'Amour raté. Comédie des Champs-Elysées: 1 October 1969. Directed by the author and Roland Piétri. With Jacques François, Françoise Rosay, Francine Bergé.
- Les Poissons rouges ou Mon père ce héros. Théâtre de l'Œuvre: 21 January 1970. Directed by the author and Roland Piétri. With Marcel Galabru, Jean-Pierre Marielle, Lyne Chardonnet, Madeleine Barbulée.
- Ne réveillez pas Madame. Comédie des Champs-Elysées: 21 October 1970. Directed by the author and Roland Piétri. With François Périer, Jean Parédès, Danièle Lebrun.
- Tu étais si gentil quand tu étais petit. Théâtre Antoine: 17 January 1972. Directed by the author and Roland Piétri. With Francine Bergé, Danièle Lebrun, Claude Giraud.
- Le Directeur de l'Opéra. Comédie des Champs-Elysées: 27 September 1972. Directed by the author and Roland Piétri. With Paul Meurisse, Jean Parédès, Madeleine Barbulée.
- Monsieur Barnett. Café-Théâtre des Halles: 29 October 1974. Directed by Nicole Anouilh. With Jean Périmony, Bernard Tixier, Christine Murillo. (First produced in Bristol, UK on 12 September 1967.)
- L'Arrestation. Théâtre de l'Athénée: 20 September 1975. Directed by the author and Roland Piétri. With Claude Dauphin, Jacques François, Geneviève Fontanel.
- Le Scénario. Théâtre de l'Œuvre: 29 September 1976. Directed by the author and Roland Piétri. With Daniel Gélin, Jacques Fabbri, Sabine Azéma.
- Chers zoiseaux. Comédie des Champs-Elysées: 3 December 1976. Directed by the author and Roland Piétri. With Guy Tréjan, Françoise Brion, Jacques Castelot, Michel Lonsdale.
- La Culotte. Théâtre de l'Atelier: 19 September 1978. Directed by the author and Roland Piétri. With Jean-Pierre Marielle, Christian Marin, Gilberte Géniat.
- Le Nombril, Paris, Théâtre de l'Atelier: 24 September 1981. Directed by the author and Roland Piétri. With Bernard Blier, Françoise Brion, Guy Grosso, Christian Marin.

=== Selected theatre productions: UK ===
- Identity Unknown (Le Voyageur sans bagage). Duke of York's Theatre, London: 5 December 1937. Presented by the London International Theatre Club. With Bernard Lee, Mary Merrall, Alan Napier, Catherine Lacey.
- Antigone. New Theatre, London: 10 February 1949. Directed by Laurence Olivier. With Laurence Olivier, Vivien Leigh, George Relph, Terence Morgan.
- Fading Mansion (Roméo et Jeanette). Duchess Theatre, London: 31 August 1949. Directed by Anthony Bushell. With Siobhan McKenna, George Relph, Michael Gough.
- Ring Round the Moon (L'Invitation au château). Globe Theatre, London: 26 January 1950. Directed by Peter Brook. With Paul Scofield, Claire Bloom, Margaret Rutherford, Cecil Trouncer, Mona Washbourne.
- Point of Departure (Eurydice). Duke of York's Theatre, London: 26 December 1950. Directed by Peter Ashmore. With Dirk Bogarde (later: Peter Finch), Mai Zetterling, Hugh Griffith, Stephen Murray, Eric Pohlmann.
- Ardèle. Vaudeville Theatre, London: 30 August 1951. Directed by Anthony Pelissier. With George Relph, Ronald Squire, Isabel Jeans, Nicholas Phipps, Veronica Hurst.
- Colombe. New Theatre, London: 13 December 1951. Directed by Peter Brook. With Yvonne Arnaud, Joyce Redman, Michael Gough, John Stratton.
- Thieves' Carnival. Arts Theatre, London: 2 January 1952. Directed by Roy Rich. With John Laurie, Harold Lang, Robin Bailey, Maxine Audley.
- Time Remembered (Léocadia). Lyric Hammersmith, London: 2 December 1954. Directed by William Chappell. With Mary Ure, Paul Scofield, Margaret Rutherford.
- The Lark. Lyric Hammersmith, London: 11 May 1955. Directed by Peter Brook. With Dorothy Tutin, Richard Johnson, Donald Pleasence, Leo McKern.
- The Ermine. Nottingham Playhouse: 19 September 1955. Directed by John Harrison. With Frederick Bartman, Daphne Slater, Mavis Edwards, Joan Plowright.
- The Waltz of the Toreadors. Arts Theatre, London: 24 February 1956. Then Criterion Theare, London: 27 March 1956. Directed by Peter Hall. With Hugh Griffith, Beatrix Lehmann, Brenda Bruce (later: Renée Asherson), Trader Faulkner.
- Restless Heart (La Sauvage). St James's Theatre, London: 8 May 1957. Directed by William Chappell. With Mai Zetterling, Donald Pleasence, George Baker, Peter Bull.
- Dinner with the Family (Le Rendez-vous de Senlis). New Theatre, London: 10 December 1957. Directed by Frank Hauser. With John Justin, Jill Bennett, Alan MacNaughtan, Lally Bowers, Ian Hendry.
- Jezebel. Oxford Playhouse: 22 September 1958. Directed by Frank Hauser. With Dirk Bogarde, Hermione Baddeley, Doreen Aris. (Premiered in Rio de Janeiro in 1942, this play was never produced in France.)
- Traveller Without Luggage. Arts Theatre, London: 29 January 1959. Directed by Peter Hall. With Denholm Elliott, Joyce Carey, Geoffrey Keen, Elizabeth Sellars.
- The Rehearsal (La Répétition ou l'Amour puni). Globe Theatre, London: 6 April 1961. Directed by John Hale. With Alan Badel, Phyllis Calvert, Robert Hardy, Maggie Smith (later: Jennifer Daniel).
- Becket. Aldwych Theatre, London: 11 July 1961. Then Globe Theatre, London: 13 December 1961. Directed by Peter Hall. With Christopher Plummer and Eric Porter.
- Poor Bitos. Arts Theatre, London: 13 November 1963. Then Duke of York's Theatre, London: 6 January 1964. Directed by Shirley Butler. With Donald Pleasence (later: Peter Woodthorpe), Charles Gray, Ronald Lewis, Terence Alexander.
- The Cavern (La Grotte). Strand Theatre, London: 11 November 1965. Directed by Donald McWhinnie. With Alec McCowen, Siobhan McKenna, Griffith Jones, Gemma Jones.
- The Fighting Cock (L'Hurluberlu ou le Réactionnaire amoureux). Festival Theatre, Chichester: 7 June 1966. Then Duke of York's Theatre, London: 25 October 1966. Directed by Norman Marshall. With John Clements, Zena Walker, John Standing.
- Monsieur Barnett plus The Orchestra. Bristol Old Vic Company, Bristol: 12 September 1967. Directed by Antony Tuckey. With Martin Friend, Stephanie Beacham, Maggie Jones, Thelma Barlow, Marcia Warren.
- Ring Round the Moon. Haymarket Theatre, London: 30 October 1968. Directed by Noel Willman. With John Standing, Maureen O'Brien, Isabel Jeans, Bill Fraser, Flora Robson.
- Dear Antoine. Festival Theatre, Chichester: 19 May 1971. Then Piccadilly Theatre, London: 3 November 1971. Directed by Robin Phillips. With John Clements, Edith Evans (Isabel Jeans in London), Joyce Redman, Renée Asherson.
- The Baker, the Baker's Wife and the Baker's Boy. University Theatre, Newcastle: 28 September 1972. Directed by Gareth Morgan. With Freddie Jones, Yvonne Mitchell, Tim Barlow, Gillian Hanna.
- The Director of the Opera. Festival Theatre, Chichester: 8 May 1973. Directed by Peter Dews. With John Clements, Richard Pearson, Penelope Wilton.
- The Waltz of the Toreadors. Haymarket Theatre, London: 14 February 1974. Directed by Peter Dews. With Trevor Howard, Coral Browne, Zena Walker, Ian Ogilvy.
- You Were So Sweet When You Were Little. New End Theatre, London: 9 April 1974. Directed by Misha Williams. With Angela Pleasence, Paul Jones, Andrew Crawford.
- The Arrest. Bristol Old Vic, Bristol: 27 November 1974. Directed by Val May. With Alan Dobie, John Hurt, Michael Rothwell, Charlotte Cornwell. (World premiere.)
- Ardèle. Queen's Theatre, London: 18 June 1975. Directed by Frith Banbury. With Charles Gray, Vincent Price, Coral Browne, Allan Cuthbertson, Lalla Ward.
- The Scenario. Forum Theatre, Billingham: 29 November 1976. Directed by Stuart Burge. With Trevor Howard, Gary Bond, John Bluthal, Angela Douglas.
- The Rehearsal. Yvonne Arnaud Theatre, Guildford: 18 January 1983, then touring. Directed by Gillian Lynne. With Dinsdale Landen, Leslie Caron, Peter Jeffrey, Lalla Ward.
- Number One (Le Nombril). Theatre Royal, Windsor: 13 March 1984. Then Queen's Theatre, London: 24 April 1984. Directed by Robert Chetwyn. With Leo McKern, Margaret Whiting, Anthony Sharp, Peter Blythe.
- Ring Round the Moon. Festival Theatre, Chichester: 1 August 1988. Directed by Elijah Moshinsky. With Michael Siberry, Holly Aird, Googie Withers, José Ferrer, June Whitfield.
- Eurydice. Minerva Theatre, Chichester: 6 June 1990. Directed by Michael Rudman. With William Oxborrow, Shirley Henderson, Simon McBurney.
- The Rehearsal. Almeida Theatre, London: 13 September 1990. Then Garrick Theatre, London: 14 November 1990. Directed by Ian McDiarmid. With Jonathan Kent (later: Miles Anderson), Nicola Pagett (later: Mel Martin), Jonathan Hyde (later: Gary Bond), Julia Ormond (later: Valerie Gogan).
- Becket. Haymarket Theatre, London: 8 October 1991. Directed by Elijah Moshinsky. With Robert Lindsay and Derek Jacobi.
- Mademoiselle Colombe. Bridewell Theatre, London: 4 October 2000. Directed by Graeme Messer. With Honor Blackman, Donald Pickering, Sophie Bold.
- Wild Orchids (Léocadia). Festival Theatre, Chichester: 29 May 2002. Directed by Edward Kemp. With Catherine Walker, Andrew Scarborough, Patricia Routledge.
- The Waltz of the Toreadors. Minerva Theatre, Chichester: 16 June 2007. Directed by Angus Jackson. With Peter Bowles, Maggie Steed, Catherine Russell, Al Weaver.
- Ring Round the Moon. Playhouse Theatre, London: 19 February 2008. Directed by Sean Mathias. With JJ Feild, Fiona Button, Angela Thorne, Leigh Lawson, Belinda Lang.
- The Rehearsal. Minerva Theatre, Chichester: 18 May 2015. Directed by Jeremy Sams. With Edward Bennett, Niamh Cusack, Jamie Glover, Gabrielle Dempsey.
- Welcome Home, Captain Fox! (Le Voyageur sans bagage). Donmar Warehouse, London: 6 March 2016. Directed by Blanche McIntyre. With Rory Keenan, Sian Thomas, Fenella Woolgar.
- The Orchestra. Omnibus Theatre, London: 29 January 2019. Directed by Kristine Landon-Smith. With Amanda Osborne, Sarah Waddell, Stefania Licari.

=== Selected theatre productions: USA ===
- Antigone. Cort Theatre, New York City: 18 February 1946. Directed by Guthrie McClintic. With Katharine Cornell, Cedric Hardwicke.
- Cry of the Peacock (Ardèle ou la Marguerite). Mansfield Theatre, New York City: 11 April 1950. Directed by Martin Ritt. With Raymond Lovell, Oscar Karlweis, Marta Linden.
- Ring Round the Moon (L'Invitation au château). Martin Beck Theatre, New York City: 23 November 1950. Directed by Gilbert Miller. With Denholm Elliott, Stella Andrew, Lucile Watson, Oscar Karlweis, Brenda Forbes.
- Legend of Lovers (Eurydice). Plymouth Theatre, New York City: 26 December 1951. Directed by Peter Ashmore. With Richard Burton, Dorothy McGuire, Hugh Griffith, Noel Willman.
- Mademoiselle Colombe. Longacre Theatre, New York City: 6 January 1954. Directed by Harold Clurman. With Edna Best, Julie Harris, Eli Wallach.
- Thieves' Carnival. Cherry Lane Theatre, New York City (off-Broadway): 1 June 1955. Directed by Warren Enters. With William LeMassena, Stuart Vaughan, Tom Bosley, Frances Sternhagen.
- The Lark. Longacre Theatre, New York City: 17 November 1955. Directed by Joseph Anthony. With Julie Harris, Theodore Bikel, Boris Karloff, Christopher Plummer, Joseph Wiseman, Paul Roebling.
- The Waltz of the Toreadors. Coronet Theatre, New York City: 17 January 1957. Directed by Harold Clurman. With Ralph Richardson (later: Melvyn Douglas), Mildred Natwick.
- Time Remembered (Léocadia). Morosco Theatre, New York City: 12 November 1957. Directed by Albert Marre. With Richard Burton, Susan Strasberg, Helen Hayes.
- The Fighting Cock (L'Hurluberlu ou le Réactionnaire amoureux). ANTA Playhouse, New York City: 8 December 1959. Directed by Peter Brook. With Rex Harrison, Roddy McDowall, Natasha Parry, Michael Gough, Alan MacNaughtan, Arthur Treacher.
- Jeanette (Roméo et Jeanette). Maidman Playhouse, New York City (off-Broadway): 24 March 1960. Directed by Harold Clurman. With Juleen Compton, Geoffrey Horne, Patricia Bosworth, Sorrell Booke.
- Becket. St James Theatre, New York City: 5 October 1960. Directed by Peter Glenville. With Laurence Olivier and Anthony Quinn. Then Hudson Theatre, New York City: 8 May 1961, with Olivier and Arthur Kennedy.
- The Rehearsal. Royale Theatre, New York City: 23 September 1963. Directed by Peter Coe. With Alan Badel, Coral Browne, Keith Michell, Jennifer Hilary.
- Traveller Without Luggage. ANTA Playhouse, New York City: 17 September 1964. Directed by Robert Lewis. With Ben Gazzara, Mildred Dunnock.
- Poor Bitos. Cort Theatre, New York City: 14 November 1964. Directed by Shirley Butler. With Donald Pleasence, Charles Gray.
- Antigone. American Shakespeare Festival Theatre, Stratford, Connecticut: 18 June 1967. Directed by Jerome Kilty. With Maria Tucci, Morris Carnovsky, Tom Aldredge.
- The Orchestra. Academy Playhouse, Lake Forest, Illinois: summer 1973. Directed by José Quintero.
- The Waltz of the Toreadors. Circle in the Square Theatre, New York City: 13 September 1973. Directed by Brian Murray. With Eli Wallach, Anne Jackson, Diana Van der Vlis, Ben Masters.
- Ring Round the Moon. Ahmanson Theatre, Los Angeles: 27 March 1975. Directed by Joseph Hardy. With Michael York, Kitty Winn, Glynis Johns, Kurt Kasznar, Rosemary Murphy.
- The Waltz of the Toreadors. Union Square Theatre (off-Broadway): 25 September 1985. Directed by Richard Russell Ramos. With Lee Richardson, Tammy Grimes, Carole Shelley, Alvin Epstein.
- The Rehearsal. Criterion Center Stage Right, New York City: 21 November 1996. Directed by Nicholas Martin. With Roger Rees, Frances Conroy, David Threlfall, Anna Gunn.
- Ring Round the Moon. Belasco Theatre, New York City: 28 April 1999. Directed by Gerald Gutierrez. With Toby Stephens, Gretchen Egolf, Marian Seldes, Fritz Weaver, Joyce Van Patten.

=== Selected film credits ===
- Les Dégourdis de la onzième by Jean Anouilh et al. 1936.
- Vous n'avez rien à déclarer? by Jean Anouilh et al. 1937.
- La Citadelle du silence by Jean Anouilh et al. Impérial Film, 1937.
- Les Otages by Jean Anouilh et al. Nero-Film AG, 1938.
- Calvacade d'amour by Jean Anouilh and Jean Aurenche. Pressburger Films, 1940.
- Marie-Martine by Jean Anouilh (uncredited) and Jacques Viot. Eclair-Journal, 1943.
- Le Voyageur sans bagage by Jean Anouilh and Jean Aurenche, based on Anouilh's play. Also directed by Anouilh. Eclair-Journal, 1944.
- Monsieur Vincent by Jean Anouilh, Jean Bernard-Luc and Maurice Cloche. EDIC/Union Générale Cinématographique, 1947.
- Anna Karenina by Jean Anouilh, Guy Morgan and Julien Duvivier. London Film Productions, 1948.
- White Paws by Jean Anouilh and Jean Bernard-Luc. Majestic Films, 1949.
- Caroline chérie by Jean Anouilh and Cécil Saint-Laurent. Cinéphonic/ Gaumont, 1950.
- Two Pennies Worth of Violets by Monelle Valentin and (uncredited) Jean Anouilh. Also directed by Anouilh. Gaumont, 1951.
- Le Rideau rouge by Jean Anouilh and André Barsacq. Gaumont, 1952.
- Monsoon. Screenplay by Forest Judd, David Robinson and Leonardo Bercovici, based on the Anouilh play Roméo et Jeannette. CFG Productions/Film Group Judd, 1952.
- A Caprice of Darling Caroline by Jean Anouilh and Cécil Saint-Laurent. Cinéphonic, 1953.
- Le Chevalier de la nuit by Jean Anouilh and Robert Darène. Telenet Film, 1954.
- La Mort de Belle by Jean Anouilh, after Georges Simenon. Cinéphonic/Odeon, 1961.
- Waltz of the Toreadors. Screenplay by Wolf Mankowitz, from the play by Jean Anouilh. With Peter Sellers, Dany Robin, Margaret Leighton, Cyril Cusack. Independent Artists, 1962.
- Becket. Screenplay by Edward Anhalt, from the play by Jean Anouilh. With Peter O'Toole, Richard Burton, John Gielgud. Hal Wallis Productions, 1964.
- La Ronde by Jean Anouilh, after Arthur Schnitzler. Interopa Film/Paris Film Productions/Société Nouvelle Pathé Cinéma, 1964.
- Piége pour Cendrillon by Jean Anouilh and André Cayatte, after Sébastien Japrisot. Gaumont International/Jolly Film, 1965.
- A Time for Loving by Jean Anouilh. London Screenplays, 1971.
- O, ra tkbilia ganshorebis es nazi sevda (Oh, How Sweet is This Tender Sadness on Parting). Screenplay by Keti Dolidze, based on the Anouilh play Eurydice. Georgian-Film, 1991.
- Vous n'avez encore rien vu (You Ain't Seen Nothin' Yet). Screenplay by Alain Resnais and Laurent Herbiet, based on the Anouilh plays Eurydice and Cher Antoine ou l'Amour raté. F Comme Film, 2012.

=== Selected television productions ===
- Catch as Catch Can (aka) 'The Rehearsal', or 'Le Balcon' ('The Balcony'), Wednesday Play, 1964 (30th. Sept.). Kenneth Williams as Napoleon.
- The Lark, translated from L'Alouette. BBC Saturday-Night Theatre, 1956.
- Le Jeune Homme et le Lion. 1976.
- Histoire du chevalier des Grieux et de Manon Lescaut. Hungarian TV/ Télécip, 1978.
- La Belle vie. 1979.
- Le Diable amoureux by Jean Anouilh et al. Bayerischer Rundfunk/France2/ Radiotelevisão Portuguesa/Telmondis/Westdeutscher Rundfunk, 1991.

=== Published plays ===
- Y'avait un prisonnier (Paris: L'Illustration, 1935).
- Le Voyageur sans bagage (Paris: L'Illustration, 1937); translated by John Whiting as Traveler without Luggage (London: Methuen, 1959).
- Les Bal des voleurs (Paris: Fayard, 1938).
- Antigone (Paris: Didier, 1942); translated by Lewis Galantière as Antigone (New York: Random House, 1946).
- Pièces roses (Paris: Calmann-Lévy, 1942) – comprises Le Bal des voleurs, Le Rendez-vous de Senlis, and Léocadia; Le Bal des voleurs translated by Lucienne Hill as Thieves' Carnival (London: Methuen, 1952); Le Rendez-vous de Senlis translated by Edwin O. Marsh as Dinner with the Family (London: Methuen, 1958); Léocadia translated by Patricia Moyes as Time Remembered (London: S. French, 1954).
- Pièces noires (Paris: Calmann-Lévy, 1942) – comprises L'Hermine, La Sauvage, Le Voyageur sans bagage, and Eurydice; L'Hermine translated by Miriam John as The Ermine, in Jean Anouilh ... Plays, volume 1 (New York: Hill & Wang, 1958); La Sauvage translated by Hill as Restless Heart (London: Methuen, 1957); Eurydice translated by Kitty Black as Point of Departure (London: S. French, 1951); republished as Legend of Lovers (New York: Coward-McCann, 1952).
- Nouvelles pièces noires (Paris: La Table Ronde, 1946) – comprises Jézabel, Antigone, Roméo et Jeannette, and Médée; Roméo et Jeannette translated by John as Romeo and Jeannette, in Jean Anouilh ... Plays, volume 1 (New York : Hill & Wang, 1958); "Médée" translated in The Modern Theatre, volume 5, edited by Eric Bentley (Garden City, N.Y.: Doubleday, 1957).
- Pièces brillantes (Paris: La Table Ronde, 1951) – comprises L'Invitation au château, Colombe, La Répétition, ou L'Amour puni, and Cécile, ou L'Ecole des pères;
- L'Invitation au château translated by Christopher Fry as Ring round the Moon (London: Methuen, 1950); Colombe translated by Louis Kronenberger as Mademoiselle Colombe (New York: Coward-McCann, 1954).
- L'Alouette (Paris: La Table Ronde, 1953); translated by Fry as The Lark (London: Methuen, 1955).
- Pièces grinçantes (Paris: La Table ronde, 1956) – comprises Ardèle, ou La Marguerite, La Valse des Toréadors, Ornifle, ou Le Courant d'air, and Pauvre Bitos, ou Le Dîner de têtes; Ardèle, ou La Marguerite translated by Hill as Ardèle (London: Methuen, 1951); La Valse des Toréadors translated by Hill as Waltz of the Toreadors (London: Elek, 1953; New York: Coward-McCann, 1953); Ornifle, ou Le Courant d'air translated by Hill as It's Later Than You Think (Chicago: Dramatic, 1970); Pauvre Bitos, ou Le dîner de têtes translated by Hill as Poor Bitos (London: Methuen, 1956).
- Humulus le muet, with Jean Aurenche (Grenoble: Françaises Nouvelles, 1958).
- Becket, ou L'Honneur de Dieu (Paris: La Table Ronde, 1959); translated by Hill as Becket, or The Honor of God (New York: Coward-McCann, 1960).
- La Petite Molière (Paris: L'Avant-Scène, 1959).
- L'Hurluberlu, ou Le Réactionnaire amoureux (Paris: La Table Ronde, 1959); translated by Hill as The Fighting Cock (London: Methuen, 1967).
- Madame de ..., translated by Whiting (London: S. French, 1959).
- Le Songe du critique, edited by Richard Fenzl, (Dortmund: Lensing, 1960).
- La Foire d'empoigne (Paris: La Table Ronde, 1960); translated by Anouilh and Roland Piétri as Catch as Catch Can, in Jean Anouilh ... Plays, volume 3 (New York: Hill & Wang, 1967).
- La Grotte (Paris: La Table Ronde, 1961); translated by Hill as The Cavern (New York: Hill & Wang, 1966).
- Fables (Paris: La Table Ronde, 1962).
- Le Boulanger, la boulangère, et le petit mitron (Paris: La Table Ronde, 1969).
- Cher Antoine, ou L'Amour rate (Paris: La Table Ronde, 1969); translated by Hill as Dear Antoine, or The Love That Failed (New York: Hill & Wang, 1971; London: Eyre Methuen, 1971).
- Les Poissons rouges, ou Mon Père, ce héros (Paris: La Table Ronde, 1970).
- Ne Réveillez pas Madame (Paris: La Table Ronde, 1970).
- Nouvelles Pièces grinçantes (Paris: La Table Ronde, 1970)--includes L'Hurluberlu, ou Le Réactionnaire amoureux, La Grotte, L'Orchestre, Le Boulanger, la boulangère, et le petit mitron, and Les Poissons rouges, ou Mon Père, ce héros; L'Orchestre translated by John as The Orchestra, in Jean Anouilh ... Plays, volume 3 (New York: Hill & Wang, 1967).
- Tu étais si gentil quand tu étais petit (Paris: La Table Ronde, 1972).
- Le Directeur de l'opéra (Paris: La Table Ronde, 1972); translated by Hill as The Director of the Opera (London: Eyre Methuen, 1973).
- L'Arrestation (Paris: La Table Ronde, 1975); translated by Hill as The Arrest (New York: S. French, 1978).
- Le Scénario (Paris: La Table Ronde, 1976).
- Chers Zoiseaux (Paris: La Table Ronde, 1977).
- La Culotte (Paris: La Table Ronde, 1978).
- La Belle vie suivi de Episode de la vie d'un auteur (Paris: La Table Ronde, 1980).
- Le Nombril (Paris: La Table Ronde, 1981); translated by Michael Frayn as Number One (London & New York: S. French, 1985).
- Oedipe, ou Le Roi boiteux: d'après Sophocle (Paris: La Table Ronde, 1986).
- La Vicomtesse d'Eristal n'a pas reçu son balai mécanique: Souvenirs d'un jeune homme (Paris: La Table Ronde, 1987).

=== English language anthologies ===
- Jean Anouilh ... Plays, translated by Lewis Galantière et al., 3 volumes (New York: Hill & Wang, 1958–1967).
- Collected Plays, 2 volumes translated by Lucienne Hill et al. (London: Methuen, 1966, 1967).
- Five Plays by Jean Anouilh, introduction by Ned Chaillet translated by Timberlake Wertenbaker et al., (London: Methuen, 1987).
- Anouilh Plays: Two, introduction by Ned Chaillet translated by Jeremy Sams et al., (London: Methuen, 1997).

=== Theory and criticism ===
- En marge du théâtre, edited by Efrin Knight, (Paris: La Table Ronde, 2000).
- Le Dossier Molière, with Léon Thoorens et al., (Verviers: Gerard, 1964).

=== Translations by Anouilh ===
- William Shakespeare, Trois comédies: Comme il vous plaira, La Nuit des rois, Le Conte d'hiver, [Three Comedies: As You like It, Twelfth Night, and The Winter's Tale] translated by Anouilh and Claude Vincent (Paris: La Table Ronde, 1952).
- Graham Greene, L'Amant complaisant, translated by Anouilh and Nicole Anouilh (Paris: Laffont, 1962).
- Oscar Wilde, Il est important d'être aimé, [The Importance of Being Earnest] translated by Anouilh and Nicole Anouilh (Paris: Papiers, 1985).

=== Other publications ===
- Michel-Marie Poulain, by Anouilh, Pierre Imbourg, and André Warnod, preface by Michel Mourre (Paris: Braun, 1953).
- Le Loup, ballet scenario by Anouilh and Georges Neveux, music by Henri Dutilleux (Paris: Ricordi, 1953).
