= Humulus le muet =

1948 play by Jean Anouilh

Humulus le muet (Humulus the Mute) is a 1948 play by French dramatist Jean Anouilh.

It is Anouilh's first play, and was written in collaboration with Jean Aurenche. It was performed by the Compagnons de l'Arc-en-ciel in 1948 in Paris, and adapted for the screen and filmed in 1985.

== Plot ==
Humulus was not able to speak, until a doctor gave him the ability to say one word a day. He then meets a girl and falls in love with her. After months of painful silence, he decides to save up enough words to compose a declaration of his love. Just as he is about to speak, she asks if he would direct her to the beach. He does so, but that uses up all but three of his words. Suddenly afraid that he might lose his chance, he cries out to her, "Je vous aime!” In response the girl reaches into her purse, takes out an enormous ear trumpet, explains that she is hard of hearing, and says, “Will you please repeat that?”. He cannot, and because she did not hear anything, he loses both the girl and his fortune.

== Characters ==
- The Duchess
- Hector de Brignoc
- Humulus
- a gypsy
- Helene
- The servants
