= Les Poissons rouges ou Mon père ce héros =

Play written by Jean Anouilh

Les Poissons rouges ou Mon père ce héros is a play by French dramatist Jean Anouilh. It premiered at the Théâtre de l'Œuvre on 21 January 1970.

== Original cast and characters ==
- Jean-Pierre Marielle: Antoine de Saint-Flour
- Michel Galabru: La Surette
- Yvonne Clech: Charlotte de Saint-Flour
- Marie-Claire Chantraine: Edwiga Pataques
- Claude Stermann: Toto de Saint-Flour
- Lyne Chardonnet: Camomille de Saint-Flour
- Madeleine Barbulée: Mme Prudent
- Nicole Vassel: Adèle/la voix du bébé
- Pascal Mazzotti: médecin bossu
- Edith Perret: dame
- Marcelle Arnold: dame
- Gilberte Géniat: bonne de l'auberge de la mer/couturière
