= Chers zoiseaux =

Chers Zoiseaux is a 1976 play by French dramatist Jean Anouilh.
