= Artistic-Athévains =

Theatre in Paris, France

Artistic Athévains
- Folies Artistic (1913–?), Artistic Concert (?–1935?), Artistic Voltaire (1935–70), Artistic Athévains (1980–present)
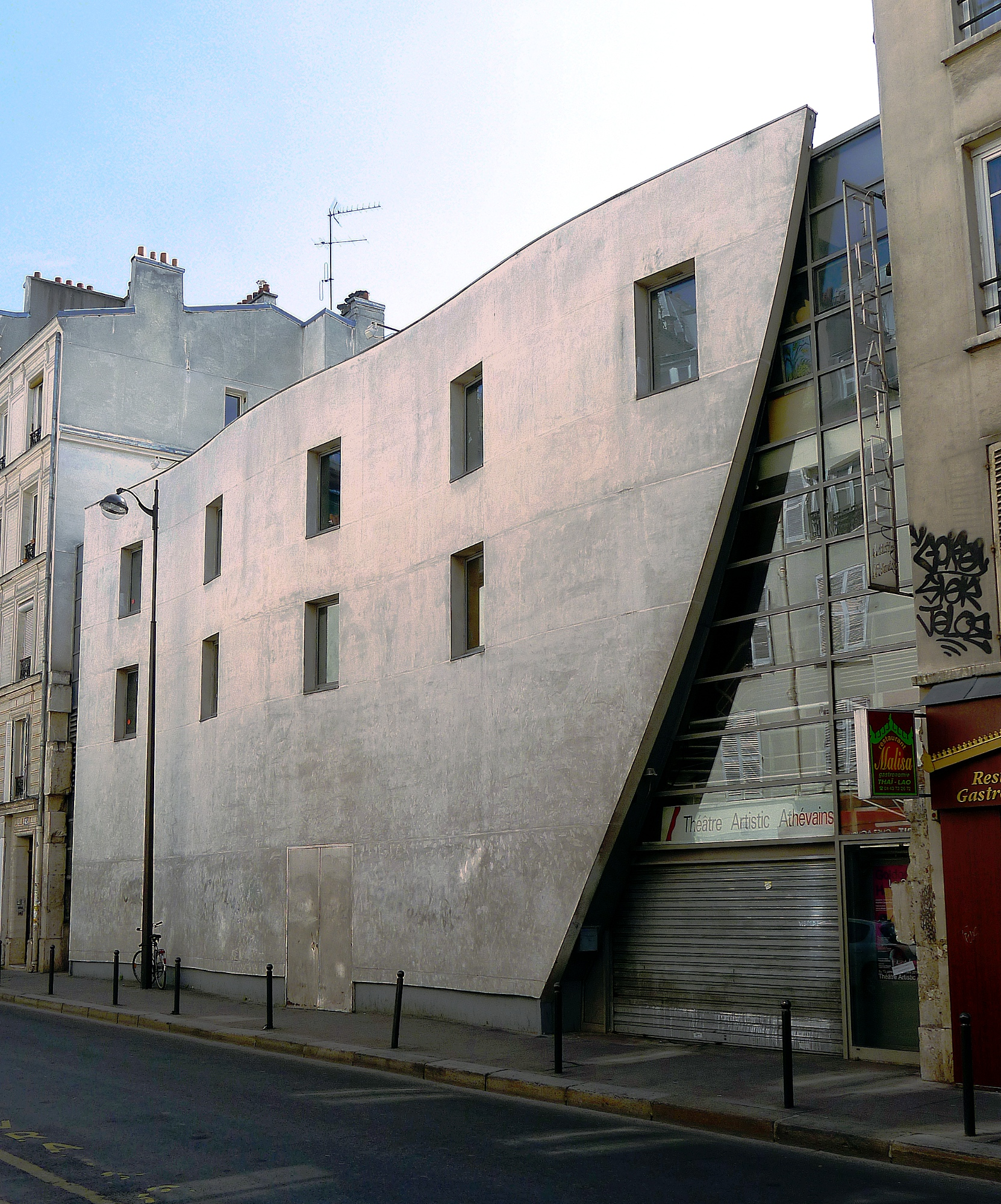
- An image of Artistic-Athévains
- Interactive map of Artistic Athévains
- Address: 45 bis rue Richard-Lenoir, 11th arrondissement Paris
- Coordinates: 48°51′24″N 2°22′52″E
- Capacity: 220 + 117 seats

Construction
- Opened: 1913

Website
- artistictheatre.com

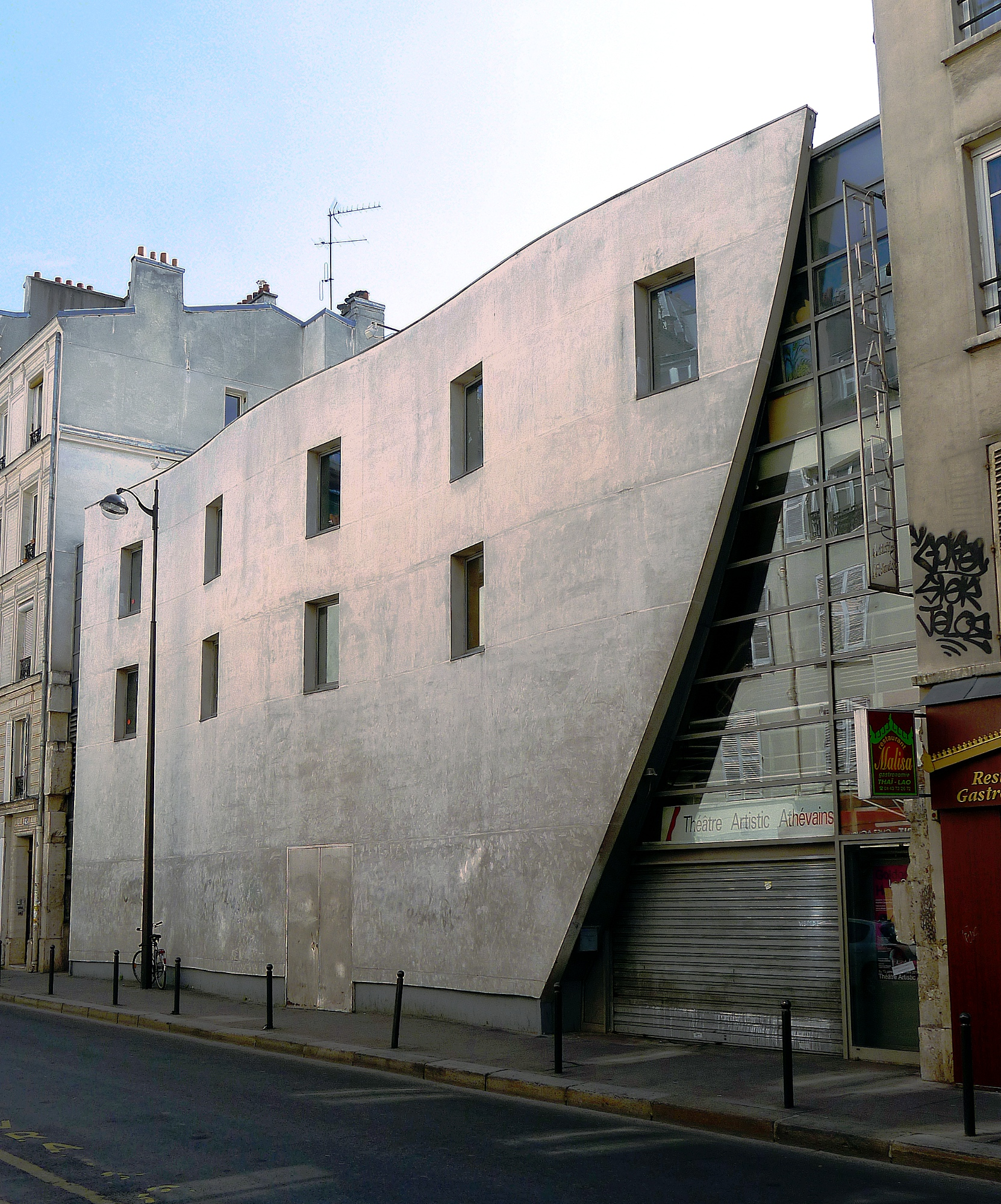

Artistic Athévains is a theatre in Paris, located at 45 bis rue Richard-Lenoir in the 11th arrondissement. It was originally a café-concert, dating from the beginning of the 20th century.

== History ==
In 1913, the café-concert took the name 'Folies Artistic'. In the 1920s, it became the 'Artistic Concert', presenting revues, opérettes and vaudevilles. In 1935, as the 'Artistic Voltaire', it became a cinema which lasted until 1970. In 1980, it once again became a theatre and was renamed the 'Artistic Athévains'. The repertoire is basically contemporary, though the classics are sometimes performed.

The theatre is directed by Anne-Marie Lazarini and Dominique Bourde. Recent productions have included lesser-known works by Carlo Goldoni, Leo Tolstoi, Eugène Labiche, Robert de Flers and Gaston de Caillavet, as well as modern works by Michel Vinaver (Les travaux et les jours) and Robert Pinget (Ici ou ailleurs) — also Molière's major classic George Dandin.
