= Lance Secretan =

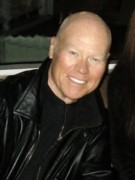
Lance H.K.Secretan

Lance H.K. Secretan (born in Amersham, United Kingdom) is a British-Canadian author of business books, best known for his work in leadership theory and how to inspire teams. A former child actor, from 1967 to 1980, Secretan was the managing director of Manpower Limited, the British subsidiary of Manpower Inc. Between 1980 and 1985, he taught leadership at McMaster and then York University in Canada and since 1985, he has worked as an author, independent management consultant, and coach and keynote speaker.

== Education ==
Secretan holds a M.A. (magna cum laude) from the University of Southern California, which he received in 1977, and he earned a PhD in International Relations from the London School of Economics in 1980.

== Publications ==
=== Books ===
- The Bellwether Effect: Stop Following. Start Inspiring, The Secretan Center Inc, (2018) ISBN 978-09865654-7-2
- Peak Performers, The Secretan Center Inc, (2018) ISBN 978-0-9865654-6-5
- A Love Story: An Intensely Personal Memoir, The Secretan Center Inc, (2015) ISBN 978-0-9865654-1-0
- The Spark, The Flame and The Torch, The Secretan Center Inc, (2010) ISBN 978-0-9865654-0-3
- ONE: The Art and Practice of Conscious Leadership, The Secretan Center Inc, (2006) ISBN 0-9733115-5-X
- Inspire! What Great Leaders Do, John Wiley, (2004) ISBN 0-471-64882-5
- Spirit@Work: Bringing Spirit and Values to Work, The Secretan Center Inc., (2002), ISBN 0-9694561-3-1
- Inspirational Leadership: Destiny, Cause and Calling, The Secretan Center Inc., (1999), ISBN 0-9694561-9-0
- Reclaiming Higher Ground: Creating Organizations that Inspire the Soul, The Secretan Center Inc., (1996), ISBN 0-07-057919-9
- Living the Moment: A Sacred Journey, The Secretan Center Inc., (1993), ISBN 0-9733115-4-1
- The Way of the Tiger: Gentle Wisdom for Turbulent Times, The Secretan Center Inc., (1989), ISBN 0-9694561-0-7
- The Masterclass: Modern Fables for Working and Living, Stoddart, (1988), ISBN 0-7737-5197-1
- Managerial Moxie: The 8 Proven Steps to Empowering Employees and Supercharging Your Company, Prima, (1993), ISBN 1-55958-159-X
- How to be an Effective Secretary, Pan Books, ISBN 978-0-330-02929-2

=== Audio discs ===
- A Love Story: An Intensely Personal Memoir ASIN B01H5KLIEE
- ONE: The Art and Practice of Conscious Leadership – An Intensive 7-Day Audio Retreat ISBN 0-9733115-9-2
- Inspire What Great Leaders Do ISBN 0-973311533
- Reclaiming Higher Ground ISBN 0-9694561-4-X
- Inspirational Leadership ISBN 0-9694561-5-8
- The Keys to the Castle ISBN 0-9694561-6-6
- The New Story of Leadership ISBN 0-9694561-7-4
- Values Centered Leadership ISBN 0-9694561-8-2
- Living the Moment CD ISBN 0-9733115-1-7
- The Calling Meditation ISBN 0-9733115-2-5

=== Other publications ===
- Love and Truth (The Business Case), Worthwhile Magazine, Sept–Oct, 2005
- Williamson, Marianne, Imagine: What America Could be in the 21st Century, Rodale, (Lance Secretan contr.) 2000, ISBN 1-57954-302-2
