= Coral Browne =

Australian actress (1913–1991)

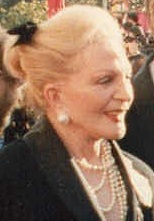
- Browne in 1989
- Born: Coral Edith Brown; 23 July 1913; Melbourne, Australia
- Died: 29 May 1991 (aged 77); Los Angeles, California, U.S.
- Occupation: Actress
- Years active: 1933–1985
- Spouses: Philip Westrope Pearman (m. 1950; died 1964) Vincent Price (m. 1974)

Coral Edith Browne (23 July 1913 – 29 May 1991) was an Australian actress. Her extensive theatre credits included Broadway productions of Macbeth (1956), The Rehearsal (1963) and The Right Honourable Gentleman (1965). She won the 1984 BAFTA TV Award for Best Actress for the BBC TV film An Englishman Abroad (1983). Her film appearances included Auntie Mame (1958), The Killing of Sister George (1968), The Ruling Class (1972) and Dreamchild (1985). Her second husband was actor Vincent Price.

== Family ==
Coral Edith Brown was the only daughter of railway clerk Leslie Clarence Brown (1890–1957), and Victoria Elizabeth Brown (1890–1989), née Bennett, both of Victorian birth. She and her two brothers were raised in Footscray, a suburb of Melbourne.

== Career ==
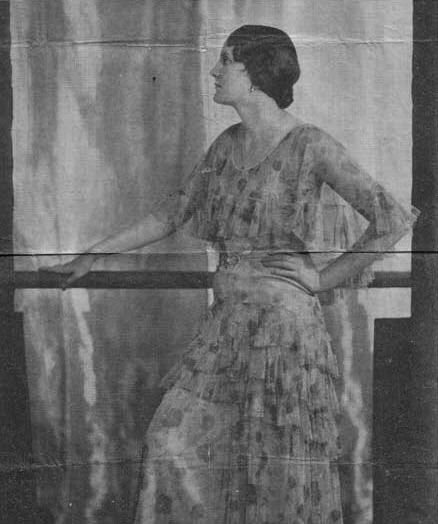
Browne in 1931

She studied at the National Gallery Art School. Her amateur debut was as Gloria in Shaw's You Never Can Tell, directed by Frank Clewlow. Gregan McMahon snapped her up for her professional debut as "Margaret Orme" in Loyalties at Melbourne's Comedy Theatre on 2 May 1931, aged 17. She was still billed as "Brown", the "e" being added in 1936.

At the age of 21, with just £50 on her and a letter of introduction to famed actress Marie Tempest from Gregan McMahon, she emigrated to England where she became established as a stage actress, notably as leading lady to Jack Buchanan in Frederick Lonsdale's The Last of Mrs Cheyney, W. Somerset Maugham's Lady Frederick and Alan Melville's Castle in the Air. She was a regular performer in productions at the Savoy Theatre in London and was resident in the hotel for many years, including throughout World War II. When the original British touring production of The Man Who Came to Dinner ran into financial difficulty and could not be produced in London, Browne borrowed money from her dentist and bought the rights to the play, successfully staging it at the Savoy. She received royalties from the play from all future productions.

She began film acting in 1936, with her more famous roles being Vera Charles in Auntie Mame (1958), Mercy Croft in The Killing of Sister George (1968), and Lady Claire Gurney in The Ruling Class (1972). Her television debut came in January 1938, when she appeared in a BBC Television production of The Billiard Room Mystery. Throughout her career, she was a regular performer on BBC Radio and appeared in numerous radio dramas, including Dinner at Eight, The Second Mrs. Tanqueray, The Caspary Affair, The Tragedy of Othello, Oedipus The King, Hamlet, The Infernal Machine, Two Mothers, Captain Brassbound's Conversion, The Eyes of Youth and Waters of the Moon amongst many others. In 1961, Browne was the featured castaway on Desert Island Discs, hosted by Roy Plomley. Television plays for the BBC included Charley's Aunt in 1969, Lady Windermere's Fan in 1972, Mrs. Warren's Profession also in 1972 and The Importance of Being Earnest in 1974.

In 1969, Browne appeared in the poorly received original production of Joe Orton's controversial farce What the Butler Saw in the West End at the Queen's Theatre with Sir Ralph Richardson, Stanley Baxter, and Hayward Morse.

While touring the Soviet Union in a Shakespeare Memorial Theatre (later the Royal Shakespeare Company) production of Hamlet in 1958, she met the spy Guy Burgess. This meeting became the basis of Alan Bennett's script for the television movie An Englishman Abroad (1983) in which Browne played herself, apparently including some of her conversations with Burgess. Burgess, who had found solace in his exile by continually playing the music of Jack Buchanan, asked Browne if she had known Buchanan. "I suppose so", the actress replied, "we nearly got married". On the BFI TV 100, a list compiled in 2000 by the British Film Institute (BFI), chosen by a poll of industry professionals, to determine what were the greatest British television programmes of any genre ever to have been screened, An Englishman Abroad was listed at No. 30.

Her other notable film of this period, Dreamchild (1986) concerned the author Lewis Carroll. In the film, Browne gave an affecting account of the later life of Alice Liddell who had inspired the tale Alice's Adventures in Wonderland.

Browne was portrayed by Prunella Scales on stage in Alan Bennett's adaptation of his play An Englishman Abroad entitled Single Spies. Penelope Wilton took the role of Browne in the BBC radio adaptation of the original film. In a televised documentary Caviar to the General broadcast on UK Channel 4 in 1990, shortly before her death, Coral Browne humorously described her reaction to seeing the stage version of An Englishman Abroad, particularly expressing her irritation at the costumes. She recalled that when she made the film version, the costume designer went to great lengths to find out what she wore at the time the story is set, but when she saw the stage costumes she exclaimed: "I fainted. The prospect of my appearing in a fake fur whatever it was, and hats that wouldn't have come out of a grab bag after Christmas at the Salvation Army... I was incensed... and I mean... and if the play ever comes to New York I shall go there with three lawyers... because I consider it a defamation." In 2018, an Australian stage play Coral Browne - This F***ing Lady was staged by Maureen Sherlock starring Genevieve Mooy as Browne. Amanda Muggleton took on the part of Browne in later productions of the play.

== Personal life ==
Browne married actor Philip Pearman in 1950, and remained married until his death in 1964. While making the film Theatre of Blood (1973), she met actor Vincent Price; they married on 24 October 1974. The two appeared together in the international stage adaptation of Ardèle, which played in the US as well as in London at the Queen's Theatre. During this run, Browne and Price starred together in the BBC Radio play Night of the Wolf, first airing in 1975. The two subsequently appeared in the 1979 CBS TV miniseries Time Express.

She became a naturalized United States citizen in 1987 as a gift to Price who later converted to Catholicism for her (she had converted many years previously).

Browne died on 29 May 1991 in Los Angeles, California, from breast cancer; she was 77. After her death, she was cremated and her ashes were scattered in the Rose Garden at Hollywood Forever Cemetery. She had no children from her marriages; Price died two years later.

== Awards ==
Browne was awarded the BAFTA Television Award for Best Actress 1984 for her role in An Englishman Abroad. She later received the London Evening Standard British Film Awards for Best Actress in 1986 for Dreamchild. In 1976, the Los Angeles Theatre Critics named her Best Actress for her role in Travesties at the Mark Taper Forum in Los Angeles.

== Personality ==
When told by the Royal Shakespeare Company that there was no suitable role in their upcoming production of King Lear for her husband, Philip Pearman, she demanded a script and running through it she found the page she was looking for. "There you are", she said, "the perfect part. A small camp near Dover."

Browne's language was colourful, which is acknowledged in the title of an unauthorized biography of her, This Effing Lady. She was a devout Catholic (by conversion). The two aspects came together in a story of her standing outside Brompton Oratory after Sunday mass when an actor came up to her with gossip about who was sleeping with someone else's wife. She stopped him in his tracks with: "I don't want to hear this filth. Not with me standing here in a state of fucking grace."

Alan Bennett: "When I said to Coral that I’d thought [Cecil] Beaton was gay she remarked, 'Not when he was with me, darling. Like a rat up a drainpipe.'"

The younger Australian performer Barry Humphries paid tribute to Browne at her memorial service with an appropriate poem: "She left behind an emptiness/A gap, a void, a trough/The world is quite a good deal less/Since Coral Browne fucked off."

== Biographies ==
- Browne was the subject of a biography, The Coral Browne Story: Theatrical Life and Times of a Lustrous Australian, by Barbara Angell. This was published May 2007 and launched at the Victorian Arts Centre, Melbourne, on 14 June of that year.
- Coral Browne: 'This Effing Lady', by Rose Collis, published by Oberon Books, was launched at the Royal National Theatre, 4 October 2007.

In 2018, an Australian stage play Coral Browne – This F***ing Lady was staged by Maureen Sherlock starring Genevieve Mooy as Browne.

== Filmography ==
=== Film ===
| Year | Title | Role | Notes |
|---|---|---|---|
| 1933 | Waltzing Matilda | | |
| 1935 | Line Engaged | Doreen | |
| 1935 | Charing Cross Road | Lady Ruston | |
| 1936 | The Amateur Gentleman | Pauline Darville | |
| 1936 | Guilty Melody | Cecile | |
| 1938 | We're Going to Be Rich | Pearl | |
| 1938 | Yellow Sands | Emma Copplestone | |
| 1939 | Footsteps in the Sand | Lily James | |
| 1939 | The Nursemaid Who Disappeared | Mabel Barnes | |
| 1940 | Let George Do It! | Iris | AKA, To Hell with Hitler |
| 1946 | Piccadilly Incident | Virginia Pearson | |
| 1947 | The Courtneys of Curzon Street | Valerie | AKA, Kathy's Love Affair |
| 1954 | Twist of Fate | Helen | |
| 1958 | Auntie Mame | Vera Charles | |
| 1961 | The Roman Spring of Mrs. Stone | Meg | |
| 1962 | Go to Blazes | Colette | |
| 1963 | Tamahine | Madame Becque | |
| 1963 | Dr. Crippen | Belle Elmore | |
| 1967 | The Night of the Generals | Eleanore von Seidlitz-Gabler | |
| 1968 | The Legend of Lylah Clare | Molly Luther | |
| 1968 | The Killing of Sister George | Mercy Croft | |
| 1972 | The Ruling Class | Lady Claire Gurney | |
| 1973 | Theatre of Blood | Chloe Moon | |
| 1975 | The Drowning Pool | Olivia Devereaux | |
| 1980 | Xanadu | Heavenly Voice #2 | Voice |
| 1984 | American Dreamer | Margaret McMann | |
| 1985 | Dreamchild | Alice Hargreaves | |
| 1987 | Sparky's Magic Piano | | Voice, Video, (final film role) |

=== Television ===
| Year | Title | Role | Notes |
|---|---|---|---|
| 1952 | Affairs of State | | TV film |
| 1955 | Simon and Laura | Laura Foster | TV film |
| 1956 | London Playhouse | Amanda Pinkerton | "The Guv'nor" |
| 1956 | ITV Television Playhouse | | "Castle in the Air" |
| 1969 | Play of the Month | Donna Lucia D'Alvadorez | "Charley's Aunt" |
| 1972 | Stage 2 | Mrs. Kitty Warren | "Mrs. Warren's Profession" |
| 1972 | Play of the Month | Mrs. Erlynne | "Lady Windermere's Fan" |
| 1974 | Play of the Month | Lady Bracknell | "The Importance of Being Earnest" |
| 1979 | Time Express | Margaret 'Maggie' Winters | Main role |
| 1982 | Eleanor, First Lady of the World | Lady Reading | TV film |
| 1983 | An Englishman Abroad | Herself | TV film |

== Notable stage ==
- A Warm Corner Comedy Theatre, Melbourne c. 1930
- The Roof Comedy Theatre, Melbourne 1931
- Loyalties Comedy Theatre, Melbourne May 1931
- Hay Fever
- The Quaker Girl
- The Apple Cart
- Dear Brutus
- Hedda Gabler
- Children in Uniform Melbourne
- Command to Love Melbourne
- Mated 1934 or 1935
- Lover's Leap, Vaudeville Theatre London 1935
- Basalik, London Arts Theatre Club 1935
- Desirable Residence, Embassy Theatre London 1935
- Heroes Don't Care, St. Martin's Theatre, London 10 June 1936
- The Taming of the Shrew, New London Theatre 1936–1937
- The Great Romancer, New London Theatre 1937
- The Gusher, Prince's Theatre, London 1937
- Believe It Or Not, New Theatre, London March 1940
- The Man Who Came to Dinner, Theatre Royal, Birmingham, England, 17 November 1941
- The Man Who Came to Dinner, Savoy Theatre, London, 4 December 1941–42
- My Sister Eileen, Savoy Theatre, London, 1943
- The Last of Mrs. Cheyney, Savoy Theatre, London 1943–44
- Lady Frederick, Savoy Theatre, London, November 1946
- Lady Frederick, Grand Theatre, Blackpool, 21 April 1947
- Lady Frederick, Theatre Royal, Brighton, 16 June 1947
- Canaries Sometimes Sing, Grand Theatre, Blackpool, 3 November 1947
- Castle in the Air, Adelphi Theatre, London, 1949–50
- Othello, Old Vic Theatre, London, 31 October 1951
- King Lear, Old Vic, London, 3 March 1952
- Affairs of State, Theatre Royal, Brighton, 28 July 1952
- Affairs of State, Cambridge Theatre, Cambridge Circus, 21 August 1952
- Affairs of State, Hippodrome, Bristol, 1953–54
- Simon And Laura, Strand Theatre, London, 1954
- Nina, Theatre Royal Haymarket, London, 27 July 1955
- Macbeth, Old Vic, London, 1955–56
- Macbeth, Hippodrome, Bristol, 1955–56
- Tamburlaine the Great, Playbill Winter Garden Theatre, New York, 19 January – 4 February 1956
- Tamburlaine the Great, Stratford, Ontario, Canada
- Macbeth, Winter Garden Theatre, New York, 29 October 1956 – 12 January 1957
- Troilus and Cressida, Winter Garden Theatre, New York, 26 December 1956 – 12 January 1957
- Hamlet, Old Vic, London, 1957–58
- A Midsummer Night's Dream, Old Vic, London, 1957–58
- The Pleasure of His Company, Theatre Royal Haymarket, London, 1957–58
- Toys in the Attic, Piccadilly Theatre, London, 10 November 1960
- Bonne Soupe, The Comedy Theatre London, 1960
- Bonne Soupe, New Theatre, Oxford, 26 September 1961
- Bonne Soupe, Wyndham's Theatre London, 13 February 1962
- The Rehearsal, Royale Theatre, New York, 23 September – 28 December 1963
- The Right Honourable Gentleman, Billy Rose Theatre, New York, 19 October 1965 – 22 January 1966
- Lady Windermere's Fan, Phoenix Theatre, London, 1966
- Lady Windermere's Fan, Theatre Royal, Brighton, 23 August 1966
- What the Butler Saw, Queen's Theatre, London, 1969
- My Darling Daisy, Lyric Theatre, London, 1970
- Mrs. Warren's Profession, Old Vic, London, 1970–71
- The Sea, Royal Court, London, 1973–74
- The Waltz of the Toreadors, Theatre Royal Haymarket, London, 1974
- Ardèle, Queen's Theatre, London, 1975
- Charley's Aunt, Cirque Dinner Theatre, Seattle, 12 August 1975
- Charley's Aunt, Granny's Dinner Theatre, Dallas, 16 March – 10 April 1976
- Charley's Aunt, National U.S. tour, 10 May – 26 June 1976
- The Importance of Being Earnest, Mark Taper Forum, Los Angeles, 1976
- Travesties, Mark Taper Forum, Los Angeles, 1976
