= List of Israeli films of 1965 =

A list of films produced by the Israeli film industry in 1965.

== 1965 releases ==
Premiere	Title	Director	Cast	Genre	Notes	Ref
22 April	Impossible on Saturday	Alex Joffé	Robert Hirsch		Israeli-French-Italian co-production	
29 April	The Hour of Truth	Henri Calef	Brett Halsey, Karlheinz Böhm, Corinne Marchand, Michèle Girardon, Daniel Gélin		Israeli-French co-production	
?	The Glass Cage	Philippe Arthuys and Jean-Louis Levi-Alvarès		Drama	Israeli-French co-production, entered into the 4th Moscow International Film Festival	
?	Shabbat Hamalka (Hebrew: שבת המלכה, lit. "The Shabbat Queen")	Ilan Eldad	Mike Burstyn	Drama		

== See also ==
- 1965 in Israel
