= Lucienne Bogaert =

French actress (1892–1983)

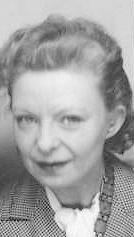
- Image of Lucienne Bogaert
- Born: Lucienne Jeanne Gabrielle Lefebvre; 6 January 1892; Caudry, Nord, France
- Died: 4 February 1983 (aged 91); Montrouge, Hauts-de-Seine, France
- Occupation: Actress
- Spouse: Robert Bogaert (divorced)

Lucienne Bogaert (born Lucienne Jeanne Gabrielle Lefebvre; 6 January 1892 in Caudry, Nord – 4 February 1983 in Montrouge, Hauts-de-Seine) was a French actress. She started her career in theatre, but later also worked in film. After she divorced her husband Robert Bogaert, she retained his name for professional purposes.

== Career ==
After her stage debut, Bogaert joined the company at the Théâtre du Vieux-Colombier and then worked with Louis Jouvet at the Théâtre des Champs-Élysées where she played the role of The Sphinx in Jean Cocteau's The Infernal Machine. On film she was often cast in the role of mothers such as in Robert Bresson's Les Dames du Bois de Boulogne and in Julien Duvivier's Voici le temps des assassins.

== Stage ==
- 1917: Twelfth Night, directed by Jacques Copeau, Garrick Theatre, New York City
- 1918: The Miser, directed by Jacques Copeau, Garrick Theatre, New York City
- 1918: La Surprise de l'amour, directed by Jacques Copeau, Garrick Theatre, New York City
- 1918: L'Amour médecin, directed by Jacques Copeau, Garrick Theatre, New York City
- 1918: The Brothers Karamazov, directed by Jacques Copeau, Garrick Theatre, New York City
- 1918: The Marriage of Figaro, directed by Jacques Copeau, Garrick Theatre, New York City
- 1926: Le Dictateur by Jules Romains, directed by Louis Jouvet, Théâtre des Champs-Élysées
- 1927: Léopold le bien-aimé by Jean Sarment, directed by Louis Jouvet, Théâtre des Champs-Élysées
- 1928: Siegfried, directed by Louis Jouvet, Théâtre des Champs-Élysées
- 1929: Suzanne by Steve Passeur, directed by Louis Jouvet, Théâtre des Champs-Élysées
- 1929: Amphitryon 38 by Jean Giraudoux, directed by Louis Jouvet, Théâtre des Champs-Élysées
- 1931: L'Eau fraîche by Pierre Drieu la Rochelle, directed by Louis Jouvet, Théâtre des Champs-Élysées
- 1931: Une taciturne by Roger Martin du Gard, directed by Louis Jouvet, Théâtre des Champs-Élysées
- 1932: La Margrave d'Alfred Savoir, directed by Louis Jouvet, Théâtre des Champs-Élysées
- 1934: Miss Ba by Rudolph Besier, directed by Lugné-Poe, théâtre des Ambassadeurs
- 1934: The Infernal Machine by Jean Cocteau, directed by Louis Jouvet, Comédie des Champs-Élysées
- 1938: Juliette by Jean Bassan, directed by Paulette Pax, théâtre de l'Œuvre
- 1938: Le Jardin d'Ispahan by Jean-Jacques Bernard, directed by Paulette Pax, théâtre de l'Œuvre
- 1939: Pas d'amis, pas d'ennuis by S. H. Terac, directed by Paulette Pax, théâtre de l'Œuvre
- 1940: L'Insoumise by Pierre Frondaie, théâtre Édouard VII
- 1942: L'Enchanteresse by Maurice Rostand, directed by Paulette Pax, théâtre de l'Œuvre
- 1945: The Madwoman of Chaillot by Jean Giraudoux, directed by Louis Jouvet, théâtre de l'Athénée
- 1947: The Apollo of Bellac by Jean Giraudoux, directed by Louis Jouvet, théâtre de l'Athénée
- 1950: La neige était sale by Frédéric Dard d'après Georges Simenon, directed by Raymond Rouleau, théâtre de l'Œuvre
- 1952: La Dame de trèfle by Gabriel Arout, directed by Michel Vitold, théâtre Saint-Georges
- 1955: Anastasia by Marcelle Maurette, directed by Jean Le Poulain, théâtre Antoine
- 1955: Gaspar Diaz by Dominique Vincent, directed by Claude Régy, théâtre Hébertot
- 1956: Le Miroir by Armand Salacrou, directed by Henri Rollan, théâtre des Ambassadeurs
- 1958: La Dame de trèfle by Gabriel Arout, directed by Michel Vitold, Théâtre du Gymnase Marie Bell
- 1961: Les Papiers d'Aspern by Michael Redgrave, directed by Raymond Rouleau, Théâtre des Mathurins
- 1962: Les femmes aussi ont perdu la guerre by Curzio Malaparte, directed by Raymond Gérôme, théâtre des Mathurins
- 1963: Le Fil rouge by Henry Denker, directed by Raymond Rouleau, Théâtre du Gymnase Marie Bell

== Filmography ==
Year	Title	Role	Notes
1943	Le Corbeau	La provocatrice chez le docteur Germain	Uncredited
1943	Vautrin	Europe	
1945	Les Dames du Bois de Boulogne	Mme. D	
1948	Une grande fille toute simple	Véra	
1950	God Needs Men	Anaïs Le Berre	
1953	Children of Love	La Donnadieu	
1956	Voici le temps des assassins	Gabrielle	
1958	Maigret Sets a Trap	Mme Veuve Adèle Maurin	
1960	Le huitième jour	La mère de Françoise	
1962	Le Crime ne paie pas	Mme Lenormand	(segment "L'affaire Hugues")
1964	Un gosse de la butte	Madame Tournier	
1966	Diamond Safari	La vieille dame sur le banc	
1967	Action Man	Old woman	
1973	Les volets clos	Adélaïde	
