= Breitman =

Breitman is a surname. Notable people with the surname include:

- Alison Breitman, American singer-songwriter
- Claude Breitman, later known as Jean-Claude Deret, (1921–2016), French screenwriter
- George Breitman (1916–1986), American activist and newspaper editor
- Georges Breitman (1920–2014), French track and field athlete
- Michel Breitman (1926–2009), French writer
- Sioma Breitman, Ukrainian-Brazilian Photographer
- Isabelle (Zabou) Breitman (born 1959), French actress and film director
- Richard Breitman (born 1947), American historian
