= Roger Pierre =

French comedian and actor (1923–2010)

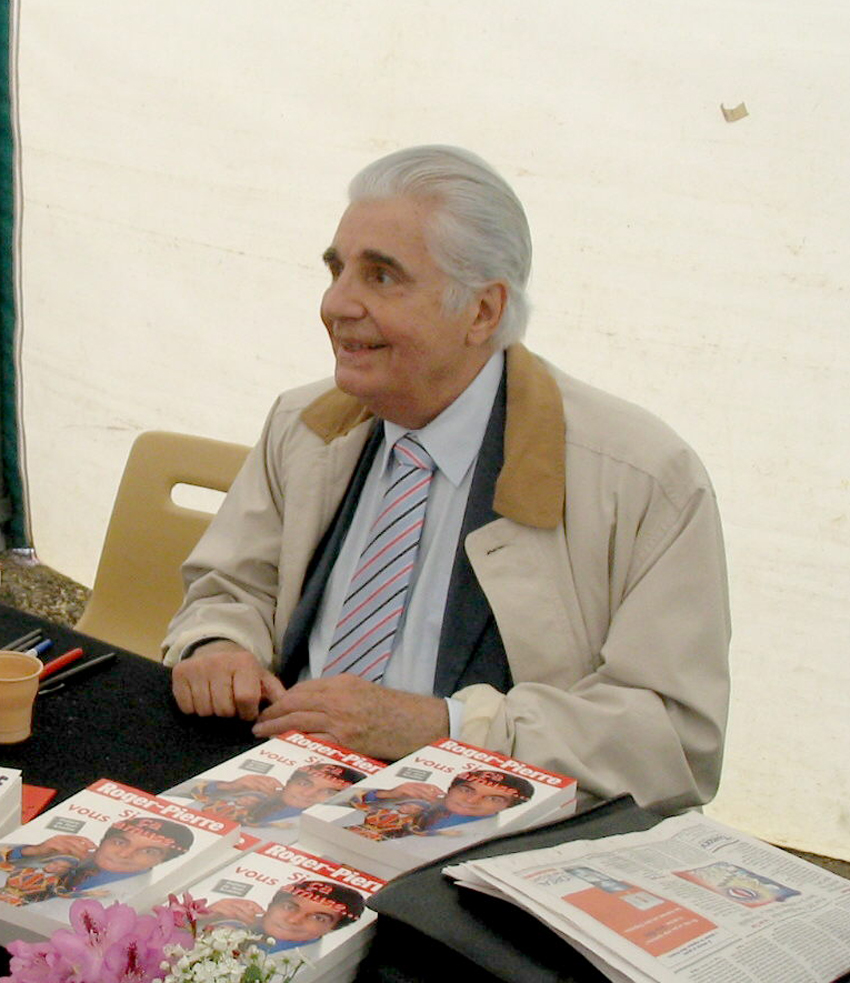
- Roger Pierre in 2006
- Born: 30 August 1923; Paris, France
- Died: 23 January 2010 (aged 86); Le Port-Marly, France
- Occupations: Comedian, actor

Roger Pierre (30 August 1923 – 23 January 2010) was a French comedian and actor.

== Early life ==
Roger Pierre was born on 30 August 1923 in Paris, France.

== Career ==
Pierre and Jean-Marc Thibault were one of France's most popular comedy acts. Working regularly throughout the 1950s, 60s, and 70s, Pierre's first film was 1953's "Belle mentalité (Wonderful Mentality). He appeared in such comedies as Mary Mary (1963), Who Is This Woman? (1967), The Sole Heir (1980), Mr Masure (1987), The Night of Barbizon and The Tureen (2001).

In 1973, Pierre and Thibault starred in the 1973 comedic television series Les Maudits Rois fainéants (The Damned Lazy Kings), which parodied the 1972 TV adaptation of Les Rois maudits.

== Death ==
Pierre died in his native Paris, aged 86, from cancer.

== Partial filmography ==
- 1946: Le Père tranquille - (uncredited)
- 1949: I Like Only You - Un journaliste d'Ici Paris (uncredited)
- 1952: Crazy for Love - Jean Marco, l'imprésario
- 1953: Deux de l'escadrille - Lt. Chardonneret
- 1953: Women of Paris - Himself - Comédien en duo
- 1953: Wonderful Mentality - Frédo
- 1953: Une vie de garçon - Bernard Chapuis
- 1953: His Father's Portrait - Le présentateur (uncredited)
- 1955: M'sieur la Caille - Pépé la Vache
- 1955: Madelon - Le caporal Georges Beauguitte
- 1956: La Bande à papa - Roger
- 1956: La vie est belle - Roger
- 1957: Nous autres à Champignol - Un garde
- 1957: C'est arrivé à 36 chandelles - Himself (uncredited)
- 1958: Vive les vacances - Roger
- 1958: Sans famille - Le clown Bib
- 1959: Les motards - Roger - un grand adolescent, chef d'une bande de motards du dimanche
- 1959: The Gendarme of Champignol - Vittorio - le bandit de la colline aux oiseaux
- 1960: Les héritiers - Roger
- 1960: Love and the Frenchwoman - Prince Charming (segment "Adolescence, L'")
- 1960: Les Tortillards - Gérard Durand
- 1961: La Belle Américaine - Le snob à la Cad' / Snob in Sports Car
- 1962: Un cheval pour deux - Maurice
- 1962: Virginie - Pierre
- 1962: How to Succeed in Love - Marcel
- 1962: Tartarin of Tarascon - Le scout #1
- 1962: We Will Go to Deauville - Mr. Louis
- 1964: Les durs à cuire ou Comment supprimer son prochain sans perdre l'appétit - Germain Lormond
- 1964: Les gros bras - Philippe Bareil
- 1965: Les baratineurs - Philippe, un aubergiste
- 1966: Les malabars sont au parfum - François
- 1969: Faites donc plaisir aux amis - Jean-Louis Brunel
- 1969: Le débutant - Le scénariste
- 1970: Des vacances en or - Alexandre
- 1974: Gross Paris - Bernard
- 1974: En grandes pompes - Marcel
- 1977: Comme sur des roulettes - Himself
- 1980: Mon oncle d'Amérique - Jean Le Gall
- 1981: Camera d'albergo - Tonino Accrocca
- 1983: Le Braconnier de Dieu - M. Martin
- 1998: Bingo - Monsieur Schmitt
- 2005: Olé! - M. Sonnier
- 2009: Wild Grass - Marcel Schwer

== Director and actor ==
- 1956: La Vie est belle - Life is Beautiful Roger
