= Alex Joffé =

French film director and screenwriter (1918–1995)

- Born: 18 November 1918; Alexandria, Egypt
- Died: 18 August 1995 (aged 76); Paris, France
- Occupations: Film director, screenwriter
- Years active: 1946–1986

Alex Joffé (18 November 1918 – 18 August 1995) was a French film director and screenwriter, known for Les cracks (1968), Fortunat (1960) and La grosse caisse (1965). He was the father of the director Arthur Joffé, as well as Marion (born 1952) and Nina (born 1956).

Alex Joffé was born on 18 November 1918 in Alexandria, Egypt, as Alexandre Joffé. He was married to Renée Asseo. on his mother's side, he is related to author and journalist Salomon Malka, the biographer of Emmanuel Lévinas and Franz Rosenzweig, and theatre professor, director and playwright Avraham Oz. He died on 18 August 1995 in Paris.

== Filmography ==
=== Director ===
- 1946 : Six heures à perdre starring André Luguet and Denise Grey
- 1953 : Open Letter starring Robert Lamoureux and Geneviève Page
- 1955 : Les Hussards starring Bourvil, Bernard Blier, Louis de Funès and Georges Wilson
- 1956 : Les Assassins du dimanche starring Barbara Laage, Dominique Wilms and Jean-Marc Thibault
- 1957 : A Bomb for a Dictator starring Pierre Fresnay and Michel Auclair
- 1959 : Du rififi chez les femmes starring Robert Hossein, Roger Hanin and Silvia Monfort
- 1960 : Fortunat starring Bourvil et Michèle Morgan
- 1961 : Le Tracassin ou Les Plaisirs de la ville starring Bourvil and Pierrette Bruno
- 1962 : Les Culottes rouges starring Bourvil and Laurent Terzieff
- 1965 : Pas question le samedi starring Robert Hirsch
- 1965 : La Grosse Caisse starring Bourvil and Paul Meurisse
- 1968 : Les Cracks starring Bourvil, Robert Hirsch and Monique Tarbès

=== Screenwriter ===
- 1943 : Don't Shout It from the Rooftops
- 1944 : Florence est folle
- 1946 : Adieu chérie (released in English as Goodbye Darling)
- 1946 : Tant que je vivrai
- 1946 : Christine se marie
- 1946 : La Fille du diable
- 1946 : L'assassin n'est pas coupable (released in English as The Murderer is Not Guilty)
- 1947 : Six heures à perdre
- 1948 : El supersabio (released in English as The Genius)
- 1949 : El Mago (released in English as Magician)
- 1949 : Millionaires for One Day
- 1950 : Le 84 prend des vacances
- 1950 : Trois Télégrammes
- 1951 : Monte Carlo Baby
- 1951 : ...Sans laisser d'adresse (released in English as Without Leaving an Address)
- 1951 : Alone in Paris
- 1951 : Nous irons à Monte-Carlo (French version of Monte Carlo Baby)
- 1953 : Taxi
- 1953 : Lettre ouverte
- 1953 : Women of Paris
- 1954 : L'Aventurier de Séville
- 1955 : Les Hussards
- 1956 : Les Assassins du dimanche
- 1956 : I'll Get Back to Kandara
- 1957 : Les Fanatiques
- 1959 : Du rififi chez les femmes
- 1960 : Fortunat
- 1961 : Le Tracassin ou Les Plaisirs de la ville
- 1962 : Les Culottes rouges
- 1965 : Pas question le samedi
- 1965 : La Grosse Caisse
- 1968 : Les Cracks

=== Actor ===
- 1957 : Amour de poche (directed by Pierre Kast)
- 1960 : Tirez sur le pianiste (directed by François Truffaut)
- 1986 : Hôtel du Paradis (directed by Jana Boková)
