= Open Letter (film) =

1953 film

- Directed by: Alex Joffé
- Written by: Gabriel Arout; Alex Joffé
- Produced by: Jules Borkon; Pierre Gérin; Michel Lesay; Ray Ventura
- Starring: Robert Lamoureux; Geneviève Page; Jean-Marc Thibault
- Cinematography: Jean Bourgoin
- Edited by: Roger Dwyre
- Music by: Denis Kieffer
- Production companies: Champs-Élysées Productions; Hoche Productions; Les Productions Cinématographiques
- Distributed by: Ciné Sélection
- Release date: 11 March 1953
- Running time: 100 minutes
- Country: France
- Language: French

Open Letter (French: Lettre ouverte) is a 1953 French comedy film directed by Alex Joffé and starring Robert Lamoureux, Geneviève Page and Jean-Marc Thibault. The film's sets were designed by the art director Robert Clavel. Location shooting took place around Paris.

== Synopsis ==
Martial Simonet is very jealous of his wife Colette and when he sees her writing a letter he demands to know who it is to she refuses to tell him. After she has posted it he bribes the postman to allow him to have it, but has so borrow the money from his parents in law. In cahoots with Colette, the postman has actually passed him a fake letter. It is only in the end that Martial becomes assured of his wife's fidelity.

== Cast ==
- Robert Lamoureux as Martial Simonet
- Geneviève Page as Colette Simonet
- Jean-Marc Thibault as Gaston
- Paul Bonifas as Honoré - le beau-père
- Rosy Varte as La concierge - Madame Pépin
- Sophie Mallet as La bonne - Hortense
- Jacques Hilling as Le flic - Monsieur Pépin
- Georges Wilson as Un locataire
- Germaine de France as La vieille locataire - Madame Gallot
- Claude Castaing as Le monsieur galant
- Solange Certain as Henriette
- Pierre Dux as Monsieur Lesage
- Mary Marquet as Laurence - La belle-mère
- Michel Lemoine as Le peintre
- Jean Berton as L'inspecteur
- Geneviève Morel as La grosse dame
- Paul Villé as Le chauffeur

== Bibliography ==
- Bessy, Maurice & Chirat, Raymond. Histoire du cinéma français: 1951-1955. Pygmalion, 1989.
- Rège, Philippe. Encyclopedia of French Film Directors, Volume 1. Scarecrow Press, 2009.
