= Maritie and Gilbert Carpentier =

Artistic producers

Maritie (12 December 1922 – 23 November 2002) and Gilbert (20 March 1920 – 18 September 2000) Carpentier, a married couple, were artistic producers of popular variety TV and radio shows in France and many French-speaking countries from the 1950s to the 1990s.

== Biography ==
=== Family and studies ===
Gilbert Carpentier, born in 1920, was the grandson of the French inventor Jules Carpentier (manufacturer, with the Lumière brothers, of the first cinématographe device) and the French acoustician Gustave Lyon. An alumnus of the Conservatoire de Paris music school, he was a pianist, organist, and composer.

=== Radio ===
Just after World War II, Gilbert Carpentier started working at the French radio station Radio-Luxembourg (which later became RTL) as an organ player, then as a radio technician. From 1946, he began composing musical illustrations, and with the help of his wife Maritie, who wrote the texts, they started producing radio soaps. From the 1950s, Maritie and Gilbert Carpentier directed six popular radio shows on Radio-Luxembourg: "L’heure musicale", "Le Club des Vedettes" (presented by Maurice Biraud), "Musique à la Clay" (presented by Philippe Clay), "Les contes de l’aigle", "L’heure exquise" (presented by Anne-Marie Carrière), and "Le miroir aux Étoiles", hosted every Sunday by a different artist.

=== Music ===
In 1957, they created a series of Babar records for children. Maritie Carpentier adapted the writings of Jean de Brunhoff, while Gilbert Carpentier composed the music. These records were awarded the Grand Prix du Disque in 1957 by the Académie Charles Cros, the French equivalent of the U.S. Recording Academy.

=== TV ===
Maritie and Gilbert Carpentier are best known for being pioneers of variety TV shows in France. From 1960, following a proposal from the French public TV channel ORTF, they began working in television. They first created numerous live TV shows with their friends Roger Pierre and Jean-Marc Thibault, broadcast on the ORTF. Later, other artists joined, including Jean Poiret, Michel Serrault, Jacqueline Maillan, and Jean-Claude Brialy.

In 1965, they asked Serge Gainsbourg to write a song to represent Luxembourg at the Eurovision Song Contest. Gainsbourg wrote Poupée de cire, poupée de son for the young French singer France Gall. The song won the contest and quickly became a global hit.

Until the 1980s, and especially in the 1970s, they created and directed several variety TV shows in France, contributing to the popularity of many French artists in French-speaking countries, including Charles Aznavour, Gilbert Bécaud, Jane Birkin, Georges Brassens, Petula Clark, Dalida, Joe Dassin, Sacha Distel, Jacques Dutronc, Claude François, Serge Gainsbourg, France Gall, Chantal Goya, Johnny Hallyday, Serge Lama, Thierry Le Luron, Mireille Mathieu, Eddy Mitchell, Nana Mouskouri, Michel Sardou, Sheila, Alain Souchon, and Sylvie Vartan, among others.

Maritie and Gilbert Carpentier's TV shows were distinctive for their unexpected artist duets, as well as actors singing and singers acting. Each episode featured newly designed sets and scripted segments, adding to the show's originality. Their shows were often broadcast live and did not include promotional content from artists.

Most of their programs, from their early radio days until the 1980s, were recorded in the renowned Studio 17 at the Buttes-Chaumont Studios in Paris.

Some of their shows, particularly the "Top à..." and "Numéro 1" series, attracted an audience of 15 million viewers each week and were broadcast in 20 French-speaking countries.

Gilbert Carpentier handled the technical aspects and set design, while Maritie Carpentier, sometimes nicknamed "la nounou des artistes" ("the artists' nanny"), managed the artistic aspects.

In 1980, Maritie and Gilbert Carpentier won an Emmy Award for Best Foreign TV Show.

== Produced shows ==
=== Radio ===
- L’heure musicale, broadcast on Radio-Luxembourg
- Le Club des Vedettes, broadcast on Radio-Luxembourg and presented by Maurice Biraud
- Musique à la Clay, broadcast on Radio-Luxembourg and presented by Philippe Clay
- Les contes de l’aigle, broadcast on Radio-Luxembourg
- L’heure exquise, broadcast on Radio-Luxembourg and presented by Anne-Marie Carrière
- Le miroir aux Étoiles, broadcast on Radio-Luxembourg

=== Television ===
- La Grande Farandole (13 episodes aired from 29 November 1961, to 27 May 1970)
- Guitares et copains (28 November 1962, with Sacha Distel)
- Teuf-Teuf (3 October 1963)
- Top à Cassel (14 March 1964)
- Hello Paris (5 December 1964, with Petula Clark, Françoise Hardy, Sylvie Vartan)
- Sacha Show (25 episodes aired from 30 December 1963, to 30 December 1971, hosted by Sacha Distel; the final episode was in color)
- Bécaud (3 April 1965)
- Pirouettes Salvador (19 April 1965)
- La grande lucarne (Three episodes: 31 May 1965, 8 November 1965, 2 April 1966)
- Show Petula Clark (New Year's Eve, 31 December 1965)
- La grande Polka (29 December 1966)
- Les Grands Enfants (16 episodes aired irregularly from 31 December 1966, to 4 November 1970)
- Entre nous (7 October 1967, with Charles Aznavour)
- Nous irons chez Maxim’s (30 December 1967)
- Petula Clark et les inséparables (31 December 1967, first part in Paris, second in London)
- Sur la pointe des pieds (with Jacques Chazot, 20 April 1968, and 12 February 1969)
- Jolie poupée (4 December 1968, musical comedy for Sylvie Vartan with Joe Cocker, Françoise Hardy, Jacques Dutronc, Jean Yanne, Jacques Martin)
- Show Smet (7 May 1969, with Johnny Hallyday)
- La grande Bousculade (2 July 1969)
- Brialy’s Follies (21 November 1969, with Jean-Claude Brialy, Sylvie Vartan, Barbara; their first color show)
- Les Grands Amis (Three episodes: 18 December 1969, 21 January 1970, 14 July 1970, aired on ORTF second channel)
- Sacha Sylvie Show (29 December 1969, musical comedy for Sacha Distel and Sylvie Vartan)
- Deux sur la 2 (16 episodes from 12 October 1970, to 8 February 1971, with Roger Pierre and Jean-Marc Thibault, aired on ORTF second channel in color)
- Tréteaux dans la nuit (Nine monthly episodes from 19 February – 2 December 1971)
- Poiret et Serrault sur la Deux (22 March 1971, with Jean Poiret, Michel Serrault, Dean Martin, Petula Clark)
- Les petites amies de nos grands amis sont nos amies (23 June 1971)
- Show Petula Clark (28 June 1971, with Petula Clark, Sacha Distel, Sylvie Vartan, Françoise Hardy, Jean-Claude Brialy, Colette Brosset, Serge Gainsbourg, Jacques Dutronc, Robert Dhéry, and Frank Owens, aired on ORTF second channel)
- Gilbert (9 October 1971)
- Bécaud (16 October 1971)
- À la 6.4.2. (21 October 1971, color version of Les Grands Amis, single episode)
- Chante avec Gilbert Bécaud à l'Olympia (23 September 1972)
- À la manière 2 (14 episodes with Roger Pierre and Jean-Marc Thibault, aired on ORTF second channel from 30 September 1971, to 29 January 1972)
- Maillan à la une (18 December 1971)
- Top à... (1972–1974, weekly shows aired on the ORTF second channel in color from March 1972 until the breakup of ORTF in late 1974)
- Numéro Un (1975–1982, over 220 weekly episodes aired on TF1)

== Publications ==
- La Maillan racontée par ses amis, Éditions Numéro 1, 1993
- Merci les artistes !, Éditions Anne Carrière, 2001

== Tribute ==
- Maritie et Gilbert Carpentier, a song from the album Reprise des négociations by French singer Bénabar, in tribute to the couple and their famous variety shows.

== Related programs ==
- Top à Maritie et Gilbert Carpentier, aired on TF1 on 9 March 1996, presented by Christophe Dechavanne
- Nos meilleurs moments, aired on TF1 in August 2000, presented by Carole Rousseau
- Nuit du patrimoine spéciale Maritie et Gilbert Carpentier, aired on Paris Première on 19 September 2009
- Chabada special, aired on 5 April 2010, on France 3
- Quand la musique est bonne special Carpentier, aired on TMC on 11 May 2010
- Nous nous sommes tant aimés : Maritie et Gilbert Carpentier, aired on France 3 on 16 and 17 May 2011
- L'Âge d'or des variétés - Les Carpentier, a two-part 120-minute documentary by Grégory Draï and Philippe Tuillier, aired on France 3 on 19 December 2016 (first part rebroadcast on 28 December 2016)
- Les n°1 des Carpentier, a 190-minute documentary by Philippe Tuillier, aired on France 3 on 2 January 2019
