= Varte =

Varte is a surname of a clan under the Hmar (A tribe under the Mizo conglomerate) tribe of Northeast India especially in the states of Mizoram, Manipur and Assam. However, the surname "Varte" is not limited to the Hmar tribe as people with the same surname are also found among the Paite (A tribe under the Zomi conglomerate) tribe with slight variation in pronunciation and spelling where the 'r' is spelt and pronounced as 'l'. Also, the surname appears to be used by some people other than Hmar or Paite tribe. Notable among these people is Rosy Varte (1923–2012), a French actress who was of Armenian descent. The surname may have little or no connection to the Sanskrit "Vartee" or "Varte" which means "Sovereign King".

Some notable personalities with the surname include:

- Mami Varte (born 1988), Indian singer
- Rosy Varte (1923–2012), French actress
