= Rosy Varte =

French actress

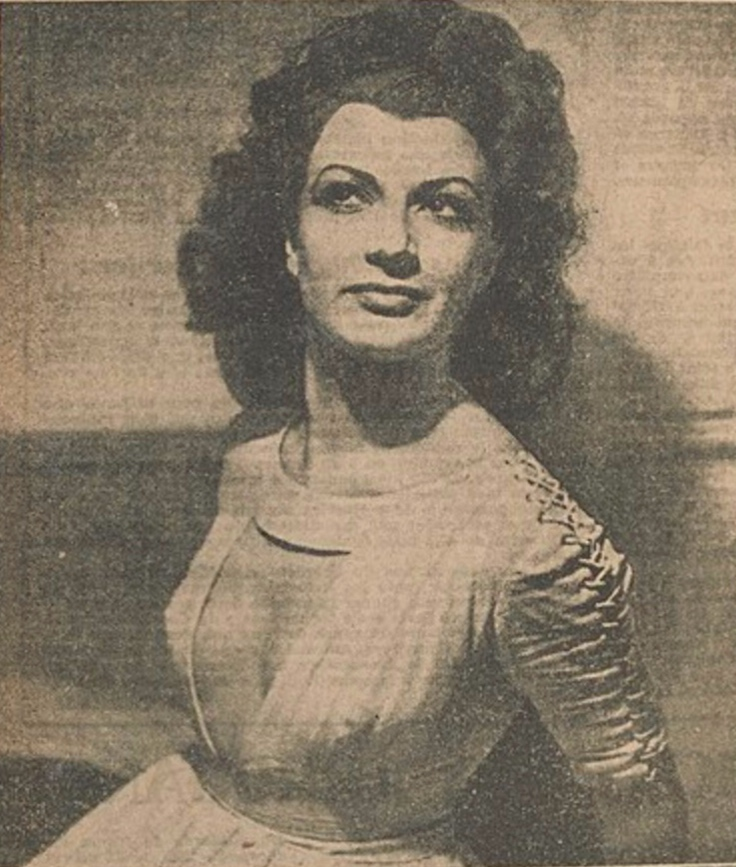
- Rosy Varte in 1946
- Born: Nevarte Manouelian; 22 November 1923; Istanbul, Turkey
- Died: 14 January 2012 (aged 88); Neuilly-sur-Seine, France
- Occupation: Actress
- Years active: 1949-2012
- Spouse: Pierre Badel (19??-2012; her death)

Rosy Varte (22 November 1923 – 14 January 2012) was a French actress of Armenian descent. She made more than 100 film and television appearances during her career.

She starred in the 1972 film The Bar at the Crossing, which was entered into the 22nd Berlin International Film Festival. She was a voice actress in the cartoon Western movies, Daisy Town (1971, as "Lulu Carabine") and La Ballade des Dalton (1978, as "Miss Worthlesspenny").

== Life and career ==
Born Nevarte Manouelian in Istanbul, Turkey, she emigrated to France at an early age. She appeared in comedies. From 1985 to 1993, she had the title role (Maguy Boissier) in 333 episodes of the hit TV series Maguy. In 2007, she won the 7 d'Or award for Best Actress for playing Maguy Boissier.

== Death ==
She died 14 January 2012 at the American Hospital in Neuilly-sur-Seine, aged 88, following a battle with bronchitis, which degenerated into a lung infection, according to her widower, director Pierre Badel.

== Partial filmography ==
- Manon (1949) - Minor Role
- Vendetta in Camargue (1950) - Conchita
- Three Women (1952) - Paméla
- Open Letter (1953) - La concierge - Madame Pépin
- Minuit... Quai de Bercy (1953) - Mme Boulay, l'épicière
- Virgile (1953) - La grande Léa
- Les hommes ne pensent qu'à ça (1954) - Dolorès - la victime du dragueur
- Casse-cou, mademoiselle! (1955) - La collègue
- French Cancan (1955) - Habituée du café (uncredited)
- Gueule d'ange (1955) - Mathilde
- Les Hussards (1955) - Juliette (uncredited)
- Les Assassins du dimanche (1956) - Marie Simonet
- Pardonnez nos offenses (1956)
- En légitime défense (1958) - Rita
- Le petit prof (1959) - Mme. Léa
- The Gigolo (1960) - Marilyn
- Fortunat (1960) - Rosette Falk
- Le Tracassin or Les Plaisirs de la ville (1961) - La patronne
- La Vendetta (1962) - Mme Lauriston
- Love at Twenty (1962) - La mère de Colette (segment "Antoine et Colette")
- Antoine and Colette (1962, Short) - Colette's Mother
- Angélique, Marquise des Anges (1964) - Rosalba Neri (voice)
- Male Companion (1964) - La mère d'Isabelle / Isabelle's Mother
- Marvelous Angelique (1965) - Rosalba Neri (voice)
- Thomas the Impostor (1965) - Madame Valiche
- The Sultans (1966) - Girl in the club
- Trois enfants... dans le désordre (1966) - Mme Duchemin
- Le voyage du père (1966) - La barmaid du bistrot 'La Patrie'
- Salut Berthe! (1968) - Berthe Chautard
- La honte de la famille (1969) - Perrine Hadol
- My Uncle Benjamin (1969) - Bettine Machecourt
- Le pistonné (1970) - Madame Langmann - la mère
- Daisy Town (1971) - Lulu Carabine (voice)
- Le Viager (1972) - Elvire Galipeau
- The Bar at the Crossing (1972) - Maria
- La belle affaire (1973) - Therese
- La grande nouba (1974) - La vicomtesse
- Peur sur la ville (1975) - Germaine Doizon
- La Ballade des Dalton (1978) - Miss Worthlesspenny (voice)
- Love on the Run (1979) - La mère de Colette
- T'inquiète pas, ça se soigne (1980) - Infirmière Rose Carlin
- Le bourgeois gentilhomme (1982) - Madame Jourdain
- Le Braconnier de Dieu (1983) - La première musicienne en voiture
- Rock 'n Torah (1983) - Esther, la mère d'Isaac
- Waiter! (1983) - Gloria
- Happy Easter (1984) - Marlène Chataigneau, la mère de Julie
- Monsieur de Pourceaugnac (1985) - Nérine
- Chère canaille (1992) - Daisy

• Ippatsu kanta-kun (1977) - Kanta Tobase, Shiro Tobase, Kumiko Tobase
