= Action Man (film) =

1967 film by Jean Delannoy

- Directed by: Jean Delannoy
- Written by: Alphonse Boudard
- Produced by: Raymond Danon
- Starring: Jean Gabin; Robert Stack
- Cinematography: Walter Wottitz
- Edited by: Henri Taverna
- Music by: Francis Lai
- Production companies: Les Films Copernic; Fida Cinematografica
- Distributed by: Comacico
- Release date: 31 May 1967 (France)
- Running time: 100 minutes
- Countries: France; Italy
- Language: French

Action Man (French: Le Soleil des voyous, lit. "The Sun of Thieves"; Italian: Il più grande colpo del secolo, lit. "Heist of the Century") is a 1967 French–Italian crime thriller film directed by Jean Delannoy.

The movie screened at the Venice Film Festival.

== Plot ==
Denis Ferrand (Jean Gabin), a retired gangster in his sixties, whiles away his days with his wife Marie-Jeanne on a peaceful countryside estate. He is the owner of the quiet Domino bar, managed by Betty (Margaret Lee), and an inn named La Chaumière.

Ferrand's attention is caught by the Crédit Industriel du Nord bank office across the street from his bar. He keeps a watchful eye on all the comings and goings at the bank, learning the date when a security convoy is due to arrive with the pay for nuclear power plant workers in nearby Farville. Out of boredom and longing for his life of crime, Ferrand works out a plan for a robbery. While he is fine-tuning his idea, he receives an unexpected visit from Jim Beckley (Robert Stack). An old friend of Ferrand's from Saigon, Beckley is seeking refuge from a smuggling gang. Ferrand decides to kill two birds with one stone: provide shelter for Beckley and employ him in his heist plan.

== Cast ==
- Jean Gabin as Denis Ferrand
- Robert Stack as Jim Beckley
- Suzanne Flon as Marie-Jeanne Ferrand
- Margaret Lee as Betty
- Jean Topart as Mr Henri
- Walter Giller as Maurice Labrousse
- Lucienne Bogaert as old woman
- Georges Aminel as Commissaire Leduc
- Albert Michel as Gaston
- Henri Coutet as security guard
- Bernard Musson as Mr Goulette
- Pierre Koulak as Ange Peresi
- Mino Doro as Luigi Savani
- Bob Ingarao as an accomplice
- Carlo Nell as a criminal
