= Cléo from 5 to 7 =

1962 film by Agnès Varda

- Theatrical release poster
- Directed by: Agnès Varda
- Written by: Agnès Varda
- Produced by: Georges de Beauregard; Carlo Ponti
- Starring: Corinne Marchand; Antoine Bourseiller; Dominique Davray; Dorothée Blanck; Michel Legrand
- Cinematography: Jean Rabier; Alain Levent; Paul Bonis
- Edited by: Janine Verneau; Pascale Laverrière
- Music by: Michel Legrand
- Production company: Rome Paris Films
- Distributed by: Athos Films; Ciné-Tamaris
- Release date: 11 April 1962
- Running time: 90 minutes
- Countries: France; Italy
- Language: French

Cléo from 5 to 7 (French: Cléo de 5 à 7) is a 1962 French New Wave drama film written and directed by Agnès Varda. It follows Florence (Corinne Marchand), a young singer known professionally as "Cléo Victoire", from 5 p.m. until 6:30 p.m. on June 21, as she waits to hear the results of a biopsy that will possibly confirm a diagnosis of stomach cancer.

The supporting cast includes Antoine Bourseiller, Dominique Davray, and Dorothée Blanck. Composer Michel Legrand, who wrote the film's score, plays Bob, a composer and pianist. Les fiancés du pont MacDonald, a silent short film directed by Varda that Cléo watches at a theater, features a cast composed of several New Wave figures, among them Jean-Luc Godard, Anna Karina, Eddie Constantine, Sami Frey, and Jean-Claude Brialy.

The film was entered into the 1962 Cannes Film Festival.

== Plot ==
In Paris, singer Cléopâtre "Cléo" Victoire is at a tarot card reading. The fortune teller says there is illness and change in her future, as well as a meeting with a talkative young man, but insists that the Death card just indicates a profound transformation, and not necessarily literal death. When the woman acts as though she cannot read palms after looking at Cléo's hand, however, Cléo becomes distraught, taking the reading as confirmation that the results of her biopsy will come back positive for stomach cancer that evening.

Cléo walks to a café, where her assistant, Angèle, is waiting for her. Angèle fails to calm her down, and she attracts the attention of the owner, who gives her a free coffee after hearing her troubles. The two women go hat shopping, and Cléo buys a black fur hat, despite Angèle telling her that it is unsuitable for summer weather. When Cléo wants to wear the hat out, Angèle reminds her that it is bad luck to wear—or even carry—something new on a Tuesday, so they have the shopkeeper send the hat to Cléo's apartment, and get in a taxi. One of Cléo's songs plays on the radio, and Cléo and Angèle talk with the female driver about the dangers of her job and listen to news coverage of the Algerian War.

At Cléo's flat, Angèle gets her a hot water bottle for her stomach. Cléo's lover, a busy older businessman named José, drops by, and, though he talks lovingly to Cléo, he dismisses her fears when she mentions them and only stays a few minutes. Cléo tells Angèle that she is thinking about breaking up with José, and they discuss men.

Bob, a composer and pianist, and Maurice, a lyricist, arrive to rehearse with Cléo. When Angèle mentions that Cléo is ill, the men try to cheer her up by pretending to be doctors, but only half-succeed. Some lighthearted new songs do lift Cléo's spirits briefly, but a dramatic ballad titled "Sans toi" makes her agitated again. She changes into a black dress, and, saying she wants to be alone, leaves.

Wandering to Le Dôme Café, Cléo plays one of her songs on the jukebox, but no one pays it any attention. She goes to an art studio to visit her old friend Dorothée, who is modelling nude for a class of sculptors. When the class finishes, Cléo goes with Dorothée to pick up a package for her boyfriend Raoul, and they take it to the cinema where he works as a projectionist. Dorothée is worried to hear of Cléo's health concerns, but, though she is sympathetic, she does not have much productive advice.

Raoul invites Cléo and Dorothée to stay for the short film when Dorothée mentions that Cléo is ill, saying that a laugh is good for any illness. From the projection booth, they watch a brief silent comedy in which a man thinks he sees his fiancée die and be taken away in a hearse, only to realise his sunglasses were making things look black, and the scene repeats in a much lighter tone. Leaving the cinema, Dorothée drops her purse and breaks a hand mirror, which Cléo considers a bad omen.

There is a crowd outside Le Dôme, and Cléo and Dorothée learn a man has been killed there. They get in a taxi, and Dorothée tells Cléo that the broken mirror was for the man, not her. Cléo drops Dorothée off at another modelling job, and, as it is a beautiful day, goes to the nearby Parc Montsouris. By the waterfall, Antoine, a gentle soldier on the last day of his leave from the Algerian War who is full of facts, approaches Cléo, telling her that it is the longest day of the year. They bond over their mutual fear of dying, and Antoine encourages Cléo to go to the hospital to get her results in person, rather than call, saying he will accompany her, and she can see him off at the train station afterward. On the way to a bus stop, Cléo tells Antoine that her real name is Florence, which he says he prefers.

Antoine is initially able to distract Cléo with his conversation, but she becomes more pensive as they near the hospital. She is upset when told that her doctor has already left for the day, but calms down as she and Antoine walk in the hospital's garden. They sit on a bench and discuss where they should eat before Antoine's train, when, suddenly, Cléo's doctor drives by and stops. He casually tells Cléo that she will be alright after two months of radiotherapy, and to come see him in the morning. Antoine says he is sorry he has to leave, as he would like to be with Cléo, and she responds that he is with her at this moment, and that she thinks her fear is gone and she is happy. Cléo and Antoine walk on in silence, occasionally glancing at each other, and then stop and stare into each other's eyes.

== Cast ==
- Corinne Marchand as Florence "Cléo" Victoire, a young singer concerned about her health
- Antoine Bourseiller as Antoine, a soldier on leave
- Dominique Davray as Angèle, Cléo's assistant
- Dorothée Blanck as Dorothée, Cléo's friend and an art model
- Michel Legrand as Bob, a composer and pianist
- José Luis de Vilallonga as José, Cléo's lover
- Loye Payen as Madame Irma, a fortune teller
- Renée Duchateau as the hat seller
- Lucienne Marchand as the taxi driver
- Serge Korber as Maurice, a lyricist
- Robert Postec as Dr. Valineau, Cléo's doctor

Uncredited

- Jean Champion as the café owner
- Jean-Pierre Taste as the young man in the café
- Fernande Engler as the young woman in the café
- Raymond Cauchetier as Raoul, Dorothée's boyfriend and a film projectionist

In the silent short film

- Anna Karina as Anna, the blonde woman in white
- Jean-Luc Godard as the man with sunglasses
- Emilienne Caille as the woman in black
- Eddie Constantine as the man with a hose
- Sami Frey as the undertaker
- Danièle Delorme as the flower seller
- Yves Robert as the handkerchief seller
- Alan Scott as the sailor
- Jean-Claude Brialy as the ambulance attendant

Producer Georges de Beauregard appears as the driver of both the hearse and the ambulance in the full version of Les fiancés du pont MacDonald, but the shots in which he appears were among those removed when the silent short was edited for inclusion in Cléo from 5 to 7.

== Critical reception ==
On the review aggregator website Rotten Tomatoes, 93% of 55 critics' reviews of the film are positive, with an average rating of 8.7/10; the site's "critics consensus" reads: "Cléo from 5 to 7 represents a beautifully filmed highlight of the French New Wave that encapsulates the appeal of the era while departing from its narrative conventions." On Metacritic, which uses a weighted average, the film has a score of 87 out of 100 based on 22 reviews, indicating "universal acclaim".

Luke Buckmaster of The Guardian praised the film, writing that the film was a "joyous exercise in elegance and style".

The film first appeared on Sight & Sound magazine's Critics' Poll of the Greatest Films of All Time in 2002, appearing in 289th place. It rose to number 207 in the 2012 Critics' Poll, and reached number 14 in the 2022 Critics' Poll, making it the third-highest ranking film directed by a woman on the list (after Claire Denis' Beau Travail at number 7 and Chantal Akerman's Jeanne Dielman, 23, quai du Commerce, 1080 Bruxelles at number 1).

In 2019, Cléo from 5 to 7 was voted the second-greatest film directed by a woman (behind only Jane Campion's The Piano) in a BBC poll of 368 film experts from 84 countries.
