= Gabriel Béchir =

French set decorator

- Born: 24 October 1927; Toulon, France
- Died: 18 December 2001 (aged 74)
- Other name: Gabriel Bechir
- Occupation: Set decorator
- Years active: 1954 - 1988

Gabriel Béchir (24 October 1927 – 18 December 2001) was a French film set decorator. He was nominated for an Academy Award in the category Best Art Direction for the film The Longest Day.

== Selected filmography ==
- Le Tracassin or Les Plaisirs de la ville (1961)
- The Longest Day (1962)
