= Jean-Louis Roy (director) =

Swiss film director (1938–2020)

- Born: 1938; Geneva, Switzerland
- Died: 29 March 2020 (aged 81–82)
- Occupation: Film director

Jean-Louis Roy (French: [ʒɑ̃ lwi ʁwa]; 1938 – 29 March 2020) was a Swiss film and television director.

== Biography ==
From an early age, Roy frequented the cinemas of Plainpalais in Geneva. At the age of 12, he arranged film screenings with other children in his neighborhood. At the age of 16, Roy was hired by René Schenker to work at Télévision Genevoise, which would become Télévision Suisse Romande (TSR), as a sound producer. Due to the uncertainty for the future of television, Roy simultaneously began a photography apprenticeship.

At TSR, he became cameraman, then a film editor, notably working for Claude Goretta. Goretta taught Roy cinematographic writing, allowing Roy to move to directing in 1963. The following year, he won the Rose d'Or with Happy End, and Roy prided himself in showing that Switzerland's cinematography could compete with that of other nations. This would drive him to shoot a spy film, The Unknown Man of Shandigor in 1967, although the film was seen as not Swiss enough. However, it would still represent Switzerland at the Cannes Film Festival and the Locarno Festival. Roy would then take a break from films to focus on television, but returned to the screen following the success of Michel Soutter's The Moon with Teeth.

Roy benefited from collaboration with his father, Alphonse, in soundtracks for his films. Alphonse Roy was a flutist with the Orchestre de la Suisse Romande, and composed the music for D'un jour à l'autre and The Unknown Man of Shandigor.

Roy collaborated with Groupe 5 to film Black Out in 1970. Groupe 5 sought to increase the prominence of French-speaking Swiss films.

Starting in 1972, Roy focused primarily on making creative documentaries, such as L'Indien des Acacias, La Maison des souvenirs, and Romands d'amour. His subjects were considered to be outside of the social norms of the time, such as trans identity, exorcism, etc. In 2001, he presented Portraits passion, a program that broadcast 20 of his best documentaries. Roy retired in 2006.

== Filmography ==
- Carnaval de Nice (1958)
- Le Roussillon (1958)
- Lumière de fête (1958)
- D'un jour à l'autre (1960)
- La Belle au bois dormant (1962)
- Le futur actuel (1963)
- Opinion (1963)
- Happy End (1964)
- Ndjaick Paul : moi, un noir (1965)
- Cover-girl (1967)
- The Unknown Man of Shandigor (1967)
- C.-F. Landry (1968)
- Le rouge et le noir (1968)
- Maurice Chappaz (1968)
- Moi Bertram (1968)
- Monsieur le Capitaine (1968)
- Suivez les guides (1968)
- Ils étaient 177 (1969)
- L'homme du Tumulus (1969)
- Albert Januarius di Decarli (1970)
- Black Out (1970)
- Douze jeunes en colère (1970)
- Hugues Aufray (1970)
- L'école ouverte au monde (1970)
- Récréations (1970)
- À chances égales (1971)
- Ce jour-là à Sonvillier (1971)
- Hans Jorg Gisiger sculpteur (1971)
- Jean Baier ou L'équilibre géométrique (1971)
- Kosta Alex ou L'homme au chapeau (1971)
- Jean-François Comment ? (1972)
- Le peintre Henri Roulet (1972)
- L'indien des Acacias (1972)
- Peter Knapp vous avez manqué (1972)
- Samuel Burnand, le Messager boiteux (1972)
- Chacun dans ses meubles (1973)
- Gérard Bregnard peintre et sculpteur (1973)
- La Maison des souvenirs (1973)
- Le monde imaginaire d'André Masson (1973)
- Le peintre Leo Andenmatten (1973)
- Leonardo Cremonini ou Les jeux sans règles (1973)
- Les Indiens de la colère (1973)
- Mythologies d'André Masson (1973)
- Raymond Roussel ou Le génie à l'état pur (1973)
- Grand'Maman, c'est New-York (1975)
- Ric-rac rock : mini portrait d'Alfred Hofkunst (1974)
- Viva Verdi (1974)
- La bière ou La guerre des blondes (1975)
- La mode rétro (1975)
- La mort escamotée (1975)
- Naïf, qui est-tu ? (1975)
- Nous irons à Paris (1975)
- Quelque part, quelqu'un (1975)
- Madame Mary Marquet (1976)
- Yves Robert : avant la Guerre des boutons (1976)
- Bons baisers de Majorque (1977)
- Derrière le miroir (1977)
- Max Bill (1977)
- Autopsie d'une pollution (1978)
- Charles Trenet (1978)
- Talou (1978)
- Images souvenir (1981)
- Le boum de la vidéocassette (1982)
- Vidéo gratias (1982)
- Profession : exorciste (1984)
- Romands d'amour (1984)
- Elvis mon amour (1985)
- Faites-moi tourner la tête (1985)
- La danseuse et le petit soldat (1986)
- Sosie (1987)
- Petites annonces pour grand amour (1988)
- Rêve de bistrot (1988)
- Les sorciers dans la ville (1989)
- Monsieur X (1989)
- Thaïlande, paradis d'amour (1990)
- Les Séducteurs (1992)
- Corps dévoilés (1993)
- Le déclic des anges (1993)
- Allo, Colette (1997)
- Énigmes et aventures (1997)
- Lausanne-Hollywood (1997)
- Le Temps des copains (1997)
- Les fous volants (1997)
- Les ondeline (1997)
- Monsieur Réveil-matin (1997)
- Radio buissonnière (1997)
- Radio théâtre (1997)
- J'ai deux amours (1997)
- Jane et Jack Rollan (1998)
- Le dernier micro (1998)
- Le micro d'Émile (1998)
- Micro magique (1998)
- Monsieur Oin-Oin (1998)
- Visiteurs du soir (1998)
- Portraits passions (2001)
