= Les Assassins du dimanche =

- Directed by: Alex Joffé
- Written by: Alex Joffé; Gabriel Arout
- Produced by: Jacqueline Remy
- Starring: Barbara Laage; Dominique Wilms
- Cinematography: Jean Bourgoin
- Edited by: Jean Feyte
- Music by: Denis Kieffer
- Release date: 20 July 1956
- Running time: 110 minutes
- Country: France
- Language: French

Les Assassins du dimanche (transl. The Murderers of Sunday) is a French drama film made in 1956. It is directed by Alex Joffé, written by Alex Joffé and stars Barbara Laage.

== Cast ==
- Barbara Laage : Simone Simonet
- Dominique Wilms : Ginette Garcet
- Jean-Marc Thibault : Robert Simonet
- Paul Frankeur : Lucien Simonet
- Georges Poujouly : Julot
- Paul Préboist
