= Jacques-Paul Bertrand =

French film producer

- Born: 27 April 1930; Boulogne-Billancourt, France
- Died: 24 February 2006 (aged 75); Marseille, Bouches-du-Rhône, France
- Occupation: Producer
- Years active: 1961-1974 (film)

Jacques-Paul Bertrand (1930–2006) was a French film producer. He also directed two films.

== Selected filmography ==
- Dynamite Jack (1961)
- Good King Dagobert (1963)
- Badmen of the West (1964)
- The Double Bed (1965)
- Triple Cross (1966)
- The Sultans (1966)
- Darling Caroline (1968)
- The Servant (1970)

== Bibliography ==
- Murphy, Robert. British Cinema and the Second World War. Bloomsbury Publishing, 2005.
