= Le Crime ne paie pas =

1962 film

- Directed by: Gérard Oury
- Written by: Jean Aurenche; Pierre Boileau; Pierre Bost; Frédéric Dard; Paul Gordeaux; Henri Jeanson; Thomas Narcejac; Gérard Oury; Jacques Sigurd; Jean-Charles Tacchella; René Wheeler
- Produced by: Gilbert Bokanowski
- Starring: Danielle Darrieux; Edwige Feuillère; Annie Girardot
- Cinematography: Christian Matras
- Edited by: Roger Dwyre; Raymond Lamy
- Music by: Georges Delerue
- Production companies: Cosmas; G.E.F. Teledis; Transworld Productions
- Distributed by: Unidex
- Release date: 6 July 1962
- Running time: 159 minutes (Original version); 79 minutes (U.K. version)
- Country: France / Italy
- Language: French

Le Crime ne paie pas (US title: Crime Does Not Pay, UK title: Gentle Art of Murder) is a 1962 French drama portmanteau film directed and partly written by Gérard Oury. It consists of four separate episodes, each with its own cast and writers but sharing common themes of beautiful women, jealousy, revenge and death.

From these dark tales centred on leading actresses, Oury switched to buddy comedies which remain among the most-loved and successful films in the history of French cinema. Louis de Funès, here playing a barman whose English is incomprehensible, starred in them, as did English male leads like David Niven and Terry-Thomas. The writing team of Pierre Boileau and Thomas Narcejac, behind the third episode, had provided the stories for two 1950s masterpieces, Les Diaboliques (1955) and Vertigo (1958).

== Le masque ==
Le masque ("The Mask"), partly written by Jean Aurenche and Pierre Bost.

In Venice in the 1490s, the ageing duchess Lucrezia suspects that her lover Angelo is seeing the younger and more beautiful Francesca. He is arrested by her brother, but escapes and is pursued by swordsmen who run him through. In revenge, Francesca smears poison inside the mask which the duchess places over her face to sleep. The episode ends with a shot of her palace at night and a terrible scream.

- Edwige Feuillère as Dona Lucrezia, the duchess
- Laura Efrikian as Antonella, her maid
- Rina Morelli as Teresa, her companion
- Gino Cervi as Chief of Police, her brother
- Gabriele Ferzetti as Angelo Giraldi, her lover
- Rosanna Schiaffino as Francesca Sabelli, his lover

== L'affaire Hugues ==
L'affaire Hugues ("The Hugues Case"), partly written by Henri Jeanson and René Wheeler.

In Paris in the 1880s, the combative socialist deputy Clovis Hugues has many enemies but is secure in the love of his beautiful wife Jeanne. As a way of getting at him, a plot by Madame Lenormand uses a venal journalist Morin and a young near-prostitute to blacken Jeanne's name. Humiliated by being called in for questioning, on emerging from the interview she sees Morin in the corridor. Taking a handgun from her bag, in front of several witnesses she shoots him dead. At her trial, all twelve of the jurymen vote her innocent.

- Philippe Noiret as Clovis Hugues
- Michèle Morgan as Jeanne, his wife
- Lucienne Bogaert as Madame Lenormand, blackmailer
- Claude Cerval as Morin, blackmailer

== L'affaire Fenayrou ==
L'affaire Fenayrou ("The Fenayrou Case"), partly written by Pierre Boileau and Thomas Narcejac.

In Paris in 1913, Gabrielle is told by her lover Louis that he is getting married for financial reasons but wants to carry on their affair as before. She starts giving her husband Martin a hard time, forcing him to live in the conservatory to avoid her wrath. Then she tells Louis that she has banished the man because of his drunken brutality and he must save her, for which she provides a revolver. When Louis tries to use the revolver on the husband one evening, he finds Gabrielle has emptied it. Martin promptly pulls out his own gun and kills Louis in what the police agree is self-defence. The handsome and unmarried Doctor Mathieu comes round to certify the death and ends up in Gabrielle's bed. He does not leave it, because he and Gabrielle celebrate with a bottle of champagne which Martin had poisoned.

- Annie Girardot as Gabrielle Fenayrou
- Pierre Brasseur as Martin Fenayrou, her husband
- Christian Marquand as Louis Aubert, her lover
- Paul Guers as Doctor Mathieu

== L'homme de l'avenue ==
L'homme de l'avenue ("The Man on the Avenue"), partly written by Frédéric Dard.

On an avenue in Paris one evening in 1961, Philippe Marsais throws himself in front of a slow-moving car. The driver Roberts, an English army officer, reports the man's death at a police station and volunteers to break the news to his wife. She is not in, but he traces her to a bar where the attractive woman is on her own and far gone. He takes her home but, as she is incapable of serious talk, leaves her comfortable on the sofa. Outside, he sees a young woman drive off in the dead man's car and follows it. She goes to a hospital to ask if Philippe has been brought in. He tells her the man is dead in the morgue and asks her why she thought he was injured in hospital. It emerges that she is Philippe's lover and his plan was not to die but to be knocked down and taken to that hospital, which would gave him an alibi. While he was there, his wife would put the ice cubes he had poisoned into her whisky. Rushing to the wife's flat, Roberts finds both ice tray and the sofa empty. On storming into the bedroom, he finds her in bed with all the ice cubes in a bag on her aching head.

- Raymond Loyer as Philippe Marsais
- Danielle Darrieux as Lucienne Marsais, his wife
- Perrette Pradier as Hélène, his lover
- Richard Todd as Major William Roberts
- Louis de Funès as the barman

== Production ==
Todd called it "an intriguing little story and I particularly enjoyed working with Danielle Darrieux."
