= Women of Paris =

1953 film

- Directed by: Jean Boyer
- Written by: Jean Boyer; Alex Joffé; Jean Marsan; Ray Ventura
- Produced by: Ray Ventura
- Starring: Michel Simon; Brigitte Auber; Henri Génès
- Cinematography: Charles Suin
- Edited by: Fanchette Mazin
- Music by: Paul Misraki; José Padilla
- Production company: Hoche Productions
- Distributed by: Hoche Productions
- Release date: 2 December 1953
- Running time: 85 minutes
- Country: France
- Language: French

Women of Paris (French: Femmes de Paris) is a 1953 French comedy drama film directed by Jean Boyer and starring Michel Simon, Brigitte Auber and Henri Génès.

== Cast ==
- Michel Simon as Professeur Charles Buisson
- Brigitte Auber as Gisèle
- Henri Génès as Lucien Mosca
- Germaine Kerjean as Mme. Rédéri
- Robert Lombard as Maurice
- Philippe Mareuil as Pierre-Dominique, dit 'Pépé'
- Georges Galley as Patrice
- Suzanne Norbert as Mme. Buisson
- Gaby Basset as Henriette
- Micheline Dax as La snob
- Anne Campion (fr) as La trafiquante
- Leila Lampi as Une danseuse
- Janine Clairville
- Nadine Tallier as Poupette
- Annick Tanguy
- Liane Morice
- Nikitine
- Liliane Montevecchi
- Jacky Lemoine
- Gisèle Fréry
- Nicole Rimbaud
- Janine Caire
- Bernard La Jarrige as Inspecteur Corbin
- Robert Lamoureux as himself
- Patachou as herself
- Ray Ventura as himself
- Jean-Marc Thibault
- Roger Pierre
- Les Quat'Jeudi
- Jacques Grello as (voice)
- Françoise Alban as Petit rôle
- Jack Ary as Le cow-boy
- Danièle Delorme as Elle-même
- Sophie Desmarets as Elle-même
- Sacha Distel as Un musicien
- Pierre Duncan as Un policier
- Bob Ingarao as Arsène l'édenté
- Dominique Marcas
- Michel Seldow
- Henri Serre as Un client du night club

== Bibliography ==
- Myriam Tsikounas. Imaginaires urbains du Paris romantique à nos jours. Editions Le Manuscrit, 2011.
