= Deadlier Than the Male (1956 film) =

Voici le temps des assassins
- Directed by: Julien Duvivier
- Screenplay by: Julien Duvivier; Charles Dorat; Pierre-Aristide Bréal
- Based on: a story by Julien Duvivier; Charles Dorat; Maurice Bessy
- Produced by: René Bezard; Raymond Borderie; Pierre Cabaud
- Starring: Jean Gabin; Danièle Delorme
- Cinematography: Armand Thirard
- Edited by: Marthe Poncin
- Music by: Jean Wiener
- Release date: 13 April 1956
- Running time: 113 minutes
- Country: France
- Language: French

Voici le temps des assassins (French, 'This is the time for murderers') is a 1956 French crime film directed by Julien Duvivier and starring Jean Gabin and Danièle Delorme. The title is a line of Matinée d'ivresse - part of Illuminations by Arthur Rimbaud. The film was released as Deadlier Than the Male in the United States and as Twelve Hours to Live in the UK. It is a dark tale of a young and pretty femme fatale who ruins the life of a man and kills his best friend.

== Plot ==
In Les Halles, in the heart of Paris, the long-divorced André Chatelin, an honest and respected man who runs a successful restaurant, is visited by an unknown young woman. She says she is Catherine, the daughter of his ex-wife Gabrielle, who has died leaving her homeless and penniless. André gives her a room and a job, but she soon starts abusing his kindness. She sows discord between André and his young friend Gérard, a medical student who is like a son to him. And she starts stealing money to support her mother, who is not dead but an ex-prostitute who is now a hopeless drug addict in a sordid hotel.

Catherine seduces and manipulates André into marrying her. As his heir she would be rich and free, so the next plan of her and her mother is to get rid of André. Because of Gérard's medical knowledge and falling out with André, she decides to use the young man as her pawn and quickly seduces him. When he refuses to kill André, however, she put him to sleep with the anesthetic she had prepared for André and then pushes his car into the river with him and his dog César. A grieving André identifies the body, leaving his telephone number with the police, who ring him to ask if he knows the woman seen in Gérard's car. From the description, it is obvious to him that it was Catherine. When he confronts her, she runs off to her mother's hotel. The dog César, who escaped drowning, follows her there and kills her.

== Cast ==
- Jean Gabin as André Chatelin
- Danièle Delorme as Catherine
- Robert Arnoux as Bouvier
- Liliane Bert as Antoinette
- Gérard Blain as Gérard Delacroix
- Lucienne Bogaert as Gabrielle
