= The Pyramid of the Sun God =

1965 film directed by Robert Siodmak

- Directed by: Robert Siodmak
- Written by: Karl May (novel); Ladislas Fodor; Georg Marischka; Robert A. Stemmle
- Produced by: Artur Brauner; Götz Dieter Wulf
- Starring: Lex Barker; Gérard Barray; Michèle Girardon
- Cinematography: Siegfried Hold
- Edited by: Walter Wischniewsky
- Music by: Erwin Halletz
- Production companies: CCC Film; Avala Film; Franco London Films
- Distributed by: Gloria Film
- Release date: 17 April 1965
- Running time: 102 minutes
- Countries: France; Italy; West Germany; Yugoslavia
- Language: German

The Pyramid of the Sun God (German: Die Pyramide des Sonnengottes) is a 1965 West German and Italian western film adventure directed by Robert Siodmak and starring Lex Barker, Gérard Barray and Michèle Girardon. It is based on a book by Karl May, and was part of a boom of Karl May adaptations during the decade. It follows on from The Treasure of the Aztecs (1965), also directed by Siodmak and featuring substantially the same cast.

It was shot at the Spandau Studios in Berlin. The film's sets were designed by the art directors Veljko Despotovic and Hertha Hareiter and Otto Pischinger.

== Cast ==
- Lex Barker as Dr. Karl Sternau
- Michèle Girardon as Josefa Cortejo
- Gérard Barray as Count Alfonso di Rodriganda y Sevilla
- Hans Nielsen as Don Pedro Arbellez
- Rik Battaglia as Captain Lazaro Verdoja
- Gustavo Rojo as Lieutenant Potoca
- Theresa Lorca as Karja
- Ralf Wolter as Andreas Hasenpfeffer
- Kelo Henderson as Frank Wilson
- Alessandra Panaro as Rosita Arbellez
- Jean-Roger Caussimon as Marshall Bazaine
- Antun Nalis as Pablo Cortejo
- Vladimir Popovic as Black Deer
- Branimir Tori Jankovic as Panteo
- Nada Radovic as Big India

== See also ==
- The Treasure of the Aztecs (1965)
- Karl May films

== Bibliography ==
- Bergfelder, Tim. International Adventures: German Popular Cinema and European Co-Productions in the 1960s. Berghahn Books, 2005.
