= The Unknown Man of Shandigor =

1967 film

- Directed by: Jean-Louis Roy
- Written by: Gabriel Arout
- Starring: Daniel Emilfork; Howard Vernon; Serge Gainsbourg; Jacques Dufilho; Ben Carruthers; Marie-France Boyer
- Cinematography: Roger Bimpage
- Music by: Alphonse Roy
- Production company: Frajea Film
- Release date: 1967
- Running time: 90 minutes
- Country: Switzerland
- Language: French

The Unknown Man of Shandigor (French: L'Inconnu de Shandigor) is a 1967 Swiss film directed by Jean-Louis Roy and written by Gabriel Arout. Set around rival efforts to obtain a device capable of neutralising nuclear forces, it was screened in competition at the 1967 Cannes Film Festival and was later shown at festivals including Locarno and the Lumière Film Festival.

== Synopsis ==
Three rival groups, the Soviets, the Americans, and the “Bald Heads”, seek to obtain the Canceler, a machine developed by the scientist Herbert von Krantz that can neutralise nuclear forces.

== Cast ==
The cast includes:

- Daniel Emilfork as Herbert von Krantz
- Marie-France Boyer as Sylvaine, le Bonheur
- Ben Carruthers as Manuel, Shadow
- Howard Vernon as Alphaville
- Jacques Dufilho as Schostacovitch, spy

== Reception ==
Glenn Kenny of The New York Times described the film as “a sci-fi fable of the nuclear anxiety age”. Filmdienst wrote that it parodies spy-film clichés in a mode of fantastic realism and praised its imagery, while noting an occasionally superficial emphasis on style. Eye for Film wrote that the film “is such a handsomely shot, gloriously stylised piece of work that it can stand alongside the best of the genre proper”. Filmo described it as a brilliantly crafted work that blends humour and tragedy and still feels very modern.

== Festival screenings ==
The film was screened in competition at the 1967 Cannes Film Festival and was also shown at the Locarno Film Festival and Solothurner Filmtage that year. Among its later festival screenings were the 10th Neuchâtel International Fantastic Film Festival in 2010, the 69th Locarno Film Festival in 2016, and the Lumière Film Festival in Lyon in 2021, where a restored version was presented by Cinémathèque suisse.
