= Corinne Marchand =

French actress and singer (born 1931)

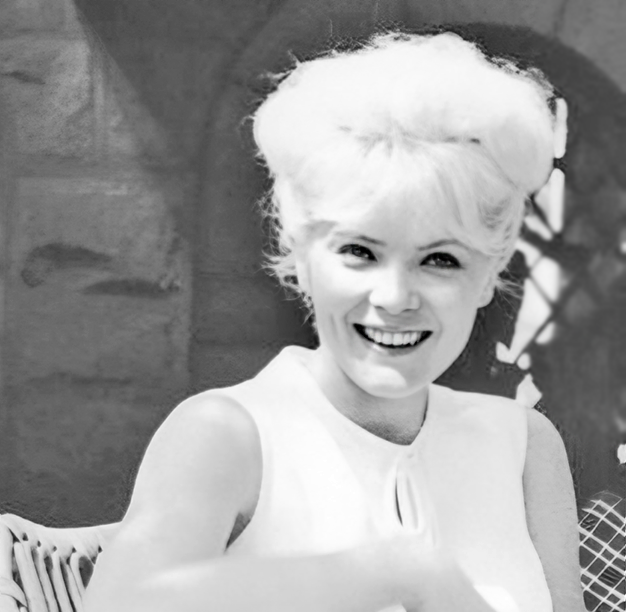
- Marchand in Venice, 1962
- Born: 4 December 1931 (age 94); Paris, France
- Occupation: Actress
- Years active: 1954–2017

Corinne Marchand (French pronunciation: [kɔʁin maʁʃɑ̃]; born 4 December 1931) is a French actress and singer. She is best known for playing the pop singer Cléo Victoire in Cléo from 5 to 7.

== Selected filmography ==
Film
Year	Title	Director	Role	Notes
2017	La Mélodie	Rachid Hami	Simon's mother	
2004	Innocence	Lucile Hadzihalilovic	The principal	
1997	Les Palmes de Monsieur Schutz	Claude Pinoteau	Madame Schutz	
1988	Le Client	Marc Serhan	Clara	
1986	Attention bandits!	Claude Lelouch	Manuchka	
1979	Coup de tête	Jean-Jacques Annaud	Madame Sivardière	
1975	L'amour aux trousses	Jean-Marie Pallardy	Agnes	aka Hot Acts of Love
1972	Travels with My Aunt	George Cukor	Louise	
1972	Liza	Marco Ferreri	Georgio's wife	
1970	Rider on the Rain	René Clément	Tania	
1970	Borsalino	Jacques Deray	Madame Rinaldi	
1966	Arizona Colt	Michele Lupo	Jane	
1966	The Sultans	Jean Delannoy	Mireille	
1965	The Hour of Truth	Henri Calef	Dahlia	
1963	Nunca pasa nada	Juan Antonio Bardem	Jacqueline	
1962	Cléo from 5 to 7	Agnès Varda	Cléo Victoire	Title character
1962	Liberté I	Yves Ciampi	Anne	
1961	Lola	Jacques Demy	Daisy	

== Awards ==
- Prix Suzanne Bianchetti (1962)
