= Death in the Garden =

La mort en ce jardin Death in the Garden
- La mort en ce jardin Spanish poster
- Directed by: Luis Buñuel
- Written by: Luis Alcoriza; Luis Buñuel; Gabriel Arout
- Produced by: Óscar Dancigers; David Mage
- Starring: Simone Signoret; Charles Vanel; Georges Marchal; Michel Piccoli; Michèle Girardon
- Music by: Paul Misraki
- Production companies: Producciones Tepeyac; Films Dismage
- Distributed by: Cinédis (France); Películas Nacionales (Mexico)
- Release dates: 21 September 1956 (France); 9 June 1960 (Mexico)
- Running time: 105 minutes
- Countries: France; Mexico
- Languages: French; Spanish
- Budget: $600,000

La mort en ce jardin ("Death in the Garden") a.k.a. Diamond Hunters is a 1956 adventure film by director Luis Buñuel, based on a novel by José-André Lacour, that stars Simone Signoret, Charles Vanel and Michel Piccoli, with additional dialogue by Raymond Queneau. Set in an unidentified South American country, it recounts the bloody suppression by the corrupt governing regime of an insurrection by illegal diamond miners, after which five disparate fugitives take to the jungle in search of safety.

== Plot ==
When a settlement of illegal diamond miners is broken up by soldiers, in revenge they attack and burn down the army headquarters in the nearest town. Next day, when reinforcements arrive, most of the surviving miners are rounded up to be shot. On a river boat, five people escape the carnage: a pacifist miner, his deaf-mute daughter, the local madame he wants to marry, a Catholic priest, and a wanted adventurer. When pursued by the army, they take to the jungle. There, the struggle for survival starts eroding their identities and in most cases their will to live. The adventurer becomes the resourceful leader, while the miner goes out of his mind and kills both the madame and the priest. After killing the miner, only the adventurer and the girl are left to find freedom together.

== Cast ==
- Simone Signoret as Djin, the madame
- Charles Vanel as Castin, the miner
- Georges Marchal as Shark, the adventurer
- Michel Piccoli as Father Lizardi, the priest
- Michèle Girardon as María Castin, the deaf-mute
- Tito Junco as Chenko
- Raúl Ramírez as Álvaro (as Raul Ramirez)
- Luis Aceves Castañeda as Alberto (as Luis-Aceves Castañeda)
- Jorge Martínez de Hoyos as Captain Ferrero (as Jorge Martinez de Hoyos)
- Alberto Pedret as Second Lieutenant Jiménez
- Marc Lambert as Miner
- Stefani as Miner

== Analysis ==
Death in the Garden proposes a sort of psychological mirror-image of Franco's Spain from which Buñuel exiled himself, with rebellions and oppressors galore.

== Reception ==
On review aggregator website Rotten Tomatoes, Diamond Hunters has an approval rating of 92% based on 13 reviews, with an average score of 7.8/10.

Vincent Canby of The New York Times wrote: "Death in the Garden is a kind of halfway house for the film genius, made when he had yet to receive the acclaim that would give him full control of his movies, but after he had been taken seriously enough by the money men."
