= Hal Hopper =

American singer-songwriter

- Hal Hopper in Mudhoney 1965
- Born: Harold Stevens Hopper; November 11, 1912; Oklahoma City, Oklahoma, U.S.
- Died: November 2, 1970 (aged 57); Sylmar, California, U.S.
- Relatives: Jay North (nephew)

Harold Stevens Hopper (November 11, 1912 – November 2, 1970) was an American singer/songwriter, film score composer and screenwriter.

== Biography ==
Hopper was a member of The Pied Pipers singing group. He composed the themes tune to several television series such as Judge Roy Bean, Colt .45, 26 Men, Circus Boy and Bearcats!

He guest starred on the CBS sitcom, Dennis the Menace, starring Jay North in the title role. Hopper's wife Marie was North's maternal aunt. North later claimed that Marie Hopper physically abused him on the set to ensure the standards of his performance.

Hopper co-authored the script for the 1968 film Shalako, starring Sean Connery.
