= Vladimir Popović (actor) =

- Born: 17 August 1935; Yugoslavia
- Died: 12 May 1981 (aged 45); Yugoslavia
- Occupation: Actor
- Years active: 1957-1981

Vladimir Popović (17 August 1935 – 12 May 1981) was a famous Yugoslavian actor. He was also credited as Vlada Popović and Vlado Popović.

== Filmography ==
- Subotom uvece (1957)
- Licem u lice (1963) .... Radovan
- Mars na Drinu (1964) .... Porucnik Miloje
- Inspektor (1965)
- The Treasure of the Aztecs (1965)
- The Pyramid of the Sun God (1965) .... Black Deer
- Njen prvi caj (1966) (TV)
- Arsenik i stare cipke (1967) (TV) .... Johnatan
- Koktel (1967) (TV)
- Simon (1967) (TV)
- Pozicioni rat ljubavnih generala (1967) (TV)
- Quo vadis Zivorade (1968)
- Sile (1968) (TV)
- Kreitserova sonata (1969) (TV)
- Sramno leto (1969)
- Svi dani u jednom (1969)
- Cudešan svet Horasa Forda (1969) (TV)
- Slucaj Openhajmer (1970) (TV) .... Lord Harrison
- "Deset zapovesti" (1970) TV Series .... Sneškin verenik
- "Rodaci" .... Prvi rodjak (2 episodes, 1970)
  - Hocu da se ženim (1970) TV Episode .... Prvi rodak
  - Rodaci na sve strane (1970) TV Episode .... Prvi rodak
- Sudenje Floberu (1971) (TV)
- Sve ce to narod pozlatiti (1971) (TV)
- Don Kihot i Sanco Pansa (1971) (TV) .... Don Kihot
- Nirnberski epilog (1971) (TV)
- Paljenje rajhstaga (1972) (TV)
- Sarajevski atentat (1972) (TV)
- Naperekor vesmu (1972) .... Bischof Peter I.
- Strah (1972)
- Siroti Mali hrcki (1973) (TV) .... Predsednik vlade
- Svadba(1973)
- Battle of Sutjeska (1973)
- Ping bez ponga (1974) (TV)
- Okovani soferi (1975)
- Naviko (1975)
- Permission to Kill (1975) .... Kostas
- Devojacki most (1976) .... Relja
- Povratak otpisanih (1976)
- Vagon Li (1976) .... Brana Mitic
- Prvi garnizon (1976)
- Povratak otpisanih" (1 episode, 1978).... Uca
- Covjek koga treba ubiti (1979)
