= The Sultans (film) =

1966 film

Les Sultans
- Directed by: Jean Delannoy
- Based on: novel by Christine de Rivoyre
- Produced by: Jacques-Paul Bertrand
- Starring: Gina Lollobrigida
- Cinematography: Tonino Delli Colli
- Music by: Georges Garvarentz
- Release date: 1966
- Countries: France; Italy
- Language: French
- Box office: $3.1 million

The Sultans (French: Les Sultans, Italian: L'amante italiana) is a 1966 French-Italian drama film directed by Jean Delannoy.

== Cast ==
- Gina Lollobrigida : Lisa Bortoli
- Louis Jourdan : Laurent Messager
- Corinne Marchand : Mireille
- Daniel Gélin : Léo
- Philippe Noiret : Michel dit « Michou »
- Muriel Baptiste : Kim Messager
- Renée Faure : Odette Messager
- Rosy Varte : Delphine
- Claude Gensac : Marcelle
- Lucia Modugno : Maguy
