= Le Tracassin =

Le Tracassin ou Les Plaisirs de la ville
- Directed by: Alex Joffé
- Written by: Jean-Bernard Luc; Alex Joffé
- Produced by: Pierre Cabaud; René Bézard
- Starring: Bourvil
- Cinematography: Marc Fossard
- Edited by: Eric Pluet
- Music by: Georges Van Parys
- Distributed by: Pathé Consortium Cinéma
- Release date: 1961
- Running time: 103 minutes
- Country: France
- Language: French

Le Tracassin ou Les Plaisirs de la ville is a French comedy film directed by Alex Joffé, released in 1961.

== Plot ==
The stress of urban living, his sister's new baby and problems with his desire to move in with his girlfriend, the beautiful Juliette, push André to take too many euphoric pills made in the laboratory where he is employed.

== Production ==
- Direction: Alex Joffé, assisted by D. Mage, F. Boucher, B. Chesnais
- Screenplay and adaptation: Jean Bernard-Luc, Alex Joffé
- Script: Jean Bernard-Luc
- Photography: Marc Fossard; Paul Rodier and Serge Rapoutet (operators)
- Sound: René Sarazin
- Editing: Eric Pluet
- Music: Georges Van Parys (éditions Manèges)
- Song: Puisqu'on s'aime, lyrics by Bernard Dimey (éditions Pathé Marconi)
- Scenery: Rino Mondellini; Gabriel Béchir
- Make up: Janine Jarreau
- Hair: Henry Prévost
- Production: Pierre Cabaud, René Bézard
- Production company: Les Films Raoul Ploquin, Pathé Cinéma
- Distribution company: Consortium Pathé
- Format: Black and white - 35 mm - 1,37:1 - Monoaural sound (recorded by Poste Parisien
- Principal photography: Studios « Franstudio »
- Prints: Laboratoire G.T.C de Joinville
- Genre: Comedy
- Length: 103 minutes
- Premier: 20 December 1961

== Cast ==
- Bourvil: André Loriot, laboratory worker
- Pierrette Bruno: Juliette, André's mistress
- Maria Pacôme: Madame Gonzalès, the doctor's mistress
- Rosy Varte: restaurant patroness
- Micheline Luccioni: Jeannette, waitress on the restaurant
- Mireille Perrey: The boss of the Babylis shop
- Yvonne Clech: Music teacher
- Dominique Davray: Loriot's concierge
- Françoise Deldick: A walker
- Léo Campion: Monsieur Van Hooten
- Armand Mestral: Doctor Clairac, boss of André and Juliette
- Jean-Paul Coquelin: A policeman
- Harry-Max: Monsieur Crollebois, the locksmith
- Charpini: The hairdresser
- Mario David: Sports coach
- Teddy Bilis: The client at table 8
- Lucien Guervil: Another policeman
- Jean-Marie Proslier: The neighbour (role cut in editing)
- Étienne Bierry: The policeman in front of the foreign embassy
- Maurice Garrel: A traffic policeman
- Pierre Repp: The strawberry lover at the restaurant
- Antoinette Moya: The laboratory receptionist
- Alice Sapritch: A woman in the queue at the bank
- Jacqueline Jefford: A shop assistant at Babylis
- Diane Wilkinson: The Englishwoman in labour
- Nicole Chollet: A nurse at the clinic
- Monique Messine: The florist
- Jean-Pierre Rambal: A man at the bank, in the restaurant, in the lift...
- Albert Michel: A man at the clinic
- Grégoire Gromoff: Another 2CV owner
- Christian Marin: A cashier at the bank
- Max Desrau: The man stained at the restaurant
- Paul Mercey: The man in the phone booth
- Fulbert Janin: The postman
- Gaston Ouvrard: A man in the queue at the bank
- Jean Rupert: Auguste, the restaurant chef
- Jimmy Perrys: A man on a bicycle
- Francis Lax: Bus conductor
- Henri Poirier: The gendarme who speaks
- Tony Villemin: The employer at the jewellers
- Chantal Deberg
- Lucie Arnold
- Solange Certain
- Pierre Mirat

== About the film ==
- The rarely used word "tracassin" was reactivated by Charles de Gaulle in a speech on 2 October 1961.

== Awards ==
- The 1961 Prix Courteline was awarded to Bourvil for his interpretation of the "tracassé" (the bothered).
