= The Treasure of the Aztecs =

1965 film directed by Robert Siodmak

- Directed by: Robert Siodmak
- Written by: Karl May (novel); Ladislas Fodor; Robert A. Stemmle; Georg Marischka
- Produced by: Artur Brauner; Götz Dieter Wulf
- Starring: Lex Barker; Gérard Barray; Michèle Girardon
- Cinematography: Siegfried Hold
- Edited by: Walter Wischniewsky
- Music by: Erwin Halletz
- Production companies: CCC Film; Avala Film; Franco London Films
- Distributed by: Gloria Film
- Release date: 4 March 1965
- Running time: 101 minutes
- Countries: West Germany; France; Italy
- Language: German

The Treasure of the Aztecs (German: Der Schatz der Azteken) is a 1965 western adventure film directed by Robert Siodmak and starring Lex Barker, Gérard Barray and Michèle Girardon. It was made as a co-production between France, Italy and West Germany. It was based on a novel by Karl May, part of a boom in adaptations of the author's works during the decade. It was followed by a second part The Pyramid of the Sun God (1965).

It was shot at the Spandau Studios in Berlin and on location in Barcelona and Yugoslavia. The film sets were designed by the art directors Hertha Hareiter and Otto Pischinger. It was made in Eastmancolor.

== Cast ==
- Lex Barker as Dr. Karl Sternau
- Gérard Barray as Count Alfonso di Rodriganda y Sevilla
- Rik Battaglia as Captain Lazaro Verdoja
- Michèle Girardon as Josefa Cortejo
- Alessandra Panaro as Rosita Arbellez
- Theresa Lorca as Karja
- Ralf Wolter as Andreas Hasenpfeffer
- Fausto Tozzi as Benito Juarez
- Hans Nielsen as Don Pedro Arbellez
- Gustavo Rojo as Lieutenant Potoca
- Kelo Henderson as Frank Wilson
- Jean-Roger Caussimon as Marshal Bazaine
- Friedrich von Ledebur as Count Fernando di Rodriganda y Sevilla
- Vladimir Popovic as Black Deer
- Jeff Corey as Abraham Lincoln
- Djordje Nenadovic as Count Embarez

== See also ==
- The Pyramid of the Sun God (1965)
- Karl May movies

== Bibliography ==
- Bergfelder, Tim. International Adventures: German Popular Cinema and European Co-Productions in the 1960s. Berghahn Books, 2005.
