= Gérard Barray =

French actor (1931–2024)

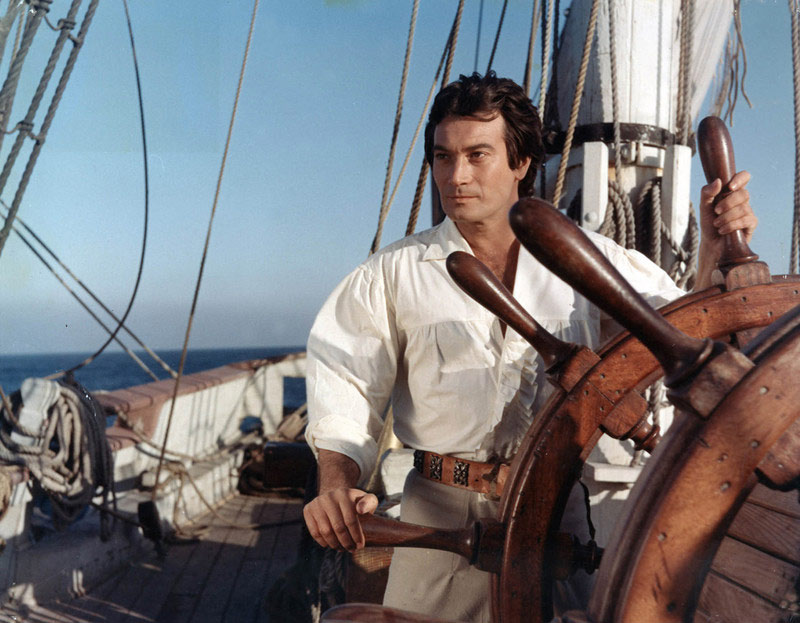
- Gérard Barray in The Sea Pirate (1966)
- Born: 2 November 1931; Toulouse, France
- Died: 15 February 2024 (aged 92); Marbella, Spain
- Occupation: Actor
- Notable work: Open Your Eyes

Gérard Barray (2 November 1931 – 15 February 2024) was a French actor.

== Early life and education ==
Gérard Barray was born in Toulouse on 2 November 1931. His parents split up quickly and his mother, who came from Montauban, decided to return to her hometown with her little boy. Around the age of 15, he discovered a passion for jazz; he participated in a few shows in nightclubs while pursuing his studies and obtained a bachelor's degree at the Faculty of Toulouse. Camille Ricard, an actress and teacher at the Conservatory of Toulouse, who advised him to go to Paris with a letter of recommendation for a friend, Noël Roquevert. Barray enrolled at the Cours Simon, a drama school in Paris. Four years later, Gérard Barray won the Jury Prize.

== Career ==
It will then excel in the roles of knights with a big heart. He starred as D'Artagnan, Pardaillan, Surcouf and Scaramouche. In total he appeared in a dozen feature films of that genre, most of which were box-office successes, widely known abroad. Besides films swashbuckling as Pardaillan and Scaramouche and adventure films like Surcouf, Barray turned police commissioner in two San Antonio movies. In 1969, he starred beside young actress Claude Jade in Le Témoin. He played Van Britten, a mysterious museum curator who seduces a young English teacher. It was his last major role.

For Claude Berri he played in Le Cinéma de papa (1970) as Richard, a super star and rather temperamental actor. His comeback in 1997 was in Alejandro Amenábar's Abre los ojos as Devernois, a TV man.

== Later life and death ==
Gérard Barray was appointed an Officer in the Order of Arts and Letters in January 2010. He died in Marbella, Spain, on 15 February 2024, at the age of 92.

== Selected filmography ==
Year	Title	Role	Director
1961	Captain Fracasse	the Duke of Vallombreuse	Pierre Gaspard-Huit
1961	The Three Musketeers	d'Artagnan	Bernard Borderie
1961	The Corsican Brothers	Giovanni Sagona	Anton Giulio Majano
1962	Le Chevalier de Pardaillan	Chevalier Jean de Pardaillan	Bernard Borderie
1963	Shéhérazade	Renaud de Villecroix	Pierre Gaspard-Huit
1963	The Adventures of Scaramouche	Scaramouche / Robert Lafleur	Antonio Isasi-Isasmendi
1964	Gibraltar	Frank Jackson	Pierre Gaspard-Huit
1964	Hardi Pardaillan!	Chevalier Jean de Pardaillan	Bernard Borderie
1965	The Treasure of the Aztecs	Comte Alfonso di Rodriganda y Sevilla	Robert Siodmak
1965	The Pyramid of the Sun God	Comte Alfonso di Rodriganda y Sevilla	Robert Siodmak
1966	Agent X-77 Orders to Kill	Serge Vadile, agent X 13	Maurice Cloche
1966	The Sea Pirate	Robert Surcouf	Sergio Bergonzelli, Roy Rowland
1966	Tonnerre sur l'océan Indien	Robert Surcouf	Sergio Bergonzelli, Roy Rowland
1966	Sale temps pour les mouches	Commissaire San-Antonio	Guy Lefranc
1967	Zärtliche Haie	Gregory	Michel Deville
1968	Adriatic Sea of Fire	Michel Masic	Alexandre Astruc
1968	Beru and These Women	Commissaire San-Antonio	Guy Lefranc
1969	The Witness	Van Britten	Anne Walter
1997	Open Your Eyes	Duvernois	Alejandro Amenábar
2000	Sexy Beast	a Spanish official	Jonathan Glazer
