= Kelo Henderson =

American film and television actor (1923–2019)

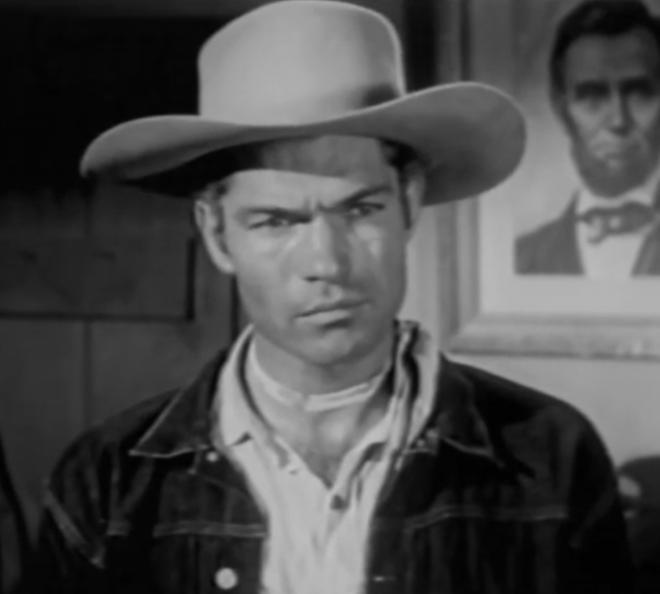
- Henderson in 26 Men, 1957
- Born: Paul Lars Henderson, Jr. August 8, 1923; Pueblo, Colorado, U.S.
- Died: December 10, 2019 (aged 96); Ridgecrest, California, U.S.
- Occupations: Film and television actor
- Spouse: Gail Henderson
- Children: 2

Paul Lars Henderson, Jr. (August 8, 1923 – December 10, 2019) was an American film and television actor. He was best known for playing Ranger Clint Travis in the American western television series 26 Men.

== Life and career ==
Henderson was born and raised on a ranch in Pueblo, Colorado, and became an expert marksman. He attended Santa Monica High School, graduating in 1942. After graduating, he joined the United States Merchant Marine, training in Navy boot camp and at the United States Merchant Marine Academy before serving until the end of World War II, which after his discharge, he moved to Santa Monica, California.

Henderson began his screen career in 1957, appearing in the ABC western television series Cheyenne, and adopting the stage name Kelo Henderson. In the same year, he starred as Ranger Clint Travis in the syndicated western television series 26 Men, starring along with Tris Coffin. After the series ended in 1959, he guest-starred in television programs including Tales of Wells Fargo and Sergeant Preston of the Yukon and Saddle the Wind. He played Frank Wilson in Robert Siodmak's The Treasure of the Aztecs and The Pyramid of the Sun God. He also appeared in films such as Return to Warbow, Sergeant Preston of the Yukon and Saddle the Wind.

In 2003, Henderson was awarded with the Golden Boot Award.

== Death ==
Henderson died on December 10, 2019 from complications of surgical procedure in Ridgecrest, California, at the age of 96.
