= 26 Men =

- Genre: Western
- Directed by: Franklin Adreon; Joseph Kane; Reg Browne; Oliver Drake
- Starring: Tristram Coffin; Kelo Henderson
- Theme music composer: Russell Hayden; Hal Hopper
- Composers: Al Sack; Gordon Zahler
- Country of origin: United States
- Original language: English
- No. of seasons: 2
- No. of episodes: 78

Production
- Executive producer: Russell Hayden
- Producers: William Dennis; Russell Hayden
- Cinematography: Buddy Harris; John Mathew Nickolaus Jr.; Kenneth Peach; J.D. Weiler
- Editors: Tom Biggart; Reg Browne; Frank Capacchione; Everett Dodd; Axel Hubert Sr.; Roy V. Livingston
- Running time: 25 minutes
- Production company: Russell Hayden Productions

Original release
- Network: Syndication
- Release: November 1, 1957 – June 30, 1959

26 Men is a syndicated American Western television series about the Arizona Rangers, a law-enforcement group limited to 26 active members. By March 1958, the program was carried on 158 stations in the United States. The program was also broadcast on ATN-7 in Australia and on ZBM-TV in Bermuda.

== Synopsis and background ==
The series is set in the Arizona Territory in the first decade of the 20th century. The rangers were part of the group established by the Arizona Territorial Legislature in 1901. The number of members was limited to 26 "to avoid vigilantism". Information from government archives and newspapers provided the basis of the plots of episodes.

== Critical response ==
A review in the trade publication Variety said that the premiere episode had "clean action and plot situations", making it different from the era's trend toward adult Westerns. It commended the work of Tris Coffin and Kelo Henderson and the pacing of the direction but noted that production values appeared weaker than those of Western programs on networks.

== Cast ==
=== Main ===
- Tris Coffin as Captain Thomas H. Rynning
- Kelo Henderson as ranger Clint Travis.

=== Guest stars ===
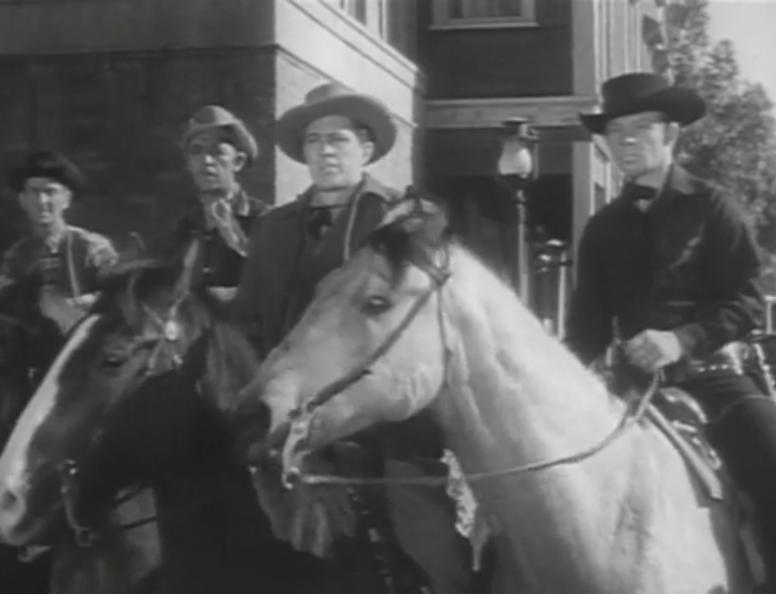
Tex Palmer, Hal Hopper, Don Haggerty and William Murphy in 26 Men, 1957

- Rico Alaniz
- Rayford Barnes
- Baynes Barron
- Robert Blake
- Edgar Buchanan
- Richard H. Cutting
- Steve Darrell
- Karl Davis
- Mason Alan Dinehart
- William Fawcett
- Richard Garland
- Don Haggerty
- Ron Hayes
- Tom Hennesy
- Hal Hopper
- I. Stanford Jolley
- Robert Karnes
- DeForest Kelley
- George Keymas
- Lash LaRue
- Forrest Lewis
- Jackie Loughery
- Jeanne Carmen as Lili Mae Turner
- Walter Maslow
- Doug McClure
- William Murphy
- Leonard Nimoy
- Gregg Palmer
- Tex Palmer
- Denver Pyle
- Maudie Prickett
- Richard Reeves
- Kim Spalding
- Glenn Strange
- William Swan
- Dub Taylor
- Carol Thurston
- Gregory Walcott
- Patrick Waltz
- Alan Wells
- Grant Withers

== Episodes ==
=== Series overview ===
Season	Episodes	Originally released	
Season	Episodes	First released	Last released
1	39	October 15, 1957	July 15, 1958
2	39	October 7, 1958	June 30, 1959

=== Season 1 (1957–58) ===
No. overall	No. in season	Title	Directed by	Written by	Original release date
1	1	"The Recruit"	Reg Browne	Unknown	October 15, 1957
2	2	"Trouble at Pinnacle Peak"	Reg Browne	Sloan Nibley	October 22, 1957
3	3	"The Wild Bunch"	Reg Browne	Buckley Angell	October 29, 1957
4	4	"Border Incident"	Reg Browne	Joe Richardson	November 5, 1957
5	5	"Destination Nowhere"	Unknown	Dwight V. Babcock	November 12, 1957
6	6	"Incident at Yuma"	Reg Browne	Ed Repp	November 19, 1957
7	7	"The Slater Brothers"	Oliver Drake	Terence Maples & Sam Roeca & Tom Hubbard	November 26, 1957
8	8	"Dead Man in Tucson"	Reg Browne	Tom Hubbard & Sam Roeca	December 3, 1957
9	9	"Man on the Run"	Oliver Drake	Sam Roeca & Tom Hubbard & Will George	December 10, 1957
10	10	"The Big Rope"	Oliver Drake	John K. Butler	December 17, 1957
11	11	"Valley of Fear"	Unknown	Sloan Nibley	December 24, 1957
12	12	"Indian Gunslinger"	Reg Browne	Frank Graves	December 31, 1957
13	13	"Trail of Darkness"	Unknown	Joe Richardson	January 7, 1958
14	14	"Trade Me Deadly"	Oliver Drake	Buckley Angell	January 14, 1958
15	15	"Violent Land"	Unknown	Unknown	January 28, 1958
16	16	"Panic at Bisbee"	Unknown	Unknown	February 4, 1958
17	17	"Insurrection"	Unknown	Dwight V. Babcock	February 11, 1958
18	18	"Slaughter Trail"	Unknown	Unknown	February 18, 1958
19	19	"Gun Hand"	Unknown	Unknown	February 25, 1958
20	20	"Cattle Embargo"	Unknown	Unknown	March 4, 1958
21	21	"Badge to Kill"	Unknown	Unknown	March 11, 1958
22	22	"Montezuma's Cave"	Unknown	Unknown	March 18, 1958
23	23	"Sundown Decision"	Unknown	Unknown	March 25, 1958
24	24	"The Parrish Gang"	Unknown	Unknown	April 1, 1958
25	25	"Hoax at Globe"	Unknown	Unknown	April 8, 1958
26	26	"The Bounty Hunter"	Unknown	Unknown	April 15, 1958
27	27	"Apache Water"	Unknown	Unknown	April 22, 1958
28	28	"Legacy of Death"	Oliver Drake	Oliver Drake	April 29, 1958
29	29	"Chain Gang"	Unknown	Unknown	May 6, 1958
30	30	"The Bells of St. Thomas"	Oliver Drake	Oliver Drake	May 13, 1958
31	31	"Hondo Man"	Unknown	Unknown	May 20, 1958
32	32	"The Vanquisher"	Unknown	Fonville McWhorter, Jr	May 27, 1958
33	33	"The Ranger and the Lady"	Unknown	Unknown	June 3, 1958
34	34	"Idol in the Dust"	Unknown	Unknown	June 10, 1958
35	35	"Runaway Stage"	Unknown	Unknown	June 17, 1958
36	36	"Wayward Gun"	Unknown	Unknown	June 24, 1958
37	37	"Hole Up"	Unknown	Unknown	July 1, 1958
38	38	"Unholy Partners"	Unknown	Unknown	July 8, 1958
39	39	"Killer's Trail"	Unknown	Unknown	July 15, 1958

=== Season 2 (1958–59) ===
No. overall	No. in season	Title	Directed by	Written by	Original release date
40	1	"The Glory Road"	Unknown	Unknown	October 7, 1958
41	2	"Shadow of Doubt"	Unknown	Unknown	October 14, 1958
42	3	"Man in Hiding"	Unknown	Unknown	October 21, 1958
43	4	"Cross and Double Cross"	Unknown	Unknown	October 28, 1958
44	5	"The Last Rebellion"	Unknown	Unknown	November 4, 1958
45	6	"Brief Glory"	Unknown	Unknown	November 11, 1958
46	7	"Dog Eat Dog"	Unknown	Unknown	November 18, 1958
47	8	"Judge Not"	Unknown	Unknown	November 25, 1958
48	9	"My Brother's Keeper"	Unknown	Unknown	December 2, 1958
49	10	"Run No More"	Unknown	Unknown	December 9, 1958
50	11	"The Manhunt"	Unknown	Unknown	December 16, 1958
51	12	"The Avenger"	Unknown	Unknown	December 23, 1958
52	13	"False Witness"	Unknown	Unknown	December 30, 1958
53	14	"The Torch"	Unknown	Unknown	January 6, 1959
54	15	"Trail of Revenge"	Unknown	Unknown	January 13, 1959
55	16	"The Hellion"	Unknown	Unknown	January 20, 1959
56	17	"Ranger Without a Badge"	Unknown	Unknown	January 27, 1959
57	18	"The Showdown"	Unknown	Unknown	February 3, 1959
58	19	"The Long Trail Home"	Unknown	Unknown	February 10, 1959
59	20	"Death in the Dragoons"	Unknown	Unknown	February 17, 1959
60	21	"Ricochet"	Unknown	Unknown	February 24, 1959
61	22	"House Divided"	Unknown	Unknown	March 3, 1959
62	23	"Profane Masquerade"	Unknown	Unknown	March 10, 1959
63	24	"Dead or Alive"	Unknown	Unknown	March 17, 1959
64	25	"The Has Been"	Unknown	Unknown	March 24, 1959
65	26	"The Unwanted"	Unknown	Unknown	March 31, 1959
66	27	"Live and Let Die"	Unknown	Unknown	April 7, 1958
67	28	"Trial at Verde River"	Unknown	Unknown	April 14, 1959
68	29	"Scorpion"	Unknown	Unknown	April 21, 1959
69	30	"The Last Kill"	Unknown	Unknown	April 28, 1959
70	31	"Redskin"	Unknown	Unknown	May 5, 1959
71	32	"Cave-In"	Unknown	Unknown	May 12, 1959
72	33	"Terror in Paradise"	Unknown	Unknown	May 19, 1959
73	34	"Fighting Man"	Unknown	Unknown	May 26, 1959
74	35	"Tumbleweed Ranger"	Unknown	Unknown	June 2, 1959
75	36	"The Tiger"	Unknown	Unknown	June 9, 1959
76	37	"Abandoned"	Unknown	Unknown	June 16, 1959
77	38	"Bandit Queen"	Unknown	Unknown	June 23, 1959
78	39	"Refuge at Broken Bow"	Unknown	Unknown	June 30, 1959

== Production ==
Russell Hayden was the producer of the ABC Film Syndication series. Reg Browne was the director, Sloane Nibley was the writer, and Oliver Drake was the adapter. The theme song was written by Hal Hopper.

Facilities of Cudia City Studios, in Phoenix, Arizona, were expanded to handle filming of 26 Men. When the series filmed on location, local residents often filled some roles in the cast. It was "reportedly the first TV series ever to be filmed completely in Arizona."

=== Sponsors ===
As a syndicated program, 26 Men had different sponsors in different parts of the United States. They included H. P. Hood and Sons (a dairy) for all of New England; Mrs. Smith's Pie Company and Freihofer Baking Company (alternating weekly) in four cities in Pennsylvania; Atlantic & Pacific Tea Company in Pittsburgh, Syracuse, and Buffalo; and Standard Oil of Texas in eight markets in Texas and New Mexico.

== Release ==
=== Home media ===
Timeless Media Group released a 3-disc best-of set, featuring 20 episodes from the series on DVD in Region 1 on April 12, 2011.

UK television network Talking Pictures TV began a re-run of series 1 from Wednesday 9 October 2024
