= Les Lavandières du Portugal =

- Directed by: Pierre Gaspard-Huit
- Written by: Jean Marsan
- Starring: Anne Vernon; Jean-Claude Pascal
- Cinematography: Roger Fellous
- Music by: André Popp
- Distributed by: Pathé Consortium
- Release date: 23 August 1957
- Running time: 100 Min.
- Country: France
- Language: French

Les Lavandières du Portugal (The Washerwomen of Portugal) is a 1957 French film comedy directed by Pierre Gaspard-Huit. It was produced by Les Films Univers, Société Pathé Cinéma and Suevia Films (Madrid), distributed by Pathé Consortium and developed by Laboratoire Franay L.T.C Saint-Cloud with montage by LAX. It was shot between 2 May and 6 June 1957 and released on 23 August that year.

== Plot ==
Two companies are in fierce competition to carry out the publicity for the new American 'Floc' washing machine, with two teams led by Jean-François and Catherine. They both go to Portugal to try to tempt a jolly washerwoman to come to Paris to take part in the launch and both teams try to eliminate the competition. Catherine manages to find a suitable candidate, Mariana, but Jean-François manages to get her to follow him to Paris by offering to marry her.

== Crew ==
- Director : Pierre Gaspard-Huit
- Director (Spanish version) : Ramon Torrado
- Screenplay: Jean Marsan, Madeleine Lefèvre
- Adaptation : Pierre Gaspard-Huit, Pierre Lary and Jean Marsan
- Dialogue : Jean Marsan
- Assistant Directors : Pierre Simon, Pierre Lary
- Music : André Popp
- Photography : Roger Fellous
- Camera Operator : Maurice Fellous, assisted by Claude Lecomte and Claude Robin
- Sets : Roger Guisgand, assisted by Roger Briaucourt
- Editing : Fanchette Mazin, assisted by Simone du Bron
- Sound : René Sarazin, assisted by Jean Monchablon
- Makeup : Maurice Debanoff
- Landscape Photography : Henri Thibault
- Hair : Janine Pottier
- Costume (urban) : Designed by Alwyn
- Costume (regional) : Madame Samazeuil, after designs by Rodriguez Ferreira
- Costumes (bathing) : Port-Cros
- Location Manager : Roger Descoffre
- Location Manager (Exterior) : Roger Bar
- Producers: José Bénazéraf, Georges Glass and Cesáreo González
- Production Director : Jean Velter, assisted by Marguerite Théoule
- Executive Producers : Pierre Cabaud and René Bézard

== Cast ==
- Jean-Claude Pascal : Jean-François Aubray, publicitaire
- Anne Vernon : Catherine Deligny, la publicitaire rivale
- Paquita Rico : Mariana, la lavandière portugaise
- Darry Cowl : Paul, un aimable farfelu de génie, chef de l'Agence de Publicité Nouvelle
- Jean-Marie Proslier : Marc, le photographe de Jean-François
- Marcel André : M. Dubois, le directeur de l'agence publicitaire OPI
- André Randall : André Molinié, le PDG des lessives Floc
- Yvonne Monlaur : Nadine
- Carine Jansen : Maryse, l'assistante de Catherine
- Anne-Marie Baumann : L'actrice à la descente de l'avion
- Max Montavon : L'employé de la maison de disques
- Albert Michel : Le peintre qui chante dans le couloir
- Robert Le Béal : l'aubergiste
- Louis Massis : Le réalisateur de la "Pub"
- Germaine de France : Une dame de l'hôtel
- Jean-Pierre Jaubert : Un photographe
- Jean Droze : Le journaliste pour le lancement de la machine
- René Lefebvre-Bel : Le directeur à l'aéroport
- René Aranda: Un journaliste
- Marius Gaidon : Un journaliste
- Albert Daumergue : Un serveur
- Raymond Pierson : L'homme qui veut prendre l'ascenseur en panne (uncredited)
- Aimé de March : Un homme à la réception
- Roger Lécuyer : Un homme à la réception
- Michel Montfort
- Erico Braga
- Patricio Alvares
- Jacques Debary
- André Badin
- Elga Andersen "Elga Hymmen"
- Micheline Delanbre
- Michèle Frison
- Ellen Picard
- Jacqueline Fontel
- Barbara Brault
- Georges Sauval
- Pedro "Ignacio" Paul
- Georges Montant
- Manuel Requena
- José Borja
- Jean Marsan
- Liliane David
- Sylvie Solar
