= Virginie (film) =

1962 film

- Directed by: Jean Boyer
- Written by: Michel André; Jean Boyer
- Produced by: Pierre Braunberger; Robert Dorfmann
- Starring: Roger Pierre; Jean-Marc Thibault; Michèle Girardon
- Cinematography: Christian Matras
- Edited by: Jacqueline Brachet
- Music by: Claude Stieremans
- Production companies: Les Films Corona; Les Films de la Pléiade
- Distributed by: Les Films Corona
- Release date: 17 October 1962
- Running time: 85 minutes
- Country: France
- Language: French

Virginie is a 1962 French comedy film directed by Jean Boyer and starring Roger Pierre, Jean-Marc Thibault and Michèle Girardon.

== Synopsis ==
Two friends, a journalist and a scientist, plan to sail to Argentina for an expedition of discovery, but their plans are thrown into confusion when they rescue two attractive women.

== Cast ==
- Roger Pierre as Pierre
- Jean-Marc Thibault as Olivier
- Michèle Girardon as Betty
- Mireille Darc as Brigitte

== Bibliography ==
- Jean-Pierre Mattei. La Corse, les Corses et le cinéma: cinquante ans de cinéma parlant, 1929–1980, Volume 2. A. Piazzola, 2008.
