= René Bezard =

French film producer

- Born: 20 August 1920; Le Mans, France
- Died: 30 March 2008 (aged 87); Versailles, France
- Occupation: Producer
- Years active: 1948-1963 (film)

René Bezard (1920–2008) was a French film producer and mining engineer. From 1950 to 1963 he was managing director of Pathé having previously overseen the Franstudio group of film studios. He later returned to his career in mining and electronics.

== Selected filmography ==
- Cadet Rousselle (1954)
- Rififi (1955)
- Deadlier Than the Male (1956)
- Mannequins of Paris (1956)
- Les Lavandières du Portugal (1957)
- Captain Blood (1960)
- Le Tracassin (1961)

== Bibliography ==
- Kinnard, Roy & Crnkovich, Tony . Italian Sword and Sandal Films, 1908–1990. McFarland, 2017.
- Palmer, Tim & Michael, Charlie. Directory of World Cinema: France. Intellect Books, 2013.
