= The Hour of Truth (1965 film) =

1965 film

- Directed by: Henri Calef
- Written by: Henri Calef; Maurice Clavel; Edgar Morin
- Produced by: Meyer Maghen; Yoel Neuman
- Starring: Karlheinz Böhm; Brett Halsey; Corinne Marchand
- Cinematography: Jean Collomb; Claude Renoir
- Edited by: Henri Calef; Jacques Mavel
- Music by: Henri Sauguet
- Production companies: Jad Films; Noy Films
- Distributed by: Jad Films
- Release date: 29 April 1965
- Running time: 101 minutes
- Countries: France; Israel
- Language: French

The Hour of Truth (French: L'heure de la vérité) is a 1965 French-Israeli drama film directed by Henri Calef and starring Karlheinz Böhm, Brett Halsey and Corinne Marchand. Daniel Gélin makes a brief appearance in the film. Location shooting took place around Ashdod.

== Synopsis ==
Jonathan, a concentration camp survivor living in Israel remains a man haunted by his past, despite his lovely wife and engineering job. When an American journalist comes to interview him about his time in his camp, of which he was the only survivor, it comes to seem possible that he is not the victim he claimed to be but one of the perpetrators.

== Cast ==
- Karlheinz Böhm as Jonathan
- Brett Halsey as Fred
- Corinne Marchand as Dahlia
- Michèle Girardon as Chérie
- Daniel Gélin as David
- André Oumansky as Daniel
- Misha Asherov as Benjamin
- Rina Ganor as Léa

== Bibliography ==
- Brownstein, Rich. Holocaust Cinema Complete: A History and Analysis of 400 Films, with a Teaching Guide. McFarland, 2021.
- Rège, Philippe. Encyclopedia of French Film Directors, Volume 1. Scarecrow Press, 2009.
- Reimer, Robert C. & Reimer, Carol J. Historical Dictionary of Holocaust Cinema. Bloomsbury Publishing, 2024.
