= Georges Wilson =

French actor and director

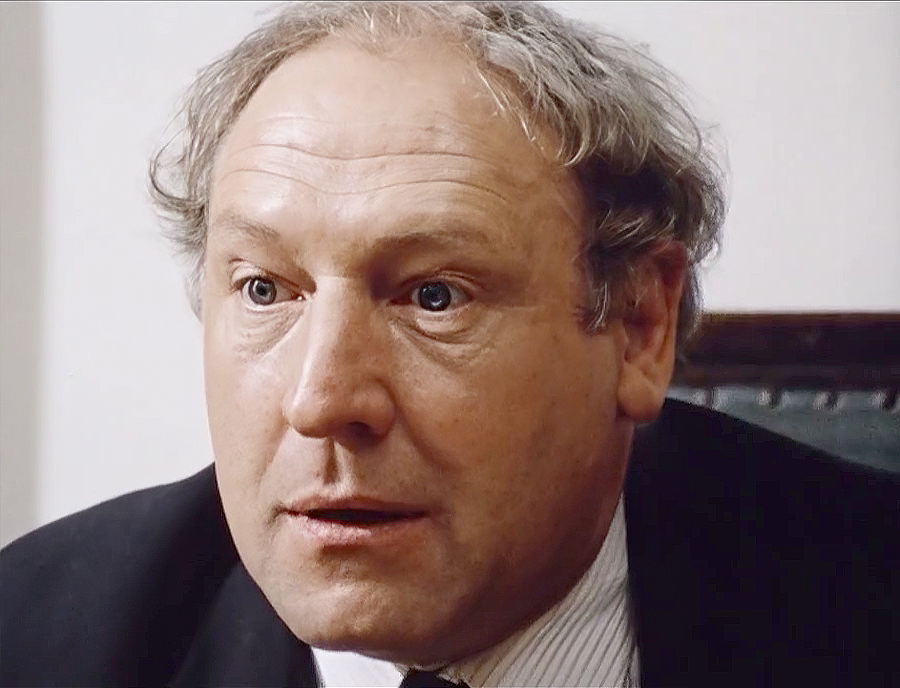
- Wilson in The Stranger (1967)
- Born: Georges Willson; 16 October 1921; Champigny-sur-Marne, Val-de-Marne, France
- Died: 3 February 2010 (aged 88); Rambouillet, Yvelines, France
- Other names: George Wilson, Georges Wilson du T.N.P.
- Occupations: Actor; director
- Years active: 1946–2008
- Known for: Director of the Théâtre National Populaire (1963-72)
- Spouse: Nicole Wilson
- Children: 2; including Lambert

Georges Wilson (né Willson, French: [ʒɔʁʒ wilsɔn]; 16 October 1921 – 3 February 2010) was a French actor and director of stage and screen. He was a significant figure in French theatre during the latter 20th-century, serving as director of the Théâtre National Populaire from 1963 and 1972, while his film work earned him both BAFTA Award and Cesar Award nominations. He was also the father of French actor Lambert Wilson.

== Biography ==
Wilson was born in Champigny-sur-Marne, Seine (now Val-de-Marne) as the illegitimate son of a French father and an Irish mother. His professional surname, Wilson, derives from his Irish grandmother; his birthname has not been made public.

He was nominated for a BAFTA Film Award, and also nominated for a César Award. Georges Wilson's last film was Mesrine: Public Enemy Number One.

From 1963 to 1972 Georges Wilson was the director of the Théâtre national de Chaillot (formerly known as the Théâtre National Populaire).

Georges Wilson died in Rambouillet in 2010, aged 88, from undisclosed causes.

== Selected filmography ==
- Martin Roumagnac (1946) – Un jeune homme dans le convoi funèbre (uncredited)
- Skipper Next to God (1951) – Un passager juif (uncredited)
- Open Letter (1953) – Un locataire
- La môme vert-de-gris (1953) – Duncan a.k.a. Melander
- The Red and the Black (1954) – M. Binet
- Les Hussards (1955) – Le capitaine Georges
- Bonjour Toubib (1957) – Timbarelle
- The Green Mare (1959) – Jules Haudouin
- Dialogue of the Carmelites (1960) – L'aumônier du Carmel
- Le Farceur (1960) – Guillaume Berlon
- Wasteland (1960) – His Honour J. Royer the juvenile judge
- Le Caïd (1960) – Monsieur 'A'
- Une aussi longue absence (1961) – Le clochard
- The Fascist (1961) – Prof. Erminio Bonafé
- Tintin and the Golden Fleece (1961) – Captain Haddock
- Dark Journey (1961) – Husband
- The Seven Deadly Sins (1962) – Valentin (segment "Gourmandise, La")
- Disorder (1962) – Don Giuseppe
- Carillons sans joie (1962) – Le père de Léa
- Le Diable et les Dix Commandements (1962) – Marcel Messager (segment "Tes père et mère honoreras")
- The Longest Day (1962) – Alexandre Renaud
- The Four Days of Naples (1962) – Reformatory Director (uncredited)
- Mandrin (1962) – Bélissard
- Any Number Can Win (1963) – Walther (uncredited)
- Sweet and Sour (1963) – Casimir
- Chair de poule (1963) – Thomas
- The Empty Canvas (1963) – Cecilia's Father
- Faites sauter la banque! (1964) – L'agent cycliste / The policeman
- Lucky Jo (1964) – Simon
- Un monde nouveau (1966) – Le Patron
- The Stranger (1967) – Examining Magistrate
- More Than a Miracle (1967) – Jean-Jacques Bouché 'Monzu'
- Beatrice Cenci (1969) – Francesco Cenci
- Max et les Ferrailleurs (1971) – Le Commissaire
- Blanche (1971) – The King
- The Case Is Closed, Forget It (1971) – Campoloni
- La violenza: quinto potere (1972) – Crupi
- Don't Torture a Duckling (1972) – Francesco
- Il generale dorme in piedi (1972) – Gen. Botta
- Sono stato io (1973)
- The Three Musketeers (1973) – Treville
- ...E di Saul e dei sicari sulle vie di Damasco (1973) – Shaùl
- Chinese in Paris (1974) – Lefranc
- Love at the Top (1974) – Lourceuil
- The Slap (1974) – Pierre
- The Peaceful Age (1975) – L'altro
- Le Jeune Homme et le Lion (1976, TV film) – Charlemagne
- The Brothers (1977) – Dr. Rudolf Fachmin
- The Apprentice Heel (1977) – Maître Chappardon / Monsieur Marcel / L'héritier ronchon / L'expert escroc
- Tendre Poulet (1977) – Alexandre Mignonac
- Ecco noi per esempio (1977) – Melano Melani
- Les Ringards (1978) – CommissaireGarmiche
- Lady Oscar (1979) – M. de Bouillé, French Guard General
- Au bout du bout du banc (1979) – Eric Oppenheim
- Le bar du téléphone (1980) – Léopold Kretzchman
- Le cheval d'orgueil (1980) – Récitant / Narrator (voice)
- Asphalte (1981) – Le professeur Kalendarian – un chirurgien débordé
- Cserepek (1981)
- Fruits of Passion (1981) – Le narrateur (voice)
- Portrait of a Woman, Nude (1981) – Arch. Zanetto
- A Captain's Honor (1982) – Le bâtonnier
- Itinéraire bis (1983) – Charles
- Tangos, the Exile of Gardel (1985) – Jean-Marie
- Gandahar (1988) – Métamorphe (voice)
- La Passion de Bernadette (1989) – Mgr Dupanloup
- My Mother's Castle (1990) – Le comte colonel
- La Tribu (1991) – Castaing
- Mayrig (1991) – (uncredited)
- Cache Cash (1994) – Louis
- Marie de Nazareth (1995) – Récitant (voice)
- Marquise (1997) – Floridor
- Sentimental Destinies (2000) – Robert Barnery
- Not Here to Be Loved (2005) – Le père de Jean-Claude
- L'Ennemi public nº 1 (2008) – Henri Lelièvre (final film role)
