= Michèle Girardon =

French actress

- Born: 9 August 1938; Lyon, France
- Died: 25 March 1975 (aged 36); Lyon, France
- Resting place: Cimetière parisien de Bagneux
- Other name: Michele Girardon
- Years active: 1956–1971
- Partner: José Luis de Vilallonga (1957–1972)

Michèle Girardon (9 August 1938 – 25 March 1975), sometimes credited as Michele Girardon, was a French actress.

== Early life and career ==
Born in Lyon, France, Girardon began acting as early as 1956, and had a small but noticeable role as a deaf-mute beauty in director Luis Buñuel's La mort en ce jardin (Death in the Garden) (1956). She soon became prominent in a host of films, including those of notable directors of the French New Wave. She is probably best known as an actress for her work in director Louis Malle's Les Amants (The Lovers) in 1958, and the 1961 Howard Hawks production of Hatari! starring John Wayne and Hardy Krüger; for the latter, as she spoke no English when cast in the role, she taught herself English while on the set, according to a July 1961 Life magazine profile of the actress. The same article stated she was signed to a five–year contract with Paramount Studios. 1963 proved to be her most active year, with several avant garde films to her credit including Pierre Kast's Vacances Portugaises (Portuguese Vacations), André Cayatte's experimental 'paired' films Jean-Marc ou La vie conjugale (Anatomy of a Marriage: My Days with Jean-Marc), and Françoise ou La vie conjugale (Anatomy of a Marriage: My Days with Françoise), and director Éric Rohmer's La Boulangère de Monceau (The Girl at the Monceau Bakery).

Girardon also worked in television. In 1967, she played Nicole in the first season of Les Chevaliers du ciel. The success of this series brought her a very high level of popularity.

== Personal life and suicide ==
During the 1960s, Girardon became romantically involved with a married Spanish nobleman and occasional actor, José Luis de Vilallonga, whom she had first met on the set of Les Amants. The couple lived together throughout much of the 1960s.

By 1971, Girardon's acting career was over and after finally obtaining his divorce in 1972, de Vilallonga ended their relationship to marry another woman, Syliane Stella Morell. Girardon never married or had children and became increasingly despondent. She committed suicide via an overdose of sleeping pills at the age of 36 in Lyon on 25 March 1975. She is interred near Lyon in the Cimetière de Sarcey, Rhône.

== Filmography ==
Film
| Year | Title | Role | Notes |
|---|---|---|---|
| 1956 | Death in the Garden | María Castin | French title: La mort en ce jardin |
| 1958 | Vive les vacances | Graziella | |
| 1958 | The Lovers | The secretary | French title: Les amants |
| 1959 | Vous n'avez rien à déclarer? | Paulette | |
| 1960 | Il principe fusto | Susan Burton | |
| 1961 | La Proie pour l'ombre | Anita | |
| 1961 | White Slave Ship | Anna | Italian title: L'ammutinamento |
| 1962 | The Seven Deadly Sins | Héloïse – la maîtresse | (segment "L'Orgueuil") |
| 1962 | Le Signe du Lion | Dominique Laurent | |
| 1962 | Hatari! | Brandy de la Court | Credited as Michele Girardon |
| 1962 | Virginie | Betty | |
| 1963 | The Adventures of Scaramouche | Diana – Souchil's ward | |
| 1963 | Portuguese Vacation | Geneviève | |
| 1963 | The Bakery Girl of Monceau | Sylvie | Short; French title: La Boulangère de Monceau |
| 1964 | Anatomy of a Marriage: My Days with Jean-Marc | Patricia | |
| 1964 | Anatomy of a Marriage: My Days with Françoise | Patricia | |
| 1964 | Devil of the Desert Against the Son of Hercules | Princess Soraya | Alternative titles: Anthar l'invincibile Anthar the Invincible; Soraya Reina Del Desierto |
| 1964 | The Magnificent Cuckold | Cristiana | Italian title: Il magnifico cornuto |
| 1965 | The Treasure of the Aztecs | Josefa | |
| 1965 | The Pyramid of the Sun God | Josefa | |
| 1965 | The Hour of Truth | Chérie | |
| 1966 | Tender Scoundrel | Girl at the Ritz | |
| 1968 | Drôle de jeu | Chloé | |
| 1968 | Red Roses for Angelica | Antoinette La Fleche | |
| 1968 | I'll Sell My Skin Dearly | Georgina Bennett | Italian title: Vendo cara la pelle |
| 1971 | Good Little Girls | Madame de Fleurville | French title: Les Petites Filles modèles |
| 1971 | Mais qui donc m'a fait ce bébé? | | (final film role) |
