= Michel Breitman =

French writer and translator (1926–2009)

- Born: 10 August 1926; Mennetou-sur-Cher
- Died: 16 May 2009 (aged 82); Rueil-Malmaison
- Occupations: Writer; Translator

Michel Breitman (10 August 1926 – 16 May 2009) was a French writer and translator. He won the 1986 edition of the Prix des Deux Magots with his novel Le Témoin de poussière.

A translator of Dino Buzzati, Breitman also published numerous novels, short stories and radio plays.

He wrote his first novel, Vétrino ou le bonhomme de verre directly in Italian, and upon returning to France, he wrote all his other works in his native tongue.

In 1964, he published the novella Sébastien.

The film Fortunat, featuring Bourvil and Michèle Morgan, was an adaptation of his eponymous novel published in 1955.

== Bibliography ==
- 1952: Carnet des Faux-Semblants, Mercure de France
- 1953: Vetrino, Vallechi Editore
- 1955: Fortunat, ou le père adopté, Éditions Denoël
- 1956: L'Homme aux mouettes, Denoël
- 1957: Le Mal de Dieu, Denoël
- 1958: Une lettre, Denoël
- 1964: Sébastien, Denoël
- 1970: D'exil en exil, Denoël
- 1985: Le Témoin de poussière, Laffont, Prix Ève Delacroix of the Académie française and Prix des Deux Magots
- 1995: Après la mort de l'homme, Éditions Julliard
