= Paulette Pax =

Paulette Pax (née Paulette Ménard born October 4, 1886 in Paris – died June 17, 1942 in Paris) was a French actress, theatre director and scenographer.

She co-directed the Théâtre de l'Œuvre from 1929 until her death succeeding Bella Rossellini.

== Theatre ==
=== Comedian ===
Selection of plays interpreted by Paulette Pax:

- 1920: La Couronne de carton by Jean Sarment
- 1921: La Gloire by Maurice Rostand
- 1921: Uncle Vanya by Anton Chekhov, directed by Sacha Pitoëff
- 1922: La Mort de Molière by Maurice Rostand
- 1923: L'Éveil du fauve by Edward Knoblauch
- 1924: Jeanne d'Arc by Charles Péguy, directed by Fernand Crommelynck
- 1925: Tripes d'or by Fernand Crommelynck, directed by Louis Jouvet
- 1926: Sardanapalus, directed by Georges Pitoëff
- 1926: L'Absolution by José Germain Drouilly
- 1926: Comme ci by Luigi Pirandello, directed by Georges Pitoëff
- 1927: Great Catherine: Whom Glory Still Adores by George Bernard Shaw
- 1929: Three Sisters by Anton Chekhov, directed by Georges Pitoëff
- 1935: La Complainte de Pranzini et de Thérèse de Lisieux by Henri Ghéon, directed by Georges Pitoëff
- 1936: Dame Nature by André Birabeau, sous la direction de Paulette Pax, at the Théâtre de l'Œuvre
- 1939: The Lady of the Camellias by Alexandre Dumas, fils, directed by Georges Pitoëff
- 1941: L'Amazone aux bas bleus by Albert Boussac de Saint-Marc, directed by Paulette Pax

=== Theatre director ===
- 1932: L'Hermine by Jean Anouilh
- 1933: Milmort by Paul Demasy
- 1934: Une femme libre by Armand Salacrou, mise en scène Paulette Pax
- 1935: Dame nature by André Birabeau, at the Théâtre de l'Œuvre
- 1936: Un homme comme les autres by Armand Salacrou, with Jean-Louis Barrault, at the Théâtre de l'Œuvre
- 1937: Gli indifferenti by Alberto Moravia
- 1938: Je vivrai un grand amour by Steve Passeur
- 1938: Le Jardin d'Ispahan by Jean-Jacques Bernard

== Filmography ==
- 1938: The Novel of Werther by Max Ophüls as aunt Emma
- 1938: Gibraltar by Fedor Ozep: Mme Nichols
- 1939: The White Slave by Marc Sorkin as Safète's friend

== Publication ==
- Journal d'une comédienne française: sous la terreur bolchevik, 1917–1918.
