= Les Hussards =

- Film poster
- Directed by: Alex Joffé
- Written by: Gabriel Arout; Jean Halain
- Based on: Les Hussards by Pierre-Aristide Bréal
- Produced by: Ignace Morgenstern
- Starring: Bernard Blier; Louis de Funès
- Cinematography: Raymond Heil
- Edited by: Henri Rust
- Music by: Georges Auric
- Production companies: Cocinor, Cocinex, Sédif
- Distributed by: Cocinor
- Release date: 8 November 1955
- Running time: 102 minutes
- Country: France
- Language: French

Les Hussards (English: Cavalrymen), is a French comedy film from 1955, directed by Alex Joffé, written by Gabriel Arout, starring Bernard Blier, Giovanna Ralli, Bourvil, and with Georges Wilson, Virna Lisi, Louis de Funès playing supporting roles. The film is known under the titles "Cavalrymen" (international English title), "Les hussards" (Belgium French title), "De husaren" (Belgium Flemish title), "La piccola guerra" (Italy), "Huszárok" (Hungary).

== Plot ==
During the Italian campaigns of the French Revolutionary Wars Brigadier Le Gouce and private Jean-Louis forfeit their horses. Afraid of a severe punishment both lie to Captain Georges. They just make up a story about them having been the target of a selective ambush. Little later their regiment is annihilated by an Austrian attack. Only the two humbuggers are lucky enough to survive. Napoleon has them celebrated as heroes and thus they get into the books of history.

== Cast ==
- Bernard Blier as Brigadier Le Gouce
- Giovanna Ralli as Cosima
- André Bourvil as private ("trumpeter") Jean-Louis
- Louis de Funès as Luigi, the sexton
- Virna Lisi as Elisa
- Clélia Matania as Mrs Luppi
- Georges Wilson as Captain Georges
- Marcel Daxely as Giacomo, the shepherd
- Carlo Campanini as Mr Luppi
- Giani Esposito as Pietro
- Jean-Marie Amato as Carotti, the shoemaker
- Franco Pesce as the clergyman
- Alberto Bonnuci as Raphaël
- Jess Hahn as a hussar
- Albert Rémy as a hussar
- Maurice Chevit as hussar Camille
- Roger Hanin as a soldier
- Paul Préboist
