= Alison Breitman =

American singer-songwriter

Alison Breitman is a singer, songwriter, guitarist and pianist. She was born in the suburbs of Chicago, Illinois and raised in Long Island, New York. She now lives and works in Chicago.

== Early life ==
Alison Breitman was born to Michael and Tammy Breitman.

Singing since the age of 4, she has been classically trained and is well versed in opera, musical theater and contemporary folk. In the mid-1990s she attended the University of Michigan, where she learned to play guitar and began writing songs.

== Career ==
Breitman moved to New York City in 2000 and began performing in clubs such as The Bitter End, CB's Gallery and The Baggot Inn. In 2001, she released her first album, The Good Person's Angel, a 10-song album of material she'd written from 1996 to 1998.

Breitman returned to the studio in 2004 to record her follow-up record, The Game, an 11-song album of songs written with fellow songwriter and friend, Eytan Oren. Produced by Assaf Spector, the album got Breitman together with a number of New York studio musicians for a handful of band dates around the city when she wasn't doing solo acoustic gigs. The Game received critical acclaim around numerous blogger spots on the web, including a feature review by Daily Candy.

In 2005, Breitman moved to Chicago, where she continues to perform live and write new music.

== Discography ==
=== LPs ===
- The Good Person's Angel (2001)
- The Game (2004)
