= Fortunat =

- Original film poster
- Directed by: Alex Joffé
- Written by: Alex Joffé; Michel Breitman (novel)
- Starring: Bourvil; Michèle Morgan
- Cinematography: Pierre Petit
- Edited by: Eric Pluet
- Music by: Denis Kieffer
- Production companies: Cinétel; Produzioni Cinematografiche Mediterranee (PCM); Silver Films
- Distributed by: Cinédis
- Release date: 16 November 1960
- Running time: 121 minutes
- Countries: France; Italy
- Language: French

Fortunat (English: Fortunate) is a 1960 Franco-Italian co-production motion picture comedy directed and written by Alex Joffé, based on a novel by Michel Breitman. The film stars Bourvil and Michèle Morgan.

It tells the story of a lazy man who helps a sociable lady and her children from the Nazis.

== Plot ==
In Occupied France during the Second World War, destiny brings together the poacher Fortunat, an honest guy with a weakness for drink, and Juliette, an elegant woman with two children: Pierre and Maurice. Miss Massillon, a helpful teacher, tries to help Juliette who is being hunted by the Nazis after the arrest of her husband, a leader of the Resistance. Juliette and her children must reach the French-controlled zone in the south, to take refuge in Toulouse. For that it is necessary for them to cross the Demarcation line. It is Fortunat who is charged with leading the two children and their mother to safety. Close links will link Fortunat and Juliette. A scene of film implies clearly that they have a sexual relationship at least once. After the Liberation of France, Juliette is reunited with her husband, and Fortunat returns to his life as a single man.

== Cast ==
- Michèle Morgan - Juliette
- Bourvil - Fortunat
- Gaby Morlay - Miss Massillon
- Rosy Varte - Mrs. Falk
