= Gabriel Arout =

French playwright (1909–1982)

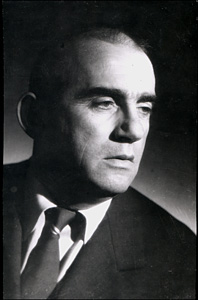
- Arout in 1956
- Died: 14 February 1982 (aged 73)
- Known for: Writer, dramatist and translator

Gabriel Arout (French: [ɡabʁijɛl aʁu]; 1909–1982) was a Russian-born French writer of Armenian descent. He wrote more than 20 plays for the stage, several screenplays for cinema, and translated a number of Russian literary works into French. He was awarded the top prize for drama by the Académie française in 1978.

== Biography ==
Gabriel Arout was born Gabriel Aroutcheff in Nakhichevan-on-Don, Russia on 28 January 1909.

Having witnessed the war and the Russian Revolution, Arout arrived with his family in France by way of the Mediterranean in 1921. He attended school at the Lycée Charlemagne where he became friends with Paul Ackerman. In 1930, he graduated from the Sorbonne. Although initially attracted to the novel, he decided to turn his attention to the theater. He wrote his first play Orpheus or the Fear of Miracles in 1935, but it was a flop at its performance debut in 1943. His second play, Pauline or the Foam of the Sea (1948), which starred Pierre Fresnay, was a great success. Other successes followed: Gog and Magog, This Strange Animal, Twice Two Make Five, and Apples for Eve.

In the mid-1950s, Arout made several incursions into the world of cinema. He co-wrote the dialogue of Alex Joffé's Les Hussards (1955), in which Bourvil had a leading role. He was also the co-author of Marc Allégret's adaptation of Sois Belle et Tais-toi (1958) and the dialogue of Death in the Garden (1956) by Luis Buñuel.

Arout was a lover of culture, and was particularly passionate about the legacy of the great Greek playwrights. He was the author of more than twenty plays that have been staged by directors such as Pierre Dux, Michel Vitold, Claude Regy and Georges Vitaly, with François Périer, Jean Piat, Denise Gence, Jean Rochefort and Louis Velle among the first interpreters.

Arout was awarded the 1978 grand prize of the Société des auteurs et compositeurs dramatiques and in 1981 the grand prize for theater of the Académie française. His last play Yes ends with a long testamentary monologue in which the man realizes he is master of his own destiny.

Arout died in Paris on 12 February 1982.

In 2002, his comedy The Strange Animal was re-staged at the Théâtre de Nesle, Paris with Anne-Elisabeth Blateau, Francis Prieur and Cédric Villenave in the lead roles.

Gabriel Arout also translated a number of Russian works in conjunction with his brother, translator Georges Arout (1911–1970, born Eugène Aroutcheff), including Dostoevsky's novel The Idiot (1946) and Vichnevsky's The Optimistic Tragedy (1951).

== Works ==
=== Theater ===
- The Gordian Knot (1939)
- The Ball of Lieutenant Helt (1948)
- Maupassant at Flaubert (1950)
- Twice Two Make Five or William the Confident or My Friend Guillaume (1951–1961)
- La Dame de Trèfle (1952) by Gabriel Arout, with Jean Vitold and Madeleine Robinson, set by Paul Ackerman, Théâtre Saint-Georges (Paris).
- The Bench (1953)
- The Cage (1954)
- Call Me Master or Tamara (1955), directed by Jacques Charon, Theater des Ambassadeurs, 16 March 1956
- Between Dog and Wolf (1955)
- Mademoiselle Fanny (1956)
- President Wilson (1958)
- Gog and Magog by Roger MacDougall and Ted Allan, translation, directed by François Périer, Théâtre de la Michodière, 1959
- A Taste of Honey by Shelagh Delaney, adaptation Gabriel Arout and Françoise Mallet-Jorris, directed by Marguerite Jamois, Théâtre des Mathurins, 12 February 1960
- The Alpinists (1960)
- Laure and the Jacques or Eve and the Men (1962)
- This Strange Animal (1964, according to news of Anton Chekhov)
- Mirages or Love and Theater (1964)
- The Beautiful Assassin (1968)
- Apples for Eve (1969)
- Dressage in Ferocity

=== Translation ===
- Anna Lucasta
- The Idiot of Dostoevsky (1946, translated with Georges Arout)
- Boris Godounov (1961)
- The Prosecution (1967)
- Death is in your Heart
- The Doll
- The Optimistic Tragedy of Vichnevski (1951, translated with Georges Arout)
- The World is in your Heart
- Mozart and Salieri (1941)
- Slag (1971)

== Filmography ==
Year	Title	Role	Notes
1967	The Unknown Man of Shandigor	Signe 1	
1977	Repérages	Le professeur de russe	(final film role)

== Awards and honors ==
- Prix SACD 1978 : Grand Prix de la SACD
- Grand Prix du Théâtre de l’Académie Français, 1981
