= Henri Calef =

French screenwriter and film director

Henri Calef (20 July 1910 – 18 August 1994) was a French screenwriter and film director.

== Selected filmography ==
=== Director ===
- Jericho (1946)
- The Royalists (1947)
- Crossroads of Passion (1948)
- Shadow and Light (1951)
- The Passerby (1951)
- The Secret of Helene Marimon (1954)
- The Violent (1957)
- The Hour of Truth (1965)

=== Writer ===
- The Lafarge Case (1938)
