= Jean-Marc Thibault =

French actor and film director

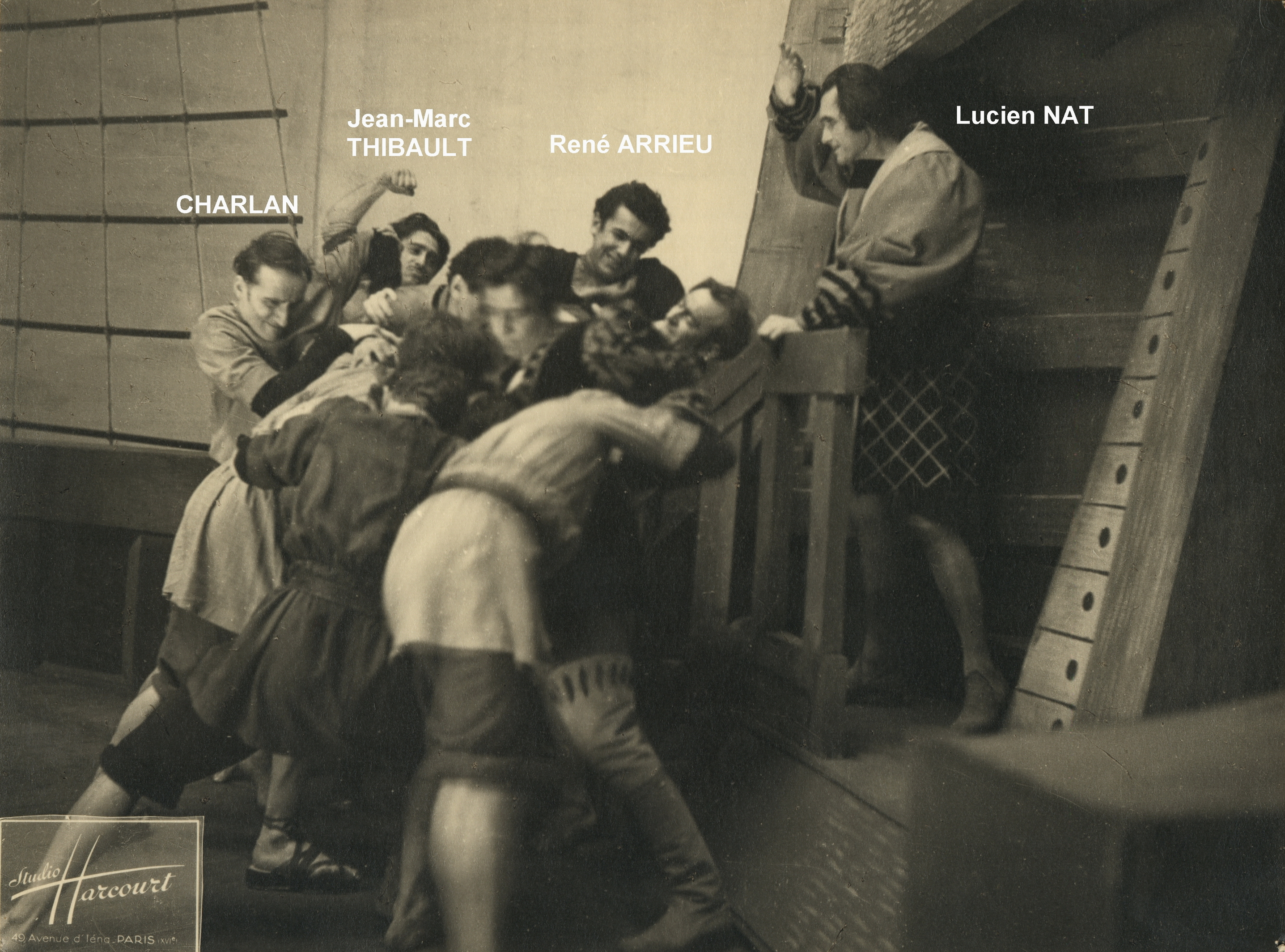
- 1943-05 Cristobal - Théâtre Montparnasse
- Born: 24 August 1923; Saint-Bris-le-Vineux, Yonne, France
- Died: 28 May 2017 (aged 93); Marseille, Bouches-du-Rhône, France
- Occupation: Actor
- Years active: 1944-2011

Jean-Marc Thibault (1923–2017) was a French film and television actor. He also directed three films.

== Selected filmography ==
- First on the Rope (1944)
- Cage of Girls (1949)
- I Like Only You (1949)
- Women of Paris (1953)
- Wonderful Mentality (1953)
- Open Letter (1953)
- Service Entrance (1954)
- Death on the Run (1954)
- Montmartre Nights (1955)
- Les Assassins du dimanche (1956)
- Napoleon II, the Eagle (1961)
- La Belle Américaine (1961)
- We Will Go to Deauville (1962)
- Virginie (1962)
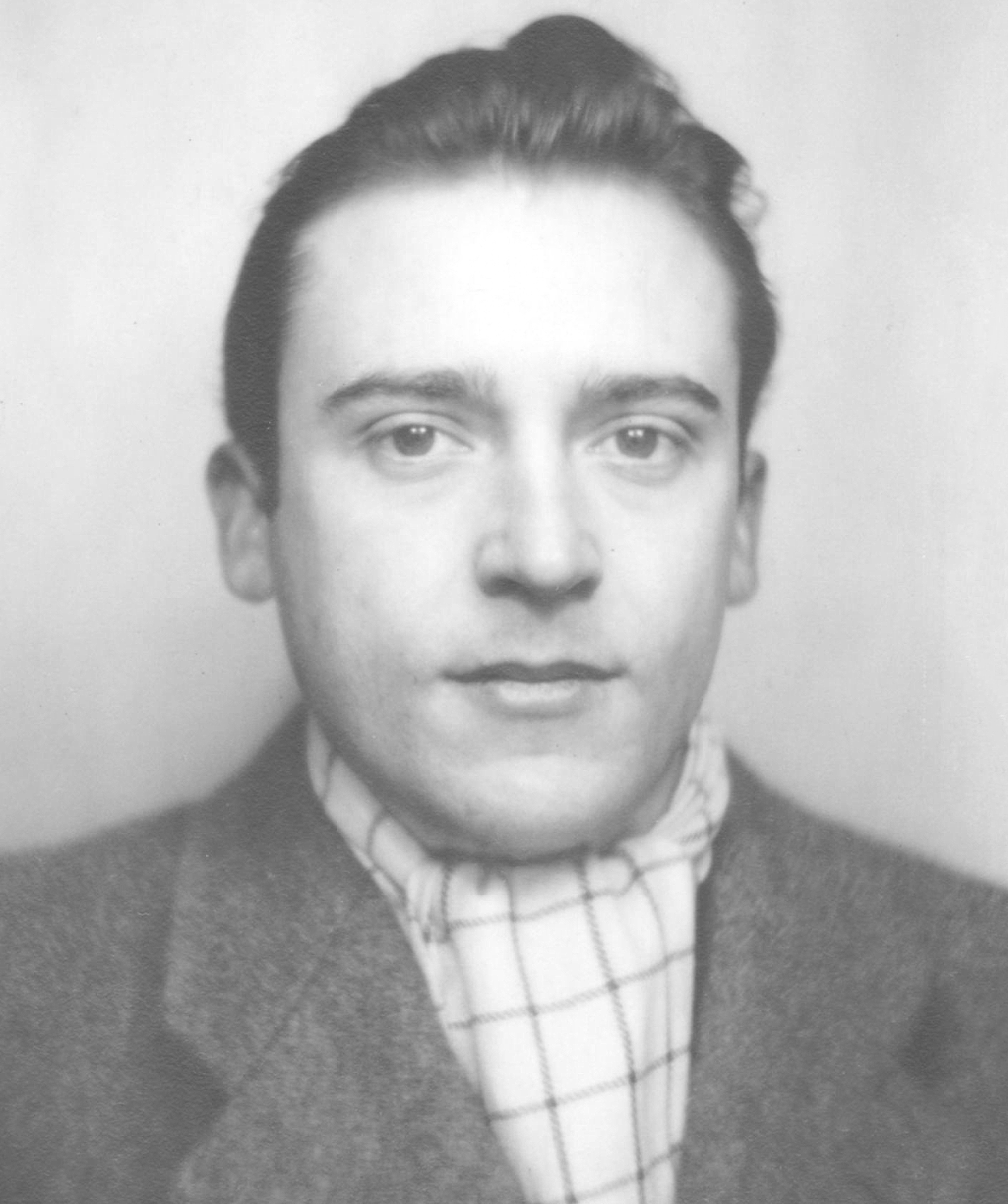
- Jean-Marc Thibault
  Tartarin of Tarascon (1962)
- The Woman Cop (1980)
- Mon Curé Chez les Nudistes (1982)
- Vidocq (2001)
- Mademoiselle Chambon (2009)

== Bibliography ==
- Halliwell, Leslie. Halliwell's Film Guide. Harper & Row, 1989.
