= London Screen =

Late 1960s/early 1970s film distribution company

London Screen was a film distribution company that worked in the late 1960s and early 1970s.

Dimitri de Grunwald had set up a new production and distribution consortium, the International Film Consortium, a co op of independent film distributors throughout the world. They raised finance for a series of films produced by London Screenplays Ltd – The McMasters, Perfect Friday, The Virgin and the Gypsy, The Last Grenade, and Connecting Rooms.

The Winthrop Lawrence Group signed to distribute London Screenplay's films in the US.

The films were financed by raising money from distributors. The financing was underwritten by $24 million in risk money from Morgan Grenfell and Company. Morgan Grenfell later cut off credit to London Screenplays until they were paid back.

London Screenplays Limited went into liquidation in 1975.

== Filmography ==
- Shalako (1968)
- The Girl Couldn't Say No (1968)
- The McMasters (1970)
- Perfect Friday (1970)
- The Virgin and the Gypsy (1971)
- The Last Grenade
- Connecting Rooms (1970)
- A Time for Loving (1971)
- Captain Apache (1971)
- Murphy's War (1971)

=== Unmade Films ===
- adaptation of Brave New World by Milton Sperling
- Chicago 7 based on William P McGivern novel The Seven File (1968)
- comedy thriller Getting Rid of Mr Straker from producer-director Melvin Frank
- Them and Us – a story of student revolution
- A Soldier's Story – story about two teenagers written by Martin Zweilback
