= Perfect Friday =

1970 film by Peter Hall

- Theatrical release poster
- Directed by: Peter Hall
- Screenplay by: Anthony Greville-Bell; C. Scott Forbes
- Story by: C. Scott Forbes
- Produced by: Jack Smith
- Starring: Ursula Andress; Stanley Baker; David Warner
- Cinematography: Alan Hume
- Edited by: Rex Pyke
- Music by: John Dankworth
- Production company: Sunnymede Film Productions
- Distributed by: London Screen
- Release dates: 10 November 1970 (United States); 23 December 1970 (London)
- Running time: 94 minutes
- Country: United Kingdom
- Language: English

Perfect Friday is a 1970 British heist comedy film directed by Peter Hall from a screenplay by Anthony Greville-Bell and C. Scott Forbes, and starring Ursula Andress, Stanley Baker and David Warner. In the film, an audacious plan to rob a bank leads to double-cross.

== Plot ==
Mr. Graham, a deputy under manager in a bank in the West End of London, is dissatisfied with his boring life. He meets Lady Britt Dorset, a spendthrift aristocrat and recruits her and her husband, Lord Nicholas Dorset, to help him carry out his plan to steal £300,000 from the bank. Graham also starts an affair with Lady Dorset.

The plan is to be enacted on a day that the manager absents himself to indulge his passion for golf. With Graham's assistance, Lord Dorset is to pose as a bank inspector there to check the bank's emergency cash reserve, and will substitute counterfeit money for the real money which he will place in Britt's deposit box which she has there as a customer; she will collect the money shortly afterwards, and then they will all take a flight to Switzerland.

Lady Dorset agrees with Graham that they will take a different flight and leave Lord Dorset with nothing, but she also agrees a similar plot with Dorset to cut out Graham.

At the first opportunity, the scheme has to be abandoned when a real bank inspector arrives. When they are able to carry it out, all goes to plan, but Lady Dorset absconds alone with the cash. Graham and Lord Dorset realize that she has double-crossed both of them. They decide to carry out the same plan to rob the bank again the following year.

== Cast ==
- Ursula Andress as Lady Britt Dorset
- Stanley Baker as Mr Graham
- David Warner as Lord Nicholas "Nick" Dorset
- Patience Collier as Nanny
- T. P. McKenna as Smith
- David Waller as Williams
- Joan Benham as Miss Welsh
- Julian Orchard as Thompson
- Trisha Mortimer as Janet
- Anne Tirard as Miss Marsh
- Johnny Briggs as taxi driver
- Fred Griffiths as taxi driver
- Sidney Jennings as taxi driver
- Hugh Halliday as cyclist
- Max Faulkner as strong room guard
- Carleton Hobbs as elderly peer
- Eric Longworth as House of Lords messenger
- Brian Peck as chauffeur
- Howard Lang as bank commissionaire
- Patrick Jordan as bank guard
- Malcolm Johns as Swiss boy friend
- Garfield Morgan as 1st airport official
- Derek Cox as 2nd airport official
- Barbara Ogilvie as woman airport official
- Georgina Simpson as stewardess

== Production ==
Dimitri de Grunwald had set up a new production and distribution consortium, the International Film Consortium, a co-op of independent film distributors throughout the world. They raised finance for a series of films produced by London Screenplays Ltd – The McMasters (1970), Perfect Friday, The Virgin and the Gypsy (1970), The Last Grenade (1970), and Connecting Rooms (1970). De Grunwald described Perfect Friday's commercial prospects as "safe-ish".

The film starred Stanley Baker who later said of it: "I think he [Peter Hall] will produce film work as interesting as what he's done on the stage. ...What I like about Perfect Friday is that everybody lies to each other and everybody believes each other's lies. I don't know if the audience realises it, but every time the characters speak to each other, they're lying." Baker had just appeared in The Last Grenade for de Grunwald.

Peter Hall said the sex scenes "were meant to make fun of all those sex films that steam up the West End."

== Release ==
The film opened at the Odeon Leicester Square in London on 23 December 1970.

== Critical reception ==
Kine Weekly wrote that film "is a cynical puzzle loaded with suspense and topped up with brittle sophisticated humour."

The Monthly Film Bulletin wrote: "Difficult to imagine what attracted Peter Hall to this routine piece of nonsense. ...As in most films centring on a robbery, the ingenuity of the theft itself is the focus of interest, and in this case the preliminaries—which occupy the first half of the film-are fairly tedious in spite of a witty line or two smartly delivered by David Warner. The tension of the actual robbery is reasonably well maintained, but even this fails to interest as much as it should simply because neither director nor players have engaged audience sympathy. This sort of amoral junketing needs immense verve and charm if it is to succeed, but though Peter Hall keeps up a good pace and is helped by a jolly Dankworth score, he lacks the necessary lightness of touch. And his actors, competent though they are, are as charmless a trio as ever robbed a bank."

Writing in the Chicago Tribune, Gene Siskel called the film "special entertainment".
