= Paul Crauchet =

French actor (1920–2012)

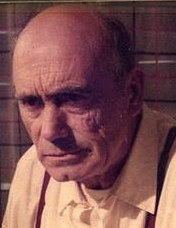
- Born: 14 July 1920; Béziers, France
- Died: 19 December 2012 (aged 92); Nans-les-Pins, France

Paul Crauchet (14 July 1920 – 19 December 2012) was a French actor.

== Biography ==
As a young man interested in aviation and rugby, Paul Crauchet discovered a passion for the theatre at the age of 23. He settled in Paris in 1945, he studied under Charles Dullin for three years and began on stage in 1949. He then worked at the Théâtre National Populaire with Jean Vilar.

Crauchet appeared in the first film by Éric Rohmer, The Sign of Leo, in 1959, and then in 1962 in The War of the Buttons of Yves Robert. It is in The Wise Guys of Robert Enrico in 1965 that he became noticed. He had a very long career during which he worked with many directors, such as Alain Resnais, René Clément, Jean-Pierre Melville, Jacques Deray and José Giovanni. In 1983 he starred in Les Bancals.

== Filmography ==
Year	Title	Role	Notes
1951	Skipper Next to God	Un passager juif	Uncredited
1952	Foyer perdu	Le garçon de café	
1955	Série noire	Le portier du garage	
1956	La Bande à papa	Marcel	
1958	La Moucharde	Le photographe	
1962	War of the Buttons	Touegueule	
1962	Le Signe du Lion	Fred	
1962	À fleur de peau	L'inspecteur	
1965	The Wise Guys	Pélissier	
1966	The War Is Over	Roberto	
1966	Is Paris Burning?	Priest	
1967	Le dimanche de la vie	Poucier	
1967	The Last Adventure	L'assureur	
1967	The Looters	Valdés	
1968	Tante Zita	Dr. Bernard	
1968	Ho!	Gabriel Briand	
1969	La Piscine	Leveque	
1969	Army of Shadows	Felix Lepercq	
1969	Lettres de Stalingrad	Pianist	
1970	Last Known Address	Jacques Loring	
1970	Le Cercle rouge	Le Receleur	
1971	Bof... Anatomie d'un livreur	Paulo / Le père / The father	
1971	The Married Couple of the Year Two	Public Prosecutor	
1971	Without Apparent Motive	Francis Palombo	
1971	Where Did Tom Go ?		
1972	Un flic	Morand	
1973	The Dominici Affair	Le commissaire Sébeil	
1973	Story of a Love Story		
1973	The Burned Barns	Pierre Cateux	
1974	Un nuage entre les dents	Chavignac	
1975	Pas si méchant que ça	L'ivrogne	
1975	The Track	Rollin	
1975	Au-delà de la peur	Inspector	
1975	Flic Story	Paul Robier	
1978	Attention, The Kids Are Watching	Un pêcheur	Uncredited
1978	Le beaujolais nouveau est arrivé	Gaston, le patron du 1er bistrot	
1978	Butterfly on the Shoulder	Raphaël	
1978	The Witness	Le père de Cathy	
1979	Félicité	Le père	
1980	Bobo la tête	Dostoïevski	
1981	La gueule du loup	Commissaire Chailloux	
1983	Les Bancals	Antoine	
1984	Liste noire	Pierre	
1985	Le temps d'un instant	Brice	
1987	La brute	Yves Rodellec	
1988	To Kill a Priest	Alek's Father	
1989	À deux minutes près	Le docteur Gallois	
1990	My Father's Glory	Edmond des Papillons	
1990	My Mother's Castle	Edmond des Papillons	
1990	The King's Whore	Le Duc de Luynes	
1990	Impasse de la vignette	Pa	
1991	Le coup suprême	Smoking	
1991	Venus and Lulu	Pépé Laubépin	
1993	Faut-il aimer Mathilde?	Papy	
1995	Fast	Pépé	
1996	La Belle Verte	Osam	
2007	The Grocer's Son	Le père Clément	
2007	The Merry Widow	Gaby	
2009	Wild Grass	Patient	
