= Christopher Miles =

British film director (1939–2023)

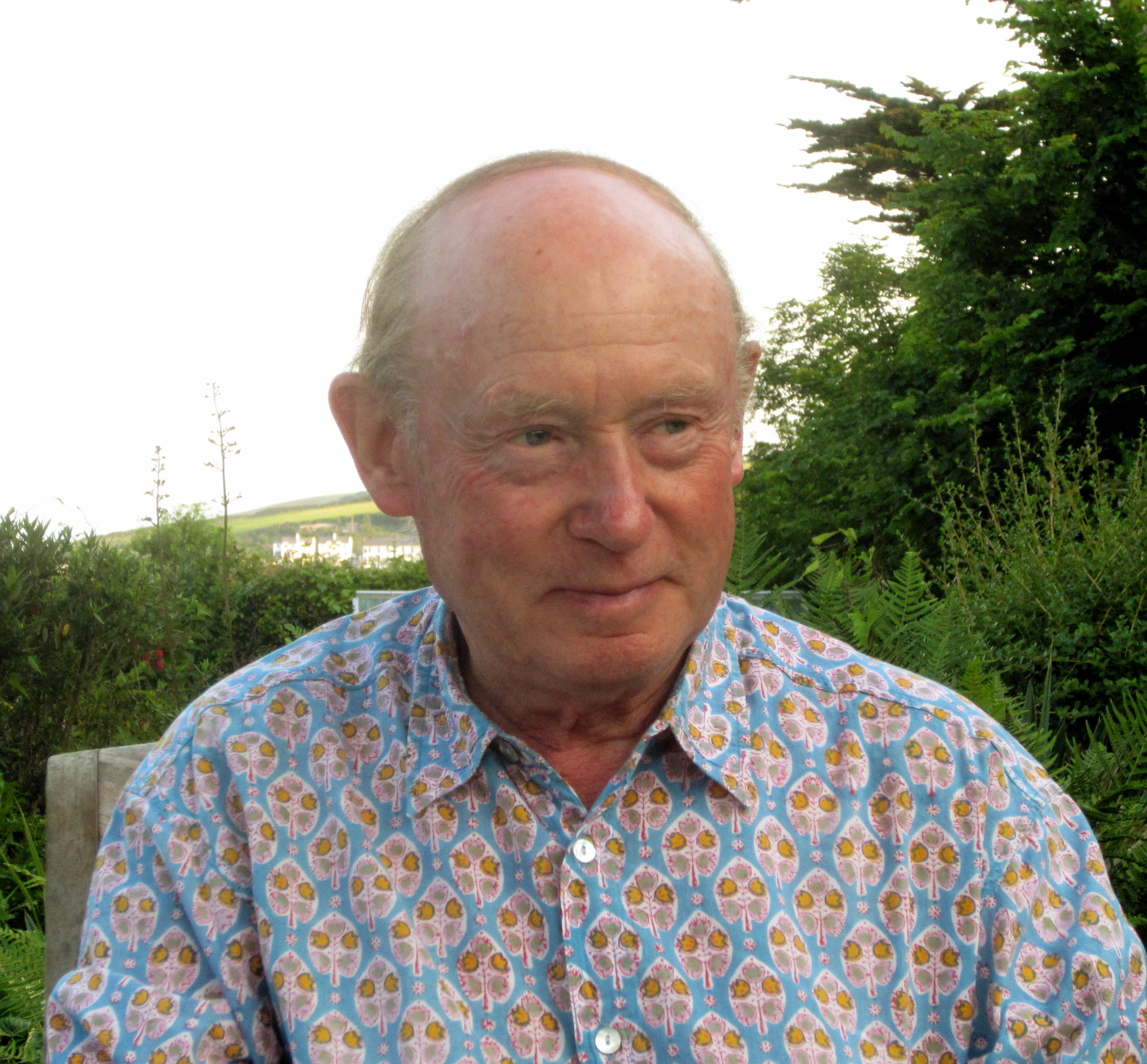
- Miles in 2013
- Born: Christopher John Miles; 19 April 1939; London, England
- Died: 15 September 2023 (aged 84); Devizes, England
- Education: Institut des Hautes Études Cinématographiques, Paris
- Occupations: Film director, producer and writer
- Years active: 1962–2023
- Spouse: Susan Helen Howard Armstrong (m. 1967)
- Children: 1
- Relatives: Sarah Miles (sister)

Christopher Miles (19 April 1939 – 15 September 2023) was a British film director, producer and screenwriter.

== Personal life ==
Christopher Miles was born in London, England, the eldest of four children to Clarice Remnant (‘Wren’), a councillor, and John Miles, a consulting engineer, whose family had been in the steel industry for several generations. The names of two railway promoters named Miles are on a plaque in Yarm commemorating the centenary of the Stockton and Darlington Railway.

At age 16, while still at Winchester College (1953–57), Miles became the first person to show 8mm film on television (6 April 1957), at the invitation of the BBC’s children’s programme All Your Own. During this time he helped produce and write a variety entertainment, The Begmilian Show, in which his sister Sarah Miles first performed publicly.

At age 19, under suspicion of being a spy, he was imprisoned in Communist China for filming in Qinhuangdao. In fact he was making his first commissioned film for the owner of the Silver Line, and was released from prison after 20 hours of non-stop questioning. Miles' film footage, which was some of the first from behind the ‘Bamboo Curtain', was later sold to Movietone News.

After six months at Stewarts & Lloyds Steel Works in Corby, he decided to study film direction at the Institut des Hautes Études Cinématographiques (1961–62) in Paris. During the summer vacation, he wrote and directed A Vol d'Oiseau (1962) a half-hour film, which was shown at Studio 28, a Parisian cinema.

In 1967 Miles married the painter Suzy Armstrong in Chelsea, where they lived until 1993 when they moved to Wiltshire. Their daughter Sophie is a painter and potter. In 2009 Miles organized and raised funds for the restoration of the 1707 Royal Coat of Arms, in their local church.

Miles was Patron of the Christopher Marlowe Society, and helped raise money in 2002 for a window in Westminster Abbey in memory of the great Elizabethan poet and playwright. He was also Vice President of the D. H. Lawrence Society; as well as a committee member of Marbles Reunited, which was created to reunite the sculptures taken from the Parthenon temple in Athens by Lord Elgin.

From her mother Clarice Remnant's father Francis Remnant, Sarah Miles claims to be the great-granddaughter of Prince Francis of Teck and thus a second cousin once removed of Queen Elizabeth II.

Miles died of cancer in Devizes on 15 September 2023, at the age of 84.

== Career ==
Due to ‘A Vol d’Oiseau’ Miles was able to persuade the Boulting Brothers to part finance his first 35mm project The Six-Sided Triangle (1963), which he wrote, directed and co-produced. The film was nominated for an Academy Award.

After joining the Grade Organization, Leslie Grade asked Miles to write and direct a film for The Shadows pop group. Rhythm ‘n Greens (1964) which was distributed as a supporting feature throughout the ABC Cinemas circuit. Grade then offered Miles his first feature film, Up Jumped a Swagman (1965) a surrealist musical comedy. At 26, Miles became the youngest feature director working in England, which position he held for another five years.

Attracted to the French attitude to the cinema, and their ways of life, Miles made the Rue Lepic Slow Race (1967), and also filmed an original Jean Anouilh screenplay A Time for Loving (1971) and later Jean Genet’s The Maids (1975) for the American Film Theatre. The Maids was shown out of competition at Cannes in 1975.

In 1969 he directed The Virgin and the Gypsy based on the D. H. Lawrence novella, which was voted the best film by both the British Critics Circle and the New York Press, and was nominated for a Golden Globe in 1970. It ran for 18 months in London’s West End and broke Box Office records in New York and established his reputation. The film, a Dimitri de Grunwald production, was screened at Cannes in 1970, but wasn't entered into the main competition.

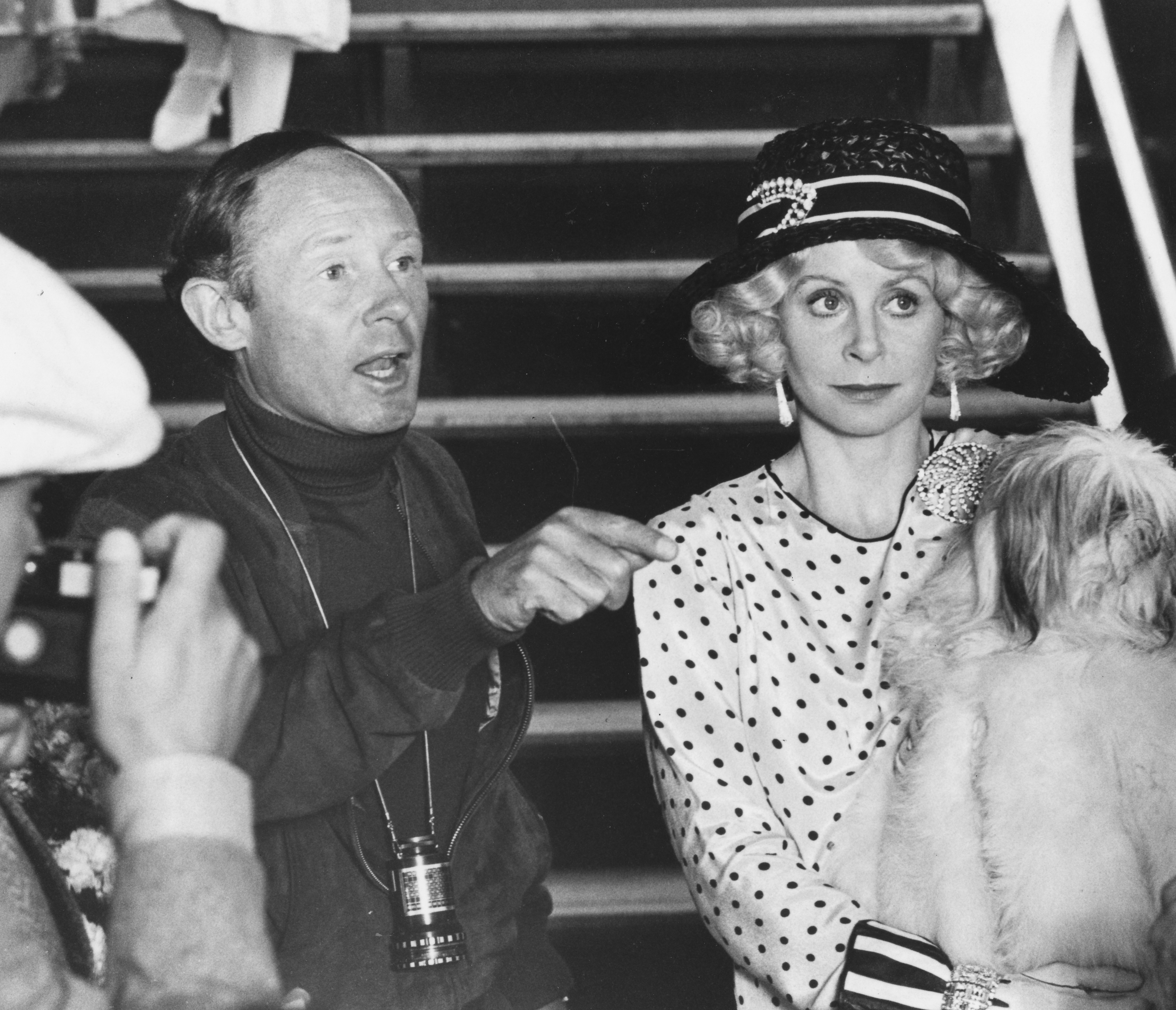
Christopher Miles directs his sister Sarah Miles in 1980

As their film project on another D.H.Lawrence project 'The Plumed Serpent’ was postponed, Miles and his sister Sarah Miles could commit to do a theatre production in Chicago. The Chicago theatre producer David Lonn asked Miles and his sister Sarah to choose a play; They chose Thornton Wilder’s comedy ‘Skin of our Teeth’ (1972), in which Miles directed both theatre and film-in-the-round.

The same year the BBC arts program Full House asked Miles to join other directors outside the BBC to make half hour films of short stories from James Joyce or Anton Chekhov. Miles chose Chekhov’s Zinotchka (1972), which was adapted by Melvyn Bragg with Charlotte Rampling in the title role.

Jean Genet’s The Maids (1975) was directed by Miles who co-wrote the screenplay and filmed it in 10 days with Glenda Jackson, Susannah York and Vivien Merchant for the American Film Theatre. It was shown out of competition in the newly created ‘Yeux Fertiles’ section at Cannes in 1975.

A satire on the Common Market brought Miles and Dimitri de Grunwald together again for That Lucky Touch (1976) which was fully financed from European sources with de Grunwald's European Film Consortium.

David Ambrose the writer, decided with Miles to re-work the plot of a script he had with Anglia Television as if it was a documentary. Alternative 3 (1977) caused a scandal with its supposed landings on Mars and prescient climate-change forebodings and was banned in the USA. Anglia's chairman Sir John Woolf, after the success of the film's worldwide sales, offered Miles the first of the Tales of the Unexpected, then introduced by Roald Dahl. In "Neck" (1978) Sir John Gielgud was cast as a butler for the first time.

Eager to return to his idea for a film on the life of D.H.Lawrence, Miles collaborated again with writer Alan Plater. Eventually a financier was found to back the project which had Ian McKellen in the lead. ‘Priest of Love’ (1981) was filmed in Cornwall, Nottingham, Oaxaca, Florence, and France in the houses where Lawrence actually wrote, painted and died. The film opened the London and the San Diego Film Festivals in 1981.

While waiting for Melina Mercouri and ERT/Greek National Television to give him the go-ahead for his script on how Lord Elgin acquired the marbles from the Parthenon, he made three documentaries with Greek connections. Daley’s Decathlon’ (1982) in which Daley Thompson not only won the event, but broke the World Record enabling Miles to get the best film existing of the first athlete in history to hold European, Commonwealth and Olympic Gold medals simultaneously. Then Miles co-wrote and directed the ‘Marathon’ (1983) for Channel 4, and ‘Aphrodisias - city of Aphrodite’ (1984). Finally Jules Dassin, (Melina Mercouri’s husband) cleared the way for the docu-drama of ‘Lord Elgin and Some Stones of No Value’ (1985) to begin shooting on the Acropolis.

On condition that Miles could continue making films, he accepted the Royal College of Art's invitation to run the Film and Television courses as Professor of Film and Television (1989–1993). However the promise proved unworkable, but the talented post-graduate students' films won the Fuji Prize twice during this period and were also televised.

In 1997 Miles embarked on a 3-hour television series ‘Love in the Ancient World’ (1998), for which he also wrote a book on the subject, illustrated with his own photographs, as well as directing and co-producing the series. Filming took place over most of the Mediterranean basin, and in many European museums. Plato’s ‘Symposium’ was also enacted. This section was only broadcast by Bayerischer Rundfunk in Germany, but not in the US by A&E, where Kathleen Turner hosted a 2-hour version of the program.

The 18th-century Stanway House in Gloucestershire provided the setting for Miles’ film version of the David Garrick and George Coleman's comedy of the ′Clandestine Marriage’ (2000) to a successful finale, which was completed in six weeks despite the producers' momentary lapse in funding.

On 4 and 5 June 2010 the oldest cinema in Paris, Studio 28 in Montmartre, had a retrospective “Un Anglais de Paris" of 4 of Miles’ films with French connections.

To celebrate the 28th Olympiad in Athens, Miles teamed up with ERT TV in Greece again, to examine the myths and truths of the modern Games in ‘Fire from Olympia’ (2004), which was re-edited and distributed as a DVD in 2012 for the London Olympics.

== Publications ==
Alternative 3 - based on the TV film by David Ambrose & Christopher Miles written by Leslie Watkins First published Sphere Books Ltd (UK) - (1978) Reprinted (1980) ISBN 0-380-44677-4

Subsequently, published in Athens, Greece by Konidarin Press (1978) -USA Avon Books (1979) - Spain Ediciones Martinez Roca SA (1980) - Japan by Tama Publishing Co. Ltd., (1981) Reprinted (1990) – also see ‘Casebook on Alternative 3’ by Jim Keith

‘Love in the Ancient World’ written by Christopher Miles with John Julius Norwich First published by Weidenfeld & Nicolson UK (1997) ISBN 0-297-83586-6

Subsequently, published by St Martin's Press New York (1997) ‘Liebe in der Antike’ -VGS, Cologne, Germany (1997) Reprinted in paperback by Seven Dials UK (1998)

== Filmography ==
- A Vol d'Oiseau (1962)
- The Six-Sided Triangle (1963)
- Rhythm 'n' Greens (1964)
- Up Jumped a Swagman (1965)
- Rue Lepic Slow Race (1967)
- The Virgin and the Gypsy (1970)
- A Time for Loving (1971)
- Zinotchka - TV (1972)
- The Maids (1974)
- That Lucky Touch (1975)
- Alternative 3 - TV (1977)
- Neck TV (1978)
- Priest of Love (1981)
- Daley's Decathlon - TV (1982)
- Marathon - TV (1983)
- Aphrodisias - City of Aphrodite - TV (1984)
- Lord Elgin and Some Stones of No Value - TV (1986)
- Cyclone Warning Class 4 - TV (1994)
- Love in the Ancient World - TV 3x1hr (1997)
- The Clandestine Marriage (2000)
- Fire from Olympia - TV (2004)

== Awards ==
- San Francisco Film Festival USA - Best Live Action Short (nom) 1963 - A Vol d’Oiseau’
- Academy Awards USA - Best live action short (nom) 1963 - Six-sided Triangle
- Taormina International Film Fest - Best Film (nom) 1970 - The Virgin & The Gypsy
- British Film and Television Press Guild - Won Best Film 1971 - The Virgin & The Gypsy
- 29th Golden Globe Awards USA - Best English Language Foreign Film (nom) 1971 - The Virgin & The Gypsy
- National Board of Review USA - Won Best film for 1971 - The Virgin & The Gypsy
- Laurel Awards - Stars of Tomorrow (nom) Joanna Shimkus 1971 - The Virgin & The Gypsy
- Laurel Awards - Stars of Tomorrow (nom) Franco Nero 1971 - The Virgin & The Gypsy
- UK Video Awards - (Runner Up) - 1983 - Dailey's Decathlon
- Newport Beach Film Festival - Won Best Cinematography 2000 - The Clandestine Marriage

== Theatre ==
- Skin of Our Teeth (1973)

== Related books ==
- The English Novel and the Movies - Gontarski, S.E. (Ed. Michael Klein & Gilian Parker) Frederick Ungar Publishing Co /New York - "The Virgin and the Gypsy" - An English Watercolor ISBN 0-8044-2472-1
- D.H.Lawrence - Fifty Years on Film - Greiff, Louis K. (Southern Illinois University Press) 'Foxes and Gypsies on Film' ISBN 0-8093-2387-7
- 30 Ans de Cinéma Britannique - Raymond Lefevre & Roland Lacourbe, (presse de la Sipe) - editions cinema 76 ISBN 2-902292-00-7
- Cinema in Britain - Butler, Ivan (South Brunswick and New York: A.S.Barnes & Company London: The Tantivy Press) ISBN 0-498-01133-X
- Young Meteors - Aitkin, Jonathan (Martin Secker & Warburg (1967) Pages 241, 242) ISBN 1-909-50209-X
