= Mike Baldwin =

Mike or Michael Baldwin may refer to:

- Mike Baldwin (Coronation Street), a fictional character in the British soap opera
- Mike Baldwin (motorcyclist) (born 1955), American motorcycle road racer
- A. Michael Baldwin (born 1963), American actor, producer and screenwriter
- Michael Baldwin (The Young and the Restless), fictional character in The Young and the Restless
- Michael Baldwin (designer) (?–2014), British designer
- Michael Baldwin (artist) (born 1945), British conceptual artist, member and co-founder of Art & Language
