= Venus and Lulu =

- Promotional still of the naked woman waking up in rural Provence. The depiction of the lush countryside was well received by critics.
- French: La Vénus à Lulu
- Directed by: Daniel Losset
- Written by: Daniel Losset
- Starring: Caroline Laurence; Maxime Boidron
- Music by: Serge Franklin
- Production companies: Canal+; France 3; Les Productions Dussart
- Release date: May 11, 1991
- Running time: 90 minutes
- Country: France
- Language: French

Venus and Lulu (French: La Vénus à Lulu, lit. 'Lulu's Venus') is a 1991 French comedy television film written and directed by Daniel Losset, and produced by Canal+, France 3, and Les Productions Dussart. It stars Caroline Laurence as a sleepwalking Finnish woman who is stranded without clothes while traveling in rural Provence in France, and Maxime Boidron as Lulu, a mischievous boy who tries to help her find clothes without drawing attention, while the bustling village prepares for a wedding and Bastille Day.

Losset originally pitched the film to TF1, which rejected it as network executives thought it would be impossible to make a movie where a woman stays nude for the entire runtime. When the pitch instead was approved by Canal+ and France 3, Losset immediately left his position as assistant director of fiction at France 2 to work on the film, in what he described as a hectic production, consisting of 30 days of pre-production and 26 days of filming. Critics enjoyed the film's premise and humor, its lush country setting, and its characters – particularly finding the mischievous child characters believable, and the naked woman beautiful – but some criticized it as too slowly paced. The film premiered on Canal+ on May 11, 1991, and on France 3 on January 7, 1992, and aired in a few other European countries in the following years.

== Plot ==
A Finnish woman travels through southeastern France with her husband, sleeping naked in their caravan while he drives. When he stops to change a tire, she sleepwalks out of the caravan and along the road, and he drives away without noticing, leaving her stranded in rural Provence without clothes. She wakes up confused, and hides in the thicket after being seen by a passing driver, who begins to believe he is hallucinating.

A nearby village bustles with activity as it prepares for a wedding and Bastille Day celebrations, and a television crew shoots a film while a group of mischievous children watches, including a boy named Lulu, the grandson of one of the actors. Lulu discovers the naked woman in the thicket, and despite the language barrier, she conveys that she needs to find her husband and something to wear, and that she wants to avoid being seen naked in the process. Lulu takes her to the village, sneaking through the streets to avoid being seen by his aunt and other townsfolk, and hides her in the hayloft of his family's barn. He leaves to find clothes for her while she takes a nap, but takes a detour to impress his friends by showing them the naked woman. They do not believe him, and only one comes along; after confirming the story, they return to convince the rest. Meanwhile, the woman's husband notices her absence and contacts the police, who, excited about the prospect of searching for naked women, dispatch several cars and helicopters.

The woman falls off the loft while sleepwalking, and is discovered by Lulu's father. He helps her hide, causing Lulu's aunt to think he has hired a sex worker; they argue, which prevents him from returning to the barn with clothes for the woman. Lulu and his friends arrive at the now-empty hayloft, and they think he was lying. Alone, he again encounters the naked woman, and they sneak through the village together, looking for clothes and a hiding place. In the process, she is spotted by surprised villagers: rumors of a nude woman wandering the streets spread, prompting the bakery to start making bread in the shape of naked women. A large group of villagers eventually walks in on the woman while she hides in one of Lulu's friends' homes, and the police are notified of her whereabouts. She is reunited with her husband, and they are made the guests of honor of the wedding. While watching the news in the hospital, the man who thought he experienced hallucinations learns of the events, and realizes he is well after all. The children inflate a balloon depicting a naked woman, and release it into the sky.

== Cast ==
- Caroline Laurence as a naked Finnish woman prone to sleepwalking
- Maxime Boidron as Lulu, a mischievous and inventive boy
- Richard Martin as Lulu's father
- Annick Cisaruk as Lulu's aunt
- Paul Crauchet as Pépé Laubépin, Lulu's grandfather
- Philippe Gouinguenet as the naked woman's absent-minded husband

== Production ==
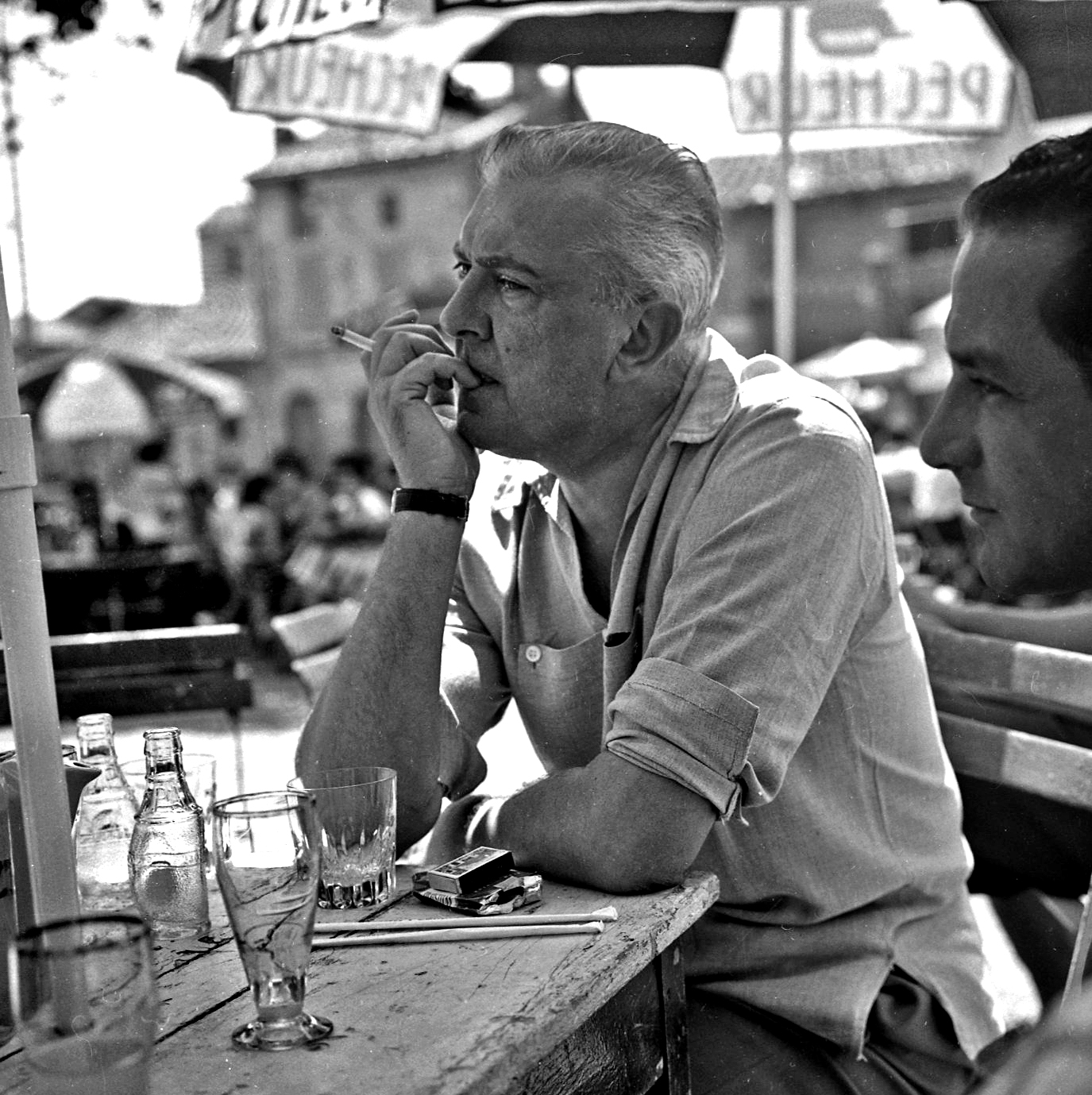
Losset cited the filmmaker Jacques Tati as one of the influences on Venus and Lulu.

The movie's director and writer, Daniel Losset, first pitched Venus and Lulu to the French television network TF1, who was looking to commission a comedy movie, but it was rejected as the network executives thought it would be "impossible" to produce a film in which the female lead is naked for the entire 90-minute runtime. Losset characterized them as unexpectedly prudish, saying that his intent was to create soft sexual comedy, not pornography.

Still believing in his idea, Losset then pitched it to Canal+ and France 3; he learned that they had agreed to co-produce the movie while he was working as assistant director of fiction for France 2, a position he immediately resigned from to write and direct Venus and Lulu at Les Productions Dussart. He described his goal as simply providing entertainment for a broad audience, themed around "the mysterious threshold" one crosses when growing up. He cited several influences, including the writers Marcel Aymé and Jean L'Hôte, the filmmaker Jacques Tati, the composer Charles Trenet, Louis Pergaud's novel War of the Buttons, and the concept of naïve art; some of these, such as Tati's 1949 comedy film Jour de fête, were directly referenced.

Losset found the production hectic: the schedule allowed for 30 days of pre-production, and 26 for filming. Casting, directed by Charlotte Dautcourt and Max Morel, was done in the middle of August; Losset described it as difficult to find an intelligent and skilled actress capable of performing nude, an actor who could convincingly portray a Finnish man eccentric enough to lose his wife, and child actors who could give a natural performance. Location scouting was also a challenge, as he, in addition to finding an appropriate village and barn, needed to obtain permission from the local priest and mayor to film a naked woman wandering the streets. He commented that he wished they had not chosen locations so far apart, as they had to rush back and forth between them. The original score for the movie was composed by Serge Franklin, who had been prolific as a composer for French television productions ever since 1978.

== Release and reception ==
Venus and Lulu premiered in France on May 11, 1991, on the pay television channel Canal+, and had its free-to-air debut on January 7, 1992, on France 3. In the years following, it also aired in a few other European countries: in Poland as Lulu i jego Wenus ("Lulu and His Venus") on TV2 on July 9, 1992, in Hungary as Lülü Vénusza ("Lulu's Venus") on TV1 on March 23, 1994, and in Sweden as En livs levande Venus ("A Venus in the Flesh") on TV3 on December 24, 1996.

Critics enjoyed the film's core concept of a naked woman sneaking through a village; Le Monde called it a funny and successful conceit, that they had thought it risky to hinge a whole movie on. Christian Bosséno, reviewing the film for the Cinémaction book Télévision française : la saison 1992, called it a straight-forward film, and enjoyed how it creates quaint humor from the woman trying to avoid being seen naked, a concept he considered highly original, although did think that it never felt fully believable. Isabelle Pia, writing for L'Événement du jeudi, found the concept enjoyable, just not laugh-out-loud funny, and described it as a charming and high-quality television film. The essayist András Fodor watched it on its Hungarian premiere, and gave it a "medium" score of 3 of 5. (Note: In Fodor's scoring system, a 1 is the best, and 5 the worst.) Bosséno and Le Monde liked how the premise was handled, saying that it despite being about a naked woman avoided excessive use of "cheap titillation", and managed to not feel vulgar; Télé 7 Jours described it as appropriate for both adults and teenagers.

Bosséno praised the film for not only focusing on comedy, but also including social observations of village life and depictions of nature, with a poetic and unusual atmosphere; Pia, similarly, described it as having poetic undertones beneath its whimsy; and Le Monde appreciated it for avoiding excessive sentimental and for its handling of "high-risk subjects" like humor, sexuality, and childhood. Whereas Pia called the direction of the film "well-executed", Le Monde criticized it for moving too slowly; Bosséno, describing the film as impressionistic in style, said that the slow pacing at times makes the plot "come apart", and that it would benefit from more dynamic direction. Télé 7 Jours, on the other hand, thought the gags throughout the film prevented the viewer from getting bored. Critics also enjoyed the French countryside setting, with Pia and Bosséno calling it bright and visually appealing.

The acting and characters were well received: Le Monde thought that Laurence and Boidron carried the film as the naked woman and Lulu, with their rapport being key to the story's believability; Télé 7 Jours considered Lulu the heart of the movie. Bosséno particularly mentioned being impressed with the child characters' believability, through being written as realistically mischievous "little devils" rather than well-behaved angels, and called the child actors "well-directed"; Télé 7 Jours called their performance natural, Pia found them endearing, and Le Monde noted that while it can be difficult to work with child actors, they had struck the right balance between innocence and mischief to feel realistic. Głos Pomorza and Télé 7 Jours both also highlighted the naked woman's appearance, describing her as "beautiful", "stunning", and "natural".
