= Jess Hahn =

American actor (1921–1998)

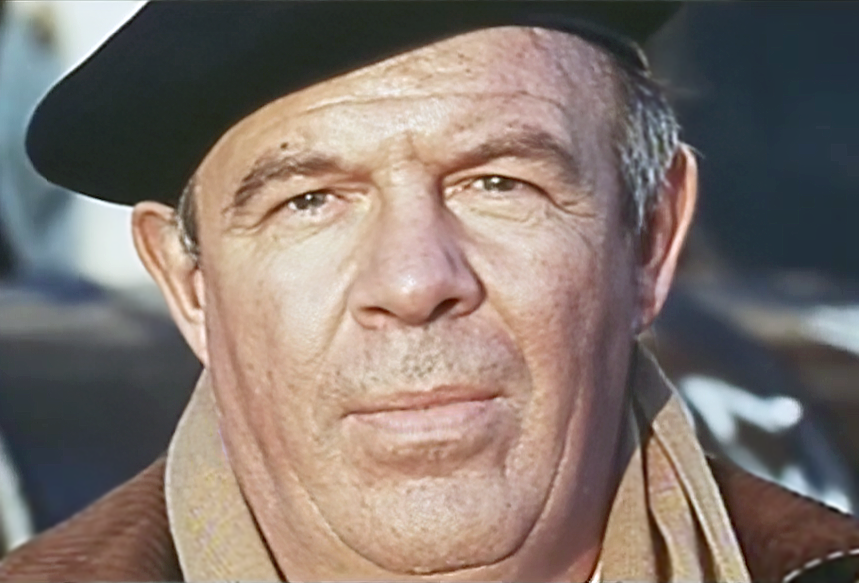
- Born: Jesse Beryle Hahn; October 29, 1921; Terre Haute, Indiana, U.S.
- Died: June 29, 1998 (aged 76); Saint-Malo, France
- Education: Murray State University
- Occupation: Actor
- Years active: 1953–1989
- Military career
- Allegiance: United States
- Branch: United States Army
- Conflicts: World War II; Operation Overlord

Jesse Beryle Hahn (October 29, 1921 – June 29, 1998) was an American actor. He spent the majority of his career as a popular character actor in French cinema, typically playing physically imposing roles, gangsters, or military men. He also played the lead character in the French New Wave film Le Signe du Lion (1962), directed by Éric Rohmer.

== Early life ==
Hahn was born in Terre Haute, Indiana and attended Murray State University in Kentucky, earning degrees in English and physical education. It was also during this time that he began studying the French language. During the Second World War, Hahn served in the U.S. Army, mainly as a physical instructor. He participated in Operation Overlord.

In 1949, Hahn moved to Paris, where he worked as a jazz musician before embarking on an acting career. He shortened his first name to "Jess", because it was easier to pronounce in French.

== Career ==
Hahn made his film debut in La môme vert-de-gris (1953), starring Eddie Constantine as Lemmy Caution. His imposing frame, American-inflected French, and "bulldog" face led him to play all manner of supporting characters in crime dramas, film noirs, and westerns. Hahn often appeared in "strong man" roles, such as in Cartouche and Topkapi, or as gangsters.

Seen mostly as a character actor in French films, he played a rare leading role in Éric Rohmer's The Sign of Leo.

Hahn also worked in the theatre. He made his stage debut in The Love of Four Colonels at the Théâtre Fontaine in 1954, directed by Jean-Pierre Grenier. In 1968, he starred in a French touring production of The Odd Couple.

Later in his career, Hahn was regularly employed by French exploitation director Jean-Marie Pallardy, until his retirement in 1989. His final acting role was in another Constantine-Caution vehicle, the made-for-television film Le retour de Lemmy Caution.

== Personal life ==
Throughout out his career, Hahn was sometimes confused with Billy Kearns, another American expatriate actor. The two were friends in real life. He also had close friendships with actor Jean Rochefort and painter Geoffroy Dauvergne.

In his latter years, Hahn obtained French citizenship and resided on a farm in Dinard with his wife Marcelline, a radiologist.

=== Death ===
Hahn died in Saint-Malo on 29 June 1998, aged 76. His ashes were scattered at Pointe du Décollé, in Saint-Lunaire and the road leading to his home was renamed Rue Jess-Hahn.

== Partial filmography ==
- Deux de l'escadrille (1953)
- La môme vert-de-gris (1953) - Le marin-geôlier
- The Most Wanted Man (1953) - Walter le Vicieux, un truand
- Act of Love (1953) - Un soldat (uncredited)
- The Pirates of the Bois de Boulogne (1954) - Le marin américain
- Father Brown - Minor Role (uncredited)
- Ça va barder (1955) - Un Marin Américain au 'Paradise' (uncredited)
- L'impossible Monsieur Pipelet (1955) - Jerome K. Smith, l'américain
- Girl on the Third Floor (1955) - L'Américain (uncredited)
- Tant qu'il y aura des femmes (1955)
- Madelon (1955) - Le général américain Gibson
- Les Hussards (1955) - Un hussard (uncredited)
- The Best Part (1955) - Karl - un mineur
- Meeting in Paris (1956) - Henry
- Ces sacrées vacances (1956) - Richard Brown - l'Américain
- Fernand cow-boy (1956) - Jim Harlan, Saloon manager
- The Lebanese Mission (1956) - Le valet
- The Happy Road (1957) - MP Sgt. Morgan
- Le colonel est de la revue (1957) - Jess
- Action immédiate (1957) - Kalpannen
- The Vintage (1957) - André Morel (uncredited)
- Let's Be Daring, Madame (1957) - Edward Butterfield dit 'Eddy'
- Send a Woman When the Devil Fails (1957) - La Couture
- Le triporteur (1957) - Daniel (uncredited)
- Nathalie (1957) - Sam
- Le désert de Pigalle (1958) - Bill
- Chéri, fais-moi peur (1958) - Chris Craft, L'espion américain
- Le Sicilien (1958) - Raffles
- Time Bomb (1959) - Le marin blessé
- The Tiger Attacks (1959) - Donald
- La femme et le Pantin (1959) - Sidney
- The Sahara Is Burning (1961) - Jeff Gordon
- The Big Gamble (1961) - First Mate
- Dynamite Jack (1961) - Sergeant Bob
- Cartouche (1962) - La Douceur
- The Sign of Leo (1962) - Pierre Wesselrin
- Mon oncle du Texas (1962) - Brad
- Mandrin (1962) - Bertrand le braco
- The Trial (1962) - Second Assistant Inspector
- Une blonde comme ça (1963) - Sam
- People in Luck (1963) - Un chauffeur de taxi (segment "Le repas gastronomique") (uncredited)
- Verspätung in Marienborn (1963) - Sgt. Torre
- Que personne ne sorte (1964) - Bugsy Weis
- Topkapi (1964) - Hans Fisher
- The Great Spy Chase (1964) - Le Commodore O'Brien
- The Gorillas (1964) - Boris, Alexis Alexevitch, le maquilleur
- Cent briques et des tuiles (1965) - Palmoni
- What's New Pussycat? (1965) - Mr. Werner
- The Wise Guys (1965) - Nénesse
- Up to His Ears (1965) - Cornelius Ponchabert
- Secret Agent Super Dragon (1966) - Baby Face
- The Mona Lisa Has Been Stolen (1966) - Fêtard, le milliardaire noctambule
- Le facteur s'en va-t-en guerre (1966) - Jess Parker
- The Saint Lies in Wait (1966) - Hoppy Uniatz
- Triple Cross (1966) - Commander Braid
- L'homme qui valait des milliards (1967) - Henry
- The Crazy Kids of the War (1967) - Maj. Bill Hocks
- Your Turn to Die (1967) - Boris
- Le démoniaque (1968) - Floyd Delaney
- The Fuller Report (1968) - Eddy Bennet
- The Night of the Following Day (1969) - Friendly
- L'ardoise (1970) - Bob Daniels
- Atlantic Wall (1970) - Le colonel anglais
- Les Novices (1970) - L'Américain
- Laisse aller... c'est une valse (1971) - Congo
- Captain Apache (1971) - Father Rodriguez (uncredited)
- Boulevard du Rhum (1971) - Piet aka "Big Dutch"
- Bad Man's River (1971) - Tom Odie
- L'ingénu (1972) - Le capitaine
- Decameron proibitissimo (Boccaccio mio statte zitto) (1972) - Prior (uncredited)
- The Sicilian Connection (1972) - Sacha
- The Grand Duel (1972) - Bighorse the Stagecoach Driver
- La isla misteriosa y el capitán Nemo (1973) - Bonaventure Pencroft
- Mean Frank and Crazy Tony (1973) - Jeannot
- Three Tough Guys (1974) - The Bartender
- Un linceul n'a pas de poches (1974) - Walter
- The Man from Chicago (1975) - Jeff
- Jackpot (1975)
- Le point de mire (1977) - Général Harris
- Johnny West (1977) - Manager
- State Reasons (1978) - agent de la CIA
- Mama Dracula (1980) - Le commissaire
- Teheran 43 (1981) - Second Terrorist
- Par où t'es rentré? On t'a pas vu sortir (1984) - Mac Douglas
- Vivre pour survivre (1985) - Sam
- La galette du roi (1986) - Morrisson - un réalisateur TV
- Overdose (1987) - The Doctor
