= Dimitri de Grunwald =

Russian-born British film producer (1914–1990)

Dimitri de Grunwald (born 1914 in Saint Petersburg, Russia, died 26 May 1990 at Hove, England) was a Russian-born British film producer, and the brother of producer Anatole de Grunwald.

The two brothers assisted in the production of several films of Anthony Asquith. In 1960 Dimitri co-produced the Peter Sellers and Sophia Loren film The Millionairess (1960).

In 1967 Dimitri pioneered the idea of raising funds for film productions by selling territorial distribution rights in advance, to consortia of film distributors from various nations.

== Filmography ==
- The Millionairess (1960)
- The Dock Brief a.k.a. Trial and Error (1962)
- Stranger in the House (1967)
- Shalako (1968)
- Perfect Friday (1970)
- The McMasters (1970)
- The Virgin and the Gypsy (1970)
- Connecting Rooms (1970)
- The Last Grenade (1970)
- Murphy's War (1971)
- The God King (1974)
- That Lucky Touch (1975)
- A Time for Loving (1975)
