= The Six-Sided Triangle =

- Directed by: Christopher Miles
- Written by: Christopher Miles
- Produced by: Christopher Miles; Sara Bennett
- Starring: Sarah Miles; Nicol Williamson; Bill Meilen
- Cinematography: David Watkin
- Edited by: Peter Musgrave
- Music by: Michael Dress
- Release date: 1963
- Running time: 30 minutes
- Country: United Kingdom
- Languages: English, Italian, French

The Six-Sided Triangle is a 1963 British short film written and directed by Christopher Miles and produced with Sara Bennett. It parodies a favourite theme of the cinema - the eternal triangle - and shows how six countries might deal with the moment a husband returns home unexpectedly to find his wife with a lover, with Sarah Miles, Nicol Williamson and Bill Meilen. It was a seminal short film which broke through the Rank/ABPC distribution cartels and was theatrically released by British Lion and world-wide by Lion International, and nominated for an Academy Award.

== Plot ==
Using the eternal triangle as the main theme, the film shows how six countries might deal with the moment a husband returns home unexpectedly to find his wife with a lover, with the same three actors playing all the roles. The film also parodies the well known styles of the prominent directors and stars of each country at the time the film was made.

As this theme was first explored by the silent cinema, it begins with desert sheiks, tents, Persian brocades and an Arab husband's revenge, however the English are less hot- blooded with rain stopping the cricket, and a compromise over a whisky. The Japanese resort to harakiri unable to stomach American intervention, and the Italian stilted subtitles misinterpret the lover's hot-bloodied feelings with "I admire your bust" and the husband's anger with "I should never have married a Neapolitan lady of the town!".

The Swedes are silent in their snow-bound house, as the ticking handless clock fails to tell the time in the pervading gloom, as they carry on with their infidelities even after poison and wild strawberries are consumed, whereas the French New Wave and excessive hand- held cameras follow a lover's search for a cigarette, and where 'ça va?' seems to cover most emotions until a surprise ending.

== Cast ==
- Sarah Miles as the Wife
- Nicol Williamson as the Lover
- Bill Meilen as the Husband

== Production ==
The idea for The Six-sided Triangle came to Christopher Miles when studying at the Institut des hautes études cinématographiques in Paris. As it became clear to Miles that when the same script was given to several film students of different nationalities, they all ended up directing very different films, clearly showing the influence of a director's interpretation of a script.

After making a short film 'A Vol d'Oiseau' with other film students in Paris in the holidays, Miles showed it along with the script for "The Six-sided Triangle" to the man in charge of distributing short films, Beresford Seligman, at British Lion in London. John and Roy Boulting, two of the company's directors, liked the script and were willing to put up £1,000 towards the £6,000 total budget, leaving Miles and his co-producer Sara Bennett to find the rest.

The Boulting Brothers helped Miles form a company by taking over a defunct one in British Lion files - The Archers - once owned by Michael Powell and Emeric Pressburger, which became Milesian Film Productions Ltd and later trades under Milesian Lion.

The director's sister Sarah had agreed to play the wife in one of her first films, against the wishes of her then agent Robin Fox as Miles was unproven as a director, but having already made some home movies with her brother years before she decided to sign her brother's contract. Nicol Williamson, who was then with her in a play at the Royal Court Theatre, agreed to play the lover, with Bill Meilen completing cast.

The co-producer's mother, and another friendly investor put up £2,000, but the investor for the rest reneged on his contract two weeks before shooting, leaving a £3,000 short fall which Miles had to fill by putting up his small Paris flat as collateral to the Midland Bank.

The underground World Wide Studios, in Chancery Lane, London WC2 agreed to a six day shoot, and would help complete the crewing, which in 1963 was completely unionised which meant having to include four people on the sound equipment. This added to the budget costs, and was unnecessary as the portable light-weight Nagra tape-recorder, and others already invented several years earlier, could have avoided having the need for two extra crew members who used to move the old 1940-50's heavy equipment around the sound-stage.

Nevertheless a fully unionised crew was assembled with the help of a commercials producer, Ion Voyantziz, who suggested Miles see the work of a young cameraman David Watkin, who was working for British Transport Films, who cleverly thought that by using 'sound-stock' film in an old clockwork Newman Sinclair camera a 'duped' B&W orthochromatic look of the old silent films would be obtained. Miles then chose Bernard Sarron, for costumes and art direction, whose sense of satire he felt was in tune with the script, and Gerry Fletcher for make-up. The BFI helpfully suggested Arthur Dulay, who began a successful career as an accompanist of silent films for the first sequence. Miles was told his own Union Card had gone through the ACTT Union system, as the shoot had to start immediately owing to his sister's availability. The 6 day 6 set shoot on 2 sound- stages was completed on time and budget. However during the second week of editing, Peter Musgrave the editor, received a call from George Elvin, the ACTT General Secretary, saying that all work on the film had to stop, and that work in Humphries Laboratories would also halt development of the film, as it turned out Miles' director's Union Card acceptance vote had not been completed in time.

The Boulting Brothers were incandescent, and rang Elvin to say that his Union had stopped a young director/producer making a British film with a full Union crew, and that the news would be headlines unless the matter was resolved immediately.

As the producers/directors of many films, the Boultings especially upset the Unions with their film, "I'm Alright, Jack!" with Peter Sellers in his first major film role as a shop steward. The ACTT dichotomy is that a producer is an employer, whereas a director is an employee, so you cannot have both on a Union card. The matter was stormily resolved, making Miles the youngest British film director for many years, and showed how the young were prevented from becoming filmmakers. To stop enthusiastic, hard-working filmmakers from being exploited a union is necessary, but not like the type that existed then.

== Critical reception ==
The Boulting Brothers and Gerry Lewis, British Lion's Head of Publicity, were enthusiastic about the film, and felt with careful handling they thought that as the legal 'third Government force' in-between Rank and ABPC film circuits, they could get the film distributed and substituted for the dreary short film's of Rank's "Look at Life" and ABPC's "Pathé Pictorial" Luckily the national UK critics agreed with them, and started bombarding the press with requests for the dinosaur film circuits to wake up as to what the public wanted.

Nina Hibbin of the Daily Worker wrote "Oh, where have all the good 'shorts' gone?" "Shorts are vital to any film industry. They give young aspiring directors a chance to try their wings and present experienced filmmakers with the challenge of brevity. Almost every country takes them more seriously than Britain and America. Distribution-Exhibition monopolies refuse to back independent short-makers. Occasionally however enthusiastic filmmakers do manage to crash the shorts barrier. Christopher Miles, who made "The Six- Sided Triangle" has been making films since he was a 15, it Is everything a very young director's first big adventure should be, accomplished and entertaining.

Barry Norman of the Daily Mail wrote "The Six-Sided Triangle" is an excellent little production, a wicked satire, not only on national attitudes to the eternal triangle, but also on the way the subject is treated by the film industries of six countries. "There is no requests for the 30 minute features in the cinema at the moment" said British Lion, which is a pity, as Christopher Miles told me, "I mortgaged my flat and everything I own to make this picture " So far Christopher has been paid nothing.

William Hall of the London Evening News wrote, "An unknown British film may win Oscar" The film that couldn't get a booking on the big circuits has been nominated for an Academy award, " I can hardly believe it", said Christopher Miles the 23-year-old brother of Sarah, who was delighted.

Finally, at the request of Gorge Hoellering, the owner of the Academy Cinema in Oxford Street to show-case the film, the press were invited for a private viewing; the film received excellent reviews in the national press which helped British Lion & Lion International to distribute it throughout the world. At one screening at the Academy Cinema, the director who had crept unseen into a back seat, was surprised to see the audience stand and cheer at the closing credits.

"To have all the film-going experiences rolled into one half-hour is rather unnerving, but that is what a brilliantly talented young director, Christopher Miles, does with 'The Six-sided Triangle' - each of these episodes is a satirical delight.... Mr Miles has not only caught the flavour of the films he parodies; he has used different types of celluloid to get exactly the right quality in the cinematography. Felix Barker - EVENING NEWS - LONDON "...the long drab Bergman meal is very funny, so is the outburst of passionate Italian addressed to Sarah Miles, crisply subtitled after hours and hours "I admire your bust"...the observation of film styles is expert but not cliquish.... I really cannot see, apart from all- powerful self-interest, why Rank or ABC, shouldn't run it on the circuits one week, instead of their deadly 'Look at Life' or 'Pathé Pictorial'. Penelope Gilliat - THE OBSERVER

"...the parody being spread very cleverly over music, noises on the sound-track, dialogue, sub-titles, scenery and of course, acting. The young cast of three have their successes and failures. I liked especially Sarah Miles silent heroin with the Bella Donna eyes providing such fun in peeling a grape; Nicol Williamson manages to look wonderfully like Bergman's actor Max von Sydow, and Bill Meilen gives a good impression of Jean-Paul Belmondo. Patrick Gibbs - DAILY TELEGRAPH

"...the Swedish example, all death-symbols and strawberries I thought the best, though there is good observation in the lot. A few months ago I saw another short piece of his, "A Vol d'Oiseau" (Bird's Eye View) an engaging fantasy about Paris - a beginners work but they have ideas they ought to be given a chance. Dilys Powell - SUNDAY TIMES

"Youth is important to the film business, so why won't somebody give a showing to 23 year old Christopher Miles? The star is Christopher's sister Sarah, superbly versatile as all six heroines. This wry, sly, witty half-hour film shows a talent worth encouraging" DAILY MIRROR

"If ever the world's supply of sex symbols dries up, we can do a roaring trade exporting Miss Sarah Miles.These thoughts are prompted by a delicious bit of burlesque called "The Six-Sided Triangle" It is a skilful spoof of how the directors of five countries and one left over from the cinema's silent era, would cope with the most universal moment in movies when the husband returns home unexpectedly. The laughs crowd into the last 20 minutes. From there on "The Six-Sided Triangle" is sharp and deadly as Japanese illicit love is performed with grunts, barks, squeals and the belly-rumbling brand of Japanese dialogue, while everyone bows before dying. There is a priceless spoof of "Divorce Italian Style" with Sarah Miles wearing Sophia Loren's smile and Gina Lollobrigida's bosom, while subtitles of sub-literate compositions follow a line like, "Let us declare our friendship" and one like, "Angel cake". The same scenes in Sweden are a masterpiece of gloomy seduction, that ends with a joyless pair of lovers noisily eating their soup with doom laden slurping. For love in the French style Miss Miles lets down her hair into lascivious Bardo tresses, and the handheld camera makes a simple gesture of reaching for a cigarette into an excuse for a detailed tour of two bare torsos. The New Wave will recede in shame to see its own excesses so exposed. A splendid family affair" Alexander Walker - EVENING STANDARD

John Coleman the film critic of the New Statesman, interviewed Christopher Miles at BBC's Talks Bush House in 1964 for a programme on new directors, who told him that in Sweden the film had become "The Five-Sided Triangle" as they had cut the Bergmanesque sequence parodying their national hero. Thirty years later the DOP David Watkin, was asked by Ingmar Bergman's son Daniel to light a German Social Democrat campaign film, who laughed when David told him the story, and said that his father had seen the complete film and had laughed himself too.... so the Swedes do have a sense of humour!

When the film was shown on a 35mm projector for the last time at a special screening at the Little Theatre in Bath on 26 May 2016 to a packed house with Sarah and Christopher Miles present, the audience were very surprised to realise afterwards that Sarah does not speak a word throughout the whole film - showing the visual power of the film image when shown in its proper cinema setting. Even the critics 53 years before hadn't noticed that.
