= Anthony Greville-Bell =

Australian sculptor, scriptwriter (1920–2008)

- Born: 7 March 1920; Sydney, Australia
- Died: 4 March 2008 (aged 87); United Kingdom
- Military career
- Allegiance: United Kingdom
- Branch: British Army
- Rank: Officer
- Units: Royal Engineers; Special Air Service
- Conflicts: Second World War
- Awards: Distinguished Service Order
- Other work: Scriptwriter and sculptor

Anthony Greville-Bell, DSO (7 March 1920 – 4 March 2008) was an Australian-born officer who served in the Special Air Service during the Second World War and was later a notable scriptwriter and sculptor.

== Early life ==
Greville-Bell was born in Sydney, Australia, and educated at Blundell's School. On the outbreak of the Second World War, he enlisted and was commissioned into the British Army's Royal Engineers.

Greville-Bell married four times: to Diana Carnegie in 1945, Helen Scott-Duff in 1955, Ann Kennerley in 1972, the three marriages dissolved, and to Lauriance Rogier in 1996.

== Military career ==
As a sapper officer attached to the 2nd Special Air Service (SAS) commanded by Bill Stirling, Greville-Bell took part in Operation Speedwell against railway lines in northern Italy carrying German reinforcements and supplies to the front in September 1943. The troops landed by parachute but the officer commanding Greville-Bell's section dropped wide of the others and was not seen again. Greville-Bell took charge, despite having broken two ribs and damaged his back on landing. The section successfully attacked and cut the Bologna-Pistoia rail line and another south of Florence and destroyed a train.

Fourteen days after the drop, with their explosives and rations exhausted, they began 250-mile march south to join the advancing Eighth Army. On the eighteenth day they reached the villa of the Marchese Roberti at Fiesole, overlooking Florence. A sister of the marchese was a friend of Greville-Bell's family and she sheltered and fed the party for a few days until contact could be made with the Italian partisans.

The armistice with Italy announced on 8 September 1943 meant the partisans proved less aggressive towards their former German Allies than Greville-Bell hoped but he stayed until he had gained enough strength to continue south. To mark 28 days in Italy, he and Sergeant Daniels went into Florence and drank some beer in a bar full of German soldiers. On the 30th day he, Daniels and two partisans blew a charge beneath a southbound train north of Incisa.

Seventy-three days after their drop, Greville-Bell led Daniels and Tomasso through the German lines to safety. He was awarded the Distinguished Service Order for his efforts.

Greville-Bell returned to the SAS after the war when the Malayan Scouts (SAS Regiment) was raised by Michael "Mad Mike" Calvert in 1950 during the Malayan Emergency.

== Screenwriting ==
After the war Greville-Bell travelled widely, including to Sri Lanka where his father had worked as a tea planter before the war. He wrote several screenplays, three of which were made into films:

- Perfect Friday, a British bank-heist film released in 1970, directed by Peter Hall and starring Ursula Andress, Stanley Baker, David Warner and T.P. McKenna.
- The Strange Vengeance of Rosalie, released in 1972.
- Theatre of Blood, a horror film released in 1973, directed by Douglas Hickox and starring Vincent Price and Diana Rigg.
- Marked Personal, a TV series first shown in 1973 starring Stephanie Beacham and Carl Rigg.
- The God King, a Sri Lankan historical film released in 1975, directed by Lester James Peries and starring Leigh Lawson and Oliver Tobias.

== Sculpture ==
Sculpture had interested Greville-Bell since his schooldays, and he returned to it on a commercial basis in the late 1980s. His work featured nude female torsos, children's heads and birds. His bronze of a wounded soldier being helped to safety by a comrade, mounted on Portland stone, stands in the SAS Garden of Remembrance.

Greville-Bell died in the United Kingdom.

== Sources ==
- Extracted from Obituary – Anthony Greville-Bell, The Times, 28 March 2008
