= Les Bancals =

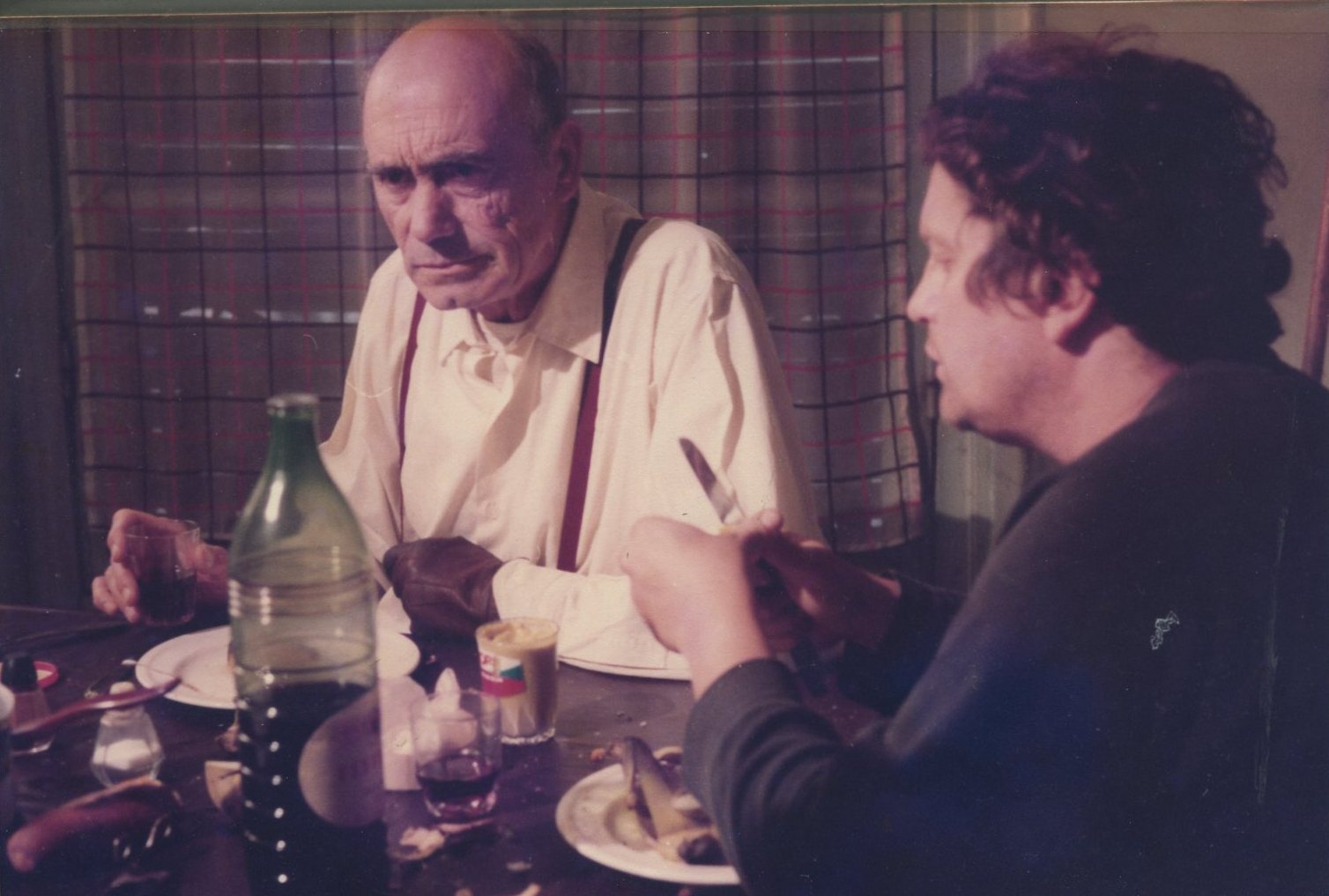

Les Bancals is a 1983 French film directed by Hervé Lièvre. It stars Paul Crauchet, Albert Delpy, Gilbert Bahon, and Mathieu Barbey. It was released on 18 May 1983.
