= A Time for Loving =

- Original poster
- Directed by: Christopher Miles
- Written by: Jean Anouilh
- Produced by: Dimitri de Grunwald; Mel Ferrer
- Starring: Joanna Shimkus; Mel Ferrer; Britt Ekland; Philippe Noiret; Susan Hampshire; Mark Burns
- Cinematography: Andréas Winding
- Edited by: Henri Lanoë
- Music by: Michel Legrand
- Production company: London Screenplays
- Distributed by: Hemdale Film Distributors; Anglo-EMI
- Release date: April 1972
- Running time: 104 minutes
- Country: United Kingdom
- Language: English

A Time for Loving is a 1972 British film directed by Christopher Miles and starring Joanna Shimkus and Mel Ferrer. The screenplay was by the French playwright Jean Anouilh. It is a bitter-sweet nostalgic look at Paris just before and during the second World War as seen by three couples, who over the years rent the same artist's studio in Montmartre.

== Plot ==
At the same time as an English man, Geoff arranges a rendezvous with his first love, Patricia, to recapture their first affair in a Montmartre studio, the son of the concierge persuades his first love Simone to climb up to the same studio bedroom window thinking it would be empty for the night. Meanwhile, Geoff finds Patricia has grown bitter over the years, and that the warmth has gone from their relationship, but when they disturb the two young lovers in the bedroom, the evening ends in a humorous and more light-hearted manner, as they are forced to crawl under the concierge's door to leave unseen.

Running late to school the concierge's son sees a young American girl, who is studying at the American Hospital of Paris in Neuilly, and who is having an affair with an older doctor. Not only must they keep the affair secret from the concierge, but also from the disapproving general public by having to meet in shady ‘hôtels de passe’. However an escape to the seaside in Normandy brings matters to a head between them, as the second world war begins.

In occupied Paris, Marcel, the managing director of an important cement business, arrives at the studio which he is renting for his mistress Josette, and bumps into a German Oberleutnant on the landing. As it is Christmas Eve, old enmities are put aside, but Marcel has to get his other Christmas presents home to his wife Hélioise and also to his mother, who lives the other side of Paris. All of whom offer Marcel the customary Christmas French dish of oysters, which are also given to him by his mistress for her party, along with her music teacher and her student Monsieur Grondin.

The only form of transport in Paris during those war years were velo-taxis, a type of bicycle rickshaws, which are unable to get the overweight Marcel to all of his women in time for their oyster dinners. These he has to consume in a hurry, one after the other, to be on time, albeit a bit green around the gills, for a secret meeting with the French Resistance. After the war all three men are reunited in the old studio.

== Cast ==
- Joanna Shimkus as Joan McLaine
- Mel Ferrer as Doctor Sherman Harrison
- Britt Ekland as Josette Papillon
- Susan Hampshire as Patricia Robinson
- Philippe Noiret as Marcel Dutartre-Dubreuil
- Mark Burns as Geoff Rolling
- Robert Dhéry as Léonard
- Eléonore Hirt as Héloïse Dutartre-Dubreuil
- Lila Kedrova as Madame Olga Dubillard
- Didier Haudepin as son of the concierge
- Ophelie Stermann as Simone
- Gilberte Géniat as the concierge
- Jany Holt as Marcel's mother Mme Dutartre-Dubreuil
- René Kolldehoff as Oberleutnant
- Michel Legrand as Monsieur Grondin
- Lyne Chardonnet as La fille du bar

== Production ==
After the success of The Virgin and the Gypsy, Dimitri de Grunwald, who had arranged the finance through his European Consortium, teamed up with Christopher Miles again, who in gratitude agreed to direct A Time for Loving as long as a meeting could be arranged with Jean Anouilh to discuss the screenplay. This de Grunwald arranged in the Hotel Provençal in the South of France near where Anouilh lived.

This 1930s hotel, in which the bar hosted Scott Fitzgerald where he wrote Tender is the night was to close the following year, and reflected that elusive bygone era which Anouilh was trying to capture. Anouilh agreed to meet Miles at the bar at 5 pm the night of Bastille Day 1970 and see if it was possible for him to reconsider some aspects of the screenplay for the modern audience. Miles reports that at 5 pm sharp a sixty year old moustached man with gold-rimmed spectacle and a twinkle in his eye shook him by the hand saying in French "Eh bien, I have reread my scenario and I find it enchanting" – so there was little else Miles could say to the great man, but to toast the project, and watch the fireworks from the hotel.

In fact Anouilh did help later with some rewriting by improving the interlocking dialogue for some of the sequences, which were needed in a hurry as shooting was to begin in Paris on Pont Alexandre III which had to be closed to the public for filming on 4 August 1970, a studio built on an existing house in Rue Berthe, Montmartre, as well as its interiors to be designed and built by Theo Meurisse at the Studio Boulogne, all to be co- ordinated by Miles’ friend from their Paris film student days, Patrick Bureau.

Anouilh had set his script in Montparnasse, but by the 1970s the modern towers dominated the exteriors, so Miles moved the location to Montmartre which he knew well from his student days. This meant getting helpful co-operation from his old friends, the local vegetable market sellers, the butcher, the local artists and the poet Pierre Jacob and his wife Josia to play small roles and appear in the film.

== Critical reception ==
Alexander Walker of the London Evening Standard wrote "Though one is surprised to see it done at all any longer, I have to admit it is done very well in Christopher Miles's romantic comedy...'Time for Loving' is one of the very few English films made in France that is worth the Channel crossing."

Dilys Powell of the Sunday Times wrote "... and it's amusing to see Michel Legrand, most prolific of film music composers, making a spirited appearance with a trombone: in my eyes Lila Kedrova never over-acts: one admires too, the re-creation of war-time Paris, streets empty of traffic except for bicycle-taxis."

The Daily Telegraph wrote: "The most striking quality of this handsome, erratic film, is its splendidly square sense of place. ... Christopher Miles accurately gauges the material things that give substance to an experience ... really it is less a time for loving than time remembered".

The London Evening News reviewed the film as: "Directed with leisurely sophistication by Christopher Miles – reunited with his Virgin and Gypsy stars Joanna Shimkus and Mark Burns ... it's a rose among the West End weeds."

Derek Malcolm of The Guardian wrote: "There is delicious Joanna Shimkus as a medical student in love with Mel Ferrer's middle-aged doctor, Susan Hampshire's icy rich lady failing to rekindle her affair with Mark Burns, and the estimable Philippe Noiret as a harassed business man trying to satisfy his wife, mistress and self-pitying mother".

== Bibliography ==
- Harper, Sue. British Film Culture in the 1970s. Edinburgh University Press, 2013.
