= Theatre of Blood =

1973 film directed by Douglas Hickox

- Theatrical release poster
- Directed by: Douglas Hickox
- Screenplay by: Anthony Greville-Bell
- Story by: Stanley Mann; John Kohn
- Produced by: John Kohn; Stanley Mann
- Starring: Vincent Price; Diana Rigg; Ian Hendry; Harry Andrews; Coral Browne; Robert Coote; Jack Hawkins; Michael Hordern; Arthur Lowe; Robert Morley; Dennis Price
- Cinematography: Wolfgang Suschitzky
- Edited by: Malcolm Cooke
- Music by: Michael J. Lewis
- Production companies: Harbour Productions Ltd. Cineman Productions
- Distributed by: United Artists
- Release dates: 16 March 1973 (Toronto); 5 April 1973 (US); 7 June 1973 (UK)
- Running time: 104 minutes
- Country: United Kingdom
- Language: English
- Box office: $1 million (U.S./ Canada rentals)

Theatre of Blood (released as Theater of Blood in the United States) is a 1973 British horror comedy film directed by Douglas Hickox. It stars Vincent Price as a deranged Shakespearean actor who takes revenge on his critics, using methods inspired by death scenes from the Bard's plays. Diana Rigg co-stars as his daughter and confidant. The ensemble supporting cast features Ian Hendry, Harry Andrews, Coral Browne, Jack Hawkins, Michael Hordern, Arthur Lowe, Robert Morley, Milo O'Shea, Diana Dors, Dennis Price, and Robert Coote in one of his final roles.

The film was released by United Artists on March 16, 1973, receiving both critical and commercial success. Considered a cult film, Theatre of Blood is well-regarded by fans of Vincent Price, and was considered by both Price and Diana Rigg as one of their favourite of their own films. A stage adaptation was produced at the Royal National Theatre in 2005.

== Plot ==
After being humiliated by members of the London Theatre Critics Guild at an awards ceremony, Shakespearean actor Edward Kendal Sheridan Lionheart is seen apparently committing suicide by diving into the Thames from a great height. He actually survives, however, and is rescued by a group of vagrants.

Two years later, beginning on the Ides of March, Lionheart sets out to exact vengeance against the critics who failed to acclaim his genius, killing them one by one in ways very similar to murder scenes in the season of William Shakespeare's plays that he last performed. Before each murder, Lionheart recites the critic's damning review of his performance in the role.

The first critic, George Maxwell, is repeatedly stabbed by a mob of murderous homeless people, suggested by the murder of Julius Caesar in Julius Caesar. The second, Hector Snipe, is impaled with a spear, and his body is dragged away to appear at Maxwell's funeral tied to a horse's tail, replicating the murder of Hector in Troilus and Cressida. The third, Horace Sprout, is decapitated while sleeping, as is Cloten in Cymbeline. The fourth critic, Trevor Dickman, has his heart cut out by Shylock in The Merchant of Venice, the play being rewritten so that Antonio is forced to repay his debt with a pound of flesh. The fifth, Oliver Larding, is drowned in a barrel of wine, as is George Plantagenet, Duke of Clarence in Richard III.

For the next play, Romeo and Juliet, Lionheart lures the critic Peregrine Devlin to a fencing gymnasium, where he re-enacts the sword fight from the play. He badly wounds Devlin but chooses not to kill him at this juncture. The sixth critic to die, Solomon Psaltery, an obsessively jealous man, murders his wife Maisie, believing her to be unfaithful, as portrayed in Othello. Although Psaltery survives, his actions lead to his imprisonment, and he will likely die in prison. The seventh critic to die, Miss Chloe Moon, is electrocuted to replicate the burning of Joan of Arc in Henry VI, Part 1. The eighth critic to die, flamboyant gourmand Meredith Merridew, is force-fed pies made from the flesh of his two toy poodles until he chokes to death, replicating the demise of Queen Tamora in Titus Andronicus.

It is revealed that Lionheart is being aided by his adoring daughter Edwina, often while she is dressed as a man. She kidnaps Devlin and brings him to the theatre, where Lionheart tells him to give him the award or be blinded with red-hot daggers, as happens to Gloucester in King Lear. He refuses, but the contraption meant to blind him gets stuck. Lionheart sets fire to the theatre. In the confusion, one of the vagrants kills Edwina by striking her on the head with the award statuette, unwittingly casting her in the role of Cordelia, Lear's youngest daughter. Lionheart retreats, carrying her body to the roof and delivering Lear's final monologue before the roof caves in, setting him ablaze and sending him to his death. Devlin, a critic even in the face of death, then gives Lionheart's performance a positive if mixed review.

== Cast ==
- Vincent Price as Edward Lionheart
- Diana Rigg as Edwina Lionheart
- Ian Hendry as Peregrine Devlin
- Harry Andrews as Trevor Dickman
- Robert Coote as Oliver Larding
- Michael Hordern as George Maxwell
- Robert Morley as Meredith Merridew
- Coral Browne as Chloe Moon
- Jack Hawkins as Solomon Psaltery
- Arthur Lowe as Horace Sprout
- Dennis Price as Hector Snipe
- Milo O'Shea as Inspector Boot
- Eric Sykes as Sgt. Dogge
- Diana Dors as Maisie Psaltery
- Joan Hickson as Mrs. Sprout
- Renée Asherson as Mrs. Maxwell
- Madeline Smith as Rosemary
- Brigid Erin Bates as Agnes
- Charles Sinnickson as Vicar
- Tutte Lemkow, Declan Mulholland, Stanley Bates, and John Gilpin as Meths Drinkers

Like other movies in the last years of his life, Jack Hawkins was dubbed by his friend Charles Gray. Both Hawkins and Dennis Price died within a few months of the film's release. This was also the final film role of Robert Coote.

== Production ==
=== Development ===
The film was originally to be titled Much Ado About Murder. The screenplay was written by Anthony Greville-Bell, based on a story by producers Stanley Mann and John Kohn. Robert Fuest, director of The Abominable Dr. Phibes (1971) and its sequel Dr. Phibes Rises Again (1972), was originally offered this film to direct, but turned it down on the grounds of not wishing to be seen as "the guy who makes Vincent Price theme killing movies."

=== Casting ===
Director Douglas Hickox said: "The cast was so good that all I had to do as director was open the dressing room door and let the cameras roll."

Diana Rigg introduced Vincent Price to his future wife Coral Browne during the making of the film. Browne recalled in a television documentary Caviar to the General in 1990 that she had not wanted to make "one of those scary Vincent Price movies", but she was persuaded to take the part of Chloe Moon by her friends Robert Morley and Michael Hordern, acknowledging that the film thus had a very strong cast. Rigg was unaware that Price was married.

When pre-production commenced, Coral Browne insisted that she would wear only clothing designed by Jean Muir. The film's costume designer, Michael Baldwin, informed Browne that the budget could not possibly stretch to designer clothing for any of the cast. Baldwin was surprised and angered to get a call from Douglas Hickox after he had had a meeting with Browne, telling him that she could have the dresses she requested, increasing the budget solely to accommodate her demands. Baldwin was further infuriated to discover that Browne kept all the dresses after filming wrapped.

This film was reportedly a favourite of Vincent Price's, as he had always wanted the chance to act in Shakespeare. Before or after each death in the film, Lionheart recites passages of Shakespeare, giving Price an outlet to deliver such speeches as Prince Hamlet's third soliloquy ("To be, or not to be, that is the question...") from Hamlet; Mark Antony's eulogy for Julius Caesar from Julius Caesar ("Friends, Romans, countrymen, lend me your ears..."); "Now is the winter of our discontent..." from the beginning of Richard III; and the raving of King Lear after the death of his faithful daughter Cordelia from King Lear.

=== Filming ===
Theatre of Blood was shot entirely on location. Edward Lionheart (Price)'s hideout, the "Burbage Theatre", was the Putney Hippodrome, which was built in 1906, but had been vacant and dilapidated for more than ten years before it was used in the film. It was demolished in 1975 to make way for housing.

Lionheart's tomb is a Sievier family monument in Kensal Green Cemetery, showing a seated man, one hand placed on the head of a woman kneeling in adoration, while the other holds the Bible, its pages opened to a passage from the Gospel of Luke. The monument was altered for the film by substituting plaster masks of Price and Diana Rigg for the real faces, replacing the Bible with a volume of William Shakespeare, and adding Lionheart's name and dates.

Peregrine Devlin (Ian Hendry)'s Thames-side apartment is the penthouse flat at Alembic House (now known as Peninsula Heights) on the Albert Embankment. At the time of filming, the property belonged to the actor and film producer Stanley Baker. It was subsequently the London home of novelist Jeffrey Archer.

"Young Man Among Roses", the miniature featured in the introduction and used as the model for the Critics' Award Statuette, is by the Elizabethan portraitist Nicholas Hilliard.

The gymnasium where Lionheart and Devlin fence is located at the American School in London in St. John's Wood.

== Release ==
The film premiered in Toronto on March 16, 1973. It opened to a wide release in the United States on April 5, and in the United Kingdom on June 7.

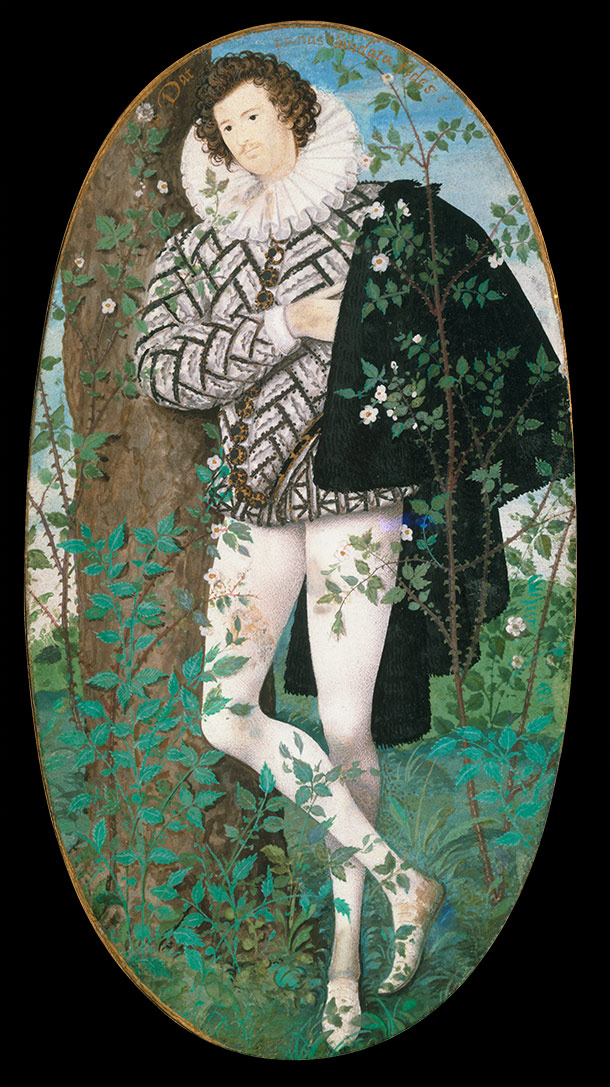
Young Man Among Roses, c. 1585–1595, Victoria and Albert Museum. It is believed to be a portrait of Robert Devereux, 2nd Earl of Essex.

== Critical reception ==
On the review aggregator website Rotten Tomatoes, 88% of 41 critics' reviews are positive. The website's consensus reads: "Deliciously campy and wonderfully funny, Theater of Blood features Vincent Price at his melodramatic best." On Metacritic, the film has a weighted average score of 81 out of 100 based on 11 critics, which the site labels as "universal acclaim".

The Monthly Film Bulletin wrote: "Although his schematic vengeance invites comparison with that of the Abominable Dr. Phibes, ... Edward Lionheart happily turns out to be a villain of infinitely higher calibre. ... Douglas Hickox's direction is fairly adroit: he makes effective use of locations, and a constantly moving camera prevents the brazen theatricality of the whole scheme becoming too overt. He also sustains a reasonable amount of tension by keeping the murders on the level of grand guignol rather than farce; but in order to sustain our interest, it would have been necessary to reserve some surprises for the last third of the film, and here both script and direction begin to flag. The killing of Meredith Merridrew (Robert Morley) by forcing him to eat his pet poodles remains merely unpleasant, though Lionheart has by this time become such a generally sympathetic character that the conventional denouement is both tedious and irritating. Indeed, Price's superb antics have so effectively upstaged the other performers that the last remaining critic's refusal to alter his original judgment emerges as an act of crass stupidity rather than courage."

The Los Angeles Times called it "quite possibly the best horror film Vincent Price has ever made. Certainly it affords him the best role he has ever had in the genre. A triumph of witty, stylish Grand Guignol, it allows Price to range richly between humour and pathos."

The film is sometimes considered to be a spoof or homage of The Abominable Dr. Phibes. Similarities with the earlier film include a protagonist who is presumed dead and is seeking revenge; nine intended victims, one of whom works directly with Scotland Yard and survives; themed murders rooted in literature; and a young female sidekick.

== Stage adaptation ==
The film was adapted for the stage by the British company Improbable, with Jim Broadbent playing Edward Lionheart and Rachael Stirling (Diana Rigg's daughter), playing Lionheart's daughter. The play differs from the film in that the critics are from British newspapers, including The Guardian and The Times, and the only set is an abandoned theatre. The play is again set in the 1970s, rather than being updated. Most of the secondary characters were excised, including police, and the number of deaths reduced. The killings based on Othello and Cymbeline are omitted as they would have to take place outside the theatre and rely on secondary characters, such as the critics' wives. The name of Lionheart's daughter is changed from Edwina to Miranda to enhance the Shakespearean influence. The adaptation ran in London at the National Theatre between May and September 2005 and received mixed reviews.
