= Le Signe du Lion =

The Sign of Leo
- French poster
- Directed by: Éric Rohmer
- Written by: Éric Rohmer (scenario); Paul Gégauff (dialogue)
- Produced by: Claude Chabrol
- Starring: Jess Hahn
- Cinematography: Nicholas Hayer
- Edited by: Anne-Marie Cotret; Marie-Josèphe Yoyotte
- Music by: Louis Saguer
- Release date: 2 May 1962 (France)
- Running time: 103 minutes
- Country: France
- Language: French

Le Signe du lion (The Sign of Leo) is a black and white French drama film directed by Éric Rohmer, which was filmed on location in Paris in the summer of 1959 but not released until May 1962, and is not among his Six Moral Tales. It is his first full-length work. Along with The 400 Blows and À Double Tour by Claude Chabrol, who produced The Sign of Leo, it counts as one of the first films of the French New Wave.

The title refers to the Zodiac sign of Leo, under which the protagonist says he was born, and much of the plot revolves around notions of luck and fate. The penniless Pierre believes he has inherited a fortune but, when told it went to a cousin, sinks into indigence and despair. Then he is found by a friend who says the cousin has died and Pierre has really inherited the fortune.

The film was not a commercial success and for eight years afterwards Rohmer concentrated on short films and on his work at the influential film magazine Cahiers du cinéma.

== Plot ==
In early summer in Paris, the would-be composer or architect, American by nationality, Peter Wesselrin, commonly known as Pierre, learns that his rich aunt has died. Expecting a substantial legacy, he borrows a large sum from his closest friend, the journalist Jean-François, and throws a celebratory party for everybody he knows. There, while playing his violin sonata, a work in progress, he is given notice that he is to be evicted. However, as he explains to his friends, he is always lucky because he is a Leo.

A few weeks later, Jean-François tells friends he cannot find Pierre, who has been moving between cheap hotels. Then he hears that the aunt's wealth was left entirely to a cousin but, still unable to contact Pierre, has to take an assignment overseas. By August, all of Pierre's friends have left for their holidays and he is selling his possessions in order to have enough to eat.

Evicted from his last hotel, he has to live rough. Hearing that a smuggler is looking for couriers, he walks a long way through the heat, only to find that even the crooks are on vacation. He ruins his trousers by spilling tinned sardines on them, his shoes are disintegrating and, when he steals some food, is caught and beaten. Homeless, hungry, unshaven and dirty, he has reached bottom. In the end, he survives by help from another down-and-out called Toto, who begs money from tourists as a street entertainer.

On returning to Paris, Jean-François tries to find his friend, going from hotel to hotel. At one, he is given a letter sent to Pierre by a lawyer, which says that the cousin from Karlsruhe has died in an accident and Pierre is now the sole heir to his aunt's wealth. Unable to contact Pierre, Jean-François tells the story to the press, who print the story of the tramp who has inherited a fortune. One evening, outside a café where Jean-François is sitting, Pierre starts playing his sonata on a borrowed violin. Recognising the music, Jean-François is able to give his friend the news that will change his life. Abandoning Toto, who saved his life, Pierre invites all his old friends to a celebratory party.

== Cast ==
- Jess Hahn : Pierre Wesselrin
- Michèle Girardon : Dominique Laurent
- Van Doude : Jean-François Santeuil
- Paul Bisciglia : Willy
- Gilbert Edard : Michel Caron
- Paul Crauchet : Fred
- Stéphane Audran : The hotel manager
- Jean Le Poulain : Toto
- Françoise Prévost : Hélène
- Marie Dubois : The girl at the café
- Jean-Luc Godard : The melomane
- Jean-Pierre Melville : A customer
- Alain Resnais : A customer
- Macha Méril : The blond at the 14th July

== Production ==
It is shot in a wider 1.66 aspect ratio, unlike the 1.37 Academy ratio of almost all Rohmer's other films, and has an intermittent musical score, which is rare in his work. Though he normally wrote his films, in this case he is only credited with the story and the often barrack-room dialogue is by Paul Gégauff. Unlike almost all his work, the plot revolves around three men, with women being relegated to supporting characters. A Nouvelle Vague characteristic was to include cameos for fellow directors and favourite actors, and consequently this film features Jean-Luc Godard, Stéphane Audran, Marie Dubois and Macha Méril.

== Reception and influence ==
Though praised by other members of the Nouvelle Vague, including Jean-Luc Godard, who put it on his top ten for 1962, it was slow to reach the English-speaking world, not being screened until 1966 in the UK and 1970 in the United States.

A commentator noted how "the film is littered with painful moments" and that "with its depiction of one man's long physical and spiritual decline, Le Signe Du Lion recalls the great naturalist novels of Émile Zola as well as the works of American realists such as Theodore Dreiser. It marks Rohmer out as one of the most literary of New Wave directors - always devoting particular attention to his characters' complex emotions and inner thoughts."

Another critic wrote that the film is "also a precise, poetic documentary on Paris, with the city turning into a stone prison that gradually crushes resistance until the musician suffers total moral and physical disintegration."

Rainer Werner Fassbinder paid homage to it in 1966 with his first short film, Der Stadtstreicher.
