= White Fire (film) =

1984 thriller film

- VHS box cover
- Directed by: Jean-Marie Pallardy
- Screenplay by: Edward John Francis
- Story by: Jean-Marie Pallardy
- Produced by: Jean-Marie Pallardy; Allen G. Rainer
- Starring: Robert Ginty; Fred Williamson; Belinda Mayne; Jess Hahn; Mirella Banti; Diana Goodman; Gordon Mitchell
- Cinematography: Roger Fellous
- Edited by: Bruno Zincone
- Music by: Jon Lord
- Distributed by: Trans World Entertainment
- Release date: 1984
- Running time: 101 minutes
- Countries: France; Turkey; United States

White Fire (also known as Vivre pour survivre and Le Diamant) is a 1984 French-American-Italian-Turkish action film by Jean-Marie Pallardy. It stars Belinda Mayne, Robert Ginty, Fred Williamson, Gordon Mitchell and Jess Hahn. The title song of the film is White Fire, sung by rock group Limelight.

== Plot ==
Bo (Ginty) and Ingrid (Mayne), respectively brother and sister, employees at a diamond mineshaft company, stumble upon the discovery of a legendary diamond, the "White Fire", and a band of criminals set out to take it from them.
