= Ho! =

- Directed by: Robert Enrico
- Screenplay by: Robert Enrico; Lucienne Hamon; Pierre Pelegri; José Giovanni
- Based on: Ho! by José Giovanni
- Produced by: Paul Laffargue
- Starring: Jean-Paul Belmondo; Joanna Shimkus
- Cinematography: Maurice Fellous
- Music by: François de Roubaix
- Release date: 1968
- Language: French

Ho! (Italian: Criminal Face - Storia di un criminale) is a 1968 French-Italian crime film directed by Robert Enrico and starring Jean-Paul Belmondo. It is based on the 1964 novel Ho! by José Giovanni.

The film recorded admissions of 1,774,340 in France.

== Plot ==
The race car driver François Holin, nicknamed Ho (Jean-Paul Belmondo) abandons his sport after his friend is killed because of him and becomes part of a gang of bank robbers. Other members of the gang – the Schwartz brothers, treat him with contempt but work with him because without a good getaway driver their plans are doomed to failure. During preparation for the next robbery the leader of the gang is killed, and Ho intends to take his place to carry out the robbery. As usual, the first part of the plan is carjacking which is entrusted to Ho. But the police manage to seize him and he is sent to prison. There he sits in a cell with a bum who has received a mere 1,5 months sentence and begins to impersonate him. After 1,5 months pass the guards can no longer distinguish one from the other and Ho manages to get out of jail instead of the tramp. Immediately he creates false documents for himself and returns to the old apartment of his gang. The next day all the newspapers publish front-page articles about the daring escape, calling Holin public enemy number one, a man with nerves of steel, and state that while such a brilliant criminal is on the loose, the criminal world is invincible. Thus the police with the help of journalists hope to provoke Holin to rash acts unaware of his excessive vanity. But he unravels their plan and forces the author of these articles to write the truth. Moreover Holin intends to implement a plan that they developed before his arrest, but the Schwartz brothers refuse to work with him as they have already found a replacement for him. Then Holin goes in search of new associates and finds three small time robbers, who offer participation in a bank robbery. They succeed in the robbery, but soon the police are out on the Holin’s trail, knowing his weakness for expensive ties and set up ambushes in stores. Trying to escape from persecution Holin again faces the Schwartz brothers who are trying to take away his stolen money. This costs the life of the brothers and the girlfriend of Holin, a well-known model. Holin again ends up in the hands of the police again.

== Cast ==
- Jean-Paul Belmondo as François Holin
- Joanna Shimkus as Bénédicte
- Raymond Bussières as Robert
- Paul Crauchet as Gabriel Briand
- Stéphane Fey as Schwartz Junior
- Alain Mottet as Paul
- Tony Taffin as Old Schwartz
- André Weber as La Praline
- Jackie Sardou as Mado
- Bob Ingarao as Schneider
- Pierre Leproux as Roger
- Jean-Paul Tribout as Falsten
- Sydney Chaplin as Canter
- Jean-Pierre Castaldi as Bénédicte's Friend
- Alain Delon as Man At Airport

== Reception ==
Time Out said it was for "indulgent Belmondo fans only", and called it a turgid effort "from the time when the star could churn out any old rubbish and still clean up at the French box office."
