= That Lucky Touch =

- Directed by: Christopher Miles
- Written by: Moss Hart; John Briley; Monja Danischewsky
- Produced by: Dimitri de Grunwald; Timothy Burrill
- Starring: Roger Moore; Susannah York; Lee J. Cobb
- Cinematography: Douglas Slocombe
- Edited by: Tom Priestley
- Music by: John Scott
- Production companies: De Grunwald Productions; Gloria Film
- Distributed by: Fox-Rank; Allied Artists (US)
- Release date: 7 August 1975
- Running time: 89 minutes
- Countries: United Kingdom; West Germany
- Language: English
- Budget: £960,858

That Lucky Touch is a 1975 British-West German comedy film directed by Christopher Miles and starring Roger Moore, Susannah York and Shelley Winters.

The film was shot at Pinewood Studios, with location shooting around Brussels. The film's sets were designed by the art director Jack Maxsted. It was originally entitled Heaven Save Us from Our Friends.

== Plot ==
An international arms dealer, at a NATO meeting to sell weaponry, becomes entangled with a female journalist from The Washington Post whose worldview is very different from his.

== Cast ==
- Roger Moore as Michael Scott
- Susannah York as Julia Richardson
- Shelley Winters as Diana Steedeman
- Lee J. Cobb as Lt. Gen. Henry Steedman
- Jean-Pierre Cassel as Leo
- Raf Vallone as Gen. Peruzzi
- Sydne Rome as Sophie
- Donald Sinden as British Gen. Armstrong
- Michael Shannon as Lt. Davis
- Aubrey Woods as Viscount L'Ardey
- Alfred Hoffman as Berckman
- Vincent Hall as David Richardson
- Julie Dawn Cole as Tina Steedman
- Fabian Cevallos as Photographer
- Timothy Carlton as Tank commander
- Takis Emmanuel as Arab Sheik

== Production ==
Roger Moore made the film after The Man with the Golden Gun. He wrote in his memoirs that it was "a very amusing story" and he was excited about the prospect of starring opposite Sophia Loren, who was to be the female lead. However Loren pulled out and Moore recommended Susannah York, who had just made Gold with Moore.

The film was shot at Pinewood Studios and in Brussels.

== Critical response ==
In his 2015 publication of movie ratings, Leonard Maltin gave That Lucky Touch one and a half stars and described the film as a "tepid romantic farce."

Moore wrote "I don’t think That Lucky Touch came off as a comedy. Looking at the finished film, I felt that the pacing wasn’t there. It had funny moments, but it wasn’t the success I’d hoped it might be."

In 1985, Moore's biographer called it "a singularly dreadful picture... which is a very strong contender for being the worst film that Roger has ever made."
