= The Wise Guys =

- Directed by: Robert Enrico
- Screenplay by: Robert Enrico; José Giovanni
- Produced by: Michel Ardan; Gérard Beytout
- Starring: Bourvil; Lino Ventura
- Cinematography: Jean Boffety
- Edited by: Jacqueline Meppiel; Michel Lewin
- Music by: François de Roubaix
- Distributed by: SNC
- Release date: 22 October 1965
- Running time: 128 minutes
- Country: France
- Language: French
- Box office: 3,593,724 admissions (France)

The Wise Guys (U.S. video title: Jailbirds' Vacation) (French: Les Grandes Gueules) is a 1965 French drama film directed by Robert Enrico, based on a novel by José Giovanni. Featuring two popular male leads in Bourvil and Lino Ventura, it tells the story of a man struggling to get his ancient family sawmill back into production, despite violent opposition from competitors and betrayal by his right-hand man.

It was the eighth most popular film at the French box office in 1965.

== Plot ==
When his father dies, Hector returns after 20 years in Canada to the Vosges mountains in order to take over the family sawmill. Remote and antiquated, it cannot compete with modern concerns and nobody wants to work there. At an auction, he runs into two ex-convicts, Laurent and Mick, who are looking for a job. Laurent persuades Hector to recruit a group of parolees from the local prison.

At first, the arrangement works well. With a labour force who are paid little and cannot leave, he is able to get the sawmill into production again. This incurs the wrath of Therraz, owner of a timber business further down the valley who does not want a competitor with lower costs, and battles ensue between rival groups of woodcutters.

One parolee, called Reichmann, was held back and eventually Hector is told that he will be arriving by bus the day after the village fête. The workers are enjoying the fête until a group of Therraz's men break it up in an epic battle. When the police arrive, Mick is found dead. Next morning, when Hector goes to pick up Reichmann, the man is not there.

Returning to the sawmill, he finds the police taking all the parolees back to jail and learns that Laurent's motive for hiring them was to get Reichmann into a lonely place where he could kill him. In despair at the treachery, and the failure of his dream, Hector decides to burn down the sawmill and die in the flames. Laurent, who was heading off for Italy, repents and rushes back to the mill, just in time to save him.

== Cast ==
- Bourvil as Hector Valentin
- Lino Ventura as Laurent
- Jean-Claude Rolland as Mick
- Jess Hahn as Nénesse
- Marie Dubois as Jackie
- Michel Constantin as Skida
- Nick Stephanini as Therraz
- Paul Crauchet as Pelissier
