= Joanna Shimkus =

Canadian actress

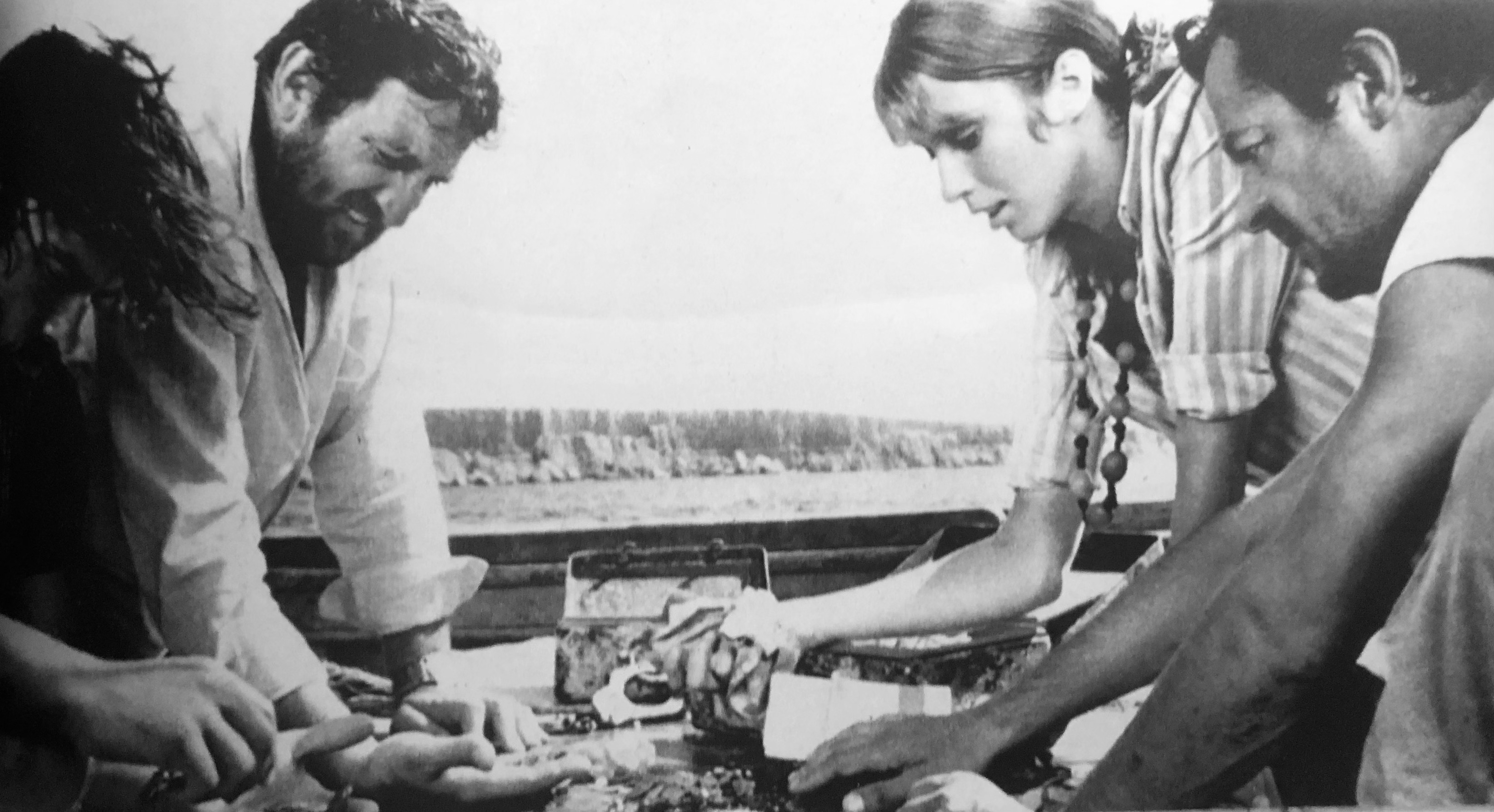
- Born: Joanna Marie Shimkus; 30 October 1943 (age 83); Halifax, Nova Scotia, Canada
- Occupation: Actress
- Years active: 1964–1972; 2010; 2018
- Spouse: Sidney Poitier (m. 1976; died 2022)
- Children: 2, including Sydney Tamiia Poitier

Joanna Marie Shimkus (born 30 October 1943) is a Canadian film actress. She is the widow of actor Sidney Poitier and mother of actress Sydney Tamiia Poitier.

== Early life ==
Joanna Marie Shimkus was born in Halifax, Nova Scotia, to Joseph Shimkus, a Jewish father of Lithuanian descent, and Marie Petrie, a Roman Catholic of French descent. Her father worked for the Royal Canadian Navy. She attended a convent school and was brought up in Montreal.

== Career ==
She made her debut in 1964 in Jean Aurel's film De l'amour. (She was first featured in Jean-Luc Godard's short "Montparnasse-Levallois," his contribution to the anthology film Six in Paris; it was shot in December 1963, but the film was not released until 1965.) She was then noticed by film director Robert Enrico, who selected her to appear in three of his films; Les aventuriers (1967), opposite Alain Delon and Lino Ventura, Tante Zita (1968), and Ho! (1968).

She appeared in Joseph Losey's film Boom! (1968), opposite Elizabeth Taylor and Richard Burton, and The Lost Man (1969), opposite Sidney Poitier. Her film career continued until the early 1970s, including roles in L'Invitée (1969), The Virgin and the Gypsy (1970), The Marriage of a Young Stockbroker (1971), and A Time for Loving (1972).

== Personal life ==
Shimkus married Sidney Poitier in 1976, and they have two daughters: Anika and Sydney Tamiia, who is also an actress. Shimkus has three grandchildren; two from Anika and one from Sydney Tamiia. Sidney Poitier died on January 6, 2022, aged 94.
