= The Clandestine Marriage (film) =

- Directed by: Christopher Miles
- Release date: 1999
- Country: United Kingdom
- Language: English

The Clandestine Marriage is a 1999 British comedy film directed by Christopher Miles and starring Nigel Hawthorne, Joan Collins, Timothy Spall and Tom Hollander. It is based on the 1766 play The Clandestine Marriage by David Garrick and George Colman. This was also the final role for Nigel Hawthorne before his death.

== Cast ==
- Nigel Hawthorne as Lord Ogleby
- Joan Collins as Mrs. Heidelberg
- Timothy Spall as Sterling
- Tom Hollander as Sir John Ogelby
- Paul Nicholls as Richard Lovewell
- Natasha Little as Fanny
- Emma Chambers as Betsy
- Cyril Shaps as Canton
- Ray Fearon as Brush
- Mark Burns as Capstick
- Timothy Bateson as Gaoler
- Craster Pringle as Ruben
- Lara Harvey as Lucy
- Jenny Galloway as Mrs Trusty
- Philippa Stanton as Chamber
- Cavan Kendall as Sergeant Flower
- Roger Hammond as Traverse

== Plot ==
Mr. Sterling is incredibly wealthy, but to his dismay not an aristocrat. He believes his social status will rise if he marries off his daughter Betsy to an aristocrat. Unknown to him however, his other daughter Fanny has already secretly married the man she loves, her fathers' clerk Richard Lovewell. To complicate matters, she is also pregnant. Sir John Ogleby is presented as a candidate to marry Betsy, and he and his father Lord Ogleby visit Mr. Sterling to make up the contract. Secretly, however, Lord Ogleby is impoverished and needs this marriage to provide his family with new wealth. While preparations are made to celebrate the engagement of Betsy and Sir John, including the building of a new fountain which will be the highlight of the feast and the centre piece of Mr. Sterlings' Rococo garden, Fanny and Richard are trying to find a way to keep their marriage a secret, whilst Sir John seems to be much more interested in Fanny rather than Betsy. In the end, the secrets are out. But all ends well, when Fanny and Richard are forgiven, and Lord Ogleby himself marries Betsy.
