= Richard Martin (stage director) =

French actor (1943–2023)

Richard Martin (1943 – 16 October 2023) was a French theatre director, playwright, and actor known for The Woman Cop, Cap Canaille, and Too Beautiful for You. Martin was born in Nice in 1943, and died on 16 October 2023, at the age of 80.

== Biography ==
In 1960, at the age of 17, Richard Martin moved to Paris to begin his professional acting career. He worked as an independent actor in boulevard theatre for eight years. The events of May 68 marked a turning point for him; he returned to his native Southern France and briefly directed the Théâtre Massalia in Marseille. In 1970, alongside his wife, actress Tania Sourseva, he founded the Théâtre Toursky—named in honor of the poet Axel Toursky—in the disadvantaged Belle de Mai district of Marseille.

The theater was the realization of a humanist life project shared with Sourseva, with whom he maintained a deeply fused relationship. The project was defined by political, humanist, and fraternal values, aimed at making theater accessible to everyone in one of Marseille's poorest neighborhoods. Following Sourseva's death, Martin remarked that it had become "much colder." Their son, Richard Psourtseff, also worked at the Toursky and has pursued a career as an actor and lighting designer. In 1974, he launched the "Théâtrobus," a converted bus used to perform shows within low-income housing estates (cités).

In 2002, Martin was appointed a Chevalier of the Ordre des Arts et des Lettres.

The subsidy granted to the Théâtre Toursky by the Direction régionale des Affaires culturelles (DRAC) fell from €185,000 in 1996 to €15,000 in 2008. It was completely abolished in 2009. The theater provided ambitious programming for the inhabitants of the northern districts of Marseille—including works by William Shakespeare, Molière, the Marquis de Sade, Victor Hugo, and Nikolai Gogol, as well as contemporary artists like Elfriede Jelinek, Romain Gary, Jean-Paul Sartre, Eugène Ionesco, Cirque Éloize, and Michel Jonasz—for just a few euros (€3 for those on social benefits, €7 for local residents). He gathered a petition of 85,000 signatures and formed a support committee including Michel Bouquet and Pierre Arditi. He embarked on a 12-day hunger strike that received significant media attention. Following a private meeting with then-Minister of Culture Frédéric Mitterrand, Martin's subsidy was reinstated.

In film and television, Martin worked under directors such as Roustam Ibraguimbekov, Michel Polac, René Lucot, Nat Lilenstein, Roger Kahane, Jacques Cornet, Bernard Queyzanne, Bernard Bouthier, Éric le Hung, Jean Dasque, Jacques Ordines, Jean Prat, Yves-André Hubert, Guy Lessertisseur, Gérard Clément, Jean-Louis Fournier, Yves Gautier, Claude Faraldo, Maurice Frydland, Yves Boisset, Bertrand Blier, and Oleg Fossenko. He played the lead role in Piège pour un fantôme (2010), directed by Rustam Ibragimbekov. The film won the 2011 Nika Award for "Best Film of the CIS and Baltic States."

He died on 16 October 2023 at the theater in Gardanne.
