= The Last Adventure (1967 film) =

1967 drama film directed by Robert Enrico

- Directed by: Robert Enrico
- Screenplay by: Robert Enrico; José Giovanni (dialogue); Pierre Pilegri (dialogue)
- Based on: The novel Les Aventuriers by José Giovanni
- Produced by: Gérard Beytout; René Pignières
- Starring: Alain Delon; Lino Ventura; Joanna Shimkus
- Cinematography: Jean Boffety
- Music by: François de Roubaix, arranged by Bernard Gérard (first assistant)
- Production company: Compagnia Generale Finzaiaria Cinematografica
- Distributed by: Societe Nouvelle De Cinematographie
- Release dates: 12 April 1967 (France); 14 April 1967 (Italy)
- Running time: 113 minutes
- Countries: France; Italy
- Language: French
- Box office: 3 120 412 admissions (France)

The Last Adventure (French: Les Aventuriers) is a 1967 adventure drama film directed by Robert Enrico and based on a novel by José Giovanni. Two men, Alain Delon and Lino Ventura, and a girl, Joanna Shimkus, escape setbacks in France to go in search of sunken treasure off the coast of Africa. It was a French-Italian co-production.

== Synopsis ==
Outside Paris, three people are pursuing their separate dreams. Roland is building his own racing car, but it blows up under test. His friend Manu is a stunt pilot, who loses his licence. They are befriended by Laetitia, an artist mounting her first exhibition, at which not a single work sells. Their dreams in ruins, and virtually broke, the three pool what's left of their resources and head for a place on the African coast where an aircraft full of loot came down in the sea.

As they are searching for the wreck, a man climbs aboard their boat and says he was the pilot. He helps them find the sunken plane, but after hauling up the treasure their boat is approached by men claiming to be police. In fact, they are mercenaries who plan to seize the treasure. A gun battle follows, in which the mercenaries are repelled but Laetitia is killed. Roland and Manu put Laetitia's body into a deep sea diving suit, and bury her at sea. Roland and Manu put the pilot ashore and head back to France with their booty. Finding Laetitia's young cousin, they give him her share of the proceeds.

Roland then decides to fulfil her last dream of living on the sea by creating a hotel and restaurant out of an abandoned sea fort. Manu decides to look up old friends in Paris and, spending lavishly, is spotted by the mercenaries who have been keeping watch on his former girlfriend's apartment. Evading them, he rushes to warn Roland in the fort. The mercenaries follow and, in a gun battle, Manu is killed after killing some opponents. Using a cache of guns and hand grenades left by the Germans in 1945, Roland kills the remaining mercenaries.

== Cast ==
- Lino Ventura as Roland Darbant
- Alain Delon as Manu Borelli
- Joanna Shimkus as Laetitia Weiss
- Serge Reggiani as pilot
- Hans Meyer as mercenary
- Valéry Inkijinoff

== Production ==
The film is partly shot on Fort Boyard, which becomes the stage of the final showdown.

== Reception ==
=== France ===
The film was popular at the French box office, being one of Delon's biggest hits of the 1960s.

=== United States ===
The movie was released in the US in 1969. The Los Angeles Times called the film "a rather formless and old fashioned display of sentimental heroics." However, The New York Times liked the film, saying it:

Has a surprise around every bend. Tightened and aimed a little more purposefully, this attractive French drama of two adventurer-pals and their lovely tag-along comrade, might have hit the jackpot. What it does have, under Robert Enrico's imaginative direction, is spontaneous flow, striking pictorial sweep and three people who become more credible and persuasive as the picture moves along... It is beautifully handled, with some superb color photography underwater and on shore, and a consistent air of fresh reality. Furthermore, Mr. Delon, Mr. Ventura and the delicious Miss Shimkus (the heroine of Mr. Enrico's "Zita") are interesting, likable and real.

== Spiritual successor and remakes ==
The movie only used the first half of the novel's plot. The second half was actually adapted into the film Law of Survival (1967) (La loi du survivant), starring Michel Constantin.

The film was remade in Japan in 1974 as The Homeless, starring Ken Takakura, Shintaro Katsu and Meiko Kaji.

In 2014 a second remake was made in Russia, titled The Adventurers which starred Konstantin Khabensky.

== Legacy ==
Excerpts of the film were used for the 2015 Christian Dior's "Eau Sauvage" cologne advertising campaign drawing on the legacy of Alain Delon.
