= Jean-Marie Pallardy =

French film director (1940–2024)

Jean-Marie Pallardy (16 January 1940 – 12 December 2024) was a French film director.

== Life and career ==
Pallardy first worked as a male model in the 1960s, before opting for a career change and directing softcore erotic pictures. He also tried his hand at crime fiction and adventure films, with mixed results. His most ambitious project to date is White Fire (1984), starring Robert Ginty and Fred Williamson, a film which has proved to be quite popular among camp aficionados. Pallardy's career dwindled in the 1980s, with the decline of France's exploitation cinema, and his films became few and far between.

One of his last films, The Donor, guest-starring David Carradine, was released straight to DVD in 2004.

Pallardy died on 12 December 2024, at the age of 84.
