= Michael Baldwin (designer) =

Michael Baldwin (died October 2014) was a British artist, writer, director, designer, actor and filmmaker who had a long and varied career ranging across theatre, film, TV and music video.

== Career ==
Baldwin was primarily known for his work in costume design for theatre, film and TV in the UK. His earliest known screen credit as a costume designer/consultant was for a 1963 TV adaptation of the play A Hole in the Head. His subsequent screen credits include the costumes for The Rolling Stones Rock and Roll Circus (1968), the 1973 Vincent Price black comedy Theatre of Blood, the 1972 Bette Davis film Madame Sin, and numerous British TV series including Special Branch (1973), Within These Walls (1974), Mind Your Language (1978), Dick Turpin (1979), the sci-fi miniseries Quatermass (1979), an episode of Tales of the Unexpected (1980), the children's fantasy series Worzel Gummidge (1981), for which he was nominated for a BAFTA award, and the movie-length pilot of the cult TV series Max Headroom (1985). One of his last screen credits as a costume designer was for the Richard Stanley sci-fi film Hardware (1990).

Baldwin also worked on the London theatre and burlesque scene as a writer, costume designer, director, actor and artist, as well as working in the theatrical agency business. He directed an erotic short film called Bronze and was a second unit director on the Australian WWII historical drama series Tanamera – Lion of Singapore (1989).

== Music video work ==
Baldwin worked extensively on the burgeoning UK pop music video scene of the 1980s, frequently acting as the costume designer for videos directed by Australian filmmaker Russell Mulcahy, who later formed the prominent video production partnership MGMM.

In addition to his celebrated design work, however, Baldwin gradually acquired a peculiar pop-culture notoriety (albeit anonymous) because he began making cameo appearances in some of the music videos on which he was working. Baldwin in effect became a kind of visual "trademark" of the Mulcahy/MGMM videos; he can be easily recognised in nearly all his appearances by his receding grey hair, grey beard, and glasses, and he was repeatedly cast in authority roles such as a judge, a teacher, or a parent. However, his identity remained unknown to the general public until a year after his death, when writer Christopher Bickel published an article about him on the Dangerous Minds website, in which Baldwin was finally identified.

One of Baldwin's first known appearances in a pop video was in Ultravox's "Vienna" in 1980. Between 1980 and 1983 he is known to have appeared as a featured extra in at least nineteen different Mulcahy/MGMM music videos, including Bonnie Tyler's "Total Eclipse of the Heart", Billy Joel's "Pressure", ABC's "The Look of Love", XTC's "Ball and Chain" and "Love Song" by Simple Minds.

== Music videos featuring Michael Baldwin ==
- "Vienna", Ultravox, 1980
- "Mirror Mirror", Dollar, 1981
- "Just Like Belgium", "Elton's Song", Elton John, 1981
- "Love Song", Simple Minds, 1981
- "Thunder in the Mountains", Toyah, 1981
- "The French Song", Joan Jett, 1891
- "Love Plus One", Haircut 100, 1982
- "Ball and Chain", XTC, 1982
- "Street Café", "Hey Little Girl", Icehouse, 1982
- "Black Coffee in Bed", Squeeze, 1982
- "She's Right on Time", "Pressure", Billy Joel, 1982
- "The Rhythm of the Jungle", The Quick, 1982
- "The Look of Love", ABC, 1982
- "Unconditional Love", Donna Summer, 1983
- "Saved by Zero", The Fixx, 1983
- "Total Eclipse of the Heart", Bonnie Tyler, 1983
