= Robert Enrico =

French film director and screenwriter (1931–2001)

Robert Georgio Enrico
- Born: 13 April 1931; Liévin, Pas-de-Calais, France
- Died: 23 February 2001 (aged 69)
- Occupation: film director scriptwriter

Robert Georgio Enrico (April 13, 1931 – February 23, 2001) was a French film director and scriptwriter best known for making the Oscar-winning short An Occurrence at Owl Creek Bridge (1961).

He was born in Liévin, Pas-de-Calais, in the north of France, to Italian immigrant parents, and died in Paris.

== Filmography as director ==
- Paradiso terrestre (1956) (co-director)
- Jehanne (1956)
- Thaumetopoea (1960)
- Thaumetopoea, la vie des chenilles processionnaires du pain et leur extermination contrôlée (1961)
- Chickamauga (1962)
- L'oiseau moqueur (1962)
- Montagnes magiques (1962)
- La Rivière du hibou (1962) – "An Occurrence at Owl Creek Bridge", episode of The Twilight Zone (1964)
- La Belle vie (1963) – Prix Jean Vigo
- Au coeur de la vie (1963) – feature film comprising the Ambrose Bierce adaptations La Rivière du hibou, Chickamauga, and L'oiseau moqueur
- Contre point (1964)
- Le Théâtre de la jeunesse: La redevance du fantôme (1965) (TV)
- Les Grandes Gueules (1966)
- Tante Zita (1967)
- Les aventuriers (1967)
- Ho! (1968)
- Boulevard du Rhum (1971)
- Un peu, beaucoup, passionnément... (1971)
- Les Caïds (1972)
- Le Secret (1974)
- Le vieux fusil (1975) – César Award for Best Film
- Un neveu silencieux (1977)
- Heads or Tails (1980)
- L'Empreinte des géants (1980)
- Au nom de tous les miens (1983)
- Au nom de tous les miens (1985) (TV miniseries)
- Zone rouge (1986)
- De guerre lasse (1987)
- La Révolution française (1989) (segment "Les Années Lumière")
- Le Hérisson (1989) (TV)
- Vent d'est (1993)
- Saint-Exupéry: La dernière mission (1996) (TV)
- Fait d'hiver (1999)
