= The Last Grenade =

1970 British film by Gordon Flemyng

- Original film poster
- Directed by: Gordon Flemyng
- Written by: James Mitchell; Kenneth Ware
- Based on: The Ordeal of Major Grigsby by John Sherlock
- Produced by: Josef Shaftel; Dimitri de Grunwald
- Starring: Stanley Baker; Alex Cord; Honor Blackman
- Cinematography: Alan Hume
- Edited by: Ann Chegwidden
- Music by: John Dankworth
- Production company: Lockmore Productions
- Distributed by: Cinerama Releasing Corporation
- Release date: March 1970
- Running time: 94 minutes
- Country: United Kingdom
- Language: English
- Budget: $5 million or £1,126,552

The Last Grenade is a 1970 British war film directed by Gordon Flemyng and starring Stanley Baker and Alex Cord as two soldiers of fortune, formerly comrades, who now find themselves on opposite sides. The cast also includes Richard Attenborough, Honor Blackman, Rafer Johnson, John Thaw, Andrew Keir, and Julian Glover. It was written by James Mitchell and Kenneth Ware based on John Sherlock's 1964 novel The Ordeal of Major Grigsby, and was the final feature film directed by Flemyng.

== Synopsis ==
Beginning in the Congo, a group of mercenaries led by British Major Harry Grigsby are due to be picked up by helicopters after completing a mission. As they board the choppers they are fired on from the helicopters by another group of mercenaries led by American Kip Thompson, who has been hired to change sides.

Recovering in the United Kingdom, Grigsby is recruited by the British government to take out Thompson, who has been hired by Red China to stir up trouble in the New Territories between Hong Kong and Red China. As neither nation wants open warfare with the other, each side hires expendable mercenaries. Grigsby recruits his surviving old crew including Joe Jackson, Terry Mitchell, Gordon Mackenzie, and Andy Royal.

In addition to fighting Thompson, Grigsby finds time to seduce the wife, Katherine, of his liaison, a British General Charles Whiteley.

== Cast ==
- Stanley Baker as Maj. Harry Grigsby
- Alex Cord as Kip Thompson
- Honor Blackman as Katherine Whiteley
- Richard Attenborough as Gen. Charles Whiteley
- Rafer Johnson as Joe Jackson
- Andrew Keir as Gordon Mackenzie
- Ray Brooks as Lt. David Coulson
- Julian Glover as Andy Royal
- John Thaw as Terry Mitchell
- Gerald Sim as Dr. Griffiths
- Philip Latham as Adams
- A. J. Brown as Governor
- Pamela Stanley as Governor's Lady
- Paul Dawkins as Commissioner Doyle
- Kenji Takaki as Te Ching

== Production ==
It was one of a series of films produced by Dimitri de Grunwald, who called The Last Grenade's commercial prospects "safe-ish". The film was shot at Shepperton Studios and on location in Spain and Hong Kong. The sets were designed by the art director Anthony Pratt. Stanley Baker was the star.

The film only uses names of the characters from John Sherlock's 1964 novel The Ordeal of Major Grigsby that was set in the Malayan Emergency in 1948. Sherlock co-wrote the original screenplay that was rewritten by James Mitchell. The working title of the film was Grigsby.

== Reception ==
The Monthly Film Bulletin wrote: "A chase thriller with pretensions – both Grigsby and Thompson are mercenary and twisted, and their personal vendetta is invested with all sorts of vague philosophical and political overtones which neither the writing nor the playing can sustain. Stanley Baker gives his familiar professional tough performance (and does make the character's obsession quite disturbing at times), but Alex Cord is allowed to milk his part outrageously and the stilted British couple, as played by Richard Attenborough and Honor Blackman, seem almost a throwback to the old Gainsborough days. The action sequences, full of explosions, chases through forests and close-up violence, are quite efficiently staged, but Gordon Flemyng's direction is as flamboyant and vulgar as it was in The Split."

Variety wrote: "'What could have been a reasonably good actioner (though never "big" enough for the Cinerama technique) has been badly marred by a flat predictability in plot, intrusion of an inept and, at times, ludicrously irrelevant romance and some quite dreadful dialog. This can be put down as a scriptwriters' miss. It may satisfy those content with desultory kicks but never raises the blood pressure, and may result in only average boxoffice response. The principal thesps seem mildly aware of this drawback and go through their chore in a lacklustre manner unexpected in such performers."

In The Radio Times Guide to Films Robert Sellers gave the film 2/5 stars, writing: "Stanley Baker never quite attained the heady heights his obvious talents deserved and by the 1970s was the forgotten star of British cinema. Films like this only accelerated his decline, a predictable revenge drama with plenty of explosions and fights but little cranial activity. Baker plays a tough mercenary who vows retribution against a traitorous ex-colleague. Along the way he falls for the charms of Honor Blackman in a subplot riddled with the kind of dialogue even soap operas would reject."
