= The McMasters =

1970 film by Alf Kjellin

- Directed by: Alf Kjellin
- Screenplay by: Harold Jacob Smith
- Produced by: Monroe Sachson; Dimitri de Grunwald
- Starring: Burl Ives; Brock Peters; David Carradine; Nancy Kwan
- Cinematography: Lester Shorr
- Edited by: Melvin Shapiro
- Music by: Coleridge-Taylor Perkinson
- Production companies: Distrifilm SA; JayJen Productions
- Distributed by: Chevron Pictures
- Release dates: August 7, 1970 (New York City); December 23, 1970 (Los Angeles)
- Running time: 90 minutes
- Country: United States
- Language: English

The McMasters is a 1970 American Western film directed by Alf Kjellin and starring Burl Ives, Brock Peters, David Carradine and Nancy Kwan.

Producer Monroe Sachson had made The Incident with Brock Peters and the two were looking around for another film to make together. The budget was around $2 million. The film was shot in New Mexico.

The film was cut by the US distributors, Chevron Pictures, and Peters, the writer and producer asked to have their names removed from the film. Ultimately, two versions of the film were released. For its NYC debut, it played in two different theatres, one showing the cut version, the other showing the director's cut.

== Plot ==
An ex-slave is given half-ownership of a farm following the Civil War. He can't find anyone to work for him until Native Americans help. Bigots try to shut him down.

== Cast ==
- Burl Ives as Neal McMasters
- Brock Peters as Benjamin "Benjie"
- David Carradine as White Feather
- Nancy Kwan as Robin
- Jack Palance as Kolby
- Dane Clark as Spencer
- John Carradine as Preacher
- L. Q. Jones as Russell
- R. G. Armstrong as Watson
- Alan Vint as Hank

== Novelization ==
Concurrent with the release of the film, Award Books published a novelization of the screenplay by Dudley Dean McGaughey under his primary by-line, Dean Owen.
