= Connecting Rooms =

1970 British film by Franklin Gollings

- Original British quad poster
- Directed by: Franklin Gollings
- Written by: Franklin Gollings
- Produced by: Franklin Gollings; Harry Field
- Starring: Bette Davis; Michael Redgrave; Alexis Kanner; Kay Walsh; Olga Georges-Picot
- Cinematography: John Wilcox
- Edited by: Jack Slade
- Music by: John Shakespeare
- Production company: Hemdale
- Distributed by: Paramount Pictures
- Release dates: May 1970 (US); May 9, 1971 (UK:Reading); April 27, 1972 (UK: London)
- Running time: 103 minutes
- Country: United Kingdom
- Language: English

Connecting Rooms is a 1970 British drama film directed, written and produced by Franklin Gollings and starring Bette Davis, Michael Redgrave and Leo Genn. The screenplay was based on the play The Cellist by Marion Hart.

== Plot ==
The plot explores the relationships shared by the residents of a seedy boarding house owned by dour Mrs. Brent. Among them are busker Wanda Fleming, who is flattered by the attention paid her by rebellious pop songwriter wannabe Mickey Hollister, and former schoolmaster James Wallraven, who has been accused of pedophilia and reduced to working as a janitor in an art gallery.

== Cast ==
- Bette Davis as Wanda Fleming
- Michael Redgrave as James Wallraven
- Alexis Kanner as Mickey Hollister
- Kay Walsh as Mrs. Brent
- Leo Genn as Dr. Norman
- Olga Georges-Picot as Claudia Fouchet
- Richard Wyler as Dick Grayson
- Mark Jones as Johnny
- Gabrielle Drake as Jean
- Brian Wilde as Ellerman
- John Woodnutt as doctor

== Production ==
The Paramount Pictures release was filmed on location in Bayswater in 1969. It was given a limited release in the United States in 1970, then had some regional UK showings in 1971 but only appeared in London in 1972.

Scenes in which Wanda Fleming played the cello featured close-ups of the hands of British classical cellist Amaryllis Fleming.

In a scene set in the West End theatre district, a theatre marquee lists "Margo Channing" as one of the cast of the play it is housing. This was the name of the character Bette Davis portrayed in All About Eve.

== Critical reception ==
David Mcgillivray wrote in The Monthly Film Bulletin: "Another doomed attempt to locate an old-fashioned, melodramatic romance in a contrived, contemporary setting. Franklin Gollings' script (based on an unpublished play) begins by dropping conspicuous clues as to the nature of the guilty secrets that are to draw the lonely tenants together. "People are very kind", remarks the cellist a propos the 'concert' she has just given; while the mere mention of teachers favouring one pupil more than the rest is enough to send the schoolmaster's teacup flying as he backs defensively into the sanctity of his bedsitter. ... And so the patchwork progresses, with Miss Davis and Alexis Kanner struggling sedulously to cap each other's mannerisms, until the inevitable ending sends the stars wandering arm in arm into the future."

Kine Weekly wrote: "The fact that the plot is novelettish is not necessarily a vice in a film. The four main characters are all firmly, if conventionally, drawn and their interaction makes for reasonable drama, though seasoned cinemagoers are likely to guess the faintly happy ending. The direction is leisurely, but some of the cutting seems too sharp. Bette Davis plays the part of Wanda, who is a lot older than she appears, in that unmistakable, forceful Bette Davis style. Michael Redgrave, who does, of course, know how schoolmasters act and react, is pathetically and sympathetically dispirited as Wallraven; and Alexis Kanner is suitably bright and nasty as Mickey. A clever cameo of the nosey, sex-starved landlady is given by Kay Walsh."

Time Out London wrote "Riddled with act and scene pauses ... it's a fairly classic condensation of several fetishistic concerns endemic to British cinema."

In The Radio Times Guide to Films Adrian Turner gave the film 2/5 stars, calling the film a "slightly bonkers drama" and adding: "It's all very 1930s except for the Swinging London appendages of pop stars and an air of kookiness."

Leslie Halliwell wrote "Aggressively dismal melodrama which would be hilarious if it were not so sadly slow and naive."

TV Guide called the film a "dull, sappy melodrama."
