= Madeleine Ozeray =

French actress (1908–1989)

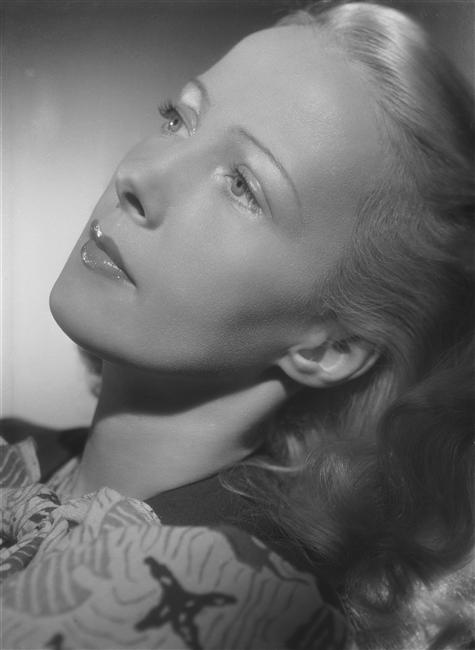
- Ozeray in 1947
- Born: Magdeleine Marie Catherine Elisabeth Ozeray; 13 September 1908; Bouillon-sur-Semois, Belgium
- Died: 28 March 1989 (aged 80); Paris, France
- Occupation: Actress
- Years active: 1931–1980
- Partner: Louis Jouvet (19?? – 1943)

Madeleine Ozeray (13 September 1908 – 28 March 1989) was a Belgian stage and film actress. She appeared in many films between 1932 and 1980.

== Biography ==
Magdeleine Marie Catherine Elisabeth Ozeray was born in Bouillon-sur-Semois, Belgium, to Camille Ozeray (1855–1938), a lawyer and Liberal member of parliament for the province of Luxembourg, and his wife, Marie Deymann. She studied at the Royal Conservatory of Brussels where she won first prize for comedy. At twenty-seven she joined the theater company of Louis Jouvet where she played the role of Helen in The Trojan War Will Not Take Place by Jean Giraudoux at the Théâtre de l'Athénée.

With her delicate grace, both fragile and fierce, she filled the role of Rosalie in the film On the Streets (1933), directed by Victor Trivas. In 1939, she appeared opposite Jouvet in the film The End of the Day directed by Julien Duvivier, in the role of young Jeannette. In April 1939, Jean Giraudoux's play Ondine opened in Paris with Ozeray in the title role.

In 2008, in celebration of the centenary of Ozeray's birth, Belgian journalist Dominique Zachary devoted an entire book to her, now the standard reference work, tracing the life and career of this celebrated actress.

== Death ==
Ozeray died in Paris at the age of 80 after a long illness. She is buried in the cemetery of her hometown of Bouillon.

== Partial filmography ==
- 1932: Une jeune fille et un million (directed by Fred Ellis and Max Neufeld) − Magda
- 1933: Un peu d'amour (directed by Hans Steinhoff) − Miette
- 1933: La dame de chez Maxim's (directed by Alexander Korda) − Clémentine
- 1933: On the Streets (directed by Victor Trivas) − Rosalie − la fille du père Schlamp
- 1933: Knock (directed by Louis Jouvet and Roger Goupillières) − Mariette
- 1933: La Guerre des valses (directed by Raoul Ploquin and Ludwig Berger) − Queen Victoria
- 1934: Casanova (directed by René Barberis) − Angelica
- 1934: Liliom (directed by Fritz Lang) − Julie Boulard / Liliom and Julie's daughter
- 1934: The House on the Dune (directed by Pierre Billon) − Pascaline
- 1934: Bar de nuit (Short)
- 1935: Le secret des Woronzeff (directed by André Beucler and Arthur Robison) − Nadia
- 1935: Crime et Châtiment (directed by Pierre Chenal) − Sonia
- 1935: Les Mystères de Paris (directed by Félix Gandéra) − Fleur–de–Marie
- 1935: Sous la griffe (directed by Christian-Jaque) − Pierrette
- 1936: Le Coupable (directed by Raymond Bernard) − Thérèse Forgeat
- 1937: La Dame de pique (directed by Fedor Ozep) − Lisa
- 1938: Ramuntcho (directed by René Barberis) − Gracieuse
- 1939: La Fin du jour (directed by Julien Duvivier) − Jeannette
- 1940: L'école des femmes (directed by Max Ophüls)
- 1945: The Music Master (Le Père Chopin) (directed by Fedor Ozep) − Madeleine Dupont
- 1973: Les Anges (directed by Jean Desvilles) − Lili
- 1974: La Pousse des feuilles (Short, directed by Francis Ramirez and Christian Rolot)
- 1974: La Race des seigneurs (directed by Pierre Granier-Deferre)
- 1975: Le Vieux Fusil (directed by Robert Enrico) − Julien's Mother
- 1978: M, cinquante huit (Short, directed by Jean−Claude Boussard)
- 1980: Chère inconnue (directed by Moshé Mizrahi) − Madame Thomas

== Theatre ==
- 1926: Au grand large, Hunt Sutton Vane; Comedie des Champs-Elysees
- 1933: Cette nuit là..., Lajos Zilahy, Théâtre de la Madeleine
- 1933: Mandarine, Jean Anouilh, Théâtre de l'Athénée
- 1934: Au grand large, Hunt Sutton Vane; Comedie des Champs-Elysees
- 1934: Tessa, la nymphe au cœur fidèle, Jean Giraudoux; Théâtre de l'Athénée
- 1935: La guerre de Troie n'aura pas lieu, Jean Giraudoux, Théâtre de l'Athénée
- 1936: L'École des femmes, Molière, Théâtre de l'Athénée
- 1937: Électre, Jean Giraudoux, Théâtre de l'Athénée
- 1937: L'Impromptu de Paris, Jean Giraudoux, Théâtre de l'Athénée
- 1938: Le Corsaire, Marcel Achard, Théâtre de l'Athénée
- 1939: Ondine, Jean Giraudoux, Théâtre de l'Athénée
- 1941: L'Occasion, Prosper Mérimée, Latin American tour
- 1942: On ne badine pas avec l'amour, 'Alfred de Musset, Latin American tour
- 1942: L'Apollon de Marsac, Jean Giraudoux, Latin American tour
- 1942: La Belle au bois, Jules Supervielle, Latin American tour
- 1942: L'Annonce faite à Marie, Paul Claudel, Latin American tour
- 1953: Le Chemin de crête, Gabriel Marcel, Theatre du Vieux-Colombier
- 1957: Au Paradis, Fernand Millaud, Théâtre des Arts
- 1959: La guerre de Troie n'aura pas lieu, Jean Giraudoux, Bellac Festival
- 1965: La Folle de Chaillot, Jean Giraudoux, Théâtre national de Chaillot
- 1971: La Folle de Chaillot, Jean Giraudoux, Bellac Festival
- 1971: Oscarine ou les tournesols, Liliane Wouters, Théâtre Daniel Sorano,
- 1973: Par-dessus bord, Michel Vinaver, Théâtre de l'Odéon
- 1976: Le Genre humain, Jean-Edern Hallier, Espace Cardin
