= Electra (Giraudoux play) =

1937 two-act play written by Jean Giraudoux

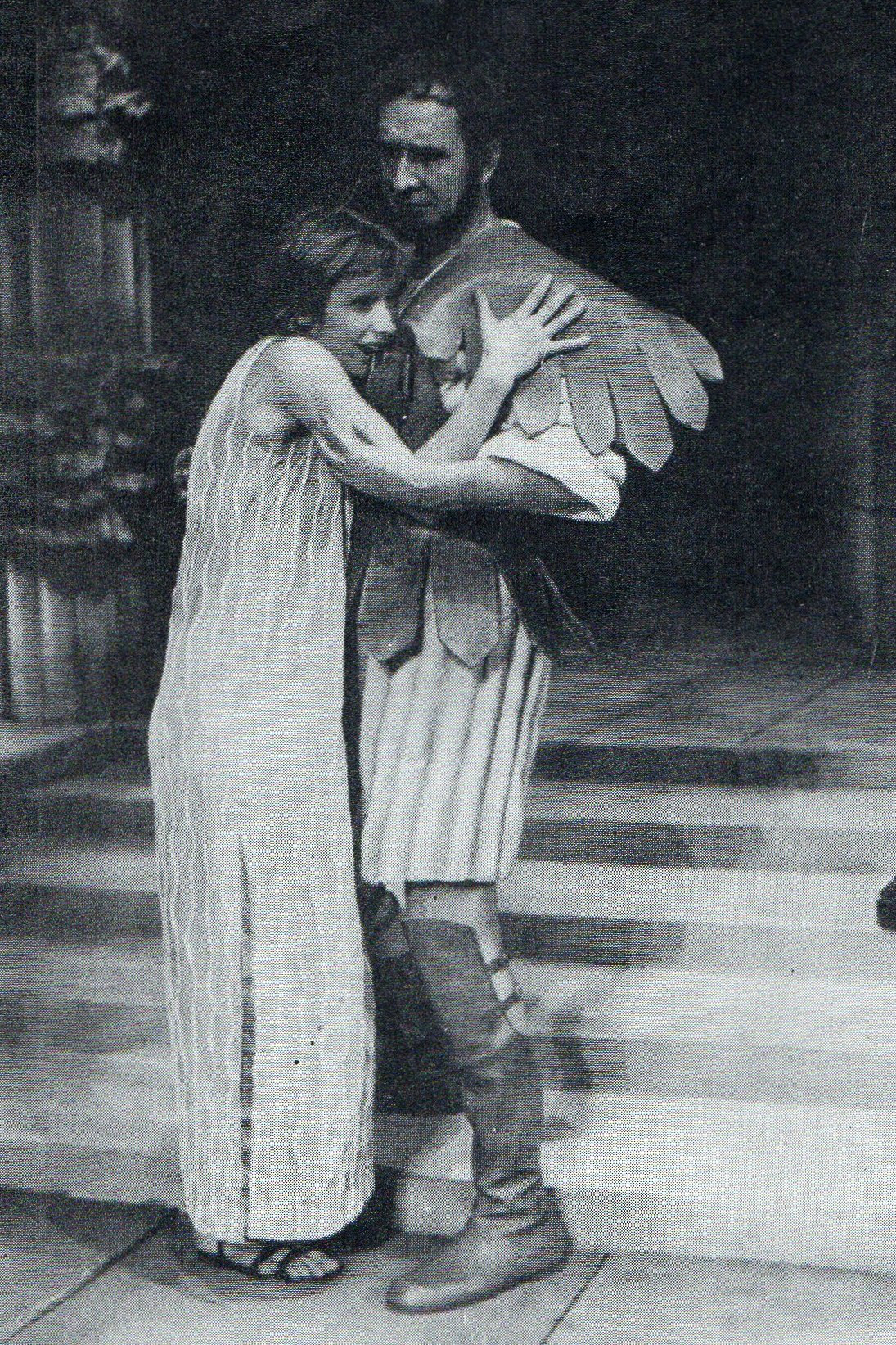
- Jadwiga Jankowska-Cieślak as Electra in Warsaw, 1973
- Written by: Jean Giraudoux
- Chorus: The Eumenides
- Characters: Agamemnon, Iphigenia, Clytemnestra, Aegisthus, Orestes, Electra
- Original language: French
- Subject: Electra and her brother Orestes plot revenge against their mother Clytemnestra and stepfather Aegisthus for the murder of their father, Agamemnon
- Genre: Tragedy
- Setting: Mythological ancient Greece

Premiere
- Date premiered: 13 May 1937
- Place premiered: Théâtre de l'Athénée in Paris

Electra (French title: Électre) is a two-act play written in 1937 by French dramatist Jean Giraudoux. It was the first Giraudoux play to employ the staging of Louis Jouvet. Based on the classic myth of antiquity, Electra has a surprisingly tragic force, without losing the spirit and sparkling humor that made Jean Giraudoux one of the most important playwrights of the mid twentieth century.

== Original productions ==
Électre was translated into English as Electra in 1955 by Winifred Smith, and again in 1964 by Phyllis La Farge and Peter H. Judd.

Électre was first performed on 13 May 1937 in Paris at the Théâtre de l'Athénée in a production by Louis Jouvet.

== Plot summary ==
Agamemnon, The King of Argos, had sacrificed his daughter Iphigenia to the gods. In revenge, his wife, Clytemnestra, assisted by her lover, Aegisthus, killed him on his return from the Trojan War. Orestes, the son was banished, but the second daughter Electra was allowed to remain: "She does nothing, says nothing. But she is there". As the play opens, Aegisthus wants to marry her to the palace gardener in order to deflect towards "the house of Théocathoclès anything that might cast an unfortunate light on the house of Atreus."

Electra, with the assistance of her easily dominated brother Orestes, who has returned from banishment, relentlessly seeks the murderer of her father, while feeling an implacable hatred for her mother. Eventually Electra and Orestes themselves are destroyed by the curse that follows the house of Atreus.

Giraudoux's play is a rewriting of the myth, taken from an epic passage in Homer's Odyssey. It had previously been rendered in tragedies by Aeschylus, Sophocles, and Euripides in the 5th century BC.

With many anachronistic changes, including the role of the bourgeois couple as a burlesque reflection of the tragic couple, Elektra is another example of the timelessness of the tragedy. Written in 1937, it would in effect be a "bourgeois tragedy", according to Jean Giraudoux himself.

== The quest for the truth ==
This is the main theme of the play. Electra comes from the Greek Elektra which means "light". Electra is there to shed light on the events, to illuminate the truth. Thanks to her presence, many characters will reveal "their" truth, such as Agathe in Act II, 6. In addition, Electra and Aegisthus declare themselves throughout the play.

The character of the beggar (at once god, beggar and director) helps restore the truth. It is he who explains how the story unfolds, who recounts the murder of Agamemnon, and also that of Aegisthus and Clytemnestra.

The last scene shows Electra, in restoring the truth, cursed and dispossessed, decimating the city. The splendor of this truth was too violent. The last line, "It has a beautiful name, Narses, it is called the dawn" ends the play on a delicious note of ambiguity.

== Characters ==
=== Characters ===
- Electra. The titular and central character. Daughter of Agamemnon and Clytemnestra, she hates her mother who killed her father with the help of her lover Aegisthus, who is now Regent to the throne. She awaits the arrival of Orestes in revenge.
- Orestes. Electra's brother, he was exiled while still young, after the murder of Agamemnon. Upon returning to his family, he appears as a mere alien.
- Clytemnestra. Queen of Argos; Mother of Electra and Orestes; Widow and murderer of Agamemnon.
- Aegisthus. Regent, he holds the power in the city of Argos. The play begins on the consequences of his ideas: Electra married the gardener, and thus deter the Gods of their views on the line of Atreus.
- The Chairman. Second President of the court, he cares for his peace and opposes Aegisthus.
- Agatha. President's wife, she is young and pretty, and decides to deceive her husband.
- The gardener. Future husband of Electra, he looks after the garden of the palace. He belongs to the same family as the President.
- The Eumenides. Girls at the beginning of the play, they grow several years in a few hours. They are related to the gods and justice.
- The Beggar. Enigmatic character: ((Citation | Never has there been a beggar as perfect as a beggar, as rumor has it that this must be a God)).
- Narses. Friend of the Beggar.

=== Other characters ===
- A young man
- A master
- The Butlers
- A groomsman
- Beggars

== Cast ==
- Renee Devillers: Electra
- Gabrielle Dorziat: Clytemnestra
- Madeleine Ozeray: Agatha
- Raymone: Women Narses
- Martha Herlin: Fury
- Monique Mélinand: Fury
- Pezzani Denise: Fury
- Vera Perez: Little Fury
- Nicole Fitted Berny: Little Fury
- Clairette Fournier: Little Fury
- Louis Jouvet: The Beggar
- Pierre Renoir: Aegisthus
- Romain Bouquet: President
- Paul Cambo: Orestes
- Alfred Adam: The Gardener
- John Deninx: the young man
- Robert Bogar: Captain
- Maurice Castel: best man
- Julien Barrot: butler
- René Belloc: butler
- Andre Moreau: beggar
