= Frères Isola =

Les Frères Isola refers to brothers:

- Émile Isola (1860–1945)
- Vincent Isola (1862–1947), Algerian-born conjurers and theatre directors
