= Song of Songs (Giraudoux) =

English adaptation of the play Cantique des Cantiques

- Written by: Jean Giraudoux
- Characters: The President, Florence; Jerome, The Manager, The Cashier, The Waiter
- Original language: French
- Subject: The bittersweet end of an affair
- Genre: Tragedy
- Setting: A cafe in Paris, 1935

Premiere
- Date premiered: 12 October 1938
- Place premiered: Comedie Française in Paris

Song of Songs is an English adaptation of the play Cantique des Cantiques written in 1938 by the French dramatist Jean Giraudoux.

== Plot summary ==
The President is at a table of in Parisian cafe waiting for his young lover, Florence. When she arrives she announces that she is going to marry Jerome, a young man she has just met.

== Original productions ==
Cantique des Cantiques was translated into English by John Raikes, in the Tulane Drama Review (1959), and by Herma Briffault, in Barry Ulanov, Makers of Modern Theatre (1961).

Cantique des Cantiques was first performed on 12 October 1938 in Paris at the Comedie Française in a production by Louis Jouvet.
