= The Enchanted (play) =

1950 English adaptation by Maurice Valency of the play Intermezzo

- Original language: French
- Written by: Jean Giraudoux
- Characters: The Mayor, Isobel, The Doctor, The Ghost, The Inspector, The Supervisor, Armande Mangebois, Leonide Mangebois, Gilberte, Daisy, Lucy, Viola, Denise, Irene, Marie-Louise
- Subject: A provincial town is haunted by a ghost
- Genre: Drama
- Setting: A clearing in the woods, Limousin in France

Premiere
- Date: 27 February 1933
- Place: Comedie des Champs-Elysees in Paris

The Enchanted is a 1950 English adaptation by Maurice Valency of the play Intermezzo written in 1933 by French dramatist Jean Giraudoux.

== Original productions ==
Intermezzo was translated into English as The Enchanted by Maurice Valency, in Jean Giraudoux, Four Plays, vol. 1 (1958), and by Roger Gellert, in Jean Giraudoux, Plays, vol. 2 (1967).

Intermezzo was first performed on 27 February 1933 in Paris at the Comedie des Champs-Elysees in a production by Louis Jouvet.

Maurice Valency's adaptation The Enchanted opened at New York's Lyceum Theatre on 18 January 1950 in a production staged by George S. Kaufman, starring Leueen MacGrath, Malcolm Keen, and John Baragrey.
