= The Apollo of Bellac =

1942 comedic one-act play by Jean Giraudoux

- Original language: French
- Written by: Jean Giraudoux
- Characters: Agnes, Therese, Clerk, The Man from Bellac, The Vice President, Mr Cracheton, Mr Lepedura, Mr Rasemutte, Mr Schultz, The President, Miss Chevredent
- Subject: A young woman learns the secret of how to handle men
- Genre: Comedy
- Setting: The reception room of The International Bureau of Inventions

Premiere
- Date: 16 June 1942
- Place: Municipal Theater in Rio de Janeiro

The Apollo of Bellac (French: L'Apollon de Bellac or L'Apollon de Marsac) is a comedic one-act play written in 1942 by French dramatist Jean Giraudoux.

== Plot summary ==
The play is set in the reception room of the International Bureau of Inventions, during autumn in Paris. It focuses on a timid, young woman by the name of Agnes. After she arrives, she is given the most powerful secret in life by a homeless man from the little town of Bellac. Like Giraudoux himself, the man comes from the Limousin region of France.

The secret he gives her is to tell all men that they are beautiful ("How beautiful you are!" or "Comme vous êtes beau!") and they will play right into your hands. She quickly catches on and the men of the Bureau fall for her left and right. In the Valency translation, it ends with her meeting the handsome (and single) Chairman of the Board, and everyone wondering what has happened to the great man (the homeless inventor) who quietly slipped away.

== Cast and productions ==
L'Apollon de Bellac was translated into English by Maurice Valency, in Jean Giraudoux, Four Plays, vol. 1 (1958), and 1957 by Ronald Duncan.

The Apollo of Bellac was first performed as L'Apollon de Marsac on 16 June 1942 at the Municipal Theater in Rio de Janeiro.

The first performance in Paris was on 19 April 1947 at the Théâtre de l'Athénée in a production by Louis Jouvet. Cast at the Paris premiere included Dominique Blanchar, as Agnes; Lucienne Bogaert, as Therese; Louis Jouvet, as "The Man from Bellac"; and Jacques Monod, as Mr Cracheton.

In 1955, in Tony Richardson's directing début, the play was produced for Television with Denholm Elliott and Natasha Parry in the main roles. Richardson would also direct the stage play two years later, with Richard Pasco and Heather Sears.

"The moment [The Man] is cast as a big beautiful man with curly ringlets, the play is spoiled."—Maurice Valency
