= Ondine (play) =

Play by Jean Giraudoux

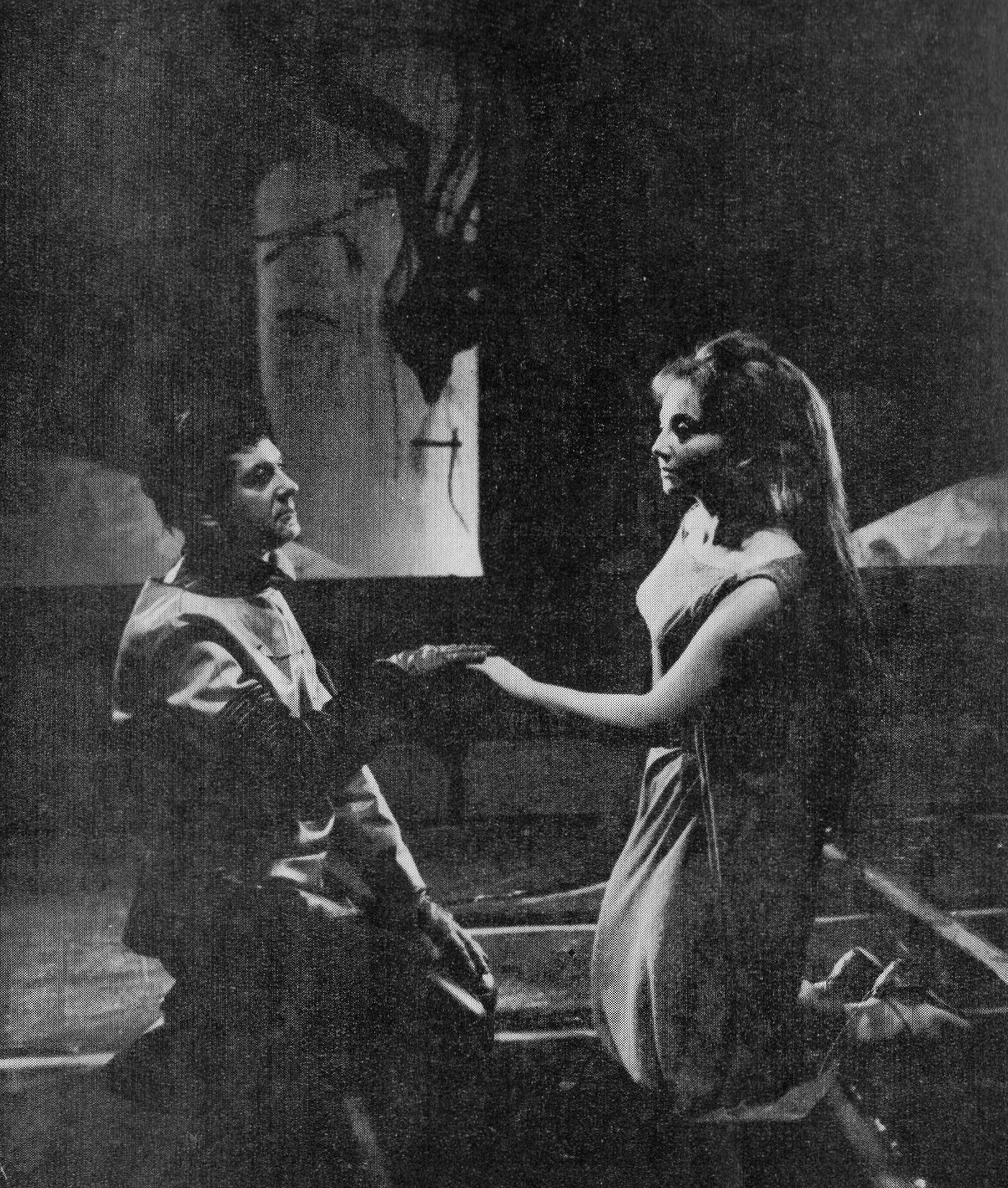
- Jan Żardecki and Joanna Jedlewska in Ondine, Warsaw, 1965
- Original language: French
- Written by: Jean Giraudoux
- Subject: Ondine, a water-sprite, falls in love with and marries a mortal, the knight-errant Hans
- Genre: Drama
- Setting: Middle Ages; Germany

Premiere
- Date: 1939
- Place: Théâtre de l'Athénée in Paris

Ondine is a play written in 1938 by French dramatist Jean Giraudoux, based on the 1811 novella Undine by the German Romantic Friedrich de la Motte Fouqué that tells the story of Hans and Ondine. Hans is a knight-errant who has been sent off on a quest by his betrothed. In the forest he meets and falls in love with Ondine, a water sprite who is attracted to the world of mortal man. The subsequent marriage of people from different worlds is, of course, folly.

== Characters ==
- Auguste
- Eugenie
- Ondine
- Hans
- The Old One
- Lord Chamberlain
- The Superintendent of the Theatre
- The Trainer of the Seals
- Violante
- Angelique
- Bertha
- Bertram
- The King
- A Servant
- First Fisherman
- First Judge
- Second Judge
- The Kitchen Maid

== Plot summary ==
=== Act 1 ===
The play opens in a fisherman's hut near a lake in the forest. Outside a storm rages. Here live the old fisherman Auguste and his wife Eugenie. And here lives Ondine whom the old couple found as a baby at the edge of the lake, and brought up in place of their own daughter who was mysteriously snatched away as an infant. Auguste is upset because Ondine is out somewhere in the storm. As Auguste rages, naiads, the wind, and even the King of the Ondines himself (throughout the play referred to as the Old One) peer in at the windows gently mocking Auguste. Evidently this is not unusual—the old couple are well aware that Ondine is "not like anyone else".

A knight-errant, Hans von Wittenstein zu Wittenstein, arrives seeking shelter and he is welcomed. While he is in the midst of telling Auguste and Eugenie about his betrothal to the princess Bertha, Ondine appears. On seeing Hans she says, "How beautiful he is!" In spite of taunts from Ondine's sister naiads, and against the advice of Auguste, Hans immediately falls in love with Ondine. All thought of Bertha, his "dark angel" — the woman who sent him off on his quest — is banished. Ondine in turn swears eternal love for Hans. The Old One warns her, "The man will deceive you. He will abandon you." Ondine does not believe him. He gives a final warning "You will remember our pact." Ondine reluctantly agrees.

=== Act 2 ===
In the great hall of the king's palace, it is the day that Hans is to present his bride Ondine at court. The Lord Chamberlain, who needs to arrange an entertainment for the day's ceremonies, is in conference with the director of the royal theater, the trainer of the seals, and the Illusionist (in actuality the King of the Ondines). Soon they are joined by the poet Bertram and several ladies of the court. The Illusionist says he will arrange a little private entertainment while they are waiting. As to what they would like to see, everyone is curious to see what will happen when Hans and the embittered Bertha finally meet after avoiding each other for three months. The Illusionist says he can arrange for this event to take place at once. Bertram objects asking, "Why are we doing this evil thing?" The Chamberlain cynically replies, "Sooner or later it would have to happen. That's life." They all conceal themselves behind a pillar and watch as the inevitable events unfold. Hans and Bertha meet. Bertha manipulates Hans with guilt. The Illusionist gives the spectators a further glimpse into the future showing them the scene when Hans realizes that he married the wrong woman. Bertha intimately knows the Wittenstein family history, she plays the lute, she recites, she illuminates manuscripts—she is the perfect woman. When Bertha asks Hans what Ondine does that might advance her husband's interests at court, he replies, "Oh, she swims. Occasionally."

Continuing the play-within-a-play structure, the Illusionist presents the remaining events of the day in scenes which the astonished participants themselves watch from behind the pillar. The Chamberlain just has time to prepare Ondine for her reception with the king. Ondine is particularly advised not to mention the wart on the king's nose. Ondine tactlessly mentions that the Chamberlain's hand is damp and constantly interrupts him to talk to Bertram with whom she immediately establishes a rapport. At the king's reception Ondine cannot take her eyes off Bertha. She accuses Bertha of trying to steal Hans from her. The King says, "Bertha only wants to be your friend." Ondine replies, "You are entirely mistaken! Bertha is a hypocrite. She flatters you constantly. Has she ever dared to speak to you about...the wart on your nose?" In panic, the Chamberlain clears the room. Ondine is alone with the king. The king asks, "Who are you, Ondine?" Ondine explains everything and says that she weeps because "they are trying to take Hans away from me." "But what if they did", the king asks. "Would that be such a misfortune?" Ondine answers, "Oh yes. If he deceives me, he will die." The king says, "Men have been known to survive such things." "Not this one", Ondine replies.

The Illusionist has one more scene. Bertha is revealed to be not a princess, but the long lost daughter of Auguste and Eugenie. When Bertha refuses to acknowledge her true parents, the king banishes her until she apologizes. She leaves sobbing, but at Ondine's urging, she is soon forgiven. After the events of this disastrous day, Ondine laments, "Oh, how difficult it is to live among you, where what has happened can never again not have happened. How terrible to live where a word can never be unspoken and a gesture can never be unmade."

=== Act 3 ===
Act Three takes place in the courtyard of castle of the Wittenstein. Five years have passed. Hans has deceived Ondine with Bertha, and Ondine has long since vanished. It is the morning of the day of the marriage of Bertha and Hans. But Hans is troubled. He tells Bertha, that she should have married a man full of pride and joy. He complains, "Oh Bertha, how she lied to me, that woman!" Bertha points out that Ondine was no woman, "you married a creature of another world. You must forget her." Hans remembers the day that Ondine left and asks, "But why does she proclaim to the world that she deceived me with Bertram?" In addition to being preoccupied with Ondine, Hans is worried because the servants are starting to speak in poetry and there is a Wittenstein legend that this always happens just before misfortune strikes. Two fishermen arrive. The second fisherman is the Old One. They have caught Ondine. Two judges from the inquisition are summoned and immediately put her on trial. Ondine is brought in draped in the net in which she was caught. She does not deny being an Ondine and proclaims to all who will listen that she deceived Hans with Bertram. The judge asks Hans to clearly state the exact nature of his complaint. Hans says, "My complaint? My complaint is the complaint of all mankind. I claim the right to be left in peace in a world that is free of intrusions by these creatures. Has there never been an age when they did not afflict us?" The judge answers, "An age? There has never been a moment." But the other judge says, "Yes, there was once a moment. For that instant, the whole world was single-hearted, at play, at peace — and yet I tasted for the first time a certain loneliness."

As the trial progresses it becomes clear that Hans is still in love with Ondine. Ondine, in a vain attempt to get out of her pact with the Old One (Hans must die because he deceived Ondine with Bertha) continues to insist that she deceived Hans first with Bertram. Bertram is summoned and supports Ondine's story. But no-one believes them, least of all the second fisherman. Ondine is accused of sorcery. The Old One leaps to her defense saying, "This woman could call upon the earth and the heavens to do her bidding. But she gave up her power to be human. Write this into your record, Judge — this Ondine was the most human being that ever lived. She was human by choice." In the end the judges decide that Ondine transgressed the boundaries of nature, but in so doing she brought only kindness and love. So they are compassionate in merely sentencing her to death while sparing her a public execution. The earthly judges have no power over Ondine, however, and as the executioner attempts to lead her away, the Old One waves him off.

But Hans must die because of the original pact between the Old One and Ondine. The Old One says kindly to Ondine, "If you wish, I will let him die at the same moment that you forget him." Hans and Ondine have one last moment of tenderness. Her sisters will call Ondine three times, and then she will forget everything. Hans laments that their parting will be "a real farewell, a farewell forever. Not like those lovers who part, but are destined to be reunited again in the afterlife. We part for eternity, we go to different worlds." They recall their first meeting, the night Hans came out of the storm. Ondine recalls that she said, "In after years we shall have this hour to remember. The hour before you kissed me." Hans says, "I can't wait. Now, Ondine. Kiss me now." As they kiss, the third Ondine calls. Hans dies. Ondine looks around in puzzlement. She asks, "Who is this handsome young man lying here, can you bring him back to life, Old One?" He replies, "Impossible." As the curtain falls Ondine says, "What a pity! How I should have loved him!"

== Themes ==
Ondine is a medieval love story of a water nymph and a knight, and the folly that results from their union. The playwright tells the tale of this doomed relationship in a theatrical fantasy where charming fable mingles with the rigor of classical tragedy.

In one view the story of Ondine and Hans is a class drama. Maurice Valency puts it: "A young man of good family is engaged to a girl of his own class. He suddenly becomes infatuated with a blonde of an inferior class and, impulsively, he marries this girl. But she doesn't make him happy, and after the vicissitudes usual in such cases of misalliance, the young man goes back to his first love, a brunette who is socially most acceptable. He is now in a predicament. He cannot live without the blonde; the brunette is indispensable to his happiness, and, torn apart by these two loves, the man dies."

Giraudoux based his tale on the 1811 novella Undine by the German Romantic Friedrich de la Motte Fouqué. The theme of the water nymph who seeks to gain a soul while in human form is a typical fairy tale, and is also found in the Celtic myth of Melusine. Giraudoux explains that the theme of Ondine is "the liaison of man with the natural elements, the flirtation of the natural world with the kingdom of man." The story bears a fairly close resemblance to de la Motte Fouqué's original tale, but, "Instead of being the story of a water-sprite who marries a man to acquire a soul, the play becomes the tragedy of man divorced from nature and stultified by his confinement within the strictly human sphere."

Dorothy Knowles remarked that "Ondine is a force of nature but also love incarnate, and Hans's tragedy is that he is as unequal to such a love as he is to the revelations of nature which Ondine brings."

In Laurent LeSage's words, "No elemental spirit, she [Ondine] is a glimpse of a better and purer world ... But if man dreams of such love which turns life into paradise, he cannot endure its reality," adding that the closing scenes "constitute a remarkably poignant lovers' farewell ... The play closes on a beautiful love poem."

Donald Inskip wrote there "is about Ondine a completeness, a sense of fully-rounded achievement, accompanied by an all-pervading if gentle melancholia gripping audience and actors alike, which puts this play in a category of its own ... The naive and the ultra sophisticated are blended here in such a manner as to blur the frontiers of human experience and transport audiences completely out of themselves."

== Critical reception ==
Drama historian Philip George Hill called the 1954 Broadway production "a work of extraordinary beauty".

"Giraudoux's lines, imaginatively adapted by Maurice Valency, glint with romantic gems... [and] exotic verbal nuggets..." (Milton Shulman, Evening Standard, January 13, 1961)

"With Giraudoux's lyrical insights and elegiac phrasing, his plays read like a combination of epic poetry and a Henry James novel. The characters and situations are hyperbolic, mythical, biblical and canonical, and yet the text contains disorienting psychological insight" (Julia Jonas in a 2004 review).

"Impulsive, frank and filled with wonder, Ondine is a creature of water and air, riding the storm at night, spontaneously performing little feats of magic ... delivers nearly three hours of pure magic and philosophy" (Sylvie Drake in a 1993 review).

== Original productions ==
Ondine was first performed on April 27, 1939 in Paris at the Théâtre de l'Athénée in a production by Louis Jouvet with a cast including Jeanne Hardeyn, Louis Jouvet, Madeleine Ozeray, Simone Bourday and Alexandre Rignault. Costumes were designed by Rostislav Doboujinsky.

Ondine was first translated into English by Maurice Valency, and later by Roger Gellert in 1967 and by Dan O'Brien in 2007.

The play was adapted by Maurice Valency, opening on Broadway in 1954 in a production by Alfred Lunt, starring Mel Ferrer, John Alexander, Alan Hewitt, Robert Middleton, Marian Seldes, Lloyd Gough, and, in the title role, Audrey Hepburn in the role that won her a Tony Award for Best Actress, (the same year she was awarded an Oscar for Best Actress in the film Roman Holiday). The play won the 1954 New York Drama Critics' Circle, Best Foreign Play. Alfred Lunt garnered the 1954 Tony Award for Best Director.

The London production of Ondine was presented by the Royal Shakespeare Company in 1961, directed by Peter Hall, with Leslie Caron in the title role. The rest of the cast included Richard Johnson, Diana Rigg, Eric Porter, Clive Swift, Siân Phillips, Gwen Ffrangcon-Davies, Roy Dotrice, Ian Holm and Peter Jeffrey.

Dan O'Brien's translation of Ondine was first presented at the Rand Theater by the University of Massachusetts Amherst Theater Department in 2008.

We Players presented Ondine outside Sutro Baths and Sutro Heights Park (San Francisco, California). This site-integrated production ran in 2015 using the original English translation by Maurice Valency, co-directed by Carly Cioffi and Ava Roy.

== Awards and nominations ==
=== Original Broadway production ===
Year	Award	Category	Nominee	Result
1954	New York Drama Critics' Circle Award	Best Foreign Play	Jean Giraudoux, Maurice Valency	Won
1954	Tony Award	Best Actress in a Play	Audrey Hepburn	Won
1954	Tony Award	Best Scenic Design	Peter Larkin	Won
1954	Tony Award	Best Costume Design	Richard Whorf	Won
1954	Tony Award	Best Director	Alfred Lunt	Won
