= Comédie-Parisienne =

Comédie-Parisienne may refer to:

- Théâtre Antoine-Simone Berriau, a theatre in Paris which had the name in 1881
- Théâtre de l'Athénée, a theatre in Paris which had the name from 1893 to 1896
