= The Virtuous Island =

1956 English adaptation by Maurice Valency of the play Supplément au voyage de Cook

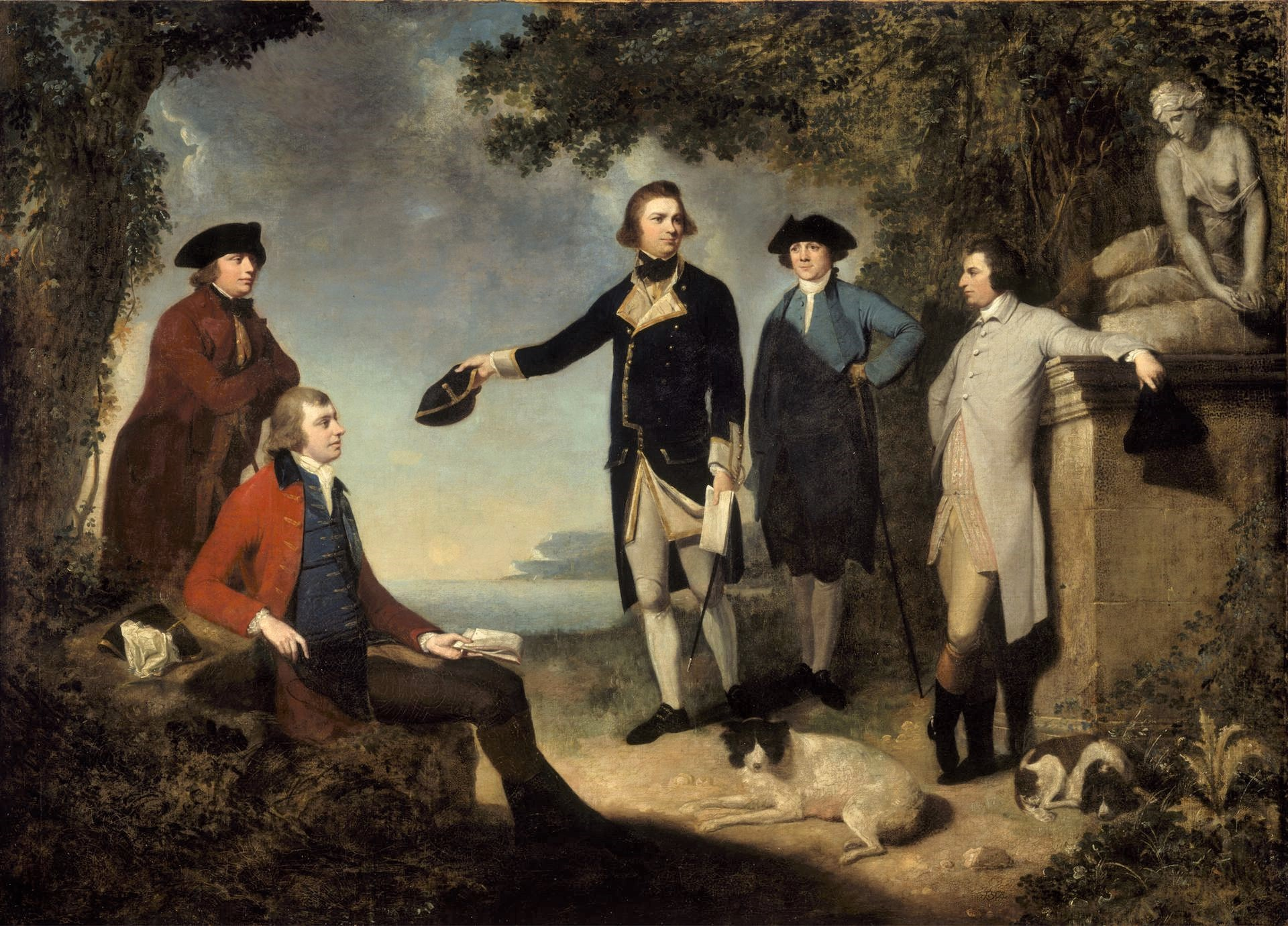
- Captain James Cook, Sir Joseph Banks, et al. By John Hamilton Mortimer, 1771
- Original language: French
- Written by: Jean Giraudoux
- Characters: Mr Banks, Outourou, Tahiriri, Mrs Banks, Valao, Matamua, Vaiturou, A native Tahitian, The Lieutenant
- Subject: Captain Cook visits Tahiti
- Genre: Satirical drama
- Setting: Tahiti

Premiere
- Date: 21 November 1935
- Place: Théâtre de l'Athénée in Paris

The Virtuous Island is a 1956 English adaptation by Maurice Valency of the play Supplément au voyage de Cook written in 1935 by French dramatist Jean Giraudoux.

== Original productions ==
Supplément au voyage de Cook was translated into English as The Virtuous Island (1956) by Maurice Valency.

Supplément au voyage de Cook was first performed on 21 November 1935 in Paris at the Théâtre de l'Athénée in a production by Louis Jouvet.
