= Siegfried (play) =

Play by Jean Giraudoux

- Written by: Jean Giraudoux
- Characters: Siegfried, Eva, Jacques, Zelten, Genevieve
- Original language: French
- Subject: An injured French soldier with amnesia becomes a German
- Genre: Drama
- Setting: the Siegfried residence, a frontier railroad station

Premiere
- Date premiered: 3 May 1928
- Place premiered: Comédie des Champs-Élysées in Paris

Siegfried is a play written in 1928 by French dramatist Jean Giraudoux, adapted from his own 1922 novel, Siegfried et le Limousin. The novel had launched Giraudoux's literary career, and the play based upon it established his reputation as a playwright. "It [Siegfried] marked the beginning of a productive, lifelong collaboration with actor-director Louis Jouvet, whom Giraudoux credits with transforming his literary plays into theater pieces."

== Original productions ==
Siegfried was translated into English in 1930 by Philip Carr and again in 1964 by Phyllis La Farge and Peter H. Judd.

Siegfried was first performed on 3 May 1928 in Paris at the Comedie des Champs-Élysées in a production by Louis Jouvet.

== Plot ==
We are introduced to Siegfried as the new national hero of Germany, an amnesiac survivor of World War I, who sprang from unknown origins to lead the country into a new period of modernization and prosperity. Baron von Zelten opposes Siegfried's project, loving the old German folk traditions. He also is one of the only Germans to know the truth about the new leader: he is actually a French soldier and writer, Jacques Forestier. A field nurse, Eva, had nursed him back to health knowing his real nationality, but took advantage of his amnesia to reeducate him as a German. In hopes of preserving the cultural heritage of his people, Zelten brings Siegfried's lover, Geneviève, to the German town of Gotha, ostensibly to give lessons in French, but really in hopes that she may restore his memory. Ironically, Zelten and Geneviève dash Siegfried's self-conception as the symbol of a new Germany precisely by revealing the soldier's true identity. A struggle ensues between the notion of identity as defined by one's birth and blood ties, and the idea that identity is something one can create in a vacuum; Eva and Geneviève take these opposing points-of-view, attempting to help the national hero of Germany. In the course of the political turmoil that results, Zelten is banished, but Siegfried leaves to resume his old life in France with Geneviève.
