= Les Gracques =

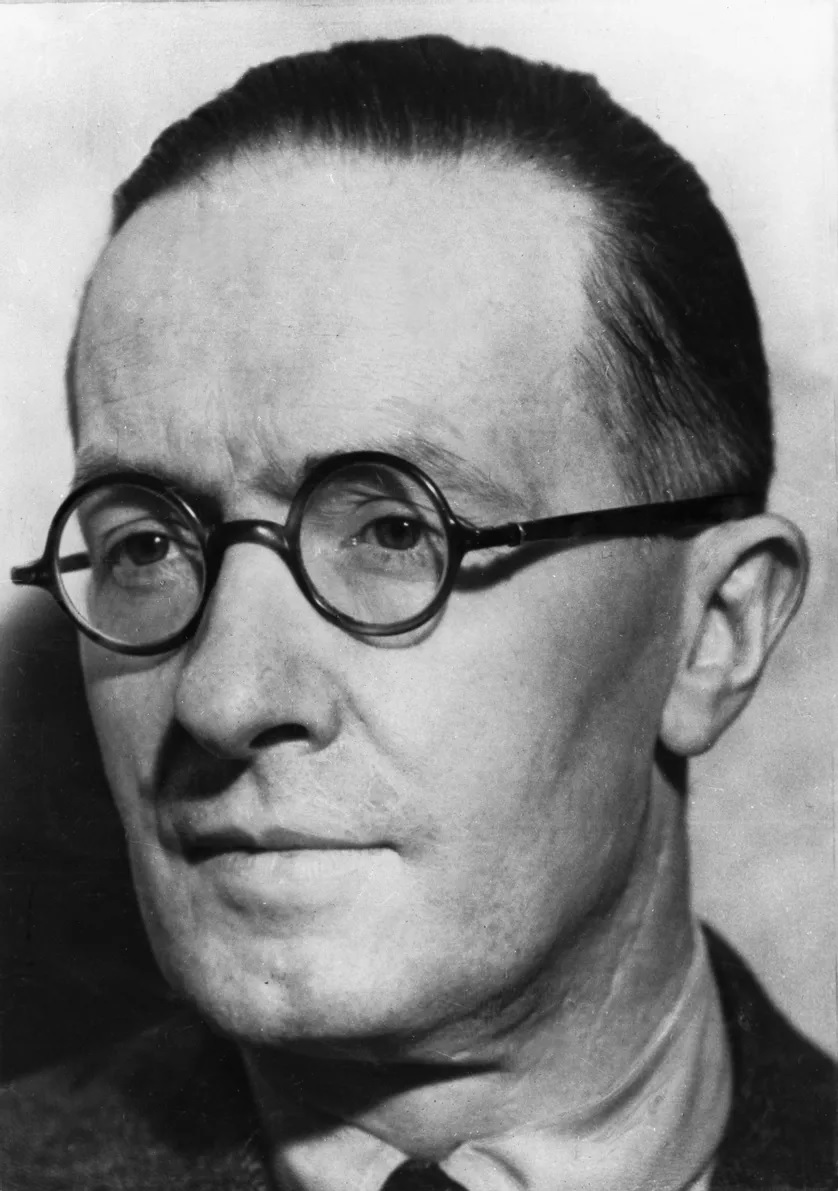
- Jean Giradoux, 1930
- Written by: Jean Giraudoux
- Original language: French
- Genre: Drama

Les Gracques is an unfinished play by Jean Giraudoux published after the author's death.

== Original productions ==
Les Gracques was published posthumously in 1958 by Éditions Grasset jointly with the novel La Menteuse (English title: The Liar).
