= Ramuntcho (1938 film) =

1938 film

- Directed by: René Barberis
- Written by: Emile Allard; René Barberis
- Based on: Ramuntcho by Pierre Loti
- Produced by: Pierre Chichério
- Starring: Paul Cambo; Louis Jouvet; Madeleine Ozeray
- Cinematography: Nikolai Toporkoff
- Music by: Marceau Van Hoorebecke
- Production company: F.I.C.
- Distributed by: Réalisation d'art cinématographique
- Release date: 24 February 1938
- Running time: 89 minutes
- Country: France
- Language: French

Ramuntcho is a 1938 French drama film directed by René Barberis and starring Paul Cambo, Louis Jouvet and Madeleine Ozeray. It is based on Pierre Loti's 1897 novel of the same title. It was shot at the Studios de la Seine in Paris. The film's sets were designed by the art director Eugène Lourié.

== Synopsis ==
In the French Basque Country, smuggler Ramuntcho is engaged to the attractive Gracieuse, despite the fierce opposition of her family. He goes away to do his military service in Indochina and returns to discover that she has now entered a convent.

== Cast ==
- Paul Cambo as Ramuntcho
- Louis Jouvet as Itchoua
- Madeleine Ozeray as Gracieuse
- Line Noro as Franchita
- Allamon as Fiorentino
- Françoise Rosay as Dolorès Detcharry
- Jean Brochard as Boulinguet
- Nino Constantini as Le brigadier
- Blanche Denège as La bonne mère
- Paul Dutourrier as Un contrebandier
- Jacques Erwin as Arrochkoa
- Gabrielle Fontan as Pilar Doyamboru
- René Génin as Le curé
- Jean Heuzé as Un officier
- Tony Murcie as Marco
- Suzanne Nivette as Une soeur
- Odile Rameau as Pantchika
- Raymone as La voisine
- Georges Saillard as Le capitaine
- Jean Témerson as Salaberry
- Michèle Alfa
- Jean Aquistapace
- Marie Dena
- Frances Machnik
- Luis Mariano (singing voice)
- N. Morgillo
- Pierre Simonet
- Luong Van Yen

== Bibliography ==
- Philippe Rège. Encyclopedia of French Film Directors, Volume 1. Scarecrow Press, 2009.
