= Albert Carré =

French theatre director (1852-1938)

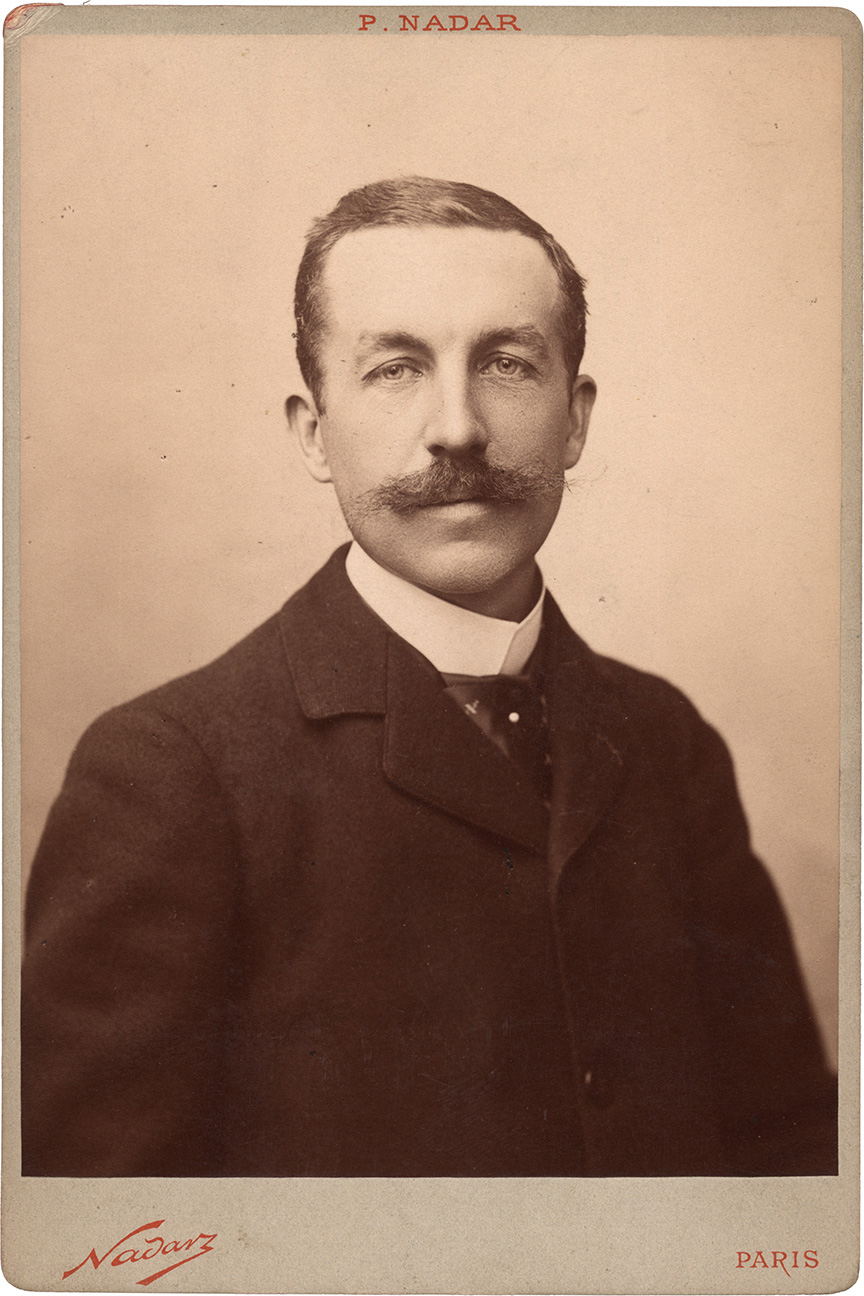
- Albert Carré
- Born: 22 June 1852; Strasbourg, France
- Died: 12 December 1938 (aged 86); Paris, France
- Occupations: Theatre & opera director, actor
- Spouse(s): Marguerite Carré (m. 1902; div. 1924) Marguerite Carré (m. 1929)
- Children: 1 daughter
- Relatives: Michel Carré (uncle); Michel Carré (cousin)

Albert Carré (French pronunciation: [albɛʁ kaʁe]; 22 June 1852 in Strasbourg – 12 December 1938 in Paris) was a French theatre director, opera director, actor and librettist. He was the nephew of librettist Michel Carré (1821–1872) and cousin of cinema director Michel Carré (1865–1945). His wife was the French soprano Marguerite Carré (1880–1947).

For over 50 years Albert Carré was a central personality in the theatrical and musical life of Paris.

== Life and work ==
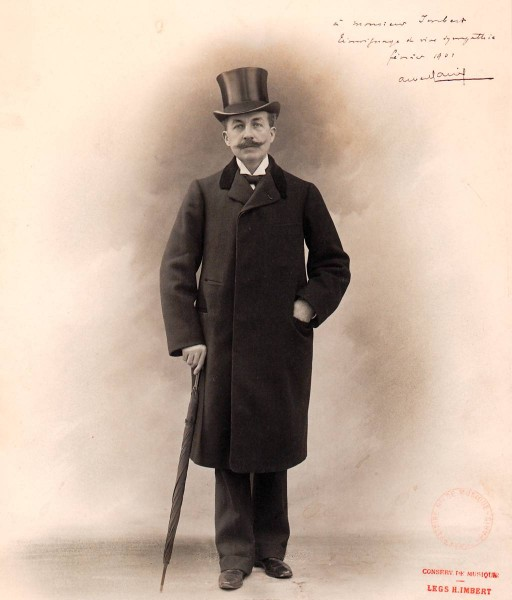
Albert Carré.

Leaving Alsace for Paris in 1870, Carré studied drama at the Paris Conservatoire, winning a 2nd prize in comedy, and was engaged at the Théâtre du Vaudeville, leading to a successful career as an actor, before becoming co-director of the Vaudeville in Paris and later the Théâtre-Libre and the Comédie-Française.

He left the Vaudeville to become director of the Opéra in Nancy, where he also helped institute a regular season of symphony concerts in the Salle Poirel from 1889.

Carré's main contribution to operatic history was made as director of the Opéra-Comique, a post he held from 1898 to 1914 and then again from 1919 to 1925 (co-director with Émile and Vincent Isola). He worked to raise the musical standards of the Opéra-Comique and was responsible for the premieres of major operas by French composers, commissioning Debussy's Pelléas et Mélisande, Gustave Charpentier's Louise and Dukas's Ariane et Barbe-bleue, and works by Reynaldo Hahn, Alfred Bruneau and Georges Hüe.

Carré was more progressive musically than his predecessor Carvalho, from whom he took over in 1898. He had written a report for government on the management of opera houses in Germany and approached his position at the Opéra-Comique with reforming zeal, introducing many modern practices. André Messager, (a lifelong friend and collaborator on his most important projects) became the 'directeur de la musique' with expanded responsibilities, allowing him an important role in deciding the works to be performed and singers to be hired. He instituted a more rigorous rehearsal schedule and absentee policy. Carré also created subscription series in which subscribers were guaranteed that works would not be repeated in the same season. In 1899 he inaugurated a 'family series', at a lower cost and concentrating on older works from the repertory. His contract stipulated that he keep in the repertory works of composers who had created the opéra-comique genre, and also that he could not foist the older repertory on secondary artists.

He produced the first French performances of several Italian operas, including Tosca (13 October 1903) and Madama Butterfly (28 December 1906), and mounted many other important new productions, including Carmen (8 December 1898). He was responsible for a new production of Le roi malgré lui in 1929 which helped to bring the piece back to the stage.

He wrote vaudevilles, comedies, and opéra-comique libretti, sometimes with Alexandre Bisson (1848–1912).

He retired in 1936 and wrote his memoirs.

Before and during the First World War, Carré also worked for the 'Deuxième Bureau'. This was part of the intelligence service of the French army and was involved in recruiting Alsatians to the French army when the region was still part of Germany.

He was named a Chevalier de la Legion d'honneur in 1892, an Officier in 1901, and a Commandeur in 1918.

== Works ==
- La Basoche, opéra-comique in 3 acts, music by André Messager, (Opéra-comique, 30 May 1890)
- Faust en ménage, fantaisie lyrique in one act, music by Claude Terrasse, (Théâtre de la Potinière, 5 January 1924)
- La montagne enchantée, pièce fantastique by Émile Moreau and Carré, music by André Messager and Xavier Leroux, 1897
- Frétillon, opéra-comique in 3 acts and 4 tableaux with songs by Béranger and book by Albert Carré. (Théâtre municipal de Strasbourg, 5 March 1927)
- Le roi bossu, opéra-comique in one act 17 March 1932. Music by Elsa Barraine
- Le Docteur Jo-Jo, adapted as Dr Bill, a three-act farce for the English stage by Hamilton Aide

=== Non-theatre works ===
- Les théâtres en Allemagne et en Autriche, 1889
- Les engagés volontaires alsaciens-lorrains pendant la guerre, Flammarion, 1923
- L'Opéra-Comique connu et inconnu, 1925
- Souvenirs de théâtre, Plon, 1950
- Les théâtres en Alsace-Lorraine, de leur rôle dans la propagation de la langue française en Alsace-Lorraine et dans le perfectionnement de sa prononciation.
