= I due derelitti =

I Due derelitti
- Directed by: Flavio Calzavara
- Cinematography: Aldo Tonti
- Music by: Cesare A. Bixio; Franco Casavola
- Release date: 14 November 1951
- Country: Italy
- Language: Italian

I Due derelitti is a 1951 Italian melodrama film directed by Flavio Calzavara.

== Plot ==
Count George of Kerlor, convinced that his wife has betrayed him and that little Gianni, the boy he raised as a son, is not in reality his own, entrusts the poor boy to a criminal nicknamed Snail, who already has a boy, Claudinet. Gianni is renamed Fanfan and, growing up with Claudinet, the two boys become inseparable.

== Cast ==
- Massimo Serato as Ramon
- Yves Deniaud as Lumaca
- Lea Padovani as Elena
- Marie Bizet as Lumaca's wife
- Enzo Cerusico
