= Théâtre Pigalle =

Theatre in Paris, 1929–1948

- Interactive map of Théâtre Pigalle
- Address: 10–12 rue Pigalle; 9th. Paris; Paris
- Coordinates: 48.8787°N 2.3328°E
- Owner: Henri de Rothschild
- Capacity: 1100

Construction
- Opened: 1929
- Closed: 1948

The Théâtre Pigalle (French pronunciation: [teɑtʁ piɡal]) was a theatre in Paris, located in the rue Pigalle in the ninth arrondissement.

== History ==
Opened on June 20, 1929, financed by Philippe de Rothschild on the estate of his father Henri de Rothschild, the Rothschilds' ambition was to construct the most modern theatre in the world. The architects, Charles Siclis, Henri Just and Pierre Blum, were sent through Europe to research the latest technical developments in theatre design. Graphic artist Jean Carlu designed two well-known posters emphasizing its machine-age image.

André Antoine was hired as art director, and Gabriel Astruc as manager. Antoine was replaced after two years with Gaston Baty following a disagreement with Rothschild.

The 1500-seat venue opened with Sacha Guitry's piece, Histories of France. The great German impresario Max Reinhardt staged a production of Die Fledermaus here in November 1933 Through the 1930s and the war, directors and performers here included Louis Jouvet (the 1931 premiere of Judith written by Jean Giraudoux), the brothers Émile Isola and Vincent Isola, Raymond Rouleau, and many others. Although the venue had been "furnished with four elevators, an immense switchboard, and a vast amount of complicated theatrical machinery", Jouvet, for one, found it challenging to make it work theatrically.

After the failure of Claude Vermorel's Thermidor in 1948, the theatre closed its doors. The site was sold in 1958, and an automobile garage built on the site.

== Sources ==
- photographs and documents (in French)
- online description with photographs
- version of this page from French Wikipedia accessed 9/22/2010
