= Tessa (play) =

1934 play by Jean Giraudoux

- Original language: French
- Written by: Jean Giraudoux
- Characters: Tessa Badamo
- Subject: Overcoming fears and hardtimes
- Genre: Drama
- Setting: 18th century, Scotland

Premiere
- Date: 14 November 1934
- Place: Théâtre de l'Athénée in Paris

Tessa (French title: Tessa, la nymphe au cœur fidèle) is a play written in 1934 by French dramatist Jean Giraudoux. It is a translation and adaptation of a 1926 stage version by Margaret Kennedy and Basil Dean of the former's 1924 novel The Constant Nymph.

== Original productions ==
Tessa was first performed on 14 November 1934 in Paris at the Théâtre de l'Athénée in a production by Louis Jouvet with music by Maurice Jaubert.
