= Sing Anyway =

1940 film

- Directed by: Pierre Caron
- Written by: Pierre Caron; Jean Nohain
- Produced by: Alphonse Bouriet
- Starring: Annie Vernay; Paul Cambo; Marie Bizet
- Cinematography: Willy Faktorovitch; Pierre Montazel
- Edited by: Madeleine Caplain
- Music by: Raoul Moretti
- Release date: 29 February 1940
- Running time: 75 minutes
- Country: France
- Language: French

Sing Anyway (French: Chantons quand même) is a 1940 French musical comedy film directed by Pierre Caron and starring Annie Vernay, Paul Cambo and Marie Bizet.

The film's art direction was by Jean Douarinou.

== Cast ==
- Guy Berry
- Marie Bizet as Mathilde
- Rivers Cadet
- Paul Cambo as Le sergent Jacques Destranges
- Raymond Cordy as Pimpant
- Eugène Frouhins
- Suzy Lay
- Noël Roquevert as Le vieux villageois
- Claude Roy as Le petit garçon
- Annie Vernay as Rosette
- Jack Wilson as Le Tommy

== Bibliography ==
- Crisp, Colin. Genre, Myth and Convention in the French Cinema, 1929-1939. Indiana University Press, 2002.
