= Marie Bizet =

French actress and singer

- Born: 26 April 1905; Paris, France
- Died: 10 July 1998 (aged 93); Couilly-Pont-aux-Dames, Seine-et-Marne, France
- Other name: Germaine Marie Madeleine Prévost
- Occupations: Actress, singer
- Years active: 1937–1989 (film)

Marie Bizet (1905–1998) was a French actress and singer.

== Selected filmography ==
- Lights of Paris (1938)
- Sing Anyway (1940)
- False Identity (1947)
- The Three Cousins (1947)
- I due derelitti (1951)

== Bibliography ==
- Jacob Paskins. Paris Under Construction: Building Sites and Urban Transformation in The 1960s. Routledge, 2015.
