= Vincent Isola =

French theatre director

Vincent Isola (24 July 1862 in Blida, Algeria – 31 August 1947 in Paris) was a French theatre director. Along with his older brother Émile Isola with whose life and career he was closely involved, he was a conjurer and theatre director in Paris; they were known as the Frères Isola – the Isola Brothers.

== Biography ==
Born in Algeria of Italian parents, Vincent Isola arrived in Paris in 1880, and with his brother undertook a variety of jobs before they first showed their conjuring act in public. They acquired the Théâtre des Capucines in 1892 and renamed it Théâtre Isola attracting large audiences.

At the end of 1895, the Isola brothers discovered the invention of the Frères Lumière, cinematography, and devised a projector called Isolatographe for which the films were provided by another pair of brothers, Frères Emile and Charles Pathé. By colouration of the films they were able to show ‘colour films’ at the Théâtre Isola.

In 1897, they bought the Parisiana and stopped their own act to become theatrical producers. The brothers became the directors of the Olympia in 1898, the Folies Bergère in 1901, and the Gaîté-Lyrique from 1903-1913. As joint directors of the Opéra-Comique from 1914-1925 (with Pierre-Barthélemy Gheusi and subsequently with Albert Carré), they revived Penelope by Fauré and Le Festin de l'araignée by Roussel, and produced Milhaud's first opera La brebis égarée.

Their tenure at the Théâtre Mogador saw the Paris premieres of No, No, Nanette and Rose-Marie, and revivals of Offenbach operettas.

Directorship of the Théâtre Sarah Bernhardt from 1926 brought about their ruin despite the success of the Ballets Russes of Serge Diaghilev, and of Sacha Guitry and Yvonne Printemps. In 1936 the brothers were obliged to restart touring with their conjuring act. During the occupation of Paris in 1943, they took over the direction of the Théâtre Pigalle. They died in relative obscurity after the war.

In 1917 the Bouffes-Parisiens presented L'Illusioniste, a play about the sentimental adventures of a magician, by Guitry inspired by the Isola brothers.

He received the Légion d'Honneur in 1924. He was married three times.
