= Combat avec l'ange =

1934 novel by Jean Giraudoux

Combat avec l'ange (Struggle with the Angel) is a novel by French playwright and novelist Jean Giraudoux and published by éditions Grasset in 1934.
