= Maurice Valency =

American dramatist

- Born: 22 March 1903; New York City, New York
- Died: 28 September 1996 (aged 93); New York City
- Education: City College of New York; Columbia Universityhttps://www.nytimes.com/1996/09/29/nyregion/maurice-valency-93-theatrical-master-dies.htmlmau
- Occupations: Playwright, Author, Critic
- Spouse: Janet Cornell
- Writing career
- Notable works: adaptations of The Visit, The Madwoman of Chaillot, Ondine, The Apollo of Bellac
- Notable awards: New York Drama Critics' Circle best foreign play (3 times); Tony Award nomination for Best Play in 1959

Maurice Valency (22 March 1903 – 28 September 1996) was a playwright, author, critic, and popular professor of Comparative Literature at Columbia University, best known for his award-winning adaptations of plays by Jean Giraudoux and Friedrich Dürrenmatt. He wrote several original plays, but is remembered primarily for his adaptations of the plays of others. Valency's version of The Madwoman of Chaillot would become the basis of the Jerry Herman musical Dear World on Broadway.

He is also noted for his book The Flower and the Castle: An Introduction to Modern Drama. John Gassner in his review of this book said that Mr. Valency brought to his work "a lifetime of study and experience as well as a viewpoint both Olympian and engaged." Valency also wrote television plays, adaptations of librettos, novels, and academic works on Chekhov, Strindberg, Ibsen and Shaw.

== Life ==
Maurice Valency was educated in New York City, receiving a Bachelor of Arts degree in 1923 at City College, and at Columbia University getting a Bachelor of Laws degree in 1927 (Valency was a member of the New York bar), and a Ph.D. in 1938. In 1936 he married the artist Janet Cornell; they remained married for 60 years until Valency's death in New York City at the age of 93.

Valency was a professor of comparative literature at Columbia and also taught dramatic literature at Juilliard and at Brooklyn College. He spoke seven languages.

== Awards ==
- New York Drama Critics Circle Award for best foreign play, 1949, for his adaptation of The Madwoman of Chaillot by Jean Giraudoux
- New York Drama Critics Circle Award for best foreign play, 1954, for his adaptation of Ondine by Jean Giraudoux
- New York Drama Critics Circle Award for best foreign play, 1959, for his adaptation of The Visit by Friedrich Dürrenmatt
- Tony Award nomination for Best Play, 1959, for his adaptation of The Visit
- Ford Foundation Fellowship, 1958
- Guggenheim Fellowship, 1960

== Works ==
=== Adaptations ===
- The Madwoman of Chaillot (Jean Giraudoux), Pub: Random House, New York, 1947, OCLC Num: 639892557
- The Enchanted: a comedy in three acts (Jean Giraudoux), Pub: Random House, New York, 1950, OCLC Num: 818215
- The Virtuous Island: a play in one act (Jean Giraudoux), Pub: Samuel French, New York, 1956, OCLC Num: 2070415
- The Queen's Gambit: a romantic comedy in three acts (Eugène Scribe), Pub: Samuel French, New York, 1956, OCLC Num:: 504510488
- Four plays: The Madwoman of Chaillot, The Apollo of Bellac, The Enchanted, Ondine, adapted, and with an introduction by Maurice Valency (Jean Giraudoux), Pub: Hill and Wang, New York, 1958, OCLC Num: 70459302
- The visit: a play in three acts (Friedrich Dürrenmatt), Pub: Random House, New York, 1958, OCLC Num: 1379852
- Feathertop, Pub: Dramatists Play Service, New York, 1998
- La Périchole (opera libretto), The American University Theatre, 1970, OCLC Num: 690595158
- The Reluctant King (opera libretto)

=== Original works ===
- The palace of pleasure: an anthology of the novella (with Henry Levtow), Pub: Capricorn Books, New York, 1960, OCLC Num: 296836
- In praise of love: an introduction to the love-poetry of the Renaissance, Pub: Macmillan, New York, 1958, OCLC Num: 313778
- The Thracian horses, Pub: Dramatists Play Service, New York, 1963, OCLC Num: 2684110
- The flower and the castle: an introduction to modern drama, Pub: Macmillan, New York, 1963, OCLC Num: 330053
- The breaking string: the plays of Chekhov, Pub: Oxford University Press, New York, 1966, OCLC Num: 712186
- The cart and the trumpet: the plays of George Bernard Shaw, Pub: Oxford University Press, New York, 1973, OCLC Num: 627998
- Savonarola (play), 1974
- Regarding Electra: a play in one or two acts, Pub: Dramatists Play Service, New York, 1976, OCLC Num: 2918272
- Conversation with a sphinx: a play in one act, Pub: Dramatists Play Service, New York, 1980, OCLC Num: 6925360
- The end of the world: an introduction to contemporary drama, Pub: Oxford University Press, New York, 1980, OCLC Num: 5051656
- Ashby: a novel, Pub: Schocken Books, New York, 1984, ISBN 0-8052-3907-3
- Julie: a novel, Pub: New Amsterdam, New York, 1989, ISBN 0-941533-44-1
- Tragedy, Pub: New York: New Amsterdam, 1991, ISBN 1-56131-009-3

=== Television plays ===
- 1951: Battleship Bismarck CBS-TV
- 1953: Toine (Omnibus), CBS-TV
- 1953: The Man without a Country (Omnibus), CBS-TV
- 1954: The Apollo of Bellac (Omnibus), CBS-TV
- 1955: She Stoops to Conquer (Omnibus), CBS-TV
- 1956: The Virtuous Island (for Omnibus), ABC-TV
- 1957: The Second Stranger (General Electric Theater), CBS-TV
- 1957: Feathertop (General Electric Theatre), CBS-TV (adaptation of story by Nathaniel Hawthorne)
