= Judith (Giraudoux) =

1931 play written by Jean Giraudoux

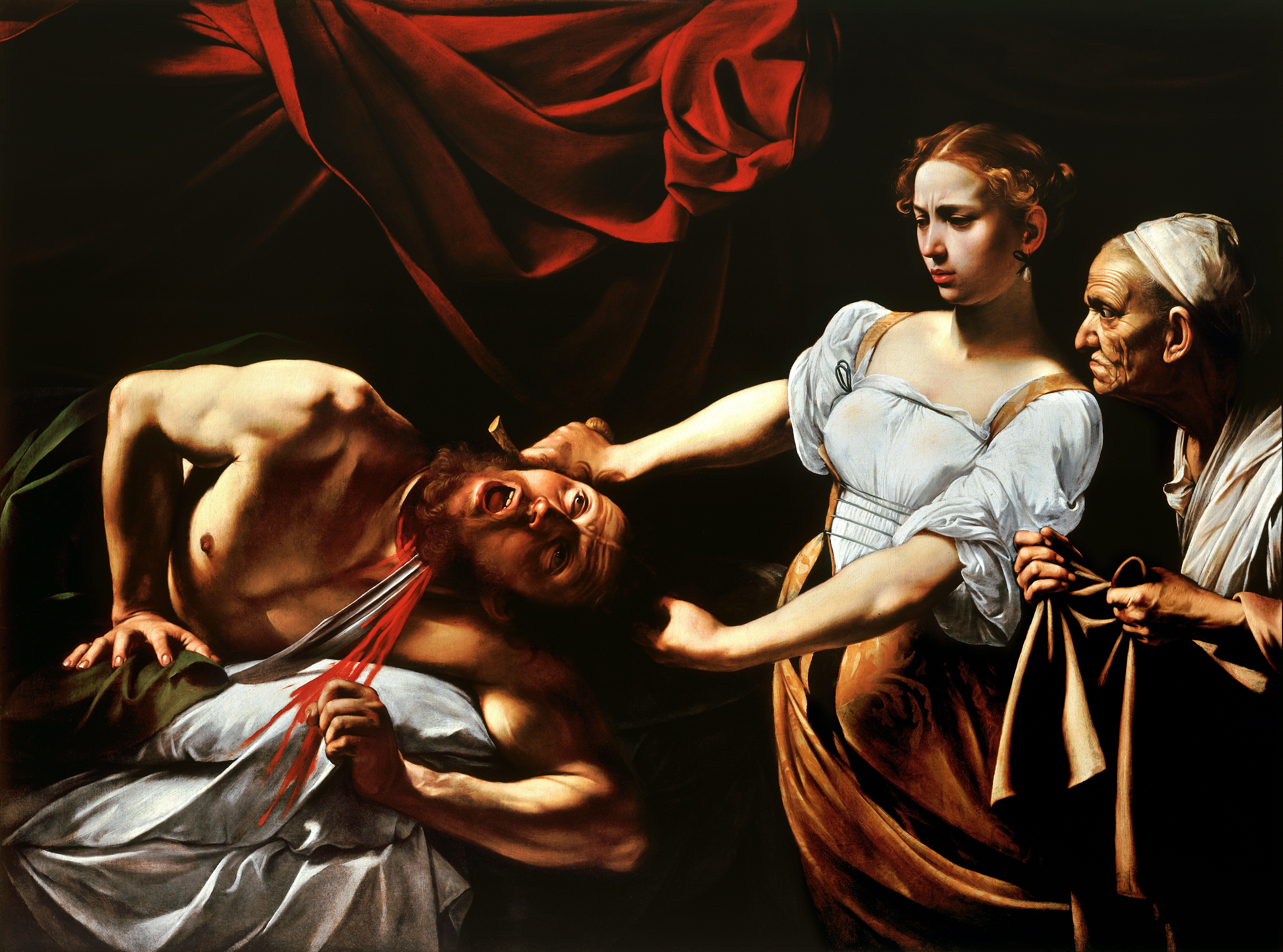
- Judith Beheading Holofernes by Caravaggio
- Written by: Jean Giraudoux
- Characters: Joseph, John, Prophet, Joachim, Paul, Judith, Susannah, Egon, Sara, Holofernes, Guard
- Original language: French
- Subject: Judith must seduce and kill invading general to save her city.
- Genre: Tragedy
- Setting: Ancient Judea

Premiere
- Date premiered: 4 November 1931
- Place premiered: Théâtre Pigalle in Paris

Judith is a play written in 1931 by French dramatist Jean Giraudoux. French composer Darius Milhaud wrote incidental music for the play.

== Synopsis ==
In ancient Palestine, an Assyrian army is attacking a community of Jewish people (Israelites). The Assyrians are led by Holofernes. The Jews see their own doom coming, and they believe that they can be saved only if the fairest and purest one of their women is sent to Holofernes to plead to spare them. They pick Judith, a 20-year-old virgin, who is beautiful, brilliant and wealthy.

Judith doesn’t want to go as she thinks the mission she’s being sent on is ridiculous and based on superstition. But confronted with the possibility that her country might be destroyed, she agrees to try it. However, a captain in the Israelite army named John wants to marry her, so he sends a prostitute, who will pretend to be Judith, to Holofernes. But Judith arrives at Holofernes’ tent first. One of Holofernes’ officers, Egon, a pederast, is persuaded by the prostitute to disguise himself as Holofernes. Judith is taken in by this trick, and feels humiliation and failure.

Holofernes finally arrives, but Judith is not able to make her plea to spare her fellow Israelites. Holofernes attempts to seduce Judith, and she agrees to go to his bed, then kills and beheads him there.

== Original productions ==
Judith was translated into English by John K. Savacool, in The Modern Theatre, ed. Eric Bentley, vol. 3 (1955), and by Christopher Fry, in The Drama of Jean Giraudoux, vol. 1 (1963).

Judith was first performed on 4 November 1931 in Paris at the Théâtre Pigalle in a production by Louis Jouvet.
