= Pleins pouvoirs =

Pleins pouvoirs ('Full powers') is a book written in 1939 by French author and diplomat Jean Giraudoux in which he discusses proposed reforms needed in France in the context of the nation's cultural heritage.

== Readings ==
- Giraudoux, Jean, Pleins Pouvoirs, French & European Pubns, January 11, 1999, ISBN 0-685-33923-8
- Pierre Vidal-Naquet, Les Juifs, la mémoire et le présent. Réflexions sur le génocide.
- Léon Poliakov : Histoire de l’antisémitisme, Calmann-Lévy, 1977, vol. 4, p. 334.
- R. Y. Dufour, Actualité du racisme de Jean Giraudoux, 1986, pp. 49-70
