= Marguerite Carré =

French operatic soprano

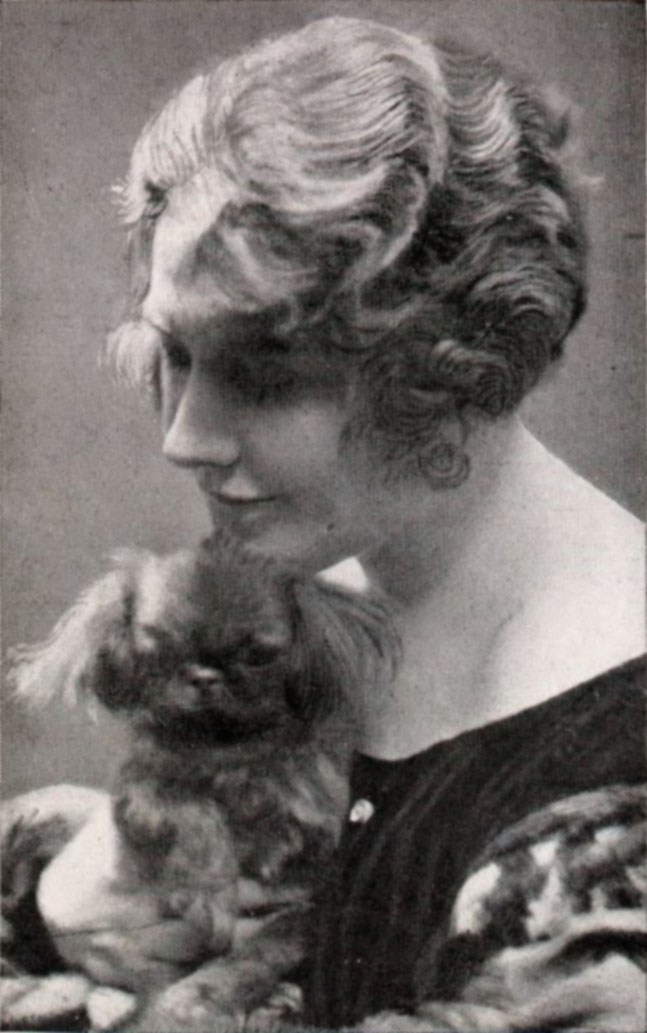
- Marguerite Carré c. 1918
- Born: Marguerite Giraud; 16 August 1880; Cabourg, France
- Died: 26 November 1947 (aged 67); Paris, France
- Burial place: Père Lachaise Cemetery
- Occupation: Soprano
- Spouse: Albert Carré
- Children: Jenny Carré

Marguerite Carré (née Giraud, also known as Marguerite Giraud-Carré) (16 August 1880 – 26 November 1947) was a French soprano who created numerous roles at the Paris Opéra-Comique in the course of her career.

She was born in Cabourg, France, the daughter of French baritone Auguste Louis Giraud and Jenny Gabrielle Vaillant of Paris (9 May 1857 – 1903). Auguste Giraud was the director of the Graslin Theater in Nantes where Carré made her stage debut in 1899 as Mimì in Puccini's La bohème. Descriptions of her performance were favorable. "She was very musical, gifted with a charming voice and intelligent actress."

She married Albert Carré, the director of the Opéra-Comique in 1902 and became known by her married name, Marguerite Carré. Their daughter Jenny Carré (1902–1945) would eventually take up a career in theater costume design. The couple divorced in 1924, but remarried in 1929.

In Paris, Carré was hailed as a "celebrated soprano" who created roles in 15 works at the Opéra-Comique. She was the first in Paris to perform Cio-Cio-San, the leading role in Puccini's Madama Butterfly. In addition, she earned acclaim for her work in the title role of Massenet's opera Manon and as Mélisande in Pelléas and Mélisande, the only opera by Debussy.

When American soprano Rosa Ponselle decided to add the role of Carmen to her repertoire, she studied with the Carré's for two months in 1935 before her Metropolitan Opera performance.

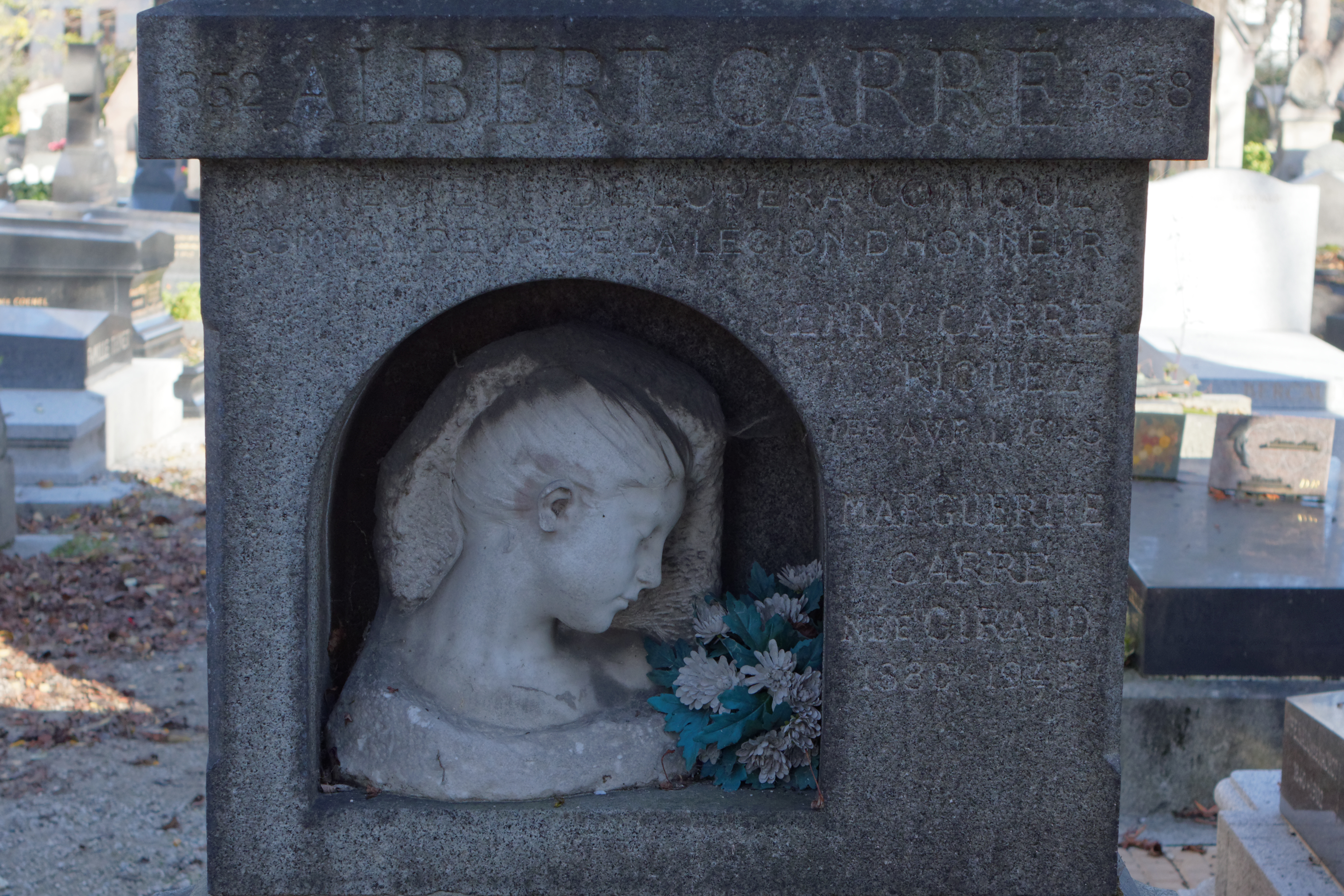
Tomb of Marguerite and Jenny Carré in Père Lachaise Cemetery..

Carré died in 1947 at the age of 67 in Paris and her tomb can be found at the Père Lachaise Cemetery in Paris (89th division).
