= L'Impromptu de Paris =

1937 play written by Jean Giraudoux

- Written by: Jean Giraudoux
- Original language: French
- Subject: A play about the theatre itself
- Genre: Drama
- Setting: A theatre stage

Premiere
- Date premiered: 3 December 1937
- Place premiered: Théâtre de l'Athénée in Paris

L'Impromptu de Paris (French pronunciation: [lɛ̃pʁɔ̃pty də paʁi], The Impromptu of Paris) is a play written in 1937 by French dramatist Jean Giraudoux.

== Original productions ==
L'Impromptu de Paris was first performed on 3 December 1937 in Paris at the Théâtre de l'Athénée in a production by Louis Jouvet.

L'Impromptu de Paris was translated into English by Rima Dell Reck, in the Tulane Drama Review (1959).
