= The Trojan War Will Not Take Place =

1935 play by Jean Giraudoux

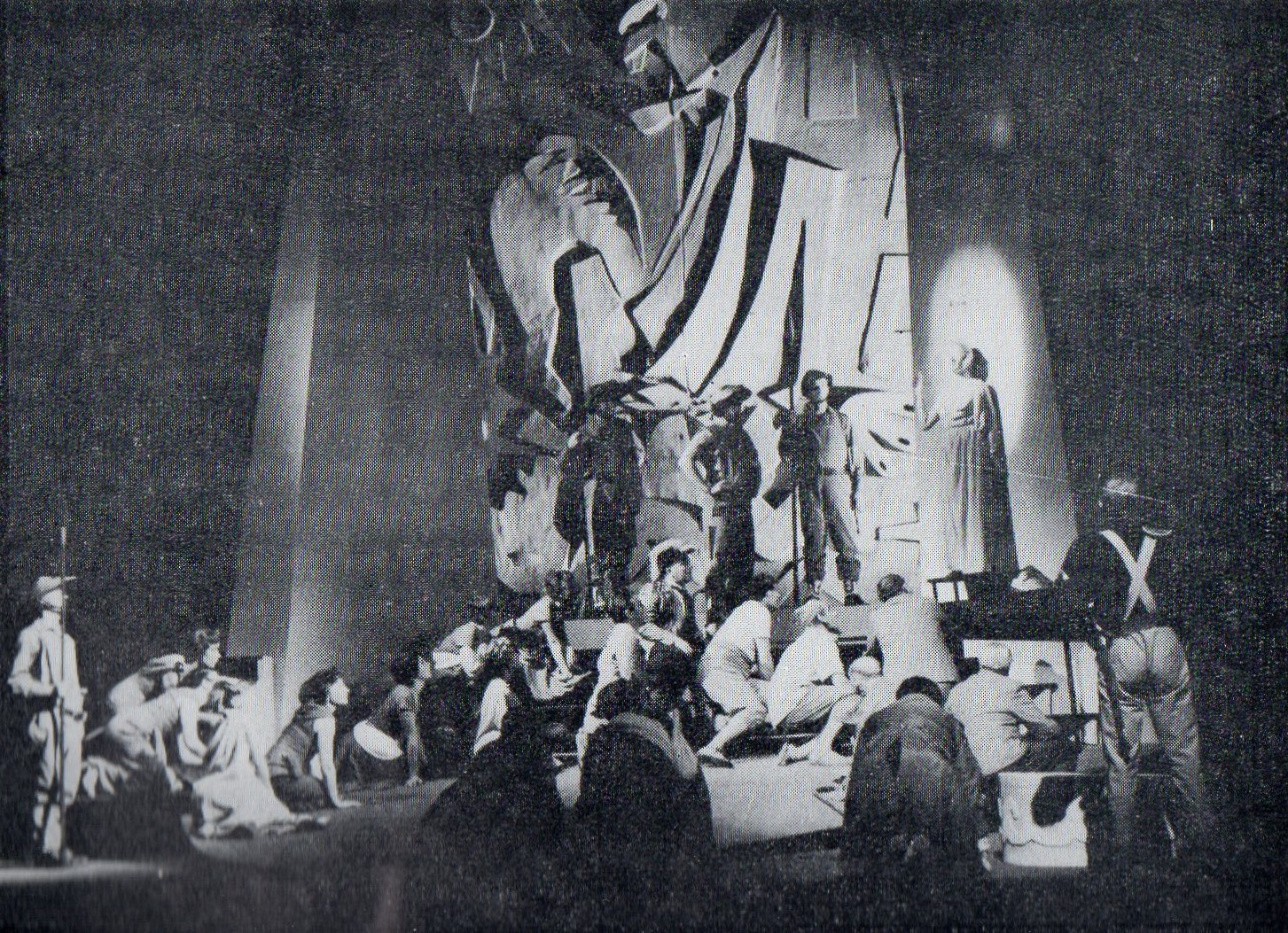
- Original language: French
- Written by: Jean Giraudoux
- Characters: Hector, Cassandra, Andromache, Priam, Polyxene, Demokos, Mathematician, Paris, Hecuba, Helen, Troilus, Ulysses
- Subject: Trojan War
- Genre: Tragedy
- Setting: Ancient Troy

Premiere
- Date: 21 November 1935
- Place: Théâtre de l'Athénée; Paris, France

The Trojan War Will Not Take Place (French: La guerre de Troie n'aura pas lieu, pronounced [la ɡɛʁ də tʁwa noʁa pa ljø]) is a play written in 1935 by French dramatist Jean Giraudoux. In 1955 it was translated into English by Christopher Fry with the title Tiger at the Gates. The play has two acts and follows the convention of the classical unities.

Within the framework of the Iliadic myth of the Trojan War, Giraudoux criticizes diplomacy and the behaviour of the national leaders and intellectuals who brought about World War I and the lead-up to World War II.

== Plot summary ==
The play takes place the day before the outbreak of the Trojan War inside the gates of the city of Troy. It follows the struggle of the disillusioned Trojan military commander Hector, supported by the women of Troy, as he tries to avoid war with the Greeks. Hector's wife Andromache is pregnant, and this reinforces his desire for peace. Along with his worldly-wise mother Hecuba, Hector leads the anti-war argument and tries to persuade his brother Paris to return Paris's beautiful but vapid captive Helen to Greece. Giraudoux presents Helen as not only an object of desire, but the epitome of destiny itself. She claims that she can see the future by seeing what is coloured in her mind, and she sees war. For Hector, Helen means only war and destruction. But for the other Trojan men, led by the poet Demokos, she represents an opportunity for glory; and they are eager to have others fight a war in her name. The peace agreement Hector negotiates with the visiting Greek commander Ulysses, is no match for Demokos' deliberate lies, and at the end of the play, the seer Cassandra's cynical prediction that war cannot be avoided has been proven right.

== Original productions ==
La guerre de Troie n'aura pas lieu was first performed on 21 November 1935 in Paris at the Théâtre de l'Athénée in a production by Louis Jouvet with Jouvet as Hector, and the role of Helen played by Madeleine Ozeray. The music was by Maurice Jaubert (op. 52).

An early adaptation was presented in English under the title No War with Troy, with Philip Merivale and Edith Atwater in May, 1939, at the Ann Arbor Theatre Festival.

The translation by Christopher Fry was first presented on 3 October 1955 in New York City by the Playwrights' Company with a British cast starring Michael Redgrave as Hector, Diane Cilento as Helen, Leueen MacGrath as Cassandra, and Barbara Jefford as Andromache.

In 1956 this production was nominated for the Tony Award for Best Play. Michael Redgrave was nominated for the Tony Award for Best Performance by a Leading Actor in a Play, and Diane Cilento (Helen) was nominated for Tony Award for Best Performance by a Featured Actress in a Play. It also won the New York Drama Critics Circle award for Best Foreign Play.

In 1957 David Sarvis directed The San Francisco Actor's Workshop production of Tiger at the Gates.

Tiger at the Gates became an episode of "Play of the Week" in the US, going out on February 8 (Season 1, Episode 18), and, unrelated, was later that same year also an "ITV Play of the Week" in Britain, adapted by William Bast and airing 25 October (Season 6, Episode 8).

Robert Redford appeared in Tiger at the Gates during the 1959 season of the Bucks County Playhouse, in New Hope, Pennsylvania. The principals were Hurd Hatfield and Frances Reid. Other players included Anne Diamond, Richard Durham, Renie Riano, Arthur Anderson, Richard Longman, Samuel Kressen, and Louise Fletcher. It ran from June 1 through 13, 1959 and was directed by Aaron Frankel. (SOURCE: Bucks County Playhouse Playbill, Michael Ellis)

La guerre de Troie n'aura pas lieu was translated into English as Tiger at the Gates by Christopher Fry, in The Drama of Jean Giraudoux, vol. 1 (1963).

A Broadway revival at the Vivian Beaumont Theater in 1968, starring Philip Bosco as Hector, ran for 44 performances.

== See also ==
- List of plays with anti-war themes
- The Gulf War Did Not Take Place, a collection of essays by Jean Baudrillard
