= Jean Giraudoux =

French novelist, essayist, diplomat and playwright (1882–1944)

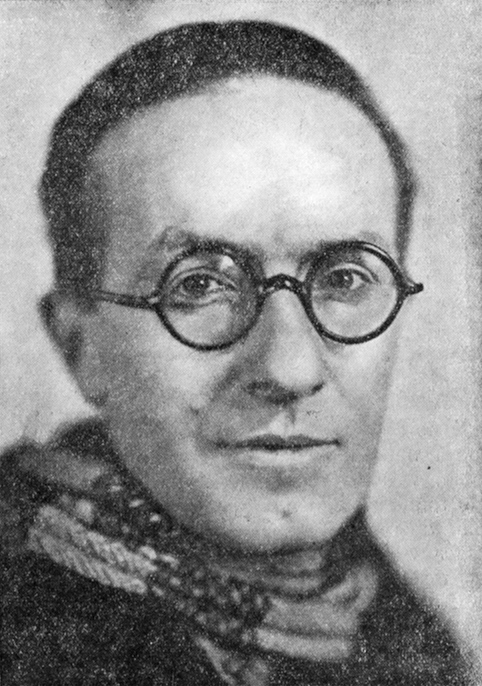
- Giraudoux in 1927
- Born: 29 October 1882; Bellac, Haute-Vienne, France
- Died: 31 January 1944 (aged 61); Paris, France
- Occupation: Dramatist
- Spouse: Suzanne Boland
- Children: 1 son
- Writing career
- Notable works: The Madwoman of Chaillot, Ondine, Duel of Angels, The Trojan War Will Not Take Place

Hippolyte Jean Giraudoux (/ʒɪroʊˈduː/; French: [ipɔlit ʒɑ̃ ʒiʁodu]; 29 October 1882 – 31 January 1944) was a French novelist, essayist, diplomat and playwright. He is considered among the most important French dramatists of the period between World War I and World War II.

His work is noted for its stylistic elegance and poetic fantasy. Giraudoux's dominant theme is the relationship between man and woman—or in some cases, between man and some unattainable ideal.

== Biography ==
Giraudoux was born 29 October 1882 in Bellac, Haute-Vienne, where his father, Léger Giraudoux, worked for the Ministry of Transport. Giraudoux studied at the Lycée Lakanal in Sceaux and upon graduation traveled extensively in Europe. After his return to France in 1910, he accepted a position with the Ministry of Foreign Affairs. With the outbreak of World War I, he served with distinction and in 1915 became the first writer ever to be awarded the wartime Legion of Honour.

He married in 1918 and in the subsequent inter-war period produced the majority of his writing. He first achieved literary success through his novels, notably Siegfried et le Limousin (1922) and Eglantine (1927). An ongoing collaboration with actor and theater director Louis Jouvet, beginning in 1928 with Jouvet's radical streamlining of Siegfried for the stage, stimulated his writing. But it is his plays that gained him international renown. He became well known in the English speaking world largely because of the award-winning adaptations of his plays by Christopher Fry (The Trojan War Will Not Take Place, as Tiger at the Gates) and Maurice Valency (the satirical The Madwoman of Chaillot, Ondine, The Enchanted, The Apollo of Bellac).

Giraudoux served as a juror with Florence Meyer Blumenthal in awarding the Prix Blumenthal, a grant given between 1919 and 1954 to painters, sculptors, decorators, engravers, writers, and musicians. In politics he was affiliated with the Radical Party, served in the cabinet of Édouard Herriot in 1932, and was appointed as Minister of Information by Édouard Daladier in 1939.

Giraudoux died mysteriously in Paris, 31 January 1944, at the age of 61. There has been speculation that he was poisoned. He is buried in the Cimetière de Passy in Paris.

Several of his poems were set to music by Maurice Jaubert.

== Works ==
=== Theatrical productions ===
- Siegfried (1928, premiere at the Comédie des Champs-Élysées)
- Amphitryon 38 (1929 premiere, Comédie des Champs-Élysées)
- Judith (1931, Théâtre Pigalle)
- The Enchanted (1933, Comédie des Champs-Élysées)
- Tessa (1934, Théâtre de l'Athénée)
- Supplément au voyage de Cook (1935, Théâtre de l'Athénée)
- The Trojan War Will Not Take Place (1935, Théâtre de l'Athénée)
- Electra (1937, Théâtre de l'Athénée)
- L'Impromptu de Paris (1937, Théâtre de l'Athénée)
- Song of Songs (1938, Comédie-Française)
- Ondine (1939, Théâtre de l'Athénée)
- The Apollo of Bellac (1942, Teatro Municipal (Rio de Janeiro))
- Sodom and Gomorrah (1943, Théâtre Hébertot)
- The Madwoman of Chaillot (1945, Théâtre de l'Athénée)
- Duel of Angels (Pour Lucrèce) (1953, Théâtre Marigny)
- Les Gracques (unfinished; published 1958)

=== Films ===
- The Duchess of Langeais (1942), adaptation and dialogue
- Angels of the Streets (1943), screenplay

=== Publications ===
- Provinciales (1909)
- L'École des indifférents (1911)
- Lectures pour une ombre (1917)
- Simon le Pathétique (1918)
- L'Adieu à la guerre (1919) Grasset
- Elpénor (1919)
- Amica America (1919)
- Adorable Clio (1920)
- Suzanne et le Pacifique (1921)
- Siegfried et le Limousin (1922)
- Juliette au pays des hommes (1924)
- Bella (1926)
- Églantine (1927)
- Aventures de Jérôme Bardini (1930)
- La France sentimentale (1932)
- Combat avec l'ange (1934)
- Choix des élues (1939)
- Pleins pouvoirs (1939)
- Armistice à Bordeaux (1945)
- Sans pouvoirs (1946)
- La Menteuse (1958)

=== English-language collections ===
- Giraudoux, Jean (1958), Four Plays, Adapted by Maurice Valency. New York: Hill and Wang, Inc. OCLC 807008 [Volume 1: Ondine, Enchanted, Madwoman of Challot, Apollo of Bellac]
- Giraudoux, Jean (1964), Three Plays, vol. 2, Translated by Phyllis La Farge and Peter H. Judd. New York: Hill and Wang. OCLC 751419 [Volume 2: Siegfried, Amphitryon 38, Electra]
- Giraudoux, Jean (1963), Three Plays, Translated by Christopher Fry. New York: Oxford University Press. OCLC 21419365 [Volume I: Tiger at the Gates; Duel of Angels; Judith]
- Giraudoux, Jean (1967), Plays, vol. 2, Translated by Roger Gellert. London: Oxford University Press. OCLC 656767230 [Amphitryon; Intermezzo; Ondine]
