= The Madwoman of Chaillot =

1945 play by Jean Giraudoux

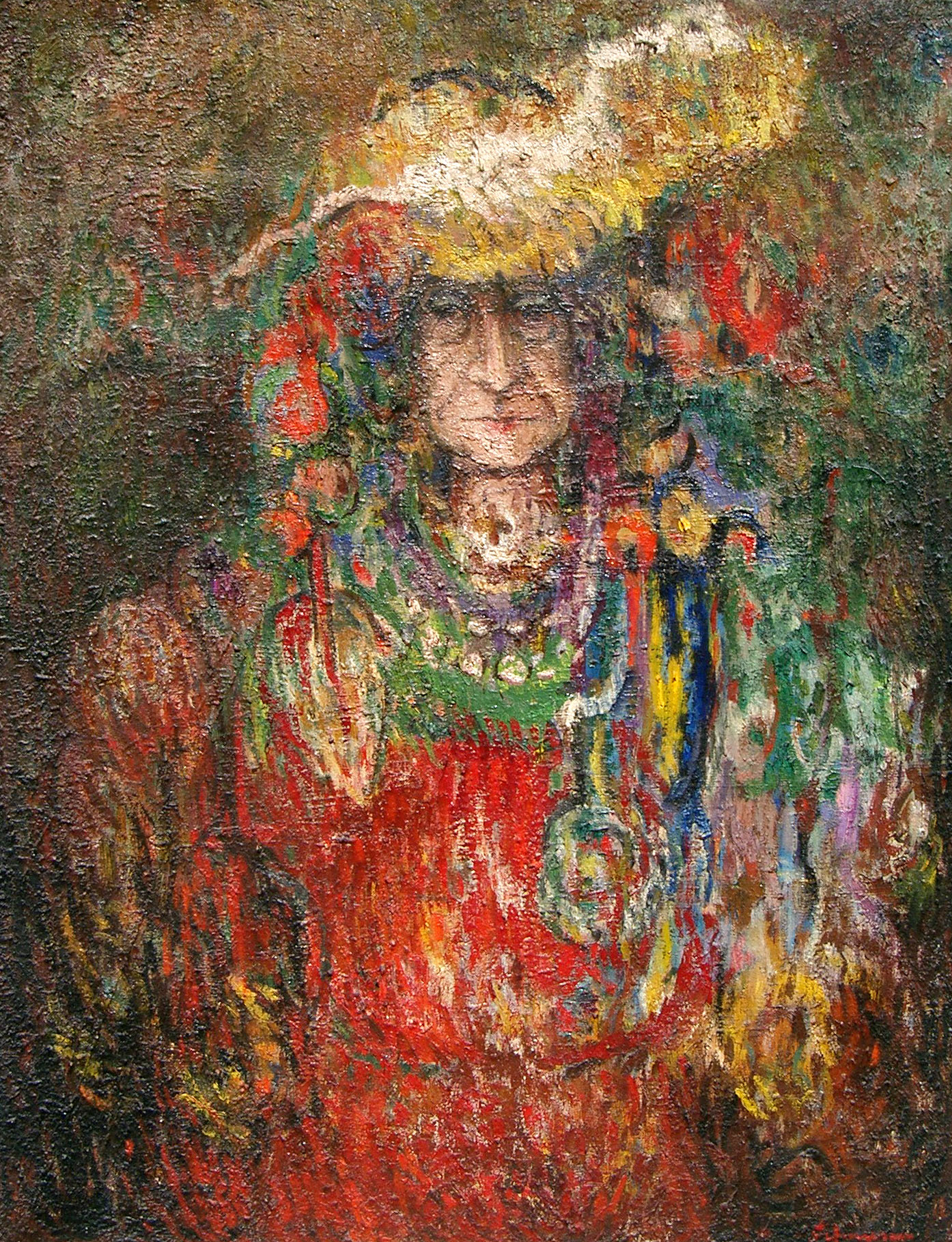
- Lucia Sturdza-Bulandra in The Madwoman of Chaillot by George Ștefănescu (1967)
- Original language: French
- Written by: Jean Giraudoux
- Characters: The Waiter, The Baron, Pierre, The President, The Prospector, The Street Singer, The Ragpicker, The Broker, Irma, Countess Aurelia, The Sergeant, The Sewer Man, Mme. Constance, Mme. Gabrielle, Mme. Josophine, The Presidents, The Prospectors, The Press Agents
- Subject: rights of the poor
- Genre: Comedy
- Setting: The Cafe de l'Alma in the fashionable Chaillot quarter of Paris

Premiere
- Date: 19 December 1945
- Place: Théâtre de l'Athénée; Paris

The Madwoman of Chaillot (French: La Folle de Chaillot, pronounced [la fɔl də ʃajo]) is a two-act play, a poetic satire, by French dramatist Jean Giraudoux, written in 1943 and first performed in 1945, after his death. The story concerns an eccentric Parisian woman and her struggles against the straitlaced authority figures in her life.

The original production was done with Giraudoux's frequent collaborator, actor and theater director Louis Jouvet, who played the Ragpicker. French actress Marguerite Moreno was the inspiration for the piece. The play has frequently been revived in France, with the title role played by Edwige Feuillère, Madeleine Robinson, or Judith Magre.

== Plot summary ==
The play is set in the café "chez Francis" in the Place de l'Alma in the Chaillot district of Paris. A group of corrupt corporate executives is meeting. They include the Prospector, the President, the Broker and the Baron, and they are planning to dig up Paris to get at the oil which they believe lies beneath its streets. Their nefarious plans come to the attention of Countess Aurelia, the benignly eccentric madwoman of the title. She is an aging idealist who sees the world as happy and beautiful. But, advised by her associate the Ragpicker, who is a bit more worldly than the Countess, she soon comes to realize that the world might well be ruined by these evil men who seek only wealth and power. These people have taken over Paris. "They run everything, they corrupt everything," says the Ragpicker. Already things have gotten so bad that the pigeons do not bother to fly any more. One of the businessmen says in all seriousness, "What would you rather have in your backyard: an almond tree or an oil well?"

Aurelia resolves to fight back and rescue humanity from the scheming and corrupt developers. She enlists the help of her fellow outcasts: the Street Singer, the Ragpicker, the Sewer Man, the Flower Girl, the Sergeant, and various other oddballs and dreamers. These include her fellow madwomen: the acidic Constance, the girlish Gabrielle, and the ethereal Josephine. In a tea party every bit as mad as a scene from Alice in Wonderland, they put the "wreckers of the world's joy" on trial, and in the end condemn them to banishment—or perhaps, death. One by one, the greedy businessmen are lured by the smell of oil to a bottomless pit from which they will (presumably) never return. Peace, love, and joy return to the world. Even the earthbound pigeons are flying again.

== Critiques ==
Theatre Arts magazine described the play as "one part fantasy, two parts reason." The New York Drama Critics' Circle hailed the 1948–50 production as "one of the most interesting and rewarding plays to have been written within the last twenty years", "pure gold, with no base metal" and having "an enveloping and irresistible humor."

== Original productions ==
La Folle de Chaillot was translated into English by Maurice Valency, and published in Jean Giraudoux, Four Plays, vol. 1 (1958).

- La Folle de Chaillot was first performed on 19 December 1945 in Paris at the Théâtre de l'Athénée in a production by Louis Jouvet, after Victory in Europe Day and the death of the playwright. It ran for 13 months in Paris, and the attendance was always completely full. The production's run ended when Marguerite Moreno, the lead actress, died.
- December 1948 – January 1950 production of The Madwoman of Chaillot, the English adaptation by Maurice Valency, at the Belasco and Bernard B. Jacobs theatres on Broadway. This featured Martita Hunt (playing the role of the Madwoman for over 350 performances and winning a 1949 Tony Award for her performance), and John Carradine as The Ragpicker. The play was selected as one of the best plays of 1948-1949, with an excerpted version published in "The Burns Mantle Best Plays of 1948-1949."
- 1961: production at the Crest Theatre in Toronto, Canada, directed by Leon Major, with Charmion King, Kate Reid, Barbara Hamilton, Barbara Chilcott, Gordon Pinsent and Bruno Gerussi.
- 1967: production at the Oxford Playhouse in Oxford, England, featuring Elisabeth Bergner and Hugh Paddick.
- 1969: Broadway musical adaptation of the Maurice Valency translation as Dear World, starring Angela Lansbury, music and lyrics by Jerry Herman, book by Jerome Lawrence and Robert E. Lee. This won a Tony for Lansbury.
- 1975: The Madwoman of Chaillot, the English adaptation by Maurice Valency at The College of Santa Fe Greer Garson Theatre, starring Greer Garson.
- 1985: production of The Madwoman of Chaillot, from the Mirror Repertory Theatre Company at the York Theatre at Saint Peter's Lutheran Church, in the Citigroup Center, starring Geraldine Page.
- 1992: dance performance starring Maya Plisetskaya, choreography by Gigi Caciuleanu, music by Rodion Shchedrin; Paris, Espace Cardin.
- 2016: re-adaptation and new English translation performed by Experimental Theatre Wing at NYU, directed by Cecil Mackinnon with original music by Johnathan Hart-Makwaia, performed at the Abe Burrows Theatre.
- 2017: a new English translation by David Edney, commissioned by and performed at the Stratford Festival, Ontario, Canada. Directed by Donna Feore, starring Seana McKenna as Aurelia and Scott Wentworth as the Rag Picker.

== Film version ==
In 1969, The Madwoman of Chaillot starring Katharine Hepburn was produced based on Maurice Valency's translation of the play.
