= Paul Cambo =

French actor (1908–1978)

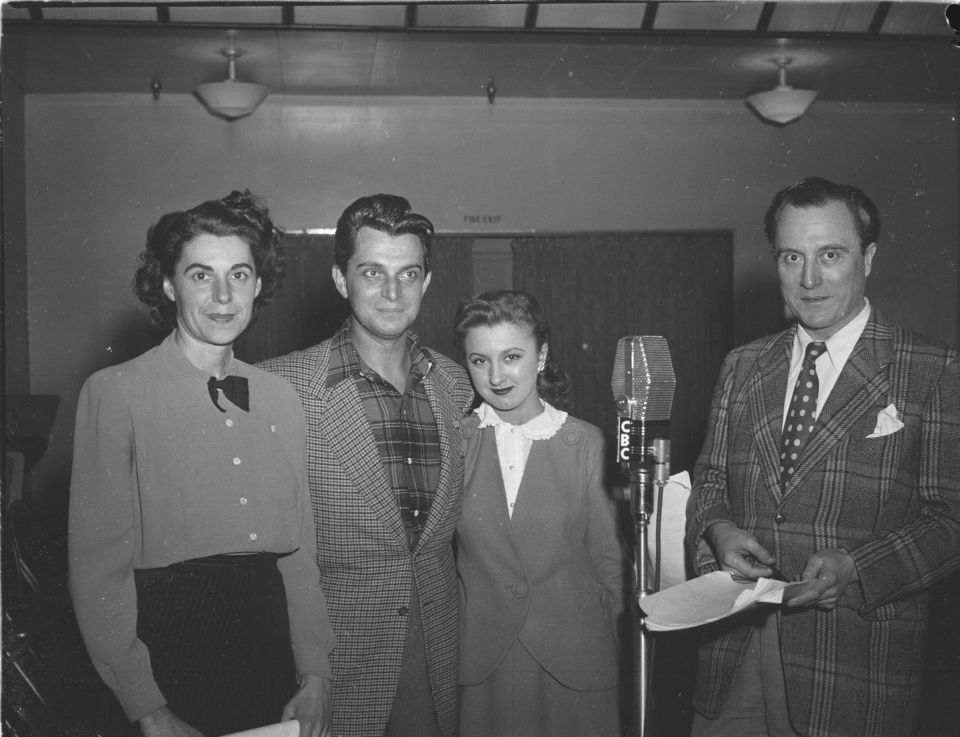
- Cambo (2nd from left) in 1946.
- Born: 3 July 1908; Bort-les-Orgues, Corrèze, France
- Died: 19 February 1978 (aged 69); Maisons-Laffitte, France
- Occupation: Actor
- Years active: 1932-1975

Paul Cambo (1908–1978) was a French stage and film actor.

== Selected filmography ==
- Ramuntcho (1938)
- My Priest Among the Rich (1938)
- Heroes of the Marne (1938)
- The Gutter (1938)
- The Chess Player (1938)
- Sing Anyway (1940)
- The Village of Wrath (1947)
- Your Turn, Callaghan (1955)
- Napoleon II, the Eagle (1961)
- La Course à l'échalote (1975)

== Bibliography ==
- Goble, Alan. The Complete Index to Literary Sources in Film. Walter de Gruyter, 1999.
