= Siegfried et le Limousin =

1922 novel by Jean Giraudoux

Siegfried et le Limousin is a novel by Jean Giraudoux published in 1922 by Grasset. This novel is famous for having brought success to its author. In the story, Giraudoux explores the hostility between two warring countries, France and Germany, which underlies the tale of a man who has lost his memory. Giraudoux went on to adapt the story as the successful drama Siegfried in 1928.

== Summary ==
The novel begins in January 1922. The narrator suspects, through stylistic hints in a German newspaper, that a famous German jurist, Siegfried von Kleist, might be one of his friends–a French soldier and writer, Jacques Forestier. However, Forestier had been reported missing during the Great War–the First World War. A wound suffered in that war indeed caused Forestier to become an amnesiac, who then continued his life in Germany under a completely different name, unaware of his former identity. The narrator goes to Munich, where he hopes to identify Forestier with the help of Baron von Zelten, a German diplomat serving in Paris. In the course of being reunited with his former lover, Geneviève, he recovers his memory. In the end, Siegfried returns to Limousin, his former home in France, to resume his old life.
