= The Spider's Feast =

1912 ballet-pantomime

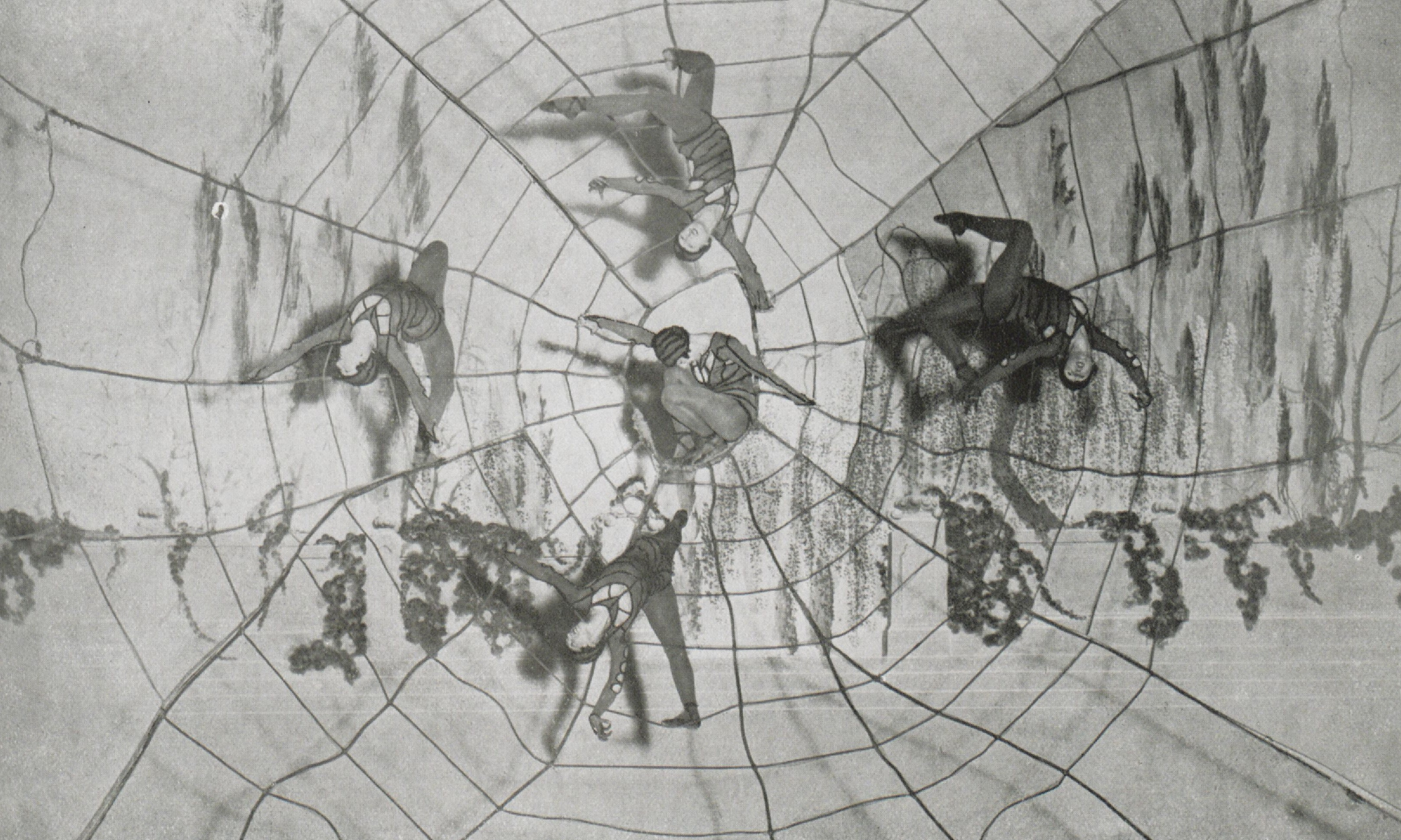
Mado Minty in The Spider's Feast, 1927.

The Spider's Feast (Le Festin de l'araignée), Op. 17, is a 1912 "ballet-pantomime" with music by the French composer Albert Roussel (1869–1937) to a scenario by Gilbert de Voisins.

== The ballet ==
The ballet depicts insect life in a garden, evoked by the flute solo at the opening and close of the work, and where insects are trapped in the spider's web, but when the spider prepares to begin its feast, it in turn is killed by a praying mantis. The funeral procession of the mayfly concludes the work. The full ballet lasts approximately half an hour.

Part One

- Prélude
- Entrée des fourmis
- Entrée des Bousiers
- Danse du Papillon
- Danse de l'araignée
- Ronde des fourmis
- Combat des mantes
- Danse de l'araignée
- Eclosion et danse de l'Éphémère

Part Two

- Danse de l'Éphémère et des vers de fruit
- Mort de l'Éphémère
- Agonie de l'araignée
- Funérailles de Éphémère

Outside of theatrical performances, an orchestral suite has been performed in concert and recorded:

- Prélude
- Entrée des fourmis
- Danse du Papillon
- Eclosion et danse de l'Éphémère
- Funérailles de Éphémère
- La nuit tombe sur le jardin solitaire

== Performance history ==
The work was premiered at the Théâtre des Arts in Paris on 3 April 1913 with Mlle Sahary-Djali in the title role, choreography by Léo Staats and design by Maxime Dethomas. It was revived at the Opéra-Comique on 5 December 1922 with Mado Minty as the spider and entered the repertoire of the Paris Opéra on 1 May 1939 with Suzanne Lorcia.

Typical of Roussel's earlier works, the music is impressionistic, much in the style of his countrymen Claude Debussy and Maurice Ravel. It is lushly orchestrated. Composed to order in only two months, the music was highly regarded for its "inventive counterpoints, bounding scherzos, gay and uneven rhythms, and personal instrumentation, both caressing and vigorous".

The symphonic fragments from the full score were first recorded in 1928 with the composer conducting (his only recording). Walter Straram and his Orchestre des Concerts Straram made a recording for Columbia in March 1930. Arturo Toscanini and the NBC Symphony Orchestra performed this orchestral suite during a broadcast concert in NBC Studio 8-H on 7 April 1946. Charles Munch and the London Philharmonic Orchestra in June 1947 recorded the work for Decca and Louis Fourestier conducting the Orchestre du Théâtre national de l'Opéra recorded it for Pathé in October 1948. In 1952, Rene Leibowitz recorded the suite with the Paris Philharmonic Orchestra and in 1953 the Detroit Symphony Orchestra under Paul Paray recorded it for Mercury. Ernest Ansermet and the Suisse Romande Orchestra made the first complete recording of the ballet in 1954. Georges Prêtre recorded this same music with the Orchestre National de France for EMI in 1984. A recording by Christoph Eschenbach and the Orchestre de Paris was released on Ondine in 2008.

== Instrumentation ==
The scoring includes 2 flutes (one doubling piccolo), 2 oboes (one doubling cor anglais), 2 clarinets in A, 2 bassoons; 2 horns in F (chromatiques), 2 trumpets in C; timpani, one percussion (cymbal, triangle, tambourine); celeste, harps; strings.
