= Théâtre de l'Athénée =

Theatre in Paris, France

Théâtre de l'Athénée Louis-Jouvet
- Comédie-Parisienne (1894); Athénée-Comique (1896); Comédie-Parisienne (1898); Théâtre de l'Athénée (1899); Athénée Théâtre Louis-Jouvet (1934)
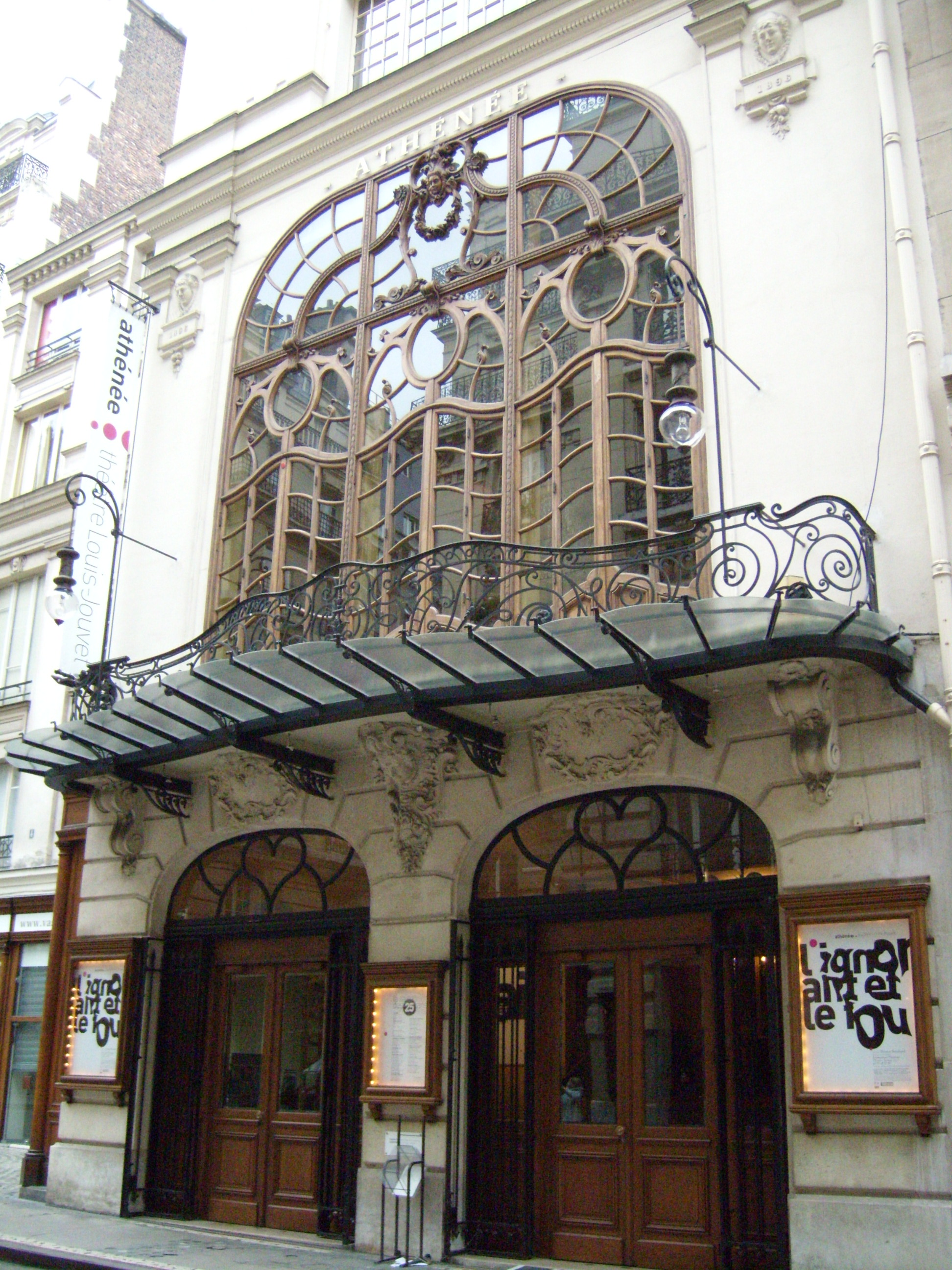
- Exterior of the Théâtre de l'Athénée
- Interactive map of Théâtre de l'Athénée; Louis-Jouvet
- Address: 7 rue Boudreau; square de l'Opera-Louis-Jouvet; 9th arrondissement of Paris
- Coordinates: 48.87191°N 2.329°E
- Capacity: main theatre: 570; small theatre: 91

Construction
- Opened: 31 December 1894
- Architects: Stanislas Loison (1893); further modifications by; Paul Fouquiau (1894)

Website
- www.athenee-theatre.com

The Théâtre de l'Athénée (French pronunciation: [teɑtʁ də latene]) is a theatre at 7 rue Boudreau, in the 9th arrondissement of Paris. Renovated in 1996 and classified a historical monument, the Athénée inherits an artistic tradition marked by the figure of Louis Jouvet who directed the theatre from 1934 to 1951. During the period when he was director, it became known as the Athénée Théâtre Louis-Jouvet.

== History ==
The current Théâtre de l'Athénée was constructed from a foyer (part of the former Éden-Théâtre), which was converted into an intimate theatre in 1893 by the architect Stanislas Loison with further modifications carried out by the architect Paul Fouquiau in 1894. It opened on 31 December 1894 under the name Théâtre de la Comédie-Parisienne.

Oscar Wilde's play Salomé (originally written in French) was premiered there on 11 February 1896 in a staging by Lugné-Poe's theatre group, the Théâtre de l'Œuvre. The location had become rather unsafe, as demolition work on the Éden-Théâtre was in progress all around it. The police considered banning the performances due to the risk of fire or accident. Their concerns were somewhat reduced by the construction of a temporary 12-meter-long passageway from the theatre to the rue Boudreau.

Later that year the construction work on the site of the former Éden theatre was finally completed by Fouquiau, and the theatre was reconstituted as the Athénée-Comique, "from the name of a notoriously frivolous, perhaps immoral, establishment nearby that had to close ten years earlier" [see Théâtre de l'Athénée (rue Scribe)]. The theatre was renamed Athénée in 1899. For the first 40 years it was the home of vaudevilles, comedies, and melodramas.

In 1934 Louis Jouvet took control of the theatre and made it famous. He continued to produce and perform there (not exclusively, however), until his death in 1951. Among the premieres under Jouvet were several plays by Jean Giraudoux, including Tessa (14 November 1934), La guerre de Troie n'aura pas lieu (The Trojan War Will Not Take Place; 21 November 1935), Supplément au voyage de Cook (The Virtuous Island; 21 November 1935), Electre (13 May 1937), L'impromptu de Paris (3 December 1937), Ondine (3 May 1939), and La folle de Chaillot (The Madwoman of Chaillot; 22 December 1945), as well as Marcel Achard's Le corsaire (25 March 1938) and Jean Genet's Les bonnes (The Maids; 19 April 1947). One of Jouvet's most successful revivals was Molière's L'école des femmes (The School for Wives; 9 May 1936; 446 performances, plus another 229 on tour), in which Jouvet performed the role of Arnolphe.

Pierre Renoir, who had been an actor in Jouvet's troupe, was artistic director, briefly, from 1951 until his death the following year.

In the 2000s the Théâtre Athénée presented revivals of operetta and musical comedy, among which the Brigands company produced Le docteur Ox (2003), Ta Bouche (2004), Toi c'est moi (2005) and Arsène Lupin Banquier (2007).

== Sources ==
- Bristow, Joseph (2009). Oscar Wilde and Modern Culture: The Making of a Legend. Athens, Ohio: Ohio University Press. ISBN 978-0-8214-1837-6.
- Garreau, Joseph E. (1984a). "Genet, Jean" in Hochman 1984, vol. 2, pp. 250–254.
- Garreau, Joseph E. (1984b). "Giraudoux, Jean" in Hochman 1984, vol. 2, pp. 316–324.
- Hartnoll, Phyllis, editor (1983). The Oxford Companion to the Theatre (fourth edition). Oxford: Oxford University Press. ISBN 978-0-19-211546-1.
- Hochman, Stanley, editor (1984). McGraw-Hill Encyclopedia of World Drama (second edition, 5 volumes). New York: McGraw-Hill. ISBN 978-0-07-079169-5.
- Lecomte, Louis-Henry (1905). Histoire des théâtres 1402–1904. Notice préliminaire. Paris: Daragon. View at Google Books.
- Liebowitz Knapp, Bettina (1957). Louis Jouvet: Man of the Theatre. New York: Columbia University Press. ISBN 9781199441348.
- Sadie, Stanley, editor (1992). The New Grove Dictionary of Opera (4 volumes). London: Macmillan. ISBN 978-1-56159-228-9.
- Tydeman, William; Price, Steven (1996). Wilde: Salome Cambridge: Cambridge University Press. ISBN 978-0-521-56545-5.
