= Louis Jouvet =

French actor (1887–1951)

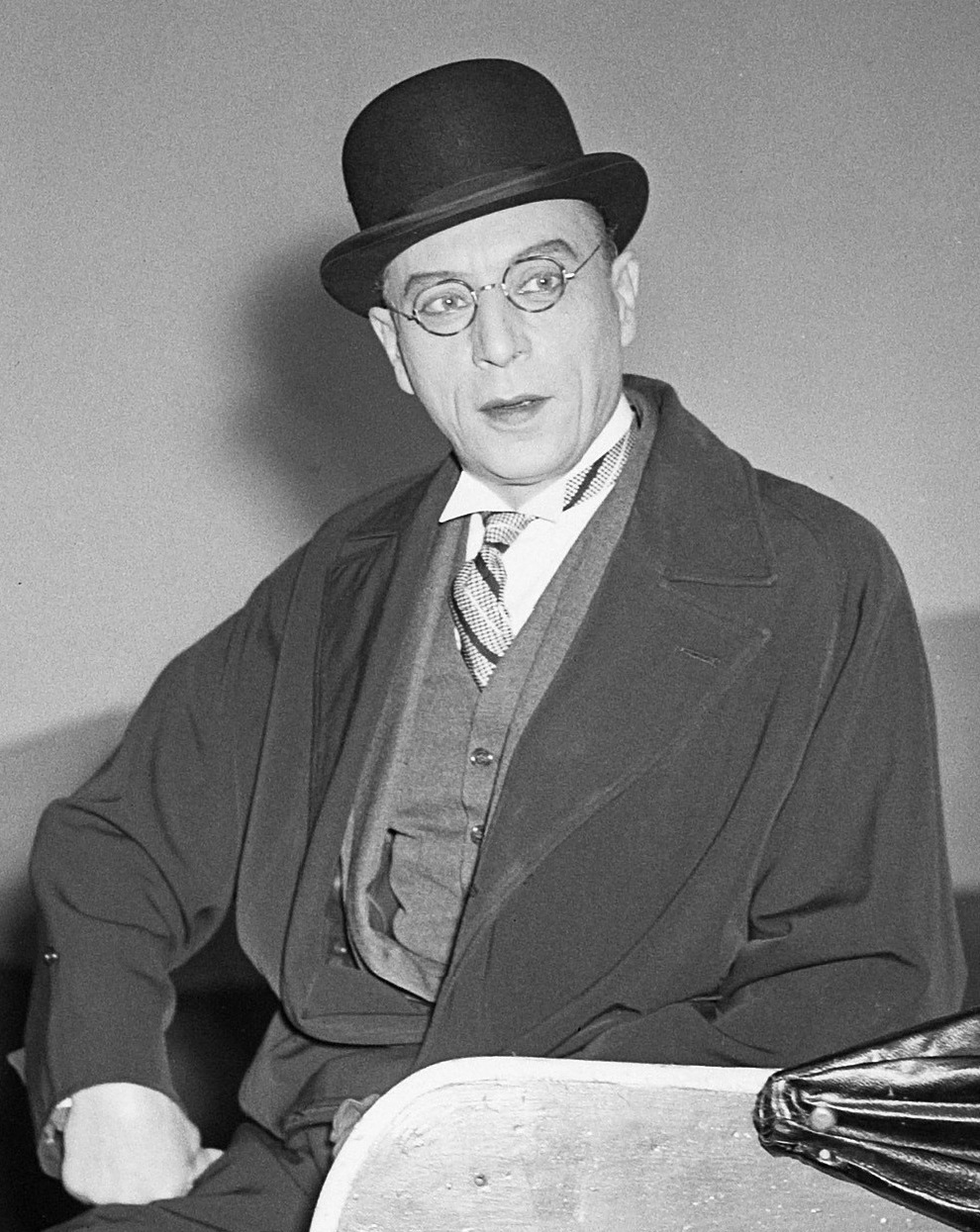
- Louis Jouvet in the 1950 production of The School for Wives
- Born: Jules Eugène Louis Jouvet; 24 December 1887; Crozon, France
- Died: 16 August 1951 (aged 63); Paris, France
- Occupations: Actor, director, theatre manager
- Spouse: Else Collin (1886–1967)
- Partner: Madeleine Ozeray (?–1943)

Jules Eugène Louis Jouvet (French pronunciation: [ʒyl øʒɛn lwi ʒuvɛ]; 24 December 1887 – 16 August 1951) was a French actor, theatre director and filmmaker.

== Life and career ==
=== Early years ===
Jouvet was born in Crozon. He had a stutter as a young man and originally trained as a pharmacist. He received an advanced degree in pharmacy in 1913, though he never actually practiced, instead pursuing a career in theatre.^{:91}

=== Career ===
Jouvet was 'refused three times by the Conservatoire' in Paris before being accepted to Jacques Copeau's Théâtre du Vieux-Colombier as a stage manager in 1913.^{:345} Copeau's training included a varied and demanding schedule, regular exercise for agility and stamina, and pressing his cast and crew to invent theatrical effects in a bare-bones space. It was there Jouvet developed his considerable stagecraft skills, particularly makeup and lighting (he developed a kind of accent light named the jouvet). These years included a successful tour to the United States.

While influential, Copeau's theater was never lucrative and Jouvet left in October 1922 for the Comédie des Champs-Élysées (the small stage of the Théâtre des Champs-Élysées). He was made director of the theatre in 1924. In December 1923 he staged his single most successful production, the satire Doctor Knock, written by Jules Romains.^{:92} His characterization of the manipulative crank doctor was informed by his own experience in pharmacy school. It became his signature and his standby; he produced it 'almost every year until the end of his life'. Jouvet remained at the Comédie until 1934, when he moved to the Théâtre de l'Athénée due to the high overhead of running a theatre troupe at the Comédie.^{:92} He served as director of the Théâtre from 1934 through his death in 1951.^{:92}

In 1927, he formed Le Cartel des Quatre [The Cartel of Four] with Charles Dullin, Gaston Baty (1885–1952), and Georges Pitoëff.^{:80} The Cartel was 'an artistic and economic alliance in opposition to academic and commercial theatre',^{:178} and the directors did not share a specific 'aesthetic movement'.^{:80}

In 1928 he began an ongoing collaboration with playwright Jean Giraudoux, beginning with a radical streamlining of Giraudoux's Siegfried et le Limousin (1922). Their work together included the first staging of The Madwoman of Chaillot in 1945.

Jouvet starred in some 34 films, including two recordings of Dr. Knock, once in 1933 and again in 1951. He was professor at the French National Academy of Dramatic Arts.

=== Death ===
He died 16 August 1951 in his dressing room at the Théâtre de l'Athénée after having a heart attack. Jouvet is buried in the Montmartre Cemetery in Paris. The Athénée theatre now bears his name.^{:92}

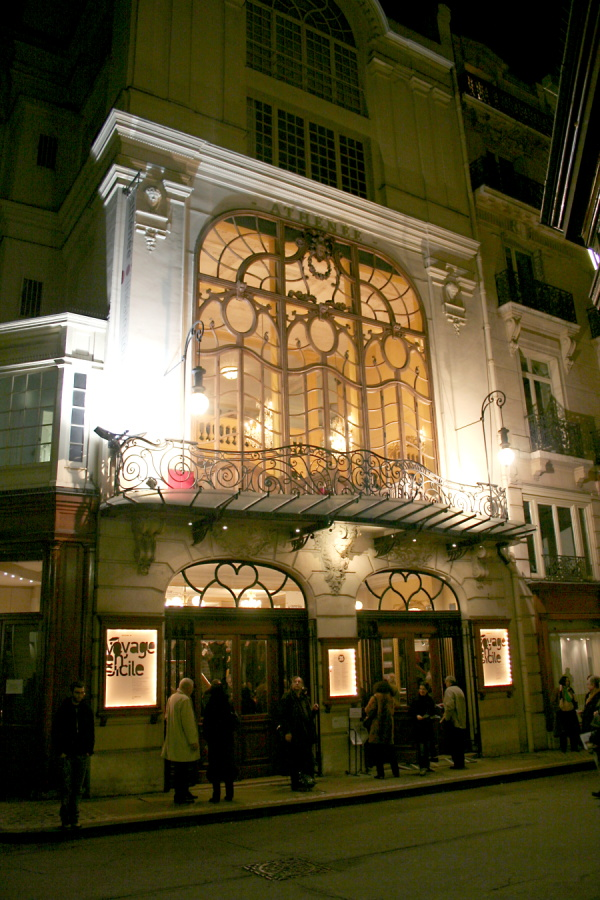
Théâtre de l'Athénée Louis-Jouvet, Paris, named for Jouvet

== Relatives ==
French-Argentine actor Maurice Jouvet (1923–1999) was his nephew.

British actor Peter Wyngarde has claimed Jouvet as his maternal uncle, but Jouvet's immediate family tree does not confirm this.

== Legacy ==
Pixar paid homage to Jouvet by basing the appearance of the character Anton Ego in Ratatouille (2007) on him.

== Honors and awards ==
Commander of the Order of Legion of Honour

== Works ==
=== Theatre ===
- 1931: original production of Judith, written by Jean Giraudoux, at the Théâtre Pigalle
- 1935: original production of The Trojan War Will Not Take Place, written by Jean Giraudoux, starring Jouvet as Hector, also starring Madeleine Ozeray, at the Athénée in Paris
- 1947: directed the première of Jean Genet's The Maids at the Athénée in Paris on 17 April.
- 1951: directed the première of Jean-Paul Sartre's The Devil and the Good Lord at the Théâtre-Antoine in Paris on 7 June.

=== Partial filmography ===
- Topaze (1933) – Albert Topaze
- Knock (1933) – Dr. Knock
- La Kermesse Heroique (1935) – Le chapelain / The Priest
- Compliments of Mister Flow (1936) – Achille Durin / Mr. Flow
- Les Bas Fonds (1936) – Le baron
- Street of Shadows (1937) – Le commandant Simonis
- Life Dances On (1937) – Pierre Verdier, dit Jo
- Drole de Drame (1937) – Archibald Soper
- The Cheat (1937) – Valfar
- The Alibi (1937) – Le commissaire Calas
- La Marseillaise (1938) – Roederer, le procureur du département
- Ramuntcho (1938) – Itchoua
- Sirocco (1938) – Rossignol
- The Shanghai Drama (1938) – L'aventurier Ivan
- The Curtain Rises (1938) – Le professeur Lambertin
- Education of a Prince (1938) – René Cercleux
- Hôtel du Nord (1938) – Monsieur Edmond
- La Fin du jour (1939) – Raphaël Saint Clair
- The Phantom Carriage (1939) – Georges
- Serenade (1940) – Le baron Hartmann
- L'école des femmes (1940)
- Volpone (1941) – Mosca
- Immortal France (1943) – Pierre Froment / Félix Froment
- Un revenant (1946) – Jean-Jacques Sauvage
- Carbon Copy (1947) – Manuel Ismora – un cambrioleur de grande envergure / Gabriel Dupon – son sosie, un brave homme / Le duc de Niolles / Le déménageur / Le Norvégien
- Quai des Orfèvres (1947) – L'inspecteur adjoint Antoine
- Monelle (1948) – Gérard Favier
- Between Eleven and Midnight (1949) – L'inspecteur Carrel
- Return to Life (1949) – Jean Girard (segment 3 : "Le retour de Jean")
- Miquette (1950) – Monchablon
- Lady Paname (1950) – Gambier, dit Bagnolet – un photographe anarchiste
- Dr. Knock (1951) – Docteur Knock
- Young Love (1951) – L'inspecteur Ernest Plonche
