= La Villa Santo-Sospir =

La Villa Santo Sospir
- Directed by: Jean Cocteau
- Written by: Jean Cocteau
- Starring: Jean Cocteau; Édouard Dermit; Francine Weisweiller
- Cinematography: Vladimir Ivanov
- Music by: Jean-Sébastien Bach; Antonio Vivaldi
- Release date: 1952
- Running time: 35 minutes
- Country: France
- Language: French

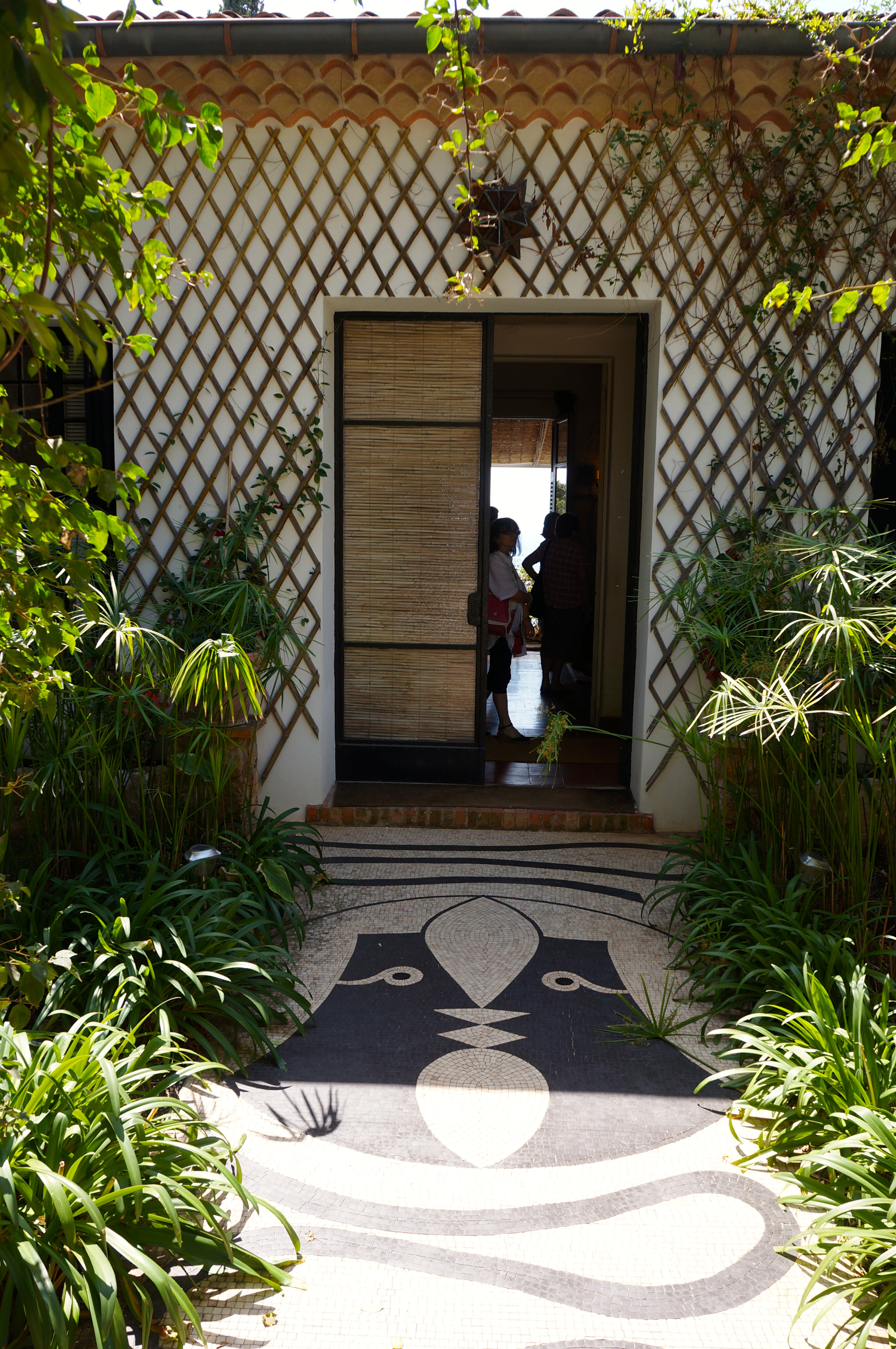
Entrance of Villa Santo Sospir

La Villa Santo Sospir (1952) is a 35-minute amateur or home film directed by Jean Cocteau in which Cocteau takes the viewer on a tour of Francine Weisweiller's villa on the French coast, a major location later used in his film Testament of Orpheus (1960).

The house itself is heavily decorated, mostly by Cocteau (and a bit by Picasso), and we are given an extensive tour of the artwork. Cocteau also shows us several dozen paintings, most of which cover mythological themes. He also proudly shows paintings by Edouard Dermit and Jean Marais and plays around his own home in Villefranche.
