= The Human Voice =

Play written by Jean Cocteau

- Written by: Jean Cocteau
- Genre: Drama, monologue
- Setting: Paris, France

Premiere
- Date: 1930
- Place: Comédie-Française

The Human Voice (French: La Voix humaine) is a monodrama first staged at the Comédie-Française in 1930, written two years earlier by Jean Cocteau. It is set in Paris, where a still-quite-young woman is on the phone with her lover of the last five years. He is to marry another woman the next day, which causes her to despair. The monologue triggers the woman's crippling depression.

== About the play ==
Cocteau's experiments with the human voice peaked with his play La voix humaine. The story involves one woman on stage speaking on the telephone with her (invisible and inaudible) departing lover, who is leaving her to marry another woman. The telephone proved to be the perfect prop for Cocteau to explore his ideas, feelings, and "algebra" concerning human needs and realities in communication.

Cocteau acknowledged in the introduction to the script that the play was motivated, in part, by complaints from his actresses that his works were too writer/director-dominated and gave the players little opportunity to show off their full range of talents. La Voix humaine was written, in effect, as an extravagant aria for Madame Berthe Bovy. Before came Orphée, later turned into one of his more successful films; after came La Machine infernale, arguably his most fully realized work of art. La Voix humaine is deceptively simple — a woman alone on stage for almost one hour of non-stop theatre speaking on the telephone with her departing lover. It is full of theatrical codes harking back to the Dadaists' Vox Humana experiments after World War I, Alphonse de Lamartine's "La Voix humaine", part of his larger work Harmonies poétiques et religieuses and the effect of the creation of the Vox Humana ("voix humaine"), an organ stop of the Regal Class by Church organ masters (late 16th century) that attempted to imitate the human voice but never succeeded in doing better than the sound of a male chorus at a distance.

Reviews varied at the time and since but whatever the critique, the play represents Cocteau's state of mind and feelings towards his actors at the time: on the one hand, he wanted to spoil and please them; on the other, he was fed up with their diva antics and was ready for revenge. It is also true that none of Cocteau's works has inspired as much imitation: Francis Poulenc's opera La Voix humaine, Gian Carlo Menotti's "opera buffa" The Telephone and Roberto Rossellini's film version in Italian with Anna Magnani L'Amore (1948). Pedro Almodóvar's Women on the Verge of a Nervous Breakdown (1988) is also inspired by Cocteau's play. There has also been a long line of interpreters including Simone Signoret, Ingrid Bergman and Liv Ullmann (in the play) and Julia Migenes, Denise Duval, Renata Scotto, Anja Silja and Felicity Lott (in the opera).

According to one theory about how Cocteau was inspired to write La Voix humaine, he was experimenting with an idea by fellow French playwright Henri Bernstein.

== Adaptations ==
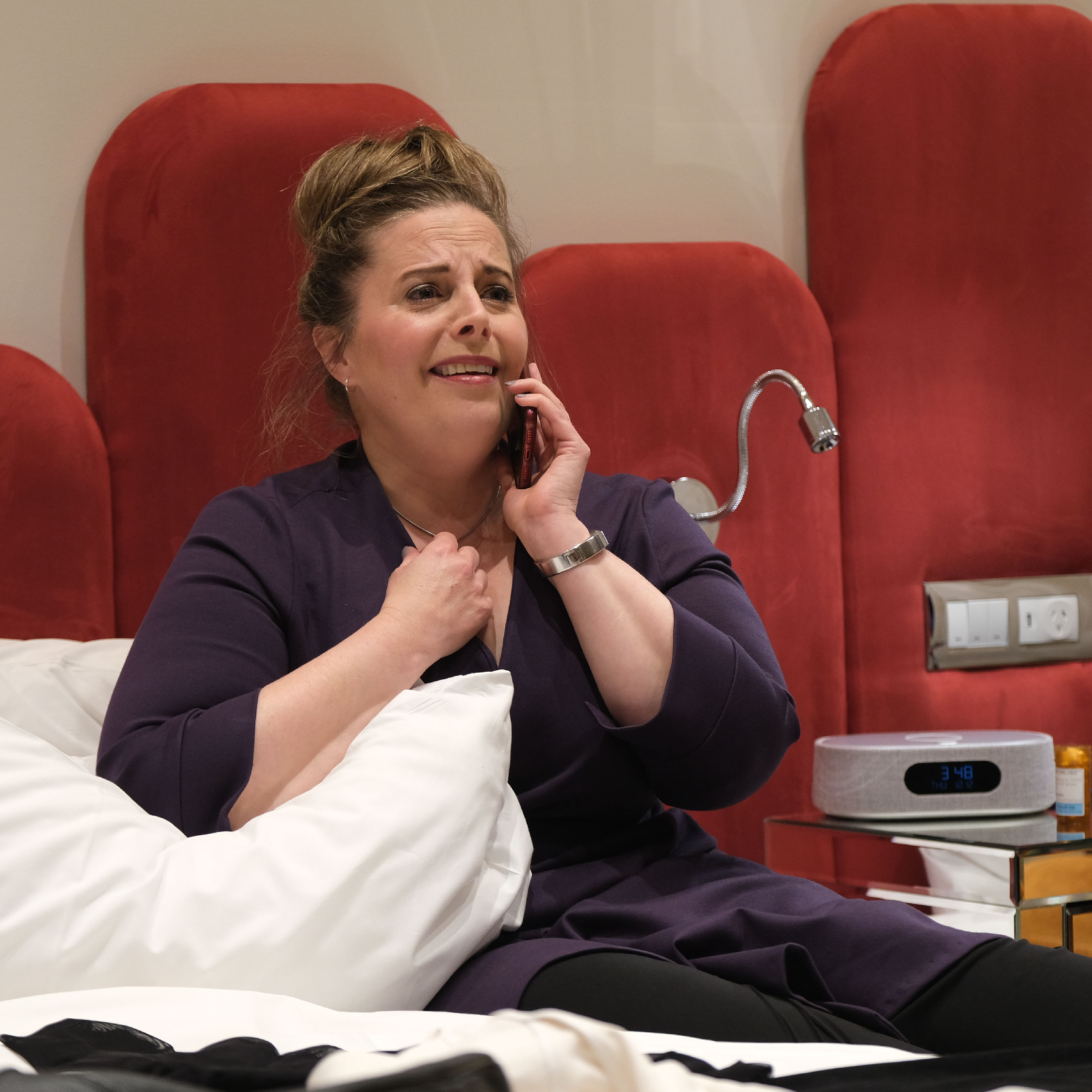
Amanda Atlas in a 2020 New Zealand Opera production of the Francis Poulenc opera The Human Voice

In 1948, Roberto Rossellini directed the film version of the play, an anthology film L'Amore which had two segments, "Il Miracolo" and "Una Voce Umana", the latter based on Cocteau's play. In 1958 Francis Poulenc composed an opera to Cocteau's text. Cocteau loved it: "Mon cher Francis, tu as fixé, une fois pour toutes, la façon de dire mon texte (My dear Francis: you have worked out, once and for all, how to speak what I have written)". On May 4, 1967, the final installment of the television series ABC Stage 67 was a production of the play, starring Ingrid Bergman, who had released a commercial recording of it on Caedmon Records in 1960. There was also a 1998 BBC Radio production by Robin Rimbaud.

It was adapted in short film form in 2014, starring Sophia Loren and directed by Edoardo Ponti, in 2018 starring Rosamund Pike and directed by Patrick Kennedy, and a version titled "The Human Voice" in 2020, directed by Pedro Almodóvar and starring Tilda Swinton, which played out of competition at the 77th Venice International Film Festival. A version starring Elsa Zylberstein and directed by Roger Avary that was filmed in 2018 remains unreleased.

A stage production starring Ruth Wilson ran at the Harold Pinter Theatre in 2022, with minimalist stage design by Jan Versweyveld.
