= Margaret Crosland (writer) =

English literary biographer and translator (1920–2017)

Margaret McQueen Crosland (later Denis, 17 June 1920 – 3 July 2017) was an English literary biographer and translator. She also used the pen name Leonard de Saint-Yves.

== Life and career ==
Born in Bridgnorth, Shropshire in June 1920, Crosland has translated both French and Italian literature. She has written biographies of Colette, Jean Cocteau, Simone de Beauvoir and Edith Piaf, and translated work by writers including the Marquis de Sade, Émile Zola, Colette, Jean Cocteau, Edmond de Goncourt and Cesare Pavese. She also wrote book-length studies of women's writing in Britain and France.

Crosland married Max Denis in January 1950. She died on 3 July 2017, at the age of 97.

== Works ==
=== Translations ===
From French

- The flesh in the mirror by Félicien Marceau. Translated from the French Chair et cuir. London: Vision Press, 1953.
- (ed. and tr. as Leonard de Saint-Yves) Selected writings of de Sade. London: Peter Owen, 1953.
- First poems by Minou Drouet. London: Hamish Hamilton, 1956.
- Paris Album, 1900–1914 by Jean Cocteau. London: W. H. Allen, 1956.
- Opium: the diary of a cure by Jean Cocteau. London: Peter Owen, 1957.
- Then there was fire by Minou Drouet. London: Hamilton, 1957.
- The conquest of fire by Pierre Lacroix.
- Ravel by Vladimir Jankélévitch. New York, London: Grove Press, 1959.
- Elisa by Edmond de Goncourt. London: Neville Spearman, 1959.
- The story of Reynard by Maurice Genevoix. London: Hamish Hamilton, 1959.
- Germany by Joseph Rovan. London, Viking Press. 1959.
- The fifteen wonders of the world by René Poirier. London: Victor Gollancz, 1960.
- French leave by Marcel Mouloudji. London: Neville Spearman, 1962.
- Earth by Émile Zola. London: New English Library, 1962.
- De Sade Quartet by the Marquis de Sade. London: Peter Owen, 1963.
- (tr. with Alan Daventry) A pictorial history of magic and the supernatural by Maurice Bessy. London: Spring Books, 1963.
- Napoleon by Octave Aubry. London: Paul Hamlyn, 1964.
- Eugenie de Franval, and other stories by the Marquis de Sade. Spearman, 1965.
- The gift of indifference by Cécile Arnaud. London: Heinemann, 1965.
- Secrets of the Gotha by Ghislain de Diesbach. London: Chapman & Hall, 1967.
- (tr. with Alan Daventry) The other face of love by Raymond de Becker. London: Neville Spearman & Rodney Books, 1967.
- Stories and drawings by Roland Topor. London: Peter Owen, 1968.
- Le Livre blanc by Jean Cocteau. London: Owen, 1969.
- The other woman by Colette. London: Peter Owen, 1971.
- (tr. & ed. with intro.)Cocteau's world: an anthology of writings by Jean Cocteau. London: Peter Owen, 1972.
- (tr. with David Le Vay) The thousand and one mornings by Colette. London: Owen, 1973.
- Retreat from love by Colette. London: Owen, 1974.
- Duo; and, Le Toutonier: two novels, London: Owen, 1976.
- The life of a simple man by Emile Guillamin. London: Sinclair Browne, 1983.
- The mystified magistrate: four stories by the Marquis de Sade. London: Peter Owen, 1963.
- (tr. with David Le Vay) Across the Acheron by Monique Wittig. London: Peter Owen, 1987.
- The gothic tales of the Marquis de Sade. London: Peter Owen, 1990.
- My life by Edith Piaf. London; Chester Springs, Pa.: Peter Owen, 1990.
- The rear view: a brief and elegant history of bottoms through the ages by Jean Luc Hennig. London: Souvenir Press, 1995.
- The eye of the prophet by Kahlil Gibran. London: Souvenir Press.
- The crimes of love by the Marquis de Sade. London: Peter Owen, 1996.
- The world of the castrati : the history of an extraordinary operatic phenomenon by Patrick Barbier. 1996.
- God remained outside: an echo of Ravensbrück by Geneviève de Gaulle-Anthonioz. London: Souvenir Press, 1999.
- (tr. with Elfreda Powell) Rough trade by Dominique Manotti. London: Arcadia, 2003.

From Italian

- The vampire: the anthology. Translation from the Italian I vampiri tra noi, ed. by Ornella Volta and Valeria Riva. London: N. Spearman, 1963.
- Hebdomeros: a novel by Giorgio de Chirico. London: Peter Owen, 1968.
- Medieval goldsmith's work by Isa Belli Barsali. Feltham: Hamlyn, 1969.
- Precolumbian terracottas by Franco Monti. Feltham: Hamlyn, 1969.
- A mania for solitude: selected poems 1930–1950 by Cesare Pavese. Translated from the Italian. London: Owen, 1969.
- Gothic illuminated manuscripts by Emma Coen Pirani. London: Hamlyn, 1970.
- (tr. and intro.) The memoirs of Giorgio de Chirico by Giorgio de Chirico. London: Peter Owen, 1971.
- European carpets by Michele Campana. London, etc.: Hamlyn, 1974.

=== Other writing ===
- Strange tempe, London: Fortune Press, 1945.
- (ed. with Patricia Ledward) The Happy Yes: An anthology of marriage proposals, London: Ernest Benn, 1949.
- Madame Colette: a provincial in Paris, London: P. Owen, 1953.
- Ballet carnival: a companion to ballet, London: Arco Publishers, 1955.
- Jean Cocteau, London: P. Nevill, 1955.
- Home book of opera. London: Arco Publishers, 1957.
- The young ballet lover's companion, London: Souvenir Press, 1962.
- Ballet lovers' dictionary, London: Arco Publications, 1962.
- Louise of Stolberg, Countess of Albany. Edinburgh: Oliver & Boyd, 1962.
- (ed.) A traveller's guide to literary Europe. London: H. Evelyn, 1965–67.
- (ed.) Selected letters by the Marquis de Sade. Translated by W. J. Strachan. London: Owen, 1965.
- (ed. and intro.) Ten years exile: or memoirs of that interesting period of the life of the Baroness de Staël by Germaine de Staël. Fontwell: Centaur Press, 1968.
- Colette – the difficulty of loving: a biography, London: Owen, 1973.
- Women of iron and velvet, and the books they wrote in France, London: Constable, 1976.
- Raymond Radiguet: a biographical study with selections from his work, London: Peter Owen, 1976.
- (ed. with A. A. Heathcote and M. J. Woods) Spanish studies: literature, 1490–1700.
- (ed. with intro.) The leather jacket: stories by Cesare Pavere. Translated by Alma Murch. London: Quartet Books, 1980.
- Beyond the lighthouse : English women novelists in the twentieth century, London: Constable, 1981.
- Piaf, London: Hodder and Stoughton, 1985.
- (ed. with intro.) To the end of the world by Blaise Cendrars, translated by Alan Brown. London: Peter Owen, 1991.
- (ed. with intro.) Erotica: drawings by Jean Cocteau.
- Simone de Beauvoir: the woman and her work, London: Heinemann, 1992.
- Sade's wife : the woman behind the Marquis, London, CHester Springs, Pa.: P. Owen, 1995.
- The enigma of Giorgio de Chirico, London: Peter Owen, 1999.
- Madame de Pompadour: sex, culture and power, Stroud: Sutton, 2000.
- Meeting & parting: new and selected poems 1941–2003, London: Centaur, 2004.
- The mysterious mistress: the life and legend of Jane Shore, Stroud: Sutton Publishing, 2006.
