= L'Aigle à deux têtes =

Play written by Jean Cocteau

- Original language: French
- Written by: Jean Cocteau

Premiere
- Date: 1946

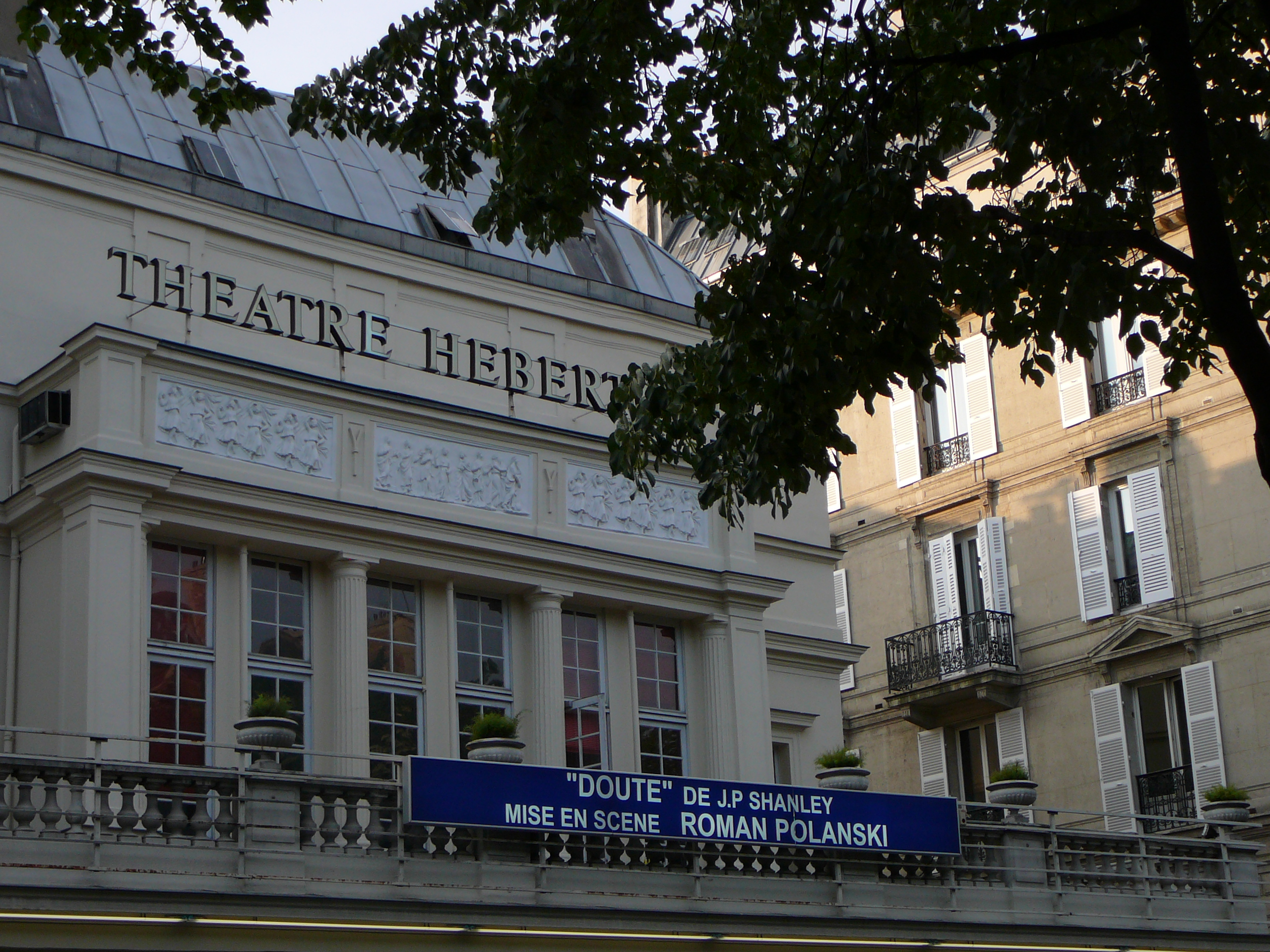
The Théâtre Hébertot, where the first Paris performances took place in November 1946.

L'Aigle à deux têtes is a French play in three acts by Jean Cocteau, written in 1943 and first performed in 1946. It is known variously in English as The Eagle with Two Heads, The Eagle Has Two Heads, The Two-Headed Eagle, The Double-Headed Eagle, and Eagle Rampant. The title refers to the double-headed eagle of heraldry. Cocteau also directed a film of his play which appeared in 1948.

Cocteau said that he took his inspiration for the play from the separate stories of Ludwig II of Bavaria and of the Empress Elisabeth of Austria. Ludwig was found drowned in Lake Starnberg in Bavaria in circumstances which have never been satisfactorily explained. Elisabeth was stabbed in the heart by an assassin while out walking in Geneva. For his portrait of the Queen, Cocteau drew upon the portrait of Elisabeth given by Remy de Gourmont in his Promenades littéraires. He was also concerned to create characters which called for a grand style of acting in a tradition which he saw as being in decline in French theatre. The performances of Edwige Feuillère and Jean Marais in the first French production were an essential part of Cocteau's conception of the play.

== Synopsis ==
On the 10th anniversary of the assassination of the king, his reclusive widow, the Queen, arrives to spend the night at the castle of Krantz. Stanislas, a young anarchist poet who seeks to assassinate her, enters her room, wounded; he looks exactly like the dead king, and the Queen shelters him instead of handing him over to the police. She sees him as the welcome embodiment of her own death, calling him Azraël (the angel of death). An ambiguous love develops between them, uniting them in a bid to outwit the machinations of the court politicians, represented by the Comte de Foëhn, the chief of police, and Édith de Berg, the Queen's companion. In order to remain true to their ideals and to each other, the Queen and Stanislas have to play their parts in a bizarre private tragedy, which the world will never understand.

Act 1 takes place in the Queen's bedroom at Krantz: evening.
Act 2 is set in the castle library: the next morning.
Act 3 is again in the library: the following morning.

== Dramatic analysis ==
Cocteau was interested in juxtaposing two characters who represent opposite ideas, a queen with an anarchist temperament and an anarchist with royalist sympathies, and who depart from those identities as they interact with each other as human beings. Other themes which recur elsewhere in Cocteau's work are the poet's obsession with death, and the fulfilment of love in death (Orphée, Le Sang d'un poète, L'Éternel Retour).

== Productions ==
The play was first performed at the Théâtre Royal des Galeries in Brussels in October 1946, followed by some performances in Lyon. The first Paris performances took place in November 1946 at the Théâtre Hébertot, directed by Jacques Hébertot. The cast included Edwige Feuillère as the Queen, Jean Marais as Stanislas, Silvia Monfort as Édith de Berg, and Jacques Varennes as the Comte de Foëhn. Costumes were by Christian Bérard, sets by André Beaurepaire, and Georges Auric wrote the "Hymne royal" which is heard at the end of the play. The production continued at other theatres in Paris in 1947.

An English version of the play was made by Ronald Duncan under the title The Eagle Has Two Heads. It was first performed at the Lyric Hammersmith in London on 4 September 1946, with Eileen Herlie as the Queen and James Donald as Stanislas. It was directed for the Company of Four by Murray Macdonald. (Ronald Duncan described his version as an "adaptation" rather than a translation.' Cocteau was unhappy with this English version, calling it "preposterous".)

The first New York production was staged at the Plymouth Theatre on 19 March 1947, with Tallulah Bankhead as the Queen and Helmut Dantine as Stanislas. Bankhead had originally cast twenty-two-year-old Marlon Brando as Stanislas, but their work relationship, according to Brando, was uncomfortable and oppressive, both onstage and off. After six weeks of frustrating out-of-town tryouts, she fired Brando in New Haven and recast the role with Dantine in time for the Broadway opening. According to Cocteau, Bankhead made her own alterations to the play, and the production was a flop, running only 29 performances.

== Adaptations ==
- L'Aigle à deux têtes (1948) was Cocteau's own film of his play, using the same principal actors from the Paris stage production.
- L'Aigle à deux têtes (1975) was a French TV version of the play, directed by Pierre Cavassilas.
- Il mistero di Oberwald (1981) was a film of the play directed by Michelangelo Antonioni.
