= Les Chevaliers de la Table ronde =

Les Chevaliers de la Table ronde may refer to:

- Les Chevaliers de la Table ronde, literary circle including Jean Fontaine
- Les Chevaliers de la Table ronde (Hervé), 1866 operetta
- Les Chevaliers de la Table ronde (Cocteau), 1937 play
- Les Chevaliers de la Table ronde (film), 1990 French film with Alain Cuny as Merlin
- Les Chevaliers de la Table ronde (game), French game
