= L'École des veuves =

1936 one-act play by Jean Cocteau

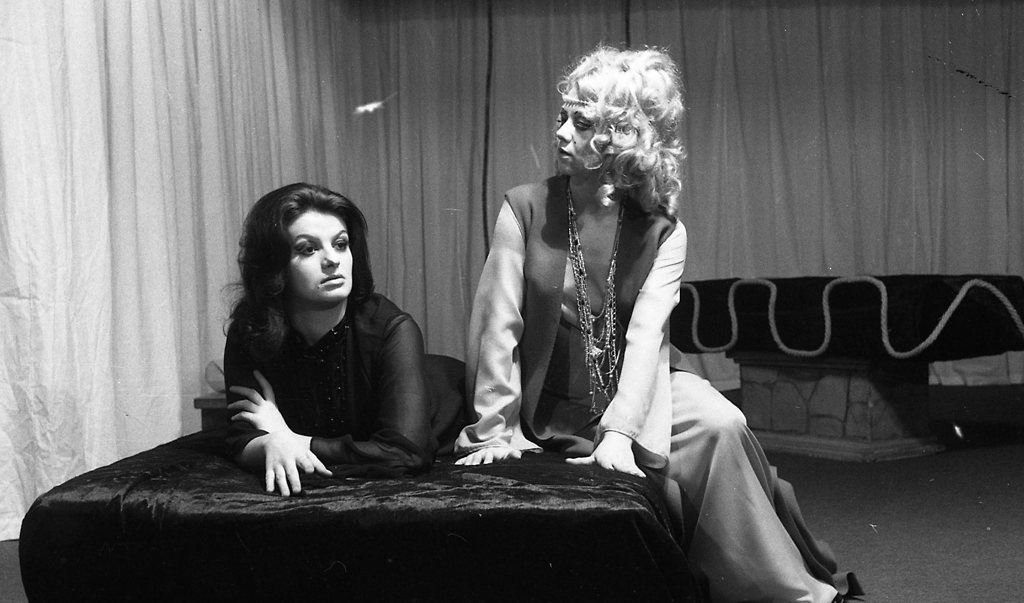
Play by the UL AGRFT in 1969

L'École des Veuves (School for Widows) is a 1936 one-act play (or playlet) written by French dramatist Jean Cocteau. He wrote it originally for the actress Arletty.

The play is modeled after Molière's The School for Wives (1662), and it uses a story from Satyricon by Roman author Petronius.

L'École des veuves was not published until 1949 when it appeared Cocteau's Théatre de Poche. It has been translated in English as School for Widows by Margaret Crosland and published in Cocteau's world: An anthology of writings by Jean Cocteau (1972).
