= Notre-Dame-de-Jérusalem, Fréjus =

Chapel of Notre-Dame-de-Jérusalem
- Chapelle Notre-Dame-de-Jérusalem
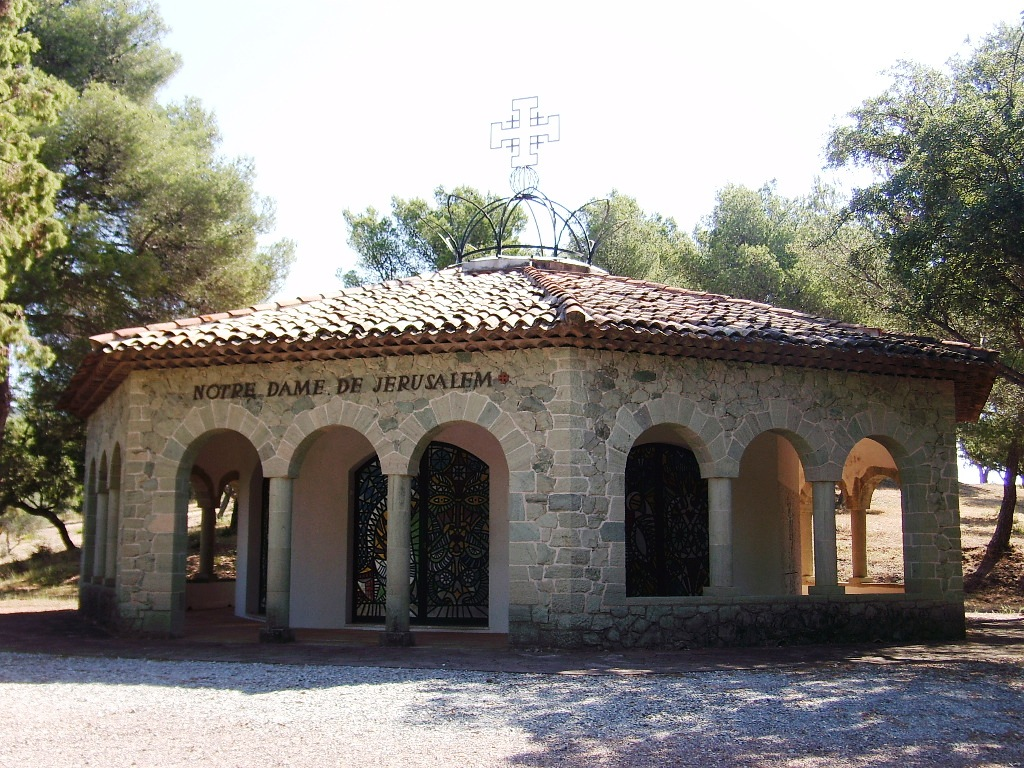
- Exterior of the chapel of Notre-Dame-de-Jérusalem
- Chapel of Notre-Dame-de-Jérusalem
- 43°28′15.18″N 6°46′13.38″E
- Location: Fréjus
- Country: France
- Denomination: Roman Catholic
- Website: Official website

History
- Status: Chapel
- Consecrated: 1965

Architecture
- Functional status: Museum

Monument historique
- Official name: Chapelle Notre-Dame-de-Jérusalem, dite aussi Chapelle Cocteau
- Type: Monument
- Designated: 20 January 1989
- Reference no.: PA00081607
- Heritage designation: Monument Historique
- Architect: Jean Triquenot
- Groundbreaking: 24 February 1963

The chapel of Notre-Dame-de-Jérusalem (Our Lady of Jerusalem) is a Catholic chapel of the Diocese of Fréjus-Toulon. The chapel is the last work of French poet Jean Cocteau.

== History ==
In 1957, Cocteau finished the decoration of the 16th-century Saint Peter Romanesque chapel of Villefranche-sur-Mer. It is the first chapel decorated by Cocteau.

At the origin of Notre-Dame-de-Jérusalem chapel is Louis Martinon, a banker from Nice who wanted a private chapel for the inhabitants of the Tour de Mare district of Fréjus, a 1,200-hectare housing estate that he imagined as an "ideal city" to house a population of artists.

In 1962, Martinon commissioned Jean Cocteau to design the plans and especially the decoration of the chapel. Cocteau was assisted by the architect Jean Triquenot, painter Raymond Moretti, and ceramist Roger Pelissier.

The foundation stone was laid on 24 February 1963 but the unexpected death of the poet on 11 October 1963 interrupted the work. Cocteau's adopted son Édouard Dermit transferred on the cement walls the 150 sketches left by Cocteau and realized the frescoes with the help of charcoal and oil color pencils.

== Description ==
Inspired by the Torcello Cathedral and the Pantheon, Triquenot designed an octagonal chapel with large walls to accommodate the frescoes and an oculus.

From the entrance door, the frescoes of the chapel revolve around the theme of the Passion of Jesus Christ. At the Last Supper, Cocteau gave the 12 apostles his face and the face of his close relatives: Jean Marais, Coco Chanel, Max Jacob, Édouard Dermit, and Francine Weisweiller. Knights of the Order of the Holy Sepulchre are represented on the stained glass of the entrance door and above it. Cocteau also reinterpreted the coat of arms of the Order. A farandole symbolizing the resurrection surrounds the oculus of the rotunda.

The stained glass windows and the floor covered with blue ceramics, evoking the Mediterranean Sea, are the creation of Roger Pélissier. The floor is decorated with a Jerusalem cross and the motto of the Crusaders: "Dieu le veut" (God wills it). The ambulatory is decorated with 6 mosaics made in 1992 from Cocteau's drawings, with the tiles made of pâte de verre from Murano. A red Jerusalem cross, whose 5 wings symbolize the 5 wounds of Christ, is placed on the top of the chapel roof.

The chapel has been listed on the supplementary inventory of historical monuments since 20 January 1989. It was acquired by the City of Fréjus in 1989 and became a museum after its restoration soon after.
