= Pain and Glory (soundtrack) =

Film score by Alberto Iglesias
- Released: 22 March 2019
- Recorded: 2019
- Genre: Film score
- Length: 58:45
- Label: Quartet Records
- Producer: Alberto Iglesias

Alberto Iglesias chronology
Quién te cantará (2018)	Pain and Glory (2019)	The Human Voice (2020)

Pain and Glory (Spanish: Dolor y gloria) is the soundtrack album to the 2019 film of the same name directed by Pedro Almodóvar starring Antonio Banderas, Asier Etxeandia, Leonardo Sbaraglia, Nora Navas, Julieta Serrano, and Penélope Cruz. The original score is written by Alberto Iglesias, Almodóvar's regular collaborator. The album was released through Quartet Records on 22 March 2019, and received numerous accolades.

== Background ==
Pain and Glory is Alberto Iglesias' eleventh collaboration with director Pedro Almodóvar since 1995. Iglesias recalled that Almodóvar mentioned water, while he mentioned light and asked him to travel to the past. Iglesias considered the film to be important as it was asking him more difficult questions and Almodóvar besides him through the whole process, helped him and opened to new possibilities. Focusing on the plot, Iglesias worked on familiar themes of love, loss, desire and regret, adding that the music had to tell the truth and being true to the story.

== Reception ==
Jazz Tangcay of Awards Daily wrote "Plaintive clarinets in Alberto Iglesias' score whisk us back in time to the '60s." Peter Debruge of Variety called it the best score from Iglesias. Mark Kermode of The Guardian wrote "Alberto Iglesias's lovely score perfectly matches the shifting tones of the drama: the warmth of the early childhood scenes, the poignancy of Jacinta's last days, the tensions and anxieties of Salvador's suspended life." Nick Hasted of The Arts Desk felt it to be "sparely ambient". Donald Clarke of The Irish Times wrote "Alberto Iglesias's score wheezes its way to a melancholy tinged with mischievousness." Pete Hammond of Deadline Hollywood wrote "Frequent colleague Albert Iglesias contributes his most lyrical musical score yet." Eric Kohn of IndieWire called it a "wondrous score". Peter Travers of Rolling Stone called it "a supremely lovely score by Alberto Iglesias".

== Track listing ==
No.	Title	Artist(s)	Length
1.	"Salvador sumergido"		2:31
2.	"Geografía y anatomía"	Antonio Banderas; Alberto Iglesias	3:13
3.	"Noche en la estación de trenes I"		1:39
4.	"La cueva de Paterna"		2:32
5.	"Arreglo de cuentas"		2:26
6.	"La addicción"		1:48
7.	"Fumar a escondidas"		2:28
8.	"La torre árabe"		1:41
9.	"El niño maestro"		1:48
10.	"Salvador en la torre"		0:49
11.	"Reconciliación"		1:08
12.	"Piano Bar y coro infantil"		1:43
13.	"La addición II"		2:10
14.	"Huevo de zurcir"		0:52
15.	"Reencuento de los amantes"		2:32
16.	"Escena urbana"		1:11
17.	"La habitación de la madre"		0:52
18.	"Euforia después del beso"		2:02
19.	"Acuarela y TAC"		0:58
20.	"Come sinfonia"	Mina; Alberto Iglesias	2:37
21.	"El primer deseo"		1:56
22.	"Arte popular"		1:56
23.	"Noche en la estación de trenes II"		2:32
24.	"Quirófano"		1:36
25.	"Claqueta final"		7:46
26.	"Encore I"		1:52
27.	"Encore II"		0:45
28.	"Geografía y anatomía"		3:22
Total length:			58:45

== Accolades ==
Year	Award	Category	Recipients	Result	Ref.
2019	Cannes Film Festival	Cannes Soundtrack Award	Alberto Iglesias	Won	
2019	Hollywood Music in Media Awards	Best Original Score – Feature Film	Alberto Iglesias	Nominated	
2020	7th Feroz Awards	Best Original Soundtrack	Alberto Iglesias	Won	
2020	75th CEC Medals	Best Original Score	Alberto Iglesias	Won	
2020	34th Goya Awards	Best Original Score	Alberto Iglesias	Won	
2020	7th Platino Awards	Best Original Score	Alberto Iglesias|	Won	
