= Édouard Dermit =

French actor and painter (1925–1995)

- Born: Antoine Édouard Dermit; 18 January 1925; Istria, Kingdom of Italy
- Died: 15 May 1995 (aged 70); Paris, France
- Other names: Édouard Dermithe; Antoine Dermit
- Occupations: Actor; model; painter
- Years active: 1947–1995
- Spouse: Éliane Dubroca (m. 1965; died 1995)
- Partner: Jean Cocteau (1947–1963)
- Children: 2

Édouard Dermit (born Antoine Édouard Dermit; 18 January 1925 – 15 May 1995), often known affectionately as Doudou, was a French actor and painter. He is best known as the muse, longtime companion, and adopted son of the prominent avant-garde filmmaker and writer Jean Cocteau. Following Cocteau's death, Dermit became his universal legatee and dedicated his life to managing and safeguarding Cocteau's vast artistic estate.

== Early life ==
Dermit was born Antoine Édouard Dermit to a mining family in Gradisca (now part of the Italy–Slovenia border region). In his youth, his family relocated to Northeast France, where Dermit worked under arduous conditions as a "bottom loader" in the iron mines of Lorraine. This strenuous labor contributed to the exceptionally athletic and classical physique that later defined his public and artistic image.

In early 1947, at the age of 22, Dermit relocated to Paris and was hired as a chauffeur and gardener at Jean Cocteau's country villa in Milly-la-Forêt.

== Career ==
=== Debut ===
Dermit's transition to the screen was entirely guided by Cocteau, who recognized that Dermit's natural poise and physical beauty translated powerfully to film. Though he never received formal dramatic training, his underacted, dreamlike line delivery perfectly matched the surreal, poetic atmosphere of Cocteau's cinematic universe.

=== Acting ===
Dermit made his first appearance on screen with a brief, uncredited role as a young palace guard in Cocteau's The Eagle with Two Heads (1948). His true breakthrough came when Cocteau cast him as the co-lead in Les Enfants Terribles (1950). Directed by Jean-Pierre Melville and adapted from Cocteau's infamous 1929 novel, the film features Dermit as Paul, a fragile, deeply intense teenager trapped in an obsessive, isolated world with his sister, played by Nicole Stéphane. Despite Melville's initial reservations about using an untrained actor, Dermit's performance successfully captured the tragic, brooding vulnerability required for the role, earning him critical notice.

Dermit is most famously tied to Cocteau's celebrated Orphic Trilogy. In Orpheus (1950), he was cast in the pivotal role of Jacques Cégeste, a reckless, celebrated young avant-garde poet whose sudden murder by the underworld forces sets the entire supernatural plot into motion. Dermit's portrayal of Cégeste became an iconic visual staple of French New Wave precursor cinema.

A decade later, Dermit reprised the role in The Testament of Orpheus (1960). This final installment served as Cocteau's cinematic farewell and self-analysis. In the film, Dermit's Cégeste serves as a spectral guide who leads the aging poet through a landscape populated by his own artistic creations and real-life friends, including cameos by Pablo Picasso and Yul Brynner.

Following Cocteau's death, Dermit largely stepped away from the film industry, making only one final, nostalgic supporting appearance as Captain Roy in Thomas the Impostor (1965), a project directed by Georges Franju and based on another of Cocteau's early novels.

=== Painting ===
Beyond his work on screen, Cocteau strongly encouraged Dermit to explore his own talents as a visual artist. Dermit took up painting and oil pastels, developing a distinct style that he exhibited at the Galerie Montmorency in Paris during the 1950s and 1960s.

After 1963, his own creative pursuits took a backseat to the monumental task of managing Cocteau's estate. Dermit spent decades archiving letters, protecting copyrights, and managing museum requests. Most notably, he took it upon himself to complete the unfinished artistic projects Cocteau left behind. This included executing the massive, intricate interior wall frescoes for the chapel of Notre-Dame-de-Jérusalem in Fréjus, working carefully from the detailed blueprints and sketches Cocteau had prepared before his death.

== Personal life ==
Captivated by Dermit's striking physical appearance—frequently likened to a Greek god—and his gentle, benevolent demeanor, Cocteau quickly integrated him into his personal and professional life. The two became lovers, and Dermit succeeded the French actor Jean Marais as Cocteau's primary romantic partner and creative muse.

Despite initial friction within Cocteau's inner circle regarding Dermit's working-class background, his unassuming character earned him the lifelong moniker "Doudou". To secure Dermit's financial future and ensure the protection of his intellectual property, Cocteau formally legally adopted Dermit late in life. Upon Cocteau's death on 11 October 1963, Dermit was named his sole heir and universal legatee.

In his later years, Dermit married Eliane Dubroca. The couple resided in the Milly-la-Forêt estate and had two sons, John and Stéphane. His children's godparents included Pablo Picasso's wife Jacqueline Picasso, actor Jean Marais, socialite and arts patron Francine Weisweiller, and industrialist Pierre Bergé.

== Death ==
Édouard Dermit died on 15 May 1995. Dermit died in Paris on 15 May 1995 at the age of 70. He was buried alongside Jean Cocteau in the Saint-Blaise-des-Simples chapel in Milly-la-Forêt.

== Filmography ==
=== Film ===
Year	Title	Role	Notes
1948	The Eagle with Two Heads	Dermit	Debut
1950	Les Enfants Terribles	Paul	
1950	Orpheus	Jacques Cégeste	
1952	La Villa Santo-Sospir	Edouard	Short film
1960	The Testament of Orpheus	Jacques Cégeste	
1961	La farce du chateau	Romano	
1965	Thomas the Impostor	Captain Roy	
