= William Fifield =

American novelist

William Fifield (1916–1987) was an American writer of novels, nonfiction, essays and short stories.

He published several works on Jean Cocteau and recorded Jean Cocteau: A Self-Portrait, A Conversation with William Fifield in French. He also recorded a conversation in English with the mime Marcel Marceau, Marcel Marceau Speaks.

Fifield was the author of a biography of Modigliani and of In Search of Genius, a collection of his conversations on the creative process with Picasso, Cocteau, and other twentieth-century artists and writers, both books published by William Morrow and Company and edited by J. D. Landis.

He won an O. Henry Award short story prize in 1943.

Fifield married Mercedes McCambridge in 1939, and had one son, John Lawrence, in 1941. The two divorced and John Lawrence was adopted by McCambridge's second husband, Fletcher Markle. John Lawrence Markle committed suicide after murdering his wife and two daughters in November 1987. Fifield died a month later.

== Early life and education ==
Fifield was the elder of two sons born to the Reverend L. (Lawrence) Wendell Fifield and Juanita “Nita,” maiden name Sloan.

== Radio career ==
Immediately after graduating, he went to work as a radio announcer, first for CBS and later for NBC. In addition to announcing, he became a program director and wrote scripts for “Suspense,” “Lights Out,” “The Whistler,” and other shows from the golden age of American radio. He also wrote for Orson Welles's radio programs. While working in Hollywood as a scriptwriter, he began publishing short stories in national magazines, winning an O. Henry Award in 1943 for his story "The Fishermen of Patzcuaro."

== Wartime service ==
Fifield was a conscientious objector during World War II, working at three Civilian Public Service camps.

His entry on the CPS Web site for his C.O. worker number, 2819, shows that he was interned at the Metropolitan Research Unit, New York Medical College from February 1945 through January 1946.

He published an account of C.O.s in Harper's Magazine in 1945, titled "Report from a Conscientious Objector."

== Writing ==
In 1950, he moved to Europe to become a full-time writer. The author of several novels, he also wrote essays, a biography of Modigliani, an illustrated history of the great sherry-making families of Spain, and co-wrote an Encyclopedia of Wines & Spirits with Alexis Lichine.

His novel The Devil’s Marchioness was about the notorious seventeenth-century poisoner, the Marquise de Brinvilliers.

He received a Huntington Hartford Foundation Award in 1960 for creative writing. The fellowship funded a stay of one to six months at an artists' colony in Rustic Canyon, a residential neighborhood in Los Angeles, California. It ran from 1951 to 1965 and was supported by Huntington Hartford, a philanthropist and A&P supermarket heir.

During the nearly forty years he lived in Europe, he met and developed friendships with many of the most talented creators of the twentieth century. His book In Search of Genius includes his conversations on the creative process with writers and artists he considered geniuses: Pablo Picasso, Jean Cocteau, Salvador Dalí, Marc Chagall, Joan Miró, Jean Giono, Jean Lurçat, Roberto Rossellini, Robert Graves, and Marcel Marceau.

The Paris Review published his interviews with Picasso, Cocteau, and Graves, reprinting the last two in the literary magazine’s Writers at Work book series. Caedmon Records (now Caedmon Audio) released two of his recorded conversations: Marcel Marceau Speaks (recorded in English), as well as Jean Cocteau: A Self-Portrait, A Conversation with William Fifield in French. In 1973, Editions Stock in Paris published a full-length version of the Cocteau interview, Jean Cocteau par Jean Cocteau. The following year, a monograph Fifield wrote about Cocteau’s life and works, Jean Cocteau, appeared in the Columbia Essays on Modern Writers series, Columbia University Press.

Fifield’s Cocteau works are part of a bilingual series, La série Cocteau / The Cocteau Series, reissued by the Times Two Publishing Company.

== Legacy ==
The papers of William Fifield and other members of his family are stored at Archives West, Orbis Cascade Alliance, William Fifield Papers.
