= The Orphic Trilogy =

Series of three films by Jean Cocteau

The Orphic Trilogy is a series of three French films written and directed by Jean Cocteau:

- The Blood of a Poet, or Le sang d'un poète, 1932
- Orpheus, or Orphée (also the title used in the UK), 1950
- Testament of Orpheus, or Le testament d'Orphée, 1960

The Criterion Collection has released the trilogy as a DVD boxed set (which has since gone out-of-print).
