= The Eagle with Two Heads =

- Directed by: Jean Cocteau
- Screenplay by: Jean Cocteau
- Based on: L'Aigle à deux têtes by Jean Cocteau
- Produced by: Georges Dancigers; Alexandre Mnouchkine
- Starring: Edwige Feuillère; Jean Marais; Jean Debucourt; Silvia Monfort; Jacques Varennes
- Cinematography: Christian Matras
- Edited by: Claude Ibéria; Raymond Leboursier
- Music by: Georges Auric
- Production companies: La Société des Films Sirius; Les Films Ariane
- Distributed by: La Société des Films Sirius
- Release dates: 22 September 1948 (France); 18 December 1948 (United States)
- Running time: 93 minutes
- Country: France
- Language: French
- Box office: 2,408,366 admissions (France)

The Eagle with Two Heads (French title L'Aigle à deux têtes) is a 1948 French drama film directed by Jean Cocteau. It was adapted from his own play L'Aigle à deux têtes which was first staged in Paris in October 1946, retaining the principal actors Edwige Feuillère and Jean Marais from the original theatre production.

== Plot ==
On the 10th anniversary of the assassination of the King, his reclusive widow, the Queen, arrives to spend the night at the castle of Krantz. Stanislas, a young anarchist poet who seeks to assassinate her, enters her room, wounded during his escape from the police. The Queen sees Stanislas, who resembles her dead husband, as the welcome embodiment of her own death, calling him Azrael ("angel of death") after the pseudonym under which Stanislas had published a subversive poem. Instead of handing him over to the authorities, she gives him shelter. An ambiguous love develops between them, uniting them against the machinations of the Court politicians, represented by the Comte de Foëhn, the chief of police, and Édith de Berg, the Queen's reader and chamber maid, who is a secret informer for de Foëhn and the Queen's stepmother, the Archduchess. Having eventually lost their battle against de Foëhn's schemes, Stanislas poisons himself and kills the Queen, as she had ordered him to.

== Cast ==
- Edwige Feuillère as the Queen
- Jean Marais as Stanislas
- Silvia Monfort as Édith de Berg
- Jean Debucourt as Félix de Willenstein
- Jacques Varennes as Comte de Foëhn
- Ahmed Abdallah as Tony
- Yvonne de Bray as the Archduchess
- Édouard Dermit as Dermit, young palace guard (uncredited)

== Production ==
Cocteau's play was produced in Paris in 1946 and 1947, and his decision to make a prompt adaptation for the cinema allowed him to retain the principal actors who had enjoyed personal successes with their roles, especially Edwige Feuillère and Jean Marais. Cocteau declared his intention of following the three-act structure of the play closely, citing his admiration of the methods of Ernst Lubitsch, but he opened out some of the scenes into a wider variety of locations. Filming began in October 1947 at the Château de Vizille, and further shots were filmed at the Studio d'Épinay on the outskirts of Paris.

Christian Bérard supervised the art direction, and the sets and costumes (executed by Georges Wakhévitch and Marcel Escoffier respectively) evoked a royal palace in an imaginary kingdom of 19th century middle-Europe. Georges Auric expanded the music which he had written for the stage production into a full score for the film.

Capucine makes an early appearance.

== Reception ==
The film was released in Paris in September 1948. Its reception among French critics was mixed. It was appreciated for the sumptuous quality of its spectacle and for the elevated performances of its actors. Others however felt that its artificiality belonged to another age and another medium, and that Cocteau had not sufficiently emancipated his film from its theatrical origins.

When the film was shown in New York in 1948 and in London in 1949, the reviewers of both The New York Times and The Times shared a similar perplexity about the film's meaning and purpose. The film has in general not enjoyed the same attention as the others which Cocteau directed in the 1940s.

== Legacy ==
Cocteau's play was adapted again by director Michelangelo Antonioni for his 1980 television production The Mystery of Oberwald.
