= The Human Voice (film) =

2020 short film by Pedro Almodóvar

- Theatrical release poster
- Spanish: La voz humana
- Directed by: Pedro Almodóvar
- Screenplay by: Pedro Almodóvar
- Based on: The Human Voice by Jean Cocteau
- Produced by: Agustín Almodóvar; Esther García
- Starring: Tilda Swinton
- Cinematography: José Luis Alcaine
- Edited by: Teresa Font
- Music by: Alberto Iglesias
- Production company: El Deseo
- Distributed by: Wanda Films; Avalon
- Release dates: 3 September 2020 (Venice); 21 October 2020 (Spain)
- Running time: 30 minutes
- Country: Spain
- Language: English
- Box office: $321,229

The Human Voice (Spanish: La voz humana) is a 2020 Spanish drama short film written and directed by Pedro Almodóvar, based on the play of the same name by Jean Cocteau. It stars Tilda Swinton and is Almodóvar's first film acted in English.

The film had its world premiere at the 77th Venice International Film Festival on 3 September 2020. It was released in Spain on 21 October 2020 by Wanda Films and Avalon.

== Cast ==
- Tilda Swinton
- Agustín Almodóvar
- Miguel Almodóvar
- Pablo Almodóvar
- Diego Pajuelo
- Carlos García Cambero

== Production ==
In February 2020, it was announced Tilda Swinton had joined the cast of the film, with Pedro Almodóvar directing from a screenplay he wrote based upon the play of the same name by Jean Cocteau.

Principal photography was set to begin in April 2020, but was delayed due to the COVID-19 pandemic. Principal photography began on 16 July 2020. Production concluded on 27 July 2020.

== Release ==
The Human Voice had its world premiere at the 77th Venice International Film Festival on 3 September 2020. Later that month, Sony Pictures Classics acquired American distribution rights to the film. It also screened at the New York Film Festival on 24 September 2020, and at the BFI London Film Festival on 17 October 2020. It was released in Spain on 21 October 2020 by Wanda Films and Avalon. In the United States, the film was released in select theatres on 12 March 2021. Pathé acquired the UK rights to the short film, and released it on 19 May 2021 (originally given a 7 November 2020 release) through Buena Vista International via 20th Century Studios; it was the last film released by Pathé under the current Fox–Disney deal at the time, as the company would sign a new deal with Warner Bros. Pictures in June of that year.

== Critical reception ==
On the review aggregator website Rotten Tomatoes, 97% of 64 critics' reviews are positive, with an average rating of 8.1/10. The website's consensus reads: "The Human Voice unites Pedro Almodóvar and Tilda Swinton for a short film whose rich rewards are belied by its abbreviated length." Metacritic, which uses a weighted average, assigned the film a score of 88 out of 100, based on 17 critics, indicating "universal acclaim".

Peter Bradshaw of The Guardian gave the film four out of five stars, describing it as "a tale of someone isolated, regretful, anxious, unable to tell whether current arrangements are contingent or permanent, retreating into gestures of self-immolating despair."
