= La voix humaine =

1958 one-act opera by Francis Poulenc

- Monodrama by Francis Poulenc
- The composer in 1922
- Description: tragédie lyrique
- Translation: The Human Voice
- Language: French
- Based on: The Human Voice by Jean Cocteau
- Premiere: 6 February 1959; Opéra-Comique, Paris

La voix humaine (English: The Human Voice) is a 40-minute, one-act opera for soprano and orchestra composed by Francis Poulenc in 1958. The work is based on the play of the same name by Jean Cocteau, who, along with French soprano Denise Duval, worked closely with Poulenc in preparation for the opera's premiere. Poulenc's tragédie lyrique was first performed at the Théâtre National de l'Opéra-Comique in Paris on 6 February 1959, with Duval as the solo singer and Georges Prêtre conducting; the scenery, costumes and direction were by Cocteau.

The libretto consists of a woman's last phone conversation with her lover, who now loves someone else. During the call, the woman reveals that she has attempted suicide because her lover has abandoned her.

== History ==
=== Cocteau's play ===
Cocteau finished writing La voix humaine in 1928, and the monodrama was premiered two years later. Having been previously criticized for using mechanical effects in his plays, Cocteau sought to reduce his drama to the "simplest of forms". Indeed, the one-act play involves a single character in a single room with a telephone. The character — an anonymous woman referred to only as "Elle" ("she" in French) — has been abandoned by her lover and reveals that she has attempted to commit suicide. The play consists of her last conversation with her lover. As a one-act play, the drama lacks the breaks that would traditionally determine its structure. Instead, Cocteau suggests that the actress's different poses represent different "phases" of the monologue. The structure of the play is further delineated by the phone cutting off frequently without warning.

=== Motivation ===
Upon the success of his second opera Dialogues des Carmélites in 1957, Poulenc was encouraged to compose more works in the genre. Hervé Dugardin, the Paris director of Ricordi Publishers, suggested that Poulenc set Cocteau's monodrama to music, with Maria Callas singing the role of Elle. Poulenc, however, wrote the opera specifically for Denise Duval, who had starred as Blanche de la Force in the Paris Opéra premiere of Dialogues. Poulenc's close work with Duval helped his compositional process because he "knew the details of the soprano's stormy love life, and this helped to cultivate a sense of specificity in the opera." Poulenc also identified with Elle's situation, which allowed him to "pour immense anguish into his opera… Like her he abused sleeping pills, tranquilizers and anti-depressants." He thus immersed himself in a deeply personal project with which he easily connected.

=== Adapting Cocteau's text ===
Poulenc met Cocteau early in his career because of the latter's close relationship with Les Six, a group of six French composers of which Poulenc was a member. The two maintained a close friendship throughout their lives, but Poulenc did not set many of Cocteau's texts prior the composition of La voix humaine, about 40 years after their first encounter. (Note: In a 2003 article, Catherine Miller noted, "In 1919, Poulenc composed the Cocardes based on three poems by Cocteau, but much of his other early work with Cocteau were instrumental works for theatre.") Poulenc himself explained that he waited so many years to set Cocteau's play because he felt that he needed a great deal of experience to perfectly construct such a work.

In composing La voix humaine, Poulenc strove to maintain the emotional effectiveness of Cocteau's original drama. He very carefully adapted Cocteau's text, omitting only those passages that he believed would reduce the emotional tension of the opera. In his article on Poulenc and Cocteau, Denis Waleckx proposes that there are five types of "phases" in Cocteau's play. These phases deal with chronology, psychological evolution, social interaction, telephone problems, and the "remembrance of past happiness". (Note: For a full list of phases, see Waleckx 1999, pp. 325–328.) Poulenc left the chronology, telephone problem, and past happiness phases mostly intact, but cut down on or entirely omitted many of the psychological or social phases. This resulted in a protagonist who was "quieter, more modest, less hysterical, less unbearable, and thereby probably more touching than Cocteau's." Poulenc thereby focused on the relationship of the woman and her lover, while still retaining the key points and overall character of Cocteau's play.

=== Collaboration ===
Poulenc viewed the soprano singing the role of Elle as "a co-composer" of the part. Because Poulenc wrote the role specifically for Duval, the French soprano was his original "co-composer". Duval also helped Poulenc with his adaptation of Cocteau's text. (Note: Although Poulenc initially included a sentimental moment in the opera where Elle speaks about her dog, Duval suggested that the phase be cut because it detracted from the ongoing sense of emotional tension. Poulenc accepted her advice and removed this section from the premiere performance of the opera.) Upon the opera's completion, Poulenc and Duval visited Cocteau, who was responsible for directing and designing costumes and stage décor for the premiere. Cocteau worked closely with Duval and adapted his directions for lighting and costuming to complement her physical attributes.

=== Premiere ===
Poulenc finished his score for voice and piano on 2 June 1958 and spent the next two months orchestrating the work, completing the version for full orchestra on 7 August 1958. The tragédie-lyrique was premiered on 6 February 1959 at the Opéra-Comique, Paris, with Georges Prêtre conducting and Duval performing the role of Elle. The opera met immediate success and went on to be performed at La Scala in Milan, as well as in Portugal, Britain, and the United States.

== Synopsis ==
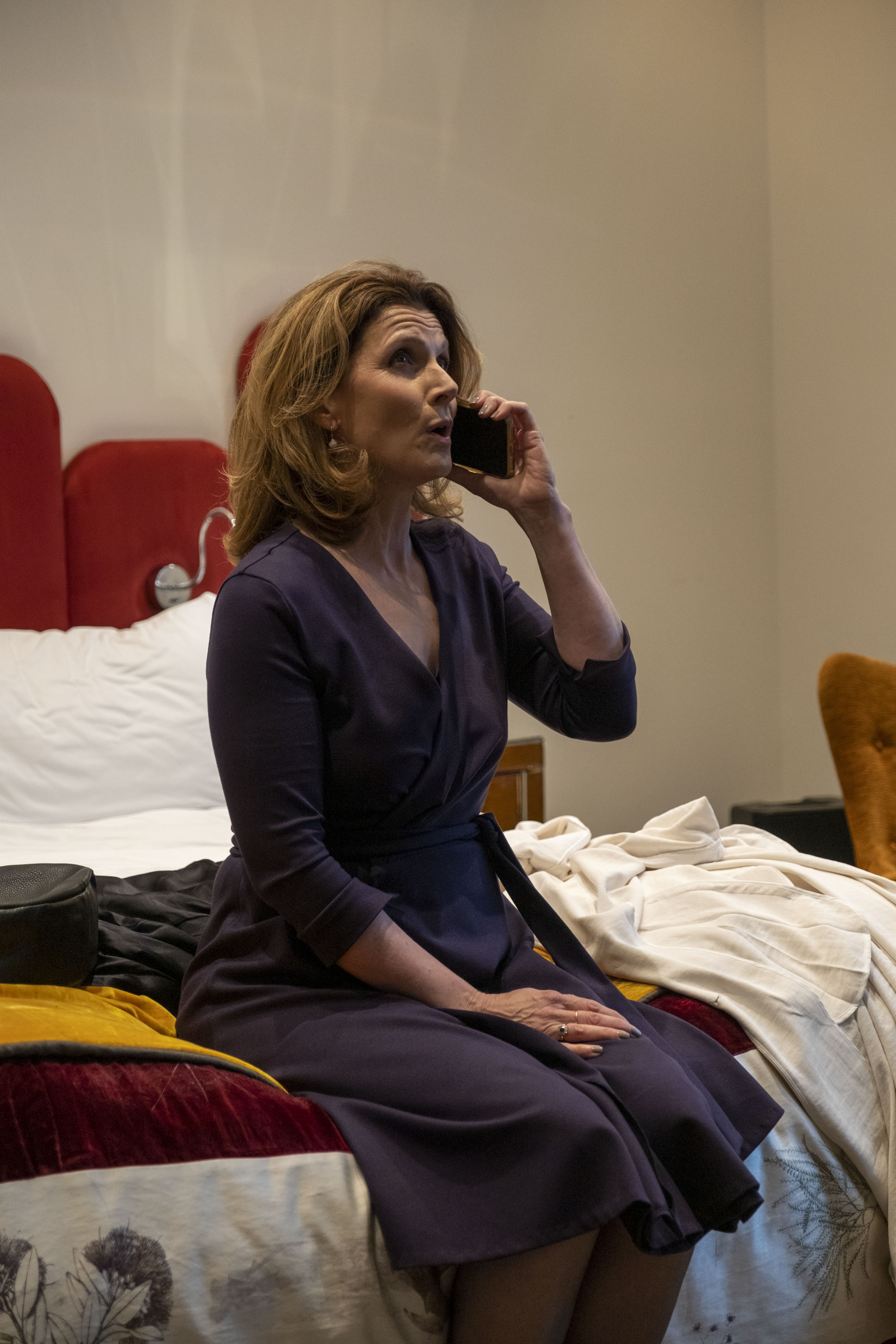
Fiona McAndrew in a 2020 New Zealand Opera production

The curtain opens to reveal a bedroom where a woman (Elle) lies unmoving on the ground. (Note: In his introductory notes for Poulenc's published score, Cocteau compares the room to the site of a murder and the unmoving woman to one who has been assassinated.) Elle changes position once before finally rising. Although Elle makes to leave the room, the phone rings and Elle returns to answer it. Elle receives two wrong numbers before her ex-lover is able to get through to her. Elle lies to him, saying that she went out with her friend Marthe the previous night, and that she took one pill to help her fall asleep when she returned. The couple discusses their past relationship, and Elle blames herself for their problems, claiming, "Tout est ma faute." Throughout their conversation, they experience numerous telephone problems, and their connection finally cuts out completely. When Elle calls her lover's home phone, she discovers that he is not there and assumes that he is at a restaurant. He calls her back, and Elle reveals that she has lied during their conversation; instead of going out with Marthe the previous night, she took twelve sleeping pills in an attempted suicide. She then called Marthe, who arrived with a doctor to save her. Elle suddenly hears music in the background, and grows suspicious that her lover is at the home of his new girlfriend. Elle expresses her suspicions to him several times until the end of the opera, but he never admits to his true location. Elle also reveals her obsession with the telephone, explaining that she has slept with it in her bed for the past two nights. Their connection fails once again, and Elle panics. Her lover calls her back once more, and Elle informs him that she now has the telephone cord wrapped around her neck. Telling him she loves him over and over, she sinks into her bed and drops the receiver.

== Instrumentation ==
La voix humaine is scored for full symphony orchestra with reduced dimensions, so that the sung text is easily understandable. The entire orchestra rarely plays at once; such moments occur only when the soprano does not sing, or when her voice lyrically rises above the orchestra. Poulenc writes coloristically, using different combinations of instruments to achieve certain effects. The instrumentation listed in Poulenc's score is as follows:

- 2 flutes (2nd doubling piccolo)
- 1 oboe
- 1 English horn
- 2 clarinets in B-flat
- 1 bass clarinet
- 2 bassoons
- 2 horns
- 2 trumpets in C
- 1 trombone
- 1 tuba
- 1 percussion: timpani, cymbals, tambourine, xylophone
- 1 harp
- strings (violins 1 and 2, viola, cello, contrabass)

== Version with piano accompaniment ==
Poulenc did not sanction public performances of the opera in the version with piano accompaniment during his lifetime. In 2010 or early 2011, Rosine Seringe, Poulenc's niece, gave dispensation to Felicity Lott and Graham Johnson to record a performance for DVD of the piano accompaniment version. This video recording, made by Champs Hill Records in 2011, was the first commercial recording of this version. Subsequently, recordings and live performances of the piano accompaniment version of the opera have increased in frequency.

== Musical structure ==
=== Treatment of the voice ===
Example 1: 3 after no. 24

Poulenc's writing for the voice is recitative-like in style, representing the natural inflections of speech and, in the case of this particular drama, imitating a phone conversation through its frequent pauses and silences. Poulenc rejects his previous lyricism, opting for a fragmentary, declamatory approach to the voice. Common characteristics of Poulenc's vocal lines include multiple repeated notes, few intervals greater than a fifth, much step-wise motion and motion by a third, and rhythm and accents designed to reflect actual speech patterns, especially "the pauses and hesitations of a phone conversation." Keith W. Daniel notes that out of the 780 measures of music in Poulenc's work, 186 are for solo voice without orchestral accompaniment, adding to the impression of a real telephone conversation. Many of the techniques described above are present in Example 1.

Example 2: 3 before no. 63

Poulenc strays from the recitative in highly dramatic passages, including when Elle sings of her suicide attempt of the previous night. This section is more lyrical and tonal, as can be seen in Example 2. Here, the vocal line more resembles an aria, especially as it builds toward its high point in the nine-eight measure, and the orchestra accompanies the voice in a waltz. The harmony, meanwhile, is a dominant prolongation in C (minor), and indeed, the orchestra resolves to C (major) in the following measure. Poulenc's vocal writing shows a strong dedication to maintaining the dramatic effect of Cocteau's text. The recitative-like passages clearly deliver the libretto, while the aria-like passages illustrate the soprano's passion and anguish.

=== Treatment of the orchestra ===
Example 3: No. 1 ("Exasperated waiting" motif)

Poulenc uses the orchestra to connect the soprano's fragmented vocal lines, unifying the piece as a whole. Unlike his treatment of the soprano voice, Poulenc gives the orchestra many lyrical motifs, writing in the preface his score, "L'œuvre entière doit baigner dans la plus grande sensualité orchestrale" ("The entire work must bathe in the largest orchestral sensuality"). He unifies the opera through these motifs, of which Denis Waleckx identifies fourteen. (Note: For a labeled chart of these fourteen motifs, see Waleckx 1999, pp. 336–338.) These motifs relate to Elle's state of mind, such as those representing her "exasperated waiting", and to situations out of her control, such as her "happy memory". The first of these motifs is shown in Example 3.

Example 4: No. 41 ("Endurance" motif)

Daniel, however, suggests that only nine of Waleckx's examples are true motifs, while the remaining one- or two-bar phrases employ a cellular technique in which a short phrase is presented, then repeated once or twice. What Waleckx cites as the "Endurance" motif (see Example 4), Daniel uses to illustrate Poulenc's cellular technique. Despite their different interpretations, both authors agree that the primary function of the orchestra is to unify the opera into a cohesive work. As Daniel explains, "If La voix humaine succeeds as a drama, it is because of the vocal writing; but if it succeeds as a piece of music, as an opera, it is because of the orchestra."

Example 5: No. 5

Other functions of the orchestra include the representation of Elle's agitation while trying to reach her lover and the jazz she hears on her lover's side of the phone conversation. Musicologist and professor Michal Grover-Friedlander also suggests that the orchestral music can symbolize the lover's side of the phone conversation. Perhaps the most important orchestral function other than unifying the overall work is the portrayal of the telephone ringing through repeated sixteenth notes on the xylophone, shown in Example 5. Although the pitch and the duration of the ringing changes throughout the opera, the timbre of the xylophone is only ever used to represent the "voice" of the telephone, making it easily identifiable. The phone cutting off and re-ringing divides the opera into natural sections and creates a comprehensible structure through which the audience understands the drama. The orchestra is therefore essential to unifying and organizing the opera.

=== Use of tonality ===
La voix humaine stands out from Poulenc's previous works because it is marked by a certain tonal ambiguity. Poulenc achieves this sensation through the avoidance of traditional harmonic functions and the preponderance of unresolved dissonances, diminished structures, and progressions of chromatically-related chords. Although some passages—most often those in which the voice becomes more lyrical—have a clear tonal center, the tonally ambiguous sections are much more frequent in Poulenc's score. Grover-Friedlander suggests that the music is motivically, rather than tonally, driven. Yet in these motives, she identifies a number of tonal references, including "half steps or leading notes, sevenths, or appoggiaturas, which raise expectations for tonal functioning and tonal resolutions. Poulenc's motivic, cell-like aesthetics does not undermine a sense of totality, but treats it as constantly deferred, or in motion." Poulenc thereby uses tonal techniques in a more modern, tonally ambiguous harmonic language.

== Selected discography ==
=== Standard version with orchestra ===
- Denise Duval; Orchestre du Théâtre National de l'Opéra-Comique, Georges Prêtre. EMI (1959)
- Wenche Foss; Norwegian Radio Orchestra, Øivin Fjeldstad. (Full title: Stemmen / La voix humaine. Norwegian libretto by Pauline Hall. TV movie. See link below.) NRK. CD. 1963.
- Jane Rhodes. Orchestre National de France. Jean-Pierre Marty. INA Mémoire vive IMV015 (1976).
- Carole Farley. Adelaide Symphony Orchestra. José Serebrier. Varèse Sarabande. CD (1981)
- Carole Farley. Scottish Chamber Orchestra. José Serebrier. (Full title: Poulenc: La voix humaine; Menotti: The Telephone. Newman movie.) VAI (DVD, 1990)
- Julia Migenes. Orchestre National de France. Georges Prêtre (director: Peter Medak). Kultur. DVD (1990)
- Françoise Pollet. Orchestre National de Lille. Jean-Claude Casadesus. Harmonia Mundi. CD (1992)
- Pauline Vaillancourt. Orchestre Chants libres. Jean-Eudes Vaillancourt. SNE. CD. 1995.
- Felicity Lott. Orchestre de la Suisse Romande. Armin Jordan. (Full title: La voix humaine; La dame de Monte-Carlo.) Harmonia Mundi (2001)
- Jessye Norman. Orchestre de Paris. David Robertson. (Live in Paris). Premiere Opera (2002)
- Anne-Sophie Schmidt. Orchestre Ostinato. Jean-Claude Casadesus. Kultur (DVD, 2005)
- Barbara Hannigan. Orchestre de l'Opéra national de Paris. Esa-Pekka Salonen. Arthaus Musik (DVD, 2018)
- Veronique Gens. Orchestre National de Lille. Alexandre Bloch. Alpha Classics (2021)

=== Piano version ===
- Felicity Lott, Graham Johnson. Champs Hill Records (DVD, 2013)
- Caroline Casadesus, Jean-Christophe Rigaud. Ad Vitam (CD, 2017)
- Daniela Mazzucato, Marco Scolastra. Brilliant Classics (CD, 2019)

== Notes, references and sources ==
Notes

Sources

- Daniel, Keith W. (1982). Francis Poulenc: His Artistic Development and Musical Style. Ann Arbor, US: UMI Research Press. ISBN 978-0-8357-1284-2.
- Evans, Rian (2016-06-05). "La voix humaine review – intimate invitation to a lover's betrayal". The Guardian.
- Hell, Henri (1959). Francis Poulenc. Translated by Edward Lockspeiser. New York: Grove Press. OCLC 1268174.
- Grover-Friedlander, Michal (2002). "The Call of the Human Voice in Poulenc's "La voix humaine"". In Linda Phyllis Austern (ed.). Music, Sensation, and Sensuality. New York: Routledge. ISBN 978-0-8153-3421-7.
- Ivry, Benjamin (1996). Francis Poulenc. London: Phaidon Press. ISBN 978-0-7148-3503-7.
- Lott, Felicity; Johnson, Graham (2014). Poulenc: La voix humaine (piano version). Presto Music. CHRBR045.
- Machart, Renaud (1995). Poulenc (in French). Paris: Seuil. ISBN 978-2-02-013695-2.
- Miller, Catherine (2003). "Jean Cocteau et les compositeurs du Groupe des Six: Amitiés et collaborations musico-littéraires". Revue belge de Musicologie. 57 (57): 201–213. JSTOR 4148300.
- Poulenc, Francis (1959). La voix humaine: Tragédie lyrique en un acte. Paris: Ricordi. OCLC 23656003.
- Sams, Jeremy (2002). "Voix humaine, La (The Human Voice)". Grove Music Online (8th ed.). Oxford University Press. doi:10.1093/gmo/9781561592630.article.O905501. ISBN 978-1-56159-263-0. (subscription, Wikilibrary access, or UK public library membership required)
- Waleckx, Denis (1999). "A Musical Confession: Poulenc, Cocteau and La voix humaine". In Sidney Buckland; Myriam Chimènes (eds.). Francis Poulenc: Music, Art, and Literature. Brookfield, US: Ashgate. ISBN 978-1-85928-407-0.
