= Thomas the Impostor =

- Directed by: Georges Franju
- Screenplay by: Jean Cocteau; Michel Worms; Georges Franju
- Based on: A novel by Jean Cocteau
- Produced by: Eugene Lepicier
- Starring: Emmanuele Riva; Fabrice Rouleau; Jean Servais
- Cinematography: Marcel Fradetal
- Edited by: Gilbert Natot
- Music by: Georges Auric
- Production company: Filmel
- Distributed by: Compagnie Commerciale Française Cinématographique (CCFC)
- Release date: 5 May 1965 (France)
- Running time: 93 minutes
- Country: France
- Language: French

Thomas the Impostor (French: Thomas l'imposteur) is a 1965 French drama film directed by Georges Franju and starring Emmanuelle Riva, Fabrice Rouleau, Sophie Dares, Jean Marais and Charles Aznavour. It is based on a novel of the same name by Jean Cocteau.

== Plot ==
The film is set during World War I, as Paris is expected to fall to the Germans. The Princesse de Bormes, a widow, helps wounded soldiers by evacuating them from the front and bringing them to her villa in Paris for medical care. However, the authorities will not give the Princess and the soldiers passes to return to Paris. The situation changes when an innocent 16-year-old boy, Guillaume Thomas de Fontenoy, joins the authorities and is mistaken as the nephew of the popular General de Fontenoy. Thomas is able to use his position of posing as the general's nephew to cut through the red tape, in order to help the Princess. She is entranced by Thomas, and her daughter, Henriette, falls in love with him. However, Thomas feels impelled to see more war action. Later, he is caught behind enemy lines when he is moved with a military unit into the heat of battle.

== Cast ==
- Emmanuelle Riva as Princesse de Bormes
- Jean Servais as Pasquel-Duport
- Fabrice Rouleau as Guillaume Thomas de Fontenoy
- Sophie Darès as Henriette
- Michel Vitold as Dr. Vernes
- Charles Aznavour
- Jean-Roger Caussimon as Bishop
- Édouard Dermit as Captain Roy
- Hélène Dieudonné as Thomas' aunt
- Gabrielle Dorziat as Cartomancienne
- Bernard Lavalette as Dr. Gentil
- Jean Magis as Pagot
- Jean Marais as Narrator (voice)
- André Méliès as Elderly man at the ball
- Jean Ozenne
- Christian Scheyder as Young priest
- Édith Scob as Nurse
- Rosy Varte as Mme. Valiche

== Release ==
Thomas the Impostor was released in France on 5 May 1965.

== Reception ==
In a contemporary review from the Monthly Film Bulletin, it was noted that the film treated war as "fantasy" with Franju's film as being an "almost fairy-tale fantasy of figures moving in a mystical land where everything seems predetermined" and noted that "Emmanuele Riva gives a hauntingly beautiful performance as the Princess, and Fabrice Rouleau looks exactly right as Thomas; and the commentary, finely spoken by Jean Marais, is for once in accord with the images and mood of the film." The review concluded that "Franju has captured the spirit of Cocteau's novel, the point at which the surface glamour of war becomes the awful reality of its suffering."
