= Orpheus (play) =

Play written by Jean Cocteau

Orpheus, original title Orphée, is a stage play written by Jean Cocteau, produced in Paris 1926 by Georges Pitoëff and Ludmilla Pitoëff, with decors by Jean Hugo and costumes by Coco Chanel.

The play was the first major work for the theater written by Cocteau. It is based on the myth of Orpheus, dealing largely with the supernatural. While contemporary critics called the work "superficial," it has later been called "a brilliantly conceived homage to the supernatural". Cocteau later, rather loosely, adapted the play to the better known film Orpheus (1950).

== Plot ==
The scene is Orpheus and Eurydice's home in Thrace. There is a mirror on the left wall and at stage rear a white horse, protruding from a niche. As the play begins Orpheus is trying to interpret a message that the horse is tapping out with his hoof. Eurydice expresses her jealousy for the supernatural nag who takes so much of her husband's time. Orpheus angrily replies that the horse brings him phrases from the unknown that are more astonishing than all the poems in the world. The poem the horse taps out for Orpheus reads "Madame Eurydice Reviendra Des Enfers" ("Madam Eurydice Will Come Back From Hell"). Orpheus enters the poem in a contest but the judges are infuriated because the initial letters of the words spell "MERDE" (English: "SHIT").

While Orpheus is at the contest Eurydice is murdered by her ex-friends, the Bacchantes. Returning, Orpheus decides to rescue her from death. Instructed by the angel Heurtebise, he passes through the mirror and brings Eurydice back to life, but life together is impossible as he is not allowed to look at her. The Bacchantes return to harass Orpheus, claiming he has submitted an obscene poem. Orpheus is decapitated and Eurydice leads him back through the mirror. The angel puts Orpheus's head on a pedestal, where, in answers to questions from the police, it announces it is Jean Cocteau and gives Cocteau's address, 10 rue d'Anjou.
