= Francine Weisweiller =

Brazilian-born French socialite (1916–2003)

Francine Weisweiller (née Worms; 9 January 1916 – 8 December 2003) was a Brazilian-born French socialite and patron of Yves Saint Laurent and Jean Cocteau.

== Biography ==
She was born Francine Worms on 9 January 1916 in São Paulo, the daughter of prosperous French parents of Jewish descent. Her father was a jeweler. The family returned to France in 1919.

Francine Worms married at age 17 and divorced after a couple of months. For a while she worked as a beautician and, at the outbreak of World War II, as a nurse. Her parents had returned to Brazil.

She married American millionaire Alec Weisweiller in June 1941. The couple moved to Southern France, where their daughter Carole was born in 1942.

After WWII, they moved to 4 Place des Etats-Unis in Paris, where their neighbours were Marie-Laure and Charles de Noailles. Francine Weisweiller became an early patron of Yves Saint Laurent.

The Weisweillers met Jean Cocteau during the filming of Les enfants terribles (they were introduced by Francine's cousin, Nicole Stéphane). Francine persuaded her husband to invest in the film, and some scenes were filmed in their house.

Weisweiller and Jean Cocteau became close friends, with Cocteau and some of his entourage living with her in her villa Santo Sospir at Saint-Jean-Cap-Ferrat from 1950 to the early 1960s. Cocteau decorated the interior walls of the villa and made a film about it, La Villa Santo-Sospir (1952). He dedicated his play Bacchus to Francine Weisweiller. Cocteau's Le Testament d'Orphée (1960), sponsored by Francine Weisweiller, was partly filmed in the villa and on her yacht, and she and her butler had small roles in the film.

In 1960, she fell in love with writer Henri Viard and her friendship with Cocteau cooled. She reconciled with Cocteau shortly before his death in 1963.

Francine Weisweiller died on 8 December 2003 in Saint-Jean-Cap-Ferrat, aged 87.
