= Orpheus (film) =

1950 French film by Jean Cocteau

- Theatrical release poster
- Directed by: Jean Cocteau
- Written by: Jean Cocteau
- Produced by: André Paulvé
- Starring: Jean Marais; François Périer; María Casares; Marie Déa
- Cinematography: Nicolas Hayer
- Edited by: Jacqueline Sadoul
- Music by: Georges Auric
- Distributed by: DisCina
- Release dates: 29 September 1950 (France); 29 November 1950 (United States)
- Running time: 95 minutes
- Country: France
- Language: French
- Box office: 1,149,396 admissions (France)

Orpheus (French: Orphée [ɔʁfe]; also the title used in the UK) is a 1950 French romantic fantasy tragedy film directed by Jean Cocteau and starring Jean Marais. It is the central part of Cocteau's Orphic Trilogy, alongside The Blood of a Poet (1930) and Testament of Orpheus (1960). Set in contemporary Paris, the film is a variation on the Greek myth of Orpheus and Eurydice, and is partially based on Cocteau's 1926 play of the same title.

== Plot ==
Orpheus, a famous poet, visits the Café des Poètes. A Princess and Cégeste, a handsome young poet whom she supports, arrive. The drunken Cégeste starts a brawl. When the police arrive and attempt to take Cégeste into custody, he breaks free and flees, only to be run down by two motorcycle riders. The Princess has the police place Cégeste into her car and orders Orpheus to come with her as a witness. Once in the car, Orpheus discovers Cégeste is dead. They drive to a chateau accompanied by the two motorcycle riders as abstract poetry plays on the radio.

At the ruined chateau, the Princess reanimates Cégeste into a zombie-like state, and they and the motorcycle riders (who are the Princess' henchmen) disappear into a mirror, leaving Orpheus alone. He wakes in a desolate landscape, where he stumbles on the Princess' chauffeur, Heurtebise, who has been waiting for Orpheus to arrive. Heurtebise drives Orpheus home, where Orpheus' pregnant wife Eurydice, a police inspector, and Eurydice's friend Aglaonice (head of the "League of Women”, an allusion to the Maenads, and apparently in love with Eurydice) discuss Orpheus' mysterious disappearance. Orpheus refuses to explain the details of the previous night to his wife or the inspector. He invites Heurtebise to live in his house and to store the Princess' Rolls-Royce in Orpheus' garage. Eurydice attempts to tell Orpheus that she is pregnant, but he rebuffs her.

While Heurtebise falls in love with Eurydice, Orpheus becomes obsessed with listening to the abstract poetry which only comes through the Rolls' radio, and it is revealed that the Princess is an incarnation of Death.

When Eurydice is killed by Death's henchmen, Heurtebise proposes to lead Orpheus into the Underworld in order to reclaim her. Orpheus reveals that he has fallen in love with Death, who has visited him in his dreams. Orpheus enters the afterlife by donning a pair of surgical gloves and walking into a mirror, and he and Heurtebise traverse the Zone, a ruined city inhabited by people apparently unaware that they are dead.

In the Underworld, Orpheus finds himself as a plaintiff before a tribunal which interrogates all parties involved in the death of Eurydice. The tribunal declares that Death has illegally claimed Eurydice, and they return her to life on one condition: Orpheus may not look upon her again, or else she will return to the underworld. Orpheus agrees and returns home with Eurydice and Heurtebise, who has been assigned by the tribunal to assist them.

Eurydice visits the garage where Orpheus listens to the car radio and sits in the back seat. When Orpheus glances at her in the mirror, she disappears. A mob from the Café des Poètes arrives targeting Orpheus, who they accuse of murdering Cégeste. Orpheus confronts them, armed with a pistol given to him by Heurtebise, but he is disarmed and shot. Orpheus dies and finds himself in the Underworld. He declares his love to Death, who has decided to die herself in order that he might become an “immortal poet”. The tribunal sends Orpheus and Eurydice back to the living world with no memories of the previous events; Orpheus learns that he is to be a father, and his life begins anew. Death and Heurtebise walk through the ruins of the Underworld to await judgment from the tribunal.

== Main cast ==
- Jean Marais as Orpheus
- François Périer as Heurtebise
- María Casares as The Princess / Death
- Marie Déa as Eurydice
- Henri Crémieux as L'éditeur
- Juliette Gréco as Aglaonice
- Roger Blin as The Poet
- Édouard Dermit as Jacques Cégeste
- René Worms as Judge
- Jean-Pierre Melville as the hotel manager (uncredited)
- Jean-Pierre Mocky as the bandleader (uncredited)

== Production ==
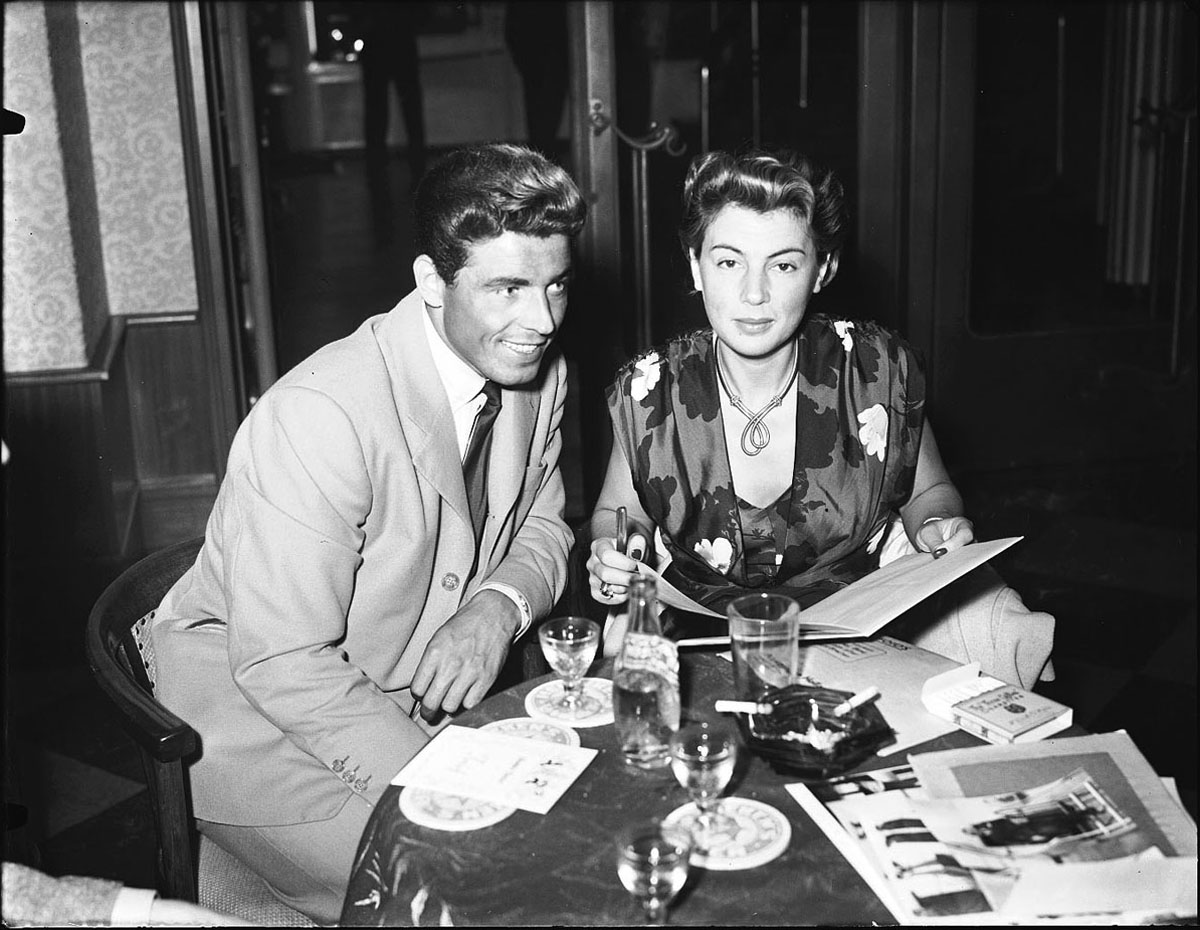
Édouard Dermit and Marie Déa at the premiere of Orpheus, Amsterdam

In his autobiography, the actor Jean-Pierre Aumont claimed that Cocteau wrote the film for him and his then-wife Maria Montez but decided to use other actors.

=== Filming ===
Filming took place from September 12 to November 16, 1949, in Paris, at Porte des Lilas for the opening scene in Café des Poètes (named specifically for the film), meant to evoke the Café de Flore of the Saint-Germain-des-Prés district and Place des Vosges when Orpheus tries to catch up with the princess who appears and disappears around the marketplace. Filming also took place in the Vallée de Chevreuse and in particular in the ruins of the Saint-Cyr military academy, bombed during the Second World War. In the ruins, the sound recording was often interfered with by the whistles of locomotives passing nearby. During editing, Cocteau did not erase this unplanned sound effects, but rather preserved them as a “natural echo of the modern world”. It was on a 1,500-square-metre (16,000 sq ft) set in the Pathé Cinémas studios on rue Francoeur in Paris that Cocteau had a sloping alley built, which Jean Marais and François Périer ran down . Director Jean-Pierre Melville appears as a hotel manager and Jean-Pierre Mocky as a sidekick, sitting next to the gang leader standing on the bar terrace.

=== Effects ===
The film is noted for its wide array of practical and post-production effects, notably “liquid” mirrors (represented by close-ups of a vat of mercury), landscapes filmed in negative, sequences shot in reverse, a vertical shot of a plateau on the ground (when Orpheus and Heurtebise return for the second time to the Underworld), superimposition (characters appearing or disappearing, Heurtebise being able to move while seemingly standing still) and mirrors spontaneously breaking.

Marais wrote that “Cocteau had certain sets built so that the walls of the houses became the floor and the ground became the wall: thus our movement was made more difficult and was restricted by gravity. That day, I saw that the technical team was sceptical, but the next day, at the screening, they were howling with enthusiasm.”

== Themes and interpretations ==
Cocteau wrote in The Art of Cinema:

“The three basic themes of Orphée are:

1. The successive deaths through which a poet must pass before he becomes, in that admirable line from Mallarmé, tel qu'en lui-même enfin l'éternité le change—changed into himself at last by eternity.
2. The theme of immortality: the person who represents Orphée's Death sacrifices herself and abolishes herself to make the poet immortal.
3. Mirrors: we watch ourselves grow old in mirrors. They bring us closer to death.

The other themes are a mixture of Orphic and modern myth: for example, cars that talk (the radio receivers in cars).

Orphée is a realistic film; or, to be more precise, observing Goethe's distinction between reality and truth, a film in which I express a truth peculiar to myself. If that truth is not the spectator's, and if his personality conflicts with mine and rejects it, he accuses me of lying. I am even astonished that so many people can still be penetrated by another's ideas, in a country noted for its individualism.

While Orphée does encounter some lifeless audiences, it also encounters others that are open to my dream and agree to be put to sleep and to dream it with me (accepting the logic by which dreams operate, which is implacable, although it is not governed by our logic).

I am only talking about the mechanics, since Orphée is not at all a dream in itself: through a wealth of detail similar to that which we find in dreams, it summarizes my way of living and my conception of life”.

== Reception ==
Orpheus is Jean Cocteau's most acclaimed cinematic work. It won the International Film Critics Award at the 1950 Venice Film Festival.

The Lexikon des Internationalen Films ("Encyclopedia of International Film") writes: “In terms of content and form, Cocteau builds on the motifs from his first film (The Blood of a Poet) and draws the viewer into an artfully crafted labyrinth of poetic symbols, mythological allusions and ironic jabs at the situation of the modern artist. The astonishing cinematographic tricks, some of which arose from the playful use of technology and coincidence, have retained their charm over the decades.”

Reclam's Film Guide states: “Cocteau plays with myths and images in a fascinating way. He creates a world of penumbra, of puzzles, in which mirrors become doors to the afterlife, and black-uniformed motorcyclists become messengers of death. The decidedly everyday, realistic images become a vehicle for mysterious allusions: Death has the same face as love, and the poet is Death's favorite. The unreal invades reality -- death wanders the streets of Paris; and the afterlife, with its ritual of interrogations and negotiations, appears emphatically this-worldly. Cocteau achieved this state of suspension of reality using entirely cinematic means.”

In 2000, critic Roger Ebert added Orpheus to his “Great Movies” list, praising the simple but ingenious special effects: “Seeing Orpheus today is like glimpsing a cinematic realm that has passed completely from the scene. Films are rarely made for purely artistic reasons, experiments are discouraged, and stars as big as Marais are not cast in eccentric remakes of Greek myths. The story in Cocteau's hands becomes unexpectedly complex; we see that it is not simply about love, death and jealousy, but also about how art can seduce the artist away from ordinary human concerns”.

Andrei Tarkovsky considered it a masterpiece and named it one of the 77 greatest works of cinema. Japanese filmmaker Akira Kurosawa also cited Orpheus as one of his 100 favorite films.

The Morandini Dictionary gives it a poor rating; calling it a “bizarre, artificial film, acted with execrable theatricality and terribly dated”.

An image from the film of Jean Marais reflected in a pool of water was used on the record sleeve for The Smiths' "This Charming Man".

On review aggregator website Rotten Tomatoes, the film holds an approval rating of 88% based on 8 reviews, with an average rating of 7.3/10.

== Opera adaptation ==
In 1993, Philip Glass adapted the film as a stage opera, Orphée, with a libretto by the composer taken directly from Cocteau's screenplay. Jointly commissioned by the American Repertory Theater and the Brooklyn Academy of Music, the work had its premiere on May 14, 1993, at the American Repertory Theater. Francesca Zambello directed the premiere, and the production, closely based on the imagery of the film, was by frequent Glass collaborator Robert Israel. Baritone Eugene Perry originated the role of Orphée, with Wendy Hill as the Princess, Richard Fracker as Heurtebise, and Elizabeth Futral as Eurydice.

In 2007, the opera was revived at Glimmerglass conducted by Anne Manson; Manson also conducted a recording with the Portland Opera in 2010.

== Awards and honors ==
- International Critics' (FIPRESCI) Award and nomination for the Golden Lion at the 1950 Venice Film Festival
- Nomination for Best Film of Any Source at the 1951 BAFTA Awards

== See also ==
- List of avant-garde films of the 1950s
- List of cult films
