= Les Chevaliers de la Table ronde (Cocteau) =

Les Chevaliers de la Table ronde (The Knights of the Round Table) is a 1937 play by the French dramatist Jean Cocteau. In it, Merlin is an old and cruel enchanter who manipulates the court of Arthur with the help of a demon.

The Paris premiere took place on 14 October 1937 at the Théâtre de l'Œuvre, with Michel Vitold as Merlin.

The play was translated into English by W. H. Auden as The Knights of the Round Table and published in the 1963 collection The Infernal Machine and Other Plays. The Auden translation, which included alternate passages for radio, was broadcast on the BBC Third Programme on 24 May 1951, with repeats on 3 July the same year and on 19 April 1953.

The UK stage premiere, in the Auden translation, was at Salisbury Playhouse on 3 May 1954, with Ernest Milton as Merlin.
