= Opium: Diary of a Cure =

1930 journal by Jean Cocteau

- 1957 edition
- Author: Jean Cocteau
- Genre: Memoir
- Publication date: 1930

Opium: Diary of a Cure (French: Opium: Journal d'une désintoxication) is a 1930 journal by the French artist and writer Jean Cocteau, illustrated by the author. The book describes Cocteau's recovery from addiction to opium.

At the end of 1928, Jean Cocteau returned to the clinic in Saint-Cloud to undergo detoxification treatment. He also kept a journal there in which he wrote and drew, and he recounts the experience of his recovery from opium addiction. His account, which includes vivid pen-and-ink illustrations, alternates between his moment-to-moment experiences of drug withdrawal and his current thoughts about people and events in his world. This journal was published in 1930 as Opium: Journal d'une désintoxication. Cocteau's major work, his novel Les Enfants terribles, emerged from these years in treatment.

It was by reading Opium in 1937 that Cocteau's lover, the actor Jean Marais, better understood Cocteau's addiction and vowed to help him overcome it.

Opium contains the first occurrence in French literature of an allusion to the sculptor Alberto Giacometti.
