= Jean Cocteau =

French writer and film director (1889–1963)

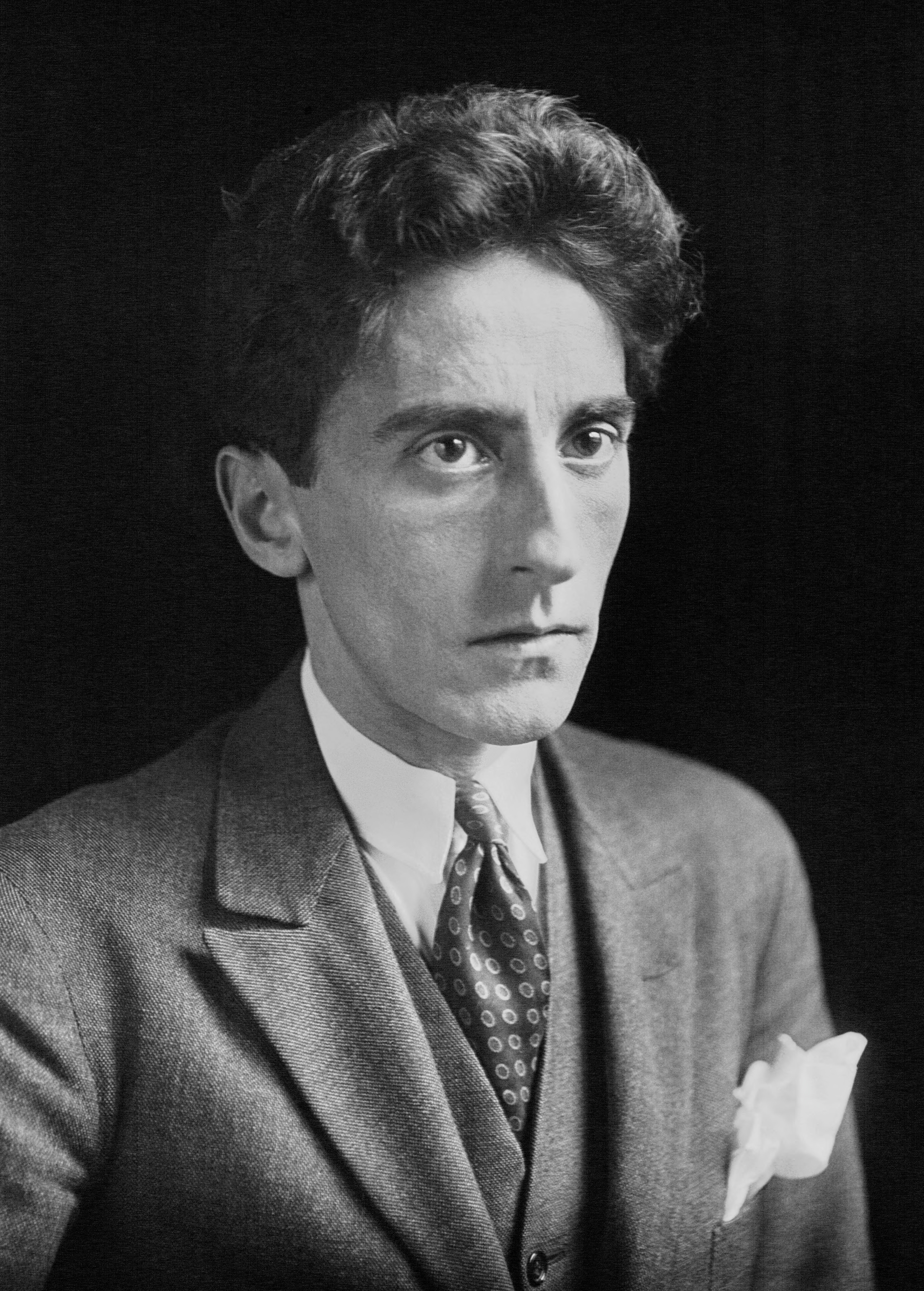
- Cocteau in 1923
- Born: Jean Maurice Eugène Clément Cocteau; 5 July 1889; Maisons-Laffitte, France
- Died: 11 October 1963 (aged 74); Milly-la-Forêt, France
- Other name: The Frivolous Prince
- Occupations: Poet; playwright; screenwriter; novelist; designer; film director; visual artist; critic
- Years active: 1908–1963
- Partners: Raymond Radiguet (1919–1923); Panama Al Brown (1936–1940); Jean Bourgoint (1920–1925); Jean Desbordes (1926–1933); Marcel Khill (1933–1937); Jean Marais (1937–1947); Édouard Dermit (1947–1963)
- Website: jeancocteau.net at the Wayback Machine (archived 2023-04-04)

Jean Maurice Eugène Clément Cocteau (UK: /ˈkɒktoʊ/ KOK-toh, US: /kɒkˈtoʊ/ kok-TOH; French: [ʒɑ̃ mɔʁis øʒɛn klemɑ̃ kɔkto]; 5 July 1889 – 11 October 1963) was a French poet, playwright, screenwriter, novelist, designer, film director, visual artist and critic. He was one of the foremost avant-garde artists of the 20th century and highly influential on the Surrealist and Dadaist movements, among others. The National Observer suggested that "of the artistic generation whose daring gave birth to Twentieth Century Art, Cocteau came closest to being a Renaissance man".

He is most notable for his novels Le Grand Écart (1923), Le Livre blanc (1928), and Les Enfants Terribles (1929); the stage plays La Voix Humaine (1930), La Machine Infernale (1934), Les Parents terribles (1938), La Machine à écrire (1941), and L'Aigle à deux têtes (1946); and the films The Blood of a Poet (1930), Les Parents Terribles (1948), Beauty and the Beast (1946), Orpheus (1950), and Testament of Orpheus (1960), which alongside Blood of a Poet and Orpheus constitute the so-called Orphic Trilogy. He was described as "one of [the] avant-garde's most successful and influential filmmakers" by AllMovie. Cocteau, according to Annette Insdorf, "left behind a body of work unequalled for its variety of artistic expression".

Though his body of work encompassed many different media, Cocteau insisted on calling himself a poet, classifying the great variety of his works — poems, novels, plays, essays, drawings, films — as poésie, poésie de roman, poésie de thêatre, poésie critique, poésie graphique and poésie cinématographique.

== Biography ==
=== Early life ===
Cocteau was born in Maisons-Laffitte, Yvelines, to Georges Cocteau and Eugénie Lecomte, a socially prominent Parisian family. His father, a lawyer and amateur painter, died by suicide when Cocteau was nine. From 1900 to 1904, Cocteau attended the Lycée Condorcet where he met and began a relationship with schoolmate Pierre Dargelos, who reappeared throughout Cocteau's work "John Cocteau: Erotic Drawings".

He left home at fifteen. He published his first volume of poems, Aladdin's Lamp, at nineteen. Cocteau soon became known in Bohemian artistic circles as The Frivolous Prince, the title of a volume he published at twenty-two. Edith Wharton described him as a man "to whom every great line of poetry was a sunrise, every sunset the foundation of the Heavenly City..."

=== Early career ===
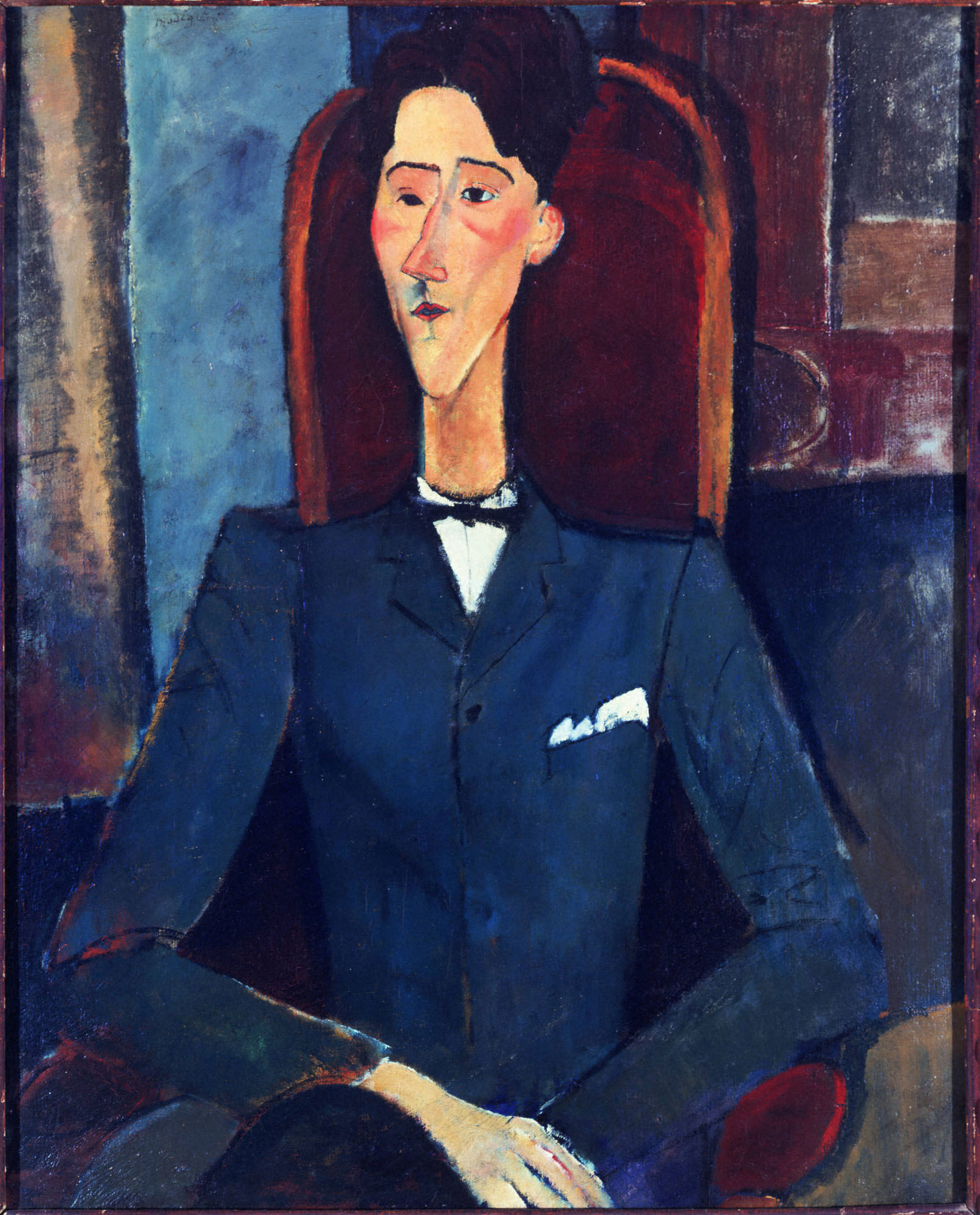
Amedeo Modigliani, Jean Cocteau, 1916, Henry and Rose Pearlman Collection, on long-term loan to the Princeton University Art Museum

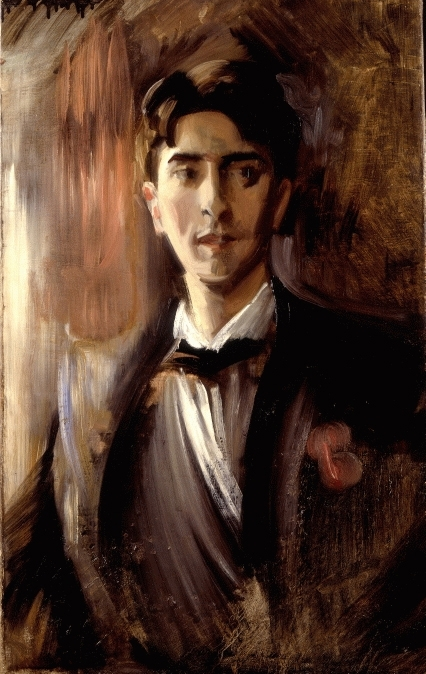
A portrait of Cocteau by Federico de Madrazo y Ochoa, c. 1910–1912

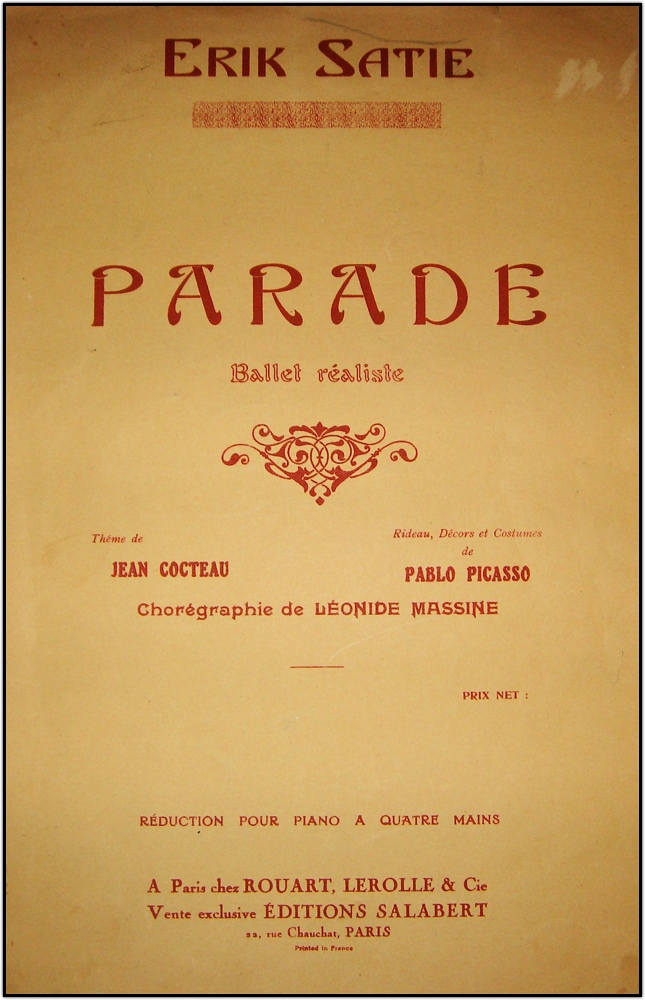
Érik Satie's Parade, ballet on a scenario by Cocteau

In his early twenties, Cocteau became associated with the writers Marcel Proust, André Gide, and Maurice Barrès. In 1912, he collaborated with Léon Bakst on Le Dieu bleu for the Ballets Russes; the principal dancers being Tamara Karsavina and Vaslav Nijinsky. During World War I, Cocteau served in the Red Cross as an ambulance driver. This was the period in which he met the poet Guillaume Apollinaire, artists Pablo Picasso, Amedeo Modigliani and Bernard Buffet, and numerous other writers and artists with whom he later collaborated.

Russian impresario Sergei Diaghilev persuaded Cocteau to write a scenario for a ballet, which resulted in Parade in 1917. It was produced by Diaghilev, with sets by Picasso, the libretto by Apollinaire and the music by Erik Satie. "If it had not been for Apollinaire in uniform," wrote Cocteau, "with his skull shaved, the scar on his temple and the bandage around his head, women would have gouged our eyes out with hairpins."

An important exponent of avant-garde art, Cocteau had great influence on the work of others, including a group of composers known as Les Six. In the early twenties, he and other members of Les Six frequented a wildly popular bar named Le Boeuf sur le Toit, a name that Cocteau himself had a hand in picking. The popularity was due in no small measure to the presence of Cocteau and his friends.

=== Friendship with Raymond Radiguet ===
Marie Laurencin, Portrait de Jean Cocteau, 1921

In 1918, he met the French poet Raymond Radiguet. They collaborated on literary projects, socialized, and traveled together. Cocteau also assisted in obtaining Radiguet's exemption from military service. Admiring of Radiguet's great literary talent, Cocteau promoted his friend's works in his artistic circle and arranged for the publication by Grasset of Le Diable au corps, a largely autobiographical story of an adulterous relationship between a married woman and a younger man, exerting his influence to have the novel awarded the "Nouveau Monde" literary prize. Some contemporaries and later commentators thought there might have been a romantic component to their friendship. Cocteau himself was aware of this perception, and worked earnestly to dispel the notion that their relationship was sexual in nature.

There is disagreement over Cocteau's reaction to Radiguet's sudden death in 1923, with some claiming that it left him stunned, despondent and prey to opium addiction. Opponents of that interpretation point out that he did not attend the funeral (he generally did not attend funerals) and immediately left Paris with Diaghilev for a performance of Les noces (The Wedding) by the Ballets Russes at Monte Carlo.

His opium addiction at the time, Cocteau said, was only coincidental, due to a chance meeting with Louis Laloy, the administrator of the Monte Carlo Opera. Cocteau's opium use and his efforts to stop profoundly changed his literary style. His most notable book, Les Enfants Terribles, was written in a week during a strenuous opium weaning.

In Opium: Diary of a Cure, he recounts the experience of his recovery from opium addiction in 1929. His account, which includes vivid pen-and-ink illustrations, alternates between his moment-to-moment experiences of drug withdrawal and his current thoughts about people and events in his world. Cocteau was supported throughout his recovery by his friend and correspondent, Catholic philosopher Jacques Maritain. Under Maritain's influence, Cocteau made a temporary return to the sacraments of the Catholic Church. With Maritain, he founded the literary magazine Le Roseau d'Or. He again returned to the Church later in life and undertook a number of religious art projects.

=== Further works ===
On 15 June 1926 Cocteau's play Orphée was staged in Paris. It was quickly followed by an exhibition of drawings and "constructions" called Poésie plastique–objets, dessins. Cocteau wrote the libretto for Igor Stravinsky's opera-oratorio Oedipus rex, which had its original performance in the Théâtre Sarah Bernhardt in Paris on 30 May 1927. In 1929 one of his most celebrated works, the novel Les Enfants terribles was published.

In 1930 Cocteau made his first film The Blood of a Poet, publicly shown in 1932. Though now generally accepted as a surrealist film, the surrealists themselves did not accept it as a truly surrealist work. Although this is one of Cocteau's best-known works, his 1930s are notable rather for a number of stage plays, above all La Voix humaine and Les Parents terribles, which was a popular success. His 1934 play La Machine infernale was Cocteau's stage version of the Oedipus legend and is considered to be his greatest work for the theatre. During this period Cocteau also published two volumes of journalism, including Mon Premier Voyage: Tour du Monde en 80 jours, a neo-Jules Verne around the world travel reportage he made for the newspaper Paris-Soir.

From the 1920s Cocteau began to illustrate his own literary works, developing an economical use of line to create figurative form from minimal strokes. An illustrated edition of his novel Thomas l’imposteur was published in 1927, followed by Opium and Le Livre blanc in 1930. In 1935, Cocteau's 60 illustrations for his 1929 novel Les Enfants terribles were published as a portfolio edition. Cocteau's visual language also became integral to his cinema, beginning with Le Sang d’un poète in 1932 and continuing through later works including his 1946 film La Belle et la Bête and Orphée in 1950.

=== 1940–1944 ===
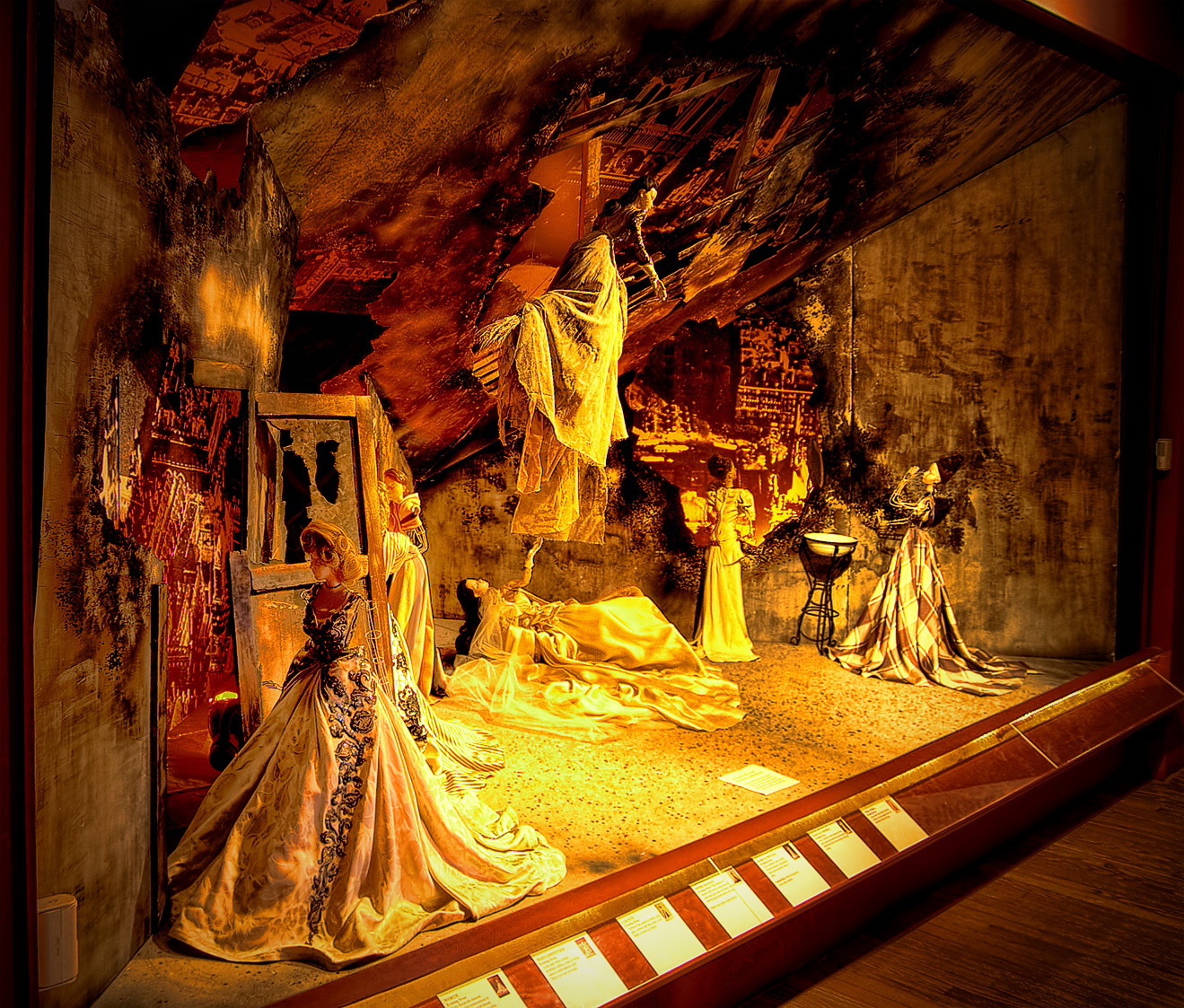
Tribute to René Clair: I Married a Witch, Cocteau's 1945 set design for the Théâtre de la Mode

Throughout his life, Cocteau tried to maintain a distance from political movements, confessing to a friend that "my politics are non-existent". According to Claude Arnaud, from the 1920s on, Cocteau's only deeply held political convictions were a marked pacifism and antiracism. He praised the French republic for serving as a haven for the persecuted, and applauded Picasso's anti-war painting Guernica as a cross that "Franco would always carry on his shoulder". In 1940, Cocteau signed a petition circulated by the Ligue internationale contre l'antisémitisme (International League Against Antisemitism) which protested the rise of racism and antisemitism in France, and declared himself "ashamed of his white skin" after witnessing the plight of colonized peoples during his travels.

Although in 1938 Cocteau had compared Adolf Hitler to an evil demiurge who wished to perpetrate a Saint Bartholomew's Day massacre against Jews, his friend Arno Breker convinced him that Hitler was a pacifist and patron of the arts with France's best interests in mind. During the Nazi occupation of France, he was in a "round-table" of French and German intellectuals who met at the Georges V Hotel in Paris, including Cocteau, the writers Ernst Jünger, Paul Morand and Henry Millon de Montherlant, the publisher Gaston Gallimard and the Nazi legal scholar Carl Schmitt.

In his diary, Cocteau accused France of disrespect towards Hitler and speculated on the Führer's sexuality. Cocteau effusively praised Breker's sculptures in an article entitled Salut à Breker published in 1942. This piece caused him to be arraigned on charges of collaboration after the war, though he was cleared of any wrongdoing and had used his contacts for his failed attempt to save friends such as Max Jacob. Later, after growing closer with communists such as Louis Aragon, Cocteau would name Joseph Stalin as "the only great politician of the era".

In 1940, Le Bel Indifférent, Cocteau's play written for and starring Édith Piaf (who died the day before Cocteau), was enormously successful.

=== Later years ===
Cocteau's later years are mostly associated with his films. Cocteau's films, most of which he both wrote and directed, were particularly important in introducing the avant-garde into French cinema and influenced to a certain degree the upcoming French New Wave genre.

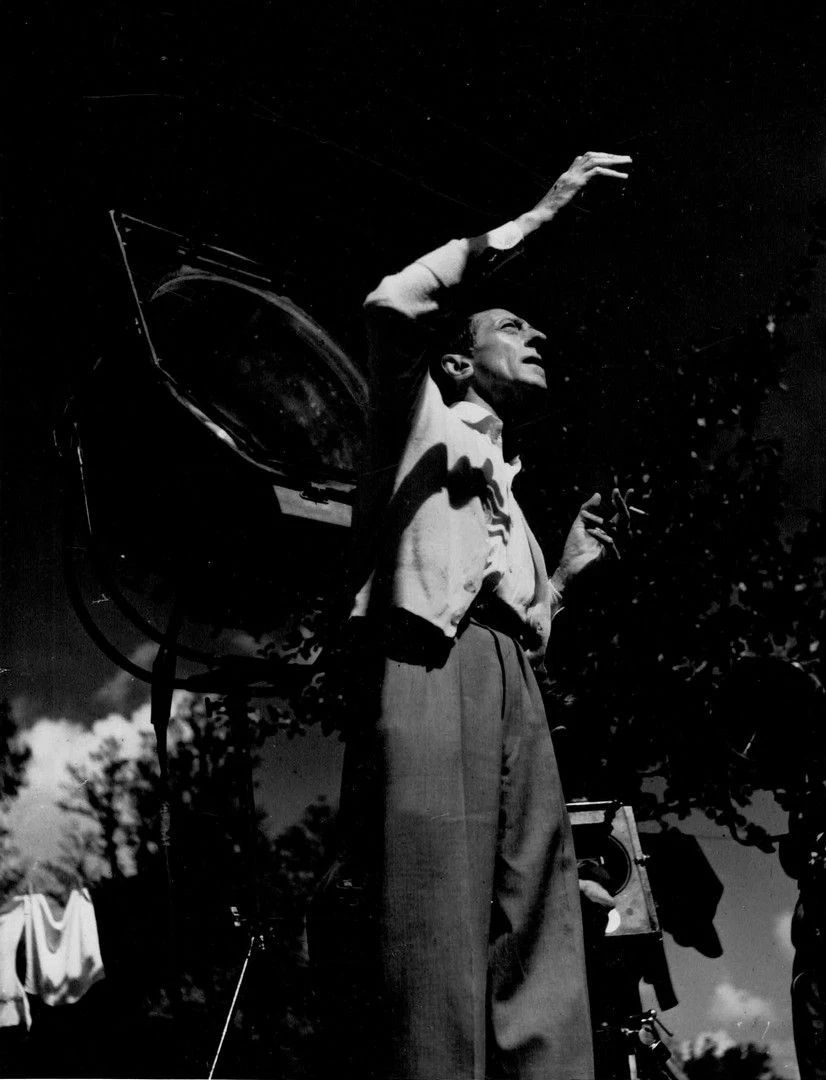
Cocteau directing Beauty and the Beast (1946)

Following The Blood of a Poet (1930), his best known films include Beauty and the Beast (1946), Les Parents terribles (1948), and Orpheus (1949). His final film, Le Testament d'Orphée (The Testament of Orpheus) (1960), featured appearances by Picasso and matador Luis Miguel Dominguín, along with Yul Brynner, who also helped to finance the film.

In 1945, Cocteau was one of several designers who created sets for the Théâtre de la Mode. He drew inspiration from filmmaker René Clair while making Tribute to René Clair: I Married a Witch. The maquette is described in his "Journal 1942–1945", in his entry for 12 February 1945:

I saw the model of my set. Fashion bores me, but I am amused by the set and fashion placed together. It is a smoldering maid's room. One discovers an aerial view of Paris through the wall and ceiling holes. It creates vertigo. On the iron bed lies a fainted bride. Behind her stand several dismayed ladies. On the right, a very elegant lady washes her hands in a flophouse basin. Through the unhinged door on the left, a lady enters with raised arms. Others are pushed against the walls. The vision provoking this catastrophe is a bride-witch astride a broom, flying through the ceiling, her hair and train streaming.

==== Site-specific artworks ====
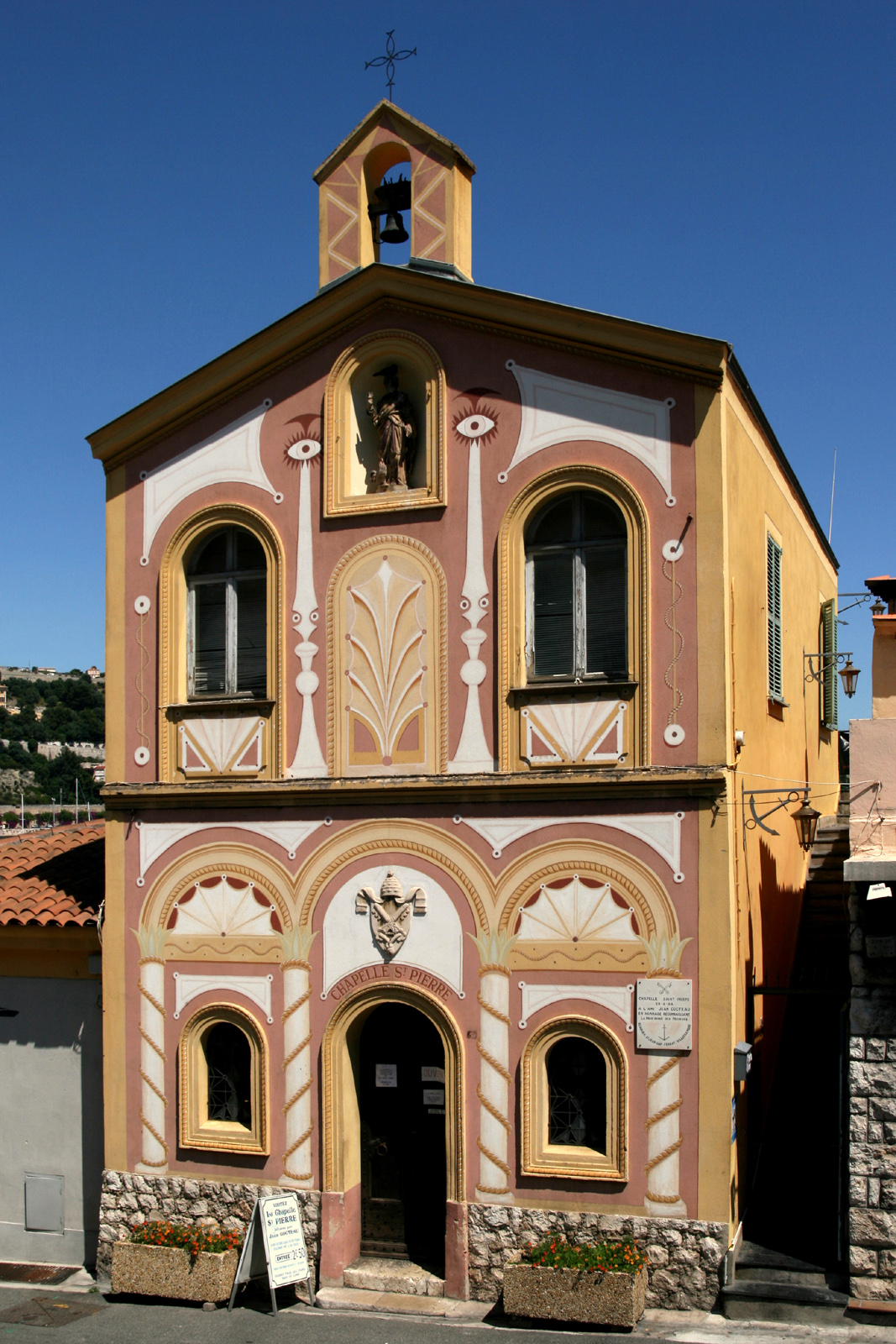
Chapelle Saint-Pierre, Villefranche-sur-Mer

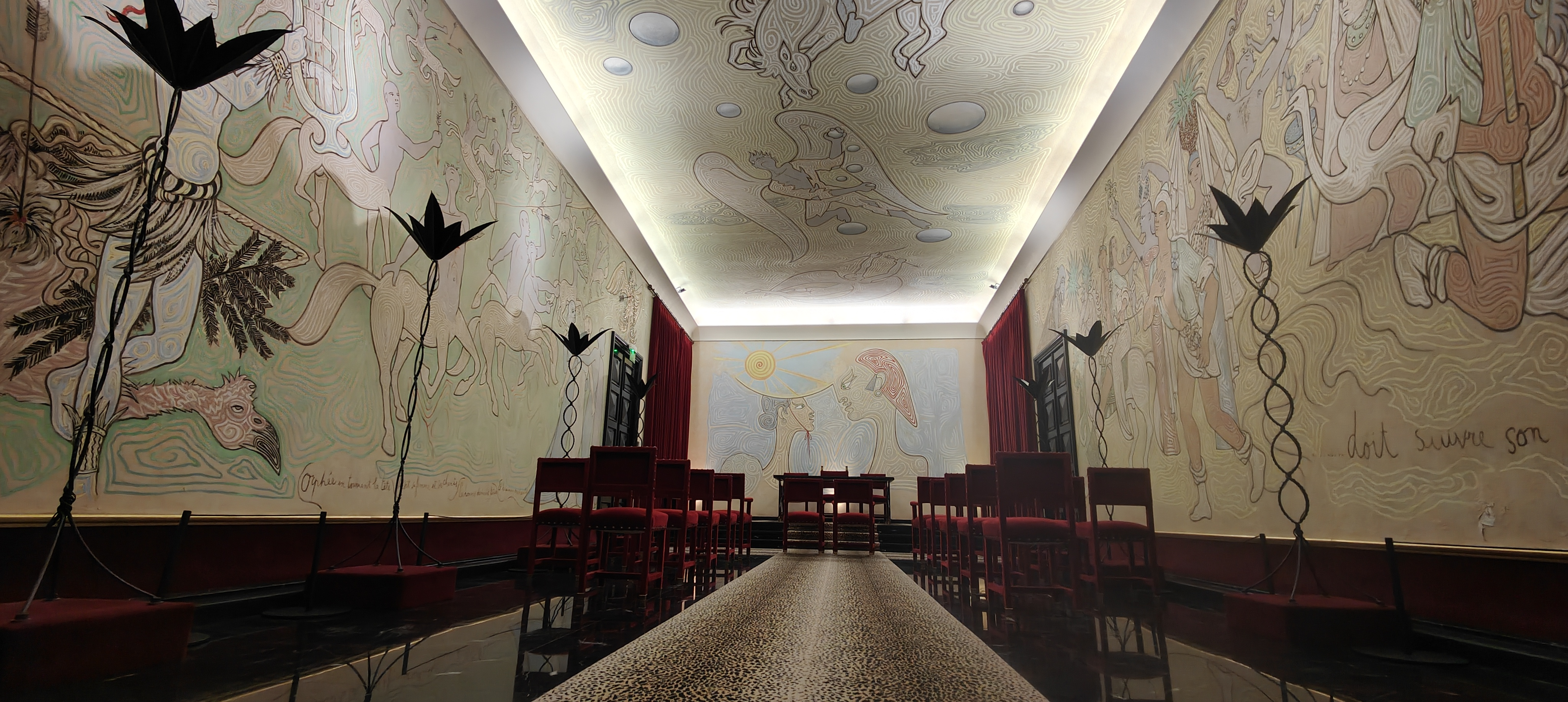
Salle des Mariages, Hôtel de Ville, Menton

From the 1950s, Cocteau undertook a series of site-specific artworks for architectural settings, with the French Riviera a major center of activity. In 1950 he was invited by Francine Weisweiller to decorate the Villa Santo Sospir on Saint-Jean-Cap-Ferrat. In this private domestic setting Cocteau painted the walls, ceilings and doors with murals inspired by Mediterranean life and Greek mythology. He described the result as a “tattooed villa”.

In 1956, at Villefranche-sur-Mer, Cocteau began work on the decoration of the sixteenth-century Chapelle Saint-Pierre, painting its entire interior with scenes from the life of Saint Peter and references to Mediterranean life and fishing. Completed in 1957, he decorated the façade with orange and ochre trompe-l’œil columns and arches.

Between 1956 and 1958, Cocteau decorated the Salle des Mariages of the Hôtel de Ville in Menton, completing a colourful mural cycle depicting, among other subjects, an elaborate wedding procession. In 1957, the mayor of Menton, Francis Palmero, invited Cocteau to transform the Bastion, an abandoned seventeenth-century fort on the town's harbour wall, into a museum for his work. Cocteau designed pebble mosaics for the building and selected works for display. The museum opened in 1966, three years after his death, with Cocteau's adopted son Édouard Dermit faithfully completing the project.

Between 1958 and 1962, Cocteau designed and oversaw the construction of an open-air theatre for the Centre Méditerranéen at Cap-d'Ail.

Chapelle Saint-Blaise des Simples, Milly-la-Forêt

In 1959, spurred by the success of the chapel at Villefranche-sur-Mer, the town council of Milly-la-Forêt - where Cocteau had lived since 1947 - invited him to decorate the Chapelle Saint-Blaise des Simples. The sole remnant of a 12th-century leper hospital, the small chapel was then in the process of restoration. Cocteau took inspiration from the medicinal plants associated with the town for his mural and stained glass designs, alongside imagery of the Resurrection. Inaugurated in 1960, Cocteau was buried here in accordance with his wishes following his death in 1963.

Cocteau was also responsible for three other late-career works for religious settings. In 1959 he was invited by René Varin, the French cultural adviser in London, to decorate the Lady Chapel of the Church of Notre Dame de France in Leicester Square. His murals of the Annunciation, Crucifixion and Assumption were painted in situ over a period of just eight days in November of that year. It is Cocteau's only site-specific work outside of France.

In 1962, Cocteau designed a cycle of 24 figurative, geometric and abstract stained-glass windows for the Église Saint-Maximin in Metz. They were posthumously realized in glass between 1967 and 1970 by glassmakers Emile and Michel Brière, working with Cocteau's longtime collaborator Raymond Moretti.

Cocteau's final site-specific commission was the decorative scheme for the Chapelle Notre-Dame-de-Jérusalem at Fréjus. Construction on the chapel began in February 1963, but Cocteau died in October before any decoration was undertaken. Dermit faithfully executed the interior murals according to Cocteau's designs centered on the Passion of Christ, which he completed in 1965, while Cocteau's designs for the stained glass doors were again bought to fruition by Moretti. In 1992 six mosaics by Lætitia Léotard and Henry Virmouneix were installed on the exterior arcade in accordance with Cocteau's intended plan.

=== Private life ===
Jean Cocteau never hid his homosexuality. He was the author of the mildly homoerotic and semi-autobiographical Le Livre blanc (translated as The White Paper or The White Book), published anonymously in 1928. He never repudiated its authorship and a later edition of the novel features his foreword and drawings. The novel begins:

As far back as I can remember, and even at an age when the mind does not yet influence the senses, I find traces of my love of boys. I have always loved the strong sex that I find legitimate to call the fair sex. My misfortunes came from a society that condemns the rare as a crime and forces us to reform our inclinations.

Frequently his work, either literary (Les enfants terribles), graphic (erotic drawings, book illustration, paintings) or cinematographic (The Blood of a Poet, Orpheus, Beauty and the Beast), is pervaded with homosexual undertones, homoerotic imagery/symbolism or camp. In 1947 Paul Morihien published a clandestine edition of Querelle de Brest by Jean Genet, featuring 29 very explicit erotic drawings by Cocteau. In recent years several albums of Cocteau's homoerotica have been available to the general public.

In the 1930s, Cocteau is rumoured to have had a platonic affair with Princess Natalie Paley, the daughter of a Romanov Grand Duke and herself a sometime actress, model, and former wife of couturier Lucien Lelong.

Cocteau's longest-lasting relationships were with French actors Jean Marais and Édouard Dermit, whom Cocteau formally adopted. Cocteau cast Marais in The Eternal Return (1943), Beauty and the Beast (1946), Ruy Blas (1947), and Orpheus (1949).

Liane de Pougy (1869–1950)'s diaries from 1919 to 1941, published as Mes cahiers bleus in French in 1977, and My Blue Notebooks in English in 1979, describe Cocteau.

=== Death ===
Cocteau died of a heart attack at his château in Milly-la-Forêt, Essonne, France, on 11 October 1963 at the age of 74. His friend, French singer Édith Piaf, had died the previous day. Her death was announced on the morning of Cocteau's day of death. It has been said, in a story which is almost certainly apocryphal, that his heart failed upon hearing of Piaf's death.

Cocteau's health had already been in decline for several months, and he had previously had a severe heart attack on 22 April 1963. A more plausible suggestion for the reason behind this decline in health has been proposed by author Roger Peyrefitte, who notes that Cocteau had been devastated by a breach with his longtime friend, socialite and notable patron Francine Weisweiller, as a result of an affair she had been having with a minor writer. Weisweiller and Cocteau did not reconcile until shortly before Cocteau's death.

According to his wishes, Cocteau is buried beneath the floor of the Chapelle Saint-Blaise des Simples in Milly-la-Forêt. The epitaph on his gravestone set in the floor of the chapel reads: "I stay with you" (French: Je reste avec vous).

== Honours and awards ==
In 1955, Cocteau was made a member of the Académie Française and The Royal Academy of Belgium.

During his life, Cocteau was commander of the Legion of Honor, Member of the Mallarmé Academy, German Academy (Berlin), American Academy, Mark Twain (U.S.A) Academy, Honorary President of the Cannes Film Festival, Honorary President of the France-Hungary Association and President of the Jazz Academy and the Academy of the Disc.

== Influence ==
Film critic Pauline Kael mentions that revivals of the film Blood of a Poet led to Cocteau being considered one of the most important filmmakers of his time, because he was "an artist using the medium for his own end." She said that he caused audiences to start looking at films in a new way, as invited filmmakers and no longer as merely audience members. Cocteau has influenced the practices of several contemporary artists including Andy Warhol, David Hockney, Amadour, Sutapa Biswas, and Félix González-Torres. He is also cited as an influence on filmmakers including David Lynch, Kenneth Anger, Alejandro Jodorowsky, Jean-Luc Godard, Jacques Rivette, Pedro Almodóvar, and Derek Jarman.

== Legacy ==
=== Museum ===
The scale of Cocteau's visual output is reflected in the collection assembled by the Belgian art collector Séverin Wunderman. Wunderman donated his collection of almost 1,000 works by the artist to the town of Menton in 2005, and the Musée Jean Cocteau—collection Séverin Wunderman, housed in a building designed by Rudy Ricciotti, opened there in 2011.

== Works ==
=== Literature ===
==== Poetry ====
Le combattant by Cocteau, c. 1940, ink and ink wash on paper, 26.5 x 21 cm. Private collection

- 1909: La Lampe d'Aladin
- 1910: Le Prince frivole
- 1912: La Danse de Sophocle
- 1919: Ode à Picasso – Le Cap de Bonne-Espérance
- 1920: Escale. Poésies (1917–1920)
- 1922: Vocabulaire
- 1923: La Rose de François – Plain-Chant
- 1925: Cri écrit
- 1926: L'Ange Heurtebise
- 1927: Opéra
- 1934: Mythologie
- 1939: Énigmes
- 1941: Allégories
- 1945: Léone
- 1946: La Crucifixion
- 1948: Poèmes
- 1952: Le Chiffre sept – La Nappe du Catalan (in collaboration with Georges Hugnet)
- 1953: Dentelles d'éternité – Appoggiatures
- 1954: Clair-obscur
- 1958: Paraprosodies
- 1961: Cérémonial espagnol du Phénix – La Partie d'échecs
- 1962: Le Requiem
- 1968: Faire-Part (posthume)

==== Novels ====
- 1919: Le Potomak (definitive edition: 1924)
- 1923: Le Grand Écart and Thomas l'imposteur
- 1928: Le Livre blanc
- 1929: Les Enfants terribles
- 1940: La Fin du Potomak

==== Theatre ====
- 1917: Parade, ballet (music by Erik Satie, choreography by Léonide Massine)
- 1921: Les mariés de la tour Eiffel, ballet (music by Georges Auric, Arthur Honegger, Darius Milhaud, Francis Poulenc and Germaine Tailleferre)
- 1922: Antigone
- 1924: Roméo et Juliette
- 1925: Orphée
- 1927: Oedipus Rex, opera-oratorio (music by Igor Stravinsky)
- 1930: La Voix humaine
- 1934: La Machine infernale
- 1936: L'École des veuves
- 1937: Œdipe-roi. Les Chevaliers de la Table ronde, premiere at the Théâtre Antoine
- 1938: Les Parents terribles, premiere at the Théâtre Antoine
- 1940: Le bel indifférent
- 1940: Les Monstres sacrés
- 1941: La Machine à écrire
- 1943: Renaud et Armide. L'Épouse injustement soupçonnée
- 1944: L'Aigle à deux têtes
- 1946: Le Jeune Homme et la Mort, ballet by Roland Petit
- 1948: Théâtre I and II
- 1951: Bacchus
- 1960: Nouveau théâtre de poche
- 1962: L'Impromptu du Palais-Royal
- 1971: Le Gendarme incompris (in collaboration with Raymond Radiguet and Francis Poulenc)

==== Poetry and criticism ====
- 1918: Le Coq et l'Arlequin
- 1920: Carte blanche
- 1922: Le Secret professionnel
- 1926: Le Rappel à l'ordre – Lettre à Jacques Maritain – Le Numéro Barbette
- 1930: Opium
- 1932: Essai de critique indirecte
- 1935: Portraits-Souvenir
- 1937: Mon premier voyage (Around the World in 80 Days)
- 1943: Le Greco
- 1946: La Mort et les Statues (photos by Pierre Jahan)
- 1947: Le Foyer des artistes – La Difficulté d'être
- 1949: Lettres aux Américains – Reines de la France
- 1951: Jean Marais – A Discussion about Cinematography (with André Fraigneau)
- 1952: Gide vivant
- 1953: Journal d'un inconnu. Démarche d'un poète
- 1955: Colette (Discourse on the reception at the Royal Academy of Belgium) – Discourse on the reception at the Académie Française
- 1956: Discours d'Oxford
- 1957: Entretiens sur le musée de Dresde (with Louis Aragon) – La Corrida du 1er mai
- 1950: Poésie critique I
- 1960: Poésie critique II
- 1962: Le Cordon ombilical
- 1963: La Comtesse de Noailles, oui et non
- 1964: Portraits-Souvenir (posthumous; A discussion with Roger Stéphane)
- 1965: Entretiens avec André Fraigneau (posthumous)
- 1973: Jean Cocteau par Jean Cocteau: Entretiens avec William Fifield (posthumous; a conversation in French with William Fifield)
- 1973: Du cinématographe (posthumous). Entretiens sur le cinématographe (posthumous)
- 1974: Jean Cocteau (posthumous; monograph by William Fifield in the Columbia Essays on Modern Writers series, Number 70)
- 2003: Jean Cocteau: 28 autoportraits, écrits et dessinés, textes et entretiens (1928-1963) (posthumous)
- 2013: Jean Cocteau secondo Jean Cocteau (posthumous; Italian translation of Jean Cocteau par Jean Cocteau: Entretiens avec William Fifield)

==== Journalistic poetry ====
- 1935–1938 (posthumous)

=== Film ===
==== Director ====
- 1925: Jean Cocteau fait du cinéma lost
- 1932: Le Sang d'un poète
- 1946: La Belle et la Bête
- 1948: L'Aigle à deux têtes
- 1948: Les Parents terribles
- 1950: Orphée
- 1950: Coriolan unreleased home movie
- 1952: La Villa Santo-Sospir
- 1955: L'Amour sous l'électrode
- 1957: 8 × 8: A Chess Sonata in 8 Movements
- 1960: Le Testament d'Orphée

==== Scriptwriter ====
- 1943: L'Éternel Retour directed by Jean Delannoy
- 1944: Les Dames du Bois de Boulogne directed by Robert Bresson
- 1948: Ruy Blas directed by Pierre Billon
- 1950: Les Enfants terribles directed by Jean-Pierre Melville, script by Jean Cocteau based on his novel
- 1951: La Couronne Noire directed by Luis Saslavsky
- 1961: La Princesse de Clèves directed by Jean Delannoy
- 1965: Thomas l'imposteur directed by Georges Franju, script by Jean Cocteau based on his novel

==== Dialogue writer ====
- 1943: Le Baron fantôme (+ actor) directed by Serge de Poligny
- 1961: La Princesse de Clèves directed by Jean Delannoy
- 1965: Thomas l'imposteur directed by Georges Franju

==== Director of Photography ====
- 1950: Un chant d'amour réalisé par Jean Genet

=== Artworks ===
- 1924: Dessins
- 1925: Le Mystère de Jean l'oiseleur
- 1926: Maison de santé
- 1929: 25 dessins d'un dormeur
- 1935: 60 designs for Les Enfants Terribles
- 1940: Le combattant
- 1941: Drawings in the margins of Chevaliers de la Table ronde
- 1948: Drôle de ménage
- 1958: La Chapelle Saint-Pierre (lithographies)
- 1958: Un Arlequin (The Harlequin)
- 1959: Gondol des morts

==== Artworks for architectural settings ====
- 1950: Mural paintings for La Villa Santo-Sospir, Saint-Jean-Cap-Ferrat
- 1956-1957: Mural paintings and stained glass designs for La Chapelle Saint-Pierre, Villefranche-sur-Mer
- 1957-1958: Mural paintings for La Salle des mariages, Hôtel de Ville, Menton
- 1958-1962: Open-air theatre for the Centre Méditerranéen, Cap-d'Ail
- 1958-1963: Pebble mosaics, Bastion Museum, Menton
- 1959: Mural paintings for the Lady Chapel of the Church of Notre Dame de France, London
- 1959-1960: Mural paintings and stained glass designs for Chapelle Saint-Blaise-des-Simples, Milly-la-Forêt
- 1961-1962: Stained glass designs for the Église Saint-Maximin, Metz
- 1962-1963: Mural, stained glass and mosaic designs for the Chapelle Notre-Dame-de-Jérusalem, Fréjus

=== Recordings ===
- Colette par Jean Cocteau, discours de réception à l'Académie Royale de Belgique, Ducretet-Thomson 300 V 078 St.
- Les Mariés de la Tour Eiffel and Portraits-Souvenir, La Voix de l'Auteur LVA 13
- Plain-chant by Jean Marais, extracts from the piece Orphée by Jean-Pierre Aumont, Michel Bouquet, Monique Mélinand, Les Parents terribles by Yvonne de Bray and Jean Marais, L'Aigle à deux têtes par Edwige Feuillère and Jean Marais, L'Encyclopédie Sonore 320 E 874, 1971
- Collection of three vinyl recordings of Jean Cocteau including La Voix humaine by Simone Signoret, 18 songs composed by Louis Bessières, Bee Michelin and Renaud Marx, on double-piano Paul Castanier, Le Discours de réception à l'Académie française, Jacques Canetti JC1, 1984
- Derniers propos à bâtons rompus avec Jean Cocteau, 16 September 1963 à Milly-la-Forêt, Bel Air 311035
- Les Enfants terribles, radio version with Jean Marais, Josette Day, Silvia Monfort and Jean Cocteau, CD Phonurgia Nova ISBN 2-908325-07-1, 1992
- Jean Cocteau: A Self-Portrait, A Conversation with William Fifield in French / Jean Cocteau: Un autoportrait, une conversation avec William Fifield en français, The William Fifield Collection, Times Two Publishing Company. Part of the bilingual Cocteau Series / La série Cocteau, reissued works that include a bilingual French-English transcript of the recording; a full, book-length text of the recording in French originally published by Éditions Stock, Jean Cocteau par Jean Cocteau: Entretiens avec William Fifield; and a monograph in English originally published in the Columbia Essays on Modern Writers series, Columbia University Press, Jean Cocteau.
- Anthology, 4 CD containing numerous poems and texts read by the author, Anna la bonne, La Dame de Monte-Carlo and Mes sœurs, n'aimez pas les marins by Marianne Oswald, Le Bel Indifférent by Edith Piaf, La Voix humaine by Berthe Bovy, Les Mariés de la Tour Eiffel with Jean Le Poulain, Jacques Charon and Jean Cocteau, discourse on the reception at the Académie française, with extracts from Les Parents terribles, La Machine infernale, pieces from Parade on piano with two hands by Georges Auric and Francis Poulenc, Frémeaux & Associés FA 064, 1997
- Poems by Jean Cocteau read by the author, CD EMI 8551082, 1997
- Hommage à Jean Cocteau, mélodies d'Henri Sauguet, Arthur Honegger, Louis Durey, Darius Milhaud, Erik Satie, Jean Wiener, Max Jacob, Francis Poulenc, Maurice Delage, Georges Auric, Guy Sacre, by Jean-François Gardeil (baritone) and Billy Eidi (piano), CD Adda 581177, 1989
- Le Testament d'Orphée, journal sonore, by Roger Pillaudin, 2 CD INA / Radio France 211788, 1998

=== Journals ===
- 1946: La Belle et la Bête (film journal)
- 1949: Maalesh (journal of a stage production)
- 1983: Le Passé défini (posthumous)
- 1989: Journal, 1942–1945

=== Stamps ===
- 1960: Marianne de Cocteau

== See also ==
- Jean Cocteau Museum
- Jean Cocteau Repertory
- List of ambulance drivers during World War I
