= Testament of Orpheus =

- Theatrical release poster
- Directed by: Jean Cocteau
- Written by: Jean Cocteau
- Produced by: Jean Thuillier
- Starring: Jean Cocteau; Édouard Dermit; Henri Crémieux; María Casares; François Périer
- Cinematography: Roland Pontoizeau
- Edited by: Marie-Josephe Yoyotte
- Music by: Georges Auric; George Frideric Handel; Martial Solal
- Distributed by: Cinédis
- Release date: 18 February 1960
- Running time: 80 minutes
- Country: France
- Language: French

Testament of Orpheus (French: Le testament d'Orphée) is a 1960 black-and-white film with a few seconds of color film spliced into it. Directed by and starring Jean Cocteau, who plays himself as an 18th-century poet, the film includes cameo appearances by Pablo Picasso, Jean Marais, Charles Aznavour, Jean-Pierre Leaud, and Yul Brynner. It is considered the final part of The Orphic Trilogy, following The Blood of a Poet (1930) and Orphée (1950).

One critic described it as a "wry, self-conscious re-examination of a lifetime's obsessions" with Cocteau placing himself at the center of the mythological and fictional world he spun throughout his books, films, plays and paintings. The film includes numerous instances of "double takes", including one scene where Cocteau, walking past himself, looks back to see himself in what was described by one scholar as "a retrospective on the Cocteau œuvre".

The New York Times called it "self-serving", noting that the pretension of the film was certainly intended by Cocteau as his last statement made on film: "as much a long-winded self-analysis as an extraordinary succession of visually arresting images".

Picasso had introduced Cocteau to the photographer Lucien Clergue who was brought in to photo-document the film's production. His black-and-white stills were published in 2001 as Jean Cocteau and The Testament of Orpheus.
