= Volvo Venus Bilo =

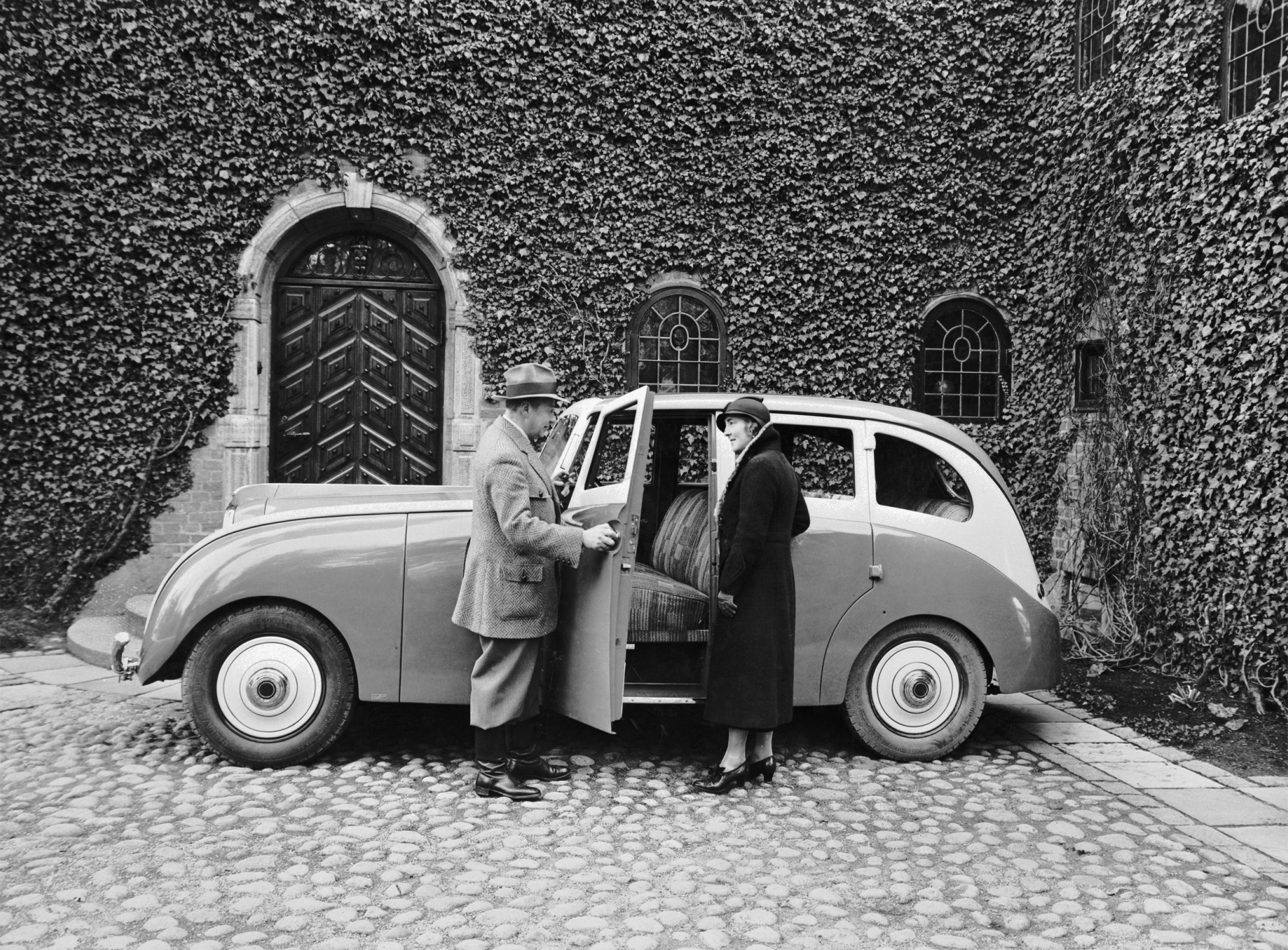

Overview
- Manufacturer: Volvo Cars
- Production: 1933 (Concept car)
- Designer: Gustaf Ericsson

Body and chassis
- Class: Luxury car
- Body style: 4-door saloon
- Layout: Front-engine, rear-wheel-drive
- Related: Volvo PV 36 Carioca

The Volvo Venus Bilo was a concept car unveiled by Volvo Cars in 1933. It was a streamlined design with rear hinged doors and conventional doors in the side to access the engine bay. It was designed to have good loading capacity.

Nine specially designed suitcases could be fitted into spaces in the back and compartments in the right front fender (the left fender contained a spare tyre and tools). A second spare tyre in the rear was used as the bumper. The design was by Gustaf Ericsson, the son of Lars Magnus Ericsson.

The car was based on the chassis of the Volvo PV655, with coachwork by Gustaf Nordbergs Vagnfabrik AB in 1932. The name was a pun referencing the Venus de Milo, with bil meaning “automobile” in Swedish. The concept was a four-door, four-seater saloon and led to the Volvo PV 36 Carioca production car, which was also a four-door saloon.

The fate of the concept car itself is currently unknown. It was sold to a buyer in Denmark after World War II and in the mid-1950s was owned by the son of a scrapyard owner in Denmark, who rebuilt it into a pickup truck. It was used as late as 1956, after which there are no records of it.

== Gallery ==
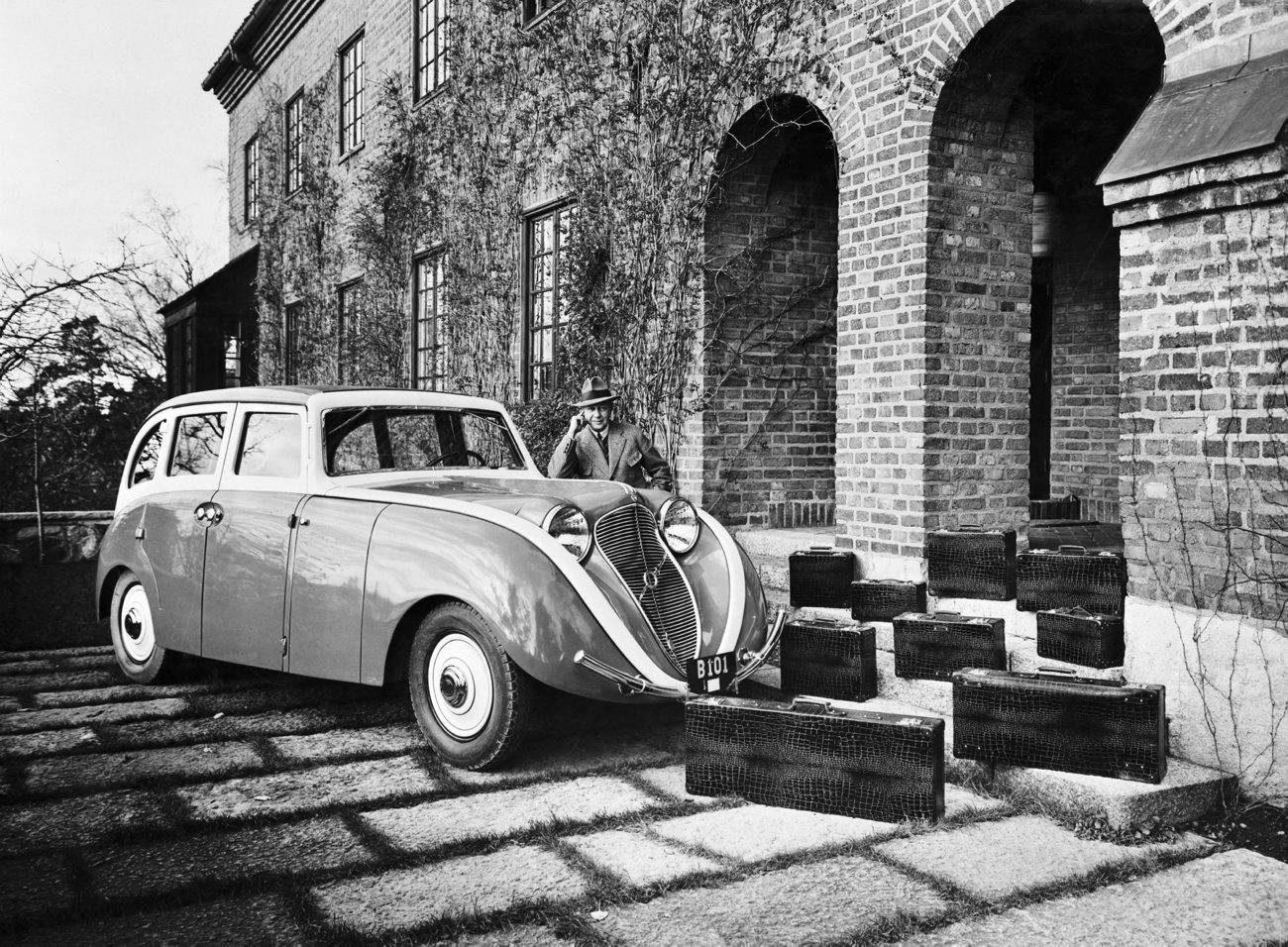
The designer by the side of his prototype car. Picture for the newspaper Idrottsbladet (23 November 1933).

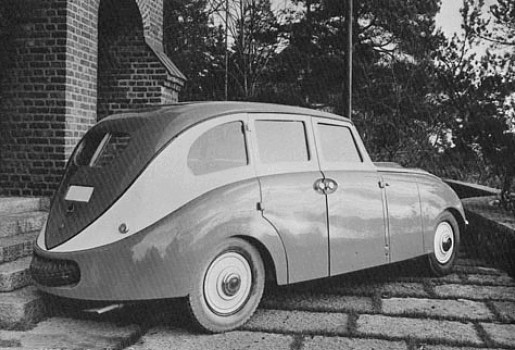
Volvo Venus Bilo rear view

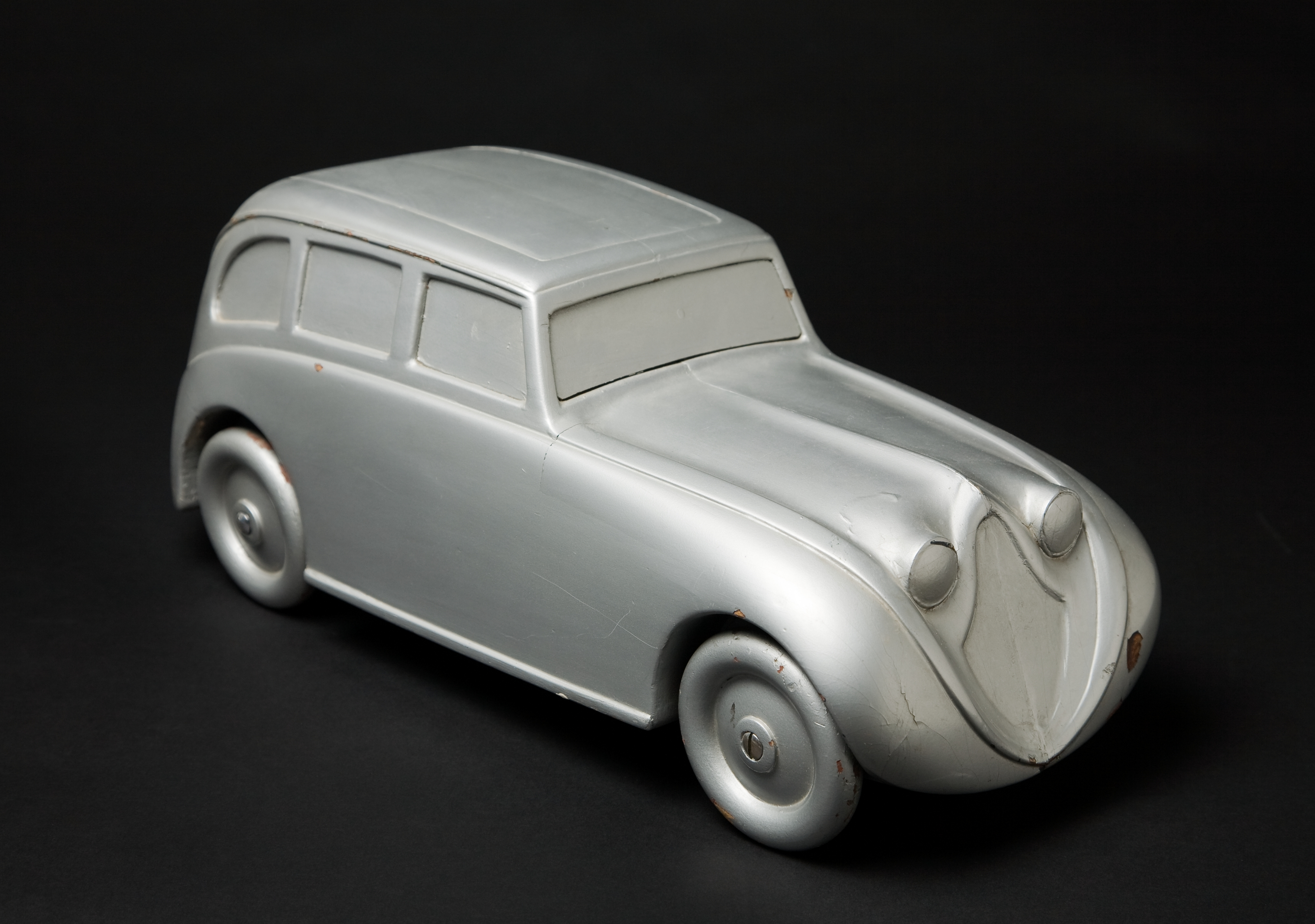
Model of the Venus Bilo made by Gustaf L.M. Ericsson in 1932.
