= Aaroe =

Aaroe, Aaröe, Aarøe is a surname. Notable people with the surname include:

- Alden Aaroe (1918–1993), American broadcast journalist
- Ami Aaröe (1925–2024), Swedish actress
- Peder A. Aarøe (1868–1927), Norwegian trade unionist
