= Christian Beck =

Christian Beck may refer to:

- Christian Beck (poet) (1879–1916), Belgian poet
- Christian Beck (footballer) (born 1988), German footballer
- Christian Daniel Beck (1757–1832), German philologist, historian, theologian and antiquarian

== See also ==
- Christian Bach (disambiguation)
