= Gustaf Ericssons Automobilfabrik =

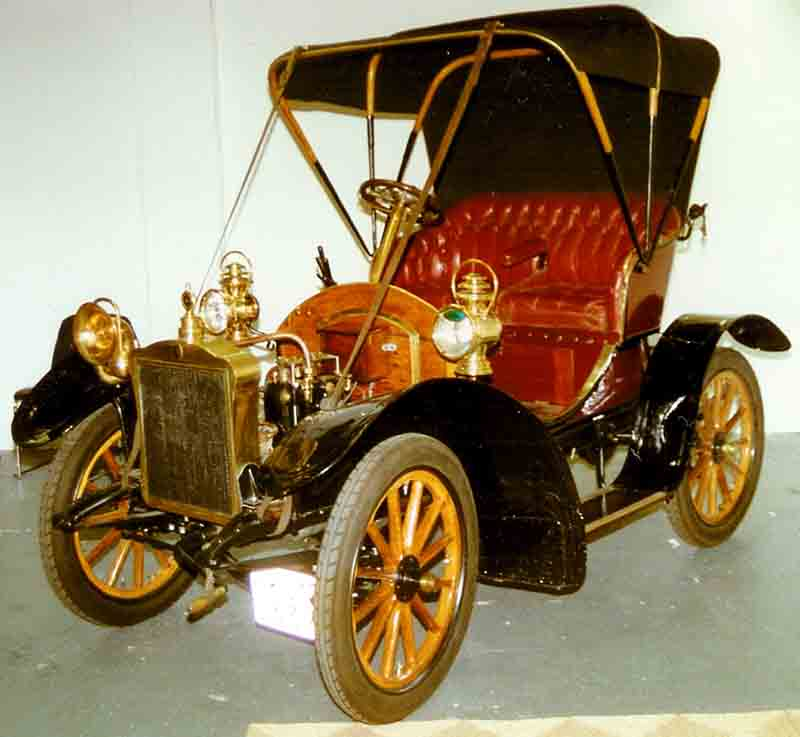
A GEA Gurik from 1907.

GEA (Gustaf Ericssons Automobilfabrik) was a Swedish automobile manufacturer founded by Gustaf Ericsson (son of inventor Lars Magnus Ericsson) in 1904 in Stockholm.

Originally the company was located in Arbetargatan, but later it moved to Liljeholmen. Together with his classmates from Chalmers University of Technology K. G. Karlsson and Erik L. Magnus, they had the expertise needed for the project. The company started making engines, at first kerosene engines for pumps and agricultural machines. Later they also made boat engines under the name Gurik.

After a few years Ericsson thought it was time to build a car. It was to be powered by a six-cylinder engine, a first for Europe. One of the biggest problems was with the magneto. They asked Bosch for help, but Bosch said they could not solve the problem. In the end Karlsson solved it by using two magnetos. The engine was essentially two Fafnir engines in a row, driving the rear wheels via a chain. The chassis was also made in Germany. In 1905 the car was finished. Because of its size it was nicknamed Ormen Långe ('the Long Serpent', so called after the viking longship of the same name). According to news reports it had a top speed of 60 km/h (37 mph). However, the market was not ready for such a car and it did not enter production. GEA imported, assembled and adopted cars for the Swedish market. The company folded in 1909.

Ericsson later designed the 1933 Volvo Venus Bilo, a very early example of streamlined cars.
