= Hilda Ericsson =

Swedish engineer and business executive (1860–1941)

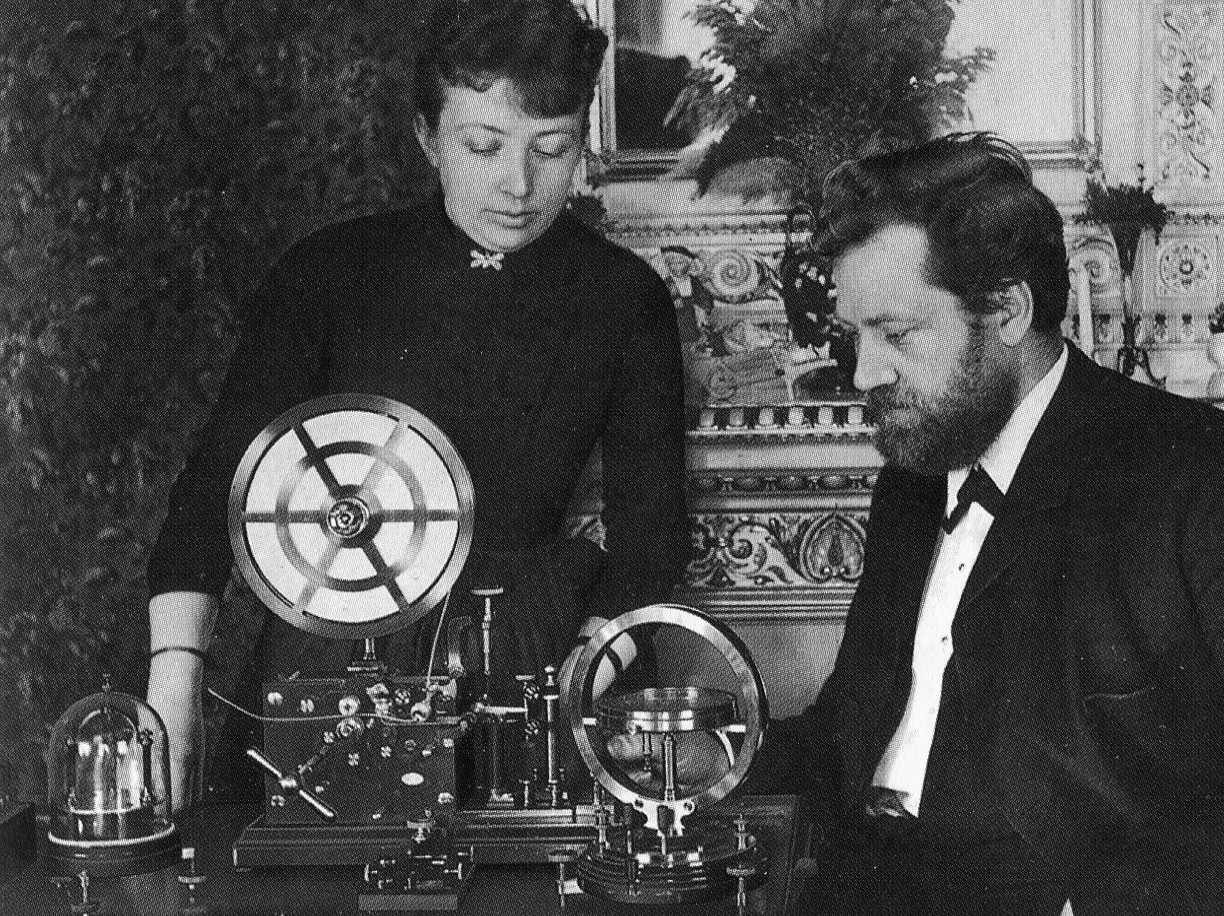
- Hilda Ericsson and her husband Lars Magnus Ericsson
- Born: Hilda Simonsson; 3 August 1860; Stockholm, Sweden
- Died: 3 January 1943
- Occupation: Entrepreneur
- Spouse: Lars Magnus Ericsson (m. 1878–1926)

Hilda Carolina Ericsson (née Simonsson; 3 August 1860 – 3 January 1941) was a Swedish entrepreneur. She founded the telecommunications company Ericsson together with her husband Lars Magnus Ericsson. She was involved in testing inventions and developing new products. In her husband's absence, she took over the company's management.

== Early life, marriage and family ==
Hilda Ericsson was born the only child of Carolina Margaretha Nilsson and Peter Simon Simonsson, a saddler appointed to the Royal Stables. When she met Lars Magnus Ericsson, she was 17 years old and he was almost 31. Her father had called him to their home to repair an organ.

They married one year later in 1878, after she had turned 18, and they had four children together: Johan (1879–1881), Gustaf (1880–1965), Anna (1881–1967) and Lars Magnus Jr. "Lalle" (1892–1921). When her daughter Anna was only six weeks old, her eldest son Johan died from pulmonary oedema. The couple also lost their son Lalle as a young adult due to tuberculosis, although Hilda made numerous trips with him over many years in the hope of curing him.

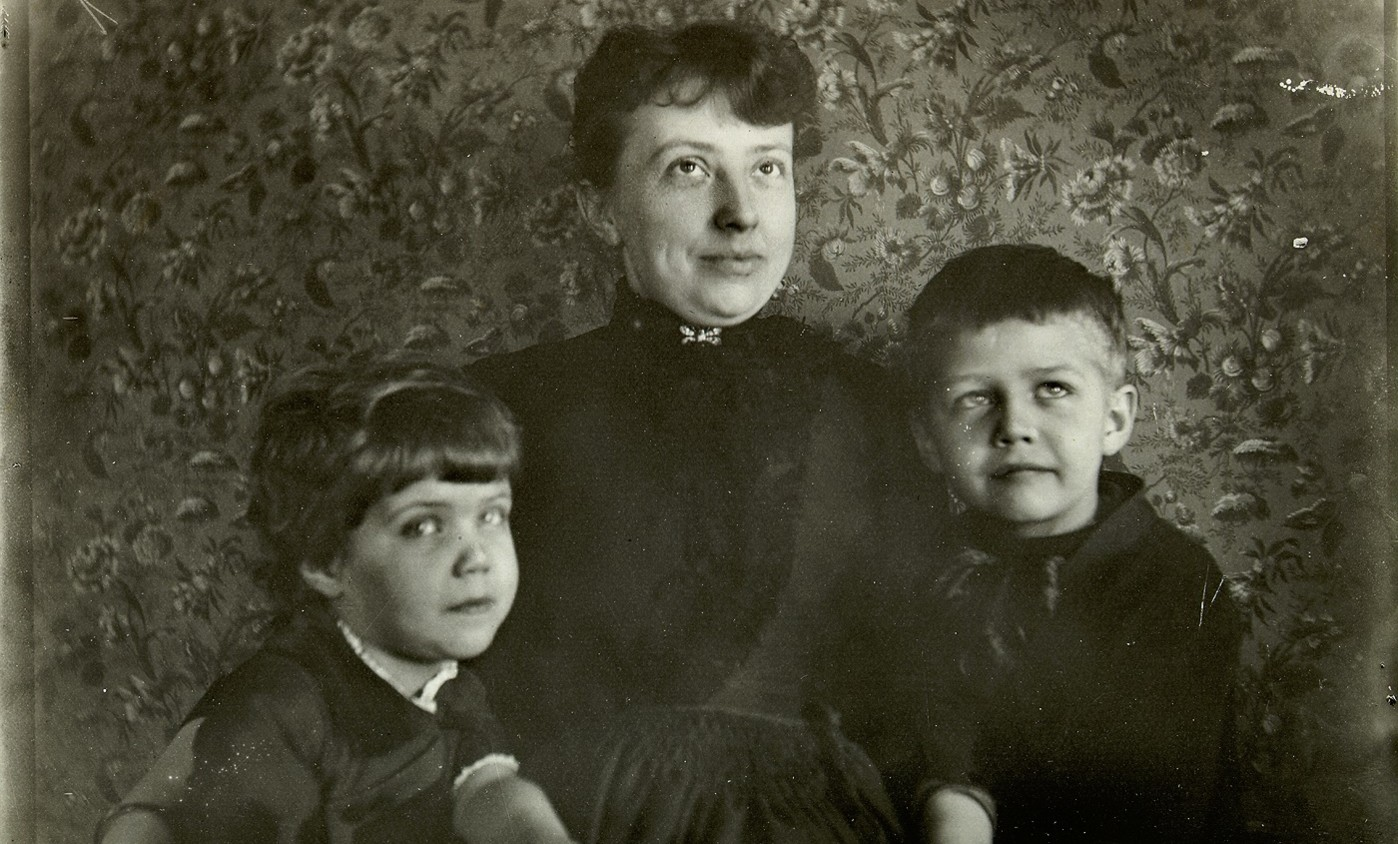
Hilda Ericsson and her children Gustaf and Anna, photographed in 1885

== Telephones and business ==
In the same year as their wedding, Lars Magnus Ericsson and Carl Johan Andersson, one of his former colleagues, founded a mechanical workshop for repairing telephones, the L.M. Ericsson & Co. Mekaniska Verkstad. It was located in Drottninggatan in Stockholm.

During the infancy of their children and her pregnancies, Hilda Ericsson was involved in testing new products and in developing their own telephones - a new invention at that time. As she had a better education than her husband, she was responsible for finances, clients and managed deliveries.

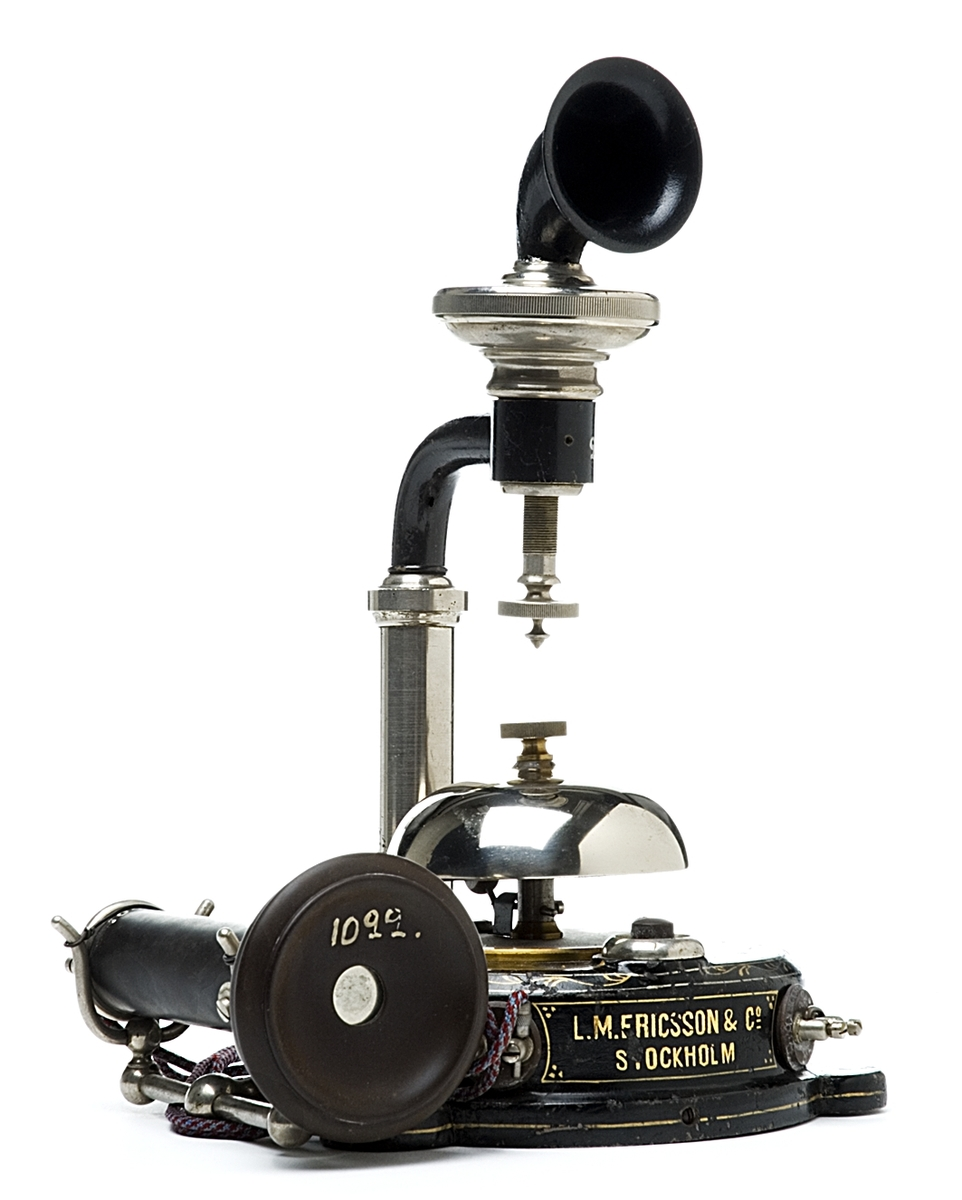
This is one of the early Ericsson telephones from 1881.

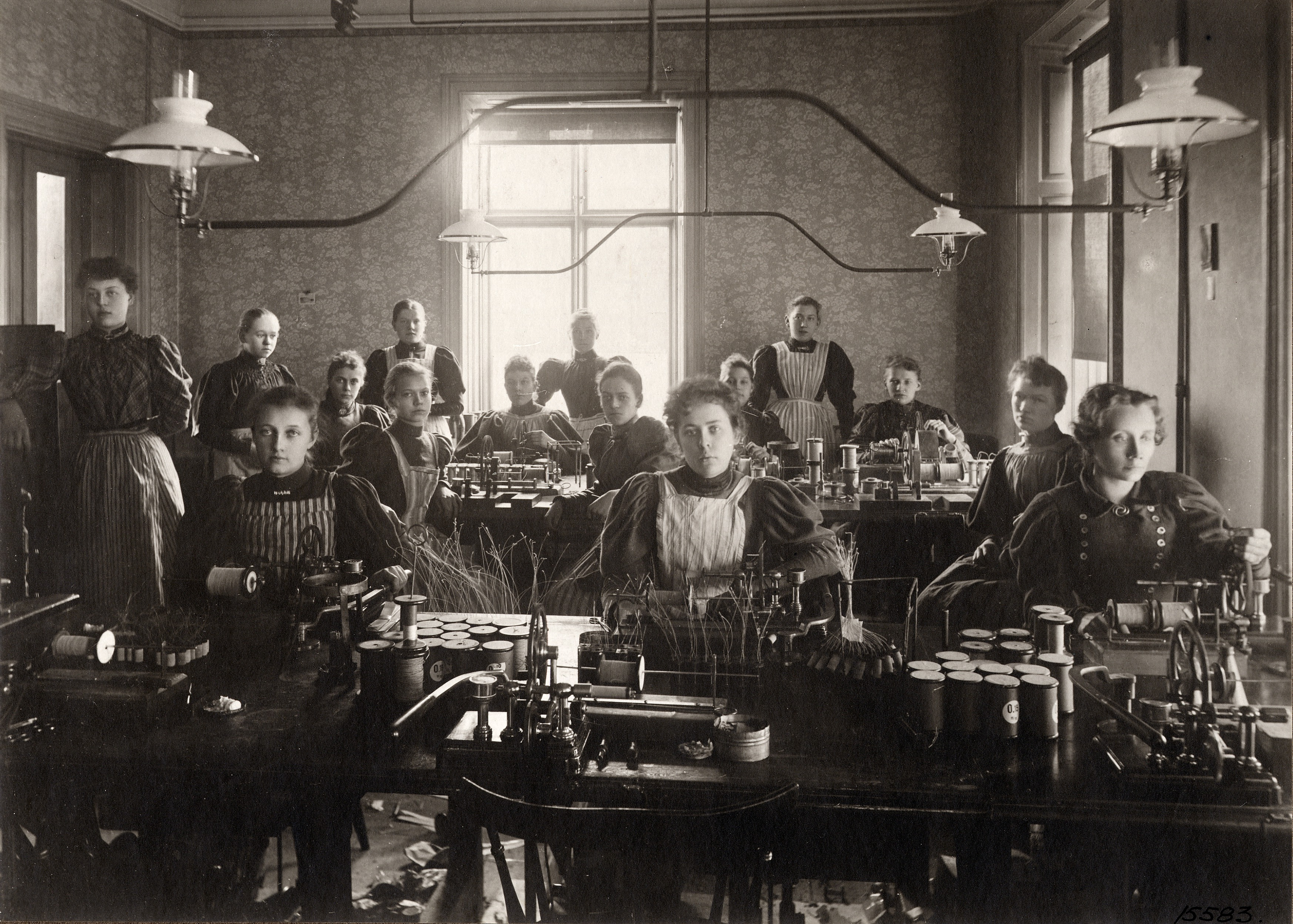
Female workers at LM Ericsson twisting on Tulegatan 5 in 1895.

As the company grew, more employees were hired. At that time, winding of electromagnetic coils with satin-coated copper wire was considered women's work. Hence, a third of the workforce was female in 1881. It was Hilda Ericsson who was responsible for the company's female employees.

She also took over management of the growing company when her husband was traveling, for example, when he was at the International Exposition of Electricity in Paris in 1881.

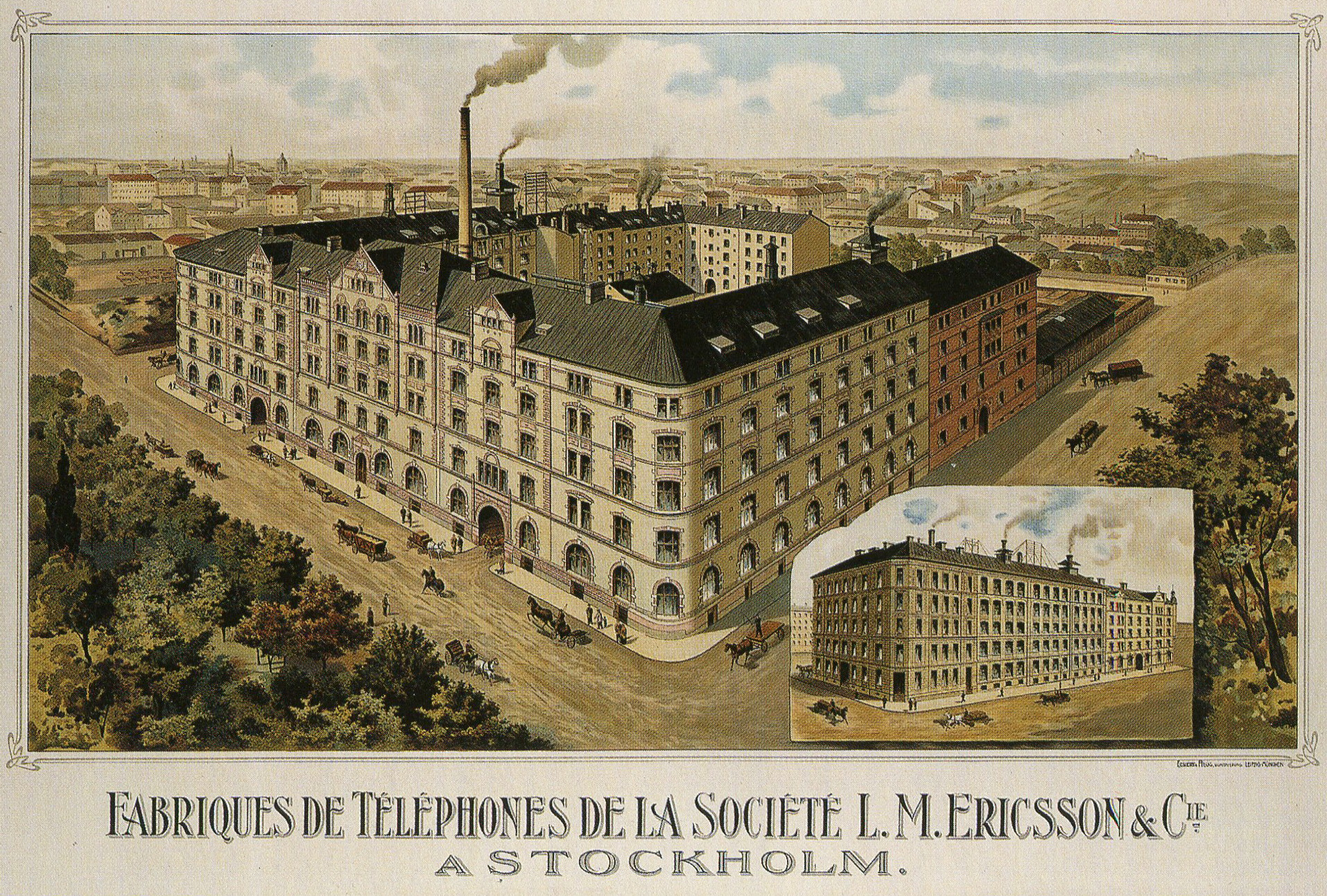
Ericsson's factory in Tulegatan, Stockholm.

Although her contribution to the company's success is traceable through the vast correspondence she had with her husband, she was not credited during her lifetime. On the contrary: after the opening of the large factory in Tulegatan and the production of the 20,000th telephone, all employees were portrayed to commemorate the event, but there was no mention of Hilda Ericsson and no photographs.

== Farming ==
In 1903, both left the company (which had already developed globally) and bought a farm in Alby, in the South of Stockholm district. They established a model farm, in which she was responsible for finances, he for agricultural innovations.

When she died in 1941, she was buried next to her husband in the Botkyrka's cemetery.
