= Jacques Bernard (actor) =

French actor (1929–2024)

- Born: May 7, 1929; Paris, France
- Died: February 18, 2024 (aged 94); France
- Occupation(s): Actor, playwright
- Notable work: Les Enfants terribles, Darling Caroline

Jacques Bernard (7 May 1929–18 February 2024) was a French actor. He appeared in Les Enfants terribles (1950) by Jean-Pierre Melville and Darling Caroline (1951). He was born in Paris. His mother, Josyane, was a motion picture actress active from the end of the 1920s until the beginning of sound film. Bernard died on 18 February 2024, at the age of 94.

== Theatre ==
=== Author ===
- 1961: Niki-Nikou by Jacques Bernard, directed by Christian-Gérard, Théâtre de la Potinière
- 1977: Une femme presque fidèle by Jacques Bernard, directed by Claude Brosset, Élysée Montmartre

=== Comedian ===
- Fin des années 1950: tournées classiques, festivals
- 1958: Faust by Paul Valéry, directed by Yves Gasc, Théâtre Gramont
- 1961: Horace by Pierre Corneille, directed by Jean-François Rémi, Alliance française
- 1961: Niki-Nikou by Jacques Bernard, directed by Christian-Gérard, Théâtre de la Potinière
- 1973: Seul le poisson rouge est au courant by Jean Barbier and Dominique Nohain, directed by Dominique Nohain, Théâtre Charles de Rochefort, Théâtre des Nouveautés, then Théâtre des Capucines
- 1977: Une femme presque fidèle by Jacques Bernard, directed by Claude Brosset, Élysée Montmartre

== Filmography ==
=== Actor ===
==== Film ====
- 1950: Les Enfants terribles by Jean-Pierre Melville: Gérard
- 1951: Darling Caroline by Richard Pottier: Henri de Bièvre
- 1953: Horizons sans fin by Jean Dréville: Pigeon
- 1953: Quintuplets in the Boarding School by René Jayet: Francis
- 1953: Le Grand Pavois by Jack Pinoteau
- 1955: Chantage by Guy Lefranc
- 1955: Marguerite de la nuit by Claude Autant-Lara
- 1955: Tamango by John Berry
- 1957: Police judiciaire by Maurice de Canonge
- 1960: Love and the Frenchwoman: Narrator
- 1960: Normandie-Niémen by Jean Dréville: Perrier
- 1961: Alerte au barrage by Jacques Daniel-Norman
- 1962: Le Scorpion
- 1963: Tante Aurore viendra ce soir: Léonard Berdiller
- 1966: Le Chien fou by Eddy Matalon: The inspector
- 1966: Les Combinards by Jean-Claude Roy: Claude
- 1967: Comment les séduire by Jean-Claude Roy
- 1967: Réseau secret by Jean Bastia
- 1968: The Black Hand by Max Pécas
- 1970: Les Amours particulières (or Malaise) by Gérard Trembasiewicz: Georges Garais
- 1973: L'Insolent by Jean-Claude Roy: L’élégant
- 1973: Le Sang des autres
- 1973: Les Confidences érotiques d'un lit trop accueillant by Michel Lemoine
- 1974: Les petites saintes y touchent by Michel Lemoine
- 1976: Les Nuits chaudes de Justine by Jean-Claude Roy
- 1977: La Grande Extase
- 1981: Madame Claude 2: Pelletier

==== Television ====
- 1961: Épreuves à l'appui, épisode 21 de la série TV Les Cinq Dernières Minutes directed by Claude Loursais
- 196: Les Cinq Dernières Minutes, episode La Chasse aux grenouilles directed by Claude Loursais
- 1968: Tarif de nuit (Les Cinq Dernières Minutes, episode 46, TV) by Guy Séligmann
- 1972: Figaro-ci, Figaro-là (telefilm): La Blache
- 1973: Joseph Balsamo, television serial by André Hunebelle: The dolphin
- 1973: La Ligne d'ombre (television film): Gabriel
- 1974: Cadoudal (television film): Thriot
- 1974: Le Fol Amour de Monsieur de Mirabeau (TV serial): Saint-Mauris
- 1976: Au théâtre ce soir: Une femme presque fidèle by Jacques Bernard, mise en scène Jacques Mauclair, directed by Pierre Sabbagh, Théâtre Édouard VII
- 1977: Les Enquêtes du commissaire Maigret, episode: Maigret and Monsieur Charles by Jean-Paul Sassy
- 1982: La Tendresse by Bernard Queysanne

== Dubbing ==
- Jackie Chan in:
  - New Fist of Fury: A Lung
  - To Kill with Intrigue: Hsiao Lei
  - Snake in the Eagle's Shadow: Chien Fu
  - Drunken Master: Wong Fei-hung
  - Spiritual Kung Fu: Yi-Lang
  - The Fearless Hyena: Shing Lung
  - Dragon Fist: Tang How-yuen
  - Half a Loaf of Kung Fu: Jiang
  - Fantasy Mission Force: Sammy
  - Dragon Lord: Dragon
  - Project A: Dragon Mi Yong
  - My Lucky Stars: Muscle
- Game of Death II: Billy Lo (Kim Tai Chung)

=== Discography ===
Songs written and interpreted by Jacques Bernard

- 1982: Fidèle à ma façon, composed by Jacky Reggan
- 1982: Les bas noirs, composed by Jacky Reggan
- Jacques Bernard is also the author of songs interpreted by Rika Zaraï, Anne Vanderlove and Jean-Claude Pascal

== Publications ==
- Le présent du passé: souvenirs d’un acteur, L'Harmattan, (2012, 200 p. ISBN 9782296968141
