= Two Men in Manhattan =

Deux hommes dans Manhattan
- French theatrical release poster
- Directed by: Jean-Pierre Melville
- Written by: Jean-Pierre Melville
- Produced by: Florence Melville; Alain Térouanne
- Starring: Jean-Pierre Melville; Pierre Grasset
- Cinematography: Nicolas Hayer
- Edited by: Monique Bonnot
- Music by: Christian Chevallier; Martial Solal
- Distributed by: Columbia Films S.A.
- Release date: 16 October 1959 (France)
- Running time: 85 min
- Country: France
- Languages: French; English

Two Men in Manhattan (French: Deux hommes dans Manhattan) is a 1959 French film noir written and directed by Jean-Pierre Melville. It stars Melville and Pierre Grasset as two French journalists in New York City who are searching for a missing United Nations diplomat. Although Melville occasionally played bit parts in the films of other directors (most notably the role of Parvulesco in Jean-Luc Godard's 1960 film Breathless), Two Men in Manhattan was his only starring role, and the only time he acted in one of his own films, other than providing the off-screen narration for Bob le flambeur (1956).

== Plot ==
The evening of December 23, Moreau, a reporter for Agence France-Presse (AFP), is asked by his editor to find out why Fèvre-Berthier, the French delegate to the United Nations, did not attend that day's meeting of the General Assembly. Moreau talks to McKimmie, an information officer at the UN, who does not know anything, but mentions Fèvre-Berthier's family is also trying to find the diplomat, and then Fèvre-Berthier's secretary, who suggests he may be with a woman, but does not know who or where.

At a dead end, Moreau asks his friend Delmas, an alcoholic tabloid photographer, for help. Delmas has taken pictures of Fèvre-Berthier with three different women who are not his wife, so Moreau and Delmas set off to find out if Fèvre-Berthier is with one of them. They visit Judith Nelson, a stage actress, between the acts of a Broadway play at the Mercury Theater, Virginia Graham, a jazz singer, at a Capitol Records recording studio, and Bessie Reed, a burlesque dancer, at the Ridgewood Rathskeller, and even talk to Gloria, a high-end call girl who "specializes in diplomats", at a French-Chinese-themed brothel, but do not find Fèvre-Berthier. Dejected, they go to a diner, where they hear on the radio that Judith slit her wrists just after they left her.

Moreau and Delmas go to the hospital and manage to sneak into Judith's room. She tells Moreau that she tried to kill herself because she loved Fèvre-Berthier, but he is dead. When she begins to become hysterical and does not want to say any more, Delmas demands to know where Fèvre-Berthier is and how he died until he learns that Judith had found the diplomat dead in her apartment, presumably of a heart attack.

After taking a picture of Judith, Delmas steals her keys, and he and Moreau go to her apartment, where they find Fèvre-Berthier's corpse sitting up on a sofa. While Moreau calls his boss to give an update, Delmas moves the body to the bed so he can take a picture that will sell for more money, which shocks Moreau. Rouvier, Moreau's boss' boss, comes to the apartment and tells Delmas that Fèvre-Berthier was a hero of the French Resistance and it will not be reported that he died in the apartment of his mistress. Unmoved by Rouvier's story, Delmas reluctantly gives Rouvier a roll of film after Moreau indicates he intends to take the pictures by force. The three men put Fèvre-Berthier in Rouvier's car and leave it to be found there.

Incensed, Delmas tells Moreau that he intends to recoup some of his losses by getting a picture of Fèvre-Berthier's wife right after he tells her that she is a widow. Moreau comes along so he can at least tell the woman gently, but, before he can say anything, Anne Fèvre-Berthier, the diplomat's daughter, enters and asks her mother to leave the room. Anne has been following Moreau since he left McKimmie's office, hoping he would lead her to her father. She knows about Fèvre-Berthier's affair with Judith, but says her mother does not.

Delmas abruptly runs away, and Moreau and Anne chase him. Realizing Delmas gave Rouvier a decoy roll of film, Moreau looks for Delmas at a photo lab, his apartment, and the offices of various newspapers and magazines. After searching for two hours, Moreau figures Delmas has probably already sold the pictures and will be celebrating with a drink at the Pike Slip Inn. He and Anne go there and find Delmas, who is very intoxicated. Moreau punches Delmas and leaves, and Anne, tears in her eyes, exchanges a look with Delmas before following.

Staggering out into the early-morning light, Delmas decides not to try to drive and begins to walk. He passes a storm drain and, after some consideration, pushes two rolls of film through the grate. As he walks away, he laughs to himself.

== Cast ==
- Jean-Pierre Melville as Moreau, a journalist with Agence France-Presse (AFP)
- Pierre Grasset as Pierre Delmas, an alcoholic tabloid photographer
- Christiane Eudes as Anne Fèvre-Berthier, the diplomat's daughter
- Ginger Hall as Judith Nelson, a stage actress
- Colette Fleury as Françoise Bonnot, the diplomat's secretary
- Monique Hennessy as Gloria, a high-end call girl
- Glenda Leigh as Virginia Graham, a jazz singer
- Jean Darcante as Rouvier, Aubert's boss at AFP
- Michèle Bailly as Bessie Reed, a burlesque dancer
- Paula Dehelly as Mrs. Fèvre-Berthier, the diplomat's wife
- Carl Studer as the police sergeant in the diner
- Billy Kearns as the bouncer at the Ridgewood Rathskeller
- Hyman Yanovitz as the stage doorman at the Mercury Theater
- Ad. Tetelman as the cook at the diner
- Art Simmons as Virginia Graham's pianist
- Jerry Mengo as McKimmie, an information officer at the UN
- Jean Lara as Aubert, Moreau's editor at AFP
- Jean-Pierre Darras as the drunk in the diner (uncredited)

== Production ==
The film was made for 65 million French francs, which, though quite a small sum, was a significant increase over the budget of Melville's previous film, Bob le flambeur (1956). Filming took place between November 1958 and April 1959. After the exterior shots were filmed in New York, the interiors were filmed at the Boulogne-Billancourt Studios in Paris from February to April, with several French actors playing American characters. Although he was a lifelong Americanophile who incorporated American iconography and filmmaking tropes into his work throughout his career, Melville only shot parts of one other film, 1963's Magnet of Doom, in the United States.

== Release and reception ==
Two Men in Manhattan was Melville's least successful film at the box office, managing to sell just 308,524 tickets, which was less than half that of Bob le Flambeur three years earlier. It received a mixed critical reception upon its release, with Jean-Luc Godard and Cahiers du Cinéma praising its evocative atmosphere and Melville's direction, but Le Monde and L’Aurore criticizing it as a boring, poorly written excuse for Melville to indulge his fascination with America. Some of the criticism reflected an overall antipathy to the film's perceived place in the French New Wave filmmaking movement, which began in the late 1950s.

There was a significant positive reappraisal of the film in 2013, when it was released on DVD and screened in New York and elsewhere. At this time, Richard Brody of The New Yorker described it as a "snappy and streetwise mystery" constructed around "a politically inspired and rigorously principled conflict pitting journalistic candor against what one character calls ‘the prestige of France.'" In The Dissolve, Scott Tobias wrote that the film "feels neither French nor American, but some beguiling combination of both," while praising its black-and-white cinematography and careful examination of the moral dilemma at its center.
