= Léon Morin, Priest =

- Film poster
- Directed by: Jean-Pierre Melville
- Screenplay by: Jean-Pierre Melville
- Based on: Léon Morin, prêtre by Béatrix Beck
- Produced by: Carlo Ponti; Georges de Beauregard
- Starring: Jean-Paul Belmondo; Emmanuelle Riva; Irène Tunc
- Cinematography: Henri Decaë
- Edited by: Jacqueline Meppiel; Nadine Marquand; Marie-Josèphe Yoyotte
- Music by: Martial Solal
- Distributed by: Lux Compagnie Cinématographique de France
- Release date: 22 September 1961
- Running time: 117 minutes
- Country: France
- Language: French
- Box office: 1,703,758 admissions (France)

Léon Morin, Priest (French: Léon Morin, prêtre) is a 1961 French drama film directed by Jean-Pierre Melville. It was adapted by Melville from Béatrix Beck's novel The Passionate Heart (French: Léon Morin, prêtre), which won the Prix Goncourt in 1952. Set during WWII in Occupied France, the film stars Emmanuelle Riva as a jaded, lapsed Catholic mother and widow of a Jewish husband, who finds herself falling in love with a young, altruistic priest, played by Jean-Paul Belmondo.

For his work in the film, Belmondo was nominated for the BAFTA Film Award for Best Foreign Actor. At the 1961 Venice Film Festival, the film won the “Award of the City of Venice” and was nominated for the Golden Lion.

== Plot ==
Barny is a young mother raising her daughter, named France, in a small town in the French Alps during the Occupation of France. She works correcting assignments for a Parisian correspondence school that has moved to the town. Her Jewish husband was killed in the war, and, sexually frustrated, she finds herself attracted to Sabine, the administrative secretary at the school.

As a jaded lapsed-Catholic-turned-atheist and militant communist, Barny is cynical about religion, but she and a few of her Jewish and communist friends decide to have their children baptized to try to protect them from the occupying troops. Some time afterward, Barny impulsively enters a church in town to make a fake confession. She decides to talk to Léon Morin, who, being a young curate with a name that does not strike her as bourgeois, seems most likely to take the joke in good humor. In the confessional, she attempts to provoke Léon by questioning and criticizing Catholicism, but, instead of getting offended, he engages her in a calm theological discussion. The altruistic priest offers to lend Barny some books, and they arrange a time to meet. Barny exits the church in a daze.

For France's protection, Barny sends the girl to live on a secluded farm. She begins to visit Léon regularly, finding his moral strength and the steadfastness of his faith impressive as he works to help her on her spiritual journey. Despite her resistance, Barny gradually finds herself drawn in by Léon's musings, philosophies, and interpretations of passages from the Bible.

The circumstances in the town get worse for the residents after the Germans fully push out the Italians, and Barny and Léon both do what they can to help and protect those in need. Barny's feelings for Sabine change after the distress the woman feels after her brother is arrested by the Gestapo and taken to Germany causes her to seem to age several years in just a few weeks.

Reluctantly, but feeling compelled to do so, Barny decides to fully return to the Church. She and Christine, a collaborationist coworker with whom she became friends after they discovered they were both talking with Léon, each refer a friend to Léon. The other women's reactions to him cause Barny to see him in a different light, and, noticing for the first time how handsome he is, she begins to develop romantic feelings.

One night, the Germans abandon the town. France comes back to live with Barny, so she tells Léon she can no longer come to visit him, and he offers to come to her instead. On one visit, Barny asks Léon if he would marry her if he were a Protestant minister. He does not answer, but becomes perturbed and abruptly leaves, and they do not see each other for a while. Eventually, he knocks on Barny's door and proceeds to talk about theology as though nothing happened. She cannot focus and reaches out to touch his arm, causing him to jump out of his chair. Before leaving, he tells her that he will return for more conversation, but she must come to him at the church to confess and receive penance for trying to lead a priest astray.

Léon learns he is being transferred to another parish, and he tells Barny. They catch France eavesdropping and he puts her back to bed, prompting Barny to think about God's irony in finally bringing Léon into her bedroom, not to sleep with her and break his vows, but to comfort her daughter.

The correspondence school announces it is moving back to Paris, which means Barny will be leaving the town around the same time as Léon. On the night before his departure, he asks her to visit him. She thanks him and they have a brief conversation before Barny bids Léon farewell. He tells her they will meet again, in another life. Barny tearfully leaves and stumbles out into the street.

== Cast ==
- Jean-Paul Belmondo as Léon Morin
- Emmanuelle Riva as Barny
- Irène Tunc as Christine Sangredin
- Nicole Mirel as Sabine Levy
- Gisèle Grimm as Lucienne
- Marco Behar as Edelman
- Monique Bertho as Marion
- Monique Hennessy as Arlette
- Cédric Grant as American Soldier
- George Lambert as American Soldier
- Chantal, Patricia, & Marielle Gozzi as France at different ages

Gérard Buhr (who had previously been in Melville's Bob le Flambeur) has a small part as a German soldier named Gunther, and Howard Vernon (who starred in Melville's Le Silence de la Mer and had a supporting role in Bob le Flambeur) can briefly be seen as a German colonel.

== Release ==
=== Critical reception ===
On the review aggregator site Rotten Tomatoes, Leon Morin, Priest has a 96% "Fresh" approval rating based on 24 reviews.

Roger Ebert added the film to his Great Movies list in 2009. He described Léon Morin, Priest as “a consistently intriguing film,” praising Melville’s skillful manipulation of expectations and the film’s sincere religiosity. The Criterion Collection essay by Gary Indiana calls the film “an exquisitely circumscribed and powerful picture of how people cope in a world devoid of certainty,” praising its focused emotional and moral clarity. The New Yorker’s Richard Brody describes the central dynamic as “an extraordinary spiritual joust … which feels as fraught as any gun-toting standoff in one of the director’s later thrillers,” CatholicCulture.org regarded it as “one of the best priest movies ever made,” emphasizing its realistic, tasteful depiction of pastoral challenges and noting how it thoughtfully portrays Barny’s path toward faith.

=== Legacy and influence ===
Although less widely known internationally than Jean-Pierre Melville’s crime films, Léon Morin, Priest has been recognized as a significant work in his exploration of resistance and moral conflict. Brody situated it within Melville’s broader “cinema of resistance,” linking it to later works such as Army of Shadows. Critics have also highlighted its performances, particularly Jean-Paul Belmondo’s portrayal of Morin early in his career and Emmanuelle Riva’s complex performance as Barny, which deepened her reputation following Hiroshima mon amour.

Modern commentators have continued to revisit the film. Film Comment praised it for the way it “plays against expectations” by placing spiritual tension and unfulfilled desire at the center of a wartime narrative. Contemporary critics have compared its probing treatment of faith and intimacy to later works exploring similar themes; one reviewer even likened its mix of wit, moral conflict, and suppressed attraction to the modern series Fleabag. The film’s continuing circulation through restorations and Criterion releases has reinforced its reputation as a cornerstone of Melville’s oeuvre and an enduring example of postwar French cinema.

=== Home media ===
The film was released on DVD and Blu-ray by The Criterion Collection in July 2011. In 2019, Kino Lorber released a 4K-restoration of the 128-minute director's cut of the film on DVD and Blu-ray.
