= Daniel Cauchy =

French actor (1930–2020)

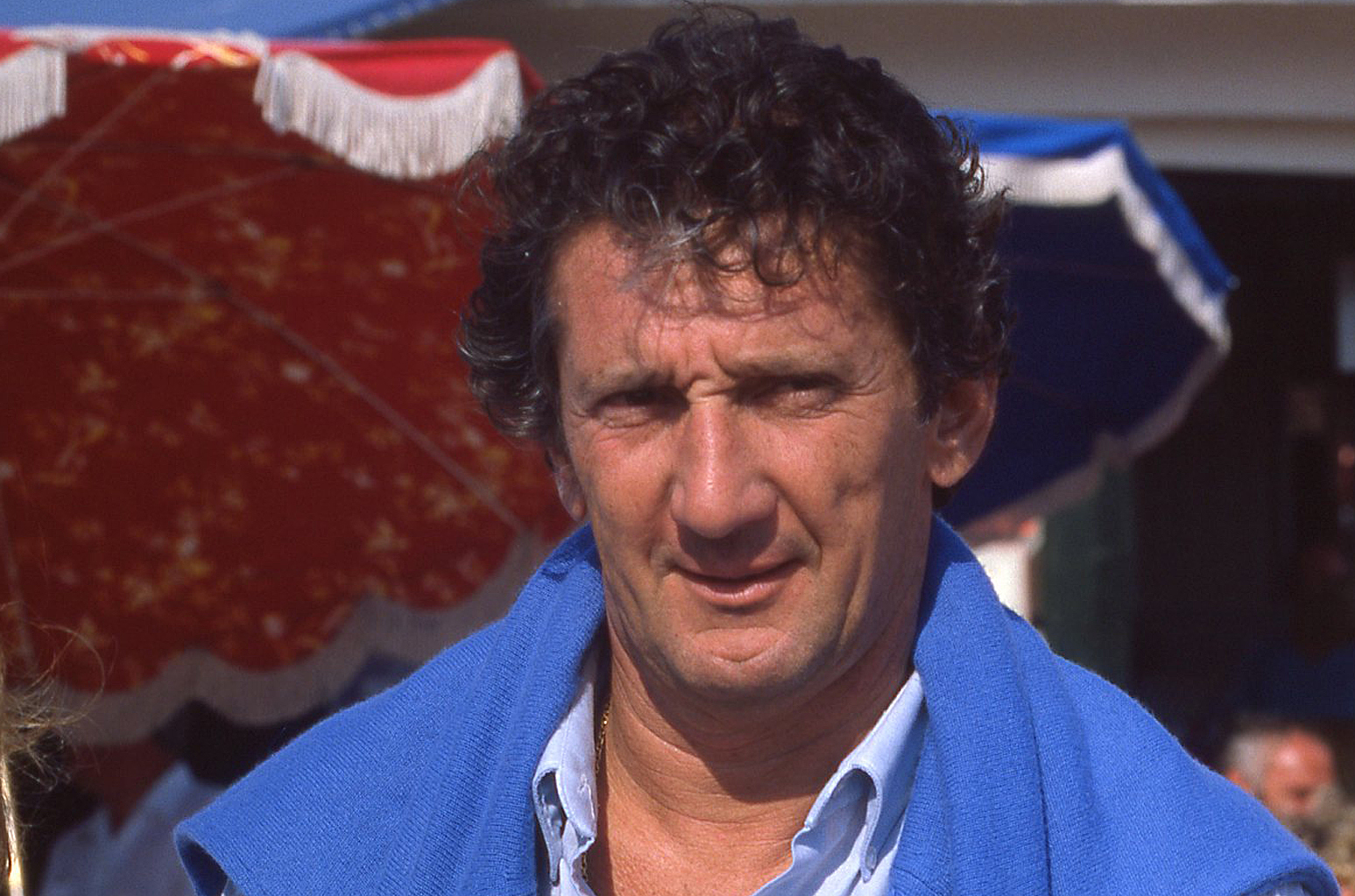
- Born: 13 March 1930; Boulogne-Billancourt, France
- Died: 8 May 2020 (aged 90); Neuilly-sur-Seine, France
- Occupation: Actor
- Years active: 1951–2000

Daniel Cauchy (13 March 1930 – 8 May 2020) was a French film actor and producer. He was known for his role in Jean-Pierre Melville's 1956 crime film Bob le flambeur.

He died at 90 years of age from complications of COVID-19.

His son Didier Cauchy also became an actor.

== Partial filmography ==
- Nous irons à Monte-Carlo (1951) – Un fan de Melissa (uncredited)
- Love, Madame (1952) – Patrick -un jeune homme
- The Green Glove (1952) – Minor Role (uncredited)
- Crimson Curtain (1952) – Léon
- Follow That Man (1953) – Pierrot
- When You Read This Letter (1953) – Biquet
- Maternité clandestine (1953) – Mickey
- His Father's Portrait (1953) – L'existentialiste (uncredited)
- The Count of Monte Cristo (1954) – Bruno
- Touchez pas au Grisbi (1954) – Fifi
- Les Impures (1954) – Dédé
- Huis-clos (1954) – (uncredited)
- The Price of Love (1955) – Paulo
- Black Dossier (1955) – Jo
- Montmartre Nights (1955) – Julien
- Impasse des vertus (1955) – Fanfan
- Bob le flambeur (1956) – Paulo
- Police judiciaire (1958) – Raoul Menaz
- En légitime défense (1958) – Dédé
- Miss Pigalle (1958) – Clo-Clo
- Sacrée jeunesse (1958) – Gérard
- Ça n'arrive qu'aux vivants (1959) – Bébert
- I Spit on Your Grave (1959) – Sonny
- Secret professionnel (1959) – Michel Langeac
- Sergeant X (1960) – Fred
- Les mordus (1960) – Mosco
- Samedi soir (1961) – Jacky
- A Touch of Treason (1962) – Patrick Lemoine
- Arsène Lupin Versus Arsène Lupin (1962) – Charly
- Mathias Sandorf (1962) – Pescade
- D'où viens-tu Johnny? (1963) – Marcel
- The Troops of St. Tropez (1964) – Richard
- The Mad Heart (1970) – Photographe
- La liberté en croupe (1970) – Un automobiliste dans l'embouteillage (uncredited)
- The Hostage Gang (1973) – Gilbert Nodier
- La fille d'Amérique (1977) – Luc
- Actors (2000) – Christian Decharme (final film role)

== Bibliography ==
- Gifford, Barry. Out of the Past. University Press of Mississippi, 2001.
