= The Passionate Heart =

1952 novel by Béatrix Beck

First 'purple collection' edition (1952)

The Passionate Heart (French: Léon Morin, prêtre) is a 1952 novel by Béatrix Beck, which won the Prix Goncourt. It was published in the UK as The Priest (1953) and in the US as The Passionate Heart (1953).

A movie version was made in 1961 called Léon Morin, Priest (French: Léon Morin, prêtre), directed and scripted by Jean-Pierre Melville, and starring Jean-Paul Belmondo and Emmanuelle Riva. Belmondo was nominated for a BAFTA Award for Best Foreign Actor. Another version entitled La Confession was released in 2016, directed by Nikolas Boukhrief.

== Plot ==
In a small French town during the Occupation, Barny is a young, wayward, sexually frustrated widow, living with her little girl. She is also a communist militant who long ago decided that the easiest way was the best. One day she enters a church, randomly chooses a priest and starts criticizing the religion. But the priest is Leon Morin, who is young, handsome, clever and altruistic. He believes that any sin can be expunged by a good dose of faith, and does not offer her the reaction she was expecting. She is disturbed. She starts frequenting Morin, impressed by his moral strength, while he makes it his mission to steer her onto the right path.
