= Nicole Stéphane =

French film director (1923–2007)

- Born: Nicole de Rothschild; 27 May 1923; Paris, France
- Died: 13 March 2007 (aged 83); France
- Occupations: Actress, Producer, Film director

Nicole Stéphane (French pronunciation: [nikɔl stefan]; born Baroness Nicole de Rothschild, 27 May 1923 – 13 March 2007) was a French actress, producer and director.

== Biography ==
The elder of the two daughters of Baron James-Henri de Rothschild and his first wife, Claude Dupont, Nicole Stéphane was a member of the Rothschild banking family of France. Her immediate family, however, also was deeply immersed in the arts. Her paternal grandfather, Baron Henri de Rothschild, was a playwright and theatrical producer who wrote under the names Charles des Fontaines and André Pascal and owned Théâtre Antoine and Théâtre Pigalle. Her first cousin Philippine de Rothschild was an actress with the Comédie-Française, using the name Philippine Pascal. And her father's brother, the vintner Philippe de Rothschild, wrote plays, owned theatres and produced films.

Stéphane joined the army during the Second World War, and was briefly imprisoned in Spain in 1942 after crossing the Pyrenées while she was trying to join the Free French. She was also a liaison agent in Germany. As an actress, she is best known for her role in two films by Jean-Pierre Melville, Le Silence de la mer (1949) and Les Enfants terribles (1950). In 1950, Stéphane introduced her cousin (by marriage), Francine Weisweiller, to Jean Cocteau, whom she'd met while acting in Les Enfants terribles. Weisweiller would become a primary patron and close friend of Cocteau's.

Her final film as an actress was Carve Her Name with Pride (1958). Her acting career was cut short by a car accident. She reoriented herself towards production, helping Georges Franju and Jean-Pierre Melville in particular. Among her production credits was Swann in Love (1984), an adaptation of the first novel in Marcel Proust's cycle Remembrance of Things Past, which starred Jeremy Irons and Ornella Muti. She was also honoured as a member of Ordre des Arts et des Lettres by the government of France.

In the 1970s, Stéphane was the partner of American writer and critic Susan Sontag. Sontag dedicated her 1977 book On Photography to her. She also had an affair with Colette de Jouvenel, daughter of author Colette.

== Selected filmography ==
Actress

- Le Silence de la mer (1949) - La nièce
- Les Enfants Terribles (1950) - Elisabeth
- Born of Unknown Father (1950) - Jacqueline Mussot
- The Unfrocked One (1954) - Catherine Grandpré
- Monsieur et Madame Curie (1956, Short) - Marie Curie / narrator
- Carve Her Name with Pride (1958) - Denise Bloch (final film role)

Producer

- To Die in Madrid (Frédéric Rossif, 1962), Prix Jean Vigo 1963
- La Vie de château (Jean-Paul Rappeneau, 1965)
- L'Une et l'Autre (René Allio, 1967)
- Phèdre (Pierre Jourdan, 1968)
- Détruire, dit-elle (Marguerite Duras, 1969)
- Promised Lands (Susan Sontag, 1973)
- Sarah (Edgardo Cozarinsky, 1988)

Director

- La Génération du désert (1958) (Short film)
- Une guerre pour une paix (1967) (Short film)
- En attendant Godot à Sarajevo (1993) (Short film)

== Awards ==
- 1953 – Nominated BAFTA Film Award for Best Foreign Actress — Les Enfants terribles (1950)
