= When You Read This Letter =

- Directed by: Jean-Pierre Melville
- Written by: Jacques Deval
- Produced by: Jean-Pierre Melville; Paul Temps
- Starring: Philippe Lemaire; Juliette Gréco; Yvonne Sanson
- Cinematography: Henri Alekan
- Edited by: Marinette Cadix
- Music by: Bernard Peiffer
- Production companies: Daunia; Jad Films; Lux Film; S.G.C.; Titanus
- Distributed by: Les Films Marceau
- Release date: 26 July 1953
- Running time: 104 minutes
- Countries: France; Italy
- Language: French

When You Read This Letter (French: Quand tu liras cette lettre) is a 1953 French-Italian drama film directed by Jean-Pierre Melville and starring Philippe Lemaire, Juliette Gréco and Yvonne Sanson.

It was shot at the Billancourt Studios in Paris. Location filming also take place on the coast of Southern France where the film is set. The film's sets were designed by the art director Robert Gys.

The film was a commercial success and permitted Melville to acquire his own studios to make his future productions.

== Synopsis ==
After their parents die in a road accident, a strongly moral young woman named Thérèse Voise leaves a convent shortly before taking her vows in order to care for her younger sister Denise and run the family stationery shop with her. Thérèse is very protective of Denise and becomes concerned when her sister strikes up an acquaintance with Max, a young amateur boxer and garage mechanic. Max is a self-centered, amoral drifter who is conducting numerous different relationships with girls at nightclubs. He is also pursuing Irène Faugeret, a wealthy married woman, managing to get employment as her chauffeur and become her lover. Max strikes up a friendship of sorts with Biquet, a bellhop at the Hôtel Carlton who acts as Max's eyes and ears, especially as concerns Madame Faugeret.

Denise is attracted to Max, but after a chance meeting at the hotel he sexually assaults her. A distraught Denise attempts to drown herself, and is only narrowly saved from suicide. After she has recovered, Thérèse blackmails Max into getting engaged to Denise by threatening to reveal the circumstances to the police who are already investigating Max for the death in an automobile accident of Irène, his wealthy lover. Max was responsible for Irène Faugeret's death as he had loosened three screws on her car's steering column. Max did not expect her to use the car the night of the fatal accident. He expected Biquet would use it instead, part of their scheme to steal Irène's money and then flee to Tangiers to start a new life. Max was hoping to double-cross Biquet. Instead, he caused Irène Faugeret's death.

Denise is delighted and optimistic about the future. However, Thérèse remains contemptuous of her future brother-in-law.

Max tries to persuade Thérèse that he has fallen in love with her and attempts to seduce her. She rejects his advances, but it remains unclear to what extent she is attracted to him. Max tries to persuade her to run away with him to Tangiers where they can start a new life together. The sincerity of his actions remains in doubt even up to the moment when, having absconded with Denise's dowry and Thérèse's passport, he is killed by a train while trying to board it in order to complete his rendezvous with Thérèse. Philosophically accepting this turn of events, she returns to her convent to become a nun.

== Cast ==
- Philippe Lemaire as Max Trivet
- Juliette Gréco as Thérèse Voise
- Yvonne Sanson as Irène Faugeret
- Irène Galter as Denise Voise
- Daniel Cauchy as Biquet
- Robert Dalban as Dick
- Jacques Deval as Le juge d'instruction
- Fernand Sardou as Le garagiste
- Claude Borelli as Lola
- Roland Lesaffre as Roland
- Marcel Delaître as Le grand-père
- Colette Régis as La supérieure
- Jane Morlet as La grand-mère
- Suzy Willy as Mme Gobert
- Claude Hennesy
- Robert Hébert
- Louis Pérault as Le portier
- Philippe Richard
- Léon Larive as Le greffier
- Colette Fleury
- Jean-Marie Robain
- Suzanne Hédouin
- Marcel Arnal
- Alain Nobis
- Adeline Aucoc
- Louise Nowa
- Mel Martin
- Marjorie as Une danseuse
- Shouky as Une danseuse
- Céline as Une danseuse
- Marie-Thérèse as Une danseuse
- Yvonne de Bray as La voyageuse

== Bibliography ==
- Crisp, C.G. The Classic French Cinema, 1930–1960. Indiana University Press, 1993.
