= Christian Bach (disambiguation) =

Christian Bach (1959–2019) was an Argentine-Mexican actress

Christian Bach may also refer to:

- Christian Bach (cyclist) (born 1979), German cyclist
- Christian Friis Bach (born 1966), Danish politician
- Johann Christian Bach (1735–1782), German composer

== See also ==
- Christian Beck (disambiguation)
