= Ami Aaröe =

Swedish actress (1925–2024)

- Born: Anne-Marie Aaröe; 20 May 1925; Stockholm, Sweden
- Died: 20 October 2024 (aged 99)
- Other names: Amy Aaröe
- Occupation: Actress
- Years active: 1942–1951
- Spouse: Guy Patrick Delmas (deceased)
- Children: 1

Anne-Marie Aaröe (20 May 1925 – 20 October 2024), also known as Ami Aaröe or Amy Aaröe, was a Swedish actress who appeared in films during the 1940s and 1950s.

== Early life and career ==
Aaröe was born in Stockholm, Sweden on 20 May 1925. She was the daughter of captain Arvid Aaröe and his wife Hjördis, née Ström. Ami made her film debut in Hasse Ekman's film Ombyte av tåg, which was filmed in 1942 and premiered in 1943. She had her first speaking role at theatre as Titania in A Midsummer Night's Dream in 1945. Alongside the acting profession, she was also director of the film company Starfilm.

Aaröe made other appearances in other films like ...och efter skymning kommer mörker (1947), A Ship to India (1947), Love, Sunshine and Songs (1948) and Le Silence de la Mer (1949).

== Personal life and death ==
Aaröe was married to the French dancer and graduate engineer Guy Patrick Delmas in 1955, and they had a daughter who was born in Paris. After her husband's death she resided in her villa in Tulegatan, Stockholm. Aaröe died on 20 October 2024, at the age of 99.

== Filmography ==
- Ombyte av tåg (1943) - Aina
- ...och efter skymning kommer mörker (1947)
- A Ship to India (1947) - Young Girl at the beach
- Love, Sunshine and Songs (1948) - Britt
- Le Silence de la Mer (1949) - La fiancée
- The Nuthouse (1951)
