= Edgar Bischoff =

French composer and lyricist

- Also known as: Francis Mainville
- Born: May 20, 1912; Ploiești, Romania
- Died: December 27, 1995 (aged 83) Draveil, France
- Occupation(s): composer, lyricist
- Years active: ~1940s–1970s

Edgar Bischoff (May 20, 1912 – December 27, 1995), also known by the alias Francis Mainville, was a Romanian-born French composer and lyricist.

== Biography ==
Bischoff was born in Ploiești, Romania, the son of Louise (née Schapira) and Léon Bischoff. He studied in the Royal Academy of Music and Dramatic Art in Bucharest and then in the École Normale de Musique de Paris, after which he remained in France. In 1949 he wrote the film score of Le Silence de la mer and later for movies such as mime artist Marcel Marceau's Der Mantel ("Le Manteau", based on Gogol's "The Overcoat"). He continued writing stage music, television and film score to the end of the 1970s. He died in the Paris suburb of Draveil in 1995, aged 83.
