= A Ship Bound for India =

1947 film by Ingmar Bergman

- Theatrical release poster
- Directed by: Ingmar Bergman
- Screenplay by: Ingmar Bergman
- Based on: Skepp till India land by Martin Söderhjelm
- Produced by: Lorens Marmstedt
- Starring: Holger Löwenadler; Anna Lindahl; Birger Malmsten; Gertrud Fridh
- Cinematography: Göran Strindberg
- Edited by: Tage Holmberg
- Music by: Erland von Koch
- Distributed by: Nordisk Tonefilm
- Release date: 22 September 1947
- Running time: 98 minutes
- Country: Sweden
- Language: Swedish

A Ship Bound for India (Swedish: Skepp till Indialand) is a 1947 Swedish melodrama film written and directed by Ingmar Bergman, based on the play by Martin Söderhjelm. It was originally released as A Ship to India in the United Kingdom and Frustration in the United States. The film is about the relationships within a family, a subject with which Bergman often dealt in later films, and uses other common devices of Bergman, such as the hard father figure. Birger Malmsten, who plays the lead character Johannes, went on to feature in several later Bergman films.

The film was entered into the 1947 Cannes Film Festival, where it competed for the Palme d'Or, which was known at the time as the Grand Prix.

== Plot ==
The central part of the film is a flashback in which the protagonist, Johannes, after seven years’ absence at sea, dreams of the events leading up to his leaving home.

At that time Johannes (then about eighteen years of age) is working with a couple of other employees under his domineering father, Captain Blom, who runs a small marine recovery operation. Blom is abusive towards his son, disappointed in him because of a physical abnormality in his back, referring to him as a humpback. Blom spends his evenings drinking and womanizing, although his wife tolerates this in the hope that their former relationship might one day be restored. This hope arises from her knowledge that Blom is suffering from a serious eye disease that will eventually lead to blindness and make him dependant on her. Blom, however, is determined to escape to some exotic eastern location to enjoy the remaining time before he goes blind, and persuades Sally, a variety artiste who is singing in one of the seedy harbour music halls he visits, to accompany him.

The flashback starts with a recovery operation that is being undertaken, but which cannot begin because Blom is still away after a night‘s drinking. Johannes takes the initiative for the first time to get things started, but when Blom returns he intimidates and humiliates his son for doing this. He brings Sally to live in his boat, but Johannes falls in love with her and she reciprocates his affection, albeit with some worldly cynicism. The couple make love in an old mill, and on their return she admits her relationship to Blom, rejecting him and the idea of escape with him.

This, together with Johannes’ growing self-confidence augments the conflict between father and son. The father’s hatred culminates in an attempt to kill Johannes by interrupting the flow of air while he is working to recover a wreck as stand-in for the regular diver. This attempt is thwarted, causing Blom to scuttle the wreck and flee to a room he secretly owns in the city decorated with pictures and objects related to the exotic eastern escape he dreams of. He goes on a rampage to destroy the latter, precipitating his blindness. While being led away by the police he breaks free and throws himself out of a window in an attempted suicide. However this fails, and we later learn that he has incurred paralysing injuries with which he must endure for several years before his eventual death.

After this episode Johannes enlists as a sailor on a ship bound for India, and promises to return to Sally when he has established himself, although Sally does not share his optimism and is reconciled to continuing her sordid existence. He returns for her at the start of the film, successful in his career and with his back deformity ‘cured’. Sally rejects him, even more cynical and disillusioned than before, not believing that her life can be changed. However after waking from the flash-back dream, Johannes seeks out Sally again and after a strenuous argument she agrees to leave with him. The final scene shows them embarking the ship.

== Cast ==
- Birger Malmsten – Johannes Blom
- Holger Löwenadler – Kapten Blom
- Anna Lindahl – Alice Blom
- Gertrud Fridh – Sally
- Naemi Briese – Selma
- Hjördis Petterson – Sofi (as Hjördis Pettersson)
- Lasse Krantz – Hans
- Jan Molander – Bertil
- Erik Hell – Pekka
- Åke Fridell – Variety hall owner
- Douglas Håge – Customs officer (scenes deleted)

Uncredited

- Ami Aaröe – Young girl at the beach
- Torgny Anderberg – Man
- Ingmar Bergman – Man wearing a beret at the funfair
- Rolf Bergström – Blom's companion
- Torsten Bergström – Blom's companion
- John W. Björling – Older man
- Ingrid Borthen – Girl on the street
- Gustaf Hiort af Ornäs – Blom's companion
- Svea Holst – Woman present at the arrest of Blom
- Kiki – Dwarf
- Uno Larsson – Older man with glasses and hat
- Peter Lindgren – Foreign sailor
- Gunnar Nielsen – Young man at the beach
- Charles White – Black sailor
