= Peder A. Aarøe =

Norwegian trade unionist (1868–1927)

- Born: 1868
- Died: 1927 (aged 58–59)
- Occupation: trade unionist
- Known for: chairman of the trade union Møbelindustriarbeiderforbundet, deputy chairman of Norges Kooperative Landsforening, treasurer of the Norwegian Confederation of Trade Unions
- Political party: Norwegian Labour Party

Peder A. Aarøe (1868–1927) was a Norwegian trade unionist.

He was born in Stjørdalen. Aarøe was chairman of the trade union Møbelindustriarbeiderforbundet, and deputy chairman of Norges Kooperative Landsforening from 1913 to his death. He was the treasurer of the Norwegian Confederation of Trade Unions from 1915 to his death.

In 1922, Aarøe was a delegate to the Fourth Comintern Congress. Politically, he belonged to Labour.
