= Bob le flambeur =

1956 film by Jean-Pierre Melville

- Directed by: Jean-Pierre Melville
- Screenplay by: Jean-Pierre Melville; Auguste Le Breton
- Produced by: Jean-Pierre Melville; Serge Silberman
- Starring: Roger Duchesne; Isabelle Corey; Daniel Cauchy; Guy Decomble
- Cinematography: Henri Decaë
- Edited by: Monique Bonnot
- Music by: Eddie Barclay; Jo Boyer
- Production companies: Organisation Générale Cinématographique; La Cyme; Play Art
- Distributed by: Mondial Films
- Release date: August 24, 1956 (Paris)
- Running time: 102 minutes
- Country: France
- Language: French

Bob le flambeur (English translation": "Bob the Gambler" or "Bob the High Roller") is a 1956 French heist gangster film directed by Jean-Pierre Melville and starring Roger Duchesne as Bob. It is often considered both a film noir and a precursor to the French New Wave, the latter because of its use of handheld camera and a single jump cut.

== Plot ==
The film opens with a tracking shot around the Montmartre quarter where the film is set, and the director, Jean-Pierre Melville, as narrator, then says "c'est tout à la fois le ciel [shot over the Basilique du Sacré-Coeur] et... [bird's eye view of the Montmartre Funicular descending, with music poco a poco fortissimo] ... l'enfer [Shot of the Place Pigalle]" ("It is at one and the same time heaven ... and ... hell").

Bob is a gambler who lives on his own in the Montmartre district of Paris, where he is well-liked by the demi-monde community. A former bank robber and convict, he has mostly kept out of trouble for the past 20 years, and is even friends with a Commissaire de police in the Prefecture of Police in Paris, Ledru, whose life he once saved. Ever the gentleman, Bob lets Anne, an attractive young woman who has just lost her job, stay in his apartment in order to keep her from the attentions of Marc, a pimp he hates. Bob declines Anne's advances, instead steering her to his young protégé Paolo, who soon sleeps with her.

Through Jean, an ex-con who is now a croupier at the casino in Deauville, Bob's friend Roger, a safecracker, learns that, by 5:00 in the morning on the day of a big horse race at the nearby track, the casino safe is expected to contain around 800 million French francs in cash, equivalent to a little more than $24,000,000 in 2025. As Bob has had a run of bad luck, he plans to rob the safe, convincing a man named McKimmie to finance the preparations and recruiting a team to carry out the heist. Jean gets detailed floor plans of the casino and the specifications of the safe, and buys a bracelet for his wife, Suzanne, with some of the money he is paid for his services.

The smitten Paolo brags to Anne about the upcoming raid to try to impress her. Not taking him seriously, she lets this information slip to Marc just before the two have sex. Earlier, Marc had been arrested by Ledru for beating up one of his prostitutes, but Ledru had released him on the condition that he provide some information on a bigger crime; Marc's reaction makes Anne realize she may have made a mistake.

The next morning, Anne tells Bob what she did, and he and Roger search for Marc, but cannot find him. Marc tells Ledru that he has heard about a caper involving Bob, but needs a few more hours to obtain confirmation, so Ledru lets him go. When Bob tells Paolo about Marc and Anne, the young man finds Marc and shoots the man dead just as he is about to tell Ledru what he was able to find out. Meanwhile, Suzanne discovers where her husband got the money to buy the bracelet and decides to ask Bob for a larger share of the take. They drive to Paris, but are unable to find him or Roger. She then persuades Jean to back out of it and anonymously tips off Ledru.

Thinking that, with Marc dead, their plan is still a secret, Bob and his team head to Deauville. Ledru searches fruitlessly for Bob to convince him to abandon his plan. He reluctantly leads a convoy of armed police to the casino.

Bob enters the casino to check on things. The plan is that, unless he signals them otherwise, his team will burst in at 5:00 a.m. and rob the safe at gunpoint. He had promised Roger that he would not gamble until after the heist was over, but, after wandering around for a while, he cannot resist placing a bet. He has an incredible run of good luck, first at roulette, then at chemin de fer, and loses track of the time. Just before 5:00, he finally looks at his watch. He orders the staff to cash his huge pile of chips and hurries out the door. The police arrive as Bob's team are walking toward the casino, and a shootout ensues; Paolo is shot. Bob comes upon the aftermath and holds Paolo as he dies. He and Roger are handcuffed and put into Ledru's car, and Bob's winnings are put in the trunk. Ledru says Bob will probably only spend three years in prison, but Roger says that, with a good lawyer, he will get acquitted. Bob quips that he may even sue for damages.

== Principal cast ==
- Roger Duchesne as Bob Montagné
- Isabelle Corey as Anne
- Daniel Cauchy as Paolo
- Guy Decomble as Police Commissaire Ledru
- André Garet as Roger
- Gérard Buhr as Marc
- Claude Cerval as Jean
- Colette Fleury as Suzanne
- René Havard as Police Inspector Morin
- Simone Paris as Yvonne
- Howard Vernon as McKimmie

The director, Jean-Pierre Melville, narrates the film.

== Production ==
The film was shot on location in Place Pigalle, Pigalle, Montmartre, Paris, and Deauville, with two interiors filmed at Melville's own Studios Jenner. According to an interview, the film cost 17.5 million French francs to produce, though a CNC (Centre national du cinéma et de l'image animée) censorship file includes an estimate of 32 million French francs.

== Cinematography ==
This film was shot by a frequent collaborator of Jean-Pierre Melville, Henri Decaë, who was the cinematographer on films such as Elevator to the Gallows (1958), The Boys from Brazil (1978) and The Red Circle (1970). He previously shot Le silence de la mer (1949) with Melville and later was cinematographer on Melville's Le Samouraï (1967). They eventually split ways due to creative differences, but Melville once said of Decaë he "exactly shar[ed] my tastes for all things cinema."

With films such as Elevator to the Gallows (1958), Henri Decaë first established his trademark that followed him through his career, which is the use of natural lighting. Much in the way he lit Jeanne Moreau in Elevator to the Gallows "with only the available light from shop windows and neon signs." Due to this use of heavily stylized light, many critics have traced a connection to the American film noir movement.

This film was influential on the French New Wave Movement for many reasons, including visual style. This can be attributed to the fact that Henri Decaë's cinematography caught the attention of Cahiers Du Cinema editors. This secured him a job as cinematographer for influential New Wave films like François Truffaut's The 400 Blows.

== Release ==
Released in Paris on 24 April 1956, Bob le flambeur took in 221,659 admissions in Paris and 716,920 admissions in France as a whole, and was Melville's lowest-grossing film at that point in his career.

It was shown as part of the 1981 New York Film Festival at Alice Tully Hall. Bob le Flambeur was not released to theaters in the U.S. until 23 June 1982, at the Cinema Studio 2, in New York.

== Critical reception ==
Vincent Canby, writing for The New York Times in 1981, noted that "Melville's affection for American gangster movies may have never been as engagingly and wittily demonstrated as in Bob le Flambeur, which was only the director's fourth film, made before he had access to the bigger budgets and the bigger stars (Jean-Paul Belmondo, Alain Delon) of his later pictures."

The film received positive reviews when it was re-released by Rialto Pictures in U.S. cinemas in 2001. Roger Ebert added it to his Great Movies list in 2003.

Jean-Pierre Melville is often considered a significant figure in the New Wave film movement, credited with inspiring key elements in the movement through his film Bob le Flambeur (1956). His work notably influenced Jean-Luc Godard's Breathless, which directly references the film when a character claims their friend Bob Montagne is now in prison. The New Wave was a product of the French reimagining of American cinema, and Melville's contributions provided significant inspiration for this innovative and revolutionary approach to filmmaking, which included the use of location shooting, the handheld camera, and the jump cut.

Godard, influenced by Melville's avant-garde style, fully embraced these trends in his filmmaking. Breathless was shot entirely on location, featuring dynamic jump cut editing and utilizing a handheld camera.

Melville understands that in a gangster film, the criminal will ultimately be caught. Bob is less interested in stealing the money itself than in everyone knowing who's robbing the bank. He explains the trope that not all gamblers are lucky, yet the idea of losing a gamble is all to be expected.

On Rotten Tomatoes, the film holds an approval rating of 97%, based on 30 reviews, with an average rating of 8.1/10; the website's critical consensus reads: "Majorly stylish, Bob le Flambeur is a cool homage to American gangster films and the presage to French New Wave mode of seeing."

== Remake and influence ==
The Good Thief, an English-language remake of the film written and directed by Neil Jordan, was released in 2002.

Bob le flambeur also has influenced such films as the two versions of the American film Ocean's Eleven (1960 and 2001) and Paul Thomas Anderson's Hard Eight (1996).
