= Christian Beck (poet) =

Belgian poet

Christian Beck (4 January 1879 in Verviers – 29 February 1916) was a Belgian poet. He was the father of Béatrix Beck.
