= Béatrix Beck =

French writer

- Born: 14 July 1914; Villars-sur-Ollon, Switzerland
- Died: 30 November 2008 (aged 94); Saint-Clair-sur-Epte, France
- Occupation: writer

Béatrix Beck (14 July 1914 – 30 November 2008) was a French writer of Belgian origin.

She was born at Villars-sur-Ollon, Switzerland, the daughter of the poet Christian Beck. After several jobs, she became the secretary of André Gide who encouraged her to write about her experiences, including her mother's suicide, the war, and her poverty. Beck died in Saint-Clair-sur-Epte in 2008.

== Bibliography ==
- 1948 Barny
- 1950 Une mort irrégulière
- 1952 The Passionate Heart - Prix Goncourt, the French title is Léon Morin, prêtre
- 1954 Des accommodements avec le ciel
- 1963 Le muet
- 1967 Cou coupé court toujours
- 1977 L'épouvante l'émerveillement
- 1978 Noli
- 1979 La décharge - Prix du Livre Inter
- 1980 Devancer la nuit
- 1981 Josée dite Nancy
- 1983 Don Juan des forêts
- 1984 L'enfant-chat - Prix litteraire de Trente millions d'amis
- 1986 La prunelle des yeux
- 1988 Stella Corfou
- 1989 Une
- 1990 Grâce
- 1991 Recensement
- 1993 Une Lilliputienne
- 1994 Vulgaires vies
- 1994 Moi ou autres (nouvelles)
- 1996 Prénoms (nouvelles)
- 1997 Plus loin, mais où
- 1998 Confidences de gargouille
- 2000 La petite Italie (nouvelles)
- 2001 Guidée par le songe (nouvelles)
- Contes à l'enfant né coiffé
- La mer intérieure
- La grenouille d'encrier
- Mots couverts (poèmes)
