= Volvo PV 36 Carioca =

Volvo PV36 Carioca
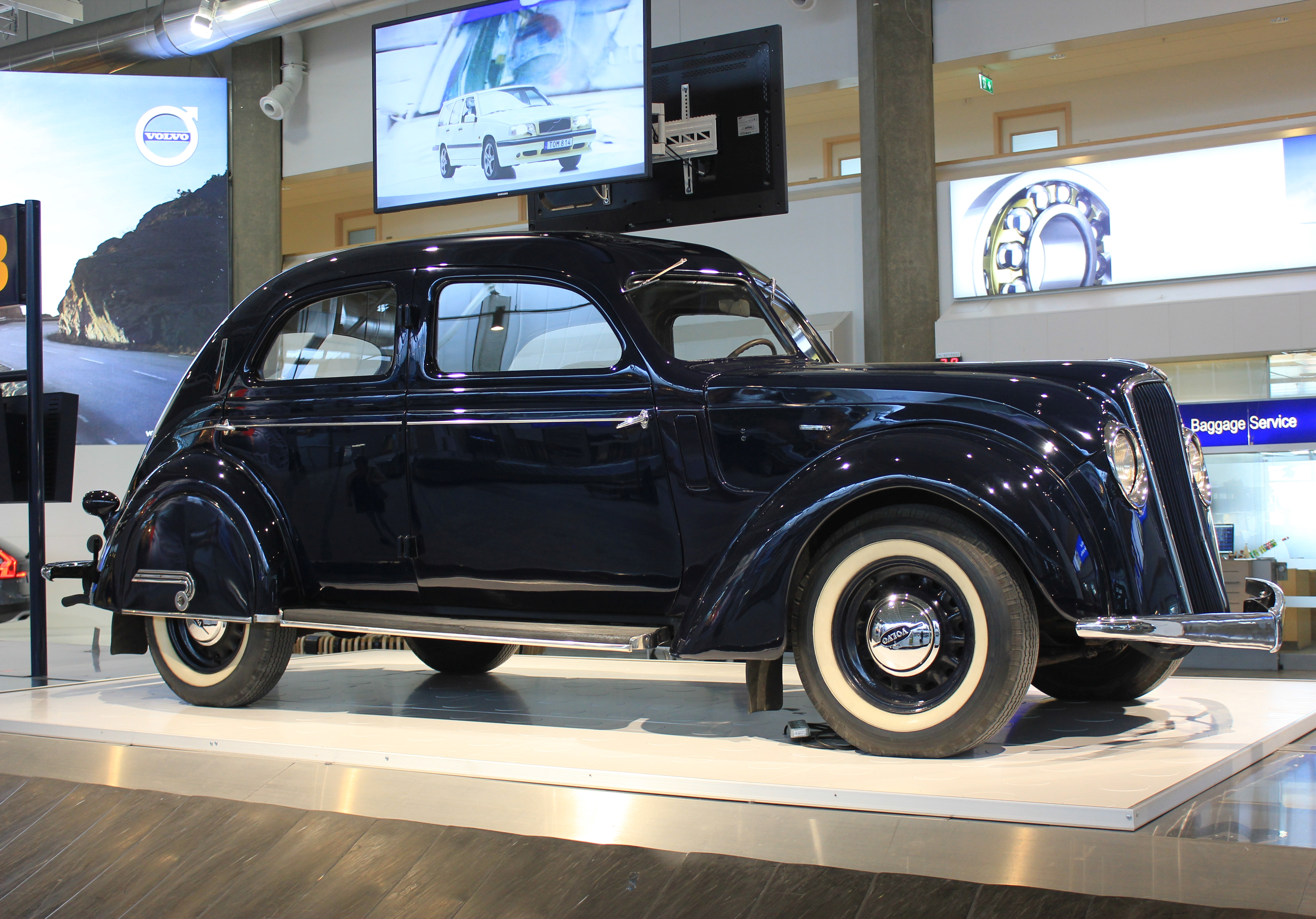

Overview
- Manufacturer: Volvo Cars
- Production: 1935–1938
- Assembly: Sweden: Lundby, Gothenburg
- Designer: Ivan Örnberg

Body and chassis
- Class: Luxury car
- Body style: 4-door saloon
- Layout: Front-engine rear-wheel-drive

Powertrain
- Engine: 3,670 cc (3.7 L) EC I6
- Transmission: 3-speed manual

Dimensions
- Wheelbase: 2,950 mm (116.1 in)
- Length: 5,000 mm (196.9 in)
- Curb weight: 1,660 kg (3,659.7 lb)

Chronology
- Successor: Volvo PV51

The Volvo PV 36 Carioca is a luxury car manufactured by Volvo Cars between 1935 and 1938. The word Carioca describes someone from Rio de Janeiro, Brazil, and was also the name of a dance that was fashionable in Sweden at the time when the car was introduced.

Visually the car was styled similarly to the then strikingly modern Chrysler Airflow and Hupmobile Model J Aero-dynamic. Volvo styling was heavily influenced by North American auto-design trends in the 1930s and 1940s, many of the company's senior engineers having previously worked in the US Auto-industry.

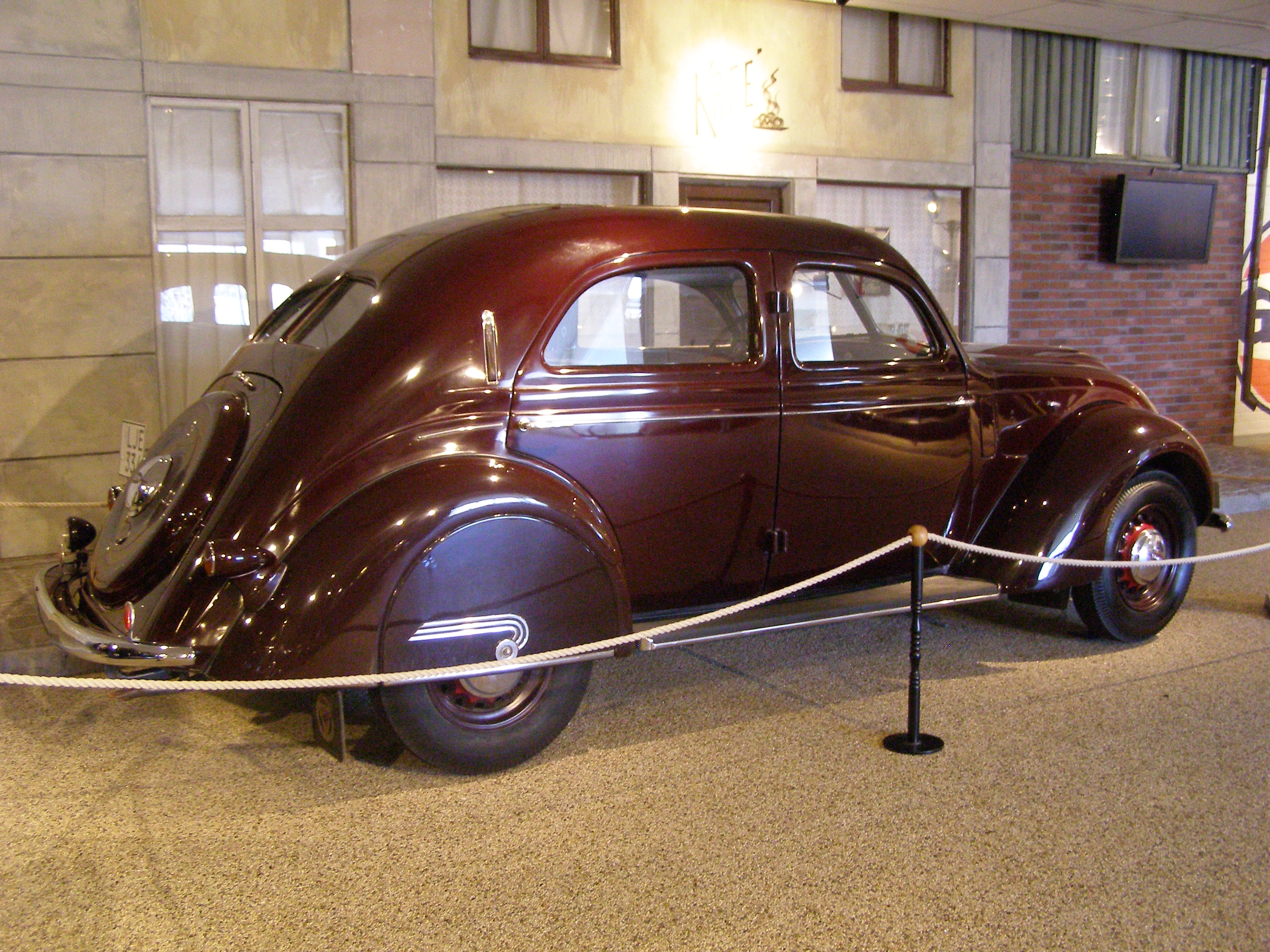
Volvo PV 36 Carioca rear view

The PV36 was the first Volvo to offer an independent front suspension, but the car used the same side-valve engine as the traditional Volvo cars that were still produced alongside the modern Carioca. The PV36 was an expensive car, with a price at 8,500 kronor and Volvo didn't build more than 500 cars. The last one wasn't sold until 1938.
