= Lars Magnus Ericsson =

Swedish inventor

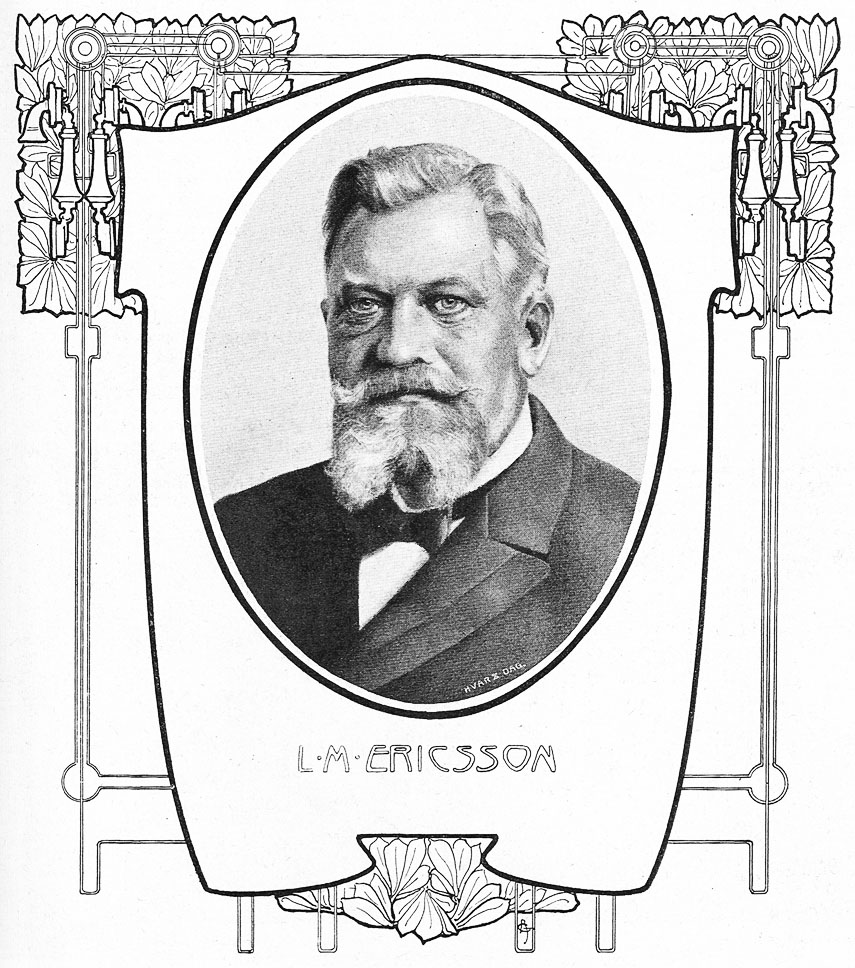
- Born: 5 May 1846; Värmskog, Sweden–Norway
- Died: 17 December 1926 (aged 80); Botkyrka, Sweden
- Occupations: Inventor, entrepreneur
- Known for: Founder of telephone equipment manufacturer Ericsson

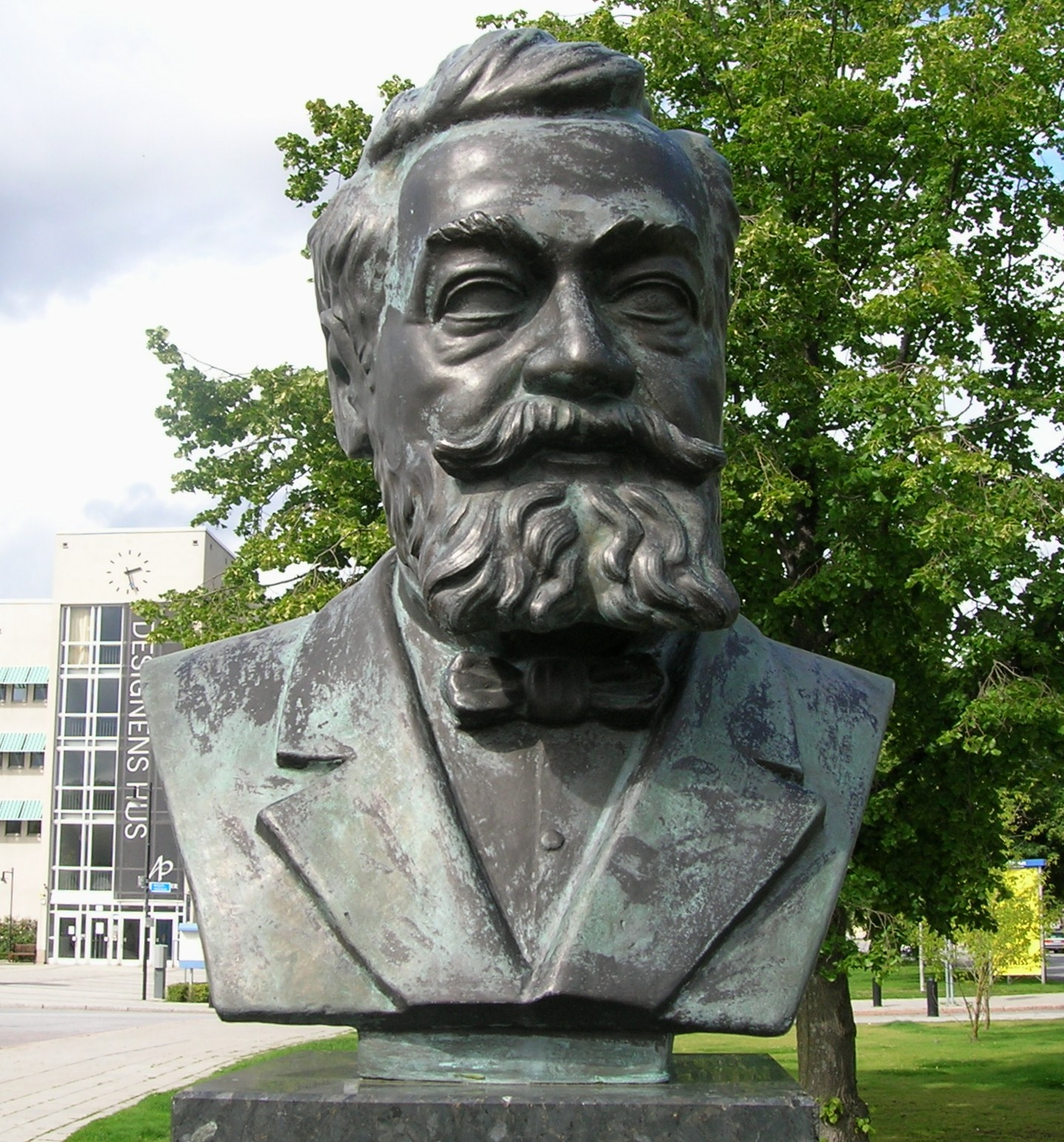
Bust of L. M. Ericsson at Telefonplan in Stockholm

Lars Magnus Ericsson (Swedish pronunciation: [lɑːʂ ˈmǎŋːnɵs ˈêːrɪkˌsɔn]; 5 May 1846 – 17 December 1926) was a Swedish inventor, entrepreneur and founder of telephone equipment manufacturer Ericsson (incorporated as Telefonaktiebolaget LM Ericsson).

== Early life ==
Lars Magnus was born in Värmskog, Värmland, and grew up in the small village of Vegerbol located between Karlstad and Arvika. At the age of 12, Ericsson's father died forcing him to seek work as a miner. He worked until he had enough money to leave the village and move to Stockholm in 1867. He then worked for six years for an instrument maker named Öllers & Co. who mainly created telegraph equipment. Because of his skills, he was given two state scholarships to study instrument making abroad between 1872 and 1875. One of the companies he worked at was Siemens & Halske.

== Career ==
Upon his return to Sweden in 1876, he founded a small mechanical workshop together with his friend Carl Johan Andersson who had also worked at Öllers & Co.. This workshop was actually a former kitchen of some 13 m^{2} situated at Drottninggatan 15 in the most central part of Stockholm. Here, he started a telephone company by analyzing Bell company and Siemens telephones and creating his own copies in their image. It was not until they started cooperating with Henrik Tore Cedergren in 1883 that the company would start to grow into the Ericsson corporation.

In the year 1900 Lars Magnus retired from Ericsson at the age of 54. He kept his shares in the company until 1905 and then sold them all.

He is said to have been a demanding person, and disliked any direct publicity about his personality and did not wish to be idolized. He was, however, deeply respected by his employees. He was always a skeptic and cautious in business. He was also somewhat opposed to patents, as many of the products he made would not have been possible to do if the patent legislation had been overly effective. When his phones were copied by Norwegian companies he did not care, as his phones had in turn been largely copied from Siemens. He initially did not believe in a mass market for telephones, and saw it as a toy for the leisure class.

== Personal life ==
Ericsson married Hilda Simonsson in 1878. They had four children together: Johan (1879–1881), Gustaf (1880–1965), Anna (1881–1967) and Lars Magnus Jr. "Lalle" (1892–1921). When their daughter Anna was only six weeks old, their eldest son Johan died from pulmonary oedema. The couple also lost their son Lalle at a young age to tuberculosis.

== Death ==
After his death in 1926, he was buried at Hågelby gård in Botkyrka. At his explicit request, there is no headstone marking his grave.

== See also ==
- Simone Giertz
