= Tulegatan =

Street in Vasastan, Stockholm, Sweden

Coordinates: 59°20′40″N 18°03′37″E

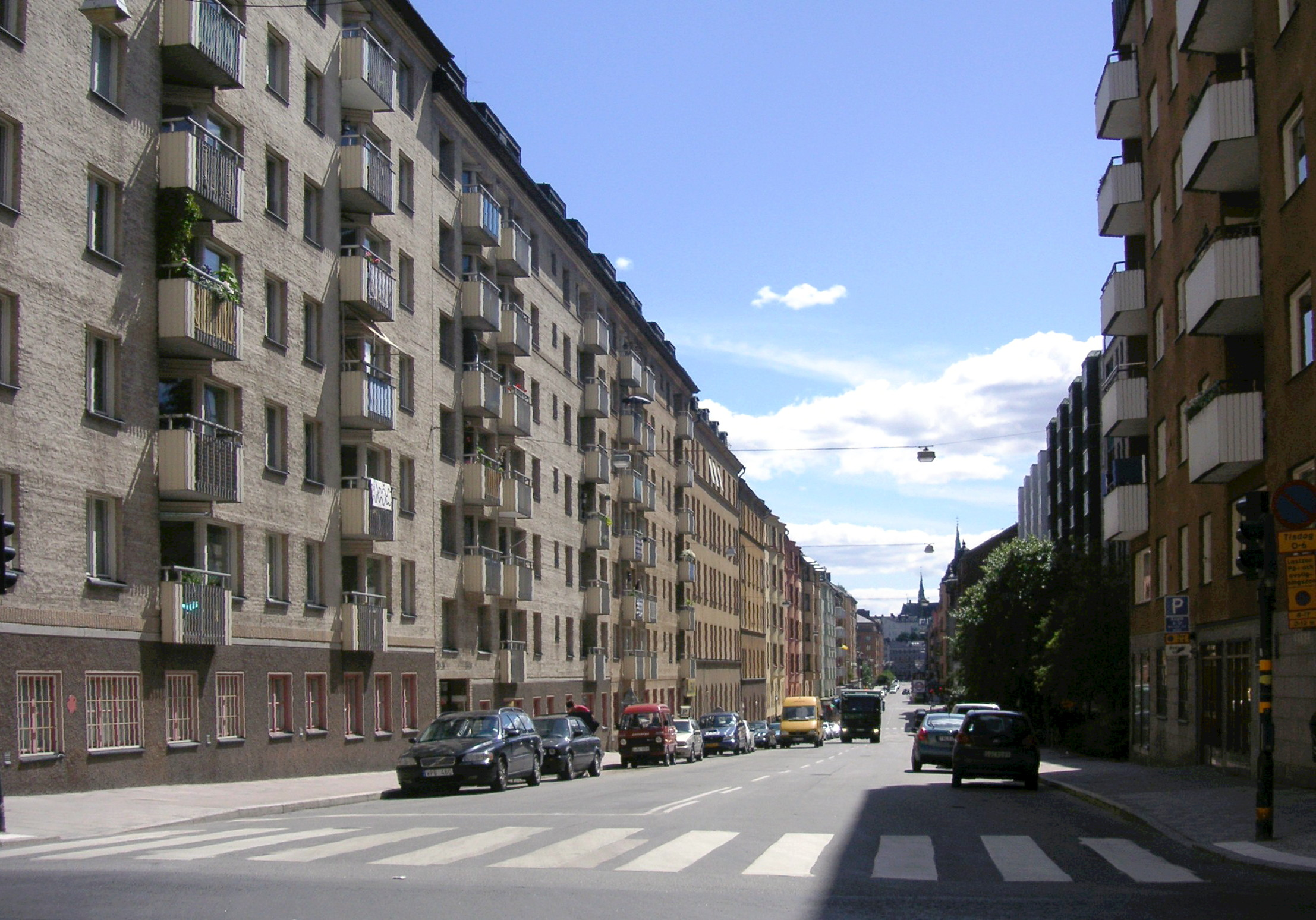
Tulegatan

Tulegatan is a street in Stockholm. It is located in the district of Vasastaden.
