= Le Silence de la mer (1949 film) =

1949 French film

Le silence de la mer
- French theatrical release poster
- Directed by: Jean-Pierre Melville
- Screenplay by: Jean-Pierre Melville
- Based on: Le Silence de la mer<brStefania Sandrelli>(1942 novella) by Vercors
- Produced by: Pierre Braunberger
- Starring: Howard Vernon; Nicole Stéphane; Jean-Marie Robain
- Cinematography: Henri Decaë
- Edited by: Jean-Pierre Melville; Henri Decaë
- Music by: Edgar Bischoff
- Production companies: Melville Productions; Société du Cinéma Le Panthéon; O.G.C. - Organisation Générale Cinématographique
- Distributed by: Gaumont
- Release date: 22 April 1949 (Paris)
- Running time: 86 minutes
- Country: France
- Languages: French; German

Le Silence de la mer (French pronunciation: [lə silɑ̃s də la mɛʁ], lit. 'The silence of the sea') is a 1949 French war drama film written and directed by Jean-Pierre Melville, in his directorial debut. Adapted from the 1942 novella of the same name written by Vercors (the pen name of Jean Bruller). Set during the Second World War in occupied France, the story concerns the relationship of a Frenchman and his niece with a German lieutenant who is billetted in their house.

== Plot ==
In occupied France early in 1941, when Werner von Ebrennac, a German Wehrmacht lieutenant with a limp, is billetted in a house in a small village that a retired man shares with his adult niece, the pair, without having to discuss it, agree never to speak to or acknowledge the unwanted intruder. Most nights as the uncle smokes his pipe and the niece does some sewing by the fire, the officer, at first dressed in his uniform and later in civilian clothes, comes to warm himself and politely engages them in a brief one-sided conversation. Speaking good French, he reveals that he is an unmarried composer and this is the first time he has been to France, though he has long studied and admired French literature and culture, which he seems to prefer to his own (except regarding music). Loyal to Hitler, he hopes the Nazi invasion will bring about a lasting "marriage" between France and Germany that will benefit everyone, a point he comes back to day after day and illustrates by referencing Beauty and the Beast (Germany being the beast, who only needs France to accept it to turn into a prince). Werner often looks warmly at the niece as he extols the virtues of France; she remains obdurately silent, but occasionally betrays her growing feelings by a faint quiver of her fingers.

Werner gets some leave in the spring and spends two weeks in Paris. When he returns to the village, the uncle and niece do not see him for over a week. Finally, one night he knocks at the door and does not enter until the uncle, breaking his silence, invites the man in. Once more wearing his uniform, Werner tells his hosts about how his excitement to see Paris was undercut by the presence of the occupying forces and finally turned to disillusionment and despair once he learned about the concentration camps and was told by a group of fanatic German officers, including an old friend, that the Nazi plan is to destroy the French spirit and culture and subjugate France to Germany forever. Stopping short of urging the uncle and niece to rebel, Werner announces that he requested a transfer to the front, and he is leaving in the morning. When he says "adieu", the niece breaks her silence to whisper "adieu" in return.

The next day, the uncle sets out a quotation from Anatole France for Werner: "Il est beau qu'un soldat désobéisse à des ordres criminels" ("It is a fine thing when a soldier disobeys a criminal order"). Werner reads it, exchanges glances with the uncle, and leaves. The niece and her uncle eat lunch in silence.

== Cast ==
- Howard Vernon as Werner von Ebrennac
- Nicole Stéphane as The Niece
- Jean-Marie Robain as The Uncle
- Ami Aaröe as Werner's fiancée
- Denis Sadier as Werner's friend and SS officer
- Heim as German officer
- Max Fromm as German officer
- Roger Rudel as German officer
- Max Hermann as German officer
- Claude Vernier as German officer
- Georges Patrix
- Dietrich Kandler
- Henri Cavalier

== Release ==
Shot in 1947, the film was released by Gaumont in Paris on 22 April, 1949. It took in 464,032 admissions in Paris and 1,371,687 admissions in France as a whole.
