= Jean-Pierre Melville =

French filmmaker and actor (1917–1973)

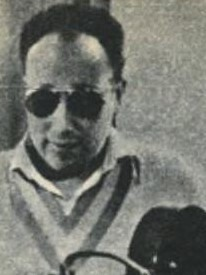
- Born: Jean-Pierre Grumbach; 20 October 1917; Paris, France
- Died: 2 August 1973 (aged 55); Paris, France
- Burial place: Cimetière parisien de Pantin
- Occupations: Filmmaker; screenwriter; actor
- Years active: 1946–1973
- Spouse: Florence Melville

Jean-Pierre Grumbach (20 October 1917 – 2 August 1973), known professionally as Jean-Pierre Melville (French: [ʒɑ̃ pjɛʁ mɛlvil]), was a French filmmaker. Considered a spiritual godfather of the French New Wave, he was one of the first fully-independent French filmmakers to achieve commercial and critical success. His works include the crime dramas Bob le flambeur (1956), Le Doulos (1962), Le Samouraï (1967), and Le Cercle Rouge (1970), and the war films Le Silence de la mer (1949) and Army of Shadows (1969).

Melville's subject matter and approach to film making was influenced by his service in the French Resistance during World War II, during which he adopted the nom de guerre (pseudonym) 'Melville' as a tribute to his favorite American author Herman Melville. He kept it as his stage name once the war was over.

His sparse, existentialist but stylish approach to film noir and later neo-noir films, many of them crime dramas, have been highly influential to future generations of filmmakers. Roger Ebert appraised him as "one of the greatest directors."

== Biography ==
=== Early years ===
Jean-Pierre Grumbach was born in 1917 in Paris, the son of Alsatian Jewish parents Berthe and Jules Grumbach. His father was a rag merchant; the family lived in the ninth arrondissement of Paris. His eldest brother Jacques wrote for the Socialist Party weekly Le Populaire.

Grumbach left school at 17 working as a courier and then a wedding photographer. In 1937, he joined the Communist Party, but left in 1939 over the Molotov-Ribbentrop Pact.

=== World War II and resistance activity ===
After the fall of France in 1940 during World War II, during which he was evacuated from Dunkirk as a soldier in the French Army, Grumbach entered the French Resistance to oppose the German Nazis who occupied the country. He adopted the nom de guerre 'Melville' after the American author Herman Melville, a favourite of his. His brother Jacques and his sister Janine also joined the Resistance.

In 1942, both Jean-Pierre and Jacques crossed the Pyrenees and headed for neutral Spain where they would then try to reach Britain and the Free French Army. They crossed separately several weeks apart. Jacques was carrying money intended for de Gaulle; he was shot dead and robbed by his guide. Jean-Pierre did not find out that his brother had been killed until the war ended. Melville served in the Free French Army for two years, mainly in the artillery. He and his unit were sent to Italy and Melville fought at the Battle of Monte Cassino.

=== Filmmaking career ===
When he returned from the war, he applied for a license to become an assistant director but was refused. Without this support, he decided to direct his films by his own means, and continued to use Melville as his stage name. He became an independent filmmaker and owned his own studio, rue Jenner, in Paris 13ème. On 29 June 1967, the studio and Melville's apartment burnt down. His personal archive of photographs and scripts was destroyed.

He became well known for his minimalist film noir, such as Le Doulos (1962), Le Samouraï (1967) and Le Cercle rouge (1970), starring major actors such as Alain Delon (probably the definitive "Melvillian" actor), Jean-Paul Belmondo and Lino Ventura. Influenced by American cinema, especially gangster films of the 1930s and 1940s, he used accessories such as weapons, clothes (trench coats), and fedora hats, to shape a characteristic look in his movies. He also displayed an interest in Eastern philosophies and martial traditions, as demonstrated in Le Samouraï and Le Cercle rouge. He self-described his style to André S. Labarthe as "nostalgic", while many commentators have noted its existentialist overtones.

Melville ultimately became so identified with the style that The New Yorker's Anthony Lane wrote the following about a 2017 retrospective of his films:

This is how you should attend the forthcoming retrospective of Jean-Pierre Melville movies at Film Forum: Tell nobody what you are doing. Even your loved ones—especially your loved ones—must be kept in the dark. If it comes to a choice between smoking and talking, smoke. Dress well but without ostentation. Wear a raincoat, buttoned and belted, regardless of whether there is rain. Any revolver should be kept, until you need it, in the pocket of the coat. Finally, before you leave home, put your hat on. If you don't have a hat, you can't go.

In 1963, he was invited as one of the jury at the 13th Berlin International Film Festival.

For several years, he sat on the executive board of the French film classification board, the Commission de classification des œuvres cinématographiques, of the Centre national du cinéma et de l'image animée (CNC).

== Personal life ==
Melville was married to his wife, Florence, from 1952 until his death. She worked as a producer on Two Men in Manhattan.

Although a friend of left-wing icons such as Jean-Luc Godard and Yves Montand, Melville referred to his politics as "right-wing anarchist" and "extreme individualist".

Melville was noted for wearing a trench coat, Ray-Ban sunglasses, and a Stetson hat, loving cats, and eating Nestlé Nuts candy bars.

=== Death ===
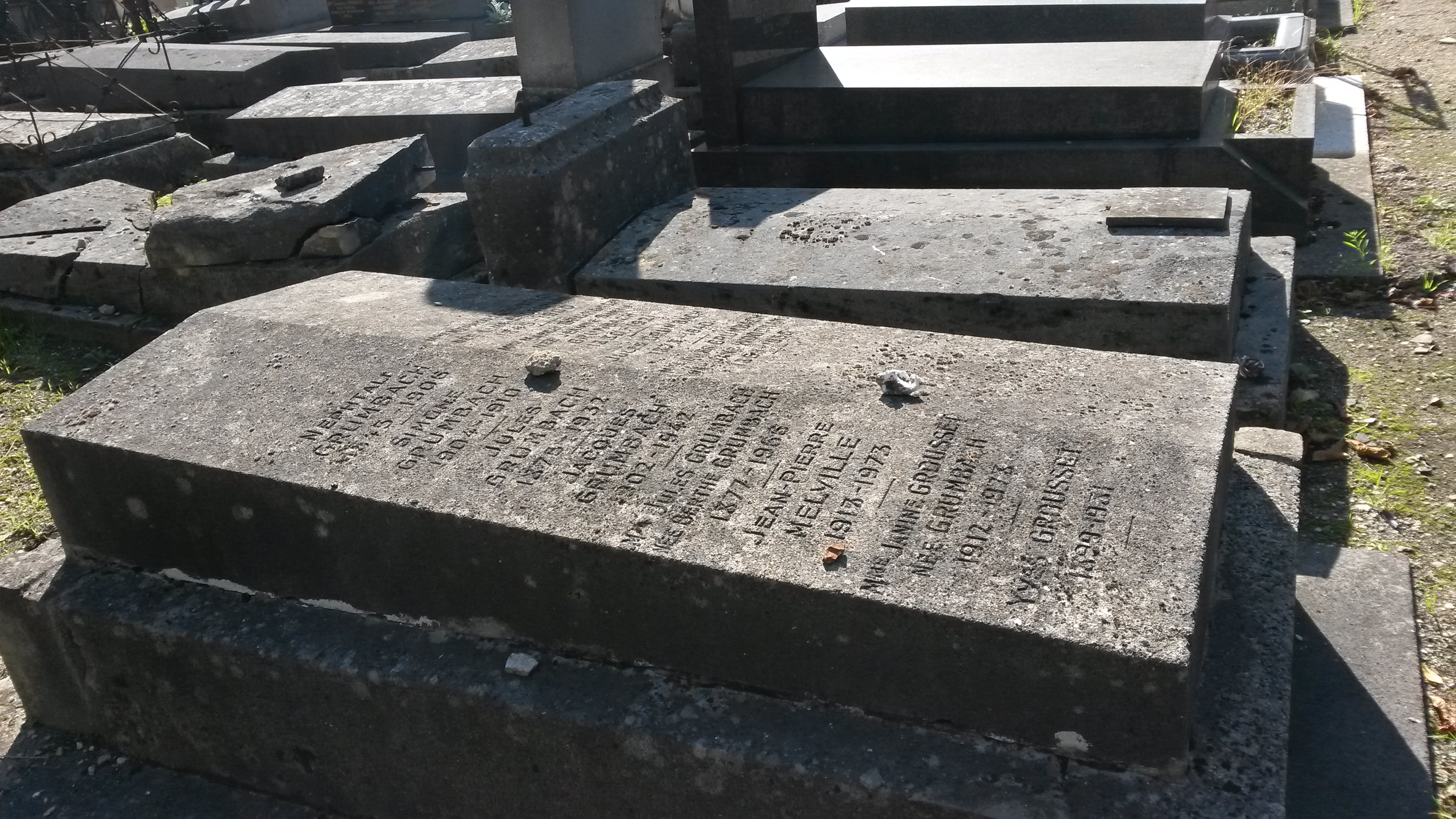
Melville's grave at a cemetery in Pantin

Melville died on 2 August 1973 while dining with writer Philippe Labro at the Hôtel PLM Saint-Jacques restaurant in Paris; the cause of death has been variously given as a heart attack or a ruptured aneurysm. He was 55 years old and was writing his next film, Contre-enquête, a spy thriller for producer Jacques-Éric Strauss with Yves Montand in the lead. Melville apparently wrote the first 200 shots for the film. After Melville's death, Labro took over the project, hoping to finish writing and direct it but he eventually dropped it to film Le hasard et la violence (1974), also starring Montand and for producer Strauss.

== Influence and legacy ==
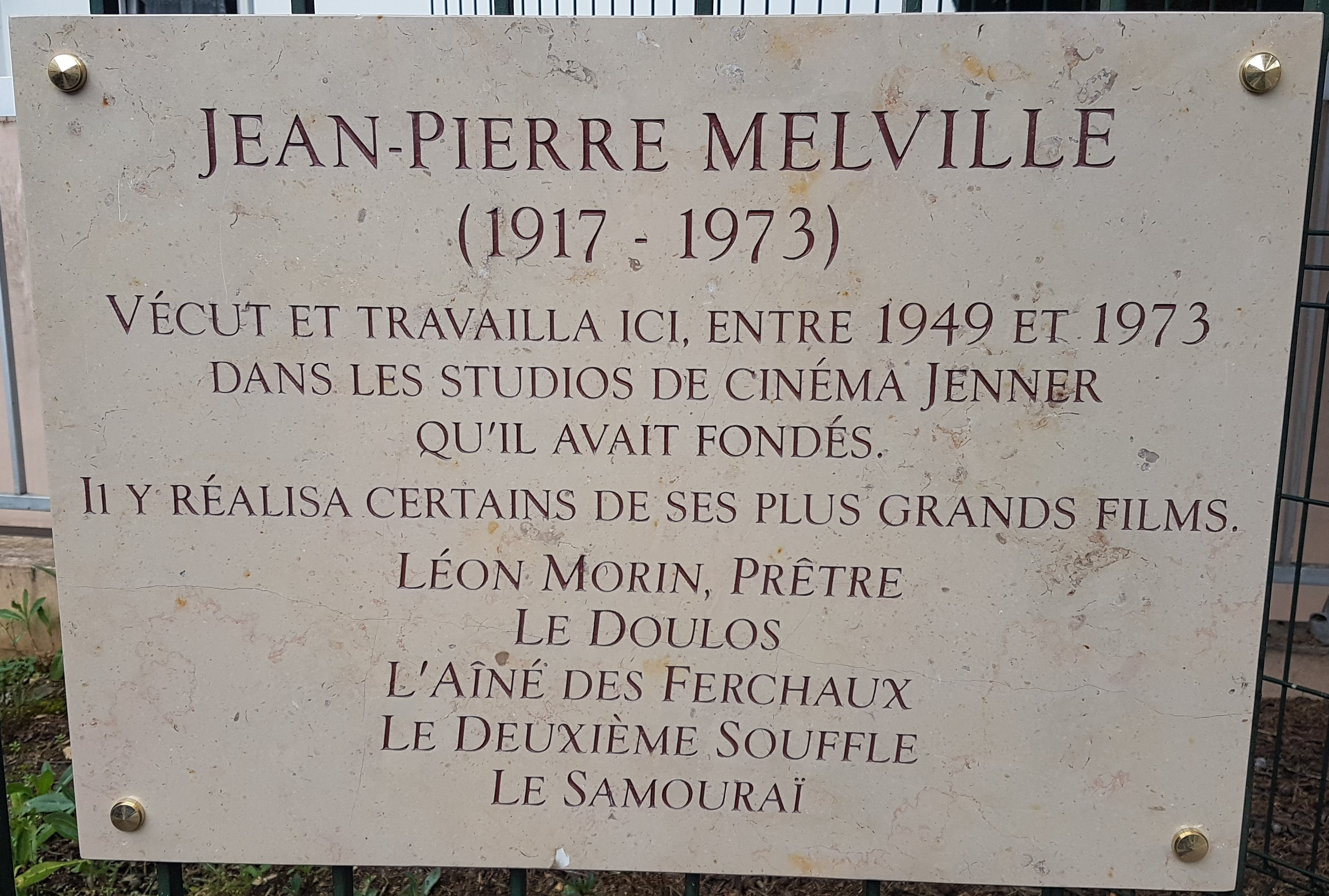
Plaque commemorating Melville

Melville's independence and "reporting" style of film-making (he was one of the first French directors to use real locations regularly) were a major influence on the French New Wave film movement. Jean-Luc Godard used him as a minor character in his seminal New Wave film Breathless. When Godard was having difficulty editing the film, Melville suggested that he just cut directly to the best parts of a shot. Godard was inspired and the film's innovative use of jump cuts have become part of its fame. In an interview, Melville claimed editing was his favorite part of the filmmaking process along with writing.

Melville's approach to the crime film genre emphasized "habit and rules and codes and the consequences of breaking them". He influenced the work of directors Michael Mann and John Woo. Woo called Le Cercle rouge one of his favorite films, and called Melville "a god".

Other directors influenced by Melville include Martin Scorsese, Quentin Tarantino, Walter Hill, Johnnie To, Takeshi Kitano, John Frankenheimer, John Milius, Nicolas Winding Refn, Kim Jee-woon, Hossein Amini, Jim Jarmusch, and Aki Kaurismäki. The John Wick film series contains several nods to Melville's Le Cercle rouge.

=== Code Name Melville ===
Produced in 2008, the 76-minute-long feature documentary Code Name Melville (original French title: Sous le nom de Melville) reveals the importance of Jean-Pierre Melville's experience in the French Resistance during World War II to his approach to film making.

== Filmography ==
=== Feature films ===
Year	Title	Notes
1946	Vingt-quatre Heures de la vie d'un clown	Also producer
1949	Le Silence de la mer	Also producer and editor
1950	Les Enfants terribles	Also producer
1953	When You Read This Letter	
1956	Bob le flambeur	Also producer
1959	Two Men in Manhattan	Also producer and cinematographer
1961	Léon Morin, Priest	
1962	Le Doulos	
1963	Magnet of Doom	
1966	Le deuxième souffle	
1967	Le Samouraï	
1969	Army of Shadows	
1970	Le Cercle Rouge	
1972	Un flic	

=== Acting roles ===
Year	Title	Role
1946	Vingt-quatre Heures de la vie d'un clown	Narrator (voice)
1948	Les Dames du Bois de Boulogne	
1950	Orpheus	
1950	The Glass Castle	Cab Driver
1956	Bob le flambeur	Narrator (voice)
1957	Amour de poche	Commissar
1958	Mimi Pinson	
1959	Two Men in Manhattan	Moreau
1960	Breathless	Parvulesco
1962	Le Signe du Lion	Client
1962	Le Combat dans l'île	Terrorist
1963	Landru	Georges Mandel
