= Fountains of International Expositions =

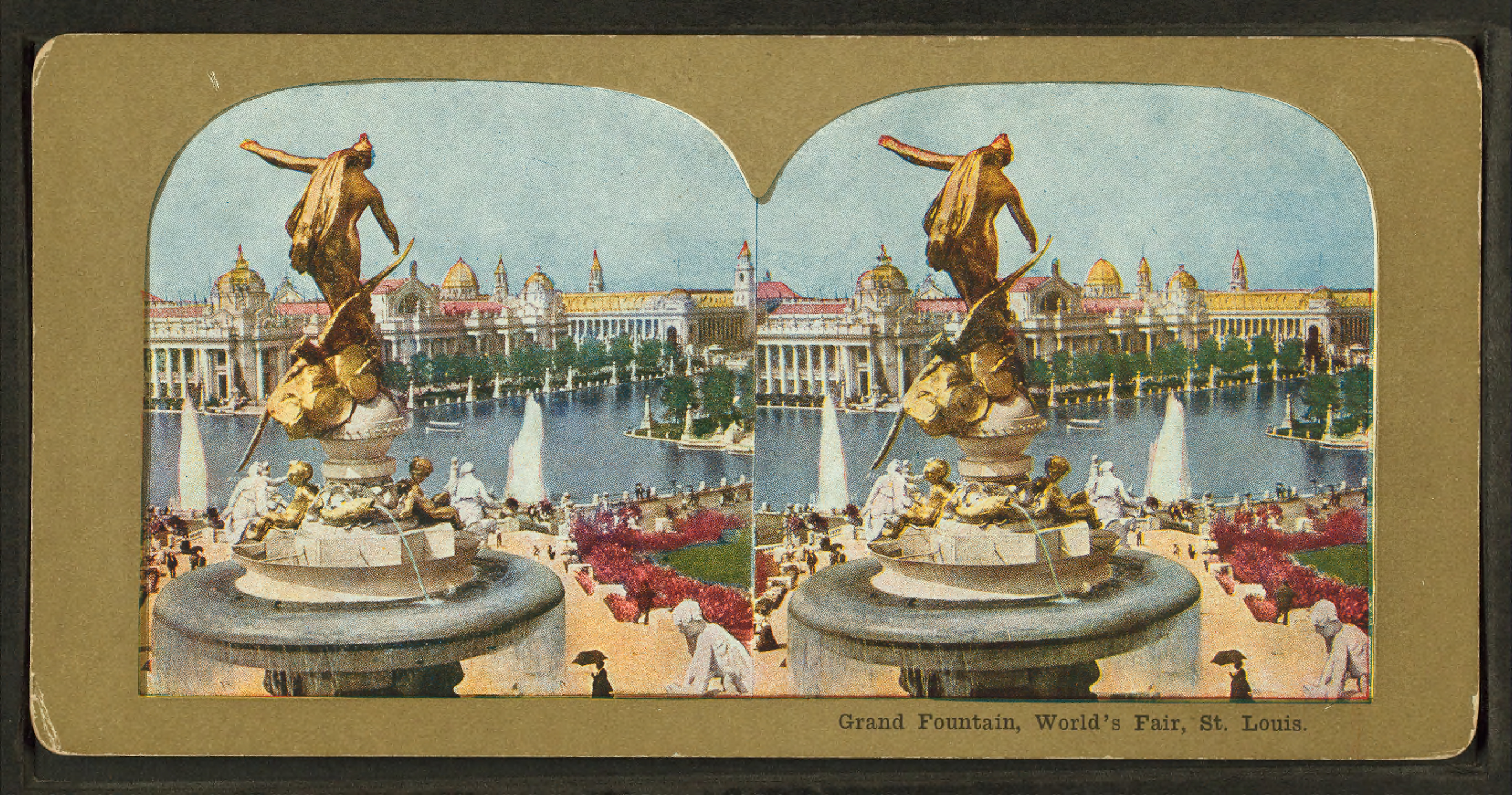
Grand Fountain at the Saint Louis World's Fair (1904)

The Fountains of International Expositions in London, Paris, New York and other cities between 1851 and 1964 combined architecture, technology and theatre. They introduced the first illuminated fountains, the first fountains made with glass and other exotic materials, and the first fountains programmed to perform with music.

== History ==
The Crystal Fountain was designed by Follett Osler, it was the world's first glass fountain, made of four tons of pure crystal glass. It was displayed in the central court of the Crystal Palace of the London Great Exhibition of 1851. It was destroyed by fire, along with the Crystal Palace, in 1936. The Art Journal Illustrated Catalogue of the Great Exhibition wrote in 1851 that the fountain was "perhaps the most striking object in the exhibition; the lightness and beauty, as well as the perfect novelty of the design, have rendered it the theme of admiration with all visitors. The ingenuity with which this has been effected is very perfect; it is supported by bars of iron, which are so completely embedded in the glass shafts, as to be invisible, and in no degree interfering with the purity and crystalline effect of the whole object.

- The 1876 Centennial Exposition, in Philadelphia, celebrating the 100th birthday of the United States, featured the Bartholdi Fountain, made by the sculptor Frédéric Auguste Bartholdi, who later created the Statue of Liberty. Its vasque had a circle of gas lamps which shone on the cascading water, making it one of the first fountains to be illuminated. After the exposition the fountain was purchased by the United States Congress. It is now at the corner of Independence Avenue and First Street, in the United States Botanic Garden, on the grounds of the United States Capitol, in Washington, D.C.

Eight universal expositions took place in Paris between 1855 and 1937, and each included fountains, both for decoration and for sale, which demonstrated the latest in technology and artistic styles. They introduced illuminated fountains, fountains which performed with music, fountains made of glass and concrete, and modern abstract fountains to Paris.

- The Exposition Universelle (1889) which celebrated the 100th anniversary of the French Revolution. featured the Eiffel Tower, and a fountain illuminated by electric lights shining up though the columns of water, a method first developed in England in 1884. The fountains, located in a basin forty meters in diameter, were given color by plates of colored glass inserted over the lamps. The Fountain of Progress gave its show three times each evening, for twenty minutes, with a series of different colours.
- The Exposition Universelle (1900) featured the Temple of Electricity, near the Champs Elysees, which had a series of illuminated fountains in front, with lamps shining blue, white and red light. The innovation of 1900 was a keyboard which allowed changing the colours in rapid succession.
- The Exposition Internationale des Arts Décoratifs et Industriels Modernes (1925). This fair introduced the first fountains made of modern materials and in the modernist style of the 20th century. The fountain by sculptor Gabriel Guevrekian was composed of four triangular basins, colored blue or red, and a fountain of glass in the centre, surrounded by triangles of grass and flowers. It was the first fountain in Paris composed like a cubist painting.

The most original fountain in the exposition was Les Sources et les Rivières de France, made by René Lalique. It was a column of glass five meters high, made up of 128 caryatids of glass, each with a different decoration and size, each spraying a thin stream of water into the fountain below. At night the column was illuminated from within, and could change color. It was placed on a cross of concrete covered with decorated plates of glass, and in an octagonal basin also decorated with colored and black tiles of glass.

- 'The Paris Colonial Exposition of 1931 introduced neon lights and the indirect outdoor lighting of Paris buildings, and featured eight different illuminated fountains.
- The Théâtre d'eau, or water theater, located on one side of the lake, covering an arc of a circle of about 80 meters, created a performance of dancing water, forming changing bouquets, arches, and curtains of water from its jets and nozzles. It was the ancestor of the modern musical fountain.
- The Pont d'eau was made by jets of water from both sides of Lake Daumesnil, which formed an illuminated water "bridge" forty meters long and six meters wide.
- The Exposition Internationale des Arts et Techniques dans la Vie Moderne (1937) had fountains on both sides of the Seine, at the Trocadéro and on the Champ de Mars. Eight water jets were mounted on pontoons to form arches of water twenty meters long. and 174 submerged fountains were placed under the river surface. The choreography of the fountains was combined with light, and, for the first time, with music, amplified from loudspeakers from eleven rafts anchored in the river. The music featured compositions by the leading modern composers of the period, including Igor Stravinsky, Darius Milhaud, and Arthur Honegger.

The cascades, fountains and basins of the Jardins du Trocadéro, originally built for the 1878 exposition, were completely rebuilt for the 1937 exposition. The main feature was a long basin, or water mirror, with twelve fountain creating columns of water 12 meters high; twenty four smaller fountains four meters high; and ten arches of water. At one end, facing the Seine, were twenty powerful water cannon, able to project a jet of water fifty meters. Above the long basin were two smaller basins, linked with the lower basin by cascades flanked by 32 sprays of water four meter high, in vasques. These fountains are the only exposition fountains which still exist today, and still function as they did.

The exhibit also featured two more unusual fountains; a fountain in the Spanish pavilion by the sculptor Alexander Calder, the Fontaine de Mercure, where a small metal structure created a flow of mercury, and a fountain of wine, imitating one once created for Louis XIV at Versailles.

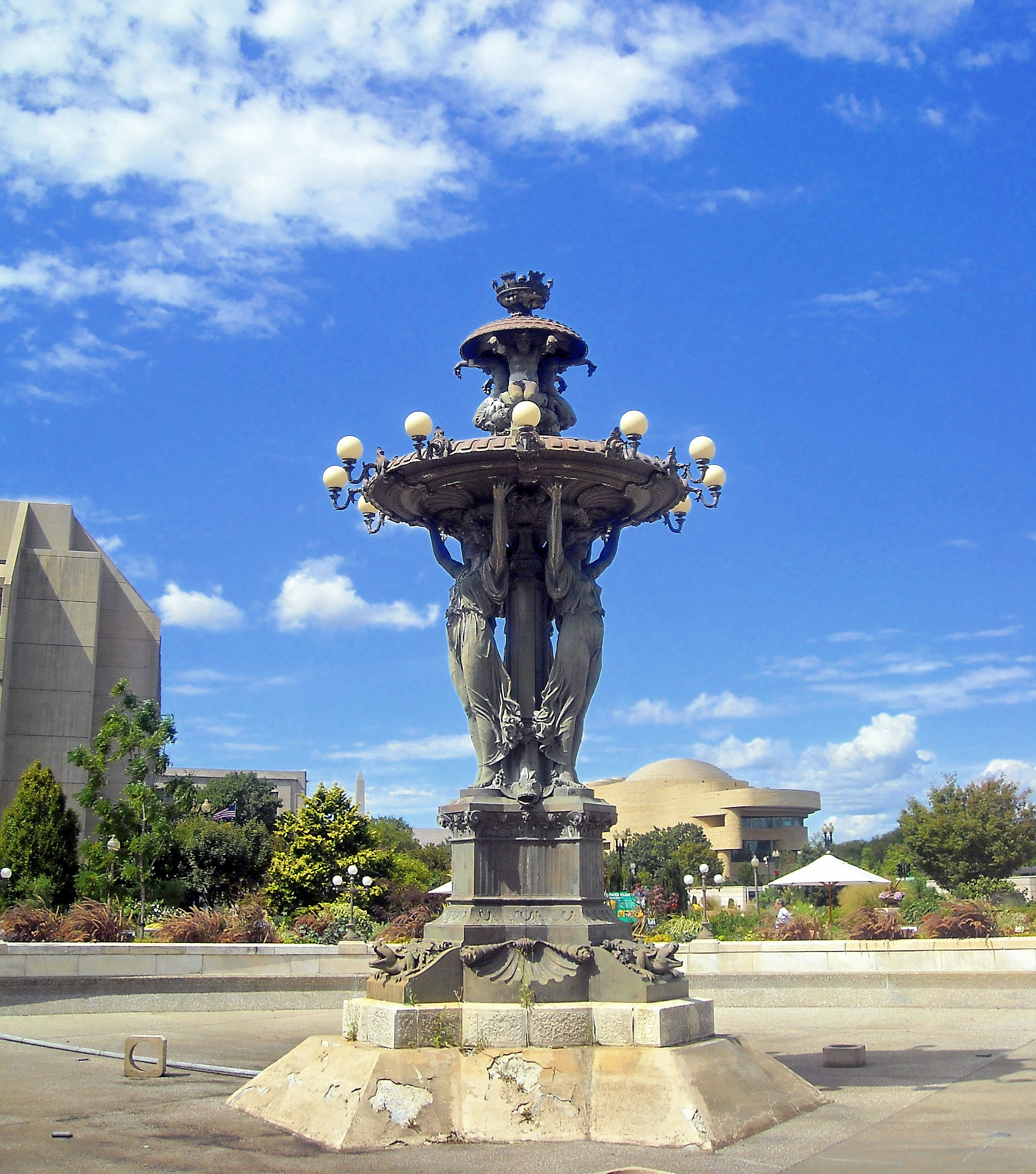
The Bartholdi Fountain from the Philadelphia Bicentennial Exposition of 1876, now in Washington D.C. Its sculptor later made the Statue of Liberty

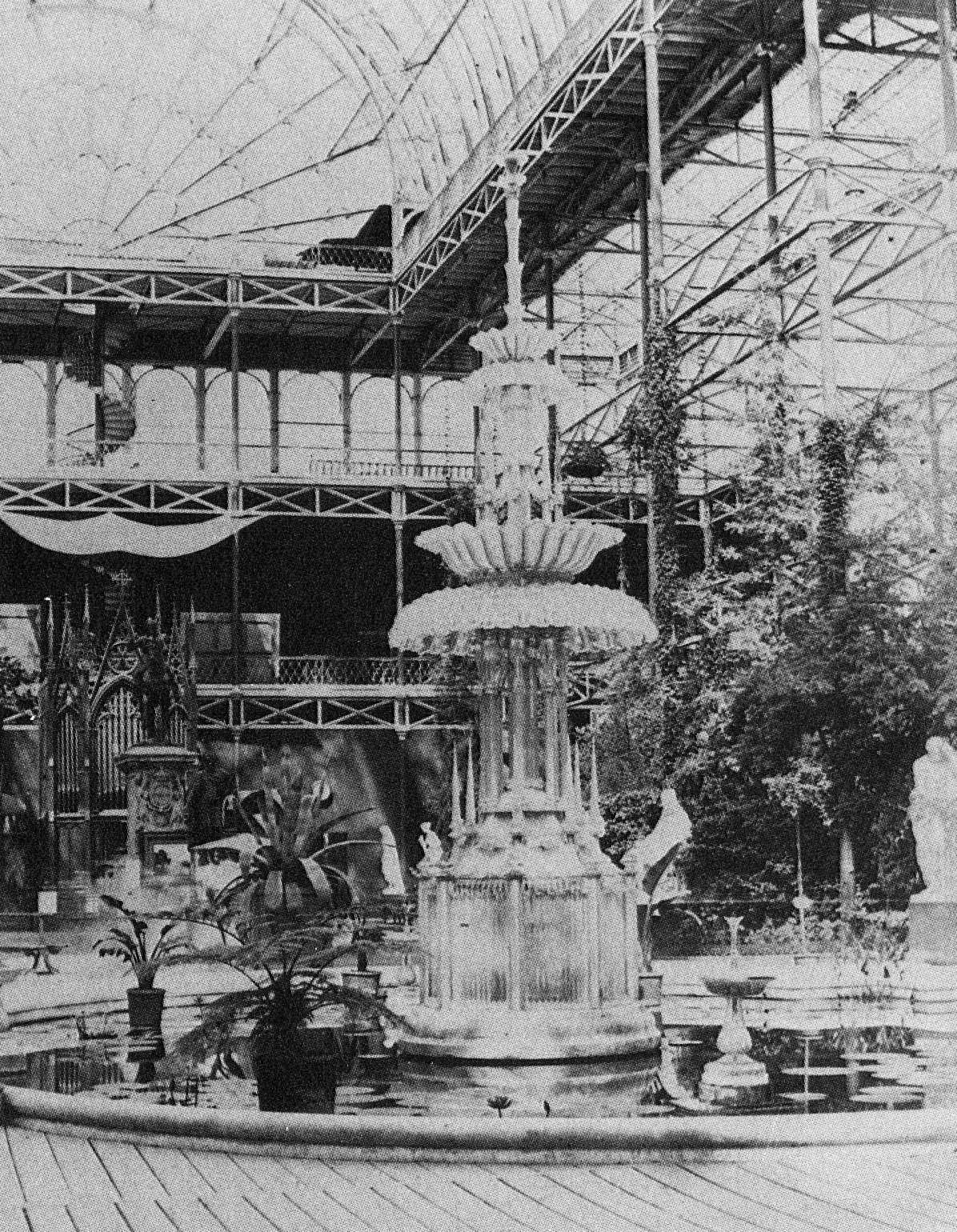
The Crystal Fountain, and indoor fountain at the Crystal Palace, London Great Exhibition of 1851.

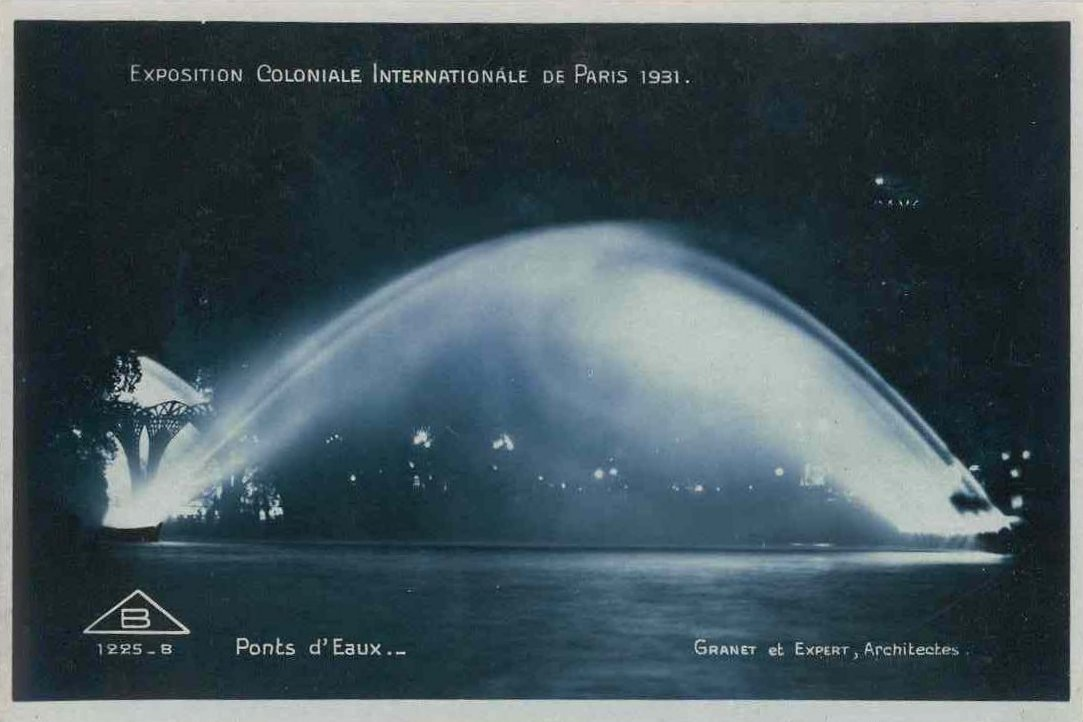
The "Pont d'eau" from the 1931 Paris Colonial Exhibit, created a "bridge" of water forty meters long and six meters wide.

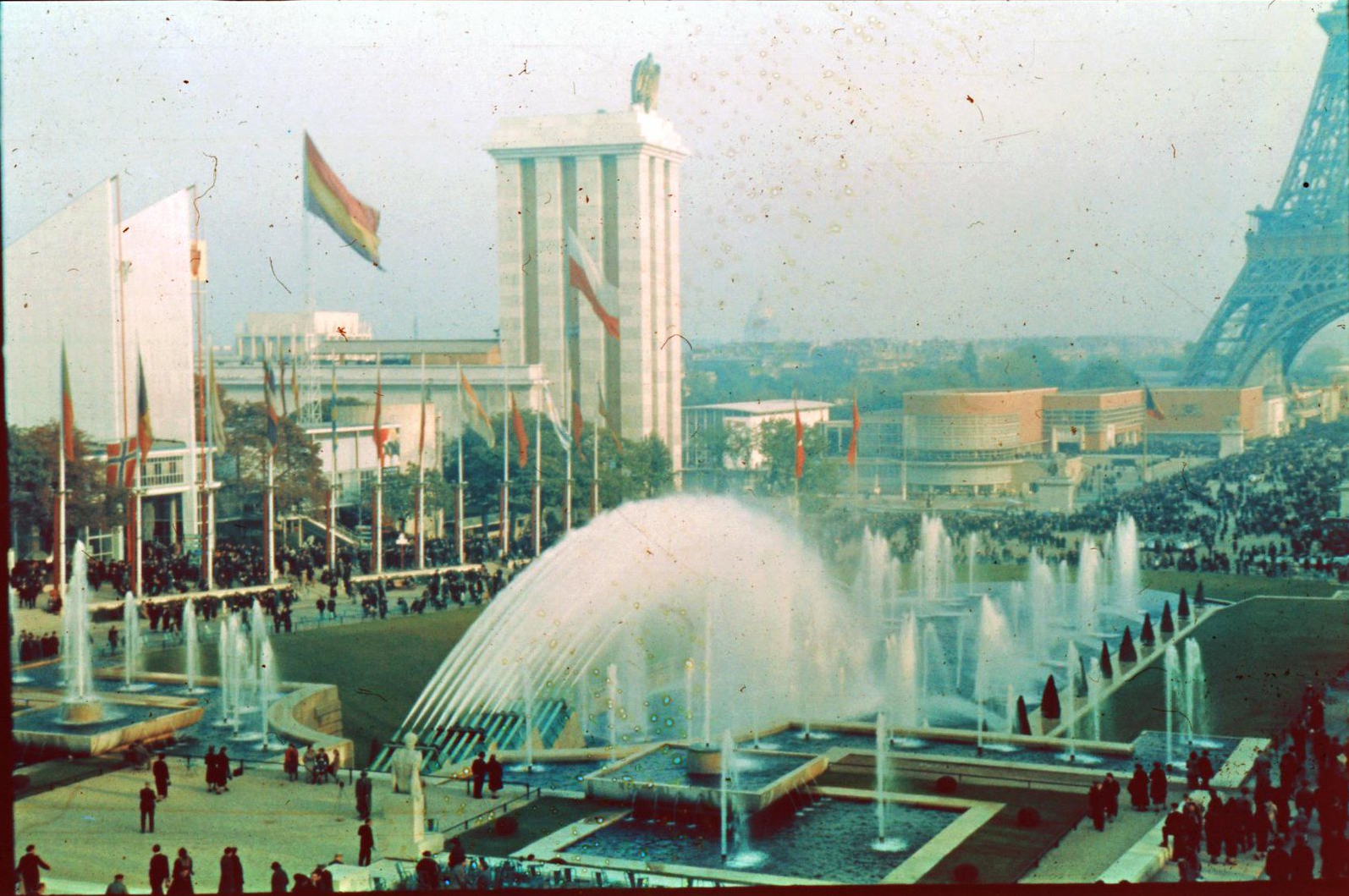
The battery of water cannon at the World Expo in Paris (1937).

== Bibliography ==
- Paris et ses Fontaines, del la Renaissance a nos jours, edited by beatrice de Andia, Dominique Massounie, Pauline Prevost-Marcilhacy and Daniel Rabreau, from the Collection Paris et son Patrimoine, Paris, 1995.
- Marilyn Symmes (editor), Fountains-Splash and Spectacle- Water and Design from the Renaissance to the Present. Thames and Hudson, in cooperation with the Cooper-Hewitt National Design Museum of the Smithsonian Institution. (1998).
