= The Blood of a Poet =

1932 film

- DVD cover
- Directed by: Jean Cocteau
- Written by: Jean Cocteau
- Produced by: Charles de Noailles
- Starring: Enrique Riveros; Lee Miller; Pauline Carton; Odette Talazac; Féral Benga; Jean Desbordes
- Cinematography: Georges Périnal
- Edited by: Jean Cocteau
- Music by: Georges Auric
- Distributed by: Tamasa Distribution; The Criterion Collection
- Release date: 20 January 1932
- Running time: 55 minutes
- Country: France
- Language: French

The Blood of a Poet (French: Le Sang d'un poète, pronounced [lə sɑ̃ dœ̃ pɔɛt]) is a 1932 avant-garde film directed by Jean Cocteau, financed by Charles de Noailles and starring Enrique Riveros, a Chilean actor who had a successful career in European films. Photographer Lee Miller made her only film appearance in this movie, which features an appearance by the famed aerialist Barbette. It is the first part of The Orphic Trilogy, which is continued in Orphée (1950) and concludes with Testament of Orpheus (1960).

== Plot ==
The Blood of a Poet is divided into four sections. In section one, an artist sketches a face and is startled when its mouth starts moving. He rubs out the mouth, only to discover that it has transferred to the palm of his hand. After experimenting with the hand for a while and falling asleep, the artist awakens and places the mouth over the mouth of a female statue.

In section two, the statue speaks to the artist, cajoling him into passing through a mirror. The mirror transports the artist to a hotel, where he peers through several keyholes, witnessing such people as an opium smoker and a hermaphrodite. The artist is handed a gun and a disembodied voice instructs him in how to shoot himself in the head. He shoots himself but does not die. The artist cries out that he has seen enough and returns through the mirror. He smashes the statue with a mallet.

In section three, some students are having a snowball fight. An older boy throws a snowball at a younger boy, but the snowball turns out to be a chunk of marble. The young boy dies from the impact.

In the final section, a card shark plays a game with a woman on a table set up over the body of the dead boy. A theatre party looks on. The card shark extracts an Ace of Hearts from the dead boy's breast pocket. The boy's guardian angel appears and absorbs the dead boy. He also removes the Ace of Hearts from the card shark's hand and retreats up a flight of stairs and through a door. Realizing he has lost, the card shark commits suicide as the theatre party applauds. A female player transforms into the formerly smashed statue and walks off through the snow, leaving no footprints. In the film's final moments the statue is shown with an ox, a globe, and a lyre.

Intercut through the film, oneiric images appear, including spinning wire models of a human head and rotating double-sided masks.

== Cast ==
- Enrique Riveros as the Poet
- Elizabeth Lee Miller as the Statue
- Pauline Carton as the Instructor of Children
- Odette Talazac as Audience Member
- Jean Desbordes as Louis XV Friend
- Fernand Dichamps as Audience Member
- Lucien Jager as Audience Member
- Féral Benga as the Guardian Angel
- Barbette as herself

== Production and film ==
The Blood of a Poet was made during a time of transition to narrative sound film and still made use of written text such as the opening words: "Every poem is a coat of arms. It must be deciphered". The film is considered, along with The Golden Age (1930), one of two French films released at the end of this first phase of avant-garde film-making that continue to develop the model presented by Chien Andalou:

...elements of narrative and acting arouse the spectator's psychological participation in plot or scene while at the same time distancing the viewer by disallowing empathy, meaning and closure; an image of the disassociated sensibility or 'double consciousness' praised by Surrealism in its critique of naturalism

— The Oxford History of World Cinema

The film is a blend of Cocteau's classical aesthetics and the Baroque stylings of Surrealism. Cocteau's voice satirically explores his character's obsession with fame and death: "Those who smash statues should beware of becoming one". Dissolution of personal identity is presented in contrast with Western emphasis on stability and repetition. Cocteau would later write that, when he made the film, he "avoided the deliberate manifestations of the unconscious in favor of a kind of half-sleep where I labyrinthed myself. I was concerned only with the lustre and detail of the images that emerged from this deep night of the human body. I adopted them forthwith as documentary scenes of another realm".

The Blood of a Poet was funded by Charles, Vicomte de Noailles, who gave Cocteau 1 million francs to make it. Cocteau invited the Vicomte and his wife Marie-Laure de Noailles, along with several of their friends, to appear in a scene as a theatre party. In the scene, they talked among themselves and, on cue, began applauding. Upon seeing the completed film, they were horrified to learn that they were applauding a game of cards that ended with a suicide, which had been filmed separately. They refused to let Cocteau release the film with their scene included, so Cocteau re-shot it with the famed female impersonator Barbette and some extras.

The film is not considered to be anti-theocratic in the way of Luis Buñuel's L'Age d'Or, but the film's protagonist does explore such varied topics as magic, archaic art, China, opium and transvestism before dying while playing cards in front of an indifferent audience.

== Delayed release ==
Shortly after the completion of the film, rumors began to circulate that it contained an anti-Christian message. This, combined with the riotous reception of another controversial Noailles-produced film, L'Âge d'or, led to Charles de Noailles' expulsion from the famous Jockey-Club de Paris, and he was even threatened with excommunication by the Catholic Church. The furore caused the release of The Blood of a Poet to be delayed for more than a year.

== Reception ==
Film critic Pauline Kael mentions that revivals of the film led to Cocteau being considered one of the most important filmmakers of his time because he was "an artist using the medium for his own end."

On Rotten Tomatoes, the film holds an approval rating of 94% based on 18 reviews, with a weighted average rating of 7.6/10. Author and film critic Leonard Maltin awarded the film three out of four stars, calling it "imaginative, dreamlike, and still a visual delight".
