= Jean Grouet =

French publisher (born 1931)

Jean Grouet (born 1931) is a French publisher, scenarist, and assistant in the French movie industry. Between 1959 and 1973 he worked regularly as an assistant for Claude Chabrol and Roger Vadim, among others.

Jean Grouet submitted three scripts at the CNC (Centre National du Cinéma) between 1969 and 1973: "Le piège du fou", "La brève résurgence de Giordano B." et "La panoplie littéraire" d'après le roman de Bernard Franck.

A friend of Françoise Sagan and Bernard Frank, Jean Grouet founded Éditions Rupture and achieved success in 1977 with the publication of Rafaël Pividal's Pays Sages.

After the success of "Pays Sages" he published almost thirty novels and essays. Among the most important were "Front Polisario: l'âme d'un peuple" de Ahmed-Baba Miské suivi d'un entretien avec Jean Lacouture., "Le Socialisme à visage urbain" de Garnier et Goldschmidt and also a reedition of "Adolphe" by Benjamin Constant.

He later founded les nouvelles Editions Rupture where he published among other books the historical essay "Le Chevalier d'Éon et la guerre de Sept ans" from Valentin Pikoul.

He then worked as an Editor at the "Quai Voltaire" where he publishes "Le moulin d'Andé" (Collective work including a contribution by André Pons). Friend of the Freustie's he cofounds with Christiane Freustié, Jacques Brenner and others the ""Freustié prize" and participates to jury for many years. Jean Grouet knew the Freustie's since the 1950s when he and they helped the Algerian resistance, lending appartements and carrying suitcases for the FLN.

He joined the communist party in the mid-1950s but went away from it because of its lack of sustain to the Algerian movement of independence. He met at that period the Union and independent activist Arezki Ziani and started participating in the Jeanson network "Les porteurs de valises"

He said that the manuscript of 120 Days of Sodom was given to him by Nathalie de Noailles—daughter of Viscount Charles de Noailles and Marie-Laure de Noailles, a direct descendant of Sade. In 1982 Grouet smuggled the manuscript to Switzerland and sold it to Gérard Nordmann, a Swiss collector of erotica.
