= Gabriel Guevrekian =

American architect

Gabriel Guevrekian (or Guévrékian) (November 21, 1892 (?) Constantinople - October 29, 1970 Antibes) was an Armenian architect, who designed buildings, interiors and gardens, and taught architecture. He worked in Europe, Iran and the USA.

== Biography ==
Guevrekian was born by some accounts in 1900 (Imbert 1993, Turner 1996 ), by others in 1892 to Armenian parents. He was born in Constantinople, present day Istanbul, and then moved with his family to Tehran where he grew up. In 1910 he moved to Vienna where he lived with his uncle, architect Alex Galoustian. He studied architecture at the Kunstgewerbeschule with Oskar Strnad and Josef Hoffmann from 1915, and received his diploma in 1919. He then worked with Strnad and Hoffmann until he moved to Paris in 1922. In Paris he worked with le Corbusier, André Lurçat, Sigfried Giedion and Henri Sauvage. He worked with Robert Mallet-Stevens from 1922 until 1926, where he worked on the designs for Rue Mallet-Stevens while also pursuing his own projects. Guevrekian worked as an independent architect in Paris from 1926.

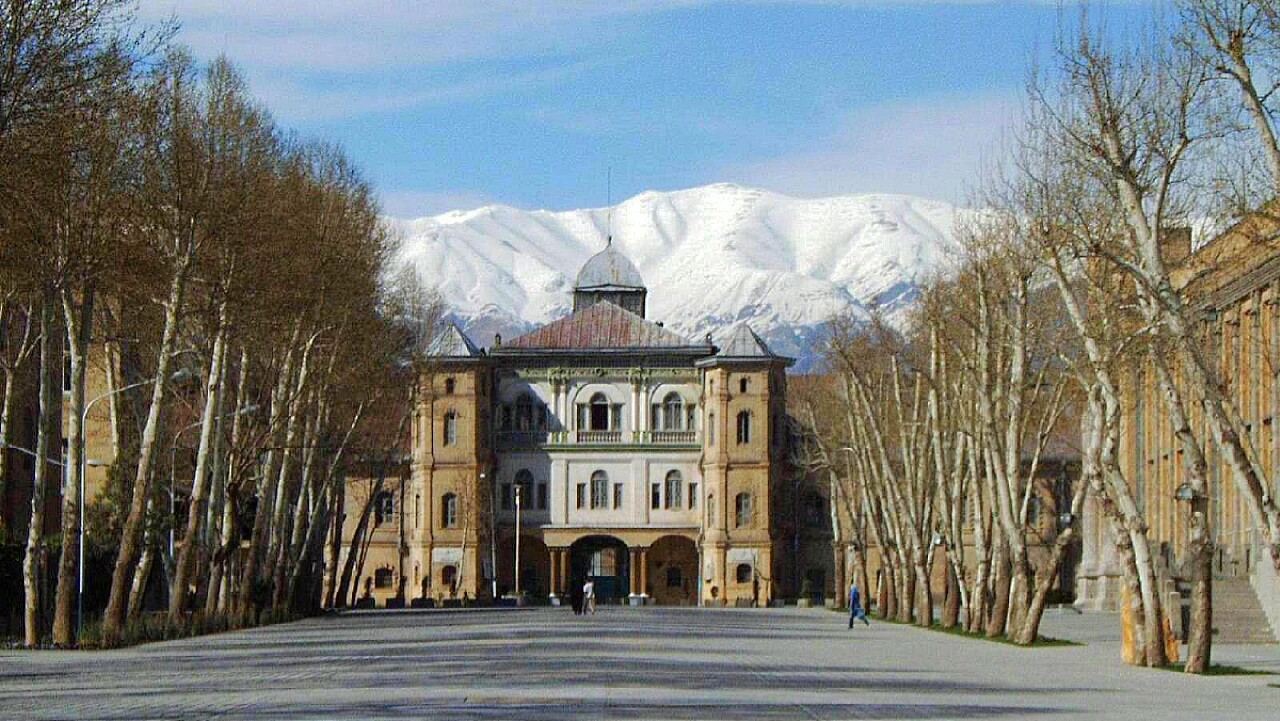
Compounds of the Foreign Ministry of Iran in which Guevrekian was their architectural planner

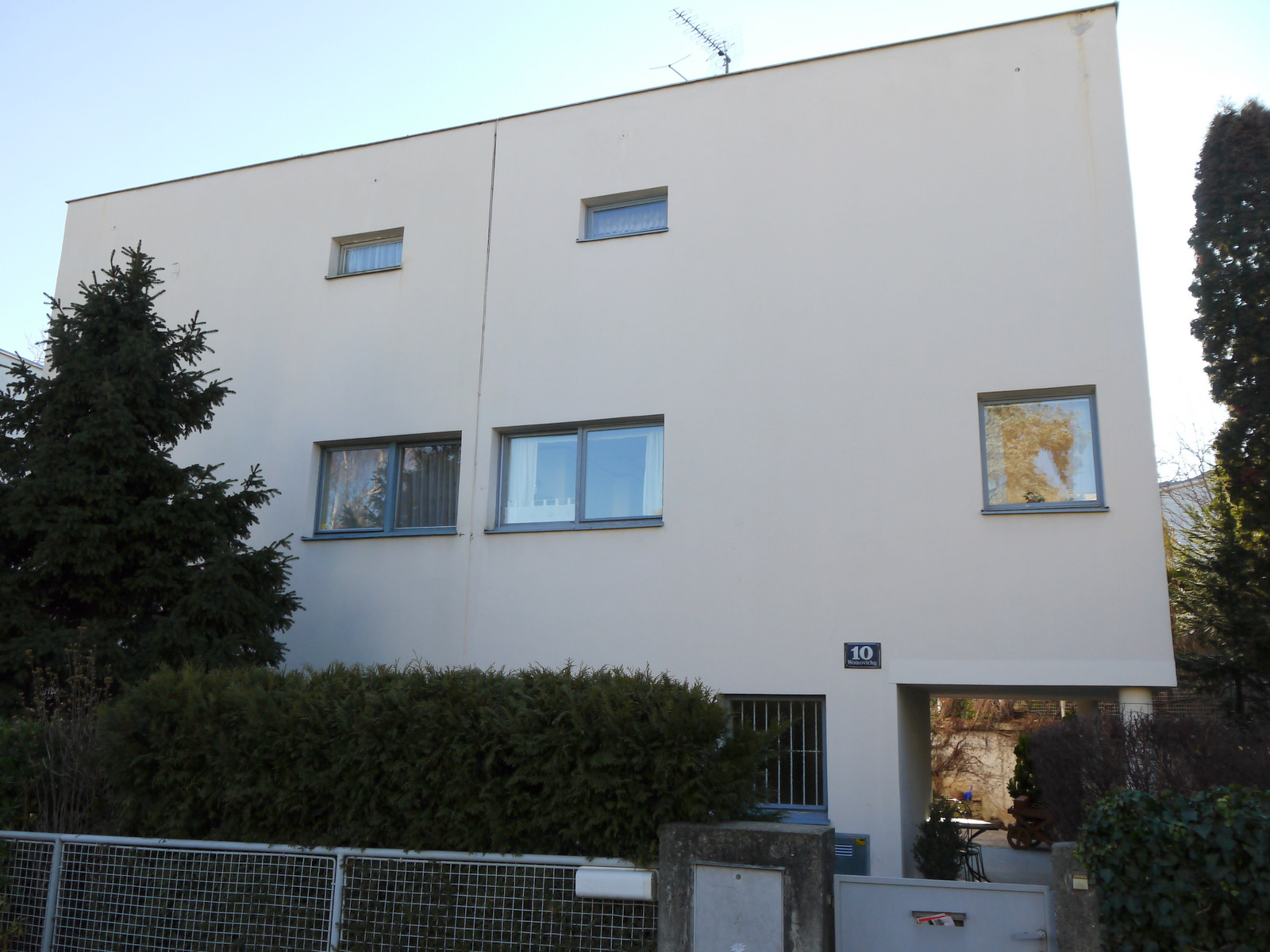
Houses in Vienna Werkbundsiedlung, designed by Guevrekian

He was actively involved in the early stages of the Congrès International d'Architecture Moderne (CIAM) which he chaired from 1928 until 1932, a position appointed him by le Corbusier (Turner 1996). He co-founded the magazine L’architecture d’aujourd’hui. Josef Frank invited him to design two houses for the Werkbundsiedlung in Vienna in 1932.

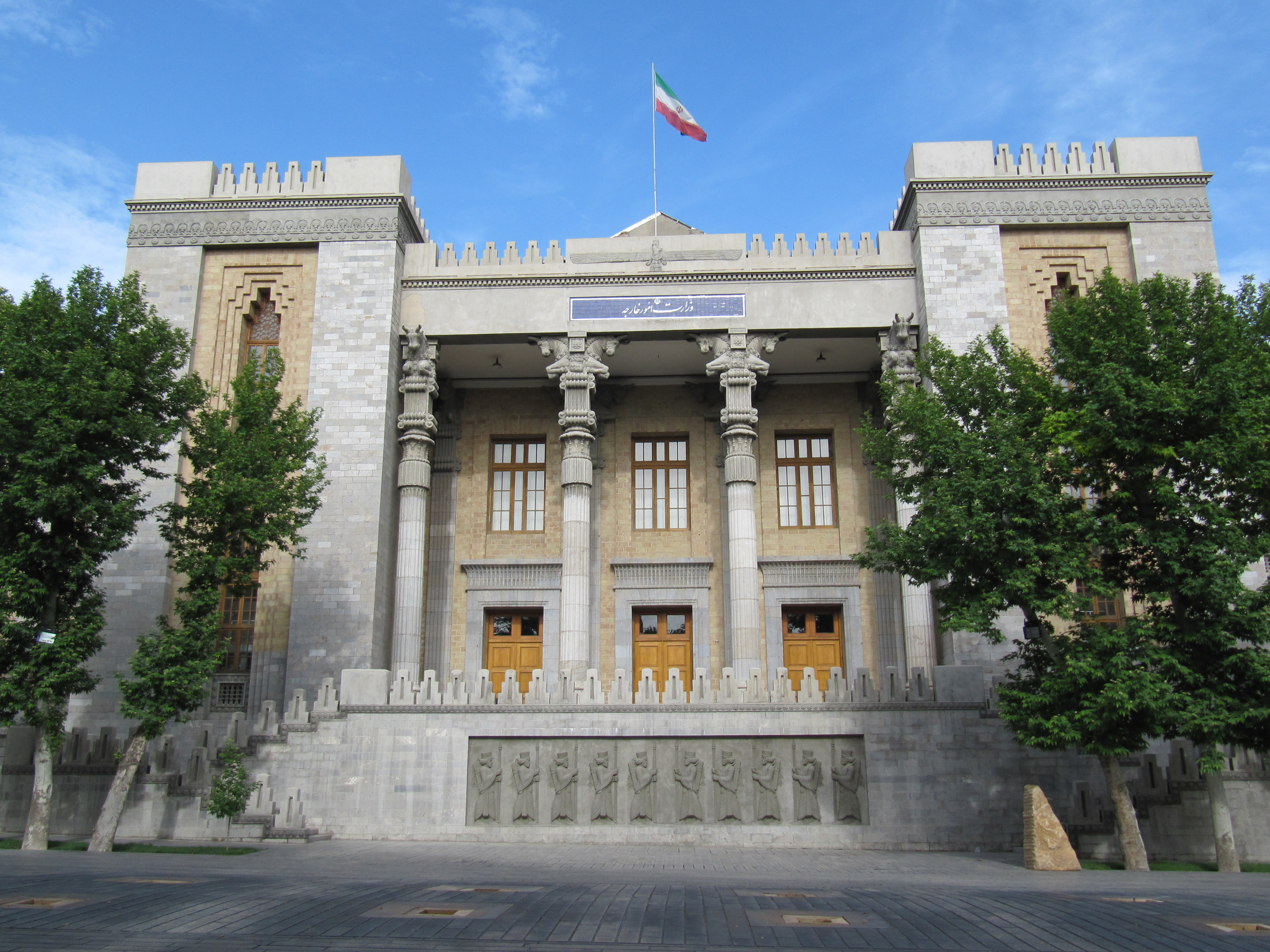
Kakh Shahrbani in Tehran

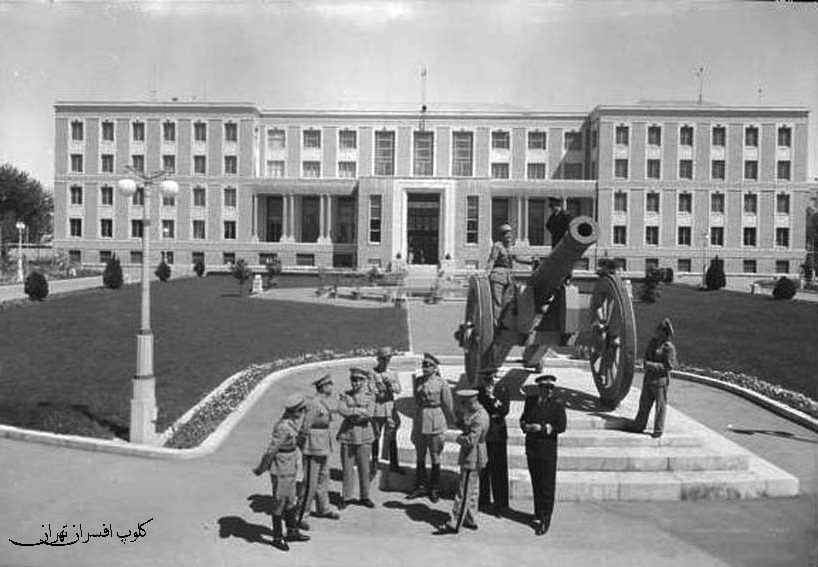
Officers' Club in Tehran

In 1933 he returned to Iran on invitation of the government. He designed governmental and public buildings, including Kakh Dadgostari Tehran, residences and villas, of which little is documented. He returned to Europe in 1937 and worked in London for three years, but due to the advent of World War II none of his projects were realised. 1940 he returned to Paris where he worked on the development of pre-fabricated housing while also teaching in Saarbrücken. He then ceased work from 1940-44 refusing to work for the Nazis and the Vichy government in France.

After the war he worked with Georges-Henri Pingusson on rebuilding Saarbrücken and also taught architecture there. In 1948 he moved to the USA to teach at the Alabama Polytechnic Institute. He became professor at the University of Illinois the next year, and taught there until his retirement in 1969. Guevrekian became a U.S.-citizen in 1955.

After his retirement Gabriel Guevrekian returned to France with his wife. He died 29 October 1970 in Antibes.

== Designs ==
Robert Mallet-Stevens had produced earlier works like les Roses Rouges which were hailed as jardin moderne and jardin d'avant garde. He also designed a garden for the 1925 Exposition des Arts Decoratifs. Through Mallet-Stevens, Guevrekian received an invitation to submit a modern rendering of the Persian Paradise Garden. (Wesley 1981 p. 17)

=== Garden of Water and Light ===
The Jardin d'Eau et de Lumiere for the 1925 Exposition Internationale des Arts Décoratifs was an equilateral triangle broken up into triangular elements. In the centre were four tiered reflecting pools decorated by Robert Delaunay that sat below a rotating, internally illuminated sphere. These were surrounded by tiered plantings and hemmed in by two low walls of small triangles of glass in white and shades of pink. The sphere and the reflecting surfaces meant that light was reflected in all directions within the garden. By night the internally illuminated sphere projected light outwards enlivening the composition. (Imbert 1993 p. 128, Adams 1993 p. 32, Dodds 2002 p. 185)

Initially labelled in the press as a Persian garden, it eventually became referred to as the Cubist garden (Adams 1993 p. 30). For the same exposition, Guevrekian designed a pavilion for Sonia Delaunay and Jacques Heim.

=== Cubist garden at Villa Noailles ===
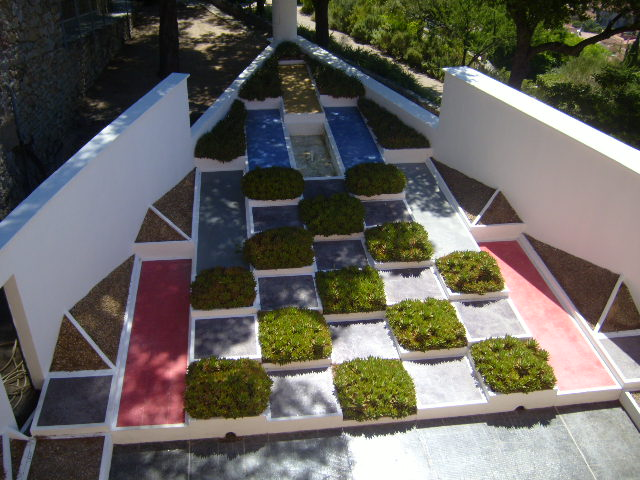
Cubist garden at Villa Noailles

His subsequent garden for Charles and Marie-Laure de Noailles at Villa Noailles had an imposed space whose triangular shape the clients and Mallet-Stevens viewed as suited to Guevrekian's new design style. Noailles had consulted both Mies van der Rohe and le Corbusier before employing Mallet-Stevens. He wanted artifice in his landscape. The Villa commanded great views of the Côte d’Azur and Noailles wished to contrast this strongly with an enclosed and architectonic ensemble that framed the natural whilst delineating ownership. (Imbert 1997 p. 130-132)

The disregard for the needs of the plants in the Noailles garden and the differing growth rates soon disrupted the balance of the design and prompted Charles de Noailles, himself a famous amateur gardener, to replant the design entirely, not long after its instigation. It was, however, a progression on the Paris garden by its regard for physical occupation.

=== Villa Heim ===
For Jacques Heim Guevrekian designed Villa Heim, built 1927-1930. He also designed the interior and furniture, and a garden consisting of a series of rectangular terraces. Villa Heim featured in L'Illustration and L'Architecte. Guevrekian was well involved with the CIAM by this time and had shifted to a more functional style. The house has since been modified extensively and has been split into two apartments.

== Readings of his work ==
Whether that was the artist's intention, as for subsequent gardens, is hard to determine. As Imbert points out "due to the paucity of written evidence, the garden designers’ intentions remain largely undocumented; that they appreciated the implications of the cubist movement for their field, however, is most certain. (Imbert 1997 p. 169) Criticisms of the work as being too literal a translation of, or direct reference to, cubist painting is both unfair and imperceptive (and usually based on Wesley's critique or similar ideas). Although his primary artistic medium was painting, Guevrekian designed with more influences than cubist painting and a greater understanding of modern media and techniques than he is often given credit for.

George Dodds provides this reading of the Paradise garden; "Paradise garden are idealised and isolated enclaves in which a water element representing the four rivers of paradise divides the space into four equal precincts." (Dodds 2002 p. 192) Given the very limited space that Guevrekian had to work with and the need for people to be able to parade past, Dodds reads the four reflection pools as being this element with the garden halved for convenience. "The early Mesopotamian settlers conceived of the sky as a triangle and depicted it as a mountain. The moon, which brought relief from the relentless sun, was depicted as a tree atop the mountain of the sky. As trees mark an oasis and the moon is a life-giver, so the sap of the moon-tree must be water – the elixir of life." (Dodds 2002 p. 192-193) Guevrekian uses the metal sphere as both representative of the moon and tree, a technique he uses in later designs. The tree feeds the "water" in the pools below and the plants beyond.

Dodds also reads the form as being a "straight-up" axonometric rather than the "shallow and compressed" perspective that Wesley draws directly from Picasso. (Dodds 2002 p. 191) Guevrekian uses the axonometric, a popular architectural type where all measurements remain true in an idealised form. He develops this idea further with Robert and Sonia Delaunay, whose simultaneist art he draws upon and whom he later works with to form the purist movement.

== Works ==
- 1923: Galerie Au Sacre du Printemps, Paris
- 1925: two works at the Exposition Internationale des Arts Décoratifs et Industriels Modernes:
  - Boutique Simultané for Sonia Delaunay
  - Jardin d'eau et de lumière, temporary garden, Esplanades des Invalides, Paris. Robert Delaunay contributed.
- 1926: Cubist garden for Villa Noailles in Hyères
- 1927: Villa Heim, avenue de Madrid 17, Paris
- 1930-1932: Two houses at Werkbundsiedlung, Woinovichgasse 10-12, Vienna
- 1933-1937: public and private buildings in Tehran, some built after Guevrekian left Iran:
  - Vilā Siāsi
  - Vilā Panāhi
  - Vilā Firuz
  - Villa Ch. Kosrovani

== Bibliography ==
Adams, W.H. 1993 Grounds For Change, Bullfinch Press, Boston

Blau, E, Troy, N & Cottington, D, 1997 Architecture and Cubism, MIT Press, Cambridge Massachusetts pp. 8–15

Imbert, D 1993, The Modernist Garden in France, Yale University Press, London

Imbert, D 1997 ‘Unnatural Acts: Propositions for a New French Architecture’, in Architecture and Cubism, Blau, E, Troy, N & Cottington, D, MIT Press, Cambridge Massachusetts pp. 167–182

Turner, J 1996, Grove Dictionary of Art, Grove, Oxford U.K. https://web.archive.org/web/20110606151630/http://www.groveart.com/shared/views/article.html?section=art.062609

Wesley, R 1981 ‘Gabriel Guevrekian and the Cubist Garden’ Rassegna, Volume 8, October 1981, pages 17–24

== Sources ==
- Dodds, George (2002). "10. Freedom from the Garden". Tradition and innovation in French garden art. University of Pennsylvania Press. pp. 184–202. ISBN 0-8122-3634-3.
