= Ivan Bloch =

Ivan Bloch may refer to:

- Iwan Bloch (1872–1922), German sexologist
- Jan Gotlib Bloch (1836–1902), Polish banker and military theorist
