= Villa Noailles =

Modernist house by Robert Mallet-Stevens

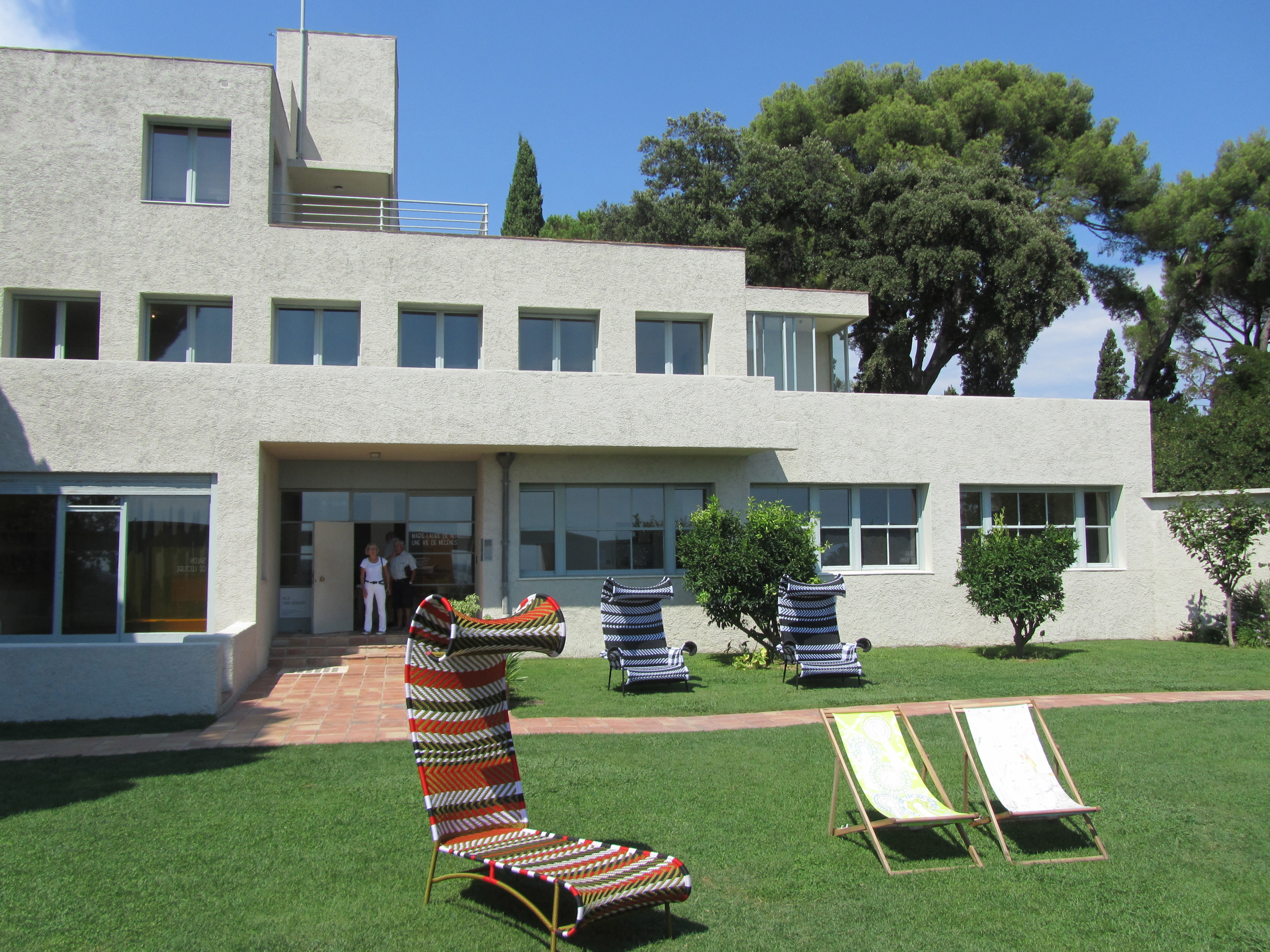
- Interactive map of the Villa Noailles area

General information
- Architectural style: International style
- Location: Hyères, France
- Coordinates: 43°07′26″N 6°07′38″E
- Construction started: 1923
- Completed: 1928
- Renovated: 1991; 1997
- Client: Marie-Laure and Charles de Noailles
- Owner: Commune of Hyères

Technical details
- Floor area: 1,800 m^{2} (19,000 sq ft)

Design and construction
- Architect: Robert Mallet-Stevens

Website
- www.villanoailles-hyeres.com
Designations
Monument historique
- Official name: Villa Marie-Laure-de-Noailles ou château Saint-Bernard
- Type: maison; château
- Designated: 1975, 1987
- Reference no.: PA00081651

Villa Noailles (French pronunciation: [vi.la no.aj]) is an early modernist house, built by architect Robert Mallet-Stevens for art patrons Charles and Marie-Laure de Noailles, between 1923 and 1927. It is located in the hills above Hyères, in the Var, southeastern France.

== History ==
Charles de Noailles was born in 1891, his wife Marie-Laure in 1902. They were married in 1923. Before their marriage, they became friends of artist-filmmaker Jean Cocteau, and Noailles commissioned a portrait of his wife by Pablo Picasso in 1923.

In 1923, they signed a contract with the architect Robert Mallet-Stevens to build a summer villa in the hills above the city of Hyères. Construction took three years, and eventually also included a triangular Cubist garden designed by Gabriel Guevrekian.

The main artists noticed at the Salon des artistes décorateurs of 1924 for their integrated furniture were commissioned. The decoration included furniture bought or made specially for the villa, by Mallet-Stevens himself with his armchair « Transat » created for the swimming pool, by Djo-Bourgeois, Francis Jourdain, Pierre Legrain, Pierre Chareau, Jean Prouvé, Eileen Gray, Charlotte Perriand, Dominique (Marie André Domin), Sybold van Ravesteyn and Theo van Doesburg from De Stijl, the Wassily Chair of Marcel Breuer, or from the brands Smith & Co and Ronéo, as well as textiles by Raoul Dufy and Sonia Delaunay, luminaires by Jean Perzel, ironworks by Claudius Linossier, stained glass by Louis Barillet and pieces of art : sculptures by Jean and Joël Martel, Henri Laurens, Constantin Brâncuși, Alberto Giacometti, Jacques Lipchitz, paintings by Mondrian or Braque, etc.

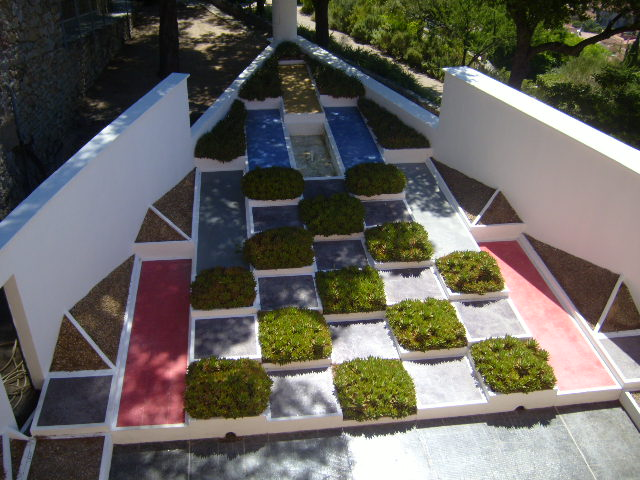
The Cubist Garden designed by Gabriel Guevrekian.

Throughout the 1920s and 1930s, the couple were important patrons of modern art, particularly surrealism; they supported film projects by Man Ray, Salvador Dalí, and Luis Buñuel; and commissioned paintings, photographs and sculptures by Balthus, Giacometti, Constantin Brâncuși, Miró, and Dora Maar. Villa Noailles features prominently in Man Ray's film Les Mystères du Château de Dé.

In 1940 the villa was occupied by the Italian Army and turned into a hospital. From 1947 until 1970, the villa was the summer residence of Marie-Laure. She died in 1970, and the house was purchased by the city of Hyères in 1973. Charles de Noailles died in 1981. The villa is now used as an arts center and for special exhibits.

James Lord was a guest there in the mid-fifties. In his book Picasso and Dora: a memoir he writes: "...an undistinguished cubist extravaganza of reinforced concrete set atop a high hill, within the ancient walls of a Saracen fortress. It had been designed in the late twenties by a fashionable architect named Mallet-Stevens, contained something like fifty rooms and was surrounded by a large garden." He recalls the room, where Marie-Laure tried to seduce him: "...a large salon at Saint-Bernard which had no windows but was lighted from above by a bizarre cubist skylight which occupied almost all the ceiling, adding to the sense of existing outside time in a stranded ocean liner." The beauty of the location did not help, however, the "redoutable viscountess" in conquering his chastity.
