= Sybold van Ravesteyn =

Dutch architect (1889–1983)

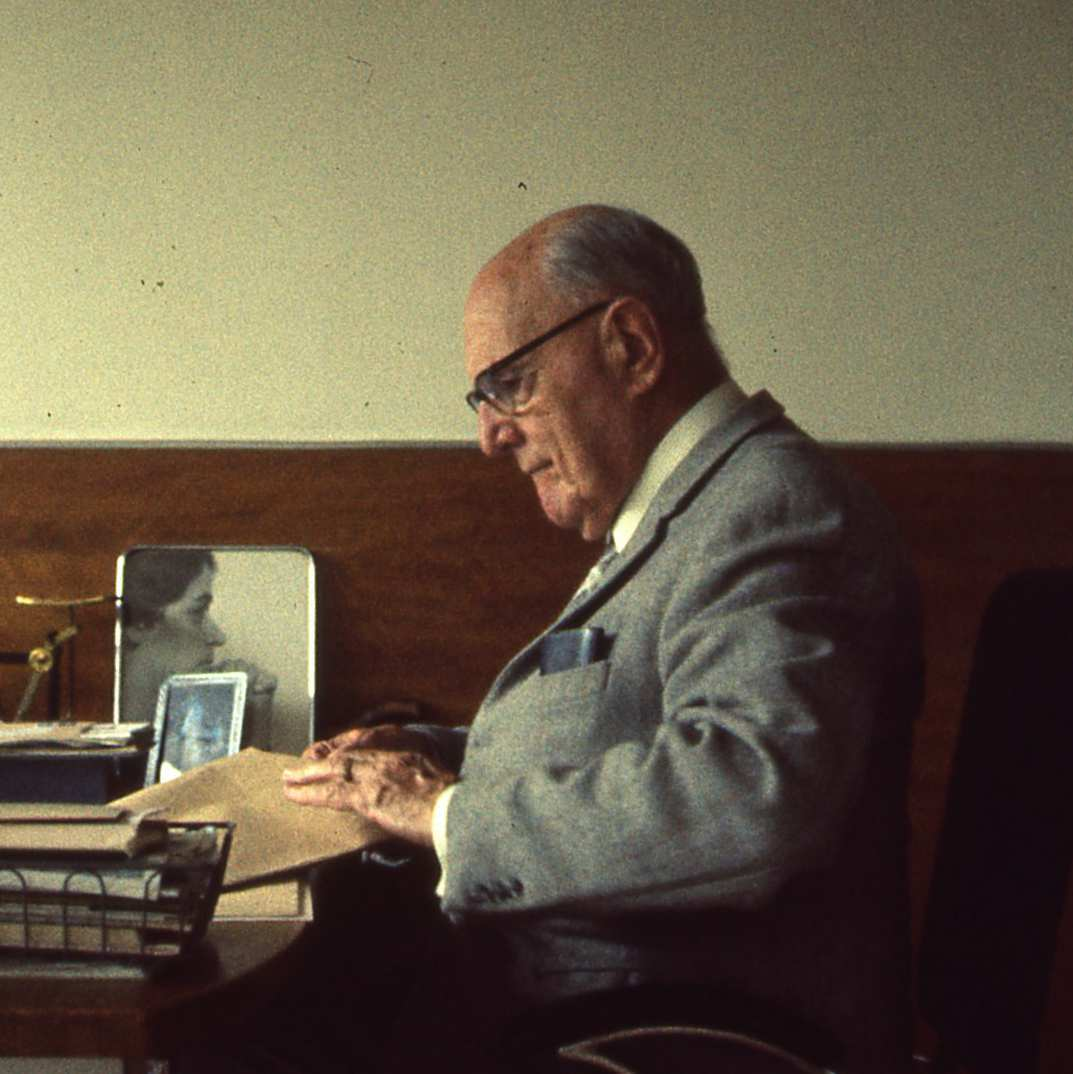
Portrait of Sybold van Ravesteyn, 1974

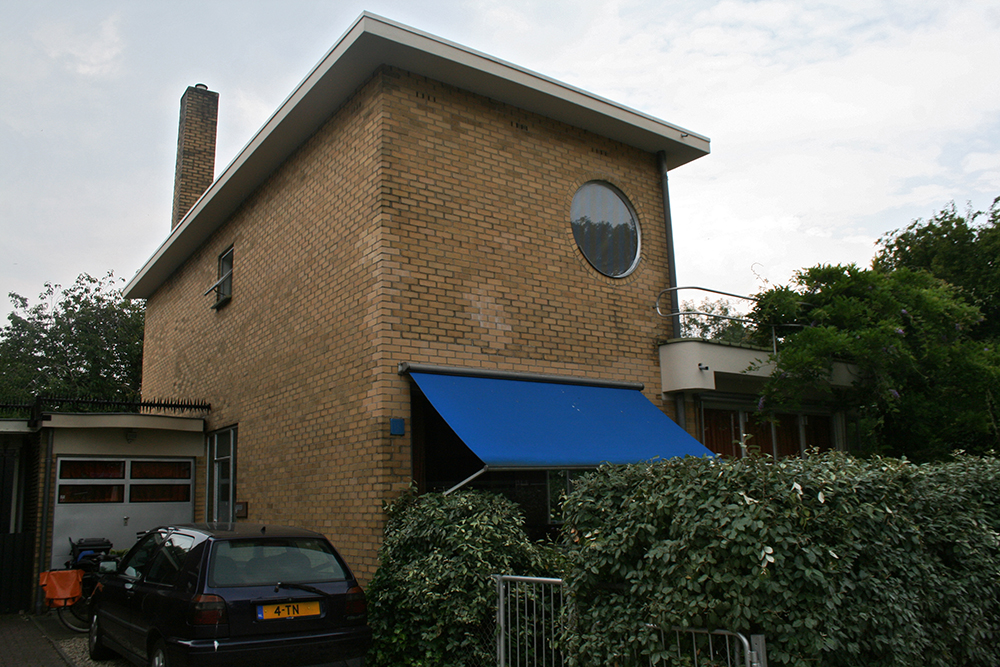
House built by Van Ravesteyn for himself around 1934 in what was then unspoilt country around Utrecht.

Sybold van Ravesteyn (born Sijbold van Ravesteijn, 18 February 1889 – 23 November 1983) was a Dutch architect. He designed many train stations, many now demolished, a zoo, public buildings such as theatres, as well as residences, interiors and furniture.

== Biography ==
Sybold van Ravesteyn was born 18 February 1889 in Rotterdam. After he studied civil engineering at the Delft University of Technology (1906–1912), van Ravesteyn worked as an engineer for the Maatschappij tot Exploitatie van Staatsspoorwegen and became a specialist on reinforced concrete. He married Dora Hintzen in 1915, with whom he had three sons and a daughter. Van Ravesteyn was influenced by his wife's interest in art. He started to design furniture for his own use, influenced by the Amsterdamse School and later De Stijl movements. In 1921 he became an architect for the Nederlandse Spoorwegen. His first own design was a goods shed and offices in Arnhem (1924). In 1926 he designed a room for Villa Noailles.

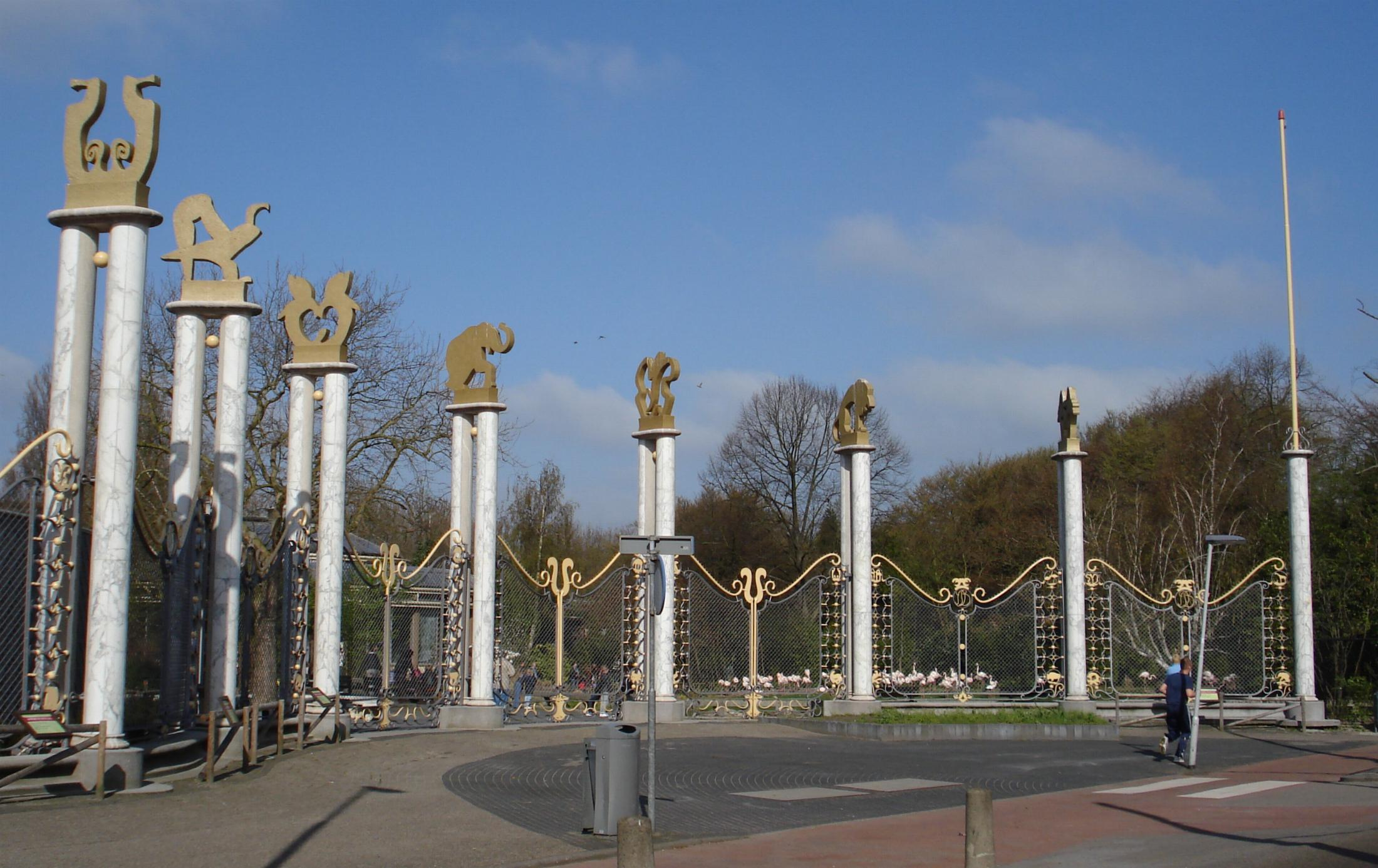
Gates of Diergaarde Blijdorp.

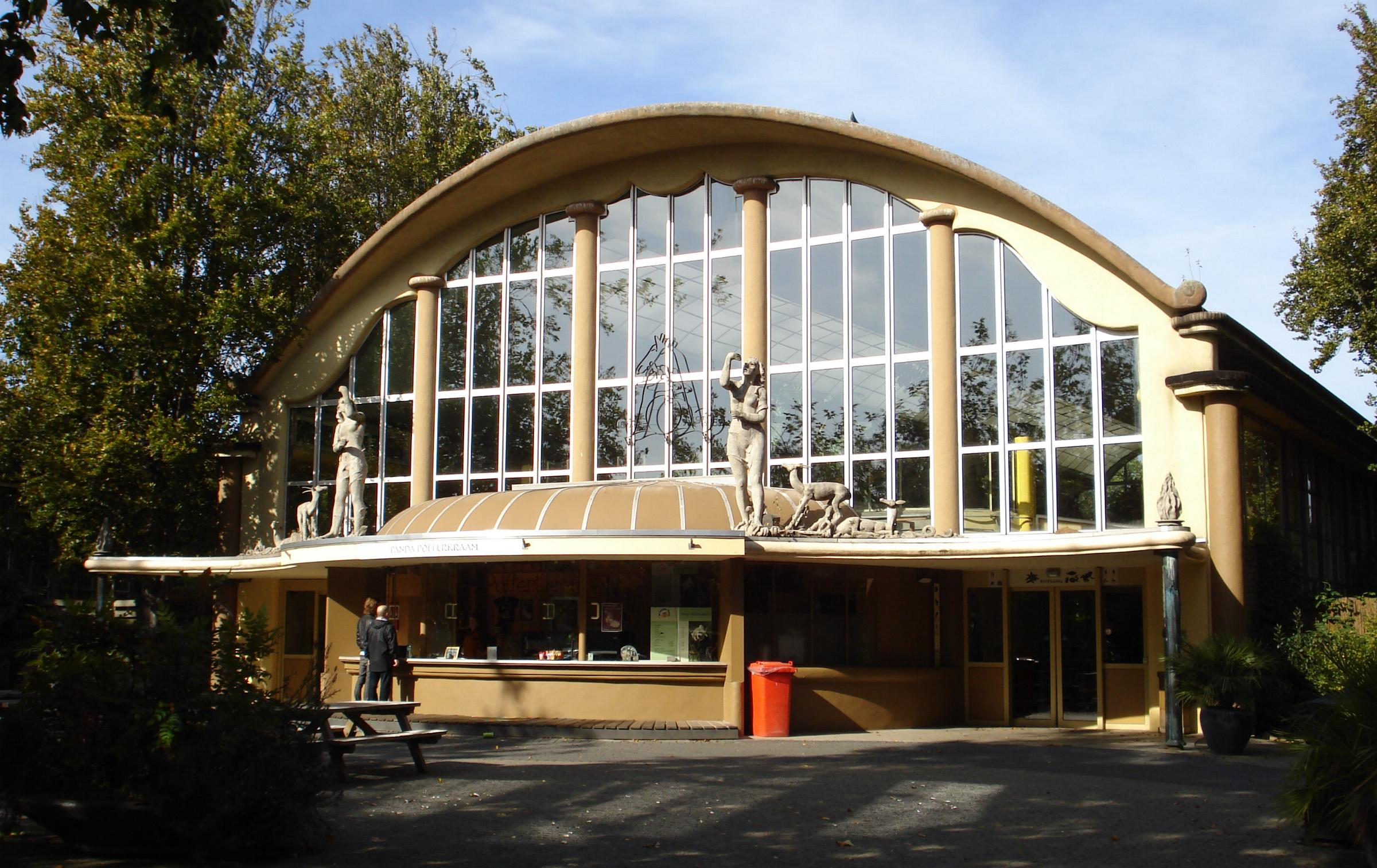
Rivièrahal, Diergaarde Blijdorp

In 1931 he divorced and married Johanna van Geelkerken, with whom he had one son. For the Nederlandse Spoorwegen he designed several railway stations, influenced by the Nieuwe Bouwen modernist style. Apart from his job for the Dutch railways, he ran his own agency, designing residences, including his own family's in Utrecht, and furniture, experimenting with a curvaceous style not as focused on functionalism. In 1935 he wrote: "Modern architecture is not square, it is alive".

His work for the railways enabled him to travel, and in 1936 he visited Rome, where he studied baroque architecture, which he loved, and Benito Mussolini's rebuilding of Rome, including the opening up of Saint Peter's Square. His vision and ornamental style increasingly clashed with that of his modernist colleagues. Sybold van Ravesteyn designed the entire Diergaarde Blijdorp zoo (1937–1940), a project he called his life's work. He also designed the interior of the royal yacht Piet Hein (1937), offered as a wedding gift to Juliana and Bernhard.

During World War II van Ravesteyn remained a member of the Nazi-controlled association of architects to be able to continue his work as an architect, and also designed a railway carriage for Arthur Seyss-Inquart.

After the war he was officially rebuked. He built a series of petrol stations for Purfina, theatres, and railway stations.

Sybold van Ravesteyn died 23 November 1983 in the Rosa Spier Huis retirement home in Laren.

== Works ==
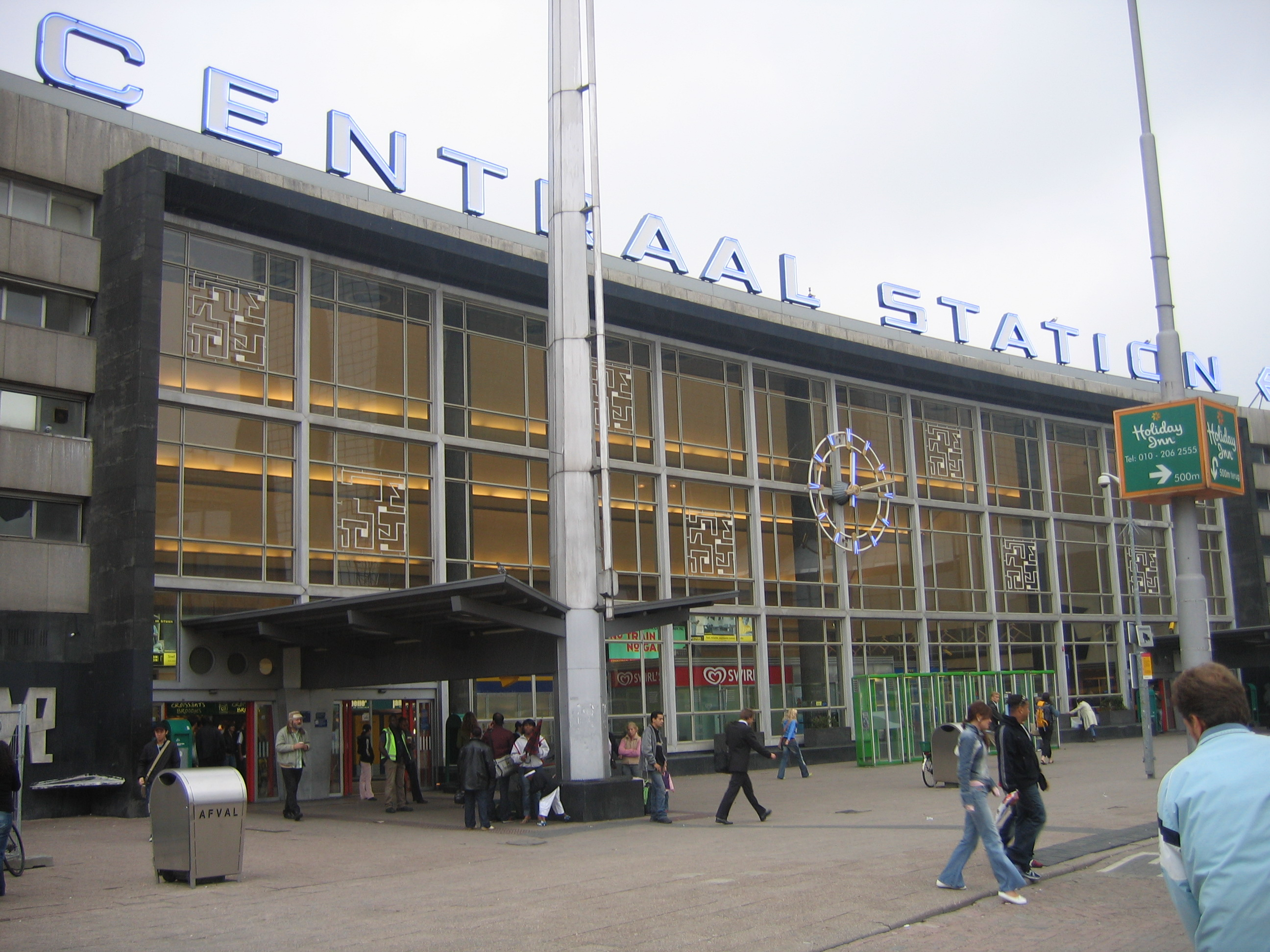
The former Rotterdam Centraal Station which closed on September 2, 2007.

Signal house near rail (Maastricht)

Incomplete list of works by Sybold van Ravesteyn (source Huygens ING unless otherwise indicated):

- Goods shed and offices, Arnhem (1924)
- Guest room of Villa Noailles (1926)
- Remodelling of jhr. M.R. Radermacher Schorer's house, Utrecht (1927)
- Water tower, Roermond (1928), rijksmonument #506153
- Sybold van Ravesteyn's own house, Prins Hendriklaan, Utrecht (1932-1934)
- Lutterade railway station (1931) (demolished)
- Spekholzerheide railway station (1933)
- Kerkrade Centrum railway station (1933) (demolished)
- Remodelling of Rotterdam Blaak railway station (1934) (destroyed in the Rotterdam Blitz)
- Holiday home De Zephyr, Bergen aan Zee (1936) rijksmonument #520744
- Remodelling of Utrecht Centraal railway station (1936–1940)
- De Holland insurance building, Dordrecht (1937–1939) Restored and converted (2012-15) into the Netherlands National Education Museum
- Royal yacht Piet Hein (interior) (1937)
- Diergaarde Blijdorp (1937–1940, rijksmonument #530738)
- Kunstmin theatre in Dordrecht (remodelling) (1938–1940, rijksmonument #522321)
- A dining room in the SS Nieuw Amsterdam (1938)
- Roosendaal railway station (remodelling) (1949)
- Vlissingen railway station (1950)
- Theatre of Vlaardingen (1951)
- Dutch Reformed church De Hoeksteen, Emmeloord (1951)
- 's-Hertogenbosch railway station (1952)
- Nijmegen railway station (1954)
- Rotterdam Centraal railway station (1950–1957) (demolished)
- Twenty Purfina petrol stations (1947–1963)
