= Les Mystères du Château du Dé =

1929 short film

Les Mystères du Château de Dé
- Directed by: Man Ray; Jacques-André Boiffard
- Written by: Man Ray; Jacques-André Boiffard
- Produced by: Le Vicomte de Noailles
- Starring: Man Ray; Georges Auric; Le Comte de Beaumont; Le Vicomte de Noailles; Marie-Laure de Noailles; Jacques-André Boiffard
- Release date: 1929 (France)
- Running time: 27 minutes

Les Mystères du Château du Dé (French for The Mysteries of the Castle of the Dice) is a 1929 film directed by Man Ray. It depicts a pair of travellers setting off from Paris and travelling to the Villa Noailles in Hyères on the French Riviera. At 27 minutes the film was the longest that Man Ray directed.

== Title ==
The French Cinémathèque gives the title as Les Mystères du château de dé.(not du dé as the film's title card spells it). Various versions of the title have been used in terms of capitalisation of the words (-château du dé, - château du Dé, or -Château du Dé).

== Synopsis ==
Les Mystères du Château du Dé (1929)

To the Viscountess of Noailles. I dedicate these pictures which can never reveal the extent of her kindness and charm. How two travellers arrived in St. Bernard, what they saw in the ruins of an old castle on top of which a modern-time castle stands. The travellers: MAN RAY, J.-A. Boiffard.

The film opens from a night scene to two masked individuals at a cafe. They decide their actions on the role of dice.

A throw of dice will never abolish chance.

(based on a line from a poem by Stéphane Mallarmé)

The hands are that of mannequins, their faces devoid of detail. Before the throw, their destination appears on a hillside in the form of both modern and ancient castles.

Are we going?
We're not going
We're going!

And their journey begins. Departing from their cafe, they travel through the French countryside arriving at the town of Hyères and their destination to find the modern castle empty. Elements of the interior explore various spatial relationships and textures. The film shows sculptures by Jacques Lipchitz and Henri Laurens, as well as the Cubist garden at Villa Noailles.

After a while, we are introduced to four intruders who are in turn resigning their fate to that of the dice. Upon their throw, they depart for the indoor swimming pool at the villa and entertain the viewer with various diving and gymnastic movements, including a woman juggling underwater and exercising with medicine balls. Actors explore the villas confines, until they eventually retire, fading from the screen.

More moving shots of the villas external until two more travellers arrive at the location, again playing for chance within the garden. They proceed to stay overnight, bringing the film to an abrupt end.

== Restoration ==
Originally a silent film, recent copies have included music taken from Man Ray's personal record collection at the time, including recordings of Erik Satie's Gymnopédies. The musical reconstruction was written by Jacques Guillot.

The film was restored by the Musée National d'Art Moderne under the direction of Jean-Michel Bouhours, a film curator.Restoration of the nitrate prints by Service des Archives du film (CNC) Bois d'Arcy, video editing by Didier Coudray. The film was the object of a 4K restoration in 2023.

== Reception ==
"Some of the best effects are achieved with long shots through windows into landscapes, while the camera is moving at the same time."
