= Charles de Noailles =

French nobleman and patron of the arts (1891-1981)

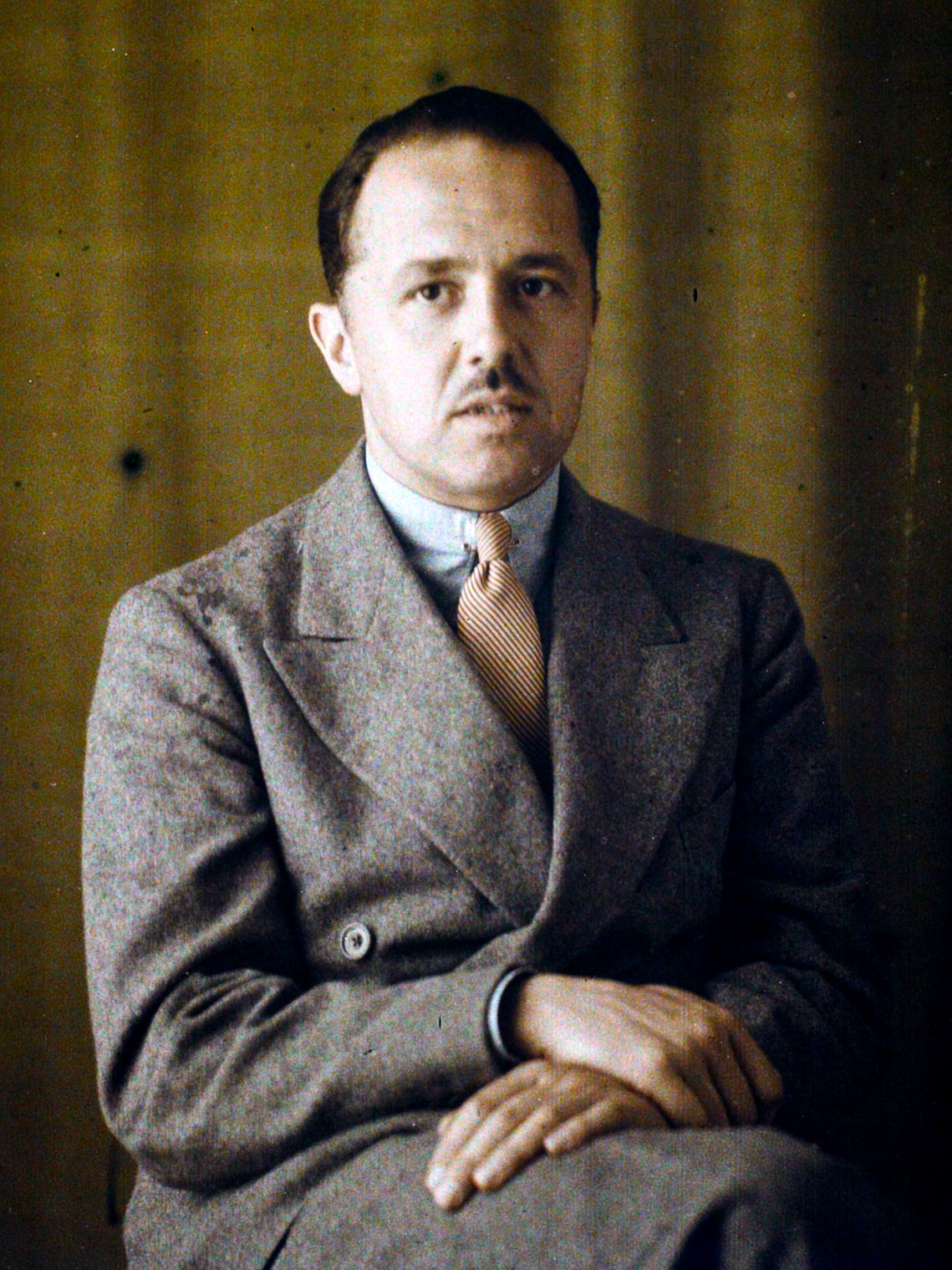
- Autochrome by Georges Chevalier, 1930
- Born: 26 September 1891; Paris, France
- Died: 28 April 1981 (aged 89); Grasse, France
- Resting place: Montparnasse Cemetery
- Known for: Film production, art collecting
- Notable work: The Blood of a Poet, L'Âge d'Or
- Spouse: Marie-Laure Bischoffsheim (m. 1923; died 1970)
- Children: 2

Charles de Noailles or Arthur Anne Marie Charles, Vicomte de Noailles (26 September 1891 – 28 April 1981) was a French nobleman and patron of the arts.

== Biography ==
Charles was born in Paris on 26 September 1891, the son of François Joseph Eugène Napoléon de Noailles and Madeleine Marie Isabelle Dubois de Courval. He married Marie-Laure Bischoffsheim on 9 February 1923 and the couple moved into 11 Place des États-Unis in Paris. Charles' mother gave them a plot in Hyères, for which first Mies van der Rohe and then Le Corbusier was asked to design a house. Ultimately, they asked Robert Mallet-Stevens, who would design Villa Noailles.

Their first daughter, Laure, was born on 8 September 1924. In December 1925, their house in Hyères was finished, and Charles and Marie-Laure would continue to expand Villa Noailles over the years. Natalie, their second daughter, was born 28 December 1925.

According to the memoirs of Alexis de Redé (1922–2004),

Marie-Laure was asked: 'Charles, he likes men, or does he like women?' She always replied: "Charles? He likes flowers." In fact he preferred men, as Marie-Laure discovered early in their married life, when she happened to come to his bedroom one afternoon and found him in bed with his good-looking gym instructor. But the incident was not discussed. They lived lives in part separate, in part together, and in many ways as a devoted couple, telephoning and writing to each other every day when they were apart. And even when in the same house, she would write him a letter and push it under his door, and promptly he would reply.

Charles died on April 28, 1981 in Grasse. He is buried in Montparnasse Cemetery in Paris.

== Patrons of the arts ==
Charles and Marie-Laure de Noailles were patrons of the arts. Their Hôtel particulier at Place des Etats-Unis was restored in the modern art style in 1926 by Jean-Michel Frank. It was a focus for a large circle of artists and intellectuals in Paris during the Surrealism era.

In 1929, Charles de Noailles bought the manuscript of The 120 Days of Sodom, the first great work of the Marquis de Sade. His wife Marie-Laure was a direct descendant of de Sade.

Charles financed Man Ray's Dada film Les Mystères du Château de Dé (1929), which centers around Villa Noailles in Hyères. He also financed Jean Cocteau's film Le Sang d'un Poète (1930) and Luis Buñuel's L'Âge d'Or (1930), which was co-written by Salvador Dalí. Charles and his wife appeared in Les Mystères du Château de Dé as well as Le Sang d'un Poète.

In 1929 or 1930, Charles made possible the career of Salvador Dalí by purchasing in advance a large work for 29,000 francs, thus enabling Dali and Gala Dalí to return from Paris to Portlligat and devote themselves to his art.

The de Noailles had an extensive correspondence with French composer and pianist Francis Poulenc and commissioned him on two occasions. Poulenc received 25000 Francs for Aubade, which he wrote for one of the de Noailles' balls at Place des États-Unis, where it premiered on June 18, 1929. Le Bal Masqué, inspired by Max Jacob's Le Laboratoire Central, was written for a private celebration on April 20, 1932 at the municipal theatre in Hyères.

== Gardener ==
Charles de Noailles was an inveterate gardener. With Roy Lancaster, he published Plantes de jardins méditerranéens, and Camellia sasanqua Vicomte de Noailles was named after him.

== Bibliography ==
- Laurence Benaïm (2001). Marie-Laure de Noailles : la vicomtesse du bizarre. ISBN 978-2-246-52981-1.
- Vickers, Hugo, ed. (2005). Alexis: The Memoirs of the Baron de Rédé. ISBN 1-904349-03-X.
