= L'Age d'Or =

1930 French surrealist comedy film directed by Luis Buñuel

- Poster for a 1970s re-release of L'Age d'Or
- Directed by: Luis Buñuel
- Written by: Luis Buñuel; Salvador Dalí
- Produced by: Vicomte Charles de Noailles; Marie-Laure de Noailles
- Starring: Gaston Modot; Lya Lys; Caridad de Laberdesque; Lionel Salem; Max Ernst; Germaine Noizet; Josep Llorens Artigas; Duchange; Bonaventura Ibáñez
- Cinematography: Albert Duverger
- Edited by: Luis Buñuel
- Music by: Luis Buñuel; Georges van Parys
- Distributed by: Corinth Films (1979 U.S. release)
- Release date: 29 November 1930
- Running time: 63 minutes
- Country: France
- Language: French
- Budget: 1 million francs

L'Age d'Or (French: L'Âge d'or, pronounced [lɑʒ dɔʁ]), commonly translated as The Golden Age or Age of Gold, is a 1930 French surrealist satirical comedy film directed by Luis Buñuel; the film is about the insanities of modern life, the hypocrisy of the sexual mores of bourgeois society, and the value system of the Catholic Church. The screenplay is by Buñuel and Salvador Dalí. Although L'Age d'Or was one of the first sound films made in France, along with Miss Europe and Under the Roofs of Paris, much of the story is told with title cards like a predominantly silent film. It has been regarded as a founding work of surrealism and one of Bunuel's finest films.

== Synopsis ==
L'Age d'Or (1930)

The first scene of the film is a documentary about scorpions. After that, the film is a series of vignettes, wherein a couple's attempts at consummating their romantic relationship are continually thwarted by the bourgeois values and sexual mores of family, church, and society.

The couple are first seen creating a disturbance by having sex in the mud during a religious ceremony. The man is apprehended and led away by two men who struggle to control their captive's sudden impulses. He momentarily breaks free long enough to kick a small dog. Later he struggles free to aggressively crush a beetle with his shoe. As he is escorted through city streets, he sees an advertisement that inspires him to fantasize a woman's hand rubbing herself, and becomes transfixed by another advertisement showing a woman's legs in silk stockings. He eventually escapes his handlers, inexplicably assaults a blind man standing at a curb, and gets into a taxi.

Meanwhile, the woman is at home, where she tells her mother she hurt her finger, which is wrapped in a bandage that disappears and reappears from scene to scene. The woman and her parents attend a party where the guests seem oblivious to alarming or incongruous events in their midst: a maid screams and falls to the floor after emerging from a doorway where flames are visible; a horse-drawn cart filled with rowdy men drinking from large bottles passes through the elegant company in the ballroom; the father converses with guests while ignoring several flies on his face; a small boy is shot and killed for a minor prank.

The man arrives at the party and sees his lover from across the room. He behaves brusquely toward the other guests while looking ardently in the woman's direction, and she looks longingly at him. The woman's mother hands the man a drink, but spills a drop on his hand. He becomes enraged and slaps her, which seems to excite the daughter. Seeking sexual release and satisfaction, the couple go into the garden and have sex next to a marble statue, while the rest of the party guests assemble outdoors for an orchestral performance of Liebestod. When the man is called away to answer a telephone call, the woman sublimates her sexual passion by fellating the toe of the statue until the man returns.

The Liebestod music stops abruptly when the conductor, his hands gripping his head, walks away, and wanders into the garden where the couple are. The woman runs to comfort the elderly conductor before finally French kissing him. The man stands up, bumping his head on a hanging flower pot, and grasps his head in pain as he leaves the garden. He stumbles away to her bedroom where he throws a burning tree, a bishop, a plow, the bishop's staff, a giraffe statue and handfuls of pillow feathers out the window.

The final vignette is an allusion to the Marquis de Sade's 1785 novel (first published in 1904) The 120 Days of Sodom—the intertitle reads: 120 Days of Depraved Acts—and is about an orgy in a castle, wherein the surviving orgiasts are ready to emerge to the light of mainstream society. From the castle door emerges the bearded and berobed Duc de Blangis (a character from de Sade's novel) who resembles common images of Jesus, the Christ, and who comforts a young woman who has run out from the castle, before he takes her back inside. Afterwards, a woman's scream is heard, and only the Duc re-emerges; and he is beardless. The concluding image is a Christian cross festooned with the scalps of women; to the accompaniment of jovial music, the scalps sway in the wind.

== Cast ==
- Gaston Modot as The Man
- Lya Lys as the Young Girl
- Caridad de Laberdesque as a Chambermaid and Little Girl
- Max Ernst as the Leader of men in cottage
- Josep Llorens Artigas as Governor
- Lionel Salem as Duke of Blangis
- Germaine Noizet as Marquise
- Duchange as Conductor
- Valentine Penrose as a Spirit

== Production ==
L'Age d'Or began as the second artistic collaboration between Luis Buñuel and Salvador Dalí, who had fallen out by the time of the film's production. A neophyte cinéast, Buñuel overcame his ignorance of cinematic production technique by sequentially filming most of the screenplay; the 63-minute film is composed of almost every meter of film exposed and dramatic sequence photographed.

The production budget was a million francs, and was financed and produced by the Vicomte Charles de Noailles (1891–1981), a nobleman who, beginning in 1928, yearly commissioned a film as a birthday gift to his wife, the Vicomtesse Marie-Laure de Noailles (1902–1970), who was a renowned patroness of the arts and of artists, such as Dalí and Buñuel, Balthus, Jean Cocteau, Man Ray, Francis Poulenc, Jean Hugo, Jean-Michel Frank and others.

L'Age d'Or included actors who were famous artists, such as Max Ernst and Josep Llorens Artigas.

== Reception ==
Upon receiving a cinematic exhibition permit from the Board of Censors, L'Age d'Or had its premiere presentation at Studio 28, Paris, on 29 November 1930. Later, on 3 December, the great popular success of the film provoked attacks by the right-wing Ligue des Patriotes (League of Patriots), whose angry viewers took umbrage at the visual statements made by Buñuel and Dalí. The reactionary French Patriots interrupted the screening by throwing ink at the cinema screen and assaulting viewers who opposed them. They then went to the lobby and destroyed art works by Dalí, Joan Miró, Man Ray, Yves Tanguy, and others. On 10 December, the Prefect of Police of Paris, Jean Chiappe, arranged to have the film banned from further public exhibition after the Board of Censors re-reviewed the film.

A contemporary right-wing Spanish newspaper published a condemnation of the film and of Buñuel and Dalí, which described the content of the film as "...the most repulsive corruption of our age ... the new poison which Judaism, Masonry, and rabid, revolutionary sectarianism want to use in order to corrupt the people". In response, the de Noailles family withdrew L'Age d'Or from commercial distribution and public exhibition for more than forty years; nonetheless, three years later, in 1933, the film was privately exhibited at the Museum of Modern Art, in New York City. Forty-nine years later, from 1–15 November 1979, the film had its legal U.S. premiere at the Roxie Cinema in San Francisco.

The film critic Robert Short said that the scalp-decorated crucifix and the scenes of socially repressive violence, wherein the love-struck protagonist is manhandled by two men, indicate that the social and psychological repression of the libido and of romantic passion and emotion, by the sexual mores of bourgeois society and by the value system of the Roman Catholic Church, breed violence in the relations among people, and violence by men against women.

In a review of the DVD release of L'Age D'Or and Un Chien Andalou, Philip French of The Guardian called the films "masterpieces" and the first authentic surrealist silent films.

== Legacy ==
Today, L'Age d'Or is widely regarded as one of the key works of surrealist cinema. British critic Philip French noted that the film, alongside Buñuel's Un Chien Andalou (1929), featured "bizarre sequences that assault bourgeois values and sexual oppression while making no logical sense, and they were acclaimed by the leading arbiters of surrealism as the first authentic surrealist films". In the British Film Institute's 2012 Sight & Sound polls, 15 critics and six directors named L'Age d'Or one of their 10 favorite films in history. Ed Gonzalez of Slant analyzed the film's sound design in relation to his argument that Buñuel's overriding message is the ability of love to "conquer all sorts of moral restraints".

Rotten Tomatoes reports an average rating of 8.7/10 among 28 critics, with 89% approval overall.

The band Tin Machine, fronted by David Bowie, re-enacted the toe sucking scene in their video for the 1991 song "You Belong in Rock n' Roll".

The screening of L'Age d'Or is dramatized in the 2018 Spanish-Dutch animated film Buñuel in the Labyrinth of the Turtles.

In April 2019, a restored version of the film was selected to be shown in the Cannes Classics section at the Cannes Film Festival.

== See also ==
- List of works by Salvador Dalí
