= Aubade (Poulenc) =

Composition by Francis Poulenc

- concerto chorégraphique
- Music for piano and ensemble by Francis Poulenc
- Poulenc in 1922
- Catalogue: FP 51a
- Composed: 1929
- Movements: 8

Premiere
- Date: 18 June 1929
- Location: Place des États-Unis in Paris
- Conductor: Francis Poulenc

Aubade (FP051a, and FP051b for the piano reduction), a choreographic concerto for piano and 18 instruments, is a work of Francis Poulenc premiered in 1929. It was conceived as a ballet, but is more often played as a chamber piano concerto.

== History ==
An aubade is a morning courting song, vs. a serenade in the evening. Here the action begins one morning, and ends the next day at dawn. Poulenc's work was originally conceived as ballet music, but is today regarded as a piano concerto. The work was premiered as a ballet on 18 June 1929 at the Noailles, which determined the size of the orchestra Poulenc could employ. The choreographer was Bronislava Nijinska. A few months later, it was revived at the Théâtre des Champs-Élysées in the choreography this time by George Balanchine, of which Poulenc disapproved.

Poulenc himself designed the scenario of the ballet whose theme is the solitude of women. The goddess Diana is the heroine. The action begins in a clearing. Diana's companions awaken little by little. Diana enters the scene, tormented by the chastity imposed on her. Her companions dress her then give her a bow: the hunt must serve her as a distraction. A solo of Diana follows, before she rejects the bow and goes into the forest, desperate. Her companions try to console her, but Diana goes hunting, alone. Her companions fall asleep.

== Structure ==
1. Toccata (lento et pesante)
2. Récitatif, (larghetto)
3. Rondeau, (allegro)
4. Presto
5. Récitatif (larghetto)
6. Andante (andante con moto)
7. Allegro féroce
8. Conclusion (adagio)

== Scoring ==
- solo piano, 2 flutes, 2 oboes (2nd doubling cor anglais), 2 clarinets, 2 bassoons, 2 horns in F, trumpet, 2 violas, 2 cellos, 2 double basses, 3 timpani.
- The execution time is about 21 minutes.

== Sources ==
- Guide de la musique symphonique, François-René Tranchefort, dir. and rédacteur, series "les indispensables de la musique", éd. Fayard 1986, (p. 586-587)
