= Iwan Bloch =

German dermatologist (1872–1922)

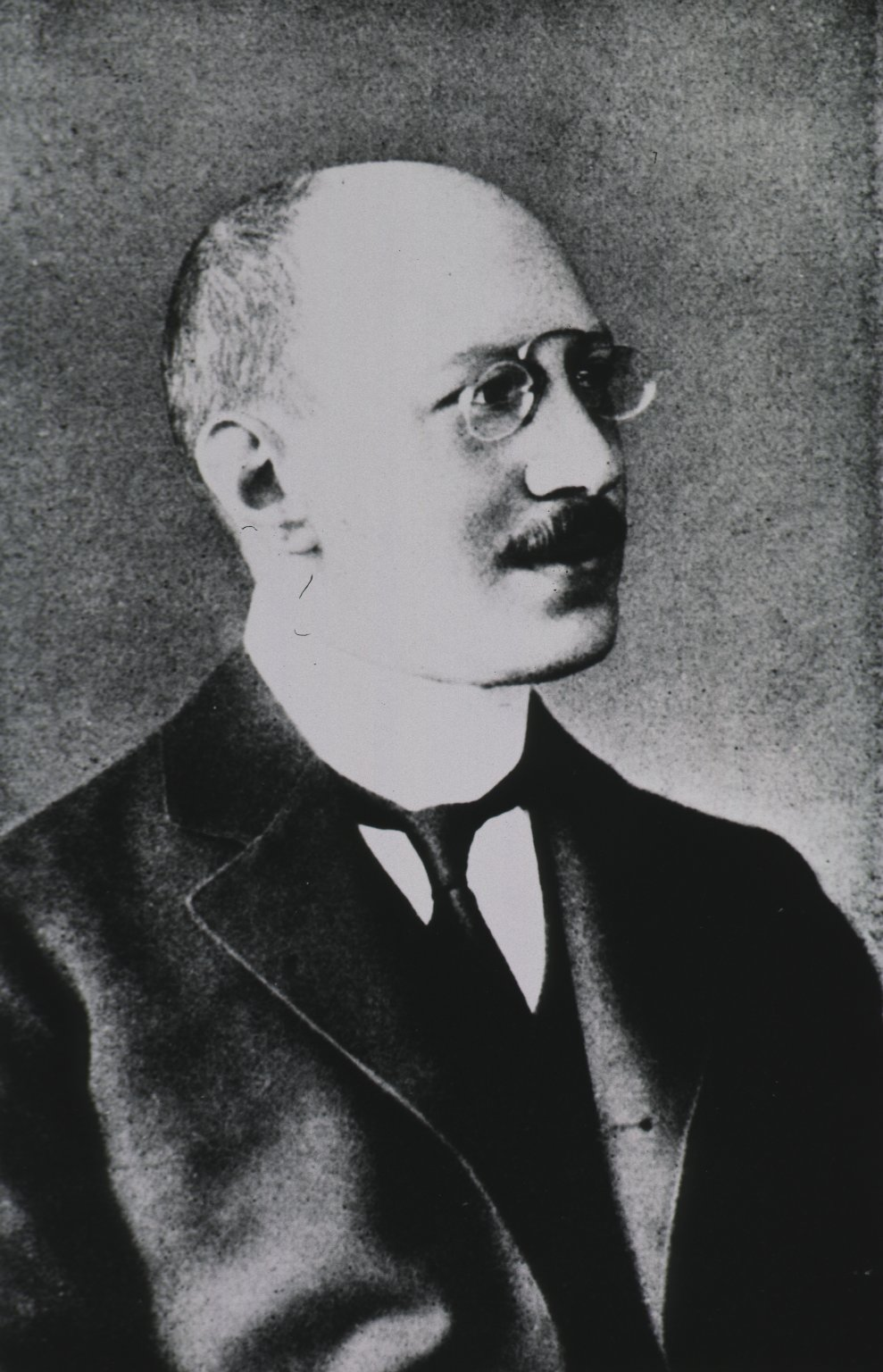
Iwan Bloch

Iwan Bloch (8 April 1872 – 21 November 1922), also known as Ivan Bloch, was a German dermatologist, and psychiatrist, psychoanalyst born in Delmenhorst, Grand Ducal Oldenburg, Germany, and often called the first sexologist.

Together with Magnus Hirschfeld and Albert Eulenburg, Bloch is known for having proposed the new concept of a science of sexuality (Sexualwissenschaft) or sexology. In 1906 he wrote in German the book Das Sexualleben unserer Zeit in seinen Beziehungen zur modernen Kultur which was translated as The Sexual Life of our Time in its Relations to Modern Civilization, a complete encyclopedia of the sexual sciences in their relation to modern civilization.

He is also known for having discovered the Marquis de Sade's manuscript of The 120 Days of Sodom, which had been believed to be lost, and published it under the pseudonym Eugen Dühren in 1904. He had previously published Marquis de Sade: his life and works. In 1899 under the same pseudonym, which he used later for the publishing of more works about Sade and Rétif de la Bretonne.

== Early life ==
Bloch came from a Jewish family. His father Louis Bloch (1846–1892) was a cattle dealer from Bassum who had a total of five children with his wife Rosa Lisette Rosette, née Meyer (1845–1921).

== Legacy ==
According to Sigmund Freud, Bloch's studies were instrumental in the development of the anthropological approach to the theory of sexuality. Before Bloch, homosexuality was analyzed using a pathological approach.

== Handbook of Sexology and other works ==
Iwan Bloch began the publication of his Handbuch der gesamten Sexualwissenschaft in Einzeldarstellungen ('Handbook of Sexology in its Entirety Presented in Separate Studies') in 1912. Three volumes appeared until the project was aborted because of Bloch's untimely death at age 50, in 1922.

- Handbuch der Gesamten Sexualwissenschaft in Einzeldarstellungen (Volumes 1 to 3: Louis Marcus, Berlin, 1912–25):
  - I. Die Prostitution. Hälfte 1 ['Prostitution: Part 1'] (1912)
  - II. Die Prostitution. Hälfte 2 ['Prostitution: Part 2'] with Georg Loewenstein was issued in Berlin by Louis Marcus in 1925
  - III. Die Homosexualität des Mannes und des Weibes ['Homosexuality in men and women']. (with Magnus Hirschfeld) (1914)

=== Other works ===
Many of Bloch's works were published under pseudonyms.

- Irrungen menschlicher Liebe (n.d., as "Veriphantor")
- Das Versehen der Frauen in Vergangenheit und Gegenwart und die Anschauungen der Aerzte, Naturforscher und Philosophen darüber (1899, as "Gerhard von Welsenburg")
- Der Marquis de Sade und seine Zeit. Ein Beitrag zur Cultur- und Sittengeschichte des 18. Jahrhunderts. Mit besonderer Beziehung auf die Lehre von der Psychopathia Sexualis (1900, as "Eugen Dühren". Barsdorf, Berlin, 1900; Max von Harrwitz, Berlin, 1904; 5. Aufl. Barsdorf, Berlin, 1915, in series: Studien zur Geschichte des menschlichen Geschlechtslebens Bd. 1.; Altogether 7 editions in his lifetime. Reissued in 1978: Heyne, München ISBN 3-453-50124-1)
- Der Ursprung der Syphilis. Eine medizinische und kulturgeschichtliche Untersuchung ['The origin of syphilis: A medical and historical investigation'] (G. Fischer, Jena, 1901)
- Beiträge zur Aetiologie der "Psychopathia sexualis" ['Contributions to the aetiology of "psychopathia sexualis"'] (Dohrn, Dresden, 1902)
- Das Geschlechtsleben in England, mit besonderer Beziehung auf London, Studien zur Geschichte des menschlichen Geschlechtslebens (as "Eugen Dühren") in four volumes:
  - I. Die beiden Erscheinungsformen des Sexuallebens. Die Ehe und die Prostitution.
  - II-III. Der Einfluss äusserer Faktoren auf das Geschlechtsleben in England. (M. Lilienthal, 1901–03.)
  - IV. Das Geschlechtsleben in England (3 vols. Berlin: H. Barsdorf)
- Der Fetischismus (1903, as "Veriphantor")
- Das erste Auftreten der Syphilis (Lustseuche) in der europäischen Kulturwelt. Gewürdigt in seiner weltgeschichtlichen Bedeutung, dargestellt nach Anfang, Verlauf und vorraussichtlichem Ende (Fischer, Jena, 1904)
- Rétif de la Bretonne. Der Mensch, der Schriftsteller, der Reformator ['Rétif de la Bretonne: The man, the writer, the reformer'] (Max Harrwitz, Berlin, 1906, as "Eugen Dühren")
- Rétif-Bibliothek. Verzeichnis der französischen und deutschen Ausgaben und Schriften von und über Nicolas Edme Restif de la Bretonne (bibliography of, Berlin, 1906, as "Eugen Dühren")
- Die sexuelle Osphresiologie (1906, as "Albert Hagen")
- Das Sexualleben unserer Zeit in seinen Beziehungen zur modernen Kultur ['The sexual life of our time in its relations to modern civilization'] (Louis Marcus, Verlagbuchhandlung, Berlin, 1907; English edition translated by Eden Paul, 1908) (this fundamental work appeared in many later editions)
- Englische Sittengeschichte (earlier: Das Geschlechtsleben in England) (Two volumes, 1912, as "Eugen Dühren")

Published after his death:

- Die Prostitution (the 2nd volume appeared posthumously in 1925)
- Anthropological Studies on the Strange Sexual Practices of All Races and All Ages (1933, reprint in 2001)
- A History of English Sexual Morals; (translated by William H. Forstern. London: Francis Aldor, 1936)
- Sexual Life in England, Past and Present (London: Alfred Aldor, 1938)
- in English (abridged): Marquis de Sade. His life and his works; (translated by James Bruce. Castle/ Book Sales, NY 1948, 128 pp.) (French and Spanish translations were also issued.)
- Neue Forschungen über den Marquis de Sade und seine Zeit. Mit besonderer Berücksichtigung der Sexualphilosophie de Sade's auf Grund des neuentdeckten Original-Manuskriptes seines Hauptwerkes (as "Eugen Dühren", reprint 1965; and again by VDM Verlag Dr. Müller, Saarbrücken, 2007)
- Projekt Gutenberg-DE: Bibliothek der Sexualwissenschaft 36 Klassiker als Faksimile auf DVD. Hille & Partner ISBN 978-3-86511-524-9
