= Marie-Laure de Noailles =

French art collector (1902–1970)

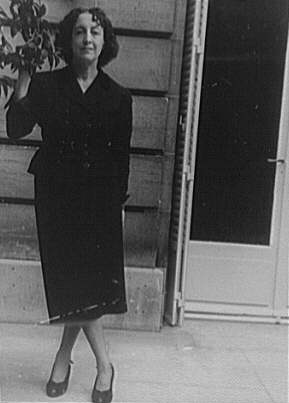
Marie-Laure de Noailles in 1949, photographed by Carl van Vechten

Marie-Laure Henriette Anne de Noailles, Vicomtesse de Noailles (French pronunciation: [maʁi lɔʁ ɑ̃ʁjɛt an də nɔaj vikɔ̃tɛs də nɔaj]; née Bischoffsheim; 31 October 1902 – 29 January 1970) was a French artist, regarded one of the 20th century's most daring and influential patrons of the arts, noted for her associations with Salvador Dalí, Balthus, Jean Cocteau, Ned Rorem, Man Ray, Luis Buñuel, Francis Poulenc, Wolfgang Paalen, Jean Hugo, Jean-Michel Frank and others as well as her tempestuous life and eccentric personality. She and her husband financed Ray's film Les Mystères du Château de Dé (1929), Poulenc's Aubade (1929), Buñuel and Dalí's film L'Âge d'Or (1930), and Cocteau's The Blood of a Poet (1930).

== Early life ==
She was born on 31 October 1902, the only child of Marie-Thérèse de Chevigné, a French aristocrat, and Maurice Bischoffsheim, a Paris banker of German Jewish and American Quaker descent. One of her 3x-great-grandfathers was the Marquis de Sade, and her maternal grandmother, Laure de Sade, Countess de Chevigné, inspired at least one character in Marcel Proust's In Search of Lost Time. Her nephew, Philippe Lannes de Montebello, was the director of the Metropolitan Museum of Art in New York City. Her stepfather was the French playwright Francis de Croisset, and her former sister-in-law, Jacqueline de Croisset, became the third wife of actor Yul Brynner.

== Personal life ==
In 1923, after a brief romance with the artist Jean Cocteau, Marie-Laure Bischoffsheim married Charles, Vicomte de Noailles (26 September 1891 – 28 April 1981). He was a son of François Joseph Eugène Napoléon de Noailles and the grandson of Antonin-Just-Léon-Marie de Noailles. His older brother was the 6th Duc de Mouchy, father of Philippe François Armand Marie de Noailles, himself a cadet of the French ducal house of Noailles. Together, the couple had two daughters:

- Laure Madeleine Thérèse Marie de Noailles, later known as Madame Bertrand de La Haye Jousselin (1924–1979);
- Nathalie Valentine Marie de Noailles, who married Alessandro Perrone (1927–2004).

Marie-Laure de Noailles and her husband moved to the fabled hôtel particulier at 11 Place des États-Unis in Paris, which was built by her grandfather, Bischoffsheim. Its interiors, which were redecorated in the 1920s by French minimalist designer Jean-Michel Frank, vanished in the 1980s, due to a subsequent owner's redecoration and remodeling. In 1936, she acquired Wolfgang Paalen´s object Chaise envahie de Lierre in André Breton´s Galerie Gradiva and decorated her bathroom with it. Today, the interiors have been renovated by Philippe Starck and house the Musée Baccarat and the headquarters of Baccarat, the crystal company.

In the 1920s, the Noailles built the Villa Noailles near Hyères. She had an affair with the young Igor Markevitch. In the 1950s, she had a long-term affair with the surrealist painter Óscar Domínguez.

Her portrait was painted by Salvador Dalí in an surrealist style c. 1932.

== Ancestors ==
Ancestors of Marie-Laure de Noailles

8. Jonathan-Raphaël Bisschoffsheim
4. Ferdinand-Raphaël Bischoffsheim
9. Henrietta Jette Goldschmidt
2. Maurice Jonathan Bischoffsheim
10. William Harris Paine
5. Mary Paine
11. Virginia Marilaa Withers
1. Marie Laure Henriette Bischoffsheim
12. Louis Marie Auguste de Chevigné
6. Adhéaume Marie Mériadec de Chevigné
13. Marie Angélique Herminie de Poterat
3. Marie Thérèse de Chevigné
14. Marie Antoine Auguste de Sade
7. Laure Marie Gabrielle de Sade
15. Charlotte Germaine de Maussion

== See also ==
- Duke of Noailles
