= Wolfenden (surname) =

- Pronunciation: English: /ˈwʌlfəndən/
- Language: English

Origin
- Language: English
- Meaning: "the valley of Wulfhelm"

Other names
- Variant form: Woolfenden

Wolfenden is a surname of Old English origin meaning 'the valley of Wulfhelm' and derives from the location or township of Wolfenden near Newchurch-in-Rossendale, Lancashire. Other variants include Woolfenden and Woffenden.

== Surname ==
- Chantel Louise Wolfenden (born 1986), Australian paralympic swimmer
- Christopher Wolfenden (born 1977), Canadian volleyball player
- Hugh Herbert Wolfenden (1892–1968), Canadian actuary and statistician
- Jacquie Sonia Durrell (née Wolfenden) (born 1929), British naturalist
- James Paine Wolfenden (1889–1949), United States congressman
- John Frederick Wolfenden (1906-1985), British educationalist and chair of the Wolfenden Report
- Jeremy Wolfenden (1934–1965), British journalist and spy
- Matthew Wolfenden (born 1987), British footballer
- Matthew Wolfenden (born 1980), British actor
- Richard Vance Wolfenden (born 1935), American biochemist
- Richard Norris Wolfenden (1854–1926), English physician and oceanographer
- Guy Anthony Woolfenden (1937–2016), English composer and conductor

== See also ==
- John Wolfenden, Baron Wolfenden (1906–1985), British educator and author of the Wolfenden Report (1957)
- Wolfenden (disambiguation)
- Woolfenden
