= Claire-Marie Hall =

Welsh-Filipina stage actress

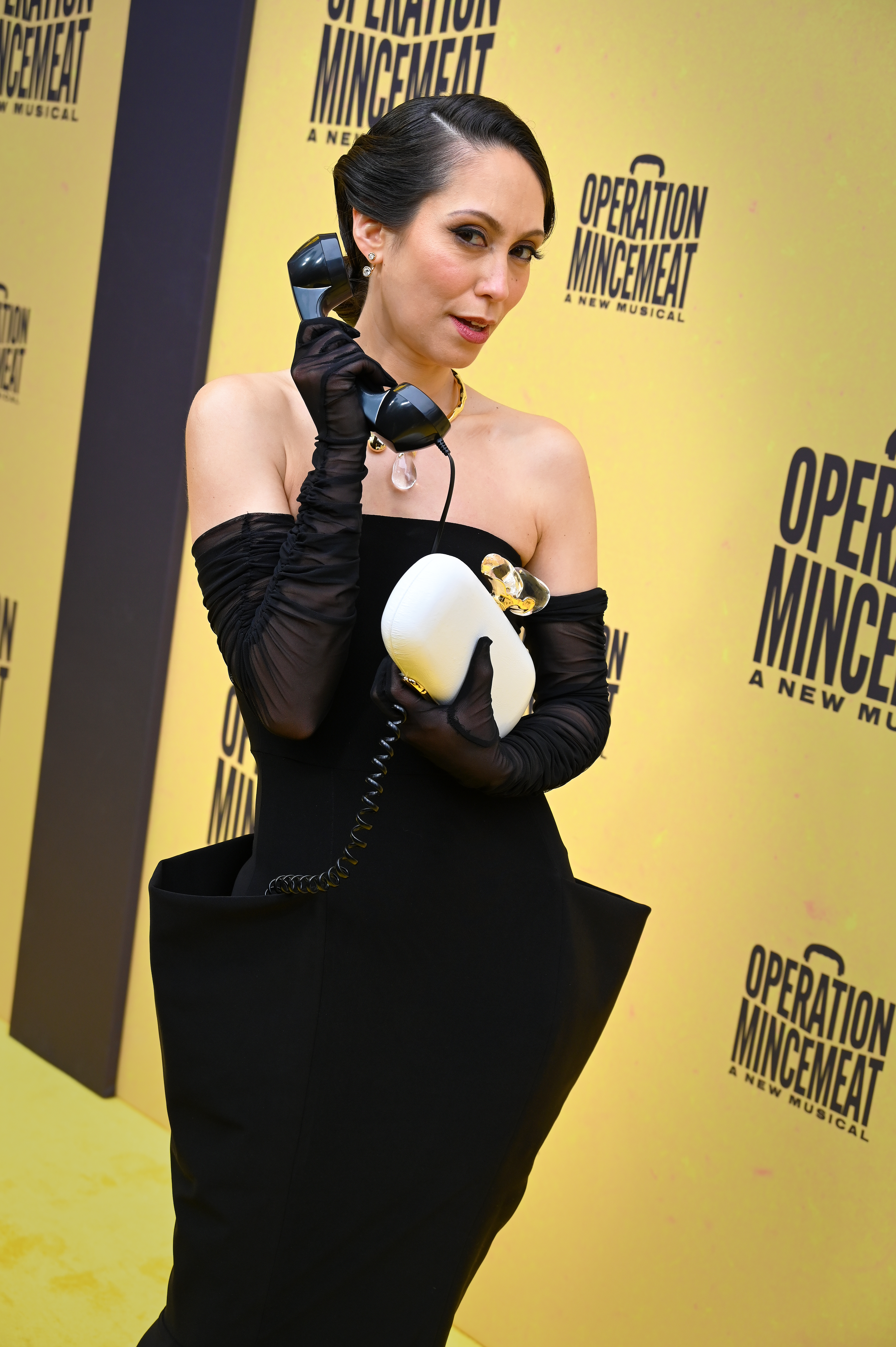
- Hall at the Broadway Opening Night of "Operation Mincemeat" in 2025
- Born: Newport, Wales
- Occupation: Stage actress
- Notable work: Operation Mincemeat
- Website: https://www.clairemariehall.com/

Claire-Marie Hall is a Welsh actress known for her roles on the West End and Broadway. She performed as "Jean Leslie & Others" in the Olivier and Tony award-winning musical Operation Mincemeat, where she originated the role in both the original West End production and the original Broadway production.

== Early life ==
Hall was born and raised in Rogerstone near Newport, Wales, where she attended St Davids Catholic School. Her mother, Florinda, is Filipina. In 1997, aged 11, she won the Argus Junior Talent Contest with a song-and-dance performance of songs from The Little Mermaid. As a prize, she received a year's scholarship to the Stagecoach Drama School in Newport and a day in a recording studio. That same year, Hall was cast as Ngana in an 11-day production of South Pacific at the New Theatre in Cardiff. She was declared the 1997 Champion Child for Music, a national children's award for music.

At age 14, Hall won a scholarship to the Sylvia Young Theatre School in London. She became the first student to be trained by Sylvia Young on a weekend-only basis, as she still attended Bassaleg Comprehensive School in Newport, Wales on weekdays.

At 15, she was cast in Aladdin at the Congress Theatre, and at 17, she played a lead role in Jack and the Beanstalk at Blackwood Miners Institute.

She was a 2003 top-four finalist in the BBC talent show Just Up Your Street, where she was the youngest contestant on the show. At the age of 18, she moved to London to attend the Mountview Academy of Theatre Arts.

== Career ==
Three weeks after graduating from Mountview, Hall was cast as Cosette in the Sondheim Theatre (then named Queen's Theatre) production of Les Misérables, marking her West End debut. She later was cast as Gabriella Montez in the 2008 High School Musical Live on Stage at Hammersmith Apollo, and as Tuptim in The King and I, before taking a hiatus from the West End. In March 2020, Hall was cast as The Inkeeper's Wife in the premiere of The Wicker Husband at the Watermill Theatre, which closed after five performances due to the COVID-19 pandemic.

Hall joined the cast of Operation Mincemeat in 2020, taking over the role of "Jean Leslie & Others" from Rory Furey-King, who originated the role in the original off-West End production. She remained in the role when the production transferred to the West End in 2023, and again when the production transferred to Broadway in 2025.

In 2026, Thespians: Greece The Musical (But Not That One) announced their full casting list, with Hall as Poly.

== Personal life ==
Hall is married to theatre set designer Bob Sterrett. She is Welsh-Filipina.
