= Jean Bourgoint =

French socialite and Cistercian monk (1905–1966)

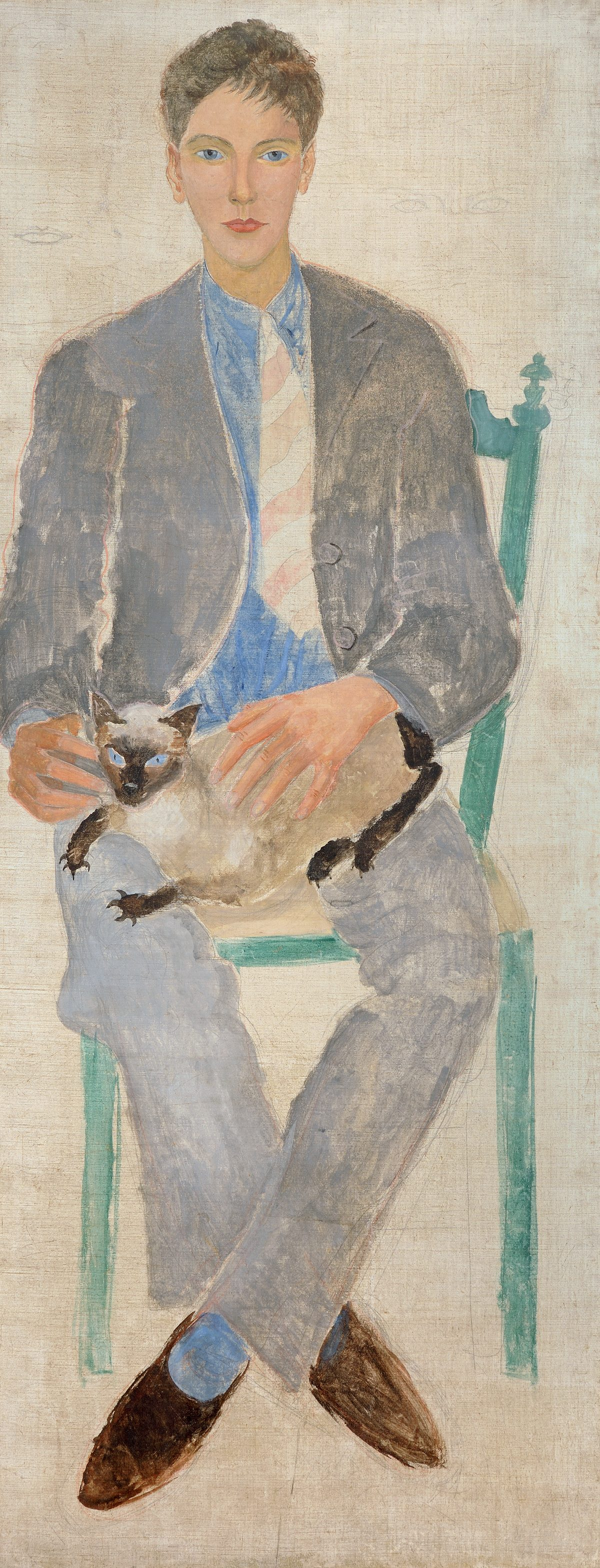
- Portrait of Jean Bourgoint by Christopher Wood
- Born: June 25, 1905; Montmartre, Paris, France
- Died: March 11, 1966 (aged 60); Garoua, Cameroon
- Resting place: Garoua, Cameroon
- Other name: Jeannot
- Occupations: Socialite; Artist; Model; Cistercian monk; Designer
- Years active: 1920 – 1966
- Known for: Inspiration for Les Enfants Terribles
- Partner: Jean Cocteau (1920–1925)
- Relatives: Jeanne Bourgoint (sister)

Jean Bourgoint (25 June 1905 – 11 March 1966), known in religious life as Brother Pascal, was a French socialite, artist, and designer who became a prominent figure in the bohemian circles of interwar Paris. He and his sister, Jeanne Bourgoint, served as the primary inspirations for the central characters in Jean Cocteau's 1929 novel, Les Enfants Terribles. Following a series of personal tragedies and a spiritual conversion influenced by Neo-Thomism, he entered the Cistercians and spent his final years serving in a leper colony in Cameroon.

== Early life and parisian years ==
Bourgoint was born in the 9th arrondissement of Paris on rue Rodier. From 1922, he became a fixture of the Parisian avant-garde, frequenting the nightclub Le Bœuf sur le toit. During this period, he lived in an intense, secluded domestic arrangement with his sister Jeanne. This unconventional sibling bond, characterized by shared games and a withdrawal from the outside world, fascinated their close friend Jean Cocteau.

In 1925, Bourgoint met the philosopher Jacques Maritain and was baptized into the Catholic Church in the Maritain family's private chapel in Meudon. Despite this spiritual awakening, he remained deeply embedded in the social scene, often consuming opium with Cocteau and other members of their circle.

== Career ==
=== Fine Art and textile design ===
He operated as a working artist and decorative designer during his years in Paris. Bourgoint produced his own fine art. His portfolio largely consisted of delicate, figurative sketches, watercolor paintings, and portraits that mirrored the minimalist, fluid linework style popular in Cocteau's immediate social circle. A small number of his surviving original drawings are traded through fine art auction houses.

Gifted with a strong sense of aesthetic style, Bourgoint worked in the decorative arts, creating patterns and custom textile designs. His visual sensibilities allowed him to conceptualize fashion layouts and fabric illustrations, operating briefly within the intersection of the Paris fashion and art worlds.

=== Muse to Jean Cocteau ===
Bourgoint met Jean Cocteau when he was sixteen, beginning an intimate relationship and shared struggle with opium addiction. The intense, secluded world the siblings inhabited inspired the main characters in Cocteau's famous novel, Les Enfants Terribles. He quickly evolved into one of Cocteau's most significant conceptual and visual muses.

=== Inspiration for Les Enfants Terribles ===
The tragic death of his sister Jeanne by suicide in 1929 profoundly affected Bourgoint. Following a split from Cocteau and the suicide of his sister Jeanne in 1929, Bourgoint suffered deep personal loss. This event coincided with the publication of Cocteau's Les Enfants Terribles, in which the characters Paul and Élisabeth were modeled directly after Jean and Jeanne. The novel's portrayal of a doomed, insular sibling relationship solidified Bourgoint's reputation as the "enfant terrible" of the era. He was also a frequent subject for artists, most notably in Christopher Wood's 1926 portrait, Boy with Cat.

=== Religious life ===
Between 1930 and 1946, Bourgoint lived a transient life, often staying with the artist Jean Hugo at the Mas de Fourques. Under the spiritual direction of Father Alex-Ceslas Rzewuski, he sought a more disciplined religious path.

On 24 December 1947, Bourgoint entered the Cîteaux Abbey as a lay brother, taking the name Brother Pascal. He remained at Cîteaux for seventeen years, during which time he engaged in extensive correspondence with Maritain and Hugo, exploring themes of poverty and "lost time" (le temps perdu).

=== Mission to Cameroon ===
In 1964, following the deaths of his mentors Raïssa Maritain and Jean Cocteau, Bourgoint experienced a vocational crisis. Seeking a more radical expression of his faith, he departed for Africa, eventually settling at a leper colony in Mokolo, Cameroon. Inspired by the example of Charles de Foucauld, he dedicated himself to the care of those suffering from leprosy, famously referring to his mission as seeking "a kiss for the leper".

== Personal life ==
Following their meeting in 1920, Bourgoint and Jean Cocteau formed an intense bond and were lovers. However, the relationship underwent a severe rift between 1925 and 1926. While Bourgoint's burgeoning religious devotion alienated him from Cocteau's secular lifestyle, heavy friction also arose from Bourgoint's sister, Jeanne.

Jeanne Bourgoint, a highly successful and beautiful Parisian fashion model, maintained a fiercely protective, codependent relationship with her brother. She deeply disapproved of Cocteau's influence, particularly after Cocteau introduced Bourgoint to opium. Jeanne grew resentful as her brother quickly spiraled into a severe drug addiction.

Tragically, despite her initial resistance to the drug's destructive impact on her brother, Jeanne herself eventually became entangled in the same opium-fueled bohemian lifestyle. The shared addiction exacerbated the siblings' insular, claustrophobic domestic life, creating a toxic cycle of substance abuse. This downward spiral ultimately culminated in Jeanne's suicide in the early 1930s, an event that devastated Bourgoint and solidified his decision to permanently abandon Paris for a life of monastic ascetism.

== Death ==
Bourgoint died of cancer in Garoua on 11 March 1966. According to his final wishes, he was buried in Cameroon.

== Bibliography ==
- Bourgoint, Jean. Le Retour de l'enfant terrible: Lettres 1923-1966. Edited by Georges Lauris. Paris: Desclée de Brouwer, 1975.

== See also ==
- Jean Cocteau
- Jacques Maritain
- Les Enfants Terribles
