= Congress Theatre =

Congress Theatre may refer to:

- Congress Theatre (Torfaen)
- Congress Theatre (Eastbourne)
- Congress Theater, Chicago
