= Thespians: Greece The Musical (But Not That One) =

Thespians
- Greece The Musical (But Not That One)
- Music: Ed Zanders
- Lyrics: Jonathan Sayer; Ed Zanders
- Book: Jonathan Sayer
- Setting: Greece; 534 BC
- Premiere: 9 May 2026: Mercury Theatre, Colchester

Thespians: Greece The Musical (But Not That One) is a stage musical comedy produced by Mischief Theatre. The story takes place in 534 G.C. in Greece and follows a group of bards who accidentally invent acting during a prayer competition.

== Production history ==
Thespians was written by Jonathan Sayer and Ed Zanders, marking the first musical produced by Mischief Theatre Company. It will be presented in collaboration between HOME Manchester, Mercury Theatre Colchester, and JPT Productions. In April 2026, a full cast list was announced in addition to the creative team, including director Robyn Grant, designer Jasmine Swan, choreographer Melody Sinclair-Marsh, lighting designer David Howe, and sound designer Nick Lodge.

The production toured the United Kingdom for 12 weeks, premiering on 9 May 2026 at the Mercury Theatre, Colchester.

== Cast and characters ==
Character	UK tour
Character	2026
Thespis	James Spence
Poly	Claire-Marie Hall
Atlas	Luke Latchman
Melampus	Mia Jerome
Adonis	Marc Pickering
Bard	Matt Cavendish
Rhapsodes	Allie Dart
The Tyrant	Rhys Taylor
Ensemble	Ashley Tucker; Curtis Patrick; Josh Patel-Foster
