= Jeanne Bourgoint =

French fashion model and bohemian socialite (1903–1929)

- Born: 1903; Montmartre, Paris, France
- Died: December 24, 1929 (aged 25–26); Paris, France
- Other names: Mademoiselle Bourgoint; Mlle Bourgoint
- Occupations: Fashion model; Socialite; Muse
- Years active: 1918–1929
- Known for: Inspiration for Élisabeth in Les Enfants terribles
- Partner: Christopher Wood (1926–1927)
- Relatives: Jean Bourgoint (brother); Maxime Bourgoint (twin brother)

Jeanne Bourgoint (1903 – December 24, 1929) was a French fashion model, muse, and bohemian socialite in interwar Paris. She and her younger brother, the artist and designer Jean Bourgoint, are best remembered as the primary real-life inspirations behind the central characters in Jean Cocteau's celebrated 1929 avant-garde novel, Les Enfants terribles.

Known for her striking and modern androgynous aesthetic, Bourgoint was a regular figure in Paris's artistic circle during the 1920s. She served as a muse to influential creators of the era, including the English modernist painter Christopher Wood. Her turbulent life and sudden death by suicide on Christmas Eve 1929 profoundly impacted the French avant-garde and permanently altered the life of her brother.

== Early life and Parisian bohemianism ==
Jeanne Bourgoint was born in Paris on Rue Rodier in the 9th arrondissement. She grew up alongside her twin brother, Maxime, and her younger brother, Jean Bourgoint. Following the death of their mother, Jeanne and Jean developed an intensely insular, codependent, and eccentric lifestyle. The siblings shared an apartment and a singular bedroom, effectively retreating into a private psychological universe that was isolated from the outside world.

By the early 1920s, the siblings had entered the vibrant nightlife of the Parisian avant-garde, becoming regulars at the famous nightclub Le Bœuf sur le toit. During this period, Jeanne worked as a fashion model. She famously embraced the garçonne look of the Roaring Twenties, characterized by her slender build and tightly-cropped hair, which directly challenged traditional feminine style conventions. Alongside her brother, she also experimented heavily with opium, a substance that pervaded their immediate social circles.

== Career ==
=== Muse and artistic impact ===
In February 1923, the Bourgoint siblings met the multi-disciplinary artist and writer Jean Cocteau. Cocteau became deeply voyeuristic regarding their claustrophobic sibling dynamic and the chaotic, theatrical sanctuary of their shared bedroom. This real-life environment served as the direct operational model for the hyper-intense, psychological setting of Cocteau's classic novel Les Enfants terribles (1929). In the text, the character of Élisabeth is an overt literary portrait of Jeanne, while her brother Jean is reflected in the character of Paul.

Beyond literature, Bourgoint was a significant visual muse. She was a lover and frequent model for the bisexual English modernist painter Christopher Wood. Wood immortalized her progressive, androgynous appearance across several prominent works.

Woods made a "Portrait of Mademoiselle Bourgoint" a detailed pencil and watercolor sketch emphasizing her sharp, modern bob and striking features. Later he painted another painting of Jeanne "Mme Bourgoint (Woman with Fox)" a stark, melancholic oil painting completed in the final year of her life, pairing Jeanne with a fox to symbolize her untamed and fiercely individualistic temperament.

== Death ==
On December 24, 1929—only months after Cocteau published Les Enfants terribles—Jeanne Bourgoint committed suicide in Paris while in her mid-twenties. Observers and biographers of the era noted that the tragic nature of her suicide heavily mirrored the literary fate of her fictional counterpart, Élisabeth, who takes her own life in the novel's dramatic climax.

== Legacy ==
Her sudden death shattered the Bourgoint household and heavily traumatized her inner circle. Traumatized by the loss of his sister, Jean completely abandoned the Parisian high life. Influenced by philosopher Jacques Maritain, he underwent a deep spiritual conversion, eventually entering the Cistercian (Trappist) Order as Brother Pascal. He spent his final decades working selflessly in an African leper colony in Garoua, Cameroon. In 1950, director Jean-Pierre Melville adapted Cocteau's novel into the landmark film Les Enfants terribles. The character of Élisabeth, modeled directly on Jeanne, was portrayed by the French actress Nicole Stéphane.

== See also ==
- Jean Bourgoint
- Jean Cocteau
- Christopher Wood
- Les Enfants Terribles
