= Consenting Adults (2007 film) =

2007 British television film

- Genre: Drama
- Written by: Julian Mitchell
- Directed by: Richard Curson Smith
- Starring: Charles Dance; Sean Biggerstaff; Samantha Bond; Mel Smith
- Country of origin: United Kingdom
- Original language: English

Production
- Running time: 75 minutes

Original release
- Network: BBC Four
- Release: 5 September 2007

Consenting Adults is a 2007 BBC Four television film which portrays the events of the Wolfenden Committee, chaired by Sir John Wolfenden. The film is set in the 1950s and depicts social attitudes towards homosexuality in Britain at that time, while also focusing on Wolfenden and his homosexual son Jeremy Wolfenden.

The Committee first met on 15 September 1954 and published its report on 4 September 1957, recommending that "homosexual behaviour between consenting adults in private should no longer be a criminal offence". The report led to the passage of the Sexual Offences Act 1967, which partially decriminalised homosexuality in England and Wales.

The film was commissioned as part of a season of programming marking the 40th anniversary of the partial decriminalisation of homosexuality in England and Wales in 1967.

== Cast ==
- Charles Dance as John Wolfenden
- Sean Biggerstaff as Jeremy Wolfenden
- David Bamber as Dr Carl Winter
- Samantha Bond as Jill Wolfenden
- Dallas Campbell as Sergeant Harry
- Mark Gatiss as Police Constable Butcher
- Haydn Gwynne as Mary Cohen
- Paul Kendrick as Clive
- Jamie Martin as Colin Parker
- Charles Reston as Michael
- Matt Ryan as Charley Bullard
- Mel Smith as Maxwell Fyfe
- Tim Wallers as Spellman
- Colin Stinton as Alfred Kinsey

== Reception ==
The film was nominated for BAFTA Scotland's Best Drama Award, and at the ceremony on 18 November 2007, Sean Biggerstaff won BAFTA Scotland's Award for Best Actor (Television).
