= Enzo Cosimi =

Italian choreographer

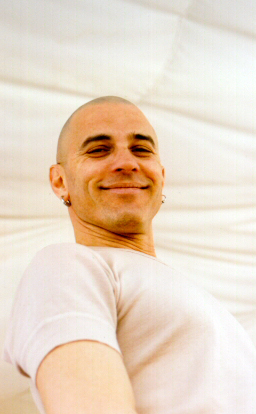
- Born: Rome, Italy
- Occupation: choreographer
- Years active: 1982–present
- Website: http://www.enzocosimi.com/

Enzo Cosimi is an Italian choreographer. In 1987 he made his debut in the United States with a work accompanied by music from the Italian composer Pierluigi Castellano.

== Biography ==
Enzo Cosimi began studying classical and modern dance in his hometown, then went on to perfect his skills at the Mudra Center created by Maurice Béjart in Brussels and later in New York at the Merce Cunningham Dance Studio.Returning to Italy in the early 1980s, he immediately made a name for himself with his first creation, Calore (1982), which propelled him to the forefront of young Italian dance, and he created his own company, Occhèsc. Guest choreographer for La Scala in Milan and the Teatro Comunale in Florence, over the years he has created productions with his company for the Teatro Comunale in Ferrara, the Venice Biennale, RED Reggio Emilia danza, the Teatro Ponchielli in Cremona, the Auditorium – Parco della Musica in Rome, the RomaEuropa Festival, the Arken Museum of Modern Art Museum of Contemporary Art in Copenhagen, the Centre Pompidou, and other important Italian and international cultural institutions. He collaborates with exceptional figures such as Miuccia Prada, Luigi Veronesi, Richie Hawtin, Giorgio Cattani, Aldo Tilocca, Louis Bacalov, Aldo Busi, Luca Spagnoletti, Daniela Dal Cin, Robert Lippok, and Fabrizio Plessi, with whom he created Sciame, the first Italian video dance work. In 2006, he directed and choreographed the opening ceremony of the XX Olympic Winter Games in Turin, featuring Roberto Bolle and 250 performers. In March 2012, Calore, Enzo Cosimi's first work within the RIC.CI. Project curated by Marinella Guatterini, was restaged. Also in 2012, he created a choreography for the National Academy of Dance and for the Paolo Grassi Civic School in Milan. During his career, he has staged more than thirty productions with his company, including Welcome to my world, presented in May 2014 at NID, the Italian dance platform in Pisa.

In June 2014, he presented his new creation Sopra di me il diluvio (Above Me the Flood) at the Venice Biennale.Over the years, the creations of the Enzo Cosimi Company have been performed in major Italian theaters and festivals, and toured in France, Germany, England, Spain, the former Yugoslavia, Austria, Switzerland, Greece, Denmark, the United States (DTW in New York, Charleston, Spoleto-USA), Peru, Australia, and India. In 2009, he created the choreography for the film Lo Spazio Bianco, directed by Francesca Comencini, which was presented at the 66th Venice Film Festival.

== Achievements ==
Cosimi is most known for collaborating with DJ Richie Hawtin to create a piece called "9.20" for the 2006 Winter Olympics Opening Ceremony.
