= Luba Mirella =

Italian opera singer

Luba Mirella

Luba (or Ljuba) Mirella (née Ljuba Wagenheim; 13 April 1894, in Rostov – 4 March 1972, in Milan) was an Italian coloratura soprano of Polish descent. Her name is sometimes given in cast lists as Mirella Luba and Mirella Lubov.

== Biography ==
Luba Mirella was born in Rostov to a Jewish family of Polish musicians who emigrated to Italy during the First World War. Her parents were Alessandro Wagenheim and Rosa Brozgol. She was a cousin of Raïssa Maritain on her mother's side.

She is believed to have made her debut in Russia and subsequently enjoyed a successful career in Italy, appearing widely in the province as well as at the principal opera houses. Her best role on stage was considered Musetta in Giacomo Puccini's La bohème, and she sang this part with great success at the Teatro Regio di Parma, Teatro Regio di Torino, Teatro Comunale di Bologna and, notably, the Teatro alla Scala in Milan in 1935. At La Scala Mirella also appeared in the 1940/1941 season in Richard Strauss's opera Die Frau ohne Schatten. Outside Italy, she made appearances at the Teatro Liceo in Barcelona (in 1929, as Musetta, Micaëla in Bizet's Carmen, Nedda in Ruggero Leoncavallo's Pagliacci as well as in parts in Russian operas), Teatro Nacional de São Carlos in Lisbon (in 1926, as Musetta and Micaëla) and the Zürich Opera House (in 1931, as Musetta).

She died in 1972 at the Casa di Riposo per Musicisti, where she had lived since 1958. She was buried in Cimitero di Viarigi, Italy.

== Discography ==
Mirella recorded for Odeon and Columbia, including two complete operas on the latter label (Musetta in Puccini's La bohème in 1928 and Olga Sukarev in Giordano's Fedora in 1931 ). For Odeon Mirella recorded excerpts from Leoncavallo's Pagliacci, arias and duets by Bellini, Bizet and Rossini and a few songs.
