= Jim Spence =

Jim Spence may refer to:

- Jim Spence (broadcaster), Scottish sports broadcaster
- Jim Spence (loyalist) (born 1960), Northern Irish former loyalist activist

== See also ==
- James Spence (disambiguation)
