= Institutional dichotomy =

Institutional dichotomy, according to John Wolfenden (responsible for the Wolfenden Report), in his essay The Gap — The Bridge, states that the dichotomization of intellectual disciplines by educational institutions, specifically collegiate institutions, is to blame for the communication gap between specialists in different fields.

Forced to pursue contrasting disciplines in college, students diverge from the broad educational background established in high school, and pursue narrower studies. As a result, these students lose contact with the shared basis of their education as they venture into separate abstract studies. In effect, the communication gap of collegiate students widens as they become saturated with a curriculum of abstractions that relate to a single area of study.

For instance, a college freshman chooses mathematics as his field of study while another chooses English. As they study, the two students become grossly out of touch as they adapt to new languages which will soon serve as a code in their future careers. The mathematics student becomes consumed by symbols and numbers while the English student immerses himself in a sea of classical literary styles and grammatical mechanics. Consequently, the students soon become ill-equipped to communicate with each other. The mathematics student now becomes "illiterate" by standards of the English major and the English major becomes "innumerate" by standards of the mathematics major.

Because knowledge is increasing, some fragmentation of disciplines is inevitable. The problem with fragmentation is that students are forced to live in ignorance of studies outside of their fields.

== See also ==
- The Two Cultures and the Scientific Revolution by C. P. Snow, 1959
