= Christopher Wood (painter) =

English painter (1901–1930)

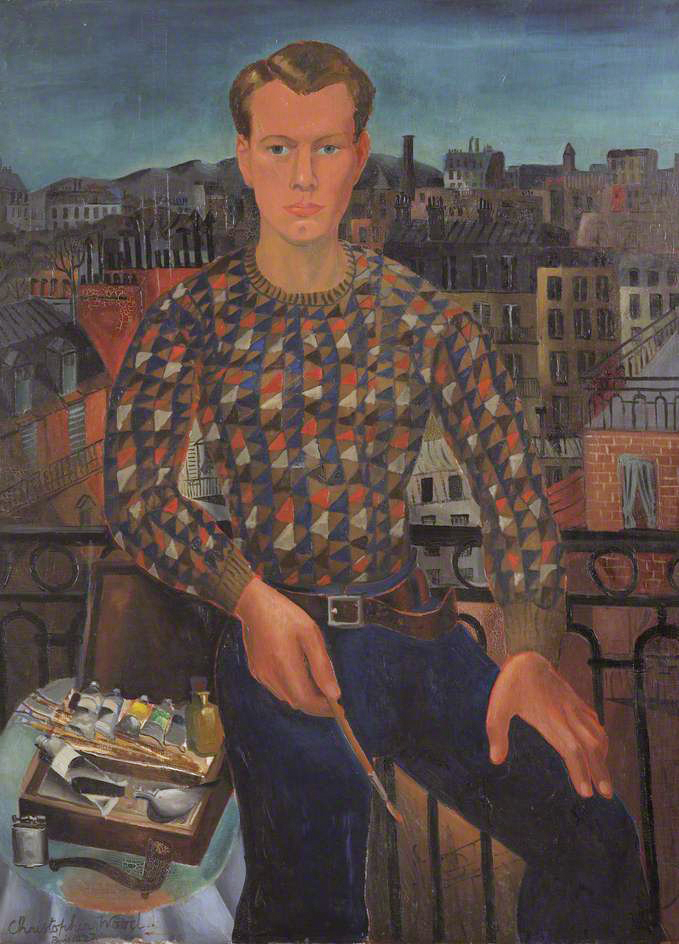
- Self portrait (1927), in the permanent collection of Kettle's Yard, Cambridge, England
- Born: John Christopher Wood; 7 April 1901; Knowsley, Liverpool, England
- Died: 21 August 1930 (aged 29); Salisbury, Wiltshire, England
- Resting place: Church of All Saints, Broad Chalke, Wiltshire, England
- Known for: Painting
- Movement: Post-Impressionism; Primitivism
- Partner: Jeanne Bourgoint (1926–1927)

John Christopher "Kit" Wood (7 April 1901 – 21 August 1930) was an English painter born in Knowsley, near Liverpool.

== Biography ==
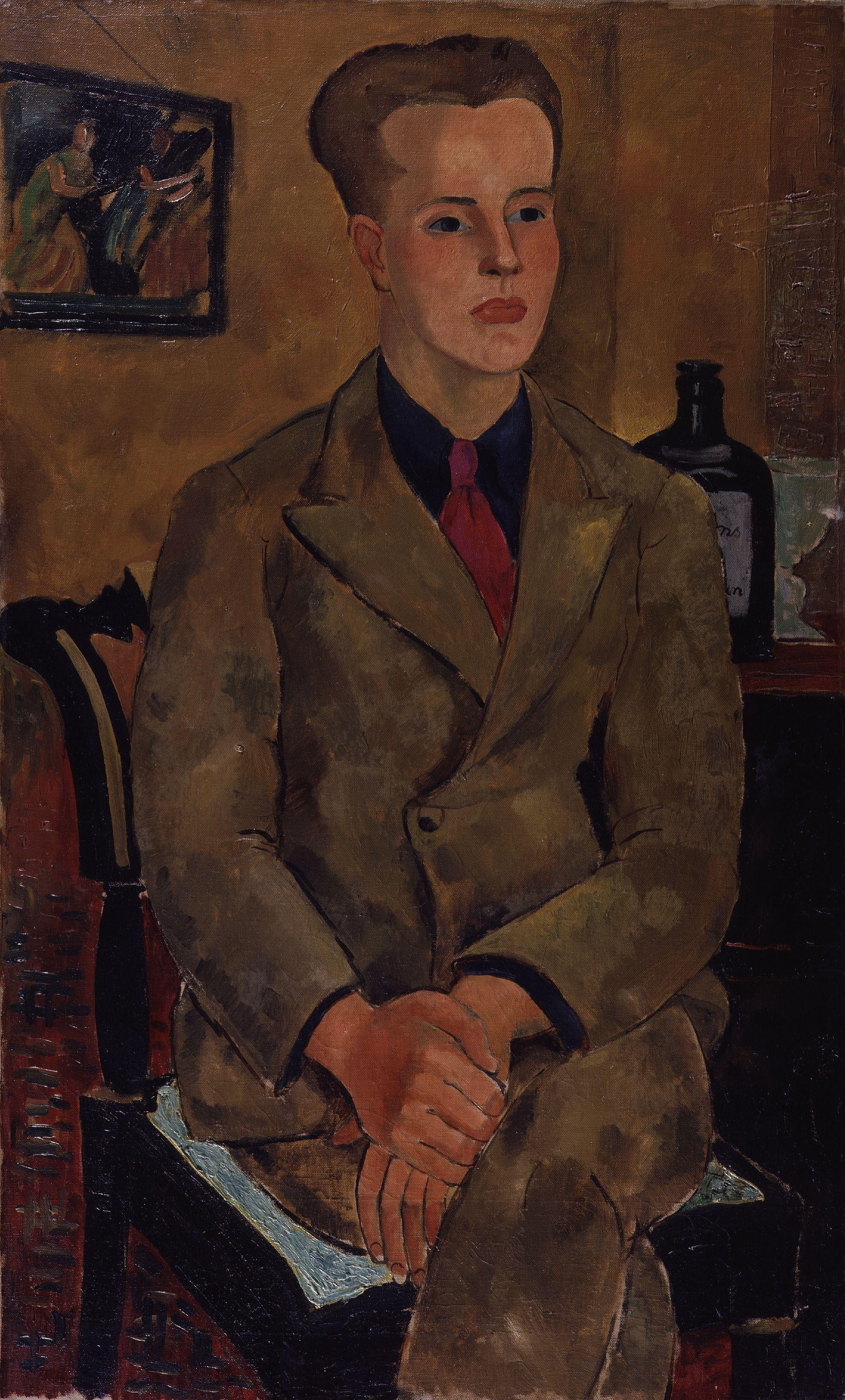
A 1926 portrait by Christopher Wood of Constant Lambert in the permanent collection of the National Portrait Gallery, London

=== Early life ===
Christopher Wood was born in Knowsley to Doctor Lucius and Clare Wood. He was educated at Marlborough College in Wiltshire, then briefly flirted with medicine and architecture at Liverpool University before pursuing an artistic career.

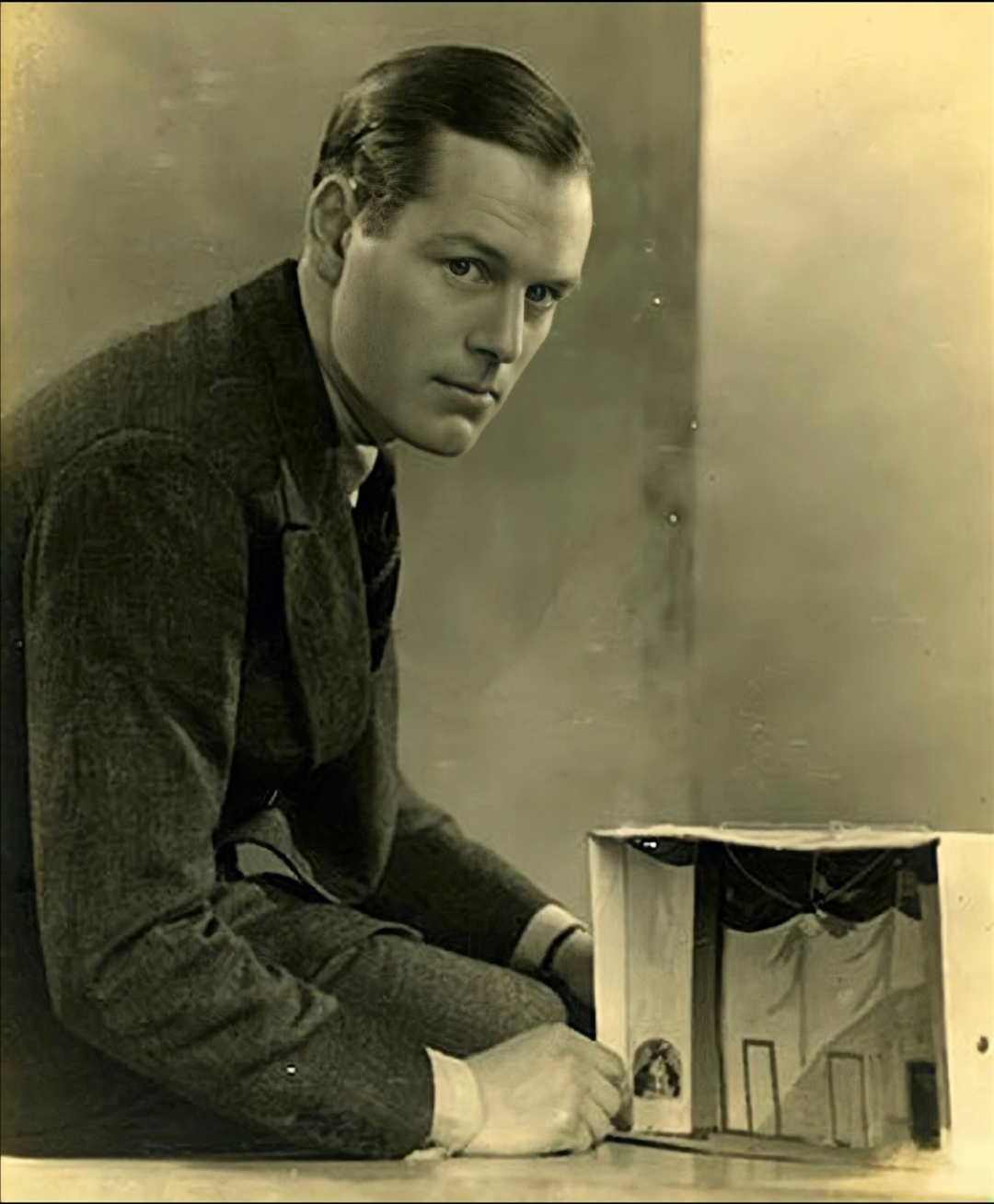
Christopher Wood

=== Artistic career ===
At Liverpool University, Wood met Augustus John, who encouraged him to be a painter. The French collector Alphonse Kahn invited him to Paris in 1920. From 1921 he trained as a painter at the Académie Julian in Paris, where he met Picasso, Jean Cocteau, Georges Auric and Diaghilev. He travelled around Europe and north Africa between 1922 and 1924.

By the 1920s his father was running a general practice in Broad Chalke, Wiltshire, and Wood painted a series of canvases there including Cottage in Broadchalke, Anemones in a Window, Broadchalke, and The Red Cottage, Broadchalke.

In 1926, Wood created designs for Constant Lambert's 1925 Romeo and Juliet for Diaghilev's Ballets Russes, although they were never used. The same year he became a member of both the London Group and the Seven and Five Society plus meeting and befriending Ben and Winifred Nicholson. The Nicholsons' dedication to his work had a great influence and they exhibited together at the Beaux Arts Gallery in April–May 1927 and subsequently painted together in Cumberland and Cornwall in 1928. Like Nicholson, Wood admired Alfred Wallis whom they met on a trip to St Ives, and whose primitivism influenced Woods' stylistic development.

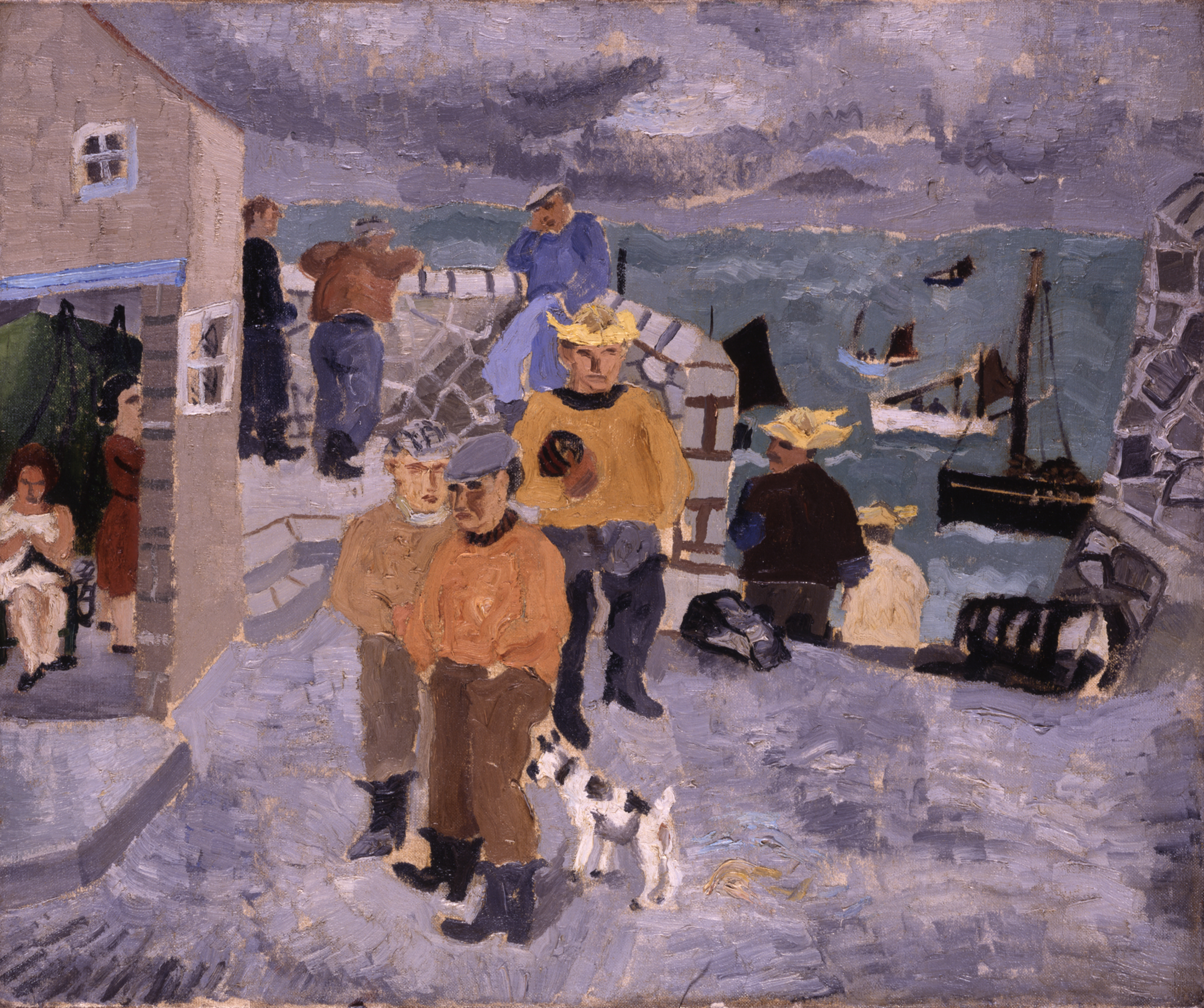
Christopher Wood (1901-1930) - Cornish Fishermen, The Quay, St Ives - ABDAG000003 - Aberdeen City Council (Archives, Gallery and Museums Collection)

He painted coastal scenes, and his finest works are considered to be those painted in Brittany in 1929 and during his second trip to Brittany in 1930 when he painted fewer marine pictures and more churches. He claimed that his "mother's people were Cornish and that he got his love of the sea and for boats from his Cornish ancestry".

In April 1929, Wood held a solo exhibition at Tooth's Gallery in Bond Street, London where he met Lucy Wertheim at a private view. She purchased a picture and soon became one of his biggest supporters, buying up his work. For his part Wood apparently appreciated the support, telling Wertheim at her birthday party that:

I know that my future as a painter from now on will be bound up with your own, and I shall become great through you!

In May 1930, he had a largely unsuccessful exhibition with Nicholson at the Georges Bernheim Gallery in Paris. In June and July he made a second sojourn to Brittany to create new work. Later in July Wertheim travelled to meet Wood in Paris, to choose the paintings for a one-man show that would be the opening exhibition at her new Wertheim Gallery in October. While discussing the exhibition over lunch the day after her arrival, Wood issued her with an ultimatum: "I want you to promise to guarantee me twelve hundred pounds a year from the time of my exhibition, one hundred pounds a month being the least I can live on. If I can't have this sum I've made up my mind to shoot myself". When she complained, he begged her forgiveness, and they went to review the paintings again. Following his death in August the show was cancelled; it was eventually staged as a memorial show at another gallery.

=== Personal life ===
Wood was bisexual. In the early summer of 1921, Wood met José Antonio Gandarillas Huici (1887–1970), a Chilean diplomat who was the only son of Chilean Senator José Antonio Gandarillas and his wife Rosa, sister of Eugenia Errázuriz. Gandarillas, a married homosexual fourteen years older than Wood, lived a glamorous life partly financed by gambling. Their relationship lasted through Wood's life, surviving his affair with Jeanne Bourgoint. In 1927 his plans to elope and marry heiress Meraud Guinness were frustrated by her parents whereupon he required emotional support from Winifred Nicholson. (Meraud went on to marry Chilean painter Álvaro Guevara in 1929.) Wood also had a liaison with a Russian émigrée, Frosca Munster, whom he met in 1928.

=== Death and commemoration ===
By 1930, painting frantically in preparation for his Wertheim exhibition in London, Wood became psychotic and began carrying a revolver. On 21 August, he travelled to meet his mother and sister for lunch at The County Hotel in Salisbury and to show them a selection of his latest paintings. After saying goodbye, he jumped under a train at Salisbury railway station, although in deference to his mother's wishes, it was reported as an accident.

Christopher Wood is buried in the churchyard of All Saints Church in Broad Chalke. His gravestone was carved by fellow artist and sculptor Eric Gill.

Although his planned exhibition at the Wertheim gallery was cancelled on his death, a posthumous exhibition was held in February 1931. This was followed by an exhibition at the Lefevre Gallery in 1932.

The 1938 Venice Biennale included some of his paintings, and later the Redfern Gallery (part of the New Burlington Galleries) compiled a major retrospective.

== Bibliography ==
- Alfred Wallis, Christopher Wood, Ben Nicholson. Scottish Arts Council, 1987. ISBN 0-85031-849-1
- Button, Virginia. Christopher Wood. London: Tate, 2003. ISBN 1-85437-466-4
- Cariou, Andre. Christopher Wood: A Painter Between Two Cornwalls. London: Tate, 1996. ISBN 1-85437-224-6
- Faulks, Sebastian. The Fatal Englishman: Three Short Lives: Christopher Wood, Richard Hillary, Jeremy Wolfenden. London: Hutchinson, 1996.
- Ingleby, Richard. Christopher Wood: An English Painter. London: Allison & Busby, 1995. ISBN 0-85031-849-1 (hard) ISBN 0-7490-0263-8 (paper)
- Mason, William. Christopher Wood: The Minories, Colchester. London: Arts Council, 1979. ISBN 0-7287-0192-8
- Nicholson, Jovan. Art and Life: Ben Nicholson, Winifred Nicholson, Christopher Wood, Alfred Wallis, William Staite Murray, 1920-1931. London, Philip Wilson Publishers, 2013. ISBN 9781781300183
- Newton, Eric. Christopher Wood, 1901–1930. London: Redfern Gallery, 1938.
- Newton, Eric. Christopher Wood: His Life and Work. London: Zwemmer, 1957.
- Upstone, Robert. Christopher Wood: A Catalogue Raisonné. Forthcoming: Lund Humphries.

== See also ==
- List of British artists
- List of St. Ives artists
- Seven and Five Society
