= The Fatal Englishman =

1996 biography by Sebastian Faulks

- First edition cover Cover art, The Lament for Icarus by Herbert Draper, 1898
- Author: Sebastian Faulks
- Subject: Christopher Wood, Richard Hillary, and Jeremy Wolfenden
- Genre: Biography
- Publisher: Hutchinson
- Publication date: 1996
- ISBN: 978-0-09179211-4

The Fatal Englishman: Three Short Lives is a 1996 biography by British writer Sebastian Faulks, first published by Hutchinson. It is a multiple biography of the lives of the artist Christopher Wood, airman Richard Hillary and spy Jeremy Wolfenden.

Reviewing the book for the London Review of Books, Philip French explained that it was a "perceptive study of three men who died young" and quoted Faulks's own observation that "short lives are more sensitive indicators of the pressure of public attitudes than lives lived long and crowned with honours". Writing in the Spectator, David Hare argued that "The book is on a great theme; how the failures of Britain in the 20th century have seeped into the soul of its countrymen".
