= Raïssa Maritain =

French Catholic philosopher and poet (1883–1960)

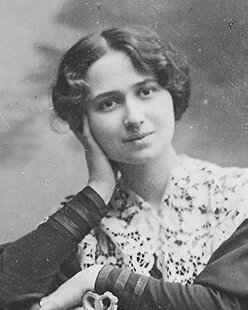
- Maritain in 1905
- Born: Raïssa Oumansoff; September 12, 1883; Rostov-on-Don, Russian Empire
- Died: November 4, 1960 (aged 77); Paris, France
- Burial place: Kolbsheim
- Education: University of Paris
- Occupations: Philosopher; poet; writer
- Spouse: Jacques Maritain (m. 1904)

Raïssa Maritain (French: [maʁitɛ̃]; née Oumansoff; (Note: Russian: Раиса Уманцова, Raisa Umantsova) September 11, 1883 – November 4, 1960) was a Russian-born French Catholic philosopher and poet. She was the wife of Jacques Maritain, with whom she worked and whose companion she was for more than half a century, at the center of a circle of French Catholic intellectuals. Her memoir, Les Grandes Amitiés, which won the prix du Renouveau français, chronicles this. Jacques Maritain, Raïssa and her sister Vera (1886-1959) formed what would be called "the three Maritains".

== Early life and education ==
Raïssa Oumansoff was born on September 12, 1883 (Julian date: August 31, 1883) in the Russian Empire, in Rostov-on-Don, to a Jewish family. Her parents were Ilya (Yuda) Oumansoff (Umantzov) (January 25, 1859 in Pavlohrad - February 21, 1912 in Paris) and Hissia (Gisya) Brozgol (December 29, 1859 in Rostov-on-Don - May 21, 1932 in France).

Her parents came from very devout and observant Hasidic Jewish families. Her father ran a sewing workshop, while her mother performed all kinds of household chores. When Raïssa was two years old, her family moved to Mariupol, by the Sea of Azov.

She was deeply shaped by the piety and traditions of her observant family, especially by the example of her maternal grandfather Solomon (Zalman) Brozgol (1830 - March 11, 1896 in Rostov-on-Don).

Later, in Raïssa's poems, essays, and diary she revealed a very pure, mystical approach, the source of which she described thus: "My maternal grandfather was a Ḥasid, and my father's father was a great ascetic sage. This is my inheritance."

Her maternal grandmother was Gnessya (Nesya) Brozgol (née Rosenblum) (1832 - May 19, 1899 in Rostov-on-Don).

Her maternal cousin (daughter of Rosa Brozgol) was the Italian-Jewish soprano Luba Mirella (née Wagenheim). The two maintained their relationship and corresponded with one another.

In Mariupol, her sister Véra was born in 1886. Very early on, Raïssa showed a great desire to learn. At seven she was admitted to high school despite the very limited quotas for Jews. She admired everything related to school and knowledge and did very well in her studies.

In 1893, when she was ten years old, her parents decided to emigrate. They wanted to ensure the future of their two daughters, Raïssa and Vera, which seemed difficult in Russia because of anti-Semitic discrimination. Their father's initial plan was to go as far as New York, but a friend persuaded him to settle in Paris. The family emigrated to France, where Raïssa continued her education in a communal school in the Passage de la Bonne Graine. In two weeks, she learned French well enough to understand the lessons and be ranked second in the class. Two years later, she changed schools and prepared to enter university.

== Jacques Maritain ==
At seventeen, she began her studies at the Sorbonne, where she followed courses in science. There she met the young Jacques Maritain, a graduate in philosophy who was preparing for a degree in science, and they got engaged. However, their encounter with the arid materialism and all-encompassing determinism of their professors, especially Félix Le Dantec, brought them by 1901 to the brink of despair.

So we decided to put our trust in the unknown for a while longer; we would extend credit to existence, look upon it as an experiment to be made, in the hope that at our vehement appeal the meaning of life would be revealed, that new values would stand forth so clearly that they would enlist our total adherence, and deliver us from the nightmare of a sinister and useless world. But if this experiment did not succeed, the solution would be suicide; suicide before the years accumulated their dust, before our young strength was worn out. We wanted to die by free refusal if it was impossible to live according to the truth."

In 1904, she spent her holidays in a village in Loiret with her family and Jacques Maritain. As hygiene standards were not respected at the inn where they were staying, Raïssa developed a sore throat. She was diagnosed as suffering from a retropharyngeal phlegmon, a disease that caused health problems that she would experience until the end of her life and which prevented her from having a regular occupation.

Henri Bergson's courses at the Collège de France, which Maritain and Raïssa began to attend on the advice of their good friend Charles Péguy, helped them to get out of this despair by enabling them to sense the existence of objective truth and "the very possibility of metaphysical work". They got married in 1904. In 1912, Jacques and Raïssa made a private vow to abstain from sexual relations for life.

== Conversion to Catholicism ==
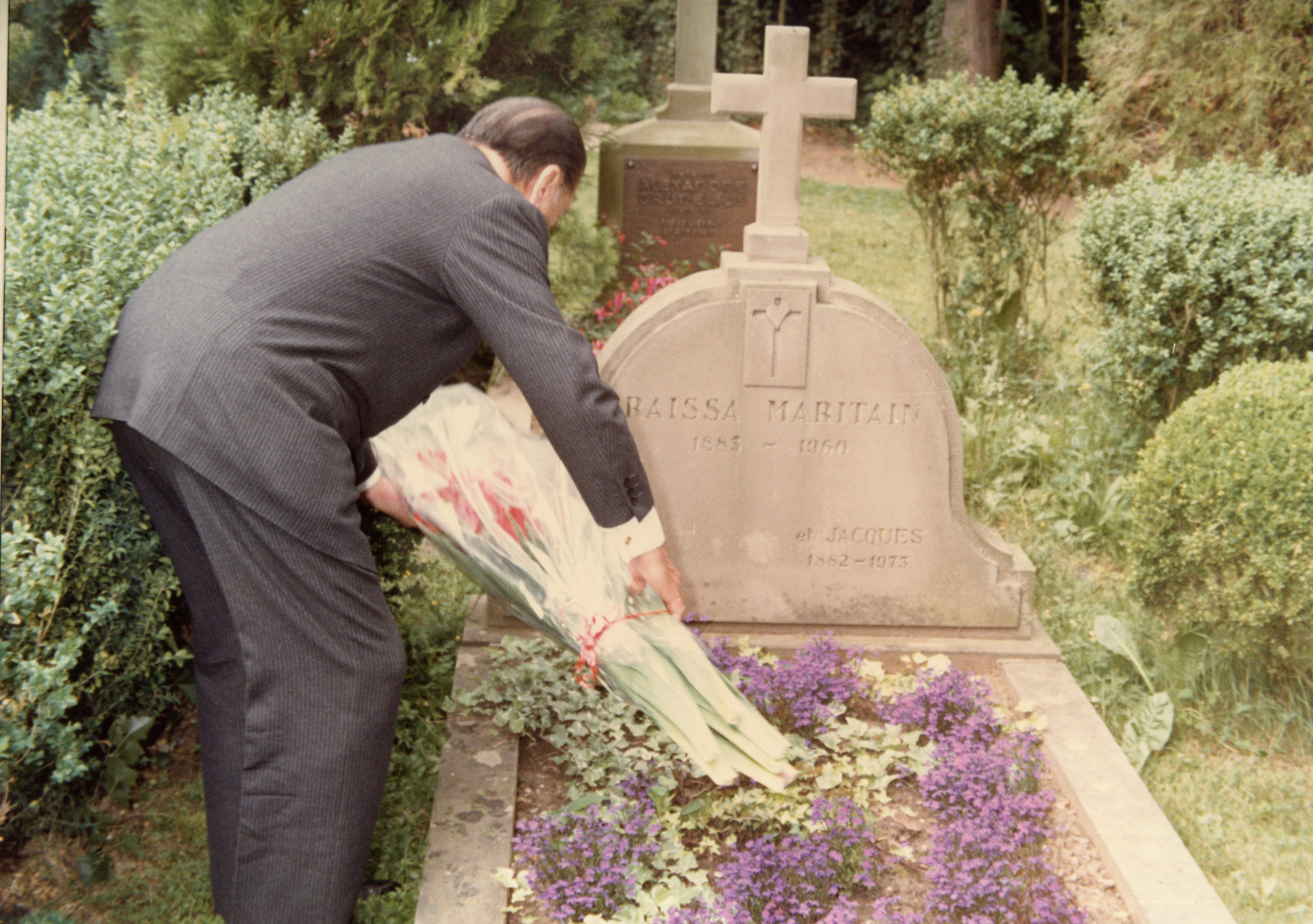
President of Venezuela Rafael Caldera paying tribute at the tombs of Raissa and Jacques, July 1981

Also in 1904, they met Léon Bloy who became their great friend, and they converted to Catholicism. Their baptism, as well as that of Raïssa's sister Véra, took place on June 11, 1906, at the Saint-Jean church in Montmartre, with Bloy as godfather.

After her conversion, Raïssa felt called to have a contemplative life, which was then reserved for nuns. With the help of her husband Jacques and her sister Vera, she managed to find a balance between her prayer life and her place in the world.

Jacques and Raïssa Maritain chose Humbert Clérissac, a Dominican, as their first spiritual director. After his death, another Dominican, Réginald Garrigou-Lagrange, became their spiritual father and their friend.

Raïssa and Jacques Maritain forged a great friendship with Jean Bourgoint, a Cistercian — a former opium addict and lover of Jean Cocteau —, who would go to work in a leper colony in Cameroon – they left an extensive correspondence. Jean Bourgoint was greatly affected by the death of Raïssa on November 4, 1960.

=== Veneration ===
A cause for beatification of her and her husband Jacques was being planned in 2011. Since then, there have been no advancements in the case.

== Publications ==
Essays

- De mœurs divines, Librairie de l’Art catholique, Paris 1921.
- De la vie d’oraison, À l’Art catholique, Paris 1925.
- Le Prince de ce monde, Plon, Paris 1929.
- L’Ange de l’École, ou saint Thomas d’Aquin raconté aux enfants, Alsatia, Paris 1957.
- Marc Chagall, Éditions de la Maison française, New York 1943.
- Léon Bloy, Pilgrim of the Absolute, Pantheon Books, New York-London 1947.
- Les Grandes Amitiés, coll. « Livre de vie », Desclée de Brouwer, 1949.
- Liturgie et contemplation, Desclée de Brouwer, Paris 1959.
- Journal de Raïssa, Desclée de Brouwer, Paris 1962.

Poetry

- La Vie donnée, Labergerie, Paris 1935.
- Lettre de nuit, Desclée de Brouwer, Paris 1939.
- Portes de l’horizon, Monastère Regina Laudis, Bethlehem (Connecticut) 1952.
- Poèmes et essais, Desclée de Brouwer, Paris 1968.
