= High School Musical on Stage! =

Musical

High School Musical On Stage!
- Music: Matthew Gerrard; Robbie Nevil; Ray Cham; Greg Cham; Drew Seeley; Randy Petersen; Kevin Quinn; Andy Dodd; Adam Watts; Bryan Louiselle; David N. Lawrence; Faye Greenberg; Jamie Houston
- Lyrics: Same as music
- Book: David Simpatico
- Basis: High School Musical by Peter Barsocchini
- Productions: 2007 Minneapolis; 2007 US Tour; 2008 UK Tour; 2008 London; 2026 London

High School Musical on Stage! is a musical based on the 2006 Disney Channel Original Movie High School Musical, with music and lyrics by Matthew Gerrard, Robbie Nevil, Ray and Greg Cham, Drew Seeley, Randy Petersen, Kevin Quinn, Andy Dodd, Adam Watts, Bryan Louiselle, David N. Lawrence, Faye Greenberg and Jamie Houston, and a book by David Simpatico. It quickly became a popular choice for high school musical theater productions.

== Main characters ==
List of main characters in their respective groups.

=== Jocks ===
- Troy Bolton – captain of the basketball team, met Gabriella over winter break, lead male.
- Chad Danforth – basketball team member, Troy's best friend.
- Zeke Baylor – basketball team member with a passion for baking, solo in "Status Quo".

=== Thespians ===
- Sharpay Evans – lead in every school musical since kindergarten, president of the drama club, and most popular student, shows interest in Troy and hates Gabriella.
- Ryan Evans – Sharpay's brother, performs with Sharpay in musicals, vice president of the drama club.
- Kelsi Nielsen – pianist for the drama club, composer of the winter musical.

=== Brainiacs ===
- Gabriella Montez – the "new girl" to East High, met Troy over winter break, lead female.
- Taylor McKessie – head of the brainiacs, she convinces Gabriella to join her team for the upcoming Scholastic Decathlon.
- Martha Cox – brainiac, who has a passion for hip-hop, solo in "Status Quo".

=== Skater dudes ===
- Ripper – head of the skater dudes, passion for the cello, solo in "Status Quo".
- Mongo – skater dude, Ripper's "sidekick".

=== Other students ===
- Jack Scott – news announcer at East High. Also known as "The Velvet Fog of East High". Has a crush on Kelsi.

=== Adults ===
- Ms. Darbus – drama teacher. Dislikes the jocks and Coach Bolton.
- Coach Bolton – gym teacher, Troy's father and coach of the basketball team.
- Ms. Tenny – chemistry teacher, may or may not be portrayed as pregnant.

== Productions ==
=== United States tour ===
Disney Theatrical staged a US tour that began on May 29, 2007, and ended on August 3, 2008.

=== United Kingdom ===
An UK tour opened on January 24, 2008 at the Churchill Theatre in Bromley. Due to huge public demand, a second production ran simultaneously at the Hammersmith Apollo in London from June 28 to August 31, 2008, with an official opening on July 5.

A non-replica production began performances at The Lowry in Salford on August 22, 2026, twenty years after the original film, and opened officially on August 27. It ran there until September 19 before transferring to the Troubadour Wembley Park Theatre in London from October 12, 2026 to January 3, 2027. Produced by Hope Mill Theatre and Chris Harper Productions in association with the Lowry, it was co-directed by the Hope Mill founders Joseph Houston and William Whelton, with choreography by Aaron Renfree. Jason Donovan played Coach Bolton at the Lowry, with Harry Judd taking the role for the London dates, while KayCee Stroh, who played Martha Cox in the High School Musical films, appeared as Ms. Darbus at both venues.

=== Regional premieres ===
- On August 1, 2006, Playbill announced that the Stagedoor Manor summer theater camp, featured in the movie Camp, would be the first venue to produce High School Musical on-Broadway. The production, considered a workshop, was performed on August 18.
- From January 13, to January 21, 2007, the musical was performed at the Fox Theatre in Atlanta.
- From June 13 to July 11, 2020, the musical was performed in Lohne by the local high school as one of the first German performances. There were 13 performances in front of expectedly 6,500 spectators.

== Synopsis ==
=== Act I ===
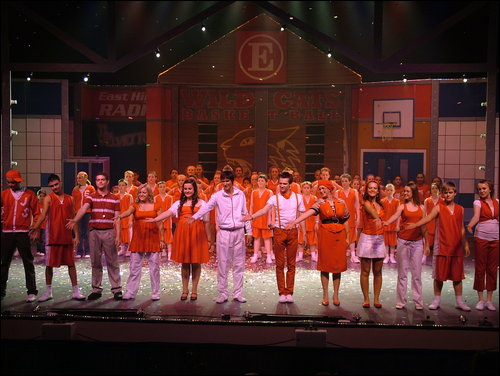
Rhyl Pavilion Theatre production.

At East High School (in Albuquerque, New Mexico) ("Wildcat Cheer"), Troy Bolton tells his Jock friends, Chad Danforth and Zeke Baylor, about meeting Gabriella Montez on New Year's Eve during winter vacation on a ski trip. Gabriella, who has just moved to Albuquerque, also tells her newfound Brainiac friends Taylor McKessie, Kelsi Nielsen and Martha Cox of her vacation. We meet Sharpay and Ryan Evans, the two drama stars of the school. Sharpay is selfish, and Ryan follows her orders but tries to be friends with everyone. Troy and Gabriella have a flashback to New Year's Eve when they met. ("Start of Something New"). One-half of the song is during the flashback, then we return to East High where Chad, Taylor, Kelsi, Ryan, Sharpay, Zeke and other students sing of their New Year's Resolutions.

In homeroom, Mrs. Darbus tells her class of the upcoming winter musical, "Juliet and Romeo", a new version of Shakespeare's "Romeo and Juliet", written by Kelsi Nielsen, a shy East High student. When Ryan, Sharpay, Troy, and Gabriella start using their cell phones, Mrs. Darbus gives them all detention. Chad interferes, telling Mrs. Darbus that Troy cannot go because they have basketball practice after school and that they have an upcoming championship game. Mrs. Darbus then gives Chad a 30-minute detention, and gives Taylor a 35-minute detention when she remarks that Chad can not even count that high. At Gabriella's locker, Troy runs into her and they show their amazement of how they found each other again. Sharpay walks by and tries to flirt with Troy, but he shows no interest in her. Sharpay observes that he is interested in Gabriella and she is interested in him. Later, the Jocks have basketball practice ("Get'cha Head in the Game").

In a Science class, Gabriella shows her smarts by pointing out a flaw in the teacher's equation. Taylor is impressed and asks, on behalf of her Science Club, if Gabriella could join their team to win the upcoming Scholastic Decathlon, although Gabriella refuses. Sharpay overhears and has Ryan investigate by Googling her.

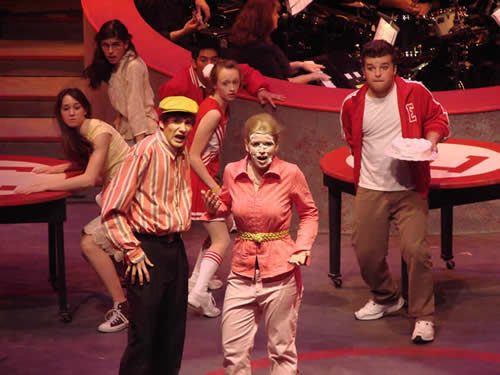
Pacific Repertory Theatre's School of Dramatic Arts production Act 1 Finale.

Discovering that Gabriella was a very intelligent Brainiac at her old school, Sharpay prints her newfound information and puts it in Taylor's locker. The students later head to Mrs. Darbus's room for detention, and act like animals. Taylor then asks Gabriella again to join the Scholastic Decathlon team based on the printouts Sharpay planted in her locker, and Gabriella agrees. Everyone does the "ball of noise", and Coach Bolton comes to get Troy and Chad for practice and then talks to Mrs. Darbus about it.

The next day, thespians audition for the play ("Auditions"). Sharpay and Ryan audition as well ("What I've Been Looking For"). After the auditions have been declared closed, Gabriella and Troy sing the song as Kelsi intended it - much slower ("What I've Been Looking For (Reprise)"). Although Troy and Gabriella did not intend it to be an audition they are called back for a second audition. When their friends hear the news they spread it via cell phones ("Cellular Fusion").

Sharpay is furious, believing Troy and Gabriella have stolen the lead roles and broken the "rules" of East High. Though most of the school agrees, lyrical chaos erupts during a lunch break when students begin telling their secret obsessions outside of their cliques ("Stick to the Status Quo"). The scene culminates with Sharpay getting "caked" by Zeke (who secretly likes her), after Gabriella spins into him. Act I ends with Sharpay angrily shouting "Someone is going to pay for this!"

=== Act II ===
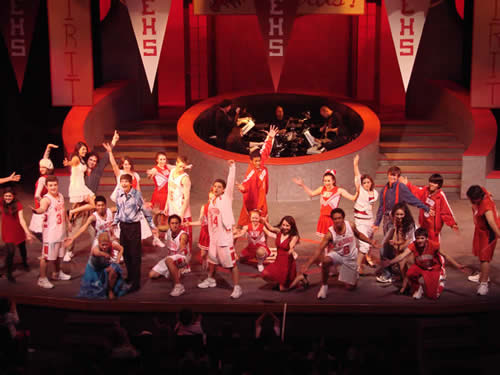
Pacific Repertory Theatre's production.

Jack Scott recaps events before Troy and Gabriella dance on the rooftop garden ("I Can't Take My Eyes Off of You"). Zeke comes to Sharpay's locker and tries to flirt with her. Meanwhile, the Jocks and Brainiacs plot against the infuriated duo during study hall. Sharpay and Ryan see the Jocks and the Brainiacs mingling together and imagine they are trying to help Troy and Gabriella. So Sharpay lies to Mrs. Darbus saying that Troy and his dad are trying to ruin the auditions because she gave Troy detention. Later at practice, ("Wildcat Cheer (Reprise)"), Mrs. Darbus talks to Troy's dad and then he talks to Troy. Gabriella comes to practice to see Troy while Martha comes and takes her to the lab. Troy's dad thinks Gabriella is the reason why Troy got detention. He tells Troy that he is a playmaker and not a singer. This infuriates Troy who angrily asks his father if he ever wondered if he could be both and storms off in a rage, leaving his father stunned.

The Jocks and Brainiacs put their plan to work, pushing at Troy and Gabriella to "split up". Eventually, Troy, furious with his friends for telling him the same things his dad did, gives in and pretends that he doesn't like Gabriella, completely oblivious to the phone in Zeke's hand, transmitting Troy's words directly to Gabriella ("Counting on You"). Gabriella hears and becomes very upset. Troy and Gabriella, lonely and upset, sing ("When There Was Me and You"). The Jocks and Brainiacs then realize that they have gone too far and feel guilty for ruining Troy and Gabriella's relationship.

The next day, Sharpay and Ryan are rehearsing for their callback while Sharpay talks to Ryan about her role in the school. Then Troy comes in looking for Gabriella and Ryan tells him that she is in the theatre. Troy goes to the theatre and tells Gabriella that they were set up and he didn't mean what he said and sings to remind her of New Year's ("Start of Something New (Reprise)").

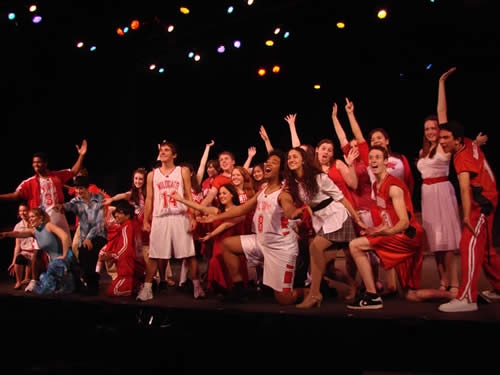
Pacific Repertory Theatre's School of Dramatic Arts production Act 2 Finale.

Hearing that the callback date has been moved up by request of Sharpay to the same time as the big game and the Scholastic Decathlon, Troy and Gabriella announce to the Jocks and Brainiacs that they are not going to do the callback, but instead help their respective teams for their events. The Jocks and Brainiacs say they should do the callbacks. Troy and Gabriella refuse, but the teams decide to lend a helping hand anyway ("We're All In This Together").

On the day of the big game, Decathlon and callbacks, the students are excited for the festivities. Sharpay and Ryan perform their callback song ("Bop to the Top"), which at the same time happens with the basketball championship and the science decathlon, during which Taylor engineers an electronic meltdown in the decathlon and light malfunctions in the game, which forces all the students to move to the theater. Chad and Taylor explain to Troy and Gabriella that this is their only chance. Mrs. Darbus, hesitant to allow Troy and Gabriella an audition due to their lateness, has no choice but to let them audition as the auditorium fills with students ("Breaking Free"). Mrs. Darbus gives Troy and Gabriella the parts on the spot with everyone watching.

The end of Act II brings us to the gym where all the main characters wrap up their plots (Chad asks Taylor to an after-party, Zeke gets Sharpay to be nice to him, Jack Scott and Kelsi flirt, and Sharpay makes up with Gabriella and Troy). The Wildcats win the big game and the Decathlon. The students celebrate ("We're All in This Together (Reprise)") followed by a recap of all the major songs in the show ("Megamix") during the curtain call.

== Musical numbers ==
Titles of songs which appeared in the original 2006 film are in bold.

Act I

- "Wildcat Cheer" - Company
- "**Start of Something New**" - Troy, Gabriella, and Company
- "**Get'cha Head in the Game**" - Troy and Company
- "Get'cha Head in the Game" (reprise) - Troy and Company
- "Auditions" - Ms. Darbus and Company
- "**What I've Been Looking For**" - Ryan and Sharpay
- "**What I've Been Looking For**" **(reprise)** - Troy, Gabriella
- "Cellular Fusion" - Taylor, Chad, Martha, Zeke, Kelsi, Sharpay, Ryan, and Company
- "**Stick to the Status Quo**" - Zeke, Troy, Martha, Gabriella, Ripper, Mongo, Sharpay, Ryan, and Company

Act II

- "I Can't Take My Eyes Off of You" - Troy and Gabriella
- "Wildcat Cheer" (reprise) - Company
- "Counting on You" - Chad, Taylor, Zeke, Martha, and Company
- "**When There Was Me and You**" - Gabriella, Troy, and Company
- "Start of Something New" (reprise) - Troy and Gabriella
- "We're All in This Together" - Chad, Taylor, Kelsi, Zeke, Martha, and Company
- "**Bop to the Top**" - Sharpay, Ryan, and Company
- "**Breaking Free**" - Troy, Gabriella, and Company
- "**We're All in This Together**" **(reprise)** - Troy, Gabriella, Ryan, and Sharpay
- "Megamix" - Coach Bolton, Ms. Darbus, and Company

Note: "I Can't Take My Eyes Off of You" was previously recorded for the film but cut during its production, reinstated for the stage version.

== Casts ==
Character	Minneapolis	US tour	UK tour	London	London
Character	2007	2007	2008	2008	2026
Troy Bolton	Benjamin R. Bakken	John Jeffrey Martin	Ashley Day	Mark Evans	Tobias Turley
Gabriella Montez	Katie Allen	Arielle Jacobs	Lorna Want	Claire-Marie Hall	Leonor Correia
Sharpay Evans	Laura Otremba	Chandra Lee Schwartz	Helen George	Rebecca Faulkenberry	Caitlin Tipping
Ryan Evans	Brian Skellenger	Bobby List	Lee Honey-Jones	Michael Pickering	Luke Bayer
Chad Danforth	Nathan Shrake	Shakiem Evans	Carlton Connell	Damian Winter-Higgins	Jordan Benjamin
Taylor McKessie	Ivory Doublette	Shaullanda LaCombe	Hannah Levane	Nadine Higgin	Char Burnett
Ms. Darbus	Beth Gilleland	Ellen Harvey	Claire Machin	Letitia Dean	KayCee Stroh
Coach Bolton	Steve Sweere	Ron Bohmer	Mark Dickinson	Norman Bowman	Harry Judd
Jack Scott	Cody Braudt	Michael Mahany	Richard Vincent	Ben Nicholas	Curtis Patrick
Kelsi Nielson	Isabella Dawis	Olivia Oguma	Jennifer Tanarez	Holly Taylor	Yna Tresvalles
Zeke Baylor	Jameson Pieper	Ben Thompson	Dominic Tribuzio	Dylan Turner	Simeon Beckett
Martha Cox	Risa Dorken	Lizzie Weiss	Cathryn Davis	Laurie Scarth	Olivia O'Connor

== High School Musical 2: On Stage! ==
High School Musical 2, the sequel to the popular movie High School Musical, was also being spun off into a stage musical. Like the original, the show has been adapted into 2 different productions: A 1-act, 70-minute version and a 2-act full length production. This stage production includes the song "Hummuhummunukunukuapua'a" that was left out of the original movie but included in the DVD. Through Music Theatre International, Disney Theatrical is licensing the theatrical rights. MTI had originally recruited 7 schools to serve as tests for the new full-length adaptation, but due to complications with multiple drafts of both the script and the score, all but two schools were forced to drop out of the pilot program.

- On May 18, 2008, Woodlands High School became the first school to produce High School Musical 2.
- From July 17-August 3, 2008, Harrell Theatre, in Collierville, Tennessee, was the first community theatre to perform the production, which featured both a senior cast and a junior cast.
- From 14 to 18 April 2009, the Irish Premiere was performed by Meath Youth Musical Society in Navan.

== See also ==
- High School Musical 3: Senior Year
- High School Musical: el desafío (2008 Argentine film)
- High School Musical: The Musical: The Series
