= Cashback (film) =

2006 British romantic comedy-drama film by Sean Ellis

- The poster from the original short film
- Directed by: Sean Ellis
- Written by: Sean Ellis
- Produced by: Lene Bausager; Sean Ellis
- Starring: Sean Biggerstaff; Emilia Fox
- Cinematography: Angus Hudson
- Edited by: Carlos Domeque; Scott Thomas
- Music by: Guy Farley
- Production companies: Left Turn Films; Lipsync Productions; Ugly Duckling Productions
- Distributed by: The Works; Universal Pictures (UK) Ltd
- Release dates: 10 September 2006 (TIFF); 9 May 2008
- Running time: 102 minutes
- Country: United Kingdom
- Language: English
- Box office: $2.3 million

Cashback is a 2006 British romantic comedy-drama film written and directed by Sean Ellis. Originally exhibited as a short in 2004, it was expanded to feature length in 2006. Both versions were produced by Lene Bausager, starring Sean Biggerstaff and Emilia Fox.

== Plot ==
After a painful breakup with his girlfriend Suzy, art student Ben Willis develops insomnia. To take his mind off Suzy and to occupy the extra waking hours he has recently gained, Ben begins working at a local Sainsbury's supermarket, where he meets colourful co-workers. Among them is his colleague Sharon, with whom he soon develops a mutual crush. As his personal means to escape the boredom inherent in the night shift, Ben lets his imagination run wild. In particular, he imagines that he can stop time so that he can walk around in a world that is "frozen" like the pause of a film. He imagines female patrons of the supermarket stopped in time, allowing him to undress and draw them.

A series of flashbacks occur with each progression of the plot, accompanied by Ben's narration and an examination of the effect the situation had had upon him. He explains how he always has been impressed by the beauty of the female body: how he, as a young boy, witnessed a Swedish boarder walk naked from the shower to her room. In another flashback, the young Ben and his best friend Sean share Sean's discovery of his parents' adult magazines, and Sean pays a neighborhood girl called Natalie fifty pence to show him her vulva. Other neighborhood boys repeat this trade.

Ben's boss, Alan Jenkins, recruits the staff for a weekend football game and, after an embarrassing defeat, 26–0, Ben's mind wandered elsewhere, imagining he is not alone in moving around a time-stopped world. When Jenkins throws a party to honor his own birthday and as a consolation for their defeat, Sharon asks Ben to be her date, to which he eagerly but nervously agrees. Ben, on Jenkins' behalf and with Sean's help, hired a stripper for the party. During the party, Sean realized the stripper is Natalie while Ben encounters his ex-girlfriend Suzy, who implores him to try their relationship again. Ben refuses her advance, but she kisses him. Sharon who had just rebuffed Jenkins' drunken advances, witnesses the kiss from afar and angrily leaves the party. Ben realizes Sharon has seen the kiss. He seeks to explain himself to Sharon at her apartment, and a confrontation similar to the film-opening breakup occurs. Sharon henceforth does not show up to work at the supermarket. He spent days re-imagining that fateful event frozen in time, eventually concluding that he can't correct the mistake.

As a practical joke, colleagues Barry and Matt phone Ben; Matt poses as an art gallery owner who is interested in displaying Ben's drawings and schedules an appointment for Ben to present more to him. When Ben arrives as agreed, the reaction of the owner quickly reveals that he has been pranked. However, the gallery owner is nonetheless interested in Ben's work and decides to exhibit Ben's drawings. Sharon receives an invitation to the exhibition and visits. She is moved as most of the pieces depict her and she happily greets Ben, congratulating him on his success. This leads to the finale where the two reconcile, kiss, and step outside into a time-frozen snowfall.

== Cast ==
- Sean Biggerstaff as Ben Willis
- Emilia Fox as Sharon Pintey
- Shaun Evans as Sean Higgins
- Michelle Ryan as Suzy
- Stuart Goodwin as Alan Jenkins
- Michael Dixon as Barry Brickman
- Michael Lambourne as Matt Stephens
- Janine-May Tinsley as Adult Natalie (as Janine May Tinsley)
- Nelly Lyster-Smith as Young Natalie
- Gayle Dudley as Natalie's mother
- Marc Pickering as Brian
- Keeley Hazell as Frozen Girl in Sainsbury's
- Jay Bowen as Steve Jenkins
- Hayley-Marie Coppin as Swedish boarder
- Jared Harris (uncredited) as Alex Proud

== Production ==
Originally exhibited as a short film in 2004, it was expanded to feature length in 2006. The feature film includes nearly all of the content of the short. Following a decision in December 2005 to proceed with the feature, Ellis completed the expanded script in seven days. After getting commitments from his cast in March he secured financing and the film went into production in May. This schedule was exceedingly condensed by modern film making standards. As all of the key players were available to appear in the feature, it was possible to incorporate the original short virtually without change.

The feature film uses an original score composed by Guy Farley including one piece, "Frozen" which featured on the Classic FM album, The Quiet Room in July 2006.

== Release ==
The feature had its North American premiere on September 10, 2006, at the Toronto International Film Festival. It was later screened at a number of other international festivals. The film got a limited theatrical release in the US on 17 July 2007 and in the UK May 2008. The DVD for the European region was released in September 2007. The UK DVD was released in September 2008.

== Critical response ==
On Rotten Tomatoes, Cashback holds a score of 47% based on 53 reviews, with an average rating of 5.50/10. The consensus reads, "An unlikable protagonist, messy editing, and gratuitous nudity might make audiences ask for their cash back." Metacritic, which uses a weighted average, assigned the film a score of 54 out of 100, based on 17 critics, indicating "mixed or average" reviews.

In contrast, Justin Chang of Variety described it as "slickly charming, gently erotic and directed with supreme polish". Roger Ebert of the Chicago Sun-Times said the film is "lightweight, as it should be", adding that Ben and Sharon "are delighted to be admired by such wonderful partners, and we are happy for them. And that's about it." Matt Seitz of The New York Times called the film a "crock", criticizing its "validation of Ben's adolescent concept of beauty, its wafer-thin characterizations, its gorgeous but overwrought widescreen photography and its abundance of 'How did they do that?' trick shots." Steven Rea of The Philadelphia Inquirer gave the film three of four stars, calling it "a sleek little meditation on beauty, desire, love and time", but saying it "isn't as deep as it pretends to be." Scott Tobias of The A.V. Club graded the film as a "C−", noting its "luscious imagery" but ultimately calling it trite and unremarkable. Jeff Shannon of The Seattle Times gave the film a positive review, commending its account of love and its visual style. Ed Gonzalez of Slant Magazine gave a particularly negative review, criticizing it for misogyny and sexual objectification, adding that Ben is "just as skuzzily self-absorbed as his perpetually horny mates." Jim Ridley of The Village Voice said "[t]he movie is too cute by half, made close to unbearable whenever Ben's narration spews glib pseudo-profundities about memory and temporal stillness", while also complimenting some of its comic and visual elements. Desson Thomson of The Washington Post was also critical, describing Ben and Sharon's romance as uninventive and the film as shallow.

== Accolades ==
The short film won 14 awards at international film festivals and was nominated for the 2006 Academy Award for Best Live Action Short Film. After the nomination, it was a popular download from iTunes (US).

Short

- Brest European Short Film Festival (Grand Prix)
- Chicago International Film Festival (Gold Hugo)
- Leuven International Short Film Festival (Audience Award)
- Lille International Short Film Festival (First Prize)
- Tribeca Film Festival (Best Narrative Short)
- FIKE 2005 - Évora International Short Film Festival (Audience Award)

Feature

- Bermuda International Film Festival (Won Jury Prize)
- San Sebastian International Film Festival (Won C.I.C.A.E Award)
