= Woolfenden =

Woolfenden is a surname. Notable people with the surname include:

- Glen Everett Woolfenden (1930–2007), American ornithologist
- Guy Woolfenden (1937–2016), English composer and conductor
- Luke Woolfenden (born 1998), English footballer
- Stephen Woolfenden (born 1966), British television director

== See also ==
- Wolfenden (disambiguation)
