= Sean Biggerstaff =

Scottish actor (born 1983)

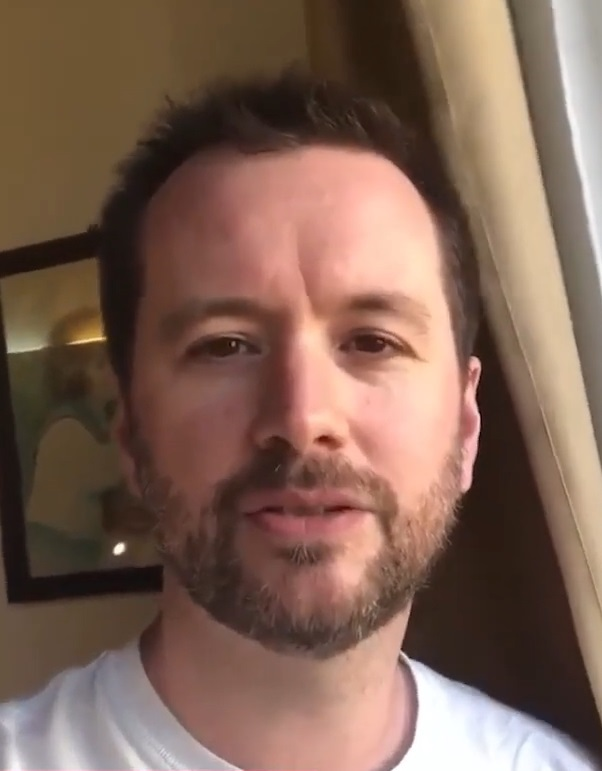
- Biggerstaff in 2023
- Born: 15 March 1983 (age 43); Glasgow, Scotland
- Occupation: Actor
- Years active: 1993–present
- Known for: Oliver Wood in Harry Potter

Sean Biggerstaff (born 15 March 1983) is a Scottish actor. He is best known for playing Oliver Wood in the Harry Potter film series, appearing in Harry Potter and the Philosopher's Stone (2001), Harry Potter and the Chamber of Secrets (2002), and Harry Potter and the Deathly Hallows – Part 2 (2011).

Biggerstaff began acting as a child actor at the age of five and made his screen debut in the television miniseries The Crow Road (1996). He won a BAFTA Scotland Award for playing Jeremy Wolfenden in the television film Consenting Adults (2007). He also appeared in the feature films Cashback (2006) and Mary Queen of Scots (2013).

== Early life ==
Biggerstaff was born on 15 March 1983 in Glasgow, Scotland, growing up with his parents in Maryhill. He went to Parkview Primary School in Summerston and joined the local drama group, the Maryhill Youth Theatre, when he was seven.

== Career ==
Biggerstaff gained his first professional acting role at ten, playing the son of MacDuff in a Michael Boyd production of Macbeth at the Tron Theatre, Glasgow. He then joined the Scottish Youth Theatre and spent six years with the group. In 1996, at the age of 13, Biggerstaff secured his first major TV role, playing Young Darren in the BBC production of The Crow Road. At 14, he was cast by future fellow Harry Potter actor Alan Rickman in his new movie, The Winter Guest, as Tom, a mischievous schoolboy. In a 2002 interview, Biggerstaff recalled: "It was while at the Scottish Youth Theatre that I was chosen for The Winter Guest. Alan Rickman (known to most of the kids as "the bad guy from Die Hard") popped along one day looking for two boys to accompany him to the coldest place on Earth, Fife, for two months to make a film. Myself and the suspicious character that is Douglas Murphy were the lucky ones."

Rickman later recommended Biggerstaff to the London acting agency International Creative Management and Paul Lyon-Maris. Within a week, the Harry Potter castings were being distributed. During auditions, the directors suggested that Biggerstaff consider the part of Oliver Wood, and he played the role in the first two films, returning for a brief appearance in Harry Potter and the Deathly Hallows – Part 2.

Biggerstaff's career since the first two Harry Potter films has included playing Henry, Duke of Gloucester in the 2004 television mini-series Charles II: The Power and The Passion; Matt in the world premiere of Sharman MacDonald's stage play The Girl With Red Hair; and Ben Willis in the short film Cashback for which extra scenes were recorded, and the piece was adapted into a feature released in 2006.

In 2007, Biggerstaff played Jeremy Wolfenden in the BBC 4 television film Consenting Adults which was nominated for BAFTA Scotland's Best Drama Award on 18 November 2007, and won him the BAFTA Scotland's Award for Best Actor – Television. He appeared in the film Hippie Hippie Shake. and appeared in Whisky Galore! (2016) directed by Gillies MacKinnon and co-starring Eddie Izzard.

In 2016, Biggerstaff played the lead role in French-Canadian Catherine-Anne Toupin's Right Now, a translation by Chris Campbell of À présent, directed by Michael Boyd, which was critically and commercially well received in Bath, London, and Edinburgh.

In 2017, it was announced that he would star opposite Georgia Tennant in the Big Finish audio series Jenny: The Doctor's Daughter, taking the role of Noah.

== List of credits ==
=== Film ===
Year	Title	Role	Notes	Ref.
1997	The Winter Guest	Tom		
2001	Harry Potter and the Philosopher's Stone	Oliver Wood		
2002	Harry Potter and the Chamber of Secrets	Oliver Wood		
2004	Cashback	Ben Willis	Short (18 minutes)	
2006	Cashback	Ben Willis	Feature based on the 2004 short	
2009	X on a Map	Paul	Short (13 minutes)	
2009	Voices	Herb Wallace	Short (20 minutes)	
2010	Hippie Hippie Shake			
2011	Harry Potter and the Deathly Hallows – Part 2	Oliver Wood	Cameo, Uncredited	
2013	Mary Queen of Scots	Earl of Bothwell		
2016	Whisky Galore!	Sergeant Odd		
2018	Super November	Mikey		
2020	Sockdown	Sean	Short film	

=== Television ===
Year	Title	Role	Network	Notes	Ref.
1996	The Crow Road	Young Darren	BBC Scotland	Mini-series	
1998	Bright Sparks		CBBC		
2003	Doctor Who: Shada	Chris Parsons		Voice for webcast animation	
2003	Charles II: The Power and The Passion	Henry, Duke of Gloucester	BBC One	Mini-series	
2007	Consenting Adults	Jeremy Wolfenden	BBC Four	Drama	
2009	Agatha Christie's Marple	Bobby Attfield	ITV	Series 4 Episode 4 "Why Didn't They Ask Evans?"	
2009	Garrow's Law	Tom	BBC One	Series 1 Episode 3	
2019–2020	Urban Myths	Billy	2 episodes		
2023	Good Omens	Mr. Dalrymple		Series 2	

=== Radio ===
Year	Title	Role	Notes	Ref.
2003	Shada	Chris Parsons	Big Finish Doctor Who audio drama	
2008	The Skull of Sobek	Snabb	Big Finish Doctor Who audio drama	
2008	Time Reef	The Ruhk	Big Finish Doctor Who audio drama	
2009	In a Land Far Away	Jamie 'Bullet' McQueen	BBC Radio 4 Afternoon Drama	
2011	Good With People	Jack	BBC Radio 4 Afternoon Play	
2012	Rebus: The Black Book	DS Brian Holmes	BBC Radio 4 Classic Serial	
2013	Bernice Summerfield: New Frontiers	Antonio Tulloch	Big Finish Doctor Who audio	
2014	Heart and Soul	Ivor	Big Finish Doctor Who audio	
2018	Jenny: The Doctor’s Daughter	Noah	Big Finish Doctor Who audio	
2021	Jenny: The Doctor’s Daughter - Still Running	Noah	Big Finish Doctor Who audio	
2024	Jenny: The Doctor’s Daughter - Saving Time	Noah	Big Finish Doctor Who audio	

=== Theatre ===
Year	Title	Role	Theatre	Ref.
1993	Macbeth	Macduff's son	Tron Theatre, Glasgow	
2005	The Girl With Red Hair	Matt	Royal Lyceum Theatre, Edinburgh; Hampstead Theatre, London	
2012	Appointment with the Wicker Man	Rory	National Theatre of Scotland, Tour	
2016	Right Now (A Présent)	Ben	Ustinov Studio, Bath	
2017	Brothers Karamazov	Ivan	Tron Theatre, Glasgow	

== Awards ==
Year	Group	Award	Result	Film	Ref.
2007	BAFTA Scotland	Best Actor – Television	Won	Consenting Adults	
