= Marc Pickering =

British actor

- Born: Hull, East Riding of Yorkshire, England
- Occupation: Actor
- Years active: 1990–present

Marc Pickering is an English stage, film and television actor who appeared in Sleepy Hollow, Calendar Girls, and HBO's Boardwalk Empire.

== Early life and education ==
Pickering was born in Hull, East Riding of Yorkshire. He was first attracted to acting at age eight when he saw an audition sign for The Sound of Music and said to his father "I wouldn't mind doing that." Although he did not get the part, he was keen to get involved, and joined the National Youth Music Theatre. When he was 12, one of the theatre's directors, Jeremy James Taylor, put Pickering forward for the part of Young Masbath in Sleepy Hollow, directed by Tim Burton. Pickering also attended South Hunsley Secondary School.

== Career ==
Pickering performed in Bugsy Malone; as the Artful Dodger in Oliver Twist; and in The Long and the Short and the Tall on various London stages before starring opposite Helen Mirren and Julie Walters in Calendar Girls in 2003. He then returned to the stage as Joseph Merrick in The Elephant Man. The production did not use prosthetics, to encourage the audience to see Merrick's struggle and emotions.

Pickering's most significant television role to date was in Peter Kay's 2008 talent show parody Britain's Got the Pop Factor..., in which he played R Wayne, a role that involved singing and dancing.

In 2012, Pickering played Montparnasse in Tom Hooper's 2012 reimagining of the celebrated musical Les Misérables. In 2014, he portrayed Enoch "Nucky" Thompson in his younger years, in the fifth and final season of the HBO television series Boardwalk Empire.

From December 2015 to January 2016, Pickering played Abanazar in Aladdin at the Milton Keynes Theatre. In April and May 2016, he was in the European debut of the rock musical The Toxic Avenger at the Southwark Playhouse, London.

He also had a part as a pizza delivery man in an episode of the third series of the BBC comedy Josh which aired on 6 November 2017. In 2021, he appeared in an episode of the BBC soap opera Doctors as Dixie Calthorpe.

In 2023, Pickering played all four Hardthrasher siblings and several other roles in Bleak Expectation at London's Criterion Theatre. In 2026, he was cast as Adonis in Mischief Theatre's Thespians: Greece The Musical (But Not That One).

== Filmography ==
=== Film ===
Year	Title	Role	Notes
1999	Sleepy Hollow	Young Masbath	
2003	Calendar Girls	Gaz	
2004	Secret Passage	Andrea Zane	
2004	The Queen of Sheba's Pearls	Dinger Bell	
2006	Cashback	Brian 'Kung-Fu'	
2007	I Want Candy	Sam	
2011	The Task	Randall	
2011	Kill Keith	Danny	
2012	Will Power	PC Sudbury	
2012	Les Misérables	Montparnasse	
2012	The Warning	Craig	
2013	The Best Years	Emmet Nelis	
2013	A Viking Saga: The Darkest Day	Hereward	
2018	The Krays: Dead Man Walking	Reggie Kray	
2020	To Be Someone	Vinny	

=== Television ===
Year	Title	Role	Notes
2006	Dalziel and Pascoe	Sammy Hogarth	Episode: "Fallen Angel"
2008	Britain's Got the Pop Factor	R Wayne	Television film
2012	The Cricklewood Greats	Tommy	Television film
2013	Homeboys	Brian	Television film
2014	Boardwalk Empire	Nucky Thompson	4 episodes
2014	Borgia	Ippolito d'Este	6 episodes
2017	Josh	Pizza Guy	Episode: "Stood Up and Sat Down"
2020	The Inside Man 2	Yoga Attendee	Miniseries
2021	Doctors	Dixie Calthorpe	Episode: "Impressions"
