= Zonacalda =

Studio album by Pierluigi Castellano
- Released: 2002
- Genre: Opera
- Length: 62:29
- Label: Ants
- Producer: Giovanni Antognozzi

Pierluigi Castellano chronology
Computer Dreams (1999)	Zonacalda (2002)

Professional ratings
Review scores
Source	Rating
Allmusic	3/5 stars

Zonacalda is the sixth album of the Italian composer Pierluigi Castellano.

The texts, chosen and adapted by Francesco Antinucci, are of John Keats, Johann Wolfgang von Goethe and Lucretius.

== Track listing ==
1. Recitativo I – 3:42
2. Ah Happy – 8:16
3. Recitativo II – 6:02
4. Have Nun Ach – 8:40
5. Recitativo III – 6:05
6. Sic Alid – 12:19
7. Appendix I – 7:00
8. Appendix II – 3:22
9. Appendix III – 7:03

== Personnel ==
- Pierluigi Castellano – synthesizer, sampler, conducting
- Roberto Abbondanza – vocals
- Alvin Curran – piano, shofar
- Paolo Fresu – trumpet
- Diego Conti – violin
- Luca Venitucci – electronic keyboard
- Fabrizio Spera – percussion
