= James Spence =

James Spence may refer to:

- James Spence (sailor) (1875–1946), Olympic sailor from the Great Britain
- James Spence (surgeon) (1812–1882), Scottish surgeon
- James Calvert Spence (1892–1954), British paediatrician
- James Houston Spence (1867–1939), Canadian lawyer and Senator
- James MacDonald Spence, lawyer and Justice of the Ontario Superior Court of Justice
- Jamie Spence (born 1963), English golfer
- James Spence, Scottish author of the 2009 book Silly Beggar

== See also ==
- Jim Spence (disambiguation)
