= Wolfenden =

Wolfenden may refer to any of the following:

== People ==
- Wolfenden (surname)

== Places ==
- Wolfenden, location and township near Newchurch-in-Rossendale, Lancashire
- Mount Wolfenden, Vancouver
