= Les Enfants terribles =

1929 novel by Jean Cocteau

The Holy Terrors (Les Enfants Terribles)
- US edition
- Author: Jean Cocteau
- Original title: Les Enfants Terribles
- Translator: Rosamond Lehmann
- Illustrator: Jean Cocteau
- Cover artist: Jean Cocteau
- Language: French
- Publisher: New Directions
- Publication date: 1929
- Publication place: France
- English publication date: 1930
- Pages: 183
- ISBN: 0-8112-0021-3
- OCLC: 86041984

Les Enfants Terribles is a 1929 novel by Jean Cocteau, published by Editions Bernard Grasset. It concerns two siblings, Elisabeth and Paul, who isolate themselves from the world as they grow up, an isolation which is shattered by the stresses of their adolescence. It was first translated into English by Samuel Putnam in 1930 and published by Brewer & Warren. A later English translation by Rosamond Lehmann was published in the U.S. by New Directions (ISBN 0811200213) in 1955, and in Canada by Mclelland & Stewart in 1966, with the title translated as The Holy Terrors. The book is illustrated by the author's own drawings.

The novel was made into a film of the same name, a collaboration between Cocteau and director Jean-Pierre Melville, in 1950, and inspired the opera of the same name by Philip Glass. Miloš Petrović composed a chamber opera based on the novel. The ballet La Boule de neige by the choreographer Fabrizio Monteverde, with music by Pierluigi Castellano, is also based on this novel. The story was adapted by the writer Gilbert Adair for his 1988 novel The Holy Innocents, which was the basis for Bernardo Bertolucci's 2003 film The Dreamers.

== Plot ==
The story concerns the siblings Paul and Elisabeth, who start the story without a father and with a bed-ridden mother, whom Elisabeth looks after. At school, Paul is obsessed with the attractive Dargelos, while Paul’s school friend Gerard is enthralled by the siblings. However, after Paul becomes ill when Dargelos throws a snowball with a stone inside at him, Elisabeth cares for both him and their mother. While Elisabeth nurses Paul, it is revealed that the siblings enjoy a relationship characterised by a psychodrama known in the book as "The Game", which can only be played in their shared bedroom, elevated by the Game-play into "The Room". The game devised by Paul and Elisabeth often involves the siblings trying to annoy or irritate each other, Elisabeth through histrionic behaviour and Paul through a taciturn refusal to be affected by her, where the winner is the one who leaves the contest with the last word, a sense of superiority, and, ideally, having caused a display of angry frustration from the other. This game continues after Paul recovers and their mother has died.

Elisabeth soon takes up a job as a model, where she meets Agathe, a girl who was orphaned at a young age after her drug-addicted parents committed suicide. Agathe, characterised by her strong resemblance to Dargelos, soon moves in with Paul and Elisabeth.

Elisabeth is the first member of the group to get married. She weds a wealthy young man who dies on his way to a business meeting before the married couple can enjoy their honeymoon. As a result of his death, the siblings inherit a large house, into which they move. Paul soon finds himself in love with Agathe. He writes a letter declaring his love to her and stakes his life on her reciprocation. Elisabeth, who cannot stand to see her brother happy and knows she must draw him back into their shared private world, intercepts the letter to prevent it from reaching Agathe and tells Agathe that Gerard is in love with her. Then, Elisabeth manages to bully Gerard, who is in love with her, into marrying Agathe and, as a result, helps break her brother’s heart. She feels herself condemned and pursued by the Furies thereafter, for the crime of having destroyed Paul and Agathe's happiness through deceit.

After Agathe and Gerard's marriage, Gerard meets with Dargelos, who now collects poisons. Dargelos sends one of these poisons to Paul, whom he knows is also a poison-enthusiast, as a gift. The poison is opium (to which Jean Cocteau, the author of this book, was himself addicted), and Paul takes most of it in despair over Agathe. As he lies dying, he is attended by Agathe, who, reviving Paul temporarily, confesses her love to him, and Elisabeth's plot is laid bare. At this moment, Elisabeth senses that Paul's death is yet another twist in the game and that, by dying, he would beat her to the final move, so she shoots herself and dies a matter of seconds before he does, leaving a frightened Agathe with two dead bodies.
