= Pierluigi Castellano =

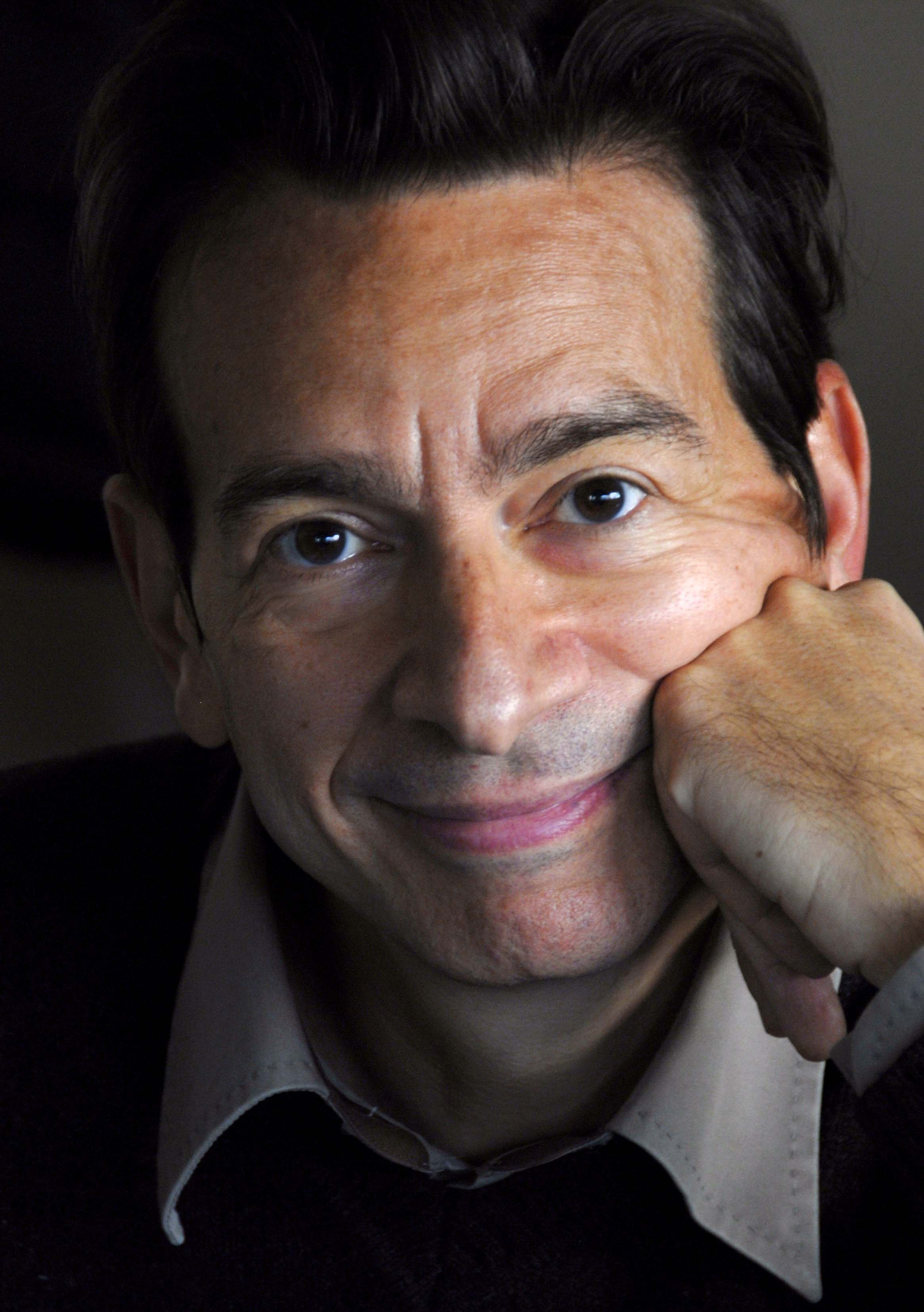

Background information
- Born: 1958 (age 67–68); Rome, Italy
- Genres: Jazz, Experimental rock, Contemporary classical music, ambient
- Occupation: composer
- Years active: 1982–present
- Website: Pierluigi Castellano on Facebook

Pierluigi Castellano (born 1958, in Rome) is an Italian musician, composer and journalist.

== Biography ==
Castellano began his career by studying piano, clarinet, composition and electronic music, attending seminars held by Karlheinz Stockhausen and Aldo Clementi.

In 1983 and 1984 took part in the work of Giovanna Marini, Le Cadeau de l'Empereur held, among others, at the Festival d'Avignon, the Théâtre des Bouffes du Nord in Paris and the Teatre Grec in Barcelona.

Between 1985 and 1990 he composed several soundtracks for theater, movies (A futura memoria: Pier Paolo Pasolini, by Ivo Barnabò Micheli), but particularly for dance shows (choreography by Enzo Cosimi, Fabrizio Monteverde and others) with good critical and commercial feedbacks in France, England and the United States. He also composed Electronic Music for the ENEL and Infobyte project for the Seville Expo '92. For Rai Radio Tre Castellano composed two Operas: Viaggio nel Cyberspazio (1993) and Zonacalda (1995). He took part in the European research project HELP working on the musical translation of visual art.

As journalist Castellano wrote for Il Manifesto and works for the Italian national television RAI.

== Discography ==
- La Boule De Neige (General Music)– GM 30719 (1985)
- Danze (Mantra Records) – DM 86002 (1987)
- Noi, My, Us (Mantra Records) – DMCD90017 (1990)
- Sevilla X (As) – AS 001 (1992)
- Computer Dreams (Orlando Record) (1999)
- Danze (remastered, Orlando Records) (2000)
- La Boule De Neige (remastered, Orlando Records) (2000)
- Zonacalda (Ants) – ANT06 (2002)
- 2002 (Orlando Records) (2002)
- Open Space (Rai Trade) RTCD 290 (2008)
- PARADISE LOST VOL.1 (2017)
- PARADISE LOST VOL.2 (2017)
- PARADISE LOST VOL.3 (2017)

=== Collaborative albums ===
- Alvin Curran: Canti Illuminati - Fore (1982)
- Giovanna Marini: Le Cadeau de l'Empereur – Le Chant du Monde - LDX 74836/7 (1984)
- O.A.S.I.: Il Cavaliere Azzurro - Ira (1986)
- Aut. Vari: (Harold Budd, Roedelius ecc.): The Greetings Piano (Live) - Materiali Sonori – MASO CD 90034 (1993)
- Aut. Vari: Desert Rain – Desert Rain (1994)
- Quartetto Borciani: Razzmatazz - Felmay (1997)
- Piero Milesi: Within Himself – Cuneiform Records (2000)
- Aut. Vari: Frank You Thank Vol.2 (Tributo A Frank Zappa) – Il Manifesto- PdB 2002-013-2 (2003)
- Aut. Vari: Tribù italiche: Lazio EDT WM049 (2007)
- Aut. Vari: Il cielo Diapason DRCD-82 (2011)

== Bibliography ==
=== Books by Pierluigi Castellano ===
- Pierluigi Castellano, Le sorgenti del suono, ISBN 8888738592, DeriveApprodi (2004)
