= Hugh Herbert Wolfenden =

Canadian actuary and statistician

Hugh Herbert Wolfenden (13 January 1892, Pangbourne, Berkshire, UK – 26 May 26, 1968, Seattle) was a Canadian actuary and statistician, known primarily as a scholar and historian of the statistical research of Erastus L. De Forest.

Born in England, Wolfenden immigrated to Canada at the age of seventeen and worked as an actuary. For over twenty-five years, he was a consulting actuary in Toronto. In 1925 when four Protestant denominations merged into the United Church of Canada, he served as a consulting actuary in merging together the retirement plans of the clergy in the four different denominations. He retired in 1951.

He published numerous articles in actuarial and statistical journals. He was a vice-president of the Actuarial Society of America in 1940–1942. He was elected a Fellow of three learned societies: the Institute of Actuaries, the Royal Statistical Society, and the Society of Actuaries.

Wolfenden was an Invited Speaker of the ICM in 1924 at Toronto.

He is perhaps best known in learned circles for drawing attention to the almost forgotten work of an American mathematician, Erastus Lyman De Forest (1834–88), who, in the 1870s made important discoveries in graduation and statistics, some of them rediscovered by others decades later. Much of De Forest's work has current relevance and is being cited in research papers appearing in scholarly journals today.

== Selected publications ==
=== Articles ===
- Wolfenden HH (1923). "On the methods of comparing the moralities of two or more communities, and the standardization of death-rates". Journal of the Royal Statistical Society. 86 (3): 399–411. doi:10.2307/2341622.
- Wolfenden HH (1962). "On the theoretical and practical considerations underlying the direct and indirect standardization of death rates". Population Studies. 16 (2): 188–190. doi:10.1080/00324728.1962.10414876.
- Wolfenden HH (1940). "VI. The history and present position of health insurance discussions in the United States". Canadian Medical Association Journal. 42 (4): 382–386. PMC 537871. PMID 20321683.

=== Books ===
- Population statistics and their compilation. Actuarial Society of America, 1925, 144 pages.
  - Population statistics and their compilation. [Chicago] published by Univ. of Chicago Press for the Actuarial Soc. of America, 1954, 258 pages.
- Real meaning of social insurance; its present status and tendencies. Toronto, The Macmillan Company of Canada limited, 1932, 227 pages.
- Unemployment funds; a survey and proposal; a study of unemployment insurance and other types of funds for the financial assistance of the unemployed. Toronto, The Macmillan Company of Canada, 1934, 229 pages.
- Employment and social insurance act; Ottawa, J. O. Patenaude, 1935.
- Canadian medical association and the problems of medical economics; a series of articles by Hugh H. Wolfenden ... With a foreword by Dr. Wallace Wilson. Toronto, The Murray Printing Co., limited, 1941.
- Fundamental principles of mathematical statistics, New York, published by The Macmillan Company of Canada limited for the Actuarial Soc. of America, 1942.
