= Blackwood Miners Welfare Institute =

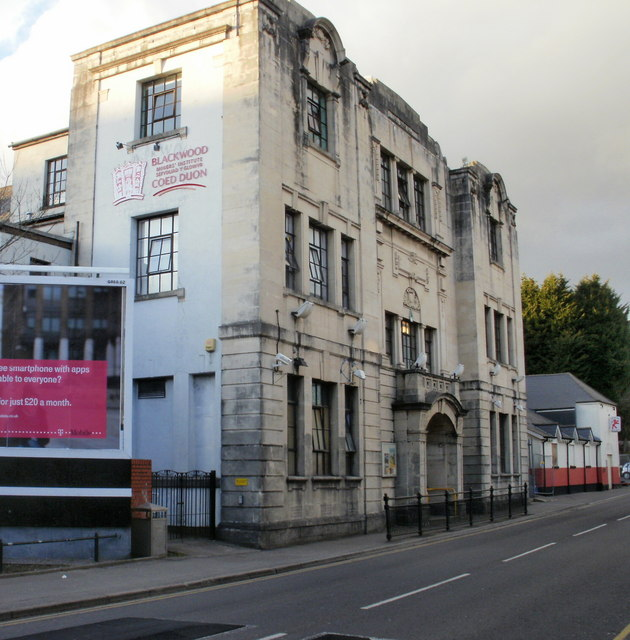

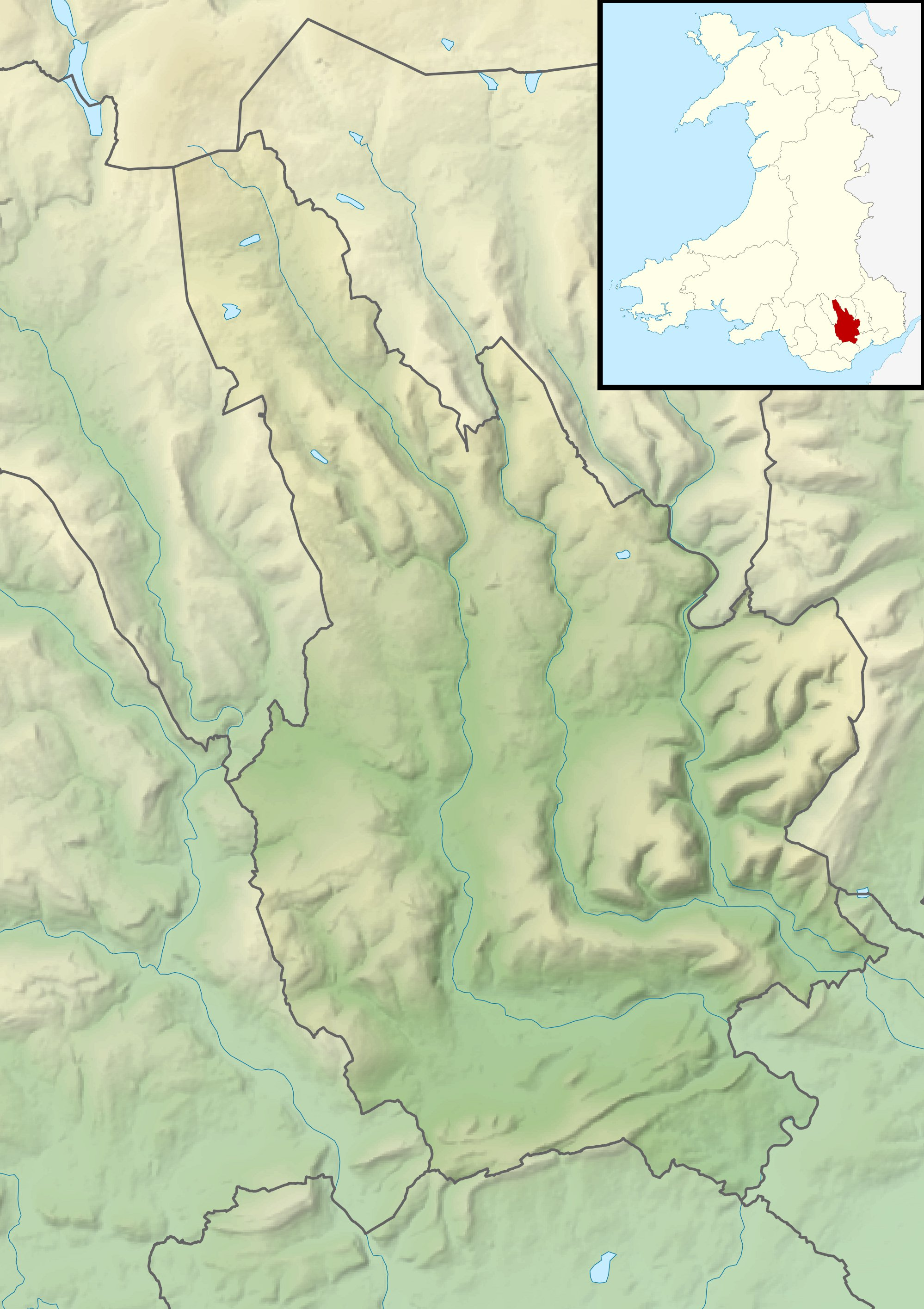
- Location within Caerphilly
- 51.6695°N 3.1959°W
- Type: Miners' welfare institute, now entertainment venue
- Location: Blackwood, Caerphilly, Wales

Site notes
- Governing body: Caerphilly County Borough Council

Listed Building – Grade II*
- Official name: Blackwood Miners Welfare Institute
- Designated: 31 May 2002
- Reference no.: 26710

The Blackwood Miners Welfare Institute (Welsh: Sefydliad y Glowyr Coed Duon) is an entertainment venue located at the north end of Blackwood High Street in Blackwood, Caerphilly, Wales and run by Caerphilly County Borough Council. Opened in 1925 as a miners' welfare institute, it originally was a single floor snooker hall but was expanded eleven years later. In the 1980s, the institute was the venue for some of the earliest performances by the Manic Street Preachers, a band formed in Blackwood in 1986. The hall was sold to Islwyn Borough Council in 1989 after falling into disrepair and was reopened as an entertainment venue in February 1992.

It is a receiving venue for comedy, theatre and music and a producer in its own right. Its co-productions with Black Rat Theatre Company tour across Wales. The institute is a Grade II* listed building. In July 2024, Caerphilly County Borough Council announced plans to close the venue as a cost-saving measure. A petition opposing the closure gained over 1000 signatures within a day of its launch.

== History ==
Blackwood Miners Welfare Institute was opened after the final stones of the building were laid on 4 December 1925 and was used as a single floor snooker hall owned by the Coal Industry and the Social Welfare Organisation. The local Miners Welfare Fund provided a £7,000 grant whilst miners raised £850 from their wages. Eleven years later two more floors were built which included a stage, auditorium, dance floor, reading room, library, ladies room and rehearsal rooms for local societies. In the late 1980s, the institute saw some of the first performances by the Manic Street Preachers, a band formed in Blackwood.

Blackwood Miners Welfare Institute fell into disrepair during the 1970s and 1980s due to pit closures, and the miners' weekly contributions failed to retain the operations of the building. Its trustees sold it to Islwyn Borough Council in 1989 who pledged to refurbish the building for local community use.

The building reopened on 17 February 1992 and it became an arts and entertainment venue with funding from Islwyn Borough Council and the Welsh Office. Blackwood Miners Welfare Institute is run by Caerphilly County Borough Council. It is a receiving venue for comedy, theatre and music and a producer in its own right. Its co-productions with Black Rat Theatre Company tour across Wales.

Caerphilly County Borough Council approved restoration work to the interior and exterior of the building in June 2011 and this continued into 2012. The building was closed on 17 March 2020 as a consequence of the COVID-19 pandemic in Wales and re-opened on 17 September 2021. In July 2024, the council announced plans to close the venue as a cost-saving measure. A petition opposing the closure gained over 1000 signatures within a day of its launch. (Note: Caerphilly County Borough Council simultaneously announced plans to close Llancaiach Fawr, citing annual subsidies for the institute at £347,000 and £485,000 for the manor house.)

Swansea University holds a collection of papers relating to the operation of the building in its archives. They include two boxes containing minutes of its committee from 1927 to 1945 and monthly accounts from between 1937 and 1945.

== Architecture and description ==
Blackwood Miners Welfare Institute is a free standing building. It has a stone facade with a symmetrical frontage of three bays and three storeys with the two outer ones featuring stepped parapets. The ground floor has rusticated ashlar piers without classical ornament to the pilasters and windows. It has the Memorial Theatre inside which has a grid and orchestra pit which can accommodate up to 30 musicians. It is flat-floored with a raked rear within the double-height auditorium that features little decoration and a curved barrel roof divided up into a series of decorated arches.

Blackwood Miners Welfare Institute is a Grade II* listed building; Cadw's listing record describing it as "an especially well-preserved workmen's institute, a building type characteristic of industrial South Wales, specially important for its social-historical interest in addition to retaining strong internal and external architectural character".
