= John Wolfenden, Baron Wolfenden =

British educationalist (1906–1985)

The Right Honourable The Lord Wolfenden CBE
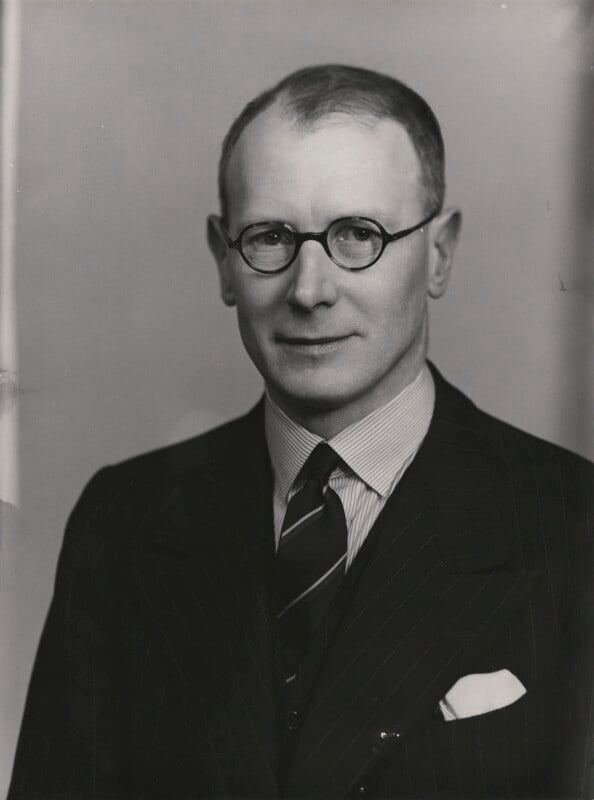
- Wolfenden in 1950

Director of the British Museum
- In office 1969–1973
- Preceded by: Frank Francis
- Succeeded by: John Pope-Hennessy

Vice-Chancellor of the University of Reading
- In office 1950–1963
- Preceded by: Sir Frank Stenton
- Succeeded by: Sir Harry Pitt

Personal details
- Born: 26 June 1906 Swindon, Wiltshire, England
- Died: 18 January 1985 (aged 78) Guildford, Surrey, England
- Education: Queen Elizabeth Grammar School, Wakefield
- Alma mater: Queen's College, Oxford

John Frederick Wolfenden, Baron Wolfenden, CBE (26 June 1906 – 18 January 1985) was a British educationalist known for chairing the Wolfenden Committee whose report recommended the decriminalisation of homosexuality in the UK. He was headmaster of Uppingham and Shrewsbury public schools.

== Early life ==
Wolfenden was born on 26 June 1906 in Swindon, Wiltshire, England. He was the son of George Wolfenden and Emily Hannah Gaukroger, both born in Halifax, Yorkshire. George Wolfenden became an official of the West Riding Local Education Authority based in Wakefield, West Riding of Yorkshire, where John attended Queen Elizabeth Grammar School. He won a scholarship to Oxford.

== Professional life ==
Having studied in Oxford, Wolfenden became a don at Magdalen College, Oxford, in 1929.

John Wolfenden was the headmaster of Uppingham School (1934–1944) and Shrewsbury School (1944–1950) and chairman of various government committees which mostly focused on education and problems with youth.

In 1950 he became Vice-Chancellor of the University of Reading and found time to write two books, Family Affair and The Steele Age, both part of the series of 'Take Home Books'.

From 1954 to 1957 he was Chairman of the Departmental Committee on Homosexual Offences and Prostitution, known in shorthand as the Wolfenden Committee after himself, whose report was published in 1957. Wolfenden had been appointed to head the committee by the then Home Secretary, Sir David Maxwell Fyfe to consider whether the existing laws on these should be changed. Maxwell Fyfe would later come to oppose the liberalisation of gay rights while sitting as Lord Kilmuir in the House of Lords. Geraldine Bedell noted the irony of this, and commented: "Perhaps he [Maxwell-Fyfe] thought, by handing over to a committee, to shelve the issue. Perhaps he assumed Wolfenden would find against, in which case, he chose a curious chairman, because Wolfenden had a gay son, Jeremy."

In 1957, Wolfenden chaired an independent committee initiated by the Central Council of Physical Recreation which investigated the role of various statutory and voluntary groups in sport in the United Kingdom. The committee published its report in 1960, and fifty years later it was still an influential work in its field.

In 1962, the Privy Council appointed Wolfenden as Chairman of the Council for the Training of Health Workers and the Council for the Training in Social Work, two bodies established by the Health Visiting and Social Work (Training) Act 1962.

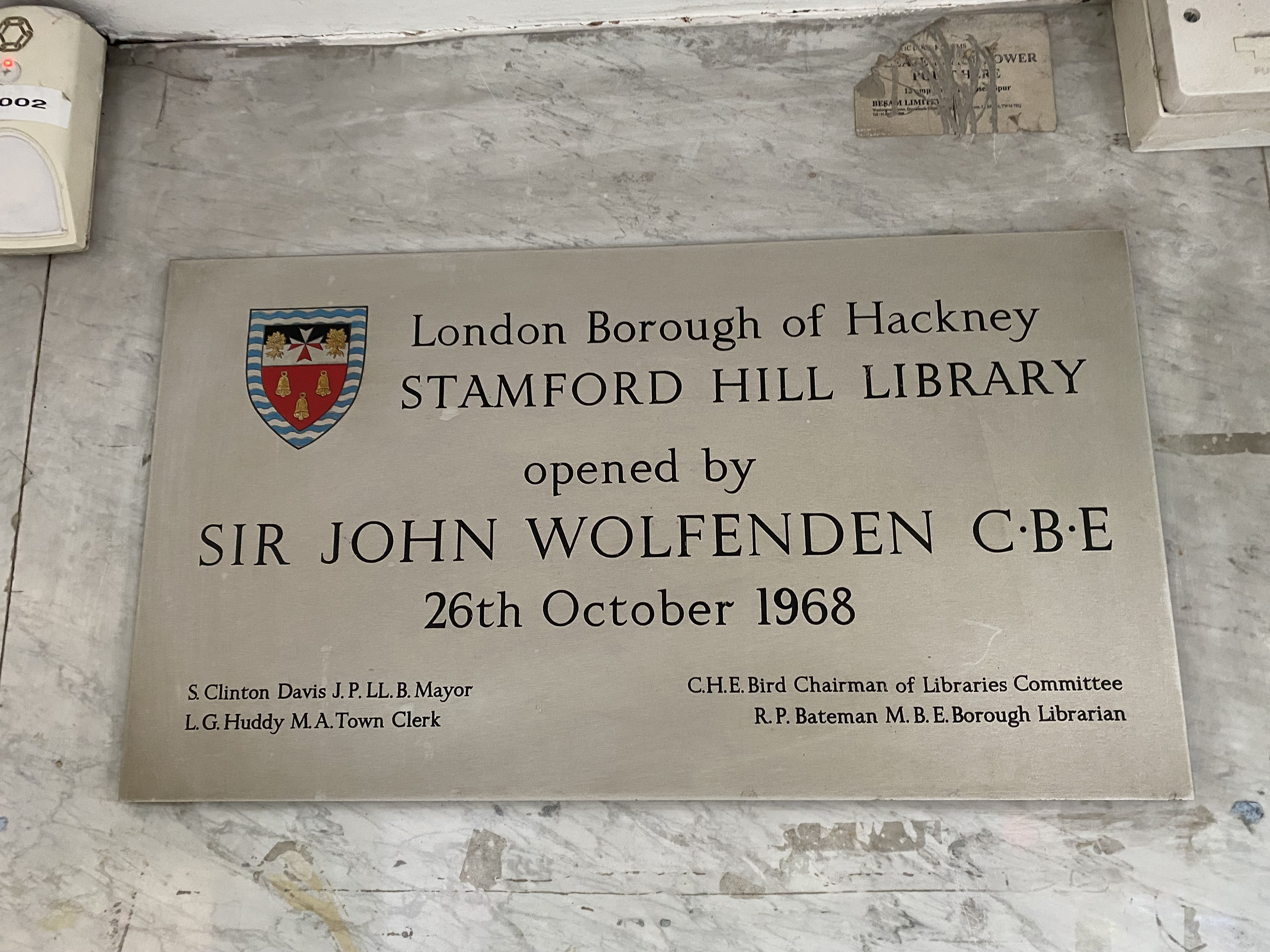
A plaque at Stamford Hill Library, Hackney, opened by John Wolfenden

Wolfenden was director of the British Museum from 1969 to 1973, became President of Chelsea College in 1972, Chairman of the Chelsea Building Society and Metropolitan Association of Building Societies in 1978.

== Personal life ==
Wolfenden married Eileen Spilsbury (1908-2004) in 1932, they had two sons and two daughters. His elder son was Jeremy Wolfenden, a foreign correspondent for The Daily Telegraph and a British spy.

He died aged 78, on 18 January 1985 in Guildford, Surrey, England.

== Thoughts and ideas ==
In his essay The Gap—The Bridge, Wolfenden discusses the problems with institutional dichotomy.

His memoirs were published by The Bodley Head in 1976, under the title of Turning Points.

== Titles ==
Wolfenden was appointed a Commander of the Order of the British Empire (CBE) in 1942, and was knighted in 1956.

He was created a life peer on 12 July 1974 with the title Baron Wolfenden, of Westcott in the County of Surrey.

== See also ==
- Wolfenden report
