= Jeremy Wolfenden =

British journalist and spy (1934–1965)

- Born: 26 June 1934; Uppingham, Rutland, England
- Died: 28 December 1965 (aged 31); Washington, D.C., U.S.
- Occupations: Journalist and spy

Jeremy John Le Mesurier Wolfenden (26 June 1934, England – 28 December 1965) was a foreign correspondent and British spy at the height of the Cold War.

== Biography ==
The son of John Wolfenden, headmaster of Uppingham School, and, later, chairman of the Wolfenden Report which recommended the legalisation of male homosexual acts in Britain, Jeremy Wolfenden was himself homosexual. He was regarded by others of his generation as a leader and a man of distinct individualism. He won a scholarship to Eton where he was known as 'cleverest boy in England', then to his father's alma mater Magdalen College, Oxford, where he obtained a first-class degree in Philosophy, Politics and Economics. He subsequently became a Prize Fellow of All Souls. His Finals examiner at Oxford, after giving him eight alphas, wrote: "He wrote as though it were all beneath him; he wrote as though it were all such a waste of his time."

He became night news editor of The Times in 1959 and the newspaper's Paris correspondent the following year. Wolfenden was recruited by the Secret Intelligence Service (SIS) before becoming The Daily Telegraph's foreign correspondent in Moscow (in 1961) where he indulged in his twin passions for sex and alcohol and was eventually compromised by the KGB. He struck up friendships with Guy Burgess, the British defector, and Martina Browne, the nanny employed by Ruari and Janet Chisholm, who were working for SIS and were instrumental in the defection of Oleg Penkovsky – a colonel in Soviet military intelligence – who was responsible for disabusing the Kennedy administration of the myth that the "missile gap" was in the Soviets' favour. Wolfenden subsequently came under pressure from both the Secret Intelligence Service (MI6) and the KGB while in Moscow. According to Neal Ascherson in 1996, he was being blackmailed by both services. He had been photographed by the KGB having sex with another man, while MI6 tried to turn him into a double agent. In 1964, he swapped roles with the Telegraph's Washington, D.C. correspondent, where he married Martina Browne.

He died on 28 December 1965, aged 31, in what appeared to be suspicious circumstances in Washington, D.C. It was claimed he had fainted in the bathroom, cracked his head against the washbasin and died of a cerebral haemorrhage. It is now thought likely that he died of liver failure brought on by his excessive drinking.

Wolfenden's own views survive. For instance, in a letter to Michael Parsons, an Oxford friend, from Paris, January 1961:

"There is just no such thing as anyone’s real personality. Personalities are the product of the initial feelings or attitudes someone takes up and the needs of the situation they find themselves in...and, for that matter, the initial feelings themselves are the product of earlier conflicts of that sort. There is a dialectic of personality, just as there is dialectic of history (and it’s just as unpredictable)."

A short biography of Wolfenden appears in the book The Fatal Englishman by Sebastian Faulks. Julian Mitchell's play Consenting Adults (2007), screened by BBC Four, is based on the relationship of father and son, played by Charles Dance and Sean Biggerstaff respectively. Biggerstaff won a BAFTA Scotland award for Best Television Actor for his performance.
