= Congress Theatre (Torfaen) =

Theatre in Torfaen, Wales

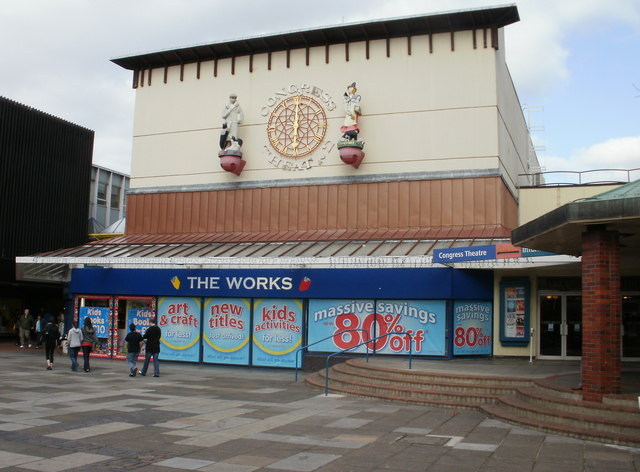
- Interactive map of Congress Theatre
- Address: Gwent Square; Cwmbran; Wales
- Coordinates: 51.6544°N 3.0210°W

Website
- https://www.congresstheatre.co.uk/

The Congress Theatre (Welsh: Theatr Congress) is the principal theatre in Torfaen. It is located in Cwmbran Centre, Cwmbran. The front of the building is dominated by a large clock with two figures named Dai and Myfanwy.

== Facilities ==
The theatre has a fairly large auditorium that hosts various plays, shows and concerts. There is also a café-bar adjacent to the auditorium.

== Performances ==
The theatre plays host to various in-house stage groups and external performances. Regular stage groups include the Cwmbran Woodland Players and the Congress Youth Theatre.

The Theatre boasts a lighting rig accessible by catwalk, with 12 way 16A IWB with internal DMX and various hanging points across 12 RSJ's. The theatres luminaire stock is currently in the process of being updated.

== Threat of closure ==
Faced with closure in the mid-1990s, the theatre's fortunes have increased substantially over the last ten years. However, there is still much more work to be done to convert the Congress into a premier performance venue.
