= Betancourt Bridge =

Bridge in Saint Petersburg, Russia

Coordinates: 59.9573°N 30.2654°E

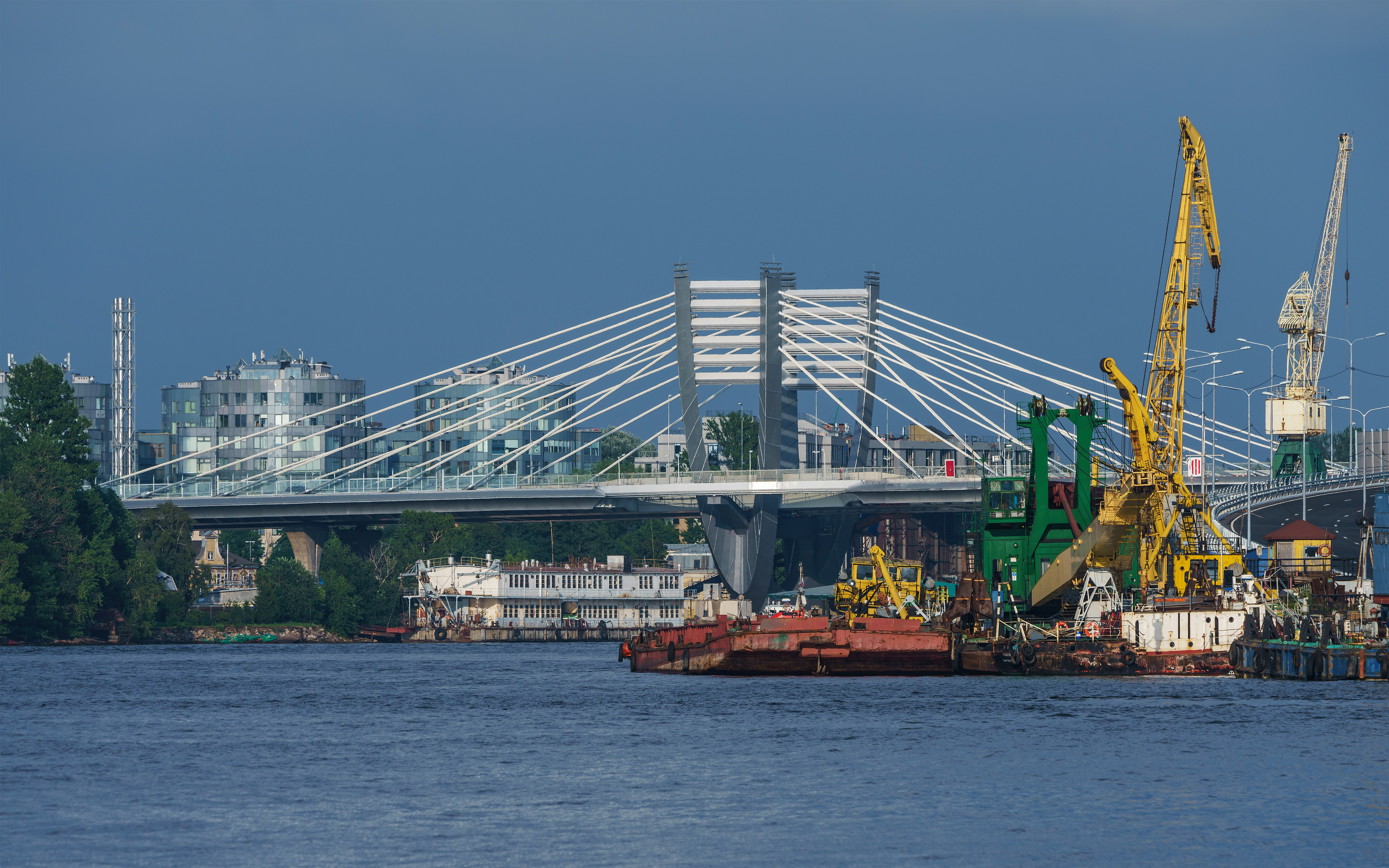
Betancourt bridge

Betancourt Bridge (Russian: Мост Бетанку́ра, Most Betankura) is a non-bascule 6-lane bridge with a cycle path in Saint Petersburg that opened in 2018. The bridge crosses the Little Neva and the Zhdanovka rivers, passing Petrovsky and Sernyy island, and connects the Vasilyevsky and Petrogradsky islands. The bridge is part of the Centre Transport Bypass (CTB), it allows non-stop traffic from Pulkovo Airport to the Krestovsky Stadium. First ideas to construct a bridge across appeared as early as in the 1980s. Since that time the design was changed significantly, instead of the straight lay the bridge became S-shaped in order to avoid the ‘Almaz’ military shipyard that was located on the bank of the Little Neva. However, the production was closed before the actual construction of the bridge even started.

It is named in honor of Agustín de Betancourt, a prominent engineer of Spanish origin, who worked on many architectural structures in Saint Petersburg.

The construction of the Betancourt bridge was followed by a series of city-planning scandals; several historical residential buildings were demolished under forged documents and fraudulent commissions.

The bridge was opened to traffic on May 13, 2018, however the works were still in process. The official commissioning permit of Rostechnadzor was issued only on March 26, 2019.

The project of the Betancourt bridge received several architectural awards for innovative design and technologies. However, critics point out its winding S-shaped route fails to comply with city roads safety regulations, the turns to road interchanges are very sharp. 6 lanes of the bridge stuck into 3-4 laned city streets provoking bottleneck traffic jams.

== Description ==
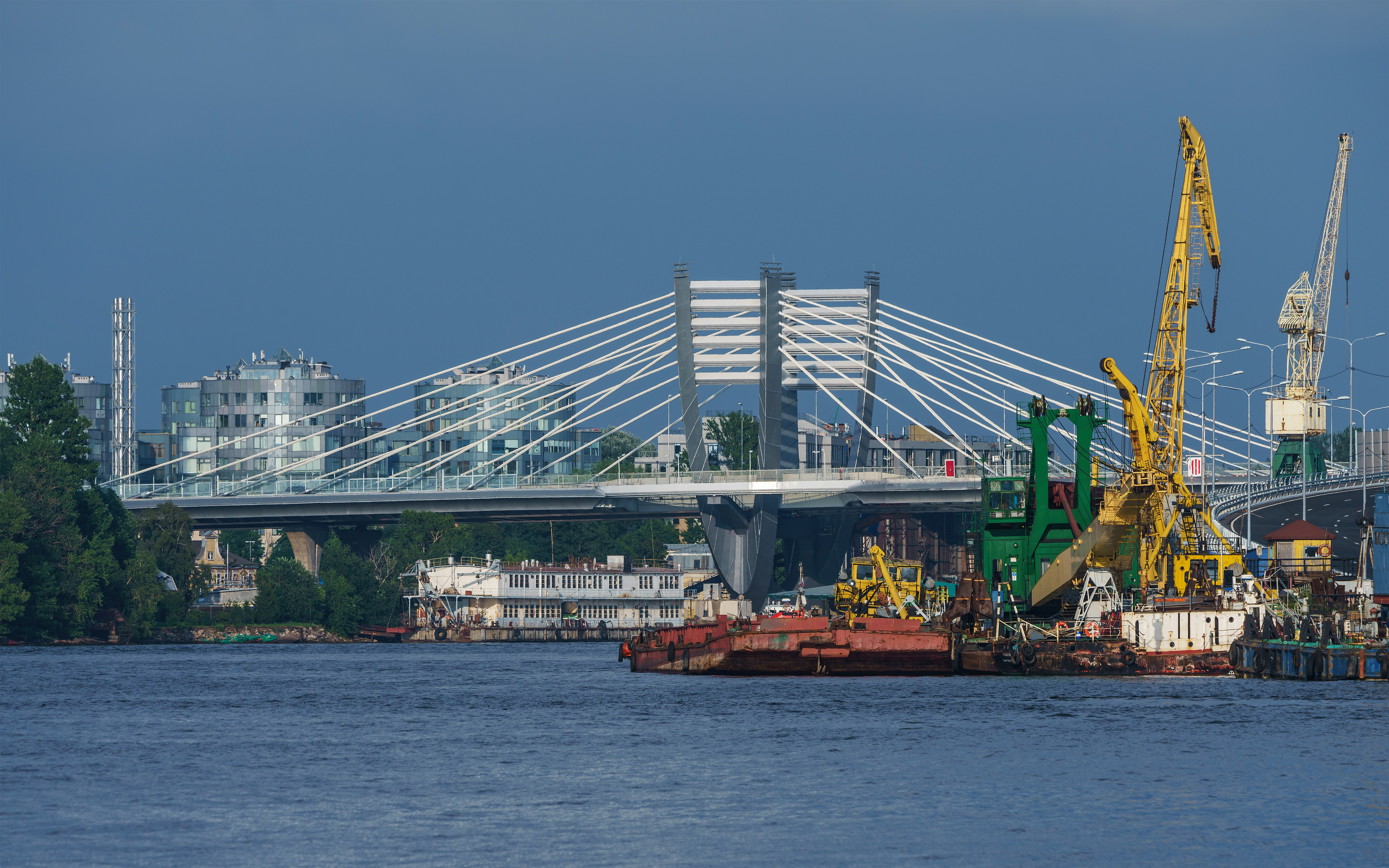
Betancourt bridge

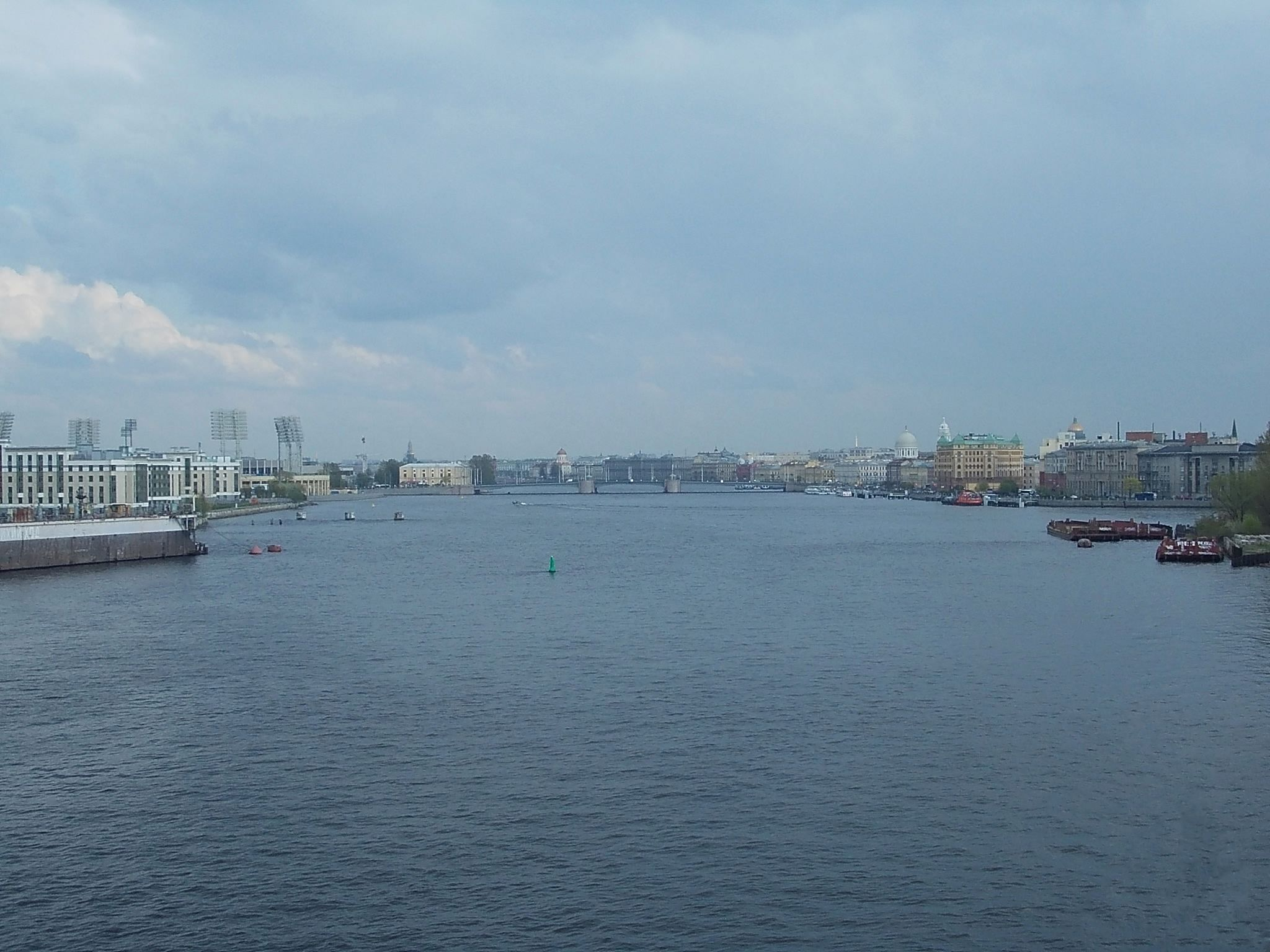
Facing the Tuchkov Bridge

The Betancourt bridge connects Dekabristov and Petrovsky islands, passing over the Sernyy island. The route goes from the Uralskaya street to Zhdanovskaya embankment and Novoladozhskaya str.. When moving from the Petrogradsky District there is an exit to the Uralskaya str. and Makarova embankment, connected to the Western High-Speed Diameter, Morskaya emb. and KIMa avenue. Moving from the Vasilyevsky Island, exits lead to the Petrovsky avenue, Zhdanovskaya and Novoladozhskaya str. to Pesochnaya emb.

== Structure ==
The Betancourt Bridge is a non-bascule cable-braced S-shaped bridge with the following technical characteristics:

- length — 923 m;
- total length (with approaches) — 1.25 km;
- width — 37 m;
- lanes — 6;
- height — 16 m;
- shipping span — 100m;
- bracing wires — 48;
- bracing wires length — from 31.7 up to 99.3 m.

There are several viewpoints, a bike lane and a sidewalk for pedestrians.

== Construction ==
=== Preparations ===
The General Urban Plan of Saint Petersburg had a project of a passage through Sernyy island to Uralskaya and Remeslennaya streets since the 1980s. The first tender for the construction was opened only in 2008 and cancelled in 2011 due to the economic recession. The authorities explained it with the intention to redirect funding to social programmes.

In 2012 Georgy Poltavchenko, the Governor of Saint Petersburg, announced the relaunch of the project in preparation for the 2018 FIFA World Cup. The bridge was planned as a part of the Centre Transport Bypass (CTB) and allow non-stop drive from Pulkovo Airport to the Krestovsky Stadium. It was meant to alleviate traffic on the Tuchkov Bridge and provide a bypass of downtown directly to the Petrogradsky District.> In autumn 2012, the federal government approved the project.

The new tender was opened and won in 2015 by the ‘Pylon’ private company. According to the original project, the bridge had a straight main span, but it was altered after protests of the military authorities, owners of the ‘Almaz’ shipyard on Malaya Neva bank. To avoid its territory, the construction was altered and the bridge got S-shaped form. In the middle of 2014 the documents were provided to Gosstroynadzor (construction regulatory agency) for consideration. By the time of construction start, the shipyard had been already closed and demolished, its territory had been sold to a private developer for real estate. The city could have purchased these lands to build a straight bridge as planned initially, but the authorities decided to free more space by demolishing several houses on Remeslennaya street instead. 38 different property owners were compensated to clear the space for the future bridge.

=== Works ===
The construction started in November 2015, however, without official permission. Gosstroynadzor didn't even receive the documents to review. First of all, the bridge was crossing a UNESCO Heritage object - Historic Centre of Saint Petersburg and Related Groups of Monuments. At the end of 2016 the Committee on State Control, Use and Protection of Historic and Cultural Monuments gave a negative conclusion to the project: the 90 m height of the main oval-shaped pylon violated the city regulations and ruined the historical panorama. The developer agreed to lower the pylon down to 44 m. However, he sued the city for breaking the contract and extra costs incurred by the modifications. The company had to buy additional new materials, change the installation scheme, 227 tons of structural steel remained unused.

The last block in the over-water length of the bridge was installed on April 11, 2017. By September 2017 the object was 62% ready, the cable system installation started in February 2018.

On March 29, 2018, the new bridge had been assigned the name of Agustín de Betancourt.

The documents authorising the construction were signed only in March 2018. However, the building permit was about to expire on May 31, 2018. The developer broke the deadline and failed to put the bridge into service in time - by May, 29. The first test traffic was allowed early in the morning on May 13, 2018, to football fans' shuttles. In the evening the citizens were allowed to the bridge. By that time the construction was not completely finished, welding and painting continued up to Summer. The commissioning permit of Gosstroynadzor was issued only in the next year, on March 26, 2019.

After opening, the local Transport Infrastructure Development Committee noticed a deterioration in traffic on Odoevskogo and Uralskaya streets.

=== Demolitions ===
To build the Betancourt bridge, the authorities had to demolish numerous buildings. More than 38 different property owners were offered compensations. People from several apartment buildings were rehoused.

The house No. 3 on Remeslennaya str. was built in 1906-1907 by the prominent architect Nikolay Verevkin.] According to the Saint Petersburg city law, the buildings constructed before 1917 are allowed to be demolished only in case of irreversible dilapidation. In order to find a legal opportunity to destroy the house, some unknown persons forged the construction date in the cadastral certificate. In 2015 the residents received notifications on property withdrawal for state needs. In the following two years, the residents and historic preservation activists made unsuccessful attempts to stop the demolition. Despite a huge scandal and wide media coverage, they tore down the house on August 26, 2017. Later the General Prosecutor office and the city police found out, that changes in the cadastral certificate were deliberately made on the basis of forged architectural evaluation. In 2016 a criminal case for forgery was initiated, yet it's not closed by August, 2021.

The apartment owners were offered inadequate compensations two times lower than the average cost per square meter of real estate on the local market, thus people could not afford to stay in their district.

The house No. 5 on Remeslennaya str. stays only 65 cm away from the Betancourt Bridge. According to the residents, their house started sagging after the construction of the bridge began, numerous cracks appeared on walls, bricks started falling out. Ground shaking caused pipe bursts in the basement. The construction noise disturbed people even at night for many months. Despite all residents' complaints, the administration of Petrogradsky district refused to rehouse them. In February 2018 governor Poltavchenko cited state Sanitary Rules and Norms that do not require any minimal distance between households and such construction sites. The governor also reassured that air quality and noise nuisance will be of standard. However, the sound barriers reach only the 4th floor of the building. The residents were rehoused only when an examination revealed hazardous mould in the building. However, only 15 families from 63 received new apartments by July, 2019. In the spring of 2020, the local HCS started accommodating migrant families in the house.

== Reviews ==
Various experts criticize the bridge's scheme. For instance, head of the Gosstroynadzor Eugene Kim called its proximity to residential houses ‘outrageous’. Meanwhile, the official presentation describes the bridge as ‘carefully built in the surroundings’. The S-shaped main span also receives a lot of negative reviews. The flection and sharp turns do not comply to the safety standards of city streets and often cause accidents. Exit to Novoladozhskaya and Pionerskaya streets became a ‘bottleneck’.

On October 10, 2019, the bridge's project received the ‘Unique Project of the Year’ award in the ‘Roads of Russia’ competition. In December 2020 the bridge was honoured with the First Prize in the International Professional Competition of Architects and Prospectors in ‘Best Innovative Project 2020’ nomination.
