= 12th Berlin International Film Festival =

1962 film festival in West Berlin, Germany

- Festival poster
- Location: West Berlin, Germany
- Founded: 1951
- Awards: Golden Bear: A Kind of Loving
- Festival date: 22 June – 3 July 1962
- Website: Website

Berlin International Film Festival chronology
- 13th 12th

The 12th annual Berlin International Film Festival was held from 22 June to 3 July 1962.

The Golden Bear was awarded to A Kind of Loving directed by John Schlesinger.

== Juries ==
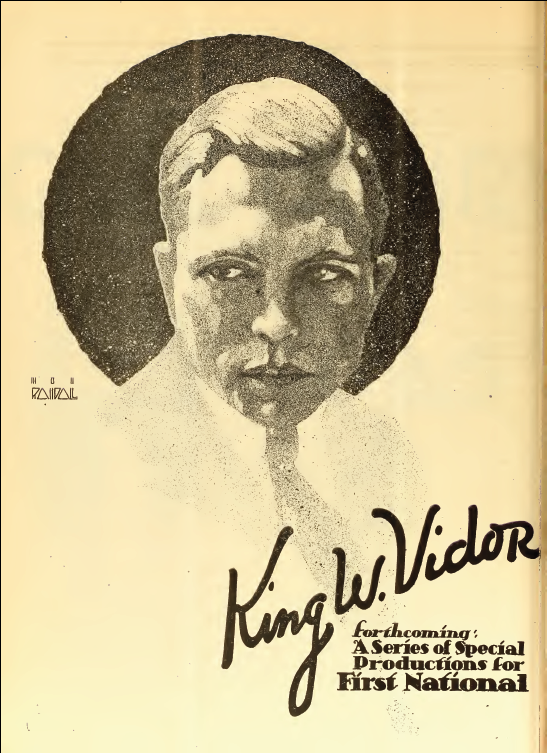
King Vidor, Jury President

The following people were announced as being on the jury for the festival:

=== Main Competition ===
- King Vidor, American filmmaker and producer - Jury President
- André Michel, French filmmaker
- Emeric Pressburger, British filmmaker and producer
- Hideo Kikumori, Japanese film critic
- Dolores del Río, Mexican actress
- Jurgen Schildt, Swedish film critic
- Max Gammeter, Swiss president of Filmgilde Biel
- Günther Stapenhorst, West-German producer
- Bruno E. Werner, West-German writer and art critic

=== Documentary and Short Films Competition ===
- Olavi Linnus, Finish writer and screenwriter (Finland) - Jury President
- Dorothy Macpherson, Canadian art film curator
- Abdellah Masbahi, Moroccan screenwriter
- Karl-Otto Alberty, West-German actor
- Pia Maria Plechl, Austrian journalist and writer
- Fridolin Schmid, West-German producer and director of Film and Picture Institute Munich
- A. L. Srinivasan, Indian producer

== Official Sections ==
=== Main Competition ===
The following films were in competition for the Golden Bear award:

English title	Original title	Director(s)	Production Country
A Kind of Loving		John Schlesinger	United Kingdom
A Train Leaves in Every Hour	Il y a un train toutes les heures	André Cavens	Belgium
The Backet-maker and the Miracle	El tejedor de milagros	Francisco del Villar	Mexico
The Duel	Duellen	Knud Leif Thomsen	Denmark
The Elusive Corporal	Le Caporal épinglé	Jean Renoir	France
The End of Summer	小早川家の秋, Kohayagawa-ke no aki	Yasujirō Ozu	Japan
Give Me Ten Desperate Men	Donnez-moi dix hommes désespérés	Pierre Zimmer	France, Israel
The Hands	Ta heria (Τα χέρια)	John G. Contes	Greece
Hum Dono	हम दोनों	Amarjeet	India
Little Presents	Pikku Pietarin piha	Jack Witikka	Finland
Love at Twenty	L'Amour à vingt ans	François Truffaut, Andrzej Wajda, Renzo Rossellini, Shintarō Ishihara and Marcel Ophüls	France, Italy, West Germany, Poland, Japan
Mitasareta seikatsu	充たされた生活 Mitasareta seikatsu	Susumu Hani	Japan
Mr. Hobbs Takes a Vacation		Henry Koster	United States
No Exit		Tad Danielewski	United States, Argentina
Out of the Tiger's Mouth		Tim Whelan, Jr.	United States
La Poupée		Jacques Baratier	France, Italy
Redhead	Die Rote	Helmut Käutner	West Germany, Italy
The Robbers	Los atracadores	Francisco Rovira Beleta	Spain
Salvatore Giuliano		Francesco Rosi	Italy
She Got What She Asked For	La bellezza di Ippolita	Giancarlo Zagni	Italy
Southern Storm	Badai-Selatan	Sofia W. D.	Indonesia
The Steppe	La steppa	Alberto Lattuada	Italy, France, Yugoslavia
Through a Glass Darkly	Såsom i en spegel	Ingmar Bergman	Sweden
Tonny		Nils R. Müller and Per Gjersøe	Norway
To the Last Day	이 생명 다하도록	Sang-ok Shin	South Korea
Under the Same Skin	Bajo un mismo rostro	Daniel Tinayre	Argentina
The Unscrupulous Ones	Os Cafajestes	Ruy Guerra	Brazil
Wife Number 13	الزوجة ١٣	Fatin Abdel Wahab	Egypt
Without Date	Ohne Datum	Ottomar Domnick	West Germany

=== Documentary and Short Films Competition ===
English title	Original title	Director(s)	Production Country
The Ancestors		André Libik	Nigeria
Galapagos – Dream Island in the Pacific	Galapagos - Trauminsel im Pazifik	Heinz Sielmann	West Germany
Nahanni		Donald Wilder	Canada
Stars at Noon	Le Grand Magal de Touba	Blaise Senghor	Senegal
Test for the West: Berlin		Franz Baake	West Germany
Venedig		Kurt Steinwendner	Austria
De werkelijkheid van Karel Appel		Jan Vrijman	Netherlands
Zoo		Bert Haanstra	Netherlands

== Official Awards ==
The following prizes were awarded by the Jury:

=== Main Competition ===
- Golden Bear: A Kind of Loving by John Schlesinger
- Silver Bear for Best Director: Francesco Rosi for Salvatore Giuliano
- Silver Bear for Best Actress: Rita Gam and Viveca Lindfors for No Exit
- Silver Bear for Best Actor: James Stewart for Mr. Hobbs Takes a Vacation
- Silver Bear Extraordinary Jury Prize: To the Last Day by Sang-ok Shin

=== Documentary and Short Films Competition ===
- Silver Bear, special award (Documentaries): Galapagos – Dream Island in the Pacific by Heinz Sielmann
- Short Film Golden Bear: De werkelijkheid van Karel Appel by Jan Vrijman
- Silver Bear for Best Short Film: Stars at Noon by Blaise Senghor
- Silver Bear Extraordinary Jury Prize:
  - Nahanni by Donald Wilder
  - The Ancestors by André Libik
  - Venedig by Kurt Steinwendner
  - Test for the West: Berlin by Franz Baake

== Independent Awards ==
=== FIPRESCI Award ===
- Zoo by Bert Haanstra

=== OCIC Award ===
- Through a Glass Darkly by Ingmar Bergman

=== Youth Film Award (Jugendfilmpreis) ===
- Best Feature Film Suitable for Young People: Give Me Ten Desperate Men by Pierre Zimmer
  - Honorable Mention: Little Presents by Jack Witikka
- Best Documentary Film Suitable for Young People: Galapagos – Dream Island in the Pacific by Heinz Sielmann
- Best Short Film Suitable for Young People: Zoo by Bert Haanstra
