= Horst Siewert =

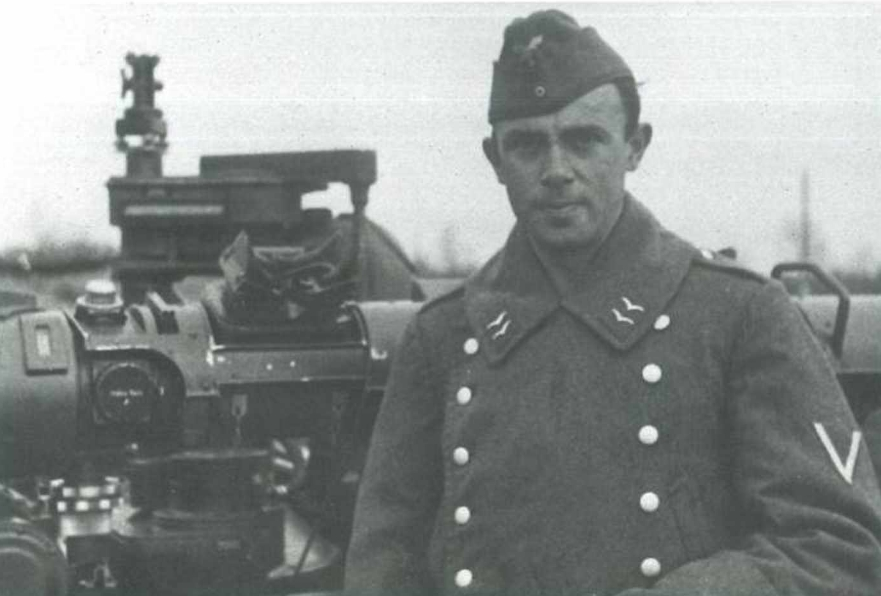
Siewert as anti-aircraft gunner in 1939

Horst Ivan Siewert (17 September 1902 – 20 June 1943) was a German forester, ornithologist, wildlife photographer, and pioneering wildlife film-maker. He established a research station at Schorfheide near Lake Werbellin and became a model for many subsequent German wildlife film-makers.

== Life and work ==
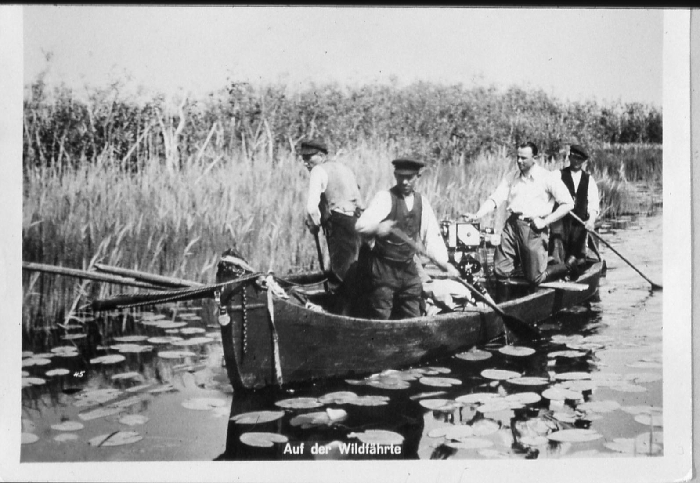
On a filming mission

Siewert was born on Petrovsky Island in St. Petersburg, Russian Empire, where his father Alexander Max Siewert (1873–1956) worked as an electrical engineer for Werner von Siemens, setting up electrical systems at the Tsar's winter palace. His middle name was after his uncle Ivan Siewert who worked as a forester in Dramburg, Pomerania, with whom young Siewert spent many holidays. The political unrest following the Russo-Japanese War made the family return to Germany but they did not go either to west Prussia where his father came from or to Mecklenburg where his mother Emma Sophie née Bade (1874–1968) came from, but instead moved to Berlin. He grew up with an interest in natural history, sketching birds from a young age. The family moved to a home on Lichterfelde-Ost in 1918 by which time he had siblings Ulrich (born 1905) and Luise (born 1911). At the age of eighteen he took up bird photography, documenting the life of the wryneck. He studied initially at Wilmersdorft and then with private tutors. He then went to the Realgymnasium at Lankwitz. As a boy he captured a sparrowhawk and spent much of his time training it. His studies were affected and he was forced to give up the bird. He passed his Abitur on the second attempt. He joined a forestry school in Zehdenick in 1923 and then moved to Grimnitz where his talents were recognized by the forester Erhard Hausendorff. He began to study the breeding of wild birds and conducted studies. He then studied forestry at Hann, Münden, and completed his studies at Eberswalde in 1928. He also did two semesters of zoology at Berlin. In 1929 he began to work near Virchow during which time he studied the biology of the lesser spotted eagle (Aquila pomarina). This was followed by studies on the black and white storks. He also studied goshawks and the white-tailed sea-eagle. In 1931 he joined the forestry service and was appointed forest assessor at Groß Schönebeck. He wrote a book on storks [Störche] in 1932. He was posted to Joachimsthal in 1934 where, two years later he became director of the research station set up by Hermann Göring. He attended the eighth International Ornithological Congress held in Oxford in 1934, presenting a talk on the nesting of osprey with lantern slides. He produced the film Das Jahr der Elche ("Year of the elk", 1936–37) which was shown during the International Exhibition in Berlin. He made a film on the life of great bustards and simultaneously began to work on his dissertation under Erwin Stresemann. In 1938 he received a Leibniz Medal (silver) from the Prussian Academy of Sciences. He received his doctorate in 1939. Siewert received a two-month training at Döberitz-Elsgrund in anti-aircraft operations and was posted at Gatow, Koblenz and later Bremen. He was made a sergeant with the Luftwaffe. In 1940 he was moved from military duty to teach hunting and wildlife management at the Eberswald Forestry Institute. Following the German occupation of Crete in 1941, Stresemann suggested that the region should be studied and documented by Siewert. Siewert visited Crete and recorded cinereous and griffon vultures apart from the edible dormouse. He made a second trip in 1943 and was shooting bezoar ibex when he lost consciousness and fell down a slope. An autopsy revealed that he had suffered from a heart attack. He was buried with military honours in Chania.

Siewert left behind a number of his sketchbooks, diaries, negatives and film. His collection of nearly 40,000 metres of film was lost in a fire and only some of the thousands of glass negatives survived and are now stored at the Schorfheide Museum since 1993. Heinz Sielmann considered him as a model film-maker, his own interest being triggered by watching the 1937 film on the elk.

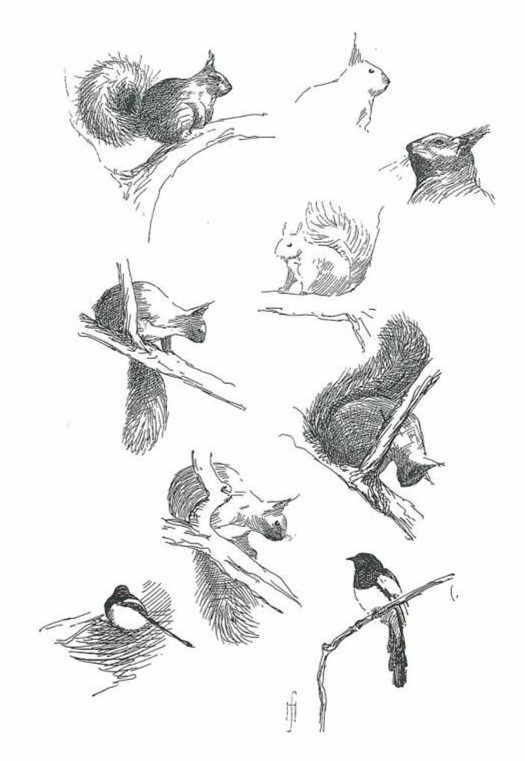
Page from sketchbook, 1923

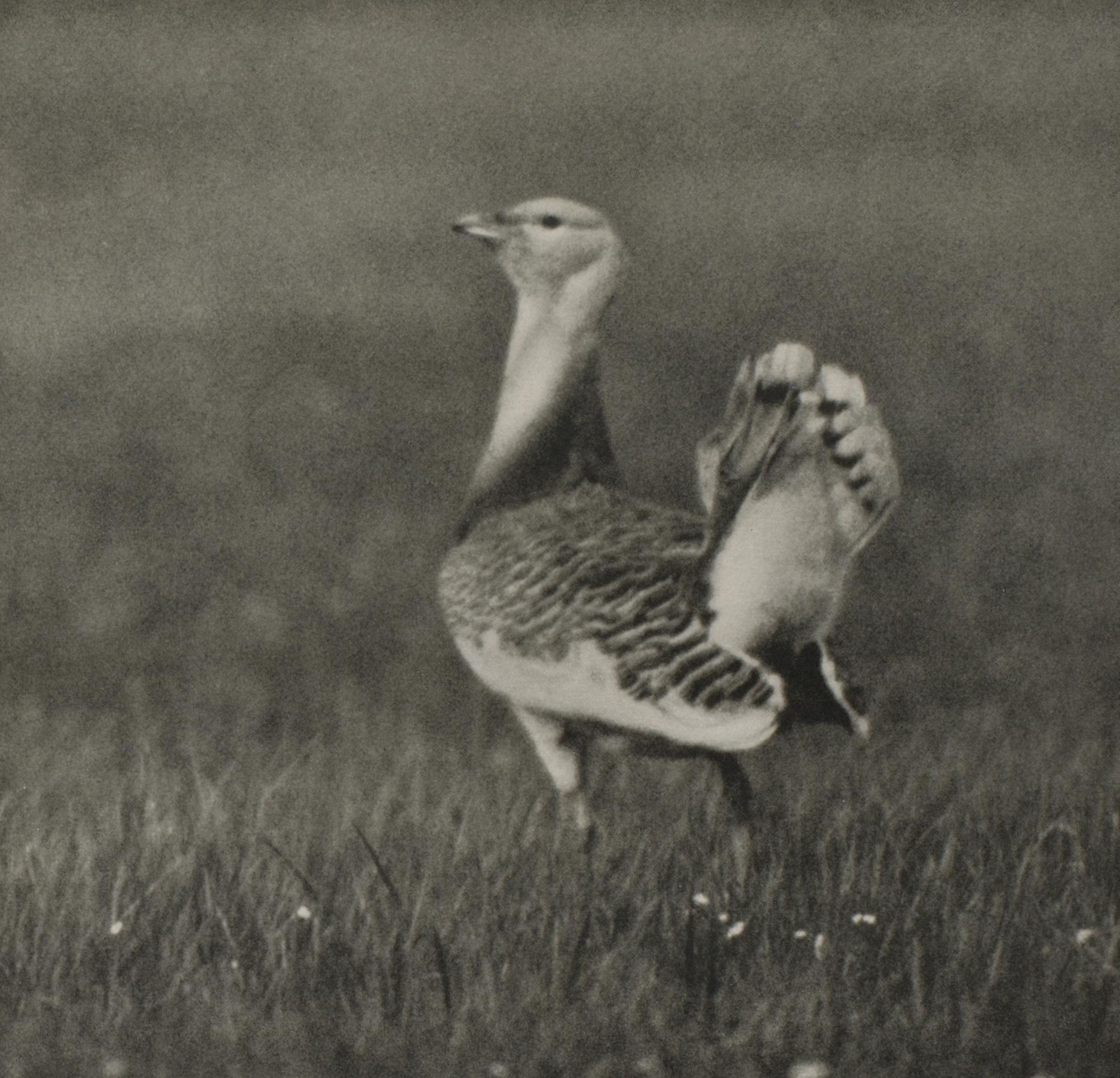
Great bustard photographed in 1938

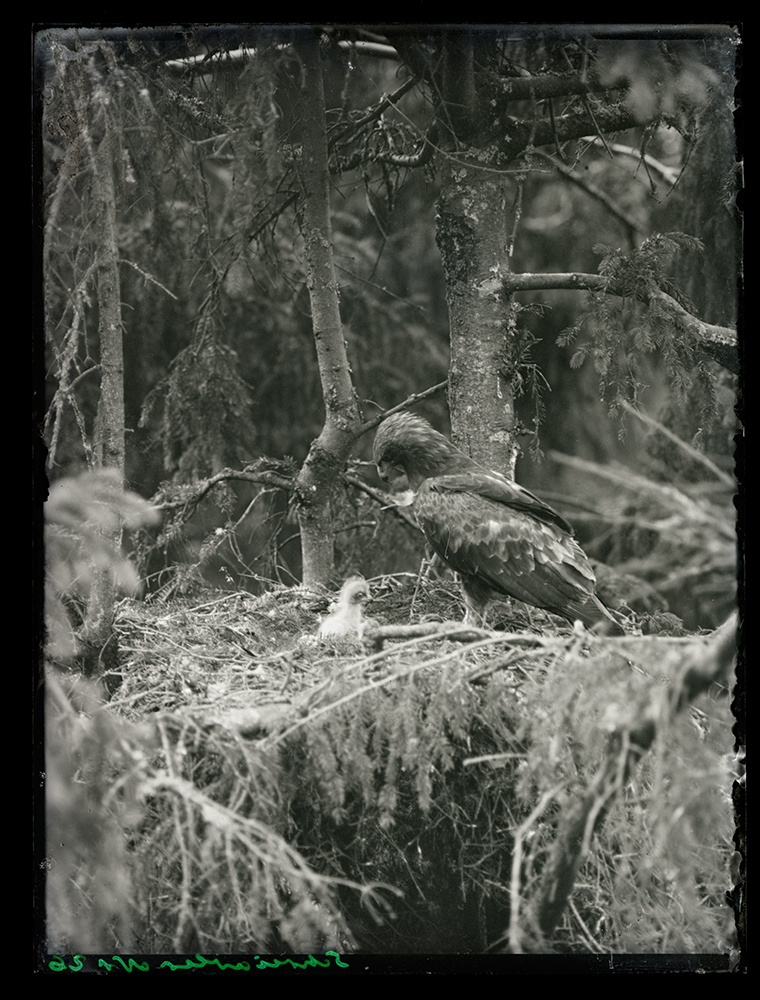
Lesser spotted eagle at nest, c. 1930
