= Pascale Audret =

French actress (1935–2000)

Pascale Audret (12 October 1935, Neuilly-sur-Seine – 17 July 2000) was a French actress who was most active during the 1950s through the 1960s.

== Career ==
While she starred in over 25 films between 1955 and 1968, her success never crossed over internationally. Her career in film, television, stage and music stayed in France. One of her most high-profile films came when she starred opposite Orson Welles in the 1961 film La Fayette. The following year she starred in Give Me Ten Desperate Men, which was entered into the 12th Berlin International Film Festival. In 1963 she starred in the film Chi lavora è perduto, the directorial debut of Tinto Brass.

== Personal life ==
Audret was born as Pascale Aiguionne Louise Jacqueline Marie Auffray to Henry Auffray, an industrialist, and Amyelle de Caubios d'Andiran, a musician, second cousin of the French author François Mauriac (respectively by their maternal grandfather and maternal grandmother). Her brother is singer Hugues Aufray.

Audret was married twice, first to actor Roger Coggio and later to music producer Francis Dreyfus. It was her second marriage that produced her daughter Julie Dreyfus, an actress who co-starred in Quentin Tarantino's Kill Bill & Inglourious Basterds. Audret put her career on the back burner after the birth of her daughter Julie in 1966.

== Death ==
Audret died in a road accident in 2000, aged 64. She was in the passenger seat of a car being driven by her companion.

== Selected filmography ==
- Mannequins of Paris (1956)
- An Eye for an Eye (1957)
- A Friend of the Family (1957)
- Dialogue of the Carmelites (1960)
- Give Me Ten Desperate Men (1961)
- Spotlight on a Murderer (1962)
- Chi lavora è perduto (1963)
- Two Are Guilty (1963)
- A Man in His Prime (1964)
- Countdown to Doomsday (1966)
- Oh God, Women Are So Loving (1994)
