= Patricia Viterbo =

French actress (1939–1966)

- Born: 21 March 1939; France
- Died: 10 November 1966 (aged 27); Paris, France
- Occupation: Actress
- Years active: 1963–1966 (film)

Patricia Viterbo (21 March 1939 – 10 November 1966) was a French film actress.

She died in a road accident in Paris when a car being driven by actor Henri Garcin crashed into the River Seine. Garcin survived but Viterbo drowned as she was unable to swim.

== Filmography ==
Year	Title	Role	Notes
1963	Jeff Gordon, Secret Agent	The nurse	
1964	Les Gros Bras	Nicole Rodin	
1964	Donde tú estés	Elka	
1964	Laissez tirer les tireurs	Patricia	
1964	Requiem pour un caïd	Éliane	
1964	Lucky Jo		
1964	The Gorillas	Claudine Carter	
1965	Bullet in the Flesh	Mabel Mestres	
1965	Ces dames s'en mêlent	Angelica	
1965	You Must Be Joking!	Sylvie Tarnet	
1966	Sale temps pour les mouches	Sylvie Gérard	
1966	Judoka-Secret Agent	Catherine Demange	
1967	Two for the Road	Joanna's Touring Friend	Uncredited
1967	Hell Is Empty	Patricia	(final film role)

== Bibliography ==
- Thomas Weisser. Spaghetti Westerns: The Good, the Bad, and the Violent. McFarland, 1992.
