= Ces dames s'en mêlent =

- Directed by: Raoul André
- Written by: Michel Lebrun
- Produced by: Jacques Roitfeld
- Starring: Eddie Constantine; Patricia Viterbo; Annie Cordy
- Cinematography: Claude Lecomte
- Edited by: Gabriel Rongier
- Music by: Pierick Houdy
- Production companies: Fida Cinematografica; Les Productions Jacques Roitfeld
- Distributed by: Compagnie Commerciale Française Cinématographique
- Release date: 6 January 1965
- Running time: 94 minutes
- Countries: France; Italy
- Language: French
- Box office: $7,659,937

Ces dames s'en mêlent is a 1965 French-Italian international co-production spy film directed by Raoul André and starring Eddie Constantine in a sequel to Jeff Gordon, Secret Agent (1963).

== Plot ==
Jeff Gordon is a financial agent of the FBI section that fights against counterfeiting of dollars. Gordon went to Paris to infiltrate and stop the tape forgers headed by Thomas the printer. His work is so perfect that counterfeits are difficult to detect. One of counterfeiters thinks he recognizes Jeff as a mobster who wants to take revenge on them.

== Cast ==
- Eddie Constantine as Jeff Gordon
- Patricia Viterbo as Angelica
- Annie Cordy as Lily
- Roger Dutoit as Angelo
- Carla Marlier as Wanda
- Hubert de Lapparent as Alfred
- Philippe Mareuil as Ericson
- Dorothée Blanck as Isabelle
- Jean Gras as Tony
- Guy Marly as Mario
- Manuel Vargas as Zacharoff
- Alain Nobis as Cora
- Jany Clair
- Nino Ferrer
- Dominique Zardi
