= Michel Lebrun =

French novelist

- Born: Michel Cade; 2 April 1930; Paris, France
- Died: 20 June 1996 (aged 66); Paris, France
- Occupations: Novelist, critic, scenarist
- Writing career
- Pen name: Michel Lenoir, Michel Lecler, Olivier King, Laurence Nelson, Pierre Anduze, Lou Blanc, Glop
- Notable awards: Grand Prix de Littérature Policière; 1956

Michel Lebrun (2 April 1930 - 20 June 1996) was a French writer of detective novels.

== Biography ==
Born in 1930, his real name is Michel Cade. He is a waiter when the author, translator and literary critic Maurice-Bernard Endrèbe urges him to send his manuscript to the Presses de la Cité. He won the 1956 Grand Prix de littérature policière with Pleins feux sur Sylvie.

== Works ==
=== Novels under the name of Michel Lebrun ===
- Alias un Tel, Paris, Presses de la Cité, 1956
- Pleins Feux sur Sylvie, Paris, Presses de la Cité, Un mystère No. 281, 1956; réédition Paris, Presses de la Cité, Presses Pocket No. 659, 1969; réédition Genève, Édito-Service S. A., « Les chefs-d'œuvre du roman policier », préface et bibliographie de Juliette Raabe, illustrations Marie-Christine Autin, 1973; réédition Paris, J'ai lu Policier No. 1599, 1984
- Expérience Midway, Paris, Presses de la Cité, Un mystère No. 294, 1956
- Faux Numéros, Paris, Presses de la Cité, Un mystère No. 307, 1956
- Un Silence de Mort, Paris, Presses de la Cité, Un mystère No. 317, 1957; réédition Génève, Éditions Slatkine, coll. Morts subites, 1981
- Prenez Garde aux Flots bleus, Paris, Presses de la Cité, Un mystère No. 322, 1957
- Candidat au Suicide, Paris, Presses de la Cité, Un mystère No. 330, 1957
- Catch à quatre, Paris, Presses de la Cité, Un mystère No. 347, 1957
- L'Hypothèque exclue, Paris, Presses de la Cité, Un mystère No. 372, 1957
- Malin et demi, Paris, Presses de la Cité, Un mystère No. 374, 1957
- Véronal, Paris, Presses de la Cité, Un mystère No. 383, 1958
- La Veuve, Paris, Presses de la Cité, Un mystère No. 401, 1958 (devenu La Corde raide au cinéma)
- La Caravane passe, Paris, Presses de la Cité, Un mystère No. 427, 1958
- Un Soleil de Plomb, Paris, Presses de la Cité, Un mystère No. 452, 1958; réédition; réédition Monaco, Éditions du Rocher, Les Maîtres de la Littérature Policière, 1987
- Permission de Détente, Paris, Presses de la Cité, Un mystère No. 464, 1959
- Pousse au Crime, Paris, Presses de la Cité, Un mystère No. 467, 1959
- La Tête du Client, Paris, Presses de la Cité, Un mystère No. 475, 1959; réédition Éd. Walter Beckers, Le Panthéon du Crime, 1973; réédition Paris, Librairie des Champs-Élysées, Club des Masques No. 534, 1984
- La Mort dans ses Bagages, Paris, Presses de la Cité, Un mystère No. 489, 1959
- Les Cartes truquées, Paris, Presses de la Cité, Un mystère No. 500, 1959
- A l'Américaine, Paris, Presses de la Cité, Un mystère No. 508, 1959
- Portrait-Robot, Paris, Presses de la Cité, Un mystère No. 516, 1960
- Dans un Jeu de Quilles, Paris, Presses de la Cité, Un mystère No. 532, 1960
- Quelqu'un derrière la Porte, Paris, Presses de la Cité, Un mystère No. 542, 1960; réédition Paris, Presses de la Cité, Un mystère No. 47, 1967
- De quoi vous mêlez-vous ?, Paris, Presses de la Cité, Un mystère No. 564, 1961
- Dans mon joli Pavillon, Paris, Presses de la Cité, Un mystère No. 580, 1961
- Le Rescapé, Paris, Presses de la Cité, Un mystère No. 595, 1961
- Forfait au Mariage, Paris, Presses de la Cité, Un mystère No. 604, 1962
- La Proie du Feu, Paris, Presses de la Cité, Un mystère No. 613, 1962
- Noirs Dessins, Paris, Presses de la Cité, Un mystère No. 653, 1963; réédition Paris, Presses de la Cité, Presses Pocket No. 943, 1972
- Attention au Barracuda, Paris, Presses de la Cité, Un mystère No. 666, 1963
- Au Tapis, Paris, Presses de la Cité, Un mystère No. 679, 1963
- La Peau du Serpent, Paris, Presses de la Cité, Un mystère No. 701, 1964
- Adieu les Idoles, Paris, Presses de la Cité, Un mystère No. 729, 1965
- Plus mort que vif, Paris, Presses de la Cité, Un mystère No. 739, 1965
- Le Délégué du Syndicat, Paris, Presses de la Cité, Un mystère No. 744, 1965
- L'Auvergnat, Paris, Presses de la Cité, Un mystère No. 1, 1966; réédition Paris, J'ai lu Policier No. 1460, 1983
- Adieu, les Espions !, Paris, Presses de la Cité, Un mystère No. 59, 1967
- Hollywood Confidentiel, Paris, Presses de la Cité, Un mystère No. 49, 1970; réédition Paris, J'ai lu Policier No. 2305, 1987
- Le grand Voyageur, Paris, Presses de la Cité, Un mystère No. 59, 1970
- Crime à tout Acheteur, Paris, Presses de la Cité, Un mystère No. 106, 1970
- Le Voyageur passe la Ligne, Paris, Presses de la Cité, Un mystère No. 115, 1970
- Un Revolver, c'est comme un Portefeuille, Paris, Presses de la Cité, Un mystère No. 123, 1971; réédition Paris, Librairie des Champs-Élysées, Le Masque No. 1970 (Les Maîtres du Roman Policier), 1989
- Les Ogres, Paris, Presses de la Cité, Un mystère No. 145, 1971; réédition Paris, Librairie des Champs-Élysées, Le Masque No. 1993 (Les Maîtres du Roman Policier), 1990
- Comme des Fous, Paris, Presses de la Cité, coll. Suspense, 1972
- Le Crime parfait, Paris, Julliard, 1973
- Sex-Voto, Paris, Presses de la Cité, 1975
- Autoroute, Lattès, 1977; réédition Le Livre de Poche Policiers No. 5176, 1978; réédition Rivages/Noir No. 165, 1993
- En attendant l'Été, Éditions PAC Red Label No. 20, 1979; réédition Paris, J'ai lu Policier No. 1848, 1985
- Le Géant, Lattès, 1979; réédition Rivages/Noir No. 245, 1996
- La Monnaie de la Pièce, Engrenage (collection) No. 17, Éditions Jean Goujon, 1980
- L'O.P.A. de 4 Sous, Engrenage No. 29, Éditions Jean Goujon, 1980
- Loubard et Pécuchet, Engrenage No. 54, Fleuve Noir, 1982; réédition Paris, Gallimard, Série noire No. 2415, 1996
- L'Envoûteur est dans l'Escalier, Engrenage No. 113, Fleuve Noir, 1984
- Les Rendez-vous de Cannes, Lattès, 1986
- Souvenirs de Florence, Paris, J'ai lu, coll. Flamme, 1987
- Rue de la Soif, Éditions Seghers, 1991
- L'Égarement, Éditions Baleine, Tourisme & Polar, 1998

== Filmography ==
=== As screenwriter ===
- 1958 : Cette nuit-là
- 1959 : À pleines mains
- 1960 : Les Lionceaux
- 1960 : La Corde raide
- 1961 : Dans l'eau... qui fait des bulles !
- 1961 : Dans la gueule du loup
- 1962 : Portrait-robot
- 1963 : Les Femmes d'abord
- 1963 : Des frissons partout
- 1964 : Banco à Bangkok pour OSS 117
- 1964 : Les Durs à cuire ou Comment supprimer son prochain sans perdre l'appétit
- 1964 : Laissez tirer les tireurs
- 1965 : La Tête du client
- 1965 : Ces dames s'en mêlent
- 1966 : Le Solitaire passe à l'attaque
- 1967 : L'Homme qui valait des milliards
- 1967 : Estouffade à la Caraïbe
- 1968 : Sous le signe de Monte-Cristo
- 1970 : Elle boit pas, elle fume pas, elle drague pas, mais... elle cause!
- 1973 : La Dernière Bourrée à Paris
- 1974 : Serre-moi contre toi, j'ai besoin de caresses
- 1974 : À vos souhaits... la mort
- 1974 : There's Nothing Wrong with Being Good to Yourself (Y'a pas de mal à se faire du bien)
- 1987 : Les Prédateurs de la nuit

== Awards and honours ==
- 1956 – Grand Prix de Littérature Policière for Pleins feux sur Sylvie.
- 1981 – Trophées 813 for Mon œil
- 1986 – Trophées 813 for L'année du polar 1987 : Tous les romans policiers publiés dans l'année, Ramsay
- 1987 – Grand prix Paul-Féval de littérature populaire
