= Titanic - Nachspiel einer Katastrophe =

1984 TV Film by Lutz Büscher

- DVD cover
- Genre: Courtroom Drama
- Based on: Die letzte Nacht der Titanic
- Directed by: Lutz Büscher
- Starring: Hans Korte
- Country of origin: West Germany
- Original language: German

Production
- Executive producer: André Libik
- Producer: IPV
- Production location: Unterföhring
- Cinematography: Alois Nitsche and György Illés
- Running time: 103 minutes
- Production company: Second German Television

Original release
- Network: NWDR
- Release: 16 March 1984

Titanic - Nachspiel einer Katastrophe (Titanic - Night of Catastrophe) is a West German television film courtroom drama that aired in 1984.

== Plot ==
The film centers around the United States Senate inquiry into the sinking of the RMS Titanic, from April 19 and May 25, first in the Waldorf-Astoria Hotel in New York City, and then the Russell Senate Office Building in Washington, D.C. The purpose of the hearings was to provide a platform for truth and justice to be served, as well as clarify the sequence of events. The public demands someone to blame, in order to narrow down the causes of the disaster into a single denominator. Smith seeks a comprehensive explanation and is not prepared to mince his words to reach a convenient solution. The film's central point is the witness statements, made by J. Bruce Ismay, Charles Lightoller, Archibald Gracie IV, and others. The film includes the captain of SS Californian, Stanley Lord, but the RMS Carpathia's captain, Sir Arthur Rostron, is notably missing.

== Cast ==
The film features a wide cast of both male and female characters:

- Hans Korte as Senator William Alden Smith
- Gisela Dreyer as Nancy Alice Osterhout, (named "Nana Smith"), Senator Smith's wife
- Veronika Faber as Maggie Malloy, Senator Smith's secretary.
- Volkert Kraeft as J. Bruce Ismay
- Sigmar Solbach as Second Officer Charles Lightoller
- Gunther Malzacher as Captain Stanley Lord, captain of SS Californian
- Benno Sterzenbach as Duncan U. Fletcher
- Arthur Brauss as Sheriff Joe Bayliss
- Tilli Breidenbach as Frau Schneider
- Towje Kleiner as Benoît Picard (named "Pickard", third-class passenger)
- Johannes Grossmann as an unnamed senator

== Production ==
The film was a joint project between the Hungarian television group IPV and Second German Television. The film's executive producer was André Libik, a Hungarian film producer living in Germany. The film was directed by Lutz Büscher, a German director and screenwriter. The film was filmed in Unterföhring, a municipality in Upper Bavaria near Munich.

== Release ==
The film initially aired on March 20, 1984, on Nordwestdeutscher Rundfunk (NWDR).

The film became available on DVD in 2018.
