= Blaise Senghor =

Senegalese film director

Blaise Adolphe Antoine Marie Senghor
- Born: May 30, 1932; Joal, Senegal
- Died: October 6, 1976 (aged 44); 15th arrondissement of Paris, France
- Occupations: film director, screen writer, UNESCO ambassador
- Notable work: Le Grand Magal de Touba (1962)

Blaise Adolphe Antoine Marie Senghor (also Blaise Wali Antoine Marie Senghor, Joal, now Joal-Fadiouth, Senegal, 30 May 1932 – Paris, France, 6 October 1976) was a Senegalese film director, screen writer and UNESCO Permanent Delegate and vice-chairman for Senegal.

== Biography ==
Born in 1932 in Joal, Senegal, to René Senghor and Hélène Conté, Blaise Senghor was a nephew of the first president of Senegal Léopold Sédar Senghor (1906 – 2001). After attending the Lycée Van Vollenhoven (later renamed Lycée Lamine Guèye) at Dakar, he studied at the Institut des hautes études cinématographiques (IDHEC) in Paris during 1958 - 1960. He obtained a teacher's Diplôme d'études supérieures in Languages and Classical literature, and a Bachelor of Arts (Licence de lettres) as well.

As a filmmaker Blaise Senghor became known for Qui trop embrasse (1962, Series 1 episode 18 of Les cinq dernières minutes) and Le grand Magal de Touba (1962), documenting the eponymous Sufi Islamic festival. He acted in Senegal as an executive producer of Yves Ciampi's film Liberté I.

After a stroke made it impossible to continue a filmmaker, Senghor started working at the Senegalese Embassy in Paris. He served Senegal as a UNESCO Permanent Delegate (ambassador) in Paris and was one of the vice-chairmen of the executive board (1972-1974) under the Senegalese Director-General Amadou-Mahtar M'Bow. He died on 6 October 1976 in Paris, France. The Centre culturel de Dakar Blaise Senghor was named after him at its start in 1976.

== Filmography ==
Senghor's films include:

Year	Film	Genre	Role	Duration
1960	Qui trop embrasse (Series 1 episode 18 of Les cinq dernières minutes)	Drama/Crime, TV episode	Assistant director	90 min (m)
1962	Le Grand Magal à Touba (also Le Grand Magal de Touba)	Short, documentary	Director, screen writer with Thomas Diop	25 m
1962	Liberté I by Yves Ciampi	Drama	Producer	89 m
1974	Joal	Short	Director	

== Award ==
- Silver Bear for Best Short Film for Le Grand Magal de Touba at the Berlin International Film Festival 1962.

== Bibliography ==
- "Le cinéma et l'Afrique: Jean Rouch, Georges Sadoul, Blaise Senghor, Paulin Vieyra avec les élèves africains de l'I.D.H.E.C.". La Vie Africaine (in French) (15). Paris. 1961. OCLC 26849020. Numéro spécial.
