= Tuchkov Bridge =

Bascule bridge in St Petersburg, Russia

Coordinates: 59.9491°N 30.2854°E

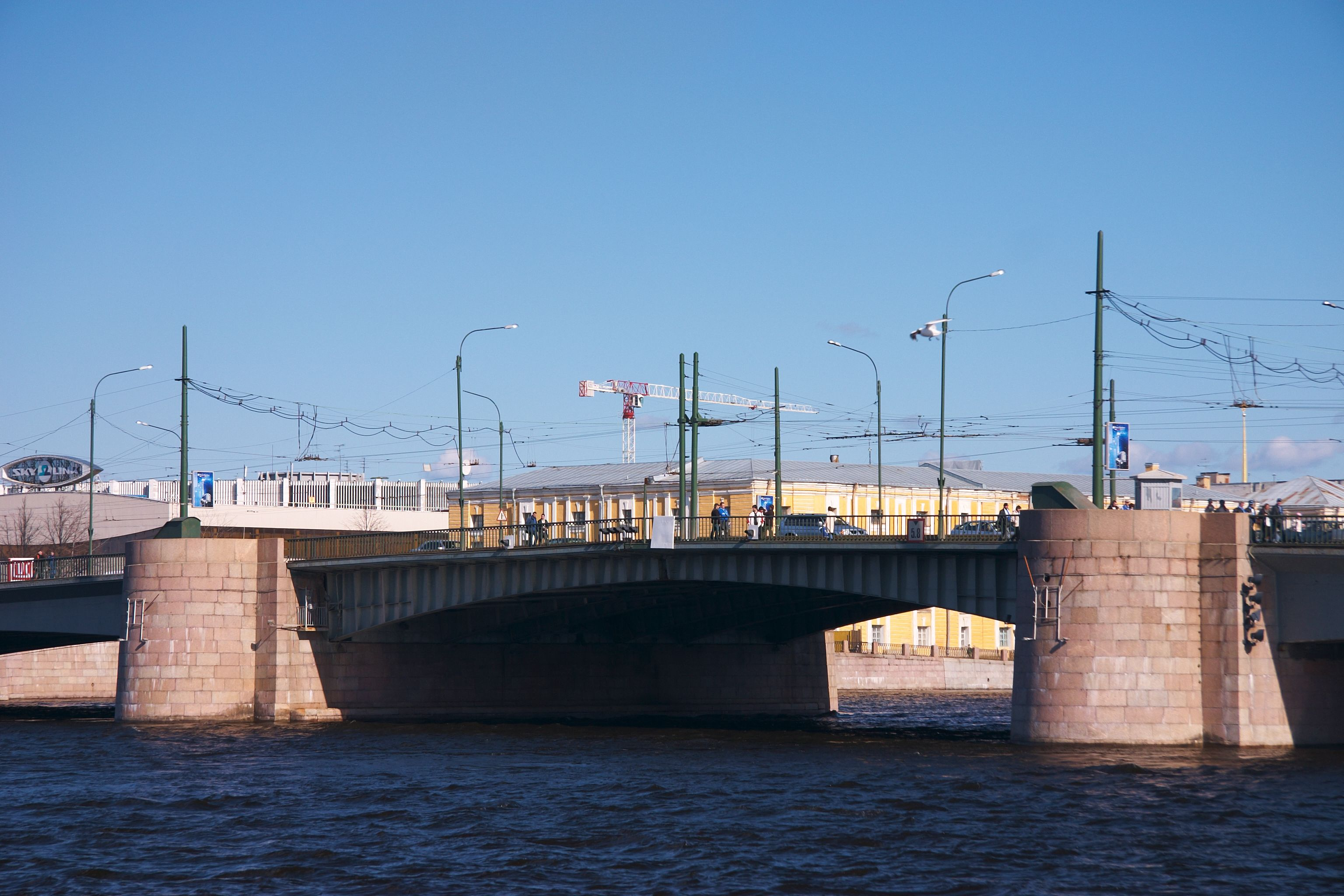
Tuchkov Bridge

Tuchkov Bridge (Russian: Ту́чков мост) is a bascule bridge across Little Neva (a distributary of Neva river) in Saint Petersburg, Russia. Its length is 226 meters and its width is 36 meters. Tuchkov bridge connects Vasilievsky Island and Petrogradsky Island.

== History and present state ==
The original bridge was built in 1758 in wood. It got its name after local businessman Avraam Tuchkov who financed its construction and who had warehouses nearby. The bridge has been reconstructed several times. Last time it was reconstructed in 1962-1965. Modern Tuchkov bridge has three spans, the middle one being a draw span. Unlike older bridges in St. Petersburg, the design of Tuchkov bridge lacks permanent decorations. In 2010s it is yearly decorated with electric lights to be seen from Birzhevoy Bridge for winter season.

== Tram service ==
In the early years of 21st century this bridge was left as the only tram service link leading from Vassilievskiy Island. The remaining service (Routes 6 and 40) takes passengers from the island, relieving its rush-hour-crowded Vassileostrosvskaya metro station via much less busy Sportivnaya metro station and, again, busy Gorkovskaya metro station on the main island of Petrogradskiy District, to Vyborgskiy District in the north bank of the Neva. All other tram lines over bridges from Vassilievskiy Island have been removed together with severe reduction in the number of tram routes still popular especially with lower-income population groups, and even the other line from Tuchkov Bridge branching off to Chkalovskiy Prospect (left turn from the bridge) was closed. There may be observed certain tensions between the growing number of car owners and underprivileged users of public transportations. There used to be about a dozen tram routes in and out of Vassilievskiy Island before the reduction in 1990s, while even the renovated to be quieter the Sredniy Prospect tram line (virtually the only one remaining in the island) was nearly permanently closed soon after renovation.

== In culture ==
Arkady Svidrigailov, the character from Dostoevsky's novel Crime and Punishment, spends the last night of his life looking into water of Little Neva from Tuchkov bridge. Anastasiya Chebotarevskaya, a writer and the wife of a decadent early XXc "Silver Age of Russian Poetry" poet Fyodor Sologub, who lived not far away on the embankment of Zhdanovka river, killed herself by jumping from the bridge.

== Future plans ==
The bridge, subject to daily traffic congestions as a major city north-south link, may be closed for another set of cardinal renovation. This can be expected after the finishing of supposed repairs to Palace Bridge and completion of Western Fast Diameter highway. A closing of the bridge is also planned for the time of repeatedly put off building of a travelator tunnel as a connection, in parallel to the bridge, between the existing underground-only Sportivnaya (Saint Petersburg Metro) station on the south bank of Little Neva and the station's possible northern exit to Admiral Makarov Embankment on Vasilievskiy Island to give easier metro access to the people living and/or working on the island who have problems with that during rush hour at the Island's Vasileostrovskaya - the only station in its western part with its many businesses and colleges, as well as housing.

== See also ==
- List of bridges in Saint Petersburg
