= Karl Schröder (cinematographer) =

German cinematographer (1912–1996)

- Born: 7 February 1912; Bad Schandau, Saxony, German Empire
- Died: 31 March 1996 (aged 84); Siegsdorf, Bavaria, Germany
- Occupation: Cinematographer

Karl Schröder (1912–1996) was a German cinematographer. During the 1930s he worked on Kulturfilms for UFA. In the 1950s he began working on feature films, many of them shot at the Göttingen Studios. He was also employed for television production.

== Selected filmography ==
- She (1954)
- Mamitschka (1955)
- Roman einer Siebzehnjährigen (1955)
- In Hamburg When the Nights Are Long (1956)
- Like Once Lili Marleen (1956)
- The Hunter from Roteck (1956)
- Lockvogel der Nacht (1959)
- Two Times Adam, One Time Eve (1959)
- Hunting Party (1959)
- Doctor Sibelius (1962)
- Zwei Whisky und ein Sofa (1963)
- A Man in His Prime (1964)
- Kurzer Prozeß (1967)

== Bibliography ==
- Cowie, Peter & Elley, Derek. World Filmography: 1967. Fairleigh Dickinson University Press, 1977.
