= Give Me Ten Desperate Men =

1962 film

- Directed by: Pierre Zimmer
- Written by: Pierre Zimmer; Alain Kaminker
- Starring: Pascale Audret
- Cinematography: André Dumaître
- Release date: June 1962
- Running time: 112 minutes
- Countries: France; Israel
- Language: French

Give Me Ten Desperate Men (French: Donnez-moi dix hommes désespérés) is a 1962 French drama film directed by Pierre Zimmer. It was entered into the 12th Berlin International Film Festival.

== Cast ==
- Gila Almagor
- Pascale Audret as Sara
- Catherine Berg
- Philippe Clair
- Francis Lax
- Jacques Riberolles
