= The Nabob Affair =

1960 film

- Directed by: Ralph Habib
- Written by: Jean Bernard-Luc; Sacha Guitry
- Produced by: Jacques Schatz; Rüdiger von Hirschberg
- Starring: Paul Guers; Perrette Pradier; O.E. Hasse
- Cinematography: Pierre Petit
- Edited by: A. Lautenbach
- Music by: Jean Wiener
- Production companies: Civa; Del Duca Films; Neue Emelka; Record
- Distributed by: Europa-Filmverleih; Lux Compagnie Cinématographique de France
- Release date: 16 November 1960
- Running time: 90 minutes
- Countries: France; West Germany
- Language: French

The Nabob Affair (French: Au voleur!, German: Affäre Nabob) is a 1960 French-West German comedy film directed by Ralph Habib and starring Paul Guers, Perrette Pradier and O.E. Hasse.

== Cast ==
- Paul Guers as Serge
- Perrette Pradier as Amenita
- O.E. Hasse as Le Nabab
- Sonja Ziemann as La milliardaire
- Mary Marquet as L'hôtelière
- Georges Alban as Commissar
- Gérard Darrieu
- Jean-Pierre Lorrain
- Jean-Pierre Zola as Hotel director

== Bibliography ==
- Philippe Rège. Encyclopedia of French Film Directors, Volume 1. Scarecrow Press, 2009.
