= Bullet in the Flesh =

1964 film

Bullet and the Flesh
- Directed by: Marino Girolami
- Screenplay by: Gino De Santis
- Story by: Gino De Santis
- Starring: Rod Cameron; Patricia Viterbo; Enio Girolami
- Cinematography: Mario Fioretti
- Edited by: Enzo Girolami
- Music by: Carlo Savina
- Production companies: Marco Film; Cinéurop, Neuilly-sur-Seine; Hesperia Films
- Distributed by: Panta Cinematografica
- Release date: 1964
- Running time: 93 minute
- Countries: Italy; Spain; France

Bullet in the Flesh (Italian: Il piombo e la carne) is a 1964 Spaghetti Western film directed by Marino Girolami.

== Plot ==
Problems develop when a lumber baron Nathaniel Master's daughter Mabel falls in love with the Indian chief of the Cherokees whose land he wants to steal.

== Cast ==
- Rod Cameron as Nathaniel Masters
- Patricia Viterbo as Mabel Masters
- Ennio Girolami as Sam Masters
- Bruno Piergentili as Chata
- Manuel Zarzo as Nelson Masters
- Consalvo Dell'Arti as judge
- Dante Maggio as Bob Raskin
- Enzo Maggio as client
- Carla Calò as Peggy
- Alfredo Mayo as Mortimer Lasky
- Piero Lulli as Jonathan
- Tota Alba as Minnie

== Production ==
Bullet in the Flesh's screenplay and story were created by Gino De Santis De Santis' story differed from other European Western's released between 1964 and 1966 which usually depicted cavalry heroes and Indian villains with author Kevin Grant stated that they "showed little interest in Native Americans as people." Grant stated that De Santis's story was a rare exception from the period where it was sympathetic towards the Cherokee tribe whose woodland idyll is under threat from a bigoted white logging family.

== Release ==
Bullet in the Flesh was first distributed in 1964. It was distributed by Panta Cinematografica in Italy.
