= Pierre Zimmer =

French actor

- Zimmer in Le deuxième souffle (1966)
- Born: 15 December 1927; Paris, France
- Died: 22 May 2010 (aged 82)
- Occupations: Actor; Film director
- Years active: 1949–2001

Pierre Zimmer (15 December 1927 – 22 May 2010) was a French actor and film director. He appeared in more than 30 films and television shows between 1966 and 2001. In 1962 he directed the film Give Me Ten Desperate Men, which was entered into the 12th Berlin International Film Festival.

== Filmography ==
Director

- Give Me Ten Desperate Men (1962)
- Judoka-Secret Agent (1966)

=== Film ===
- Le deuxième souffle (1966) – Orloff
- Qualcuno ha tradito (1967)
- Life Love Death (1969) – L'officier de police
- La Promesse (1969) – Philippe
- Eden and After (1970) – Duchemin
- Le Voyou (1970) – Martine's Husband
- N. a pris les dés... (1971)
- Escape to Nowhere (1973) – Le nouveau mari de Maria
- OK patron (1974) – Pascal Costi
- And Now My Love (1974)
- Gloria (1977) – Hervé de Clermont
- Flashing Lights (1978) – Paul Raymond, Monique's father
- Comment se faire réformer (1978) – Le capitaine
- Madame Claude 2 (1981) – McBride
- Keeping Track (1986) – Jamisson
- Aux yeux du monde (1991) – Le Procureur Latour
- XXL (1997) – Baptiste Bourdalou

=== Television ===
ACTOR television credits
Year	Title	Role	Notes	Ref.
1983	Illusions	Dr. Pascal	TV movie	
1986	Sword of Gideon	Surgeon	TV movie	
1992	Counterstrike	Unknown	Episode: "La Belle Dame Monique" (S2.E19)	
