= A Man in His Prime =

1964 film

- German film poster
- German: Ein Mann im schönsten Alter
- Directed by: Franz Peter Wirth
- Written by: Rudolf Schneider (novel); Oliver Storz; Franz Peter Wirth
- Starring: Karl Michael Vogler; Pascale Audret; Françoise Prévost
- Cinematography: Karl Schröder
- Music by: George Gruntz
- Production company: Maran Film
- Release date: 17 January 1964
- Running time: 109 minutes
- Country: West Germany
- Language: German

A Man in His Prime (German: Ein Mann im schönsten Alter) is a 1964 West German drama film directed by Franz Peter Wirth and starring Karl Michael Vogler, Pascale Audret and Françoise Prévost.

The film's sets were designed by the art director Rolf Zehetbauer.

== Cast ==
- Karl Michael Vogler as Richard Mertens
- Pascale Audret as Eva
- Françoise Prévost as Lucy
- Marisa Mell as Brigitte
- Hellmut Lange as Ferrow
- Hans Caninenberg as Alfred von Xanten
- Sigfrit Steiner as Kriminalinspektor Scherbl
- Rosemarie Fendel as Margot
