= Judoka-Secret Agent =

- Theatrical release poster
- Directed by: Pierre Zimmer
- Written by: Jacques Guymont; Pierre Zimmer
- Starring: Jean-Claude Bercq; Marilù Tolo; Perrette Pradier; Patricia Viterbo; Henri Garcin
- Cinematography: Gilbert Sarthre
- Edited by: Geneviève Vaury
- Music by: Armand Seggian; Roland Vincent
- Distributed by: Gaumont Distribution
- Release date: 1966
- Running time: 91 minutes
- Language: French

Judoka-Secret Agent (French: Le Judoka, Agent secret, Italian: Carnet per un morto) is a 1966 French-Italian Eurospy film written and directed by Pierre Zimmer. It is based on the short story Le Judoka dans le ville by Ernie Clark. It had a sequel in 1967, Casse-tête chinois pour le judoka, with a different cast except for Marilù Tolo returning in a different role.

On her last day of filming actress Patricia Viterbo accidentally backed her sports car into the Seine during a scene and drowned as she was unable to swim. Her accompanying costar Henri Garcin escaped, but there are conflicting versions of whether he was at the wheel while they were returning from lunch.

== Plot ==
Marc is a French secret agent whose only weapons are judo and karate in this routine spy feature. With the help of his comedy-relief sidekick Jacques, the duo goes to protect a noted scientist from falling into the hands of a gang of underworld thugs. Marc finds love with one of the female gang members who turns out to be a double agent with the British Secret Service.

== Cast ==
- Jean-Claude Bercq as Marc Saint-Clair, aka The Judoka
- Marilù Tolo as Vanessa
- Perrette Pradier as Dominique Berg
- Patricia Viterbo as Catherine Demange
- Michael Lonsdale as Thomas Perkins
- Henri Garcin as Jacques Mercier
- Mick Besson as Oscar Meyer
- Fernand Berset as Commissioner Chaumont
- Yves Brainville as Paul Vincent
