= Petrovsky Island =

Island in Saint Petersburg, Russia

Petrovsky
Native name: Петровский остров
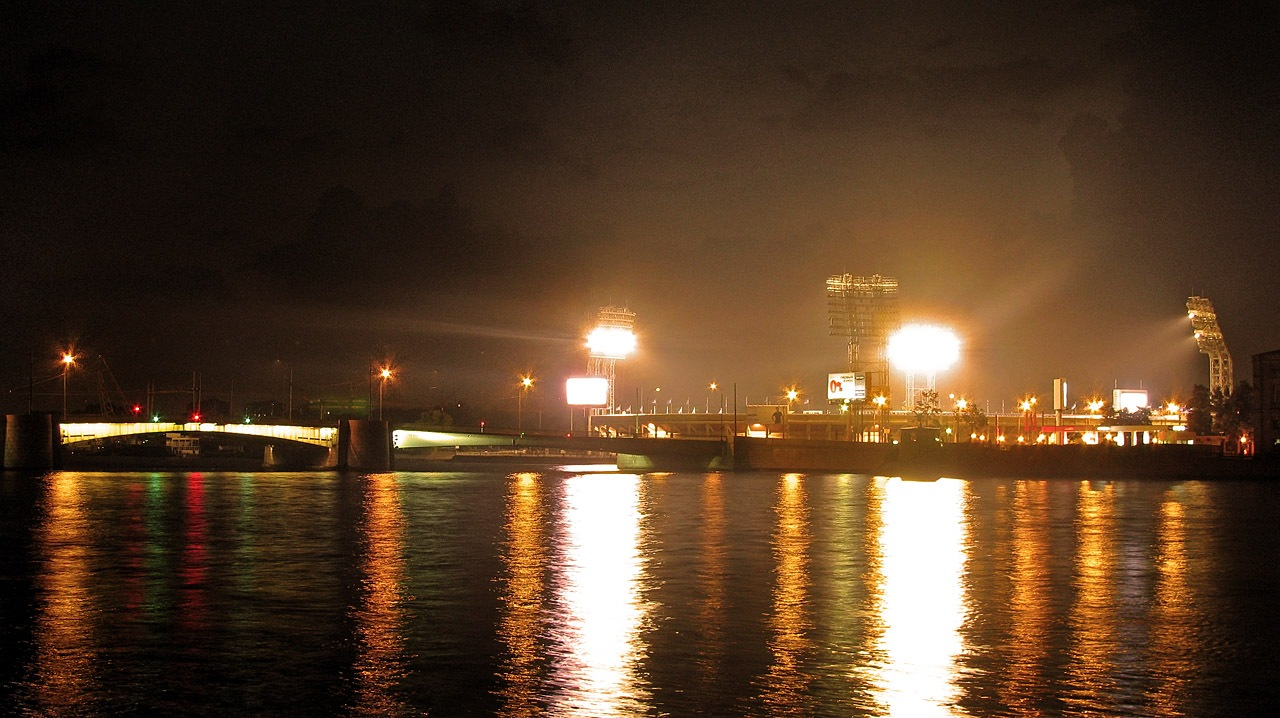
- View of the Petrovsky Island stadium and Tuchkov bridge
- Interactive map of Petrovsky

Geography
- Location: Neva Bay
- Coordinates: 59.959444°N 30.265556°E
- Area: 1.37 km^{2} (0.53 sq mi)
- Length: 3.3 km (2.05 mi)
- Width: 600 m (2000 ft)

Administration
- Russia
- City: Saint Petersburg

Petrovsky Island (Russian: Петро́вский о́стров) is an island in St. Petersburg, Russia, bordered by the Malaya Neva, Malaya Nevka, and Zhdanovka Rivers (in the delta of the Neva River).

== History ==
The island was called Stolbovy or Pattisaari in the early 18th century.

It belonged to Tsar Peter the Great in 1710 (hence the name) with two amusement houses built for him.

There were warehouses for foodstuff and other goods in the island in the 18th century.

In 1768, a wooden palace was erected for Catherine the Great and a Petrovsky Park set up around it in the southeast of the island, the palace burnt down in 1912 though.

The island was built up with industrial enterprises from the second half of the 19th century such as Novaya Bavaria Brewery, rope works, and curtain and lace manufacturing.

Lenin Stadium (today, Petrovsky Stadium) was erected in the southeastern extremity of the island in 1924–25.

St. Petersburg River Yacht Club, established in 1860, is situated in the western spit of the island.

Petrovsky Avenue is the main road.

The island is linked to Krestovsky Island via Bolshoy Petrovsky Bridge, Dekabristov Island via Betancourt Bridge and Petrogradsky Island via Maly Petrovsky Bridge. The other bridges are foot bridges thrown over the Zhdanovka.
