= One Hundred and One Nights =

1995 film by Agnès Varda

- Theatrical release poster
- French: Les cent et une nuits de Simon Cinéma
- Directed by: Agnès Varda
- Written by: Agnès Varda
- Produced by: Dominique Vignet
- Starring: Michel Piccoli; Marcello Mastroianni; Henri Garcin; Julie Gayet; Mathieu Demy; Emmanuel Salinger
- Cinematography: Eric Gautier
- Edited by: Hugues Darmois
- Production companies: Ciné-Tamaris; France 3 Cinéma; Recorded Picture Company
- Distributed by: 20th Century Fox
- Release date: 25 January 1995 (France)
- Running time: 101 minutes
- Countries: France; United Kingdom
- Language: French
- Box office: $294,900; 49,150 admissions (France)

One Hundred and One Nights (French: Les cent et une nuits de Simon Cinéma) is a 1995 comedy film written and directed by Agnès Varda. A light-hearted look at 100 years of commercial cinema, it celebrates in vision and sound favourite films from France, Germany, Italy, Japan, and the United States. It was entered into the 45th Berlin International Film Festival.

== Plot ==
Camille Miralis, a young film student, accepts an offer to visit a man approaching his 100th birthday, the wheelchair-using Simon Cinéma. Cinéma is a former actor, producer, and director whose memory is failing. He has hired Camille to come to his isolated château just outside Paris every night for 101 days to discuss cinema. Cinéma is attended to by his majordomo, Firmin. Camille soon finds that his head is "full of stars", and he frequently has delusions mistaking himself for other people. Meanwhile, her boyfriend, an aspiring filmmaker also named Camille—or "Mica", to distinguish the two—has a job on a film set, acting as an assistant to lead actress Fanny Ardant.

Marcello Mastroianni, an Italian friend of Cinéma's, comes to visit him, and is slightly perturbed by his delusions. Camille tells Marcello that she is writing her thesis on him. The following day, Camille learns of Cinéma's great-grandson, Vincent, from the château's groundskeeper. Camille asks Firmin about Vincent who responds that he has never met him. The next day, Firmin forbids Camille from entering Cinéma's room as he is entertaining a drunk visitor, later revealed to be Gérard Depardieu. She then learns that Vincent, the only living heir to Cinéma's massive fortune, has not been seen in ten years. Camille and Mica hatch a plan to hire an actor to pose as Vincent in order to gain access to the delusional Cinéma's inheritance and use it to fund Mica's short film.

Marcello returns to the château while Camille finds out more about Vincent from the groundskeeper. Cinéma's two ex-wives, Jeanne Moreau and Hanna Schygulla, come to visit him together. He likens them to the Fates, to which they reply that the third will soon come. Later, a vagabond arrives at the château asking Cinéma for food. Cinéma imagines her as a princess, then as a knight. A maid reveals that it was Sandrine Bonnaire. Mica meets with his friend's brother who has just returned from India, also named Vincent. Camille recounts seeing Anouk Aimée and Marcello at the château to Mica, but that she missed Depardieu. Mica asks to meet Cinéma; Camille declines but starts making Cinéma think of Vincent's potential return. She asks Mica's friend's brother Vincent to impersonate Cinéma's great-grandson Vincent in their scheme for a third of the inheritance.

Vincent arrives at the château posing as Vincent Cinéma, tricking the groundskeeper by mentioning details of his childhood obtained from Camille. Simon is overjoyed at Vincent's return and introduces him to Camille, who feigns ignorance. The next day, Alain Delon comes to visit the château, but is turned away by Firmin as only Vincent is allowed to see the ailing Cinéma. However, after Delon leaves, a group of Japanese tourists arrive to visit the château and Cinéma. Mica is among the Japanese and agitates Cinéma greatly, angering Camille. Nevertheless, Camille asks Cinéma to appear in Mica's film. He agrees, and in exchange, she must host his garden party. An entertainer named Marina, whom many guests initially mistake for Elizabeth Taylor, attends the party, causing Cinéma to believe it is actually her. She foils Camille, Mica and Vincent's plan by having him sign his entire fortune over to her. Vincent is pleased as he has become fond of Cinéma.

As Cinéma's mental state deteriorates further, he imagines himself and Camille attending the Cannes Film Festival together, and hallucinates Catherine Deneuve boating in his lake with Robert De Niro, whom he later imagines shooting in the head. Camille takes him to Mica's film set, where Cinéma faints upon watching a woman perform a striptease and demands that Camille and Vincent take him to Hollywood. While Cinéma meets Harrison Ford, Camille and Vincent kiss. Upon her return, Mica tells Camille that he wants her back. Cinéma's fate is left unknown; in a voice-over, he declares, "I'm glad to not be with them. I'm like Buñuel. Down with commemorations. Long live anarchy. Down with speeches. Long live desire." (Note: French: "Je suis content de pas être avec eux. Moi, je suis comme Buñuel. À bas les commémorations. Vive l'anarchie. À bas les discours. Vive le désir.") Some time later, Marcello takes several items from the empty château.

== Cast ==
- Michel Piccoli as Simon Cinéma
- Marcello Mastroianni as himself
- Henri Garcin as Firmin Gauche
- Julie Gayet as Camille Miralis
- Mathieu Demy as Camille "Mica"
- Emmanuel Salinger as Vincent
- Anouk Aimée as herself
- Fanny Ardant as herself
- Jean-Paul Belmondo as Professor Bébel
- Romane Bohringer as the young lady in purple
- Sandrine Bonnaire as the vagabond
- Jean-Claude Brialy as the tour guide of the Japanese
- Patrick Bruel as the primary speaker
- Alain Delon as himself
- Catherine Deneuve as herself
- Robert De Niro as himself
- Gérard Depardieu as himself
- Harrison Ford as himself
- Gina Lollobrigida as herself
- Jeanne Moreau as herself
- Hanna Schygulla as herself
- Sabine Azéma as herself
- Jane Birkin as garden party guest
- Stephen Dorff as the mute Hollywood actor
- Andréa Ferréol as the astonished
- Assumpta Serna as the mute Hollywood actress
- Daniel Toscan du Plantier as the secondary speaker
- Isabelle Adjani as herself
- Jean-Hugues Anglade as himself
- Daniel Auteuil as himself
- Clint Eastwood as himself
- Virna Lisi as herself
- Marina Castelnuovo as herself (Elizabeth Taylor lookalike)
- Francisco Rabal as the voice of Buñuel
- Arielle Dombasle as the singer at the garden party (uncredited)

== Reception ==
Janet Maslin wrote a favorable review in The New York Times published on 16 April 1999: "Catherine Deneuve, Alain Delon, Robert De Niro and Gerard Depardieu all make brief guest appearances in Agnes Varda's 1995 film.... And those are just the Ds. For this delirious birthday party in honor of filmmaking's first century, Ms. Varda has made every grand allusion she can manage and drawn upon every droppable name and celebrity connection. She creates a whirl of film's greatest hits, an overripe variety show that plays like the ultimate round of Trivial Pursuit....What makes her film as engaging as it is excessive is the obvious affection with which Ms. Varda has collected these memories. The vast array of film clips that surface here have been chosen for their quirkiness or emotional impact rather than for academic reasons. And the loose talk that links otherwise unrelated sequences tends to be playful, despite the ample opportunities for pomposity that this format provides."

Variety's Lisa Nesselson gave a mixed review: "Agnes Varda, who has been making movies for 40 of the 100 years that motion pictures have existed, has put everything she knows about filmmaking and much of what she loves about the cinema into A Hundred and One Nights [sic]. But despite a star-decked cast and manifest good intentions, Varda's self-described 'divertimento' soars in only a few spots."
