= Perrette Pradier =

French actress (1938–2013)

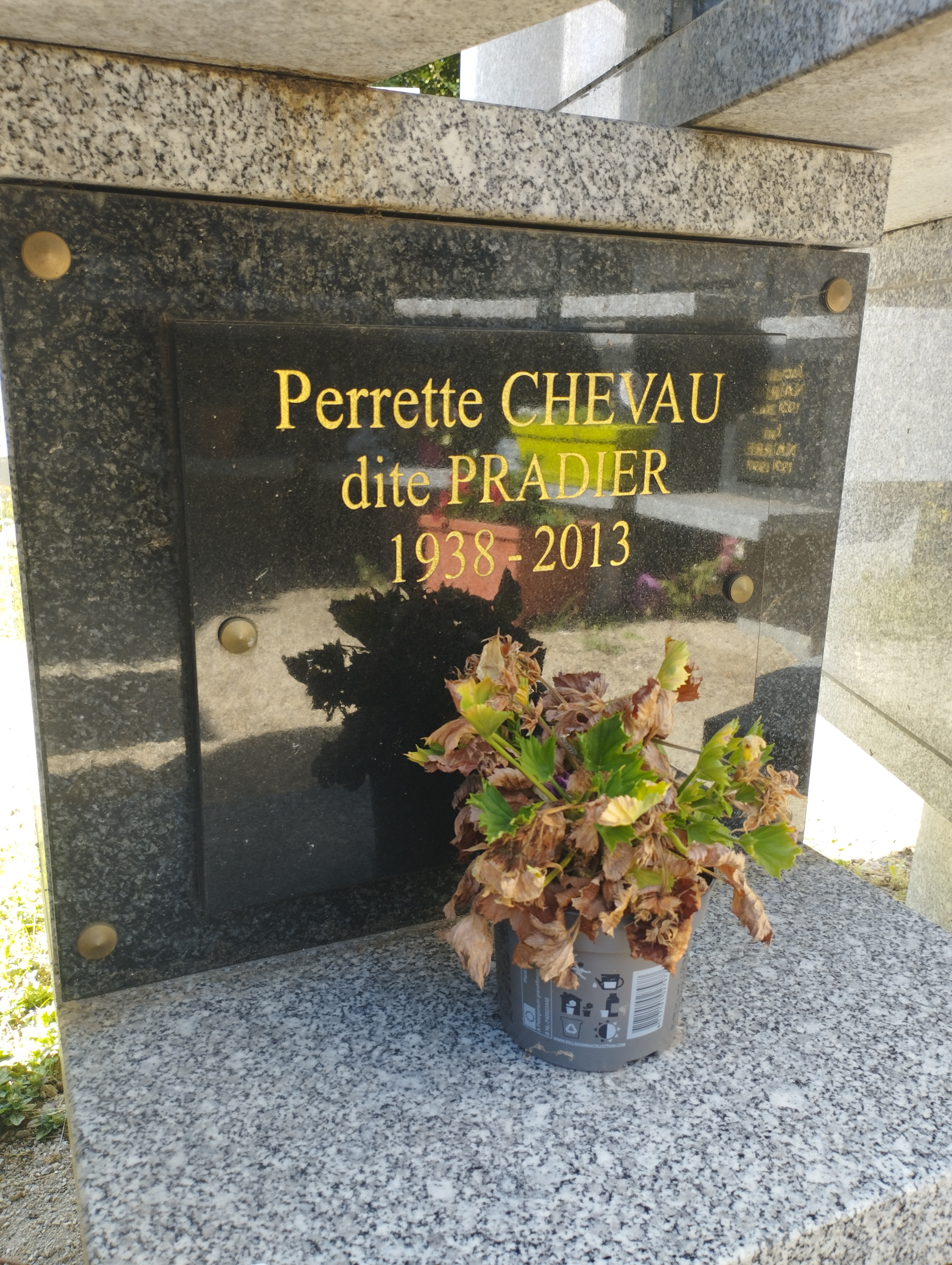
- Born: Perrette Marie Mathilde Chevau; April 17, 1938; Hanoi, French Indochina
- Died: January 16, 2013 (aged 74); Rueil-Malmaison, France
- Occupations: Actress; art director
- Years active: 1961-2013
- Children: Vanina Pradier

Perrette Pradier (born Perrette Marie Mathilde Chevau; 17 April 1938 – 16 January 2013) was a French actress and dubbing director. She is best known for her work as a voice actress which earned her the nickname of "Queen" or "High Priestess" of dubbing.

== Biography ==
Pradier was born in Hanoi, French Indochina. Two years after making her film début, in 1961, she was awarded the Prix Suzanne Bianchetti as most promising new actress in France for her performance as "Amenita" in the Sacha Guitry film, "Stop Thief." That year she gained further recognition for her role as "Constance Bonacieux" in two films based on the Three Musketeers. Throughout the 1960s, she appeared in a number of films in her native France, then was contracted for Hollywood productions that included the Fred Zinnemann film Behold a Pale Horse (1964) starring luminaries Gregory Peck, Anthony Quinn, and Omar Sharif. She returned to English-language filming in the Universal Studios thriller, House of Cards (1968) with Orson Welles and George Peppard.

In her long career, Perrette Pradier has also worked in live theatre, appearing in plays such as La Bonne Addresse as well as the longest running French play ever produced, Boeing Boeing. In 1994, she was the voice of "Sarafina" in the French version of the Walt Disney Studios animated feature film, The Lion King.

== Death ==
Pradier died of a heart attack on 16 January 2013, aged 74, in Rueil-Malmaison, France, a month after being operated for an aneurysm.

== Filmography ==
- Le Roi Lion (The Lion King) (1994) (voice)
- Le Big Bang (1987) (voice)
- Fiével et le nouveau monde (An American tail) (1986)
- Les Dalton en cavale (1983) (voice)
- Comme une femme (1980)
- Le Comédien (1976) (TV)
- Le Temps de vivre, le temps d'aimer (1973) TV Miniseries
- Céleste (1970)
- House of Cards (1968)
- Au théâtre ce soir: Boléro (1968) (TV)
- Le Judoka, agent secret (Judoka-Secret Agent) (1966)
- L' Homme d'Istamboul (That Man in Istanbul) (1965)
- L' Amour à la chaine (Tight Skirts, Loose Pleasures) (1965)
- Furia à Bahia pour OSS 117 (OSS 117: Mission for a Killer) (1965)
- Behold a Pale Horse (1964)
- Des frissons partout (Jeff Gordon, Secret Agent) (1963)
- Blague dans le coin (1963)
- Les Saintes nitouches (Wild Living) (1962)
- Le Crime ne paie pas (Crime Does Not Pay) (1962)
- The Burning Court (La chambre ardente) (1962)
- Les Sept péchés capitaux (The Seven Deadly Sins) (1962)
- Les Amours de Paris (Paris Loves) (1961)
- Le Jeu de la vérité (The Game of Truth) (1961)
- The Three Musketeers (1961)
- The Nabob Affair (1960)
- La Brune que voilà (There Is the Brunette) (1960)
- Les Scélérats (The Wretches) (1959)
