= Lutz Büscher =

German film director and screenwriter

- Born: October 24, 1937; Berlin
- Died: March 23, 2007 (aged 69)
- Resting place: Volksdorf Cemetery, Hamburg
- Citizenship: German
- Occupations: Film director and screenwriter
- Years active: 1966-1994
- Notable work: Tatort
- Spouse: Barbara Büscher
- Partner: Murkel

Lutz Büscher (October 24, 1937 - March 23, 2007) was a German film director and screenwriter who helped create episodes for Großstadtrevier, Peter Strohm, and Titanic - Nachspiel einer Katastrophe, as well as his own series, Tatort.

== Life and career ==
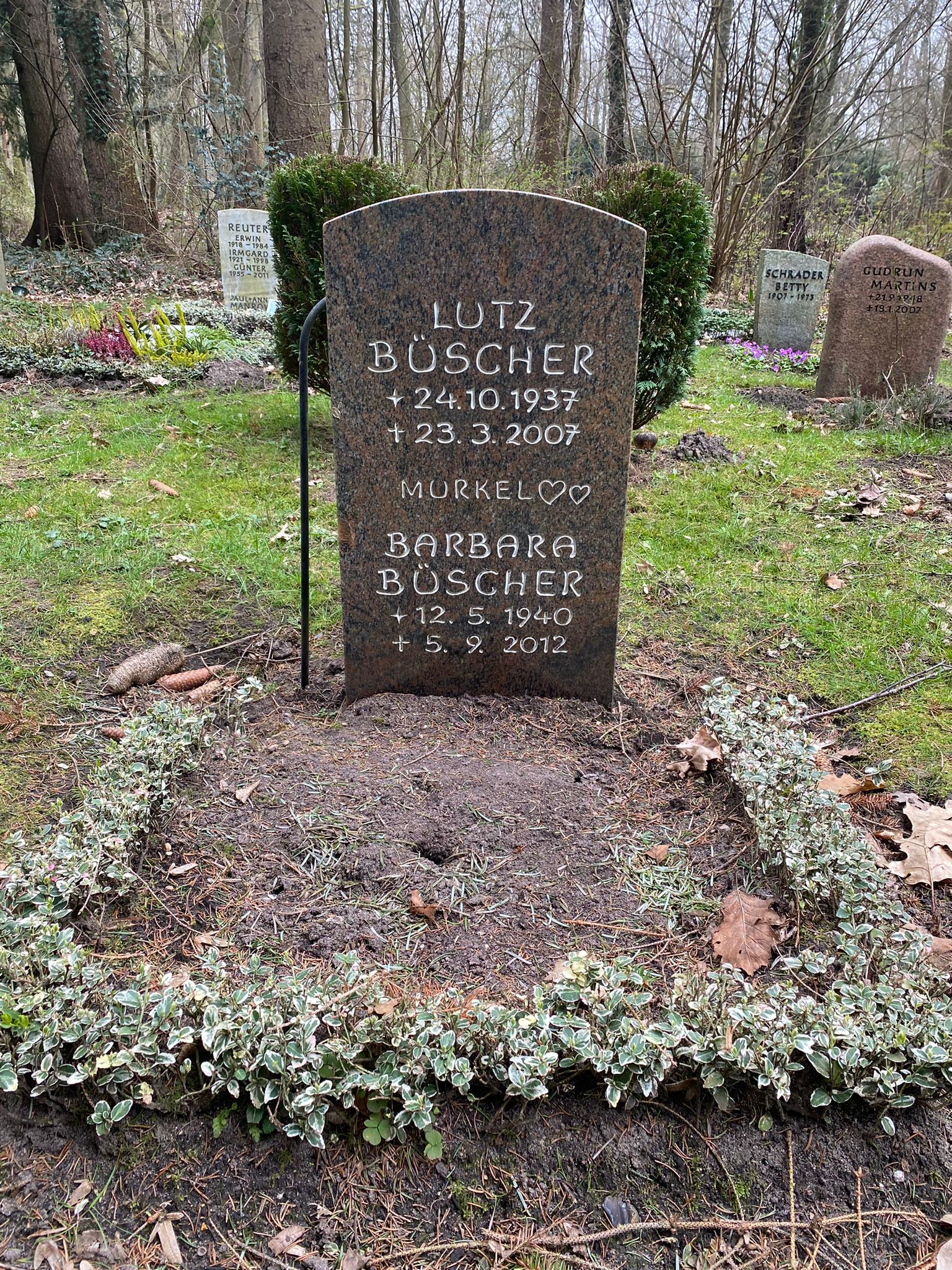
Büscher's grave in Hamburg

Büscher was born in Berlin, German Reich, on October 24, 1937. His television career began in 1966 as a junior assistant director for the film Porträt eines Helden, under the Austrian director Michael Kehlmann.

Büscher's first film came in 1967, when he directed the crime film Der Alte, starring Paul Verhoeven, Ursula Jockkeit, and Hans Dickow. Büscher wrote the film's script himself.

Büscher made over 20 television films and series over the course of his 27-year career.

Büscher died on March 23, 2007, at the age of 69. He was buried in the Volksdorf cemetery in Hamburg.

== Films ==
In total, Büscher directed a total of 26 films and co-directed one.

=== Director ===
- 1967: Die Alt (TV Film)
- 1968: Auch schon im alten Rom (TV Film)
- 1968: Die Entwaffnung (TV Film)
- 1969: Jean der Träumer (TV Film)
- 1969-1970: Die Perle – Aus dem Tagebuch einer Hausgehilfin (TV Series)
- 1970: Abseits (TV Film)
- 1970: Abiturienten (TV Film)
- 1974: Maß für Maß (TV Film)
- 1975: Armer Richard (TV Film)
- 1975: Hahnenkampf (TV Film)
- 1976: Das Fräulein von Scuderi (TV Film)
- 1976: Den lieben langen Tag (TV Series, 1 Episode)
- 1977: Tatort – Das Mädchen am Klavier
- 1978: Ein Mord am Lietzensee (TV Film)
- 1980: Kein Geld für einen Toten (TV Film)
- 1981: Die Baronin – Fontane machte sie unsterblich (TV Film)
- 1982: Sonderdezernat K1 (TV Series, 1 Episode)
- 1983: Tatort – Roulette mit 6 Kugeln
- 1984: Titanic - Nachspiel einer Katastrophe (TV Film)
- 1985: Zwischen den Zeiten (TV Film)
- 1985–1987: Ein Fall für TKKG (TV Series, 12 Episoden)
- 1986: Die Stunde des Léon Bisquet (TV Film)
- 1987: Sturmflut (TV Film)
- 1989–1991: Peter Strohm (TV Series, 2 Episoden)
- 1991: Großstadtrevier (TV Series, 1 Episode)
- 1994: Lutz & Hardy (TV Series, 1 Episode)

=== Assistant Director ===
- 1967: Der Alte (TV Film)

=== Junior Assistant Director ===
- 1966: Porträt eines Helden (TV Film)
