= Petrovsky Stadium =

Football stadium in Saint Petersburg, Russia

Coordinates: 59°57′07″N 30°17′11″E

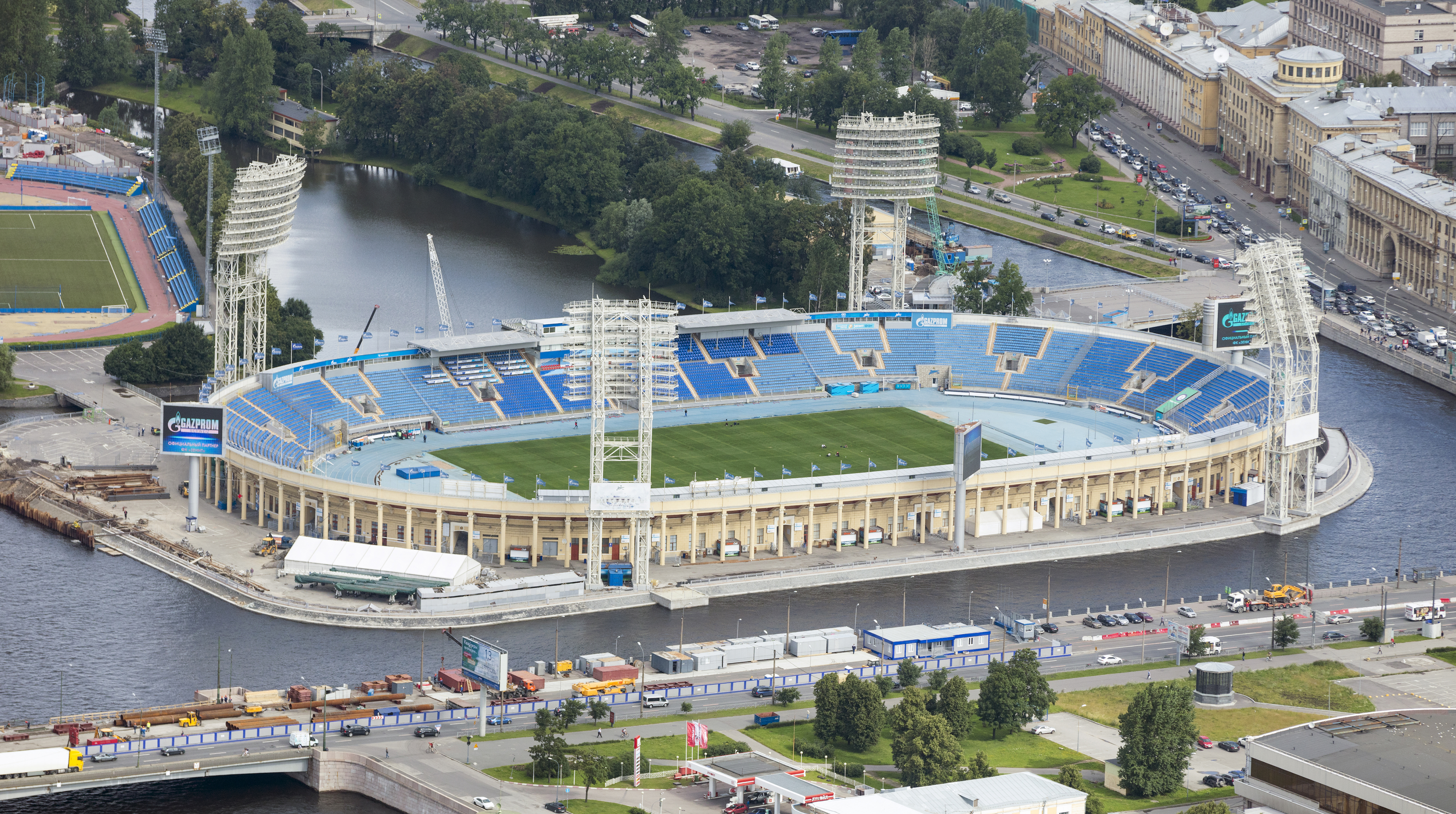
- Aerial view of Petrovsky Stadium in 2016
- Interactive map of Petrovsky Stadium
- Former names: Lenin Stadium (1925–1992)
- Location: Saint Petersburg, Russia
- Operator: Administration of Saint Petersburg
- Capacity: 20 985 (2022-)
- Surface: Grass
- Field size: 105 m × 68 m (344 ft × 223 ft)

Construction
- Groundbreaking: May 1924
- Built: 1924–1925
- Opened: 26 July 1925; 101 years ago
- Renovated: 1933, 1961, 1978, 1994, 2010

Tenants
- Zenit Saint Petersburg (1994–2017); Tosno (2017–2018); Leningradets Leningrad Oblast (2021–2023)

The Petrovsky Stadium (Russian: стадион «Петровский») is part of a sports complex that consists of a number of buildings, with the stadium being used mostly for football and sometimes athletics. The Grand Sport Arena of the Petrovsky Sport Complex was the home of Zenit Saint Petersburg until 2017 and Tosno in 2017–2018.

The complex also contains another football stadium, Minor Sport Arena (MSA). MSA of Petrovsky, as of 2022, was used by several teams that compete in lower professional leagues: Dynamo Saint Petersburg and Zenit-2 Saint Petersburg (selected matches). The capacity of MSA is 2835. The whole complex is located in the Petrograd region of central St. Petersburg on Petrovsky Island – an island in the Malaya Neva River connected to the adjacent Petrogradsky islands through Zhdanovsky bridge. The nearest metro station Sportivnaya is around 150 metres (490 ft) away from the stadium.

== Capacity ==
The Grand Sport Arena of the Petrovsky Sport Complex has a capacity of 20,985 people.

== History ==
The first stadium at this location was designed by Czech architect Aloise Wejwoda and was built in 1924–1925. During World War II, the stadium was completely destroyed. In 1957–1961, it was rebuilt by architects N.V. Baranov, O.I. Guryev and V.M. Fromzel. At that time the capacity was 33,000 seats. Before the 1980 Summer Olympics, the Petrovsky Stadium went through the reconstruction.

Zenit Saint Petersburg was based at the Petrovsky Stadium from 1994 to 2017. Tosno used the Petrovsky Stadium for one season.

== Photo gallery ==
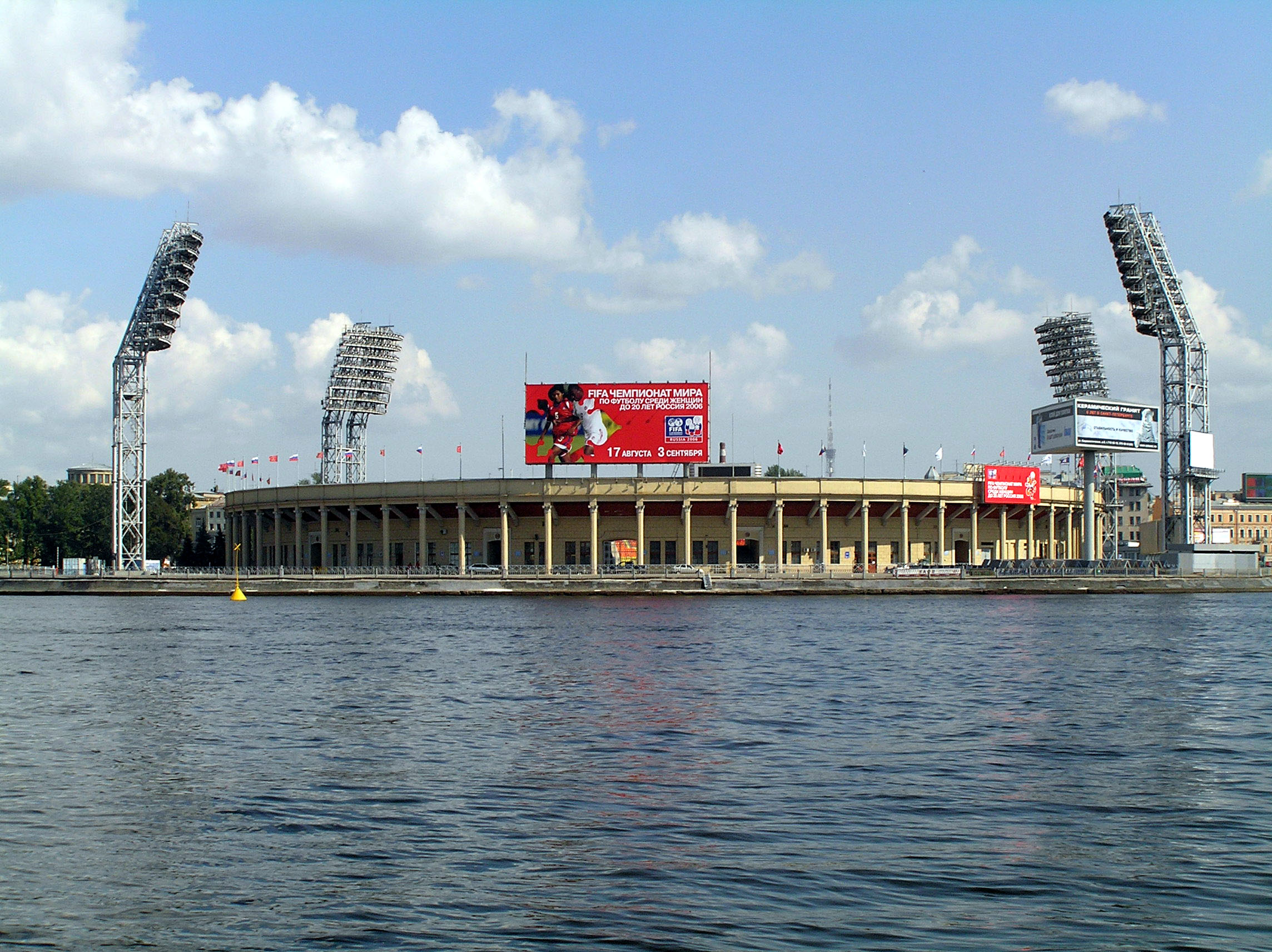
Facade of the stadium

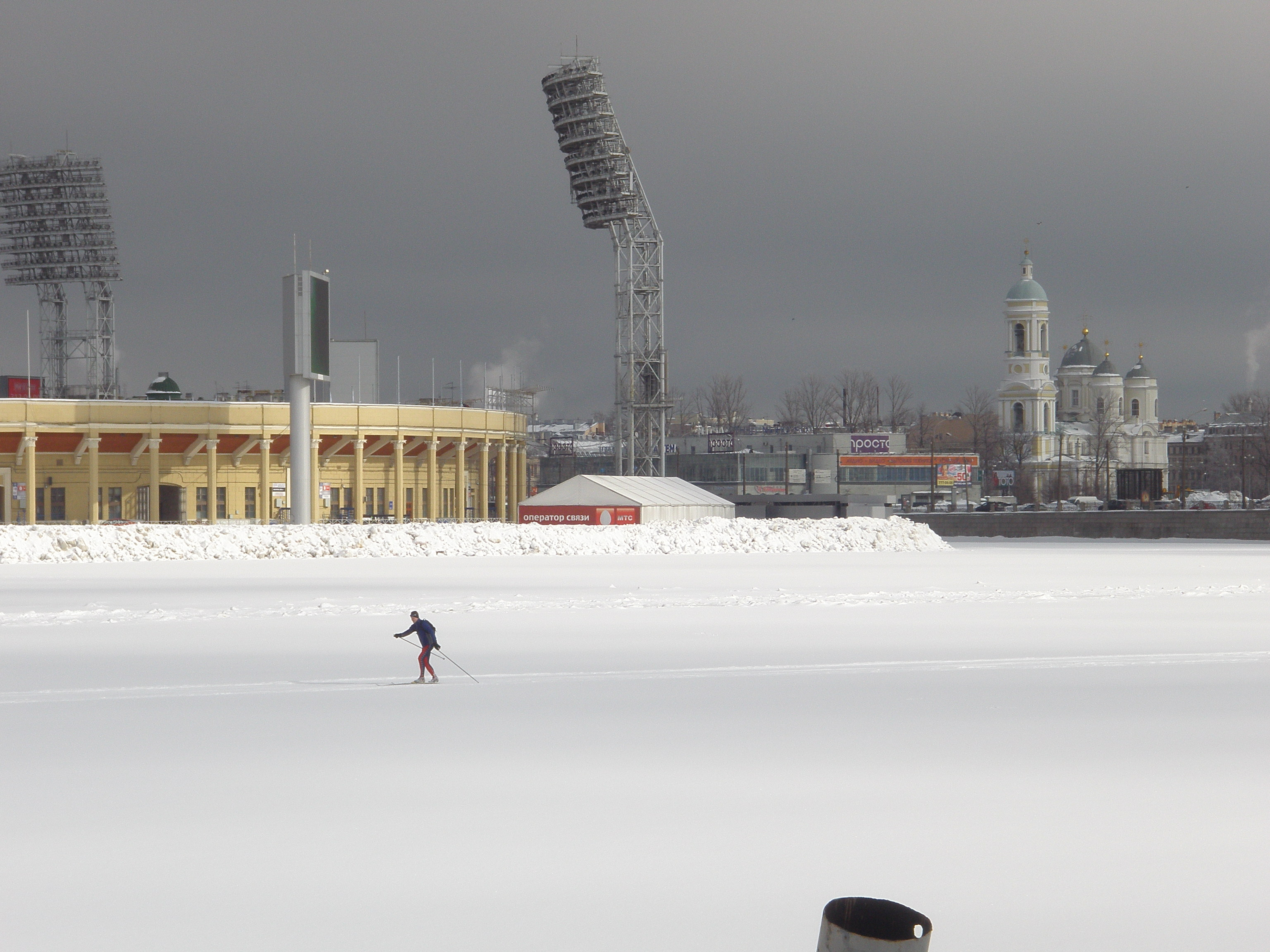
Facade of the stadium in winter and a view of St. Vladimir's Cathedral

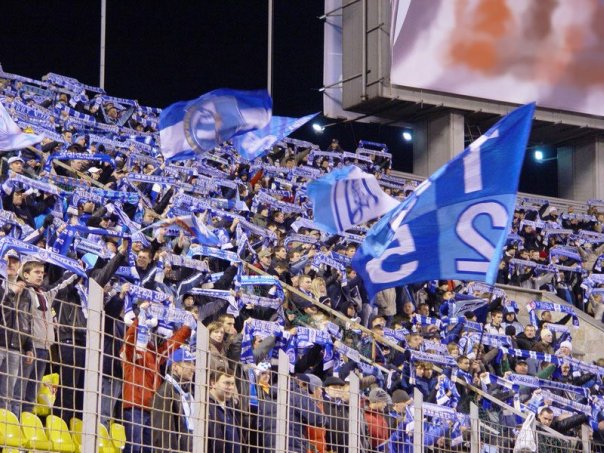
FC Zenit fans at the stadium in 2008

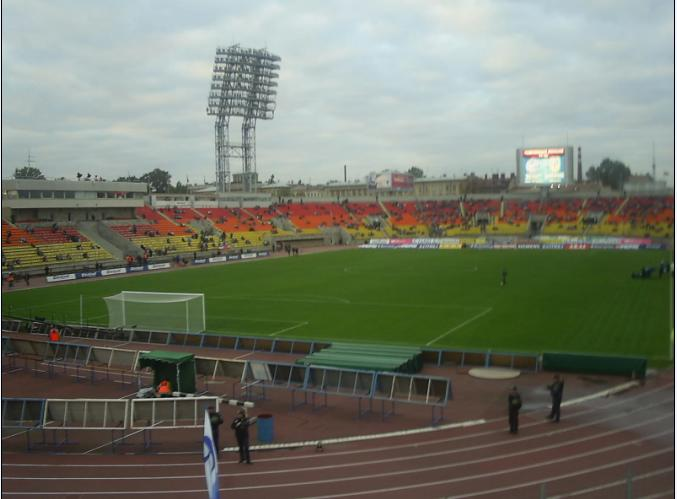
Petrovsky Stadium in 2005
