= Liberté I =

1962 film

- Film poster
- Directed by: Yves Ciampi
- Written by: Yves Ciampi
- Starring: Hassane Fall
- Cinematography: Emile Vilerbue
- Edited by: Georges Alépée
- Music by: Gana M'Bow; Colette Mansart
- Release date: 1962
- Running time: 90 minutes
- Countries: France; Senegal
- Language: French

Liberté I is a 1962 French-Senegalese film directed by Yves Ciampi. It was entered into the 1962 Cannes Film Festival.

== Plot ==
A Senegalese midwife and her husband, who is a politician, are torn between modernity and tradition after their homeland becomes independent.

== Cast ==
- Hassane Fall as Abdoulaye
- Corinne Marchand as Anne
- Maurice Ronet as Michel
- Nanette Senghor as Aminata
