= Little Neva =

River in Russia

Coordinates: 59°58′N 30°14′E

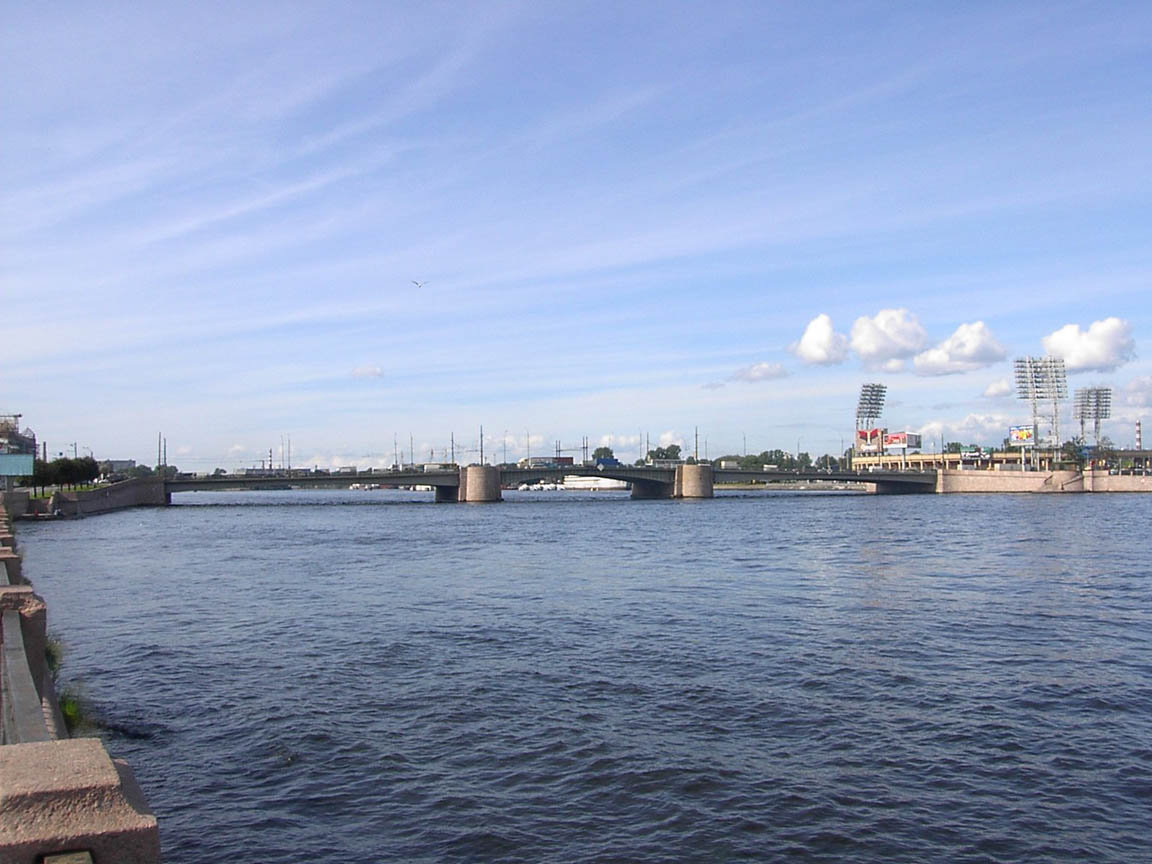
Tuchkov Bridge over the Little Neva

The Little Neva or Malaya Neva (Russian: Ма́лая Нева́) is the second largest distributary of the river Neva. The Neva splits into Great Neva (the southern armlet) and Little Neva (the northern armlet) near the Spit of Vasilievsky Island (easternmost tip of the island), in the historic centre of the city of Saint Petersburg.

The Little Neva is 4.25 kilometres (2.64 mi) long; the width is from 200 to 400 metres (660 to 1,310 ft), and the depth is 3 to 7 metres (10 to 23 ft). It has its own armlets: Smolenka and Zhdanovka. There are three bridges across Little Neva: Exchange Bridge, Tuchkov Bridge and Betancourt Bridge.

== See also ==
- List of bridges in Saint Petersburg
