= Henri Garcin =

Dutch actor (1928–2022)

- Garcin in 1988
- Born: 11 April 1928; Antwerp, Belgium
- Died: 13 June 2022 (aged 94); Paris, France
- Occupation: Actor
- Years active: 1956–2022

Henri Garcin (born Anton Albers; 11 April 1928 – 13 June 2022) was a Belgian film actor. He appeared in more than 100 films from 1956 to 2022.

== Selected filmography ==
- Mademoiselle and Her Gang (1957)
- Arsène Lupin Versus Arsène Lupin (1962)
- Mata Hari, Agent H21 (1964)
- A Matter of Resistance (1965)
- Judoka-Secret Agent (1966)
- Les Gauloises bleues (1968)
- The Cop (1970)
- Someone Behind the Door (1971)
- Les Guichets du Louvre (1974)
- Verdict (1974)
- Love at the Top (1974)
- The Common Man (1975)
- The More It Goes, the Less It Goes (1977)
- An Almost Perfect Affair (1979)
- La Femme flic (1980)
- The Woman Next Door (1981)
- A Hundred and One Nights (1995)
- The Eighth Day (1996)
- The Proprietor (1996)
- The Dress (1996)
- The Pink Panther (2006)
- My Best Friend (2006)
- Schneider vs. Bax (2015)
- Tonio (2016)
