= André Libik =

Hungarian film director, producer and writer (1932–2025)

André Libik (25 February 1932 - 22 November 2025) was a film producer, director and writer born in Budapest, Hungary. After World War 2 his father Albert Libik, who was an influential businessman in Budapest, sent him to an elite boarding school located in Switzerland. Returning to Budapest, first he studied chemistry upon the wish of his father and older brother George Libik, but later enrolled in the Hungarian Film School. He left Hungary in 1956, after the Hungarian Revolution. He settled in Paris with his wife and two daughters Anne-Solange Libik & Zsuzsanna Judit Libik as a refugee. There he directed his first films for the French Red Cross, unpaid. After his successful application as Head of the Film Division in the Nigerian Ministry of Information, he lived in Africa for three years and produced films, one of which won the Silver Bear Award at the Berlin Film Festival. In 1963, he moved to Germany and worked for television, established his own film production company, creating many documentaries, TV and feature films. He was awarded the “Grimme-Preis”, the top German TV award. In 1992, he settled in Hungary again, continued to produce films and won the “Golden Butterfly Award”.

== Biography ==
André Libik attended elementary school in Budapest, secondary schools in Budapest, Sárospatak (Hungary) and later in Zugerberg (Switzerland). In 1951 and 1952, he was a student of the Hungarian Film School, which he had to leave for political reasons. From 1952 to 1956, he translated works by Jean Anouilh, Georges Sadoul and Béla Balázs into Hungarian. In 1956, he participated in the Hungarian Uprising and had to leave the country with his family. He later then established himself in Paris.

From 1957 to 1960, André Libik wrote and directed three short films financed by the French Red Cross: Un Homme dans l'Inhumanité (about Imre Nagy), Sans Passeport and Terre Retrouvée (both about refugees). In 1960-62, he was Head of the Film Division, Ministry of Information, Nigeria. He wrote, directed and produced a newsreel, and various documentaries there.

In 1962, as head of the Nigerian delegation to the Berlin Film Festival, he won the "Silver Bear Award" for "The Ancestors", a documentary film written, directed and produced by him. He settled in West Berlin and from 1962 to 1972, he wrote, directed and produced numerous TV films for German, French and US television (see filmography).

He settled in Munich 1972, became a German citizen, and created his own production company "André Libik Filmproduktion" in Munich and Berlin. From 1972 to 1992, he wrote, directed and/or produced many films for German TV, became a specialist for international co-productions. André Libik won various international and German TV awards, is also a founding member of the German Association of Film and TV Producers and member of the German Union of Film Directors. In 1992, he resettled in Hungary and resumed Hungarian citizenship. He continued to produce films, but also represented German companies and became one of the initiators and managers of the "ALFA TV" project.

In 1994, he was the first Hungarian to receive the "European Order of Merit" in the European Parliament in Brussels. In 1996, he became Knight of the Sovereign Order of St. John of Jerusalem, Knights of Malta and representative of the "European Order of Merit" in Hungary. As a member of the European Film Academy, he also received the “Golden Butterfly Prize" of the Hungarian Ministry of Culture.

Between the years 1997 and 2000, he was Director for International Affairs of the United Nations European Economic Commission’s Regional Centre in Budapest. In 1998, he became Knight Commander of the Sovereign Order of St. John of Jerusalem, Knights of Malta. From 1999 to 2001, he was Line Producer of various major German TV productions and in 2000 he published his autobiography “Pretty Girls and Terrorists”, which received considerable critical acclaim.

From 2002 to 2006, he was the Director for International Affairs of the Central and East European Institute for Environmental Development. In 2006, the second edition of “Pretty Girls and Terrorists” was published. In 2007, he became Director for International Affairs of the Széchenyi Scientific Society and between 2008 and 2010, he was Secretary General of this Society.

== Filmography ==
=== Writer and director ===
- 1958: Un homme dans l’inhumanité ("A Man in Inhumanity”) - Short documentary about Hungarian Premier Imre Nagy. Co-written and co-directed with cinematographer Jean Badal
- 1959, Paris: Sans passeport ("Without a Passport”) - Short documentary about refugees in Paris. Produced by the French Red Cross.
- 1959, Paris: Terre retrouvée ("Refound Earth”) - Short documentary about refugees resettling in Southern France. Produced by the French Red Cross.
- 1961, Nigeria: Sunrise in the East- Documentary about Eastern Nigeria. Grand Prix - Mogadishu African Film Festival, 2nd Prize with Silver Plaque at International Exhibition, Rome, 1962
- 1962, Nigeria: The Ancestors - Documentary about ancestral worship in Nigeria. Silver Bear - Berlin Film Festival.
- 1963: Alte Leute heute ("Old People Today”)

Schmuck aus Neu-Gablonz ("Jewelry from New Gablonz”)
Nürnberger Tand geht durch alle Land ("Playthings from Nuremberg”)
Three short documentaries - German Federal Press Office.

- 1964: Auf der Suche nach dem Heil ("Search for Salvation”) - Documentary about religious sects. (ARD - German TV)
- 1964: Die Grenzen der Vernunft ("Frontiers of the Mind") - Documentary about parapsychology. Over 18.000 letters from viewers. (ARD - German TV)
- 1964-68: Der politische Mord ("Political Assassination”) Documentary TV series:

Jean Jaurès, Tod eines Visionärs ("Death of a Visionary") Honorary Mention, "Grimme Award" (Top German TV Award)
Trotsky, Tod eines Propheten ("Trotsky, Death of a Prophet") "Grimme Award"
Gandhi, Apostel der Gewaltlosigkeit ("Gandhi, Apostle of Non-Violence")
Mord in Marseille ("Murder in Marseille") (Assassination of Yugoslav King Alexander I and French Foreign Minister Barthou, 1934)
Malcolm X (Assassination of famous Black Liberation leader in New York)
Ein General muss sterben ("A General Must Die”) Assassination of Portuguese General Humberto Delgado

- 1967: Die künstlichen Paradiese ("Artificial Paradise”) - First German documentary about drug abuse. (ARD - German TV)
- 1968: Grossmacht Erdöl ("The Power of Oil”) - Documentary about the international oil companies. (ARD - German TV)
- 1968: Kinder auf der Folter ("Children Under Torture”). Documentary about child beating. (ARD - German TV)
- 1969: Uran, Schlüssel zur Weltmacht ("The Key to World Power”) - Documentary about atomic energy, with General Groves, head of the "Manhattan Project”. (ARD - German TV)
- 1969: Ich bin ein Söldner ("I am a Mercenary”) - Documentary about mercenaries in the Congo. (ARD - German TV)
- 1970: Theatrum sacrum - Documentary about scenic art in Bavarian and Austrian churches (BR – Bavarian TV)
- 1970: Weltmacht aus der Retorte ("The Story of IG Farben") - Documentary about the infamous German manufacturer of Cyclone B gas. (BR – Bavarian TV)
- 1970: Fünf Finger sind eine Faust ("Five Fingers Make a Fist”) - Documentary about the New Left in Germany. (ARD - German TV)
- 1971: Wer nicht schweigt, muss sterben ("He Who Speaks Must Die”) - Documentary about the Sicilian Mafia. (ARD - German TV)
- 1972: Leben in Beton ("Living in Concrete") - Documentary about people living in social projects (ARD - German TV)
- 1972: Einige Tage im Leben des Dr. Spirgi ("A Few Days in the Life of Dr. Spirgi") Documentary about a delegate of the International Red Cross). (ARD - German TV)
- 1973: Einmal Urwald und zurück("Return Ticket to the Jungle") Documentary about an "Adventure Holiday" (ARD - German TV)
- 1984: Raketen abgeschossen, Ziel vernichtet ("Rockets Fired, Target Destroyed”) - Documentary about the shoot-down of a Korean airliner by the Soviets - Nominated for "Grimme Award". (ARD - German TV)
- 1986: Zwölf Tage zwischen Angst und Hoffnung ("Twelve Days Between Fear And Hope”) - Documentary about the Hungarian Revolution 1956 - "Film of the Year" by German TV Critics. (ZDF - German TV)

=== Director ===
- 1955: Az útkarbantartás korszerűsítése ("Modernization of Road Maintenance") (Industrial film for the Hungarian Ministry of Transport)
- 1974: Hafen am Rhein ("Port on the Rhine") Pilot film for a TV drama series (ARD - German TV)

=== Writer and producer ===
- 1975: Im Zweifel gegen den Angeklagten ("In Doubt Against the Defendant”) - TV documentary drama about a criminal case in West Berlin 1950. (ZDF - German TV)

=== Writer, director and producer ===
- 1972: Potpourri von Ferenczy - A portrait of the famous German media tycoon. (ARD - German TV)
- 1972: Musste Tommy sterben? ("Did Tommy Have to Die?") - Documentary about a child killed by his parents. (BR - Bavarian TV)
- 1973: Grenzstation Krebsklinik ("Border Station Cancer Clinic”) - Documentary about a terminal cancer clinic. (ARD - German TV)
- 1973: Kaputt geht’s ganz bestimmt ("Planned Obsolescence”) - Documentary about consumer protection. (ARD - German TV)
- 1974: Dem Unheimlichen auf der Spur ("Investigating the Twilight”) - Four-part TV documentary series about Extrasensory Perception, Spiritualism et al. (ARD - German TV)
- 1975: Die jungen Löwen von Arabien ("The Young Lions of Arabia”) - Documentary about young managers in Kuwait. (ARD - German TV)
- 1979: Ein Mythos will nicht sterben ("A Myth That Will Not Die”) - Documentary about the French Foreign Legion. (German-French Co-production)
- 1980: Ein Volk im Exil ("No More Mountains”) - Documentary about the Hmong people in Laos. (German-US-French Co-production)
- 1987: Der Verführer – Joseph Goebbels ("The Seducer”) - Documentary about the Nazi Minister of Propaganda. (ZDF - German TV)

=== Producer ===
- 1958: Der Nürnberger Prozess ("The Nuremberg Trial") - Feature-length documentary about the Nazi War Criminals' Trial. (Production Manager - Continent Film, Munich)
- 1967: Search for Vengeance - Documentary about Nazi War Criminals. (Executive Producer - ABC, Wolper Productions USA)
- 1969: The Rise and Fall of the Third Reich - Four-part US TV documentary based on the famous book. (Associate Producer - ABC, Wolper Productions USA)
- 1975: Cafe Hungaria - 13-part drama series based on Hungarian short stories. (German-Hungarian Co-production)
- 1976: Jugend vor der Wahl ("Young People Elect") - Documentary about young people before elections. ARD-German TV
- 1976: Ein Sonntag im Oktober ("A Sunday in October”) - Feature film based on events in Hungary in October 1944. (German-Hungarian Co-production)
- 1978: Heinrich, der gute König ("Henri Quatre”) - 6-part drama series based on Heinrich Mann's famous novel. (German-French Co-production)
- 1980: Der Mann, der sich in Luft auflöste ("The Man Who Went Up in Smoke”) - Feature film based on the Sjöwall-Wahlöö novel. (German-Swedish-Hungarian Co-production)
- 1982: Albert Einstein - Four-part biographical drama miniseries. (International Co-production - Broadcast by the US Disney Channel)
- 1982: The Train Killer (“Viadukt”) - Feature film with Michael Sarrazin. (German-US-Hungarian Co-production)
- 1983: Zeugnis aus der grünen Hölle ("Letters From Green Hell”) - TV drama filmed in French Guiana. (German-French Co-production)
- 1983: Titanic - Nachspiel einer Katastrophe ("The Titanic Investigation”) - TV drama based on US Congressional Records. (ZDF - German TV)
- 1984: Flug in die Hölle ("Flight Into Hell”) - 6-hour drama series shot in Australia. Best ratings in Germany in 1985. 9th best rating on Channel Four in the UK. (German-French-Australian Co-production)
- 1985: Die Stunde des Léon Bisquet ("Leon Bisquet’s Dilemma”) - TV drama based on Simenon's novel "Le nègre". (ZDF - German TV)
- 1987: Ekkehard - 6-part drama series about a medieval monk. "Best Production" - Bristol Film & TV Festival. (ARD - German TV)
- 1988: Schloss Wutzenstein ("Wutzenstein’s Castle”) - 12-part comedy series. (German-Hungarian Co-production)
- 1990: Mikis Theodorakis - Documentary about the Greek composer. (German-Greek Co-production)
- 1991: Softwar - TV drama. (German-French Co-production)
- 1991: Ruby - Four-part comedy-SF miniseries. (ARD - German TV)
- 1992: Tanger Melody - Documentary about US writer Paul Bowles. (ARD - German TV)
- 1993: Les vacances de l'inspecteur Lester ("Inspector Lester’s Vacation”) - TV thriller with Claude Rich. (Executive Producer - French-Hungarian Co-production)
- 1994: Baldipata - TV drama with Charles Aznavour, Annie Cordy. (Executive Producer - French-Hungarian Co-production)
- 1995: Sonatina Romana - Lyrical documentary about Rome. (Hungarian-Italian Co-production - Directed by István Gaál)
- 1996: Pop for Peace - Pop concert in Okučani, Croatia, for IFOR soldiers of 9 nations. (MTV - Hungarian TV)
- 1999: Bei aller Liebe ("By All My Love”) - 2 episodes of a German TV drama series. (Line Producer - TeleNorm Film and ARD Germany)
- 2000: Luftpiraten ("Air Pirates”) - Action movie directed by Joe Coppoletta. (Line Producer - TeleNorm Film and RTL Germany)

== Bibliography ==
Pretty Girls and Terrorists was written by André Libik and published in 2000. The book is an autobiography and describes many parts of his life. It has received considerable critical acclaim. In 2006 the second edition of Pretty Girls and Terrorists was published.
