= Heinz Sielmann =

German zoologist, wildlife photographer and documentary filmmaker

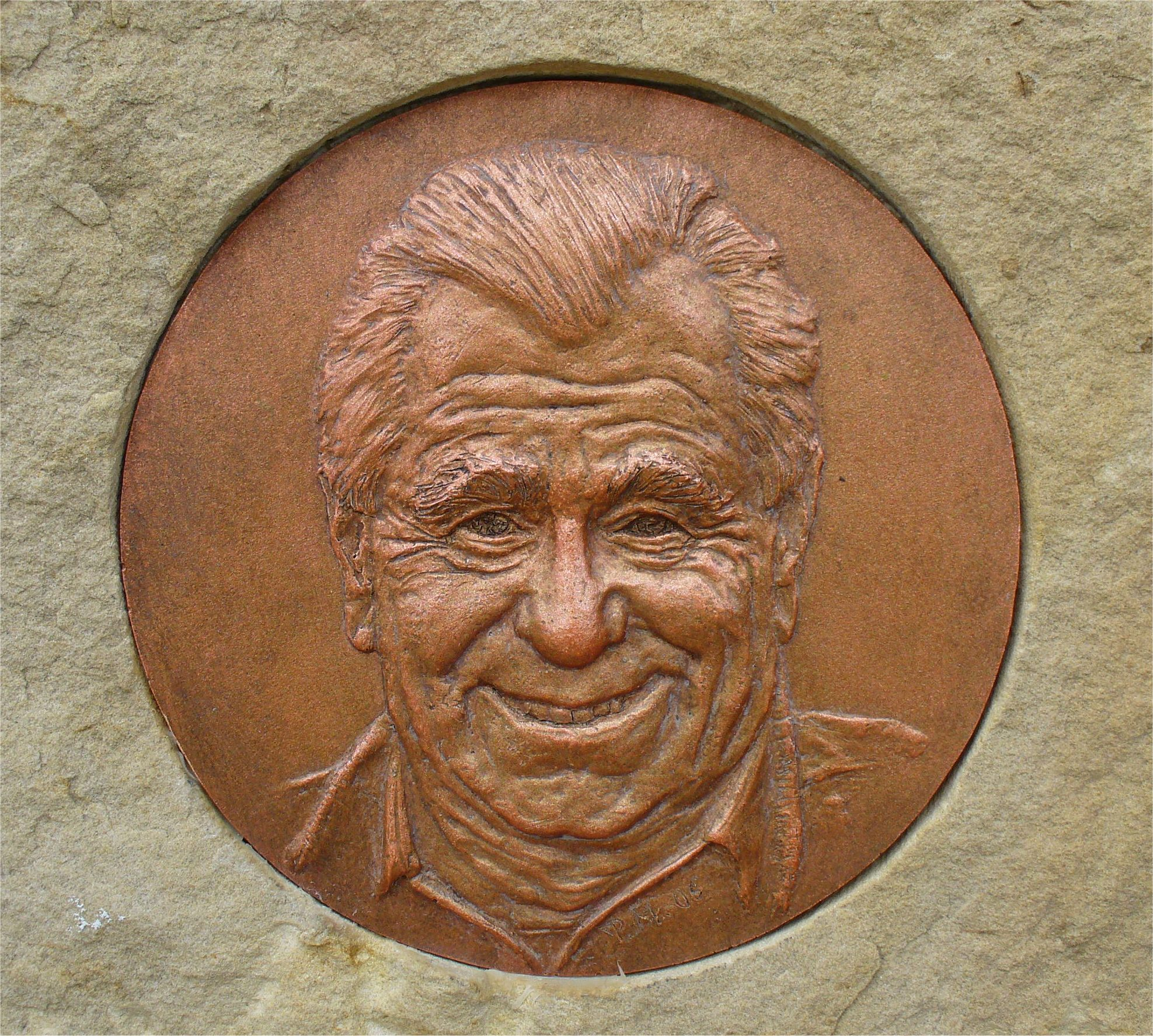
- Portrait of Sielmann on his gravestone
- Born: 2 June 1917; Rheydt, German Empire
- Died: 6 October 2006 (aged 89); Munich, Germany
- Occupations: Wildlife photographer, biologist, zoologist and documentary filmmaker
- Notable work: Windows in the Woods

Heinz Sielmann (2 June 1917 – 6 October 2006) was a German wildlife photographer, biologist, zoologist and documentary filmmaker.

== Early life ==
Heinz's father was physician Paul Sielmann. In 1923, his Family moved to East Prussia where Heinz studied at the Königsberg Hufengymnasium.

In 1937 Sielmann was inspired after watching the film ''Das Jahr der Elche'' ("Year of the elk", 1936–37) made by Horst Siewert which was shown during the International Hunting Exhibition in Berlin. Sielmann's first film, in 1938, was the silent movie Vögel über Haff und Wiesen (Birds over Curonian Lagoon and meadows), partially made in the Memelland which at the time was under Lithuanian control. Further work was interrupted by World War II. He was initially stationed in occupied Poland in Poznań (then "Posen"), as an instructor at a radio-communications training unit of the Luftwaffe Signals School. Sielmann gained a degree in biology and specialized in zoology, in 1940, at the University of Posen, at that time a Germanized university. There he met Joseph Beuys, who was his trainee, and they both attended lectures in biology and zoology. Later he was stationed in Crete, where he worked in cinematographically. Following time as a prisoner of war of the British in Cairo and London he started editing the material from Crete in London for a three-part documentary.

== Career ==
After the war he began widely recognized work for the Educational Film Institute of the Federal Republic of Germany. His feature film about woodpeckers, Carpenters of the Forest (Zimmerleute des Waldes, 1954; UK title: Woodpecker) was a huge success in the United Kingdom when broadcast by the BBC in 1955 at the behest of Sir Peter Scott. It earned Sielmann the nickname "Mr Woodpecker".

His work includes the movies Lords of the Forest (better known in the USA under its title Masters of the Congo Jungle) (1959), the English version narrated by Orson Welles; Galapagos – Dream Island in the Pacific (1962); Vanishing Wilderness (1973); and The Mystery of Animal Behavior.

During the collaboration on some National Geographic wildlife documentaries in the late 1960s he met Walon Green with whom he worked as additional photographer on the Academy Award-winning documentary The Hellstrom Chronicle about insects in 1971. Sielmann was awarded the Royal Geographical Society's Cherry Kearton Medal and Award in 1973. He was also cinematographer on the American wildlife documentary, Birds do it..., Bees do it... in 1974.

He was mentioned in the 1972 Monty Python's Flying Circus episode "Blood, Devastation, Death, War, and Horror" as being engaged in a life or death struggle with Peter Scott over repeat fees of overseas sales, joined by an enraged Jacques Cousteau.

In 1994 he established the Heinz Sielmann-Stiftung, which successfully reintroduced beavers and otters in Germany.

His first television work for German Television began in 1956. His series Expeditionen ins Tierreich (Expeditions into the Animal Kingdom), broadcast on national German television from 1965 to 1991 in 152 installments, made him a household name.

== Death and legacy ==
Sielmann died aged 89 in Munich and was buried in the German town of Duderstadt.

A Google Doodle honoring his 101st birthday appeared on 2 June 2018.

== Bibliography ==
- 1959: Windows in the Woods, Harper & Bros, New York, ASIN B0007DUDS4
- 1959: My Year with the Woodpeckers, Barrie and Rockliff, London
- 1981: Wilderness expeditions, Franklyn Watts, New York, ISBN 0-531-09857-5
