= Jeff Gordon, Secret Agent =

1963 film

- Directed by: Raoul André
- Written by: Michel Lebrun
- Produced by: Jacques Roitfeld
- Starring: Eddie Constantine; Perrette Pradier; Daniel Emilfork
- Cinematography: Henri Persin
- Edited by: Gabriel Rongier
- Music by: Michel Magne
- Production companies: Belmont Films; Fida Cinematografica
- Release date: 11 March 1964
- Countries: France; Italy
- Language: French

Jeff Gordon, Secret Agent (French: Des frissons partout, Italian: Jeff Gordon, il diabolico detective) is a 1963 French-Italian comedy crime spy film directed by Raoul André that stars Eddie Constantine, Perrette Pradier and Daniel Emilfork. A caper, it follows the adventures of Jeff Gordon, a tough FBI agent chasing an international jewel thief, who is helped by Lisa, an attractive private investigator.

== Plot ==
In Paris in 1963 a local gang rob a jewellery shop, getting away with a fortune in diamonds. Their haul is snatched from them by another gang under the notorious Grégori, wanted by several crime-fighting agencies. One is the FBI, whose top man in France is Jeff Gordon, posing as an international gangster. With back-up from the local police, he gets on the trail of Grégori and the loot. Clues lead him to a manor in the country run by a Dr Mercier as a rest home for rich invalids, particularly neurotic women, but his initiatives keep getting foiled by a young woman named Lisa. After much competition between the two, she eventually admits she is a private investigator hired by the insurers to find the diamonds and agrees to co-operate. She gets a lawyer to name her part-owner of the manor and Jeff gets admitted as a patient. While they try to sniff out Mercier's racket and discover if Grégori is there. the gang that lost the diamonds are also preparing to assault the manor. Snooping about, Jeff discovers a hidden operating theatre where Mercier alters the faces and fingerprints of criminals. Next day he is going to operate on Grégori, but Jeff replaces him in the theatre robes and mask. The operation does not proceed because the other gang attack the manor in force with automatics and grenades, followed shortly by squads of police. Jeff gets away, leaving Grégori's diamonds with Lisa, but she is stuck in a tooth and nails fight with an equally pretty patient who also had her eye on Jeff.

== Cast ==
- Eddie Constantine as Jeff Gordon
- Perrette Pradier as Lisa Lambert
- Daniel Emilfork as Yanakos - le grec
- Clément Harari as Lorenz/Dr Gordon/Dr Mercier
- Jean Galland as Le commissaire
- Paul Bonifas as Le notaire
- Daphné Dayle as Barbara
- Sophie Hardy as Claudine
- Bernard Musson as M. Edmond - le paralytique
- Victor Beaumont as Grégori
- André Bernard as L'inspecteur Alphonse Bertin
- Jean-Jacques Steen as Sam Pellot
- Dominique Zardi as Lucien
- Henri Lambert as Jojo
- Willy Braque as Émile - un homme de Lorenz
- Patricia Viterbo as L'infirmière
- Janine Vila as Liliane
- Nando Gazzolo as Le docteur Mercier
- André Badin as Le docteur Blanc
- Robert Berri as L'homme au landau
- Pierre Collet as Un gendarme
- Albert Dinan as L'indicateur

== Bibliography ==
- Philippe Rège. Encyclopedia of French Film Directors, Volume 1. Scarecrow Press, 2009.
