= Zhdanovka =

River in Russia

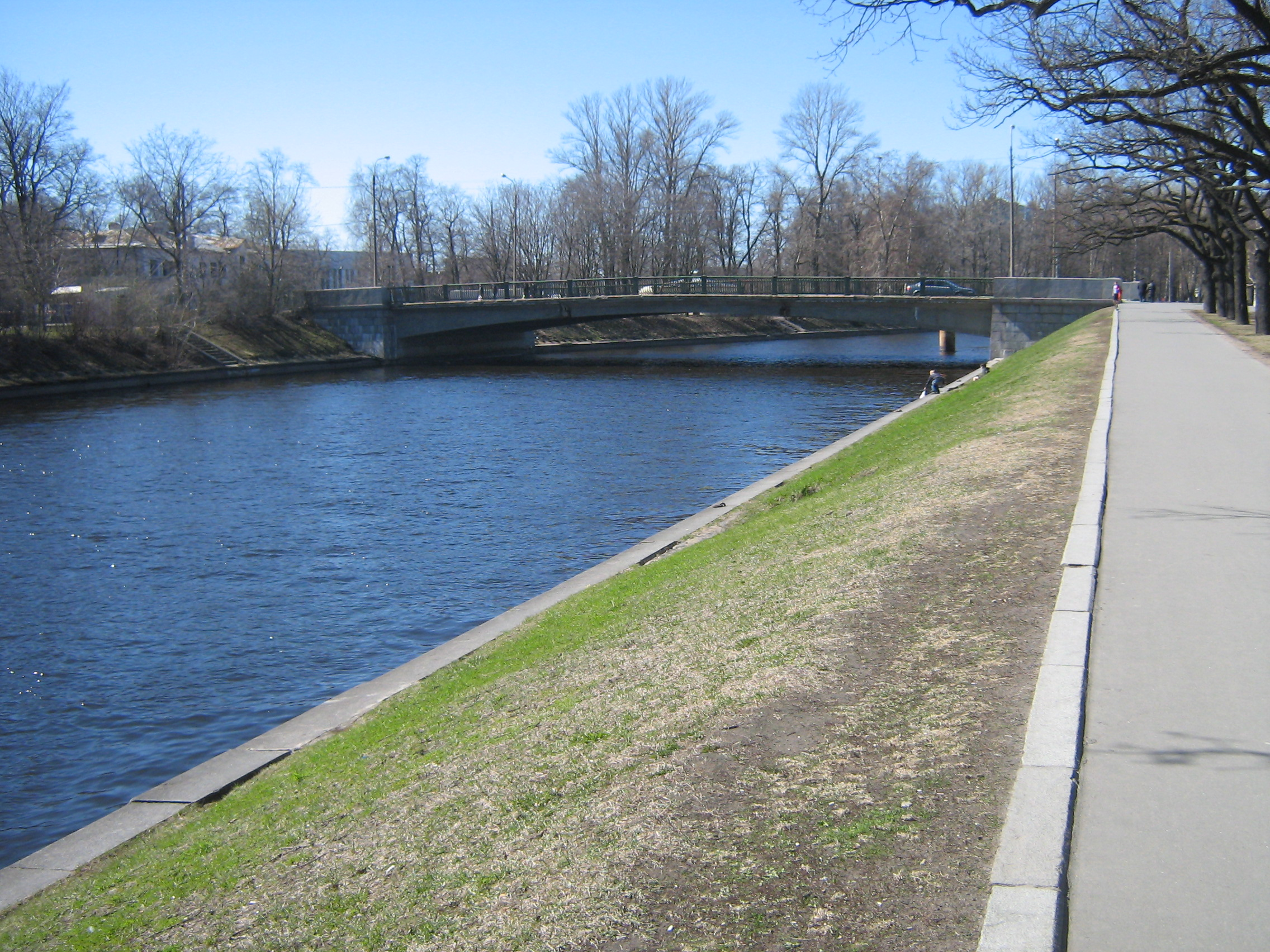
- Zhdanovka River at Saint Petersburg, Russia

- Mourth of the Zhdanovka

Physical characteristics
- Mouth
  - coordinates: 59.9634°N 30.2633°E

The Zhdanovka (Russian: Ждановка) is a short river in the Neva river delta in Saint Petersburg, Russia. It separates Petrogradsky Island from Petrovsky Island.

== History ==
In the 17th century, the river did not have a specific name; however, it was sometimes referred to the St. Nicholas river (named after the chapel of the nearby Church of the Assumption). The place was also called "Mokrushi" (Russian: Мокруши) because the area is surrounded by wetlands. In the 19th century, construction began on the deserted island Petrovsky. The Zhdanov brothers, Ivan and Nicholas, where the first to be granted land on the island. The Zhdanovs lined the river banks of the Malaya Neva to the current Little Petrovsky Bridge. Here, the brothers built a chemical-pharmaceutical plant, which drew up the birch tar and wood vinegar. The Brother's development of the area led their name being used refer to the river and the street along it. On the left bank of the river, the Petrovsky park was developed with lakes and canals.

== Geography ==
The river flows in a northwesterly direction. The river is 2.2 kilometres (1.4 mi) long, has an average width of about 30 metres (98 ft), and depths ranging from 2.2 to 4.0 metres (7.2 to 13.1 ft). The river has an average discharge of 14 cubic metres per second (490 cu ft/s). The area is home to the city landfill.

In the lower reaches of the banks are industrial enterprises, including a Vulcan Inc. plant, a Bavarian brewery, and others. The left bank is equipped with a wooden pile fastening, which has become unfit for duty or almost completely destroyed. The coastal slope is covered with trees and shrubs. The right bank is also overgrown with trees and shrubs. Surrounding areas are covered with large boulders, pebbles, gravel and construction debris. There are many piers and jetties.

== Stabilization of the banks ==
Both banks of the Zhdanovka have been strengthened with wooden walls to prevent soil erosion. A wooden wall in ruins on the left bank preserves the lower Little Petrovsky Bridge. The first section of shore protection was built on the slopes of the Tuchkova dam on the right bank. Zhdanivka Tuchkova from bridge to bridge Zhdanov in 1931–1935 years. The project engineers were G.K. Usov, I.B. Tarasenko and the architect was K. M. Dmitriev. It was a low wall on wooden stilts with a curved outline of the slope, fenced diabase paving, and cast iron fence art casting. In 1962, this segment was rebuilt with a high granite wall. The project engineer was G.S. Yakovleva, and the architect was L.A. Noskov. As a result, the channel narrowed to 48 metres (157 ft) from its original width of 54 metres (177 ft). At the same time, a low wall was built around the stadium. From 1963 to 1976, the river bank was fortified with more durable materials in the form of a low granite wall with a light pile foundation and a gentle green slope. Downstream 340 metres (1,120 ft) from the Little Petrovsky Bridge along the right bank, including the tip of Cape Leontief, was a reinforced concrete retaining wall, which is now virtually destroyed.

== Bridges ==
The wooden bridges that cross the river have existed since 1817. The first was a cadet bridge, which was originally located downstream. The Zhdanovsky bridge number 2 was built in 1939 for the passage to the sports center in place. Zhdanovsky bridge number 1 was dismantled after the construction of high wall on the right bank of the river.
