= List of film and television accidents =

In the history of film and television, accidents have occurred during shooting. From 1980 to 1990, there were 37 deaths relating to accidents during stunts; 24 of these deaths involved the use of helicopters. Equestrianism has also been a perennial cause. There have been at least 194 serious accidents on American television and film sets from 1990 to 2014, and at least 43 deaths, according to the Associated Press.

† indicates accidents and/or incidents resulting in death.

== 1900s ==
† indicates accidents and/or incidents resulting in death.

- † Untitled Clarendon short film (1907). On 17 April 1907, cycle builder Wilhelm Valdemar Zeitz was working on a short film produced by the Clarendon Film Company, which was to also feature the heroic feats of Zeitz's pet dog, a Great Dane named Felix. Zeitz was lying on a train track at Stoat's Nest station when an approaching train hit a sleeper and fatally struck Zeitz in the back and punctured one of his lungs.
- † Untitled French film (1909). M. Otreps was a professional acrobat who was performing a stunt near the Seine on 14 June 1909. He jumped from a Bellevue pontoon into the river and drowned when he struggled to stay upright in the raging current, and observers neglected to rush to his aid.

== 1910s ==
† indicates accidents and/or incidents resulting in death.

- † Across the Border (1914). On July 1, 1914, while filming on location in Cañon City, Colorado, cast member Grace McHugh was filming a scene where her character was crossing the Arkansas River in a boat. When the boat capsized, camera operator Owen Carter immediately jumped into the river to save her. Carter dragged McHugh onto a sandbar that was reported to be quicksand, resulting in both drowning. Carter received a posthumous Carnegie Hero Award for his rescue efforts.
- The Birth of a Nation (1915). Future film director Erich von Stroheim fell off a roof and broke two ribs in one scene as an extra.
- The Girl of the Golden West (1915). Actor House Peters suffered serious burns to his face and hands when a prop pistol exploded upon being fired.
- † The Captive (1915). During filming of a scene where soldiers were required to break down a locked door, the extras fired at the door using live ammunition to give the scene more realism. Director Cecil B. DeMille then ordered the extras to reload with blanks to film the next shot in which the door is broken down. One of the extras inadvertently left a live round in his rifle which discharged, shooting another extra, Charles Chandler, in the head, killing him instantly.
- The Woman God Forgot (1917). In one scene, extras were required to be thrown over the side of an Aztec pyramid. The pyramid was built of wood and covered in paper on which sand had been glued to create the appearance of stone. The extras were badly scraped as they slid down the side of the structure. Having expected such injuries, a crew member was waiting at the bottom with a bucket of iodine.
- The Valley of the Giants (1919). Silent-era star Wallace Reid was badly injured in a train crash during filming in Oregon. His injuries caused him severe pain and the studio supplied him with increasing quantities of morphine so he could keep working. Addicted to morphine and also suffering from alcoholism, Reid died in 1923 at the age of 31.
- Wet and Warmer (1919). Comedian Billie Ritchie, while working on a short comedy film, was kicked in the stomach by an ostrich.

== 1920s ==
† indicates accidents and/or incidents resulting in death.

- Haunted Spooks (1920). On the set of a publicity shoot that took place while filming, actor and comedian Harold Lloyd picked up what he thought was a prop bomb with the fuse lit but realized too late the bomb was real. It detonated, blowing off the thumb and first finger of his right hand and also temporarily blinding him. (Lloyd's brother would lose one eye in a separate movie accident in 1932). For the rest of his career, Lloyd concealed his missing fingers with a prosthetic glove.
- † The Skywayman (1920). Pilots Milton Elliott and Ormer Locklear were killed on August 2, 1920, during filming of a nighttime stunt spin at the DeMille Airfield, along Wilshire Blvd. in Los Angeles, when their plane crashed into the sludge pool of an oil well during a climactic dive. The lighting team was said to have failed to douse the lights on cue, blinding the flight crew. The film was released, exploiting publicity surrounding the deaths.
- Manslaughter (1922). Stunt man Leo Noomis was required to crash a police motorcycle into the side of a car at 45 miles per hour (72 km/h). Noomis suffered six broken ribs and a fractured pelvis while performing the stunt.
- Trifling Women (1922). An orangutan called Joe Martin attacked actor Edward Connelly, biting him, mangling his hand and possibly breaking his arm.
- † Around the World in Eighteen Days or The Eagle's Talons (unknown episode of 1922/3 serial). Stunt pilot Gene (Jean) Edward Perkins fell to his death while shooting a scene where he was to hang from a rope ladder off the side of a plane while attempting to transfer to a moving train.
- The Eleventh Hour (1923). Stunt pilot Dick Kerwood (or Curwood) suffered a severe concussion during filming. He was to parachute from a Standard-J biplane which was loaded with explosives set to go off after he bailed out of the aircraft. However the timer was faulty, causing the explosives to detonate when Kerwood was still on board. He was thrown clear and, although dazed, managed to open his parachute in time. He died in another stunt a year later.
- Souls for Sale (1923). Actress Barbara La Marr injured her ankle during filming and doctors prescribed not only morphine but also cocaine to control the pain and enable her to continue filming. Working on the production left La Marr addicted to drugs, a factor that contributed to her premature death three years later.
- The Brass Bottle (1923). Charlie the elephant attacked long-time trainer Curley Stecker, causing rib fractures, lacerations, contusions and a concussion. After a public debate, the often-escaping elephant was subsequently put down.
- The Covered Wagon (1923). Bert Alping was "thrown from a cliff...and severely hurt."
- Hearts Aflame (1923). Lead actress Anna Q. Nilsson was seriously burned while filming a scene in which she drove a locomotive through a staged forest fire in British Columbia. She required a week to recuperate; however, the accident did not impede her career. Her costar and a cameraman were also injured.
- † The Great Circus Mystery (1925). Stuntmen Frank Tully and Tony Brack were killed in an auto accident. The footage is in the film.
- † The Desert Fiddler (1924). Stunt swimmer William Harbaugh drowned while filming a water scene in the Colorado River near Laguna Dam.
- † The King of Wild Horses (1924). An Arabian horse fell on C.P. "Chick" Morrison shortly after filming was complete; Morrison died en route to the hospital.
- † Raffles, the Amateur Cracksman (1925). Veteran actor Kate Lester was killed by a space heater explosion in her dressing room.
- Sherlock Jr. (1924). While hanging from a water tower, Buster Keaton pulled a rope that released water from the tower, knocking him to the ground. In the scene, he stood and ran into the distance. During a routine physical examination 11 years later, an X-ray revealed that Keaton's neck had been fractured.
- † The Warrens of Virginia (1924). On November 29, 1923, while working on location in San Antonio, Texas, Martha Mansfield was severely burned when a match, tossed by a cast member, ignited her Civil War costume of hoopskirts and flimsy ruffles. Mansfield was playing the role of Agatha Warren and had just finished her scenes and retired to a car when her clothing burst into flames. Her neck and face were saved when leading man Wilfred Lytell threw his heavy overcoat over her. The hands of the chauffeur of Mansfield's car were badly burned while he tried to remove the actress's burning clothing. The fire was put out, but she sustained substantial burns to her body and died the following day.
- America (1924). During the filming by D. W. Griffith of a recreation of the Battle of Bunker Hill at Somers, New York, a 19-year-old soldier's arm was blown off while reloading a cannon. As Charles Emmett Mack recalled, "Neil Hamilton and I went to neighboring towns and raised a fund for him—I doing a song and dance and Neil collecting a coin."
- † The Air Hawk (unknown episode 1924) or The Cloud Rider (1925). In October 1924, pilot and wing-walker Dick Kerwood (or Curwood) fell unseen to his death while performing a flying rope ladder stunt for an Al Wilson aerial serial. He had suffered a serious spinal injury from an earlier stunt that may not have fully recovered (see above The Eleventh Hour).
- † Ben-Hur (1925). An early filming attempt of the chariot race was done on location at the Circus Maximus in Rome. It brought about the death of one stuntman when a wheel of his chariot broke.
- The General (1926). During filming of the epic comedy in Oregon, there were a number of incidents. Several National Guardsmen, employed as extras for the Civil War battle scenes, were injured by mishaps caused by misfired muskets or explosions. Director and star Buster Keaton was knocked unconscious when he stood too close to a cannon firing. Assistant director Harry Barnes was accidentally hit in the face by a blank charge. Train brakeman Fred Lowry sued the production for US$2,900 after his foot was crushed when it was run over by a locomotive wheel during filming of one of the railway scenes.
- Wings (1927). During filming of the World War I aerial combat scenes, stunt pilot Dick Grace was required to deliberately crash-land a Fokker D-VII, specially modified to "crumple" on impact. When the Fokker struck the ground, the landing gear failed to crumple, making the impact a heavier one than planned. This caused Grace's safety straps to break, sending his head through the instrument panel, leaving him with four crushed vertebrae and a broken neck. Grace spent only six weeks in the hospital and was again performing stunt work within a year.
- † The King of the Jungle (1927). Gordon Standing was mauled by a lion on-set and soon died of his injuries. This serial is considered to be lost, and only a trailer remains.
- † Noah's Ark (1928). Three people died, one man lost a leg and a number were injured in a scene where several hundred extras were caught in the "Great Flood." The deaths were instrumental in the introduction of film safety regulations the following year.
- † The Trail of '98 (1928). Stunt men Howard Daughters, Jerome Bautin, and Red Thompson were killed on Abercrombie Rapids between Miles and Childs Glaciers in Alaska.
- † The Red Dance (1928). An extra named Don Silverwood, who failed to take cover behind a shelter, was struck in the neck by a rock from an explosion staged for war scenes filmed near Truckee. According to AP, he succumbed to his injuries in hospital.
- † The Aviator (1929). During aerial scouting for locations, an aircraft crashed, killing cameraman Alvin Knechtel and actor and stunt pilot William Hauber.
- The Godless Girl (1929). The filming of one scene required cast members Lina Basquette and George Duryea to be trapped in a burning building and both actors had their clothing, hair and exposed skin covered with an asbestos coating. During filming, Duryea, concerned that the pyrotechnic flames were getting too hot and too close, retreated from the set but Basquette, eager to impress director Cecil B. DeMille, insisted on remaining until the scene was completed despite the intense heat. The actress suffered serious burns and blistering to her forearms and her eyebrows and lashes were singed.
- Thunder (1929). Lon Chaney, during filming, got artificial snow lodged in his throat, causing a serious infection. He also developed pneumonia. In late 1929, Chaney was diagnosed with bronchial lung cancer. Despite aggressive treatment, his condition gradually worsened, and he died of a throat hemorrhage on 26 August 1930, in a Los Angeles, California hospital. (Note: The New York Times reported: "Lon Chaney dies after brave fight. On road to recovery, screen actor is stricken by hemorrhage of the throat. Was a master of makeup. Son of deaf and dumb Parents, He began career as property boy. Excelled in vivid personations. Acted as Pike's Peak guide. Made stage debut at 17. Appeared in slap-stick comedy. Wore straitjacket as "Hunchback." New disguise for each film. Although he was believed to be on the road to recovery, Lon Chaney, screen actor, who had been making a valiant fight against anemia and bronchial congestion, died at 12:55.")
- Unknown film (1929). Strongheart, a German Shepherd dog film star, was accidentally burned after coming into contact with a hot studio light. The burn became tumorous, leading to his death later that year.
- Unknown film (1920s). Like Harold Lloyd, the comedy-thrillers which Monty Banks produced were popular but became increasingly risky throughout the decade. In one, Banks was seriously injured after being roped to the back of a car and dragged down a cliff face.

== 1930s ==
† indicates accidents and/or incidents resulting in death.

- † Hell's Angels (1930). Three pilots were killed during the filming. The sole Sikorsky S-29-A, owned by Roscoe Turner, which portrayed a German Gotha bomber, crashed during filming on March 22, 1929, when stunt pilot Al Wilson put it in a spin for its final scene and was unable to recover. He was ready to bail out and called back to his mechanic Phil Jones (who was in the rear of the plane dumping lampblack to simulate smoke) to jump, but Jones did not hear him and went down with the plane. Only one brief shot of the spinning Sikorsky was used in the film. Two other stunt pilots, Clement Phillips and Al Johnson, were killed in separate accidents; the latter flying into high-voltage power lines. Producer-director Howard Hughes was badly injured when he personally piloted a low-altitude aerial maneuver after the professional stunt men informed him it could not be done safely or successfully. They were proven right when Hughes crashed and suffered severe head injuries. Hughes underwent plastic surgery to undo the damage to his face, but his left cheekbone could not be repaired.
- † Such Men Are Dangerous (1930). During aerial filming off the coast of Southern California near Santa Monica on January 2, 1930, two Stinson Detroiter aircraft, employed as camera-planes, collided over the ocean. All 10 men on board the two planes were killed, including director Kenneth Hawks (brother of Howard Hawks), assistant director Max Gold, cinematographer Conrad Wells, director of photography George Eastman, cameramen Otto Jordan and Ben Frankel, two property men and both pilots. Only five bodies were recovered. As it was one of the final scenes to be filmed, the movie was still completed on schedule. Families of the men who were lost took legal action against Fox Film Company, but the courts ruled in favour of the latter.
- † The Viking (1931). After completion of filming in Canada, producer, co-director and real-life adventurer Varick Frissell decided that more footage of the Labrador ice floes was required. He and a small film crew joined the real ship The Viking on a seal-hunting voyage to obtain the footage he wanted. On 15 March, the ship became trapped in ice near Horse Isles and dynamite stored on board (intended for breaking up ice floes) accidentally detonated, destroying the vessel and killing 27 men, including Frissell and cameraman Alexander Penrod.
- Scarface (1932). Gaylord Lloyd while on the set of the gangster film either as a segment director or visitor (accounts differ), was blinded in one eye by a flying splinter from a copper explosive squib cap. Much like his brother Harold before him (losing part of his right hand to a prop bomb), Gaylord was permanently maimed by an on-set accident.
- The Little Minister (1934). John Beal nearly lost his sight when an extra accidentally stabbed him in his eye during the filming of the mob scene.
- Four Frightened People (1934). During filming in Hawaii, actress Claudette Colbert was required to stand up to her neck in a real swamp. This scene was shot on her first day on set after having undergone an emergency appendectomy and Colbert and the director disregarded concerns raised by the on-set nurse. Filming in the unsanitary conditions while not yet fully recovered led to Colbert being hospitalized with a severe fever two days later.
- The Lost Patrol (1934). During filming in high temperatures in Buttercup Valley near Yuma, Arizona, Director John Ford insisted his cast and crew only work in the early mornings and late afternoons to avoid the most intense heat of each day. Under pressure from RKO to speed up filming, producer Cliff Reid insisted that the midday break be shortened. Ford refused, believing that many of the crew would be at risk of heatstroke in the 120 °F (49 °C) conditions. Reid tried to prove his point by walking around in the open in the midday heat and soon collapsed with heat exhaustion, requiring hospital treatment.
- The Crusades (1935). While filming a battle scene in which horses fell into a moat, four stunt riders sustained serious injuries which required hospitalization. All four of their horses were injured so severely they had to be euthanized. It was recommended that the injured stuntmen receive extra pay, but director Cecil B. DeMille refused, saying that the riders had "bungled a simple scene".
- † The Charge of the Light Brigade (1936). During the filming of the charge sequence, a stuntman was killed when he fell off his horse and landed on a broken sword that was lying on the field, unfortunately wedged in such a position that its blade was sticking straight up. Dozens of horses were killed in the making of the film, and consequently Hollywood adopted more stringent animal protection guidelines.
- Saratoga (1937). Lionel Barrymore broke his hip after tripping on a cable on the set of that film. Jean Harlow also died of kidney failure during production, and the film had to be completed with a double standing in for her in select scenes.
- † The Road Back (1937). Specialist marksman George Daly, an ex-Marine who fired live ammunition from a Thompson submachine gun near actors including Paul Muni and Edward G. Robinson, died in a stunt explosion during the World War I battle scenes. He had taken out a $10,000 life assurance policy two weeks before the accident.
- Jesse James (1939). A horse was killed during the scene where it was ridden off a cliff into a river by Cliff Lyons. This incident led to the American Humane Association opening a Hollywood office in 1940 and monitoring the treatment of animals in films.
- The Adventures of Robin Hood (1938). During the melee scene where Robin escapes from the banquet hall, Basil Rathbone was trampled by an extra whose spear cut his foot badly, requiring eight stitches to close the wound. Errol Flynn also complained about being poked by prop swords which for realism lacked protective tip covers.
- The Wizard of Oz (1939). Margaret Hamilton was badly burned during a scene in which her character, the Wicked Witch of the West, "vanished" in a burst of flame and smoke. An elevator was to lower her under the stage, after which a gout of flame would be released; during one take, the pyrotechnic device went off too soon. Hamilton suffered second-degree burns on her face and third-degree burns on her right hand. The studio physician was called in and Hamilton was saved from any further injury. Hamilton considered suing Metro-Goldwyn-Mayer as a result of the incident. Hamilton's stunt double Betty Danko was also injured in a scene involving a smoking broomstick. Danko was seated on a smoking pipe arranged to look like the witch's broom. While filming the third take of the sequence, the pipe exploded, sending her flying off the air. She spent eleven days at the hospital with her legs being permanently scarred. She continued doing stunt work though. Buddy Ebsen suffered a severe reaction to the aluminum powder which was dusted over his Tin Woodman makeup and aggravated a congenital bronchial condition. He was unable to continue working on the production and was replaced by Jack Haley. Terry, the dog who plays Toto, had sustained a foot injury and was replaced with another dog for two weeks to allow for a full recovery. Two of the actors playing the flying monkeys were injured during the Haunted Forest scene, when the wires holding them up gave way and snapped, causing them to plummet several feet to the ground.
- Hotel Imperial (1939). Actor Ray Milland was seriously injured while filming a cavalry charge scene through a small village. While making a planned jump over an obstacle, the horse's saddle came loose and Milland fell onto a pile of masonry. He spent a week in hospital with concussion, a three-inch gash to his forehead and a badly injured left hand.

== 1940s ==
† indicates accidents and/or incidents resulting in death.

- Citizen Kane (1941). While filming, Orson Welles tripped down a staircase and chipped his anklebone, forcing him to use a wheelchair for the next two weeks. Welles also gashed his own hand during a scene where he destroyed a room. Welles quickly improvised, grabbing a curtain and using it to cover his bleeding hand while he completed the scene, which appears in the film.
- † My Life for Ireland (1941). An anti-British propaganda film made by Nazi Germany. During the epic final-battle scene set during the Irish Civil War, several extras were killed when one of them stepped on a live land mine. The footage is said to have been included in the release prints, although no proof of this has been established.
- † They Died with Their Boots On (1941). Three horsemen perished falling off their mounts during the cavalry charge, one of whom was a wealthy young heir and polo player, Jack Budlong, whose horse tripped as he rode alongside Errol Flynn. As he fell forward, he had the foresight to toss his sword ahead of him. Unfortunately, it landed handle down and stuck in place. Budlong was impaled on his own sword, and died in a Los Angeles hospital a few hours later. (Another fatality was reportedly drunk after the lunch break when he fell off).
- Reap the Wild Wind (1942). According to a biographer, actor John Wayne suffered a chronic inner-ear condition for the rest of his life after filming underwater scenes in this production.
- † Lost Canyon (1942). Charles B. Murphy was mortally injured when a wagon overturned during a location shoot; he later died in the hospital.
- Signed with Their Honour (unfinished, 1943). This was to have been a British war film based on the 1942 novel of the same title by James Aldridge. During filming in Cheshire, a pair of Gladiator biplanes collided, injuring both pilots who managed to escape by parachute. After this incident, the film project was abandoned.
- Lifeboat (1944). Actor Hume Cronyn suffered two cracked ribs and nearly drowned when he was caught under a water-activator making waves for a storm scene directed by Alfred Hitchcock. He was saved by an on-set lifeguard.
- † The Royal Mounted Rides Again (1945). Addison "Jack" Randall was killed at Canoga Park, California, while riding a horse past the cameras at full speed on July 16, 1945, for a Universal Pictures serial, when he fell from the saddle while trying to retrieve his hat which had blown off his head, and struck a tree. He died shortly thereafter.
- Unconquered (1947). During the filming of the historical adventure, nine extras suffered burns including one man who had his hair partially burnt off because director Cecil B. DeMille insisted on using real fireballs and flaming arrows for one of the battle scenes. In another incident, stunt woman Polly Burson was filming a scene that required a canoe to go over a waterfall. She missed the tree limb she was supposed to grab onto and fell into the safety net which was below the water's surface. Landing face down in the net, she nearly drowned and was only barely able to struggle upright in time.

== 1950s ==
† indicates accidents and/or incidents resulting in death.

- The Cruel Sea (1953). During filming of the scene where the crew have to abandon a sinking warship, British actor Donald Sinden nearly drowned in the open air water tank at Denham Film Studios. Sinden could not swim and also suffered from negative buoyancy. Sinden jumped into where he thought the water would be at its shallowest but immediately went under and sank downwards. Co-star Jack Hawkins quickly noticed that Sinden was missing and dived in and rescued him. The first assistant director had asked Sinden if he could swim prior to shooting the scene. When Sinden had replied 'No', the director had assumed the actor was joking.
- Richard III (1955). During the Battle of Bosworth Field sequence, Laurence Olivier suffered an arrow wound to the shin when his horse jerked forwards. Fortunately, it was on the leg Richard was supposed to limp on, allowing the scene to continue.
- Summertime (1955). In one scene, the character of Jane Hudson falls into a canal as she steps backwards while photographing a shop in Campo San Barnaba. Leading lady Katharine Hepburn, concerned about her health, was disinclined to do the stunt herself, but director David Lean felt it would be obvious if he replaced her with a stunt double. He filled the water with a disinfectant that caused it to foam, which added to Hepburn's reluctance, then required her to film the scene four times until he was satisfied with the results. That night, Hepburn's eyes began to itch and water. She was eventually diagnosed with a rare form of conjunctivitis that plagued her for the remainder of her life.
- The Last Hunt (1955). During filming a horse got out of control causing Anne Bancroft to land hard on the horn of her saddle. Due to hospitalization she was replaced as the Native American girl by Debra Paget; although some of her long distance shots were retained in finished film.
- The Adventures of Robin Hood (1955 episode). Character actor Archie Duncan was briefly replaced by Rufus Cruikshank as Little John for ten episodes after Duncan was injured when a horse bolted toward spectators, mostly children, watching the location filming of the episode "Checkmate" on 20 April 1955. Duncan grabbed the bridle, stopping the horse, but the cart it was pulling ran him over, causing a fractured kneecap and cuts and bruises. He received the Queen's Commendation for Bravery and £1,360 in damages from Sapphire Films.
- The Conqueror (1956). The exterior scenes were shot on location near St. George, Utah, 137 miles (220 km) downwind of the United States government's Nevada Test Site. In 1953, extensive above-ground nuclear weapons testing had occurred at the test site, as part of Operation Upshot–Knothole. Director Dick Powell died of cancer in January 1963. Pedro Armendáriz was diagnosed with kidney cancer in 1960, and committed suicide in 1963 after he learned his condition had become terminal. Susan Hayward, John Wayne and Agnes Moorehead all died of cancer in the 1970s. Cast member actor John Hoyt died of lung cancer in 1991. Several of Wayne and Hayward's relatives who had visited the set also developed cancer: Michael Wayne developed skin cancer, his brother Patrick Wayne had a benign tumor removed from his breast and Hayward's son Tim Barker had a benign tumor removed from his mouth. The cast and crew totaled 220 people. By 1981, 91 of them had developed some form of cancer and 46 had died of the disease. It is not clear, however, that the cancer rate for this film crew was significantly higher than in the general population. Further, while the cast members noted developed a wide variety of cancers, according to The New England Journal of Medicine, leukemia is the only form of cancer known to develop from exposure to fallout radiation.
- The Ten Commandments (1956). Cecil B. DeMille overcame a minor heart attack while climbing down by ladder from the top of the Ancient Egyptian city gate set while filming the third take of the Exodus sequence. In another incident, during filming of a sand-storm scene, an extra carrying a flaming torch tripped over and the torch set fire to the clothing of a young girl standing next to him. Makeup artist Frank Westmore tore off the girl's costume, resulting in her only sustaining minor injuries. During the filming of the same scene, several Egyptian extras were stung by scorpions or bitten by cobras, both of which were blown out of their burrows in the sand by the artificially generated storm.
- Stopover Tokyo (1957). Actor Ken Scott was injured in a scene filmed in Japan when Edmond O'Brien fired at close range an overloaded prop pistol at him and a blank cartridge hit his face. He sustained no serious damage or permanent scarring.
- † Solomon and Sheba (1958). Probably affected by hereditary heart disease, Tyrone Power, a chain smoker who smoked three to four packs a day, had filmed about 75% of his scenes when he was stricken by a massive heart attack while filming a dueling scene with his frequent co-star and friend George Sanders. A doctor diagnosed the cause of Power's death as fulminant angina pectoris. Power died while being transported to the hospital in Madrid at the age of 44. He was replaced in the biblical epic by Yul Brynner.
- Varan the Unbelievable (1958). During filming, actor Haruo Nakajima was severely burned due to a pyrotechnics mishap. This was the only time in his career that his injuries forced him to be replaced for the remainder of the shoot.
- Auntie Mame (1958). Rosalind Russell, in the title role, broke her ankle on the first take of a scene where she runs down the stairs. Filming was delayed until she recovered.
- Ben-Hur (1959). Joe Canutt, who was Charlton Heston's stunt double, sustained a gash on his chin after being flipped out of his chariot during a chariot race scene. That unplanned but spectacular shot was incorporated into the penultimate stunt for that sequence.
- † The Horse Soldiers (1959). Fred Kennedy, a veteran stuntman and bit player, was killed in a horse fall on location in Natchitoches, Louisiana. Director John Ford was so upset he closed the set and had to film the rest of the scene later in the San Fernando Valley, and in a cut-down version.
- They Came to Cordura (1959). Dick York suffered a severe back injury during the filming that caused him great pain in his later years, so much so that he was forced to resign from his longtime role of Darrin Stephens on the 1960s television program Bewitched. In York's own words, "Gary Cooper and I were propelling a handcar carrying several 'wounded' men down [the] railroad track. I was on the bottom stroke of this sort of teeter-totter mechanism that made the handcar run. I was just lifting the handle up as the director yelled 'cut!' and one of the 'wounded' cast members reached up and grabbed the handle. I was suddenly, jarringly, lifting his entire weight off the flatbed—one hundred and eighty pounds or so. The muscles along the right side of my back tore. They just snapped and let loose."

== 1960s ==
† indicates accidents and/or incidents resulting in death.

- The Alamo (1960, United Artists). Actor Laurence Harvey, who played Colonel W. B. Travis, was injured when a cannon recoiled while firing, with one of the wheels rolling over his foot, fracturing it. He did not reveal his injury until filming of the scene was completed.
- The Magnificent Seven (1960, United Artists). In a making-of interview, juvenile lead Horst Bucholtz admitted to shooting himself in the thigh through his jeans when a pistol blank discharged, resulting in noticeable bruising.
- The Siege of Sidney Street (1960). British actor Leonard Sachs was injured while filming a scene which took place in a burning building. The room and all the props were coated with fire-proof jelly, as was the actor's shoulders and arms. However the special-effects crew neglected to apply the jelly to Sachs' head because to do so would have taken 20 minutes and the production was on a tight schedule. As a result, Sachs suffered burns to his hair and scalp while filming the scene.
- Spartacus (1960, Universal Studios). Actor Charles McGraw suffered a broken jaw on the set of the Roman epic. During the revolt at the gladiator school, Spartacus (Kirk Douglas) is seen forcing the head of evil trainer Marcellus (McGraw) into a cauldron of soup, drowning him. McGraw's jaw struck the rim of the pot, sustaining a fracture, but he managed to continue the scene nonetheless.
- The Unforgiven (1960). Actress Audrey Hepburn was thrown off a horse while rehearsing for a scene. Hepburn suffered from two broken vertebrae, and later suffered a miscarriage, which has since been attributed to the accident. Hepburn was flown out of set and spent six weeks recovering at a hospital. When she returned, Hepburn wore a back brace for the rest of production, and her wardrobe was redesigned to hide the brace.
- Maigret (1960 episode). Series co-star Ewen Solon broke his leg in a stunt while jumping from a wall. Subsequent scripts for the BBC TV series had to be rewritten to account for the obvious injury which could not be hidden or shot around.
- The Guns of Navarone (1961). Actor David Niven almost drowned during filming of an ocean storm scene inside a large water tank. He sustained a cut lip that led the actor being hospitalized with sepsis, which halted production on the film for a month. He insisted on returning to complete filming of his scenes before he had fully recovered, later causing a relapse of his illness that resulted in another seven weeks in hospital.
- Whiplash (1961 episode). Australian actor-director Joe McCormick was accidentally shot by a blank shotgun shell while filming a scene with Annette Andre. After spending two weeks in hospital, he made a full recovery.
- Route 66 (1961 episode, season 2). During filming of a fight scene for the episode titled “Mon Petit Chou” directed by Sam Peckinpah, guest star Lee Marvin suffered an unspecified injury which was reported in The New York Times.
- Cape Fear (1962, Universal Studios). According to Robert Mitchum, Gregory Peck accidentally punched him for real during the final fight scene. Mitchum felt the effects for days afterward.
- † Flower on the Stone (1962). Soviet actress Inna Burduchenko suffered third-degree burns while filming in a burning barracks on 30 July 1960. She died in the hospital on 15 August. Burduchenko was three months pregnant.
- How the West Was Won (1962, Metro-Goldwyn-Mayer). Stuntman Bob Morgan, husband of Yvonne De Carlo, was seriously injured and lost a leg during a break in filming a gunfight on a moving train. Chains holding logs on a flatbed car broke, crushing Morgan as he crouched beside them.
- The Manchurian Candidate (1962, United Artists). While filming a fight scene with Henry Silva, Frank Sinatra broke his little finger during a movement where he smashed through a table. This resulted in problems with his hand for several years and is said to be one of the reasons why he pulled out of a starring role in Dirty Harry, having to undertake surgery to alleviate pains.
- † The War Lover (1962). During aerial filming over the English Channel, parachutists jumped from a vintage B-17 to simulate a bail-out. One of the jumpers, Englishman Mike Reilly, drowned in the sea.
- Gunsmoke (1962 season 8, ep. 5). During a scene, series star James Arness slung guest artist Ruta Lee over his shoulder and as he turned around she struck her head against a door jamb causing her to lose consciousness.
- The Saint (1963 season 2). After performing the fifth take of an over-enthusiastic acrobatic fall on being shot, the guest heavy in episode 9 ("The King of the Beggars"), Oliver Reed, concussed himself which went unnoticed by the crew. Series lead Roger Moore, who was mid-speech, heard Reed's labored breathing and stopped the scene to call for the studio nurse. He recovered to complete his role.
- From Russia with Love (1963, United Artists). While scouting a location in Scotland, director Terence Young and an assistant art director nearly drowned with their pilot when their helicopter ditched. Young supported the pilot who could not swim, while they were rescued by stuntmen and other members of the film crew. Although suffering injuries to his legs, he resisted offers from the producers for David Lean to complete the film, and returned to the set soon after the crash.
- Dr. Strangelove (1964). Peter Sellers was originally to have portrayed a fourth character, Major "King" Kong, but injured his ankle while filming a take as Kong. As a result, Slim Pickens played the role. Scott Simon claims the titular character is in a wheelchair because of Sellers' ankle injury.
- Goldfinger (1964, United Artists). Harold Sakata burned his hand while filming the fight at Fort Knox, where his character, Oddjob, gets electrocuted, but continued to act as the scene was still being filmed.
- The Horror of Party Beach (1964). For the filming of the motorcycle and car chase, members of a local motorcycle club were hired to play a bike gang. Not wanting to be in the back of the field, one of the members sped up to the front and collided with the actor playing the gang leader, triggering a pileup that injured the actor and several bikers. Meanwhile, a police car responding to the incident was involved in its own crash.
- The Moon-Spinners (1964, Disney). According to Hayley Mills’ autobiography, she startled Pola Negri’s cheetah, which clawed at her clothing, causing Mills to fall against a studio lamp burning her arm. Veteran actress Negri caused a sensation by appearing before the London press at her hotel in the company of the feisty cheetah, which had also appeared in the film, on a steel chain leash.
- † There Is Such a Lad (1964). Soviet actor Boris Balakin decided, despite suffering from fever, to proceed with filming. After finishing his scene with Nina Sazonova the crew went on lunch break, while Balakin rested another moment on his chair in the décor. Trying to get up, he died of a heart attack. Director Vasily Shukshin rewrote his screenplay to keep Balakins' part in the film.
- Wonderful Life (1964). Actor Melvyn Hayes broke his foot while filming, which significantly delayed completion of the musical number where he dances with Cliff Richard and Richard O'Sullivan on a boat.
- † The Flight of the Phoenix (1965, 20th Century Fox). On 8 July 1965, pilot Paul Mantz crashed and was killed on a second take making a low pass.
- † Lt. Robin Crusoe, U.S.N. (1966, Disney). Cameraman Robert King Baggot was killed during filming in Kauai when a huge wave hit his boat and washed him overboard. Walt Disney Productions halted production on the film as a result of the accident.
- Eye of the Devil (1966). After filming two-thirds of her scenes as leading lady, accomplished rider Kim Novak had a horse fall on her causing an injury to her vertebrae, resulting in a long hospital stay. Ultimately she withdrew from completing the film and all her scenes were reshot with Deborah Kerr.
- Thunderball (1965, United Artists). While filming the scene where SPECTRE agent Angelo crashes the Avro Vulcan into the ocean near The Bahamas, the stunt double for Angelo nearly drowned when the stunt double for Emilio Largo accidentally disconnected both the prop oxygen line and the double's actual oxygen line underneath.
- † High Jungle (1966). On 28 September 1966, Rawhide star Eric Fleming was filming in Peru. During the final stages of shooting, Fleming's dugout canoe overturned in the Huallaga River. Actor Nico Minardos managed to swim to safety, but Fleming was swept away by the current and drowned, aged 41. His body was recovered three days later.
- † Softly Softly (1966 episode). On 1 November 1966, stunt performer Keith Peacock was fatally injured during filming of the episode "Heart of Brass" in a Perivale factory. Doubling for actor David Scheuer, he was slated to fall 15 feet (4.6 m) backwards from a ladder and land onto a set of mattresses. His head missed one of the mattresses and hit the concrete flooring instead, and he suffered from cerebral contusion. Peacock died in Central Middlesex Hospital at 5:20 a.m.
- † Le Judoka Agent Secret (1966). On her last day of filming, French actress Patricia Viterbo accidentally backed her sports car into the Seine during a scene and drowned as she was unable to swim. Her accompanying co-star Henri Garcin escaped, but there are conflicting versions of whether he was at the wheel while they were returning from lunch.
- † Le Saint prend l'affût (1966). The doyen of French stunt drivers, Gil(bert-Yves) Delamare, was skidding a Renault Floride S convertible for a twilight scene on a new patch of freeway when its back axle snapped rolling him and his passengers into a barrier. He was mortally injured when he struck his head on the windscreen. The stunt passengers were thrown clear and survived.
- You Only Live Twice (1967, United Artists). While filming an autogyro flight scene in Miyazaki Prefecture, cameraman John Jordan, who was standing on the landing strut of the camera helicopter, was struck in the foot by the autogyro's blade. Although doctors in the area were able to reattach the foot, he had it amputated when he returned to the UK. A few years later Jordan was killed during the filming of Catch-22.
- † Don't Make Waves (1967). The aerial parachuting sequences for this black comedy were photographed by freefall cinematographer Bob Buquor. Buquor lost control of the parachute and landed in the Pacific Ocean off Malibu, California and drowned.
- † Pontiac commercial (1967). Cameraman Raffael John Esposito and actress Brenda Lee Meinsenheimer were killed in Thousand Oaks, California, when a camera boom suspended from an oncoming camera car crashed through the windshield of their car.
- † Les grandes vacances (1967). Aerial unit director and stunt flyer Jean Falloux, a former French Air Force inversion (upside down flight) record-holder, and his passenger were killed when they crashed a light plane while attempting to land on a speeding car for this comedy, which was dedicated to his memory.
- Star Trek (1967, Paramount Pictures). During the filming of the "Arena" episode, William Shatner and Leonard Nimoy were too close to an explosion. They both developed tinnitus as a result.
- The Rat Patrol (1967 episode). While filming a scene on January 4, 1967, series star Christopher George, as well as fellow cast members Justin Tarr and Gary Raymond, were injured when the Jeep Tarr was driving overturned on a dry lakebed at Rosamond, California as they made a tight turn. George sustained a concussion, tearing something in his neck and injuring his back. Raymond broke his ankle, and Tarr received a minor arm injury. Doctors at Cedars-Sinai Medical Center in California were able to determine that his back had been badly sprained, not fractured, as they had initially feared.
- Night of the Living Dead (1968). Crew member Gary Streiner accidentally set himself on fire while attempting to ignite a prop with gasoline. Actor Bill Hinzman managed to put out the fire, saving Streiner's life. Hinzman received a hero badge.
- The Lion in Winter (1968). Peter O'Toole cut off the tip of his finger in a boating accident during the production of this film. He dropped it in brandy before placing it back on top of his finger and wrapping the digit in bandages. When he removed the bandages weeks later, he found that he had put the fingertip back on the wrong way around.
- Where Eagles Dare (1968, Metro-Goldwyn-Mayer). Derren Nesbitt was injured on set whilst filming the scene in which his character is killed. The blood squib attached to Nesbitt exploded with such force that he was temporarily blinded, though he made a quick recovery.
- The Wild Wild West (1968 season 4). Series co-lead Robert Conrad did most of his own stunts and fight scenes for the action TV program, and while filming the episode "The Night of the Fugitives", he was injured and rushed to the hospital after he dove from the top of a saloon staircase, lost his grip on a chandelier, fell 12 feet, and landed on his head. The accident was left in the final cut of that program.
- † Battle of Britain (1969). Spanish Air Force pilot Don Federico Eglesias Lanzo was killed in a crash at Tablada, Seville.
- † Director (1969). Soviet actor Yevgeni Urbansky died in an accident while performing a stunt during filming on 5 November 1965.

== 1970s ==
† indicates accidents and/or incidents resulting in death.

- † Barquero (1970). On August 28, 1969, director Robert Sparr was killed in a plane crash while scouting filming locations with cameraman Gerald Finnerman. The single-engine plane they were riding in went down near the Brush Hollow Reservoir outside of Penrose, Colorado. The pilot was also killed in the crash, but Finnerman survived. One of the film's stars, Lee Van Cleef, was scheduled to accompany Sparr and Finnerman on the scouting trip, but he backed out at the last minute.
- † Catch-22 (1970, Paramount Pictures). Second-unit director John Jordan was killed when he was sucked out of a B-25 Mitchell while filming a bombing scene. He refused to wear a safety harness while the plane was in flight.
- † Golden Eagle (1970). Thai star Mitr Chaibancha was killed while starring as his popular character, the masked crime-fighter Insee Daeng (Red Eagle). On the final day of shooting, Mitr was required to grab a rope ladder hanging from a helicopter. However, he only managed to grab the lowest rung. Unaware of this, the helicopter pilot took off and Mitr finally lost his grip and fell to the ground. The accident was caught on film and appeared in the final theatrical release, but was removed from the DVD version.
- † Tora! Tora! Tora! (1970, 20th Century Fox). During aerial rehearsals prior to shooting in Oahu, Hawaii, a Vultee BT-13, modified to resemble a Japanese Val dive-bomber, crashed in a sugar-cane field in Ewa, killing pilot Guy Thomas Strong.
- † Zeppelin (1970). During aerial filming over the Irish Sea, a replica SE5 biplane and an Alouette helicopter camera-ship collided in mid-air. Assistant director Burch Williams (brother of producer Elmo Williams), cameraman Skeets Kelly and pilots Jim Liddy and Gilbert Chomat were all killed. None of the fatalities received screen credit or was memorialized by a dedication. Separately, German actor Peter Carsten was injured shooting bayonet scenes for the film.
- A Clockwork Orange (1971, Warner Bros.). During the film's pivotal brainwashing scene, Malcolm McDowell suffered a scratched cornea and temporary blindness from having his eyes propped open for so long. McDowell also suffered a broken rib in the scene in which an actor taunts and attacks him to demonstrate his rehabilitation.
- Kamen Rider (1971). During a scene for Episode 9 ("The Terrifying Cobra-Man"), lead actor Hiroshi Fujioka fractured his thighbone in a motorcycle stunt when he rode into a telephone pole at 50 mph (80 km/h), forcing him out of action. Due to the injury, producers had to use stock and unused footage, which was dubbed by Rokurō Naya, for the next four episodes, causing a dip in the ratings. Producers eventually had no choice but to substitute him with a second character played by Takeshi Sasaki. Fujioka made a return in Episode 53 ("Monster Jaguarman – Deathmatch by Motorcycle Fight"). As neither actor could be axed, the show ended up having two heroes.
- † Von Richthofen and Brown (1971). Stunt pilot Charles Boddington was killed during filming when the vintage biplane he was flying crashed at Weston Airport near Dublin. The following day, another aircraft crashed, injuring pilot Lynn Garrison and actor Don Stroud.
- † Matlock Police (1971 episode). During the filming of a pursuit-sequence for episode 36 ("End Of The Road"), a police vehicle driven by a Crawford Productions' principal actor struck and instantly killed a 21 year-old member of the camera crew, Colin Enor (or Ennor/Ennoh) after losing control while negotiating a gravel bend. The other crew managed to get out of the way.
- Deliverance (1972, Warner Bros.). Burt Reynolds injured his coccyx while canoeing.
- The Godfather (1972, Paramount Pictures). Gianni Russo broke two ribs and cracked his elbow after James Caan threw him over a fence and slammed a garbage can on him during a fight scene.
- † The Last Lion (1972). Sound technician James Chapman was mauled to death by a lion during production on this South African film.
- Napoleon and Samantha (1972, Disney). Jodie Foster (in her movie debut, as a young child) was mauled by a lion on the set. The event has since caused Foster to suffer from ailurophobia.
- † The Bell from Hell (1973). On the final day of shooting of this Spanish/French horror film, director Claudio Guerrin Hill died after falling from the bell tower for which he named his film. It is inconclusive whether he jumped or fell accidentally. Juan Antonio Bardem came in to take care of the post-production duties after Hill's death.
- † La Cloche Tibétaine (1973). On 18 June, during the filming of episode 4, "L'escadron d'or" ("The Golden Squadron"), of this French mini-series, actor Roger Delgado and two Turkish film technicians were killed when their car went off of the road and fell into a ravine. Delgado, who was known for his role as the Master in the British television series Doctor Who, was 55 at the time of his death.
- Enter the Dragon (1973, Warner Bros.). During a fight-scene, Robert Wall accidentally slashed Bruce Lee in the arm with a broken bottle. In an unrelated incident Lee legitimately kicked Wall during the re-shoot with such force that an extra broke his arm trying to catch Wall.
- The Exorcist (1973, Warner Bros.). Linda Blair suffered a spinal fracture due to a mechanical failure while filming a scene where her character Regan MacNeil levitates and thrashes violently. The fracture later developed into scoliosis years later after Blair reinjured her back during a motorcycle scene in another film. In addition, actress Ellen Burstyn seriously injured her back while filming a scene where she falls over backwards after her possessed daughter backhands her. The scene was left in the film. In other accidents, a carpenter on set lost a thumb and a lighting technician a toe.
- X-Factor (1973). Stuntman Patrick Madsen was seriously injured with broken vertebrae resulting in paralysis while doing a motorcycle stunt doubling William Shatner in Moses Lake, Washington.
- Jesus Christ Superstar (1973, Universal Studios). Director of Photography Alex Thomson was seriously injured falling from a camera rostrum early in production. He was replaced by Douglas Slocombe without any credit for footage already exposed. After being sidelined for a number of years to recuperate, he resumed his career picking up a 2002 Lifetime Achievement Award from the British Society of Cinematographers.
- Earthquake (1974, Universal Studios). Stuntman Bennie Dobbins suffered a concussion when knocked off his feet during the filming of a flood scene (which was used in the film). Multiple stunt people suffered minor injuries during filming of a crashing elevator.
- † Primal Man (1974). Actor and stunt performer Janos Prohaska, his son Robert and 34 others died in an airplane crash while filming this television series.
- Doctor Who (1975, BBC). During filming of the serial The Sontaran Experiment, actor Tom Baker slipped and fell on rocks, breaking his collarbone and being taken away by ambulance. Baker filmed the rest of his scenes with a neckbrace hidden under his costume with actor Terry Walsh doubling for Baker in the duel scene.
- † The Eiger Sanction (1975, Universal Studios). A number of accidents occurred during the filming of The Eiger Sanction. A 27-year-old English climber, David Knowles, who was a body double and photographer, was killed during a rock fall, and mountaineer Mike Hoover narrowly escaped with his life.
- The Great Waldo Pepper (1975, Universal Studios). During filming of the aerial scenes, experienced stunt pilot Frank Tallman managed to perform two planned crashes without injury. However, a third, accidental crash occurred while landing a Nieuport biplane, when a rudder bar broke at 400 feet, sending his aircraft nose-diving into a hill. Tallman survived, but suffered two cracked vertebrae, required 58 stitches. He took a two-week hiatus from filming.
- Carrie (1976). Actress P.J. Soles, who played Norma in the film, ended up with a ruptured eardrum after pressurized water from a hose sprayed her directly in the ear during the filming of the prom scene. She made a full recovery and director Brian de Palma decided to leave the shot in the movie.
- Hand of Death (1976). According to his book I Am Jackie Chan: My Life in Action, Jackie Chan was knocked unconscious when he did one of the stunts on this film.
- No Deposit, No Return (1976, Disney). Dale Van Sickel, first president of the Stuntmen Association, was driving a car that was supposed to go off the end of a wharf in the Disney film. Oil had been applied to the wharf to facilitate the stunt, but too much was put down. The car went out of control and hit an abutment. Van Sickel suffered brain damage, and remained disabled for the rest of his life. Before the accident, he had been semi-retired, only taking a few jobs a year "to keep from getting stale". His family sued Walt Disney Productions. Disney settled out of court and fired Van Sickel for the incident.
- The Omen (1976, 20th Century Fox). Gregory Peck accidentally slammed a car door on the hand of Guglielmo Spoletini, who portrayed the Italian taxi driver. According to Bloody Disgusting, Spoletini's finger was almost amputated.
- The Don Lane Show (1976 episode). Australian stuntman Grant Page while demonstrating on a live-to-air TV variety show his technique for rolling up a car bonnet and being ricocheted off the roof, mistimed the stunt and was struck by a car approaching 60 kph. His body was caught by the broken windshield and he fell briefly stunned to the ground, sustaining superficial injuries. On the following night's show he explained to the audience what went wrong. Seven years later he returned to the same program and successfully performed that stunt.
- A Bridge Too Far (1977, United Artists). Stuntman Alf Joint was seriously injured while performing a stunt in which he jumped off a roof. Joint said of the experience that he felt he was being "pushed". In addition, special effects director John Richardson and his assistant Liz Moore were involved in a car crash which killed Moore. Both the crash and Joint's injury are alleged to have been attributed by the "curse" of the 1976 film The Omen, in which Joint and Richardson also participated.
- † Hi-Riders (1977). Stuntman Vic Rivers was killed when he drove his 1950s Ford F100 off a bridge via a ramp into a river on the Paramount ranch. He exited the vehicle but passed out upon exiting the Ford. He drowned before assistance reached him.
- † Joyride (1977). Cameraman Charles A. Parkinson Jr. was killed when, while leaning out of a car window during a chase scene, the vehicle unintentionally rolled over.
- Days of Our Lives (1977 episode). After making only three appearances on the long-running soap opera, the veteran actress Paula Raymond accidentally tripped on a telephone cord and broke her ankle, and so her character was abruptly written out of the show.
- Attack of the Killer Tomatoes (1978). The Hiller UH-12 helicopter crash involving Jack Riley and George Wilson was entirely unintentional, but having not been seriously injured, both actors continued by ad-libbing the rest of the scene, and ultimately it was included in the film.
- † Comes a Horseman (1978). Filming the scene where Jason Robards' character is dragged (presumably) to his death, his stunt double Jim Sheppard was killed when a horse that was dragging him veered from its course and caused him to hit his head on a fence post. The scene made it into the film, although it was cut right before the horse passed through the gate that killed Sheppard.
- Grease (1978, Paramount Pictures). During the filming of the "prom" scene, several cast members, including Michael Tucci, came down with heat-related illnesses during filming in the gym, which lacked windows in a room that reportedly reached up to 116 °F (47 °C). Another incident during the "Grease Lightning" scene left Jeff Conaway on opioids, after he fell and mildly injured his back.
- Convoy (1978). During the filming of the car jump, Bob Herron, due to pilot error, accelerated the car he was jumping (while doubling Ernest Borgnine) out of control thus hitting the roof of the barn that he only was supposed to hit the wall of the building. This resulted in injuries to Herron in the form of separated ribs and a concussion.
- Invasion of the Body Snatchers (1978). While filming a scene of his character running, Donald Sutherland was struck by a car.
- Snake in the Eagle's Shadow (1978). Actor Hwang Jang Lee knocked out one of Jackie Chan's teeth after kicking him in the face during a fight scene. Chan's arm was also slashed by a sword that was supposed to be blunt, but the camera kept rolling as he was screaming in pain.
- † Superman (1978, Warner Bros.). On 7 January 1978, metal worker and stunt performer Terry Hill was crushed to death by a wing of an Air Force One replica that snapped off and fell on him. The film's credits is dedicated to his memory. Jeff East, who plays young Clark Kent, tore some of his thigh muscles while filming the scene of him running along with the train in Smallville. Stunt performer Paul Weston and several actors had also been injured when the cheap wire suspension system failed.
- † Centennial (1978). On November 27, 1978, guest actor Richard Kelton died on location south of Denver after one day of shooting his scenes. His death was the result of accidental carbon monoxide asphyxiation due to improper ventilation in his dressing room trailer. Universal Studios, which produced the mini-series, was only fined $720 for the failure to provide a proper ventilation system for the trailer where Kelton was rehearsing his lines. His wife received a $50,000 settlement per a statute in California Workers Compensation Law and his role was recast.
- Apocalypse Now (1979). In the film's opening scene, Martin Sheen cut his hand after smashing a mirror; he was too drunk to realize that his hand was streaming in blood. During filming on March 5, 1977, Sheen suffered a heart attack. He returned to the set six weeks later.
- Charlie's Angels (1979, Columbia Pictures). While filming the episode "Angel in a Box" at Indian Dunes in Valencia, California on January 3, 1979, stuntman Bobby Bass was high on cocaine while driving a car that stuntwomen Julie Ann Johnson and Jeannie Coultar were supposed to jump out of. Bass drove faster than instructed, causing Coultar to suffer multiple injuries and a concussion. Johnson sustained more serious injuries; though unconscious, Johnson was writhing on the ground. Stunt coordinator Ronnie Rondell Jr. had to pin her down to stop the chance of her further injuring herself.
- CHiPs (1979, Metro-Goldwyn-Mayer). While filming an episode, Erik Estrada lost control of his motorcycle and was hurled into a parked car before the 900-pound (410 kg) vehicle landed on him. Estrada sustained fractured ribs, partially collapsed lungs, a fractured right wrist, and a cracked sternum and clavicle.
- † Revenge (1979). Director Gordon Parks, Jr., cameraman Peter Gilfillian, and two others were killed in a plane crash while filming in Kenya.
- † Steel (1979). A.J. Bakunas died doubling for George Kennedy in a fall from the Kincaid Towers in Lexington, Kentucky. Bakunas had successfully performed a fall from the ninth floor of the construction site, but when he learned that Dar Robinson had broken his record high fall for a non-film-related publicity stunt, Bakunas returned to perform the fall from the top of the 300-foot (91 m) construction site. Bakunas performed the fall expertly, but the airbag split and he was killed.

== 1980s ==
- † The Dukes of Hazzard (1980, Warner Bros.). Assistant cameraman Rodney Mitchell was killed and 12 other crew members were injured when their GMC camera truck flipped while rehearsing a chase scene. The dirt road was made more rough by rain the previous night.
- † Kolilakkam (1980). Indian actor Jayan was killed during a stunt scene when the helicopter he was boarding crashed.
- † Magnum, P.I. (1980, Universal Studios). Cameraman Rob Van Der Kar was killed in a helicopter crash while filming an episode.
- That's Incredible! (1980). On 6 July, stunt motorcyclist Steve Lewis suffered extensive foot and knee injuries while attempting to jump over two cars speeding toward him at over 100 mph (160 km/h). On 15 September, while performing a 170-foot (52 m) jump over the fountains of Caesars Palace in Las Vegas, Nevada, stunt motorcyclist Gary Wells missed the landing ramp and crashed into a parking lot wall. He sustained a tear in the main artery of his heart, along with broken legs, a fractured pelvis, and a concussion. In addition, six spectators were injured when a 15-foot (4.6 m) section of the wall gave way upon impact.
- Das Boot (1981). While filming a scene in which the U-96 is caught in a storm, actor Jan Fedder lost his footing and was nearly swept off the conning tower set. Actor Bernd Tauber noticed Fedder was suddenly missing and cried out, "Mann-über-Bord!" ("Man overboard!"). With the cameras still rolling, Tauber helped him to the conning tower hatch. Before realizing it was an accident, director Wolfgang Petersen said, "Good idea, Jan. We'll do that one more time!". Fedder was hospitalized and his role was partially rewritten so that he was bed-ridden for a short portion of the film. The footage was developed and the scene in which Fedder's character is nearly swept off the submarine was included in the film.
- The Cannonball Run (1981). In a scene where the silver Aston Martin DB5 was driving, the DB5 collided with a Ford Club Wagon in the passenger side. It is stated that the DB5 didnt have a suitable passenger seat, which led to stuntwoman Heidi von Beltz being thrown from the vehicle. This left her a quadriplegic. She died in October 2015, 35 years after the accident, aged 59.
- † The Five of Me (1981). Camera assistant Jack Tandberg was killed when he was struck by a driverless stunt car during the filming of this made-for-television film.
- † For Your Eyes Only (1981, United Artists). While filming a high-speed chase in the bobsleigh run, the four-man bobsled came out of the run at the wrong place and hit a tree. One of its occupants, a young stuntman named Paolo Rigon, was killed. In the scene where James Bond and Melina Havelock are dragged across the ocean, the stunt doubles for both characters suffered cuts and lacerations when their backs scraped against the coral reef in the Bahamas.
- Roar (1981). A film about a wildlife preservationist whose family comes to visit him only to be met with his co-habitants: his vast collection of wild animals. The film's cast and crew and actors suffered several accidents involving the film's animal cast, leaving over 70 of them injured including cinematographer Jan de Bont, who had his scalp lifted by a lion, resulting in 220 stitches. Lead actress Tippi Hedren fractured her leg and also had scalp wounds after being bucked off by an elephant while she was riding in it, in addition to being also bitten in the neck by a lion and required 38 stitches. Melanie Griffith (Hedren's daughter) was also attacked, receiving 50 stitches to her face. Because of the injuries on set, crew turnover was high as many never returned to the set. John Marshall was bitten by one of the lions and required 56 stitches.
- † The Sword and the Sorcerer (1981). Stuntman Jack Tyree was killed while doing a high-fall stunt at Griffith Park in Los Angeles. While performing a 78-foot (24 m) fall in heavy costume and makeup, Tyree fell short of his airbag, resulting in a fatal impact.
- † Skyflying stunt (1981). On April 1,1981, in Puʻunene, Hawaii, Australian stuntman Jim Bailey attempted to hang glide on the underside of a single-engine airplane, but upon takeoff, his safety harness snapped, leaving him dangling under the front landing gear about 500 feet above ground before falling to his death.
- † Race for the Yankee Zephyr (1981). Due to misreading a closing credit dedication to 3 names who died in connection with the film and while operating jetboats, it has been wrongly assumed that there was a triple fatality boating accident during filming on the Kawarau River in New Zealand. However, contemporary local news reports make clear that only one boat driver, Bill Clarke, drowned during a practice run, from which another passenger, Colin Robinson, survived that capsizing. However, 6 months later he too died in another jetboat crash on the same river, but unrelated to the film. Similarly, crew member John Rillstone (in his twenties) suffered a severe asthma attack during production in an isolated location.
- Blade Runner (1982, The Ladd Company). Daryl Hannah chipped her elbow in eight places during a scene where she accidentally slipped on the pavement and smashed the window of a parked car.
- Conan the Barbarian (1982, 20th Century Fox). Actress Sandahl Bergman was filming a sword fight when her finger was almost severed; Bergman was rushed to hospital, where the finger was successfully reattached.
- First Blood (1982). Performing many of his own stunts, Sylvester Stallone consequently suffered numerous serious injuries, broken ribs after the jumping off the cliff and landing on tree branches stunt for the scene where John Rambo is pursued by Deputy Art Galt (Jack Starrett), severe bruising after filming several takes of the jail scene where Galt clubbed Rambo with a nightstick, and nearly lost his thumb from a gunfire squib filming the scene where Rambo eludes guards in the abandoned mine shaft. In addition, the stunt driver for Brian Dennehy, Bennie E. Dobbins, suffered a lumbar compression fracture, after performing a stunt in a police car that was eventually not included in the final film. Dobbins would die from a heart attack in 1988 while filming Red Heat.
- † Fitzcarraldo (1982). The production of this West German film was affected by the numerous injuries and deaths of several indigenous extras who were hired as laborers, as well as two plane crashes that resulted in five critical injuries and one paralysis. A Peruvian logger was forced to amputate his own foot after being bitten by a venomous snake.
- Pink Floyd – The Wall (1982). During the filming of the scene for the song "One of My Turns", in which the main character tears apart his hotel room, Bob Geldof injured his left hand while ripping off pieces of a wooden closet door; he can be seen briefly looking at his hand. Later in the scene, he is then seen with a shirt wrapped around his hand.
- † World War III (1982). During filming for this made-for-TV movie, director Boris Sagal was fatally injured when his skull was fractured as he walked into the tail rotor blade of a helicopter.
- † Untitled Australian TV commercial (1982). Cameraman Garry Hansen and two others were killed in a helicopter crash.
- Coolie (1983). While filming a fight scene with Puneet Issar, Amitabh Bachchan was critically injured when he jumped over a table and the corner of the table struck his abdomen, resulting in a splenic rupture and blood loss. Filming was delayed for several months for Bachchan to recover from his injury.
- † High Road to China (1983). During filming in Yugoslavia, a helicopter crashed en route to location. All three on board - pilot Nigel Thornton, stunt pilot David Perrin and mechanic Jaron Anderson–were killed in the crash.
- † Midnite Spares (1983). Focus-puller David Brostoff was killed when, during filming of a motor-race scene at Granville, Australia, one of the sprint-cars swerved off the track and struck him, driving his body through two fences. The filmmakers were criticized for a lack of a proper stunt coordinator at the scene and for allowing non-stunt drivers to drive at race-speed.
- † Peterborough Jump (1983). On 5 September 1983, Canadian stuntman Ken Carter attempted to jump a pond in Peterborough, Ontario, with a rocket-powered Pontiac Firebird. He overshot the target landing ramp and was killed when his car crashed on its roof.
- † The Right Stuff (1983). Stuntman Joseph Leonard Svec died while performing a parachute jump that recreated Chuck Yeager's escape from a stalling NF-104. In real life, Yeager's flight helmet had caught fire on colliding with the ejection seat's heated exhaust in mid-air. Svec carried a smoke canister during his freefall to simulate such fire. However, this may have intoxicated the stuntman, causing him to lose consciousness. He failed to open his parachute and fell to his death.
- Scarface (1983, Universal Studios). Production was stalled for two weeks because Al Pacino accidentally burned his hand by holding a barrel of a gun that had been fired.
- † Twilight Zone: The Movie (1983, Warner Bros.). On July 23, 1982, two children, Myca Dinh Le (aged 7) and Renee Shin-Yi Chen (aged 6), and actor Vic Morrow were killed by a helicopter during production when pyrotechnics struck the tail rotor, causing the helicopter to spin out of control. Morrow and Le were struck by the main rotor and Chen was crushed under the helicopter. The accident led to director John Landis's trial on involuntary manslaughter charges, of which he was acquitted, one of the most prolonged lawsuits in film history; it also led to major changes in filming codes.
- City Heat (1984, Warner Bros.). Burt Reynolds suffered a broken jaw after being hit on the face with a metal chair while filming a fight scene. The injury left him restricted to a liquid diet; he lost 30 lb (14 kg) by the time filming wrapped.
- Indiana Jones and the Temple of Doom (1984, Paramount Pictures). In June 1983, while filming in London, Harrison Ford herniated a disc in his back, forcing him to fly back to Los Angeles for an operation. He returned six weeks later.
- The Fall Guy (1984, 20th Century Fox). Larry Holt was driving a jeep and froze when the jeep did not turn over. He ran over one group of crew people then swerved and ran over a second set of crew people. No one was killed but ten people were injured. "The jeep just kept barrelling along toward a grove of trees where Mickey Gilbert (the stunt coordinator) was standing,' cinematographer James Roberson said. 'The jeep hit Mickey, kept going and plowed into the crowd.' The jeep then plowed into a second set of people. The victims were taken from the accident scene, about 30 miles north of downtown Los Angeles, to two area hospitals, with three suffering more serious injuries being taken to Holy Cross Hospital.The three most seriously injured were Frank Crawford, 55, of Los Angeles, with a fractured pelvis and femur; Peter Van Cyl, 23, of Cypress, with a lacerated thigh and scalp; and Robert Mallerry, 37, of Simi Valley, with a chest injury. The accident was covered up by the stuntmen who were sent out in investigate the pilot error accident and was reported to the media incorrectly.
- † Cover Up (1984). While waiting for an episode filming to resume, actor Jon-Erik Hexum played Russian roulette with a .44 Magnum loaded with a blank. The gunshot fractured his skull and caused massive cerebral hemorrhaging when bone fragments were forced through his brain. He was rushed to Beverly Hills Medical Center, where he was pronounced brain dead.
- Dune (1984). Jürgen Prochnow suffered first- and second-degree burns to his face while filming a scene where his character lay unconscious and spewed green gas from his torn cheek. To achieve this effect, a tube connected to a pump was attached to a prosthetic cheek over Prochnow's face. However, a malfunction caused heat to build up inside the fake cheek and spill near-molten goo on Prochnow's face once it was torn open.
- Pepsi commercial (1984). While Michael Jackson was filming a television commercial with his siblings at the Shrine Auditorium in Los Angeles, a faulty pyrotechnic went off too early and set his hair on fire, inflicting second- and third-degree burns to his scalp and body. Jackson sued PepsiCo for damages and received a US$1.5 million settlement, which he donated to the Brotman Medical Center in Culver City, California, to establish the Michael Jackson Burn Center for Children. This accident resulted in Jackson's addiction to painkillers and obsession with plastic surgery until his death in 2009.
- † Airwolf (1985). Stuntman Reid Rondell was killed in a helicopter crash.
- Police Story (1985). During the film's famous pole-sliding scene, Jackie Chan suffered third-degree burns on his hands, nearly broke the seventh and eighth vertebrae on his spine, dislocated his pelvis, and was nearly paralyzed. Also, in the scene where Jackie Chan stops a double-decker bus, the actors were supposed to be thrown through the front window of the second level and land on a car below, but instead they landed on the hard surface of the road, missing the car. The scene still went into the film.
- † Rambo: First Blood Part II (1985, Paramount Pictures). During filming in Acapulco, Mexico, special effects man Clifford Wenger Jr. was killed by one of the film's explosions, where he lost his footing and fell to his death. He was submerged underwater for more than five minutes before the crew could retrieve his body.
- Rocky IV (1985, United Artists). Demanding a sense of realism in the boxing match between Rocky Balboa and Ivan Drago, Sylvester Stallone and Dolph Lundgren agreed to legitimately spar with each other. Stallone was airlifted from Canada to St. John's Hospital in Santa Monica, California, and placed on intensive care for eight days after Lundgren delivered a hard punch to his chest, causing his heart to swell and his blood pressure to exceed 200.
- † Runaway Train (1985). During filming in Alaska, a helicopter en route to location struck power lines and crashed, killing pilot Rick Holley.
- Armour of God (1986). During the filming of a scene in which Jackie Chan jumped from a wall to a tree branch, the branch snapped off and Chan fell 15 feet to the ground below. He hit his head on a rock, causing part of his skull to crack and a fragment to lodge in his brain. He now has a plastic plug in a permanent hole in his skull and hearing-loss in the right ear and has since called this stunt "the closest (he) had ever come to death."
- † Vendetta dal futuro (Hands of Steel, 1986). During filming of the Italian sci-fi action film in Arizona, a helicopter attempted to fly beneath the Navajo Bridge but crashed, killing the pilot Dan Nasca and Italian actor Claudio Cassinelli.
- Maximum Overdrive (1986). Director of photography Armando Nannuzzi was seriously injured when a radio-controlled lawnmower used in a scene went out of control and struck a block of wood used as a camera support, shooting out wood splinters. The splinters were fired at Nannuzzi's face, resulting in him losing an eye. Nannuzzi sued Stephen King on 18 February 1987, for $18 million in damages due to unsafe working practices. The suit was settled out of court.
- † Top Gun (1986, Paramount Pictures). On September 16, 1985, aerobatic pilot Art Scholl crashed his Pitts S-2 camera-plane off the southern Californian coast near Carlsbad. Neither the aircraft nor Scholl's body were ever recovered.
- † The Wraith (1986). During filming of a car-chase scene in the low-budget sci-fi action film in Arizona, assistant cameraman Bruce Ingram was killed and seven other were injured when an overloaded camera car crashed on a mountain road. Crew members were thrown off the vehicle sending them on all directions.
- Full Metal Jacket (1987, Warner Bros.). Actor Vincent D'Onofrio, who had deliberately increased his weight to 280 lb (130 kg) to play the overweight U.S. Marine Corps recruit Leonard Lawrence (Pvt. Pyle), twisted his knee during filming of the boot-camp scenes, injuring it severely. D'Onofrio required surgical reconstruction.
- The Princess Bride (1987). Cary Elwes lost consciousness and gained a laceration on his head during a scene where his character gets hit on the head by Count Rugen. Frustrated by Christopher Guest's reluctance to hit him properly to invoke a desired reaction, Elwes instructed him to hit him harder, which he did. Elwes was hospitalized for a day, causing production to be suspended until he made a full recovery. The take of Cary Elwes being knocked out for real is shown in the final cut. He also suffered a broken toe in an accident while messing around in an ATV that was owned by co-star André the Giant.
- † The Late, Late Breakfast Show (1986). On 13 November 1986, volunteer Michael Lush was killed during a live stunt rehearsal as part of the "Give It a Whirl" segments. The stunt, called "Hang 'em High", involved bungee jumping from an exploding box suspended from a 120-foot (37 m) high crane. The carabiner clip attaching his bungee rope to the crane sprang loose from its eyebolt during the jump. He died instantly upon impact of multiple injuries, and The Late, Late Breakfast Show was cancelled two days later.
- † Million Dollar Mystery (1987). Stuntman Dar Robinson died in a motorcycle accident after a dangerous stunt had been filmed and the medics on the set had been dismissed. Robinson, famous for his jumps off Toronto's CN Tower, drove his motorcycle off a cliff, impaling him on a tree branch causing fatal injuries.
- † The Squeeze (1987). Veteran stuntman Victor Magnotta drowned while performing a car stunt in which he drove the vehicle off a Hoboken pier and plunged into the Hudson River. He was pinned in the car, and could not escape before drowning.
- The Untouchables (1987, Paramount Pictures). While filming the first take of the scene when his character is riddled with bullets from Frank Nitti (Billy Drago)'s tommy gun, Sean Connery caught dust in his eye and had to be hospitalized. Film director Brian De Palma recalled having to beg Connery to do a second take of the scene.
- † Braddock: Missing in Action III (1988). On location in the Philippines, a helicopter hired by the Cannon Group crashed into Manila Bay, killing four Filipino soldiers who were working as extras and wounding five other people on the ground. This helicopter accident occurred the same day the "not guilty" Twilight Zone verdict was handed down in a Los Angeles Superior Court.
- Die Hard (1988, 20th Century Fox). Bruce Willis lost two-thirds of his hearing in his left ear after firing a gun loaded with extra-loud blanks from underneath a table.
- Halloween 4: The Return of Michael Myers (1988). While filming a rooftop scene, Ellie Cornell accidentally slipped and her torso was cut by a large nail. She lost a large amount of blood but recovered, going on to continue on with the film.
- The Price Is Right (1988). During a June 1988 episode taping, a camera hit game show model Janice Pennington, knocking her unconscious. Her resulting surgery left her with scars and one shoulder shorter than the other; as a result, she could no longer wear swimsuits on the show.
- † Red Heat (1988, TriStar Pictures). Stuntman and director Bennie Dobbins suffered a fatal heart attack while filming a fight scene in freezing conditions outdoors in Austria. The scene required Arnold Schwarzenegger and another actor to fight near-naked in deep snow. Dobbins over-exerted himself trying to install fan heaters in the snow to prevent the actors suffering hypothermia.
- The Abyss (1989, 20th Century Fox). Actor Ed Harris almost drowned during an underwater sequence. Despite him yelling "Cut" when he ran out of air, the production crew did not give him oxygen until he passed out. The trauma caused him to break down in his car on the way home.
- Back to the Future Part II (1989, Universal Studios). During a "hoverboard" stunt scene, stuntwoman Cheryl Wheeler-Dixon was accidentally bounced off a pillar before falling 30 feet onto concrete, sustaining serious facial and wrist injuries.
- Cyborg (1989). While filming, Jackson "Rock" Pinckney lost an eye during filming when Jean-Claude Van Damme accidentally struck him with a prop knife. Pinckney sued Van Damme in a North Carolina court and was awarded $487,500.
- † Gone in 60 Seconds 2 (1989, unfinished). Director and actor H. B. Halicki was killed in Buffalo, New York, when a water tower he was planning to topple fell prematurely, hitting a telephone pole that then fatally struck him in the head. The film was scrapped as a result of the accident.
- The Karate Kid Part III (1989, Columbia Pictures). Actor Sean Kanan suffered internal bleeding after doing 20 takes of being thrown out a door and landing on his stomach. He collapsed at a Las Vegas hotel four days after shooting the scene and was discovered to have two quarts of blood pooled in his abdomen.
- † The Return of the Musketeers (1989). On 20 September 1988, British character actor Roy Kinnear suffered a broken pelvis in a horseback riding accident and died of a heart attack the following day.
- † The Sword of Tipu Sultan (1989). The largest number of on-set deaths in film history took place during the filming of this Indian made-for-TV movie. A total of 62 extras and crew members died after a fire broke out and they were trapped inside the burning film studio. Director and star Sanjay Khan suffered major burns and spent 13 months in hospital, undergoing 72 operations.

== 1990s ==
† indicates accidents and/or incidents resulting in death.

- † Hired To Kill (1990). Stuntman Clint Carpenter was killed and three others and the pilot were injured in a helicopter crash in Corfu, Greece.
- Back to the Future Part III (1990, Universal Studios). In the scene where Buford "Mad Dog" Tannen and his gang hang Marty McFly, Michael J. Fox lost consciousness from asphyxiation. After a few seconds, an extra realized he was being asphyxiated and the noose was lowered. Fox recounted this event in his autobiography, Lucky Man.
- † Delta Force 2: The Colombian Connection (1990). Five people were killed in a helicopter crash during filming in the Philippines. The fatalities were pilot Jojo Imperiale, actor Geoff Brewer, cameraman Gadi Danzig, key grip Mike Graham and gaffer Don Marshall.
- † Suburban Commando (1991). Special effects technician Michael Colvin died on set in 1990 while testing a trap door.
- † Bikini Island (1991). Stuntman Jay C. Currin was killed on the first day of filming during a stunt fall off a 55-foot (17 m) cliff, when he landed on some rocks instead of the airbag that had been placed to break his fall.
- Highlander II: The Quickening (1991). Christopher Lambert and Michael Ironside both suffered injuries during filming. Lambert chipped one of Ironside's teeth during a fight scene, while Ironside inadvertently severed part of Lambert's finger during a sword-fight scene.
- Terminator 2: Judgment Day (1991). Linda Hamilton suffered permanent hearing damage in one ear during filming when she fired a gun inside an elevator without using her ear plugs. She also injured her knees from falling on the ground during multiple re-shoots of her character being hit with a nightstick by actor Ken Gibbel. Frustrated by Gibbel's refusal to hit her properly, Hamilton knocked him unconscious with a broom handle during the escape scene. Arnold Schwarzenegger nearly broke some fingers while twirling his shotgun with one hand. While there was a shotgun with a lever loop lengthened to fit Schwarzenegger's hand, he mistakenly picked up a standard-sized unit and injured his hand while attempting the stunt.
- † The Bodyguard (1992, Warner Bros.). A worker died when he was crushed between two lighting cranes during filming.
- Patriot Games (1992, Paramount Pictures). While filming the climactic speedboat fight scene, Sean Bean sustained a gash above his left eyebrow after Harrison Ford struck him with a metal hook.
- Wind (1992). Australian stuntman Chris Anderson required a leg amputation below the knee after a 30-foot (9.1 m) yacht collided with the jet-boat on which Anderson was eating his lunch during a break in filming.
- † 999 (1993). While recreating a real-life near-fatal parachute incident in which a parachutist tangled his equipment with the aircraft's landing gear before freeing himself, veteran stuntman Tip Tipping leapt out of a Cessna and crashed into woods near Ellingham, Northumberland. He was pronounced dead when medical staff arrived.
- Super Mario Bros. (1993, Touchstone Pictures). Bob Hoskins was stabbed four times, was electrocuted, and nearly drowned. During one scene, Hoskins broke a finger when the door of a van slammed on his hand, and he had to wear a cast for the rest of the shoot. Hoskins described the film as the worst movie he ever made.
- Crime Story (1993). Jackie Chan's legs were crushed between two cars during a dangerous stunt scene.
- The Fugitive (1993, Warner Bros.). Harrison Ford damaged some ligaments in his leg while filming a chase scene in the woods. Because he refused to have surgery until filming was wrapped, his character, Dr Richard Kimble, walked with a limp throughout the film.
- Gettysburg (1993, New Line Cinema). During filming of the battle scenes on Little Round Top, Bradley Egen, an extra playing a Union soldier, was unintentionally struck in the head by the butt of a musket and suffered a mild concussion.
- Sliver (1993). Cameraman Michael Benson suffered lung injuries after a helicopter crash left him trapped for two days inside a Hawaiian volcano crater. The crew aboard the helicopter was flying over an active volcano to shoot the film's original opening sequence, but the footage was lost in the crash, requiring that the film's ending be rewritten.
- † The Crow (1994). On 31 March 1993, American actor and martial artist Brandon Lee was accidentally shot and killed in North Carolina with a .44 magnum when the gun's barrel contained a piece of a fake bullet that was left behind. The gun was loaded with the blanks. The blank propelled the broken piece of plastic into Brandon Lee. Also, on 1 February 1993, the opening day of filming, a carpenter was severely shocked and burned when his scissor lift struck power lines.
- Friends (1994, Warner Bros.). In the Season 3 episode "The One Where No One's Ready", Matt LeBlanc dislocated his shoulder leaping into a chair. The injury required LeBlanc to wear a sling, temporarily postponing production of the episode and requiring the injury to be written into the show for the following two episodes.
- † L.A. Heat (1995). Stuntman Paul Dallas died when he missed the airbag for a 53-foot fall.
- Mortal Kombat (1995, New Line Cinema). There were a few injuries to the lead actors when filming commenced. During filming of the battle between Liu Kang and Reptile, actor Robin Shou fractured his ribs after multiple takes of hitting a pillar. Actress Bridgette Wilson also got injured, dislocating her shoulder while performing a stunt; she was quickly able to continue working when paramedics put it back into place. Actor Linden Ashby recalled urinating blood after being kicked in the kidney.
- Rumble in the Bronx (1995). Jackie Chan injured his right leg while performing a stunt where he jumps onto a boat. He spent much of the remaining shooting time with one leg in a cast. When it came to the film's climax, the crew colored a sock to resemble the shoe on his good foot, which Chan wore over his cast. Lead actress Françoise Yip and several stunt doubles were also injured during the shooting of a motorcycle stunt, with several people suffering broken limbs and ankles.
- Seven (1995). In a scene where Detective David Mills (Brad Pitt) chases John Doe in the rain, Pitt fell and his arm went through a car windshield, requiring surgery. This accident was written into the script to explain Pitt wearing a cast over his arm. Coincidentally, the original script did call for Pitt's character to be injured during this sequence (but not to his hand). Morgan Freeman also injured his ankle while filming a scene.
- † Vampire in Brooklyn (1995). Angela Bassett's stunt-double Sonja Davis fell to her death in a stunt gone wrong. Her death led to a $50 million wrongful-death lawsuit against Paramount Pictures.
- Waterworld (1995, Universal Studios). During production, actresses Jeanne Tripplehorn and Tina Majorino were thrown overboard from the trimaran they were on when its bowsprit snapped. Nearly a dozen rescue divers jumped in and brought them back on board. Kevin Costner nearly died when he was caught in a squall while tied to the mast of his trimaran. In addition, several cast and crew members suffered from seasickness and jellyfish stings. Costner's stunt double, Laird Hamilton, was lost at sea for a few hours when his jet ski ran out of fuel after the filming of a scene.
- Ah Kam (1996). In October 1995, actress Michelle Yeoh, who usually performs her own stunts, was seriously injured during shooting of the film about the life of a stuntwoman, when she misjudged an 18-foot (5.5 m) jump off a bridge onto a truck. She fractured a vertebra and was in traction for a month. The sequence can be seen at the end of the film.
- † Mountain Dew commercial (1996). On 14 December 1995, Rob Harris was filming a skydiving stunt, when his parachute system malfunctioned, and he fell 5,000 feet to his death in British Columbia.
- † Black & Decker commercial (1996). Veteran pilot Michael Tamburro died after suffering a broken neck and head injuries in a helicopter crash caused by hitting a main rotor blade on a rock on the side of a desert butte. Co-pilot Alan Purwin suffered a broken arm, and flying debris from the crash injured a crew member. Producers Propaganda Films had not obtained a permit to use a helicopter when filming, which the firm claimed was due to an oversight.
- † Love Serenade (1996). During the filming of a scene on a grain silo, stuntman Collin Dragsbaek, doubling actor George Shetsov, died when he fell onto a faulty airbag.
- Scream (1996, Miramax Films). Skeet Ulrich was accidentally stabbed by Neve Campbell's stuntwoman with the tip of an umbrella, in a place he previously had open heart surgery as a child. Ulrich was wearing a protective vest to protect himself from the umbrella stabs in the iconic fight scene, however the stuntwoman missed her mark on the second stab. This incident is left in the movie, meaning Ulrich's reaction and pain are all too real.
- † Con Air (1997, Touchstone Pictures). On 29 August 1996, Phil Swartz, a welder employed by LA-based Special Effects Unlimited was crushed to death at Wendover when a static model of the C-123 used in the film fell on him. The film credits end with "In Memory of Phil Swartz".
- † Sliders (1996). During the production of the "Desert Storm" episode of the television series Sliders near Victorville, California, actor Ken Steadman died, at age 27 in a dune-buggy accident between takes. He was moving a dune buggy to the next shooting location when it overturned and crushed him, killing him instantly.
- † Gone Fishin' (1997). Stuntwoman Janet Wilder was killed and four other people, including her husband, were injured when a speedboat driver misjudged a ramp and the speedboat landed in a crowd.
- Titanic (1997, Paramount Pictures). Several extras were injured during the film's climactic sinking scene where passengers fall and hit parts of the ship. Injuries ranged from a broken ankle to cracked ribs, a fractured cheekbone, and a ruptured spleen. Kate Winslet suffered hypothermia from filming the water scenes after she refused to wear a wetsuit under her dress. During the scene where Jack and Rose were running away from an ocean wave in the hallways, Winslet's coat snagged on a gate, pulling her down and nearly drowning her. On the final night of shooting in Nova Scotia, 80 cast and crew members were hospitalized after the clam chowder at the catering area was spiked with PCP.
- Blues Brothers 2000 (1998, Universal Studios). While filming a stunt scene, a car rolled onto two crew members, one of whom needed a leg amputation. Three months later, during filming for a car-crash sequence, stuntman Bob Minor suffered severe injuries to his head.
- † Galápagos: The Enchanted Voyage (1998). Noel Archambault, the film's camera operator/stereographer, was killed in an ultralight aircraft crash along with the pilot, William Raisner Jr., while filming in the Galápagos Islands. The men's bodies were found at an elevation of 3,000 feet on Cerro Azul, one of the two most active volcanoes in the archipelago.
- Mighty Joe Young (1998). Director of photography Don Peterman and camera operator Ray de la Motte were injured while preparing a crane shot in July 1997 in Thousand Oaks, California. Both suffered extensive neck and head injuries.
- † Pleasantville (1998). Cameraman Brent Hershman died when he fell asleep driving home after a 19-hour work day on the set of the film. Hershman's death resulted in a wrongful-death suit, claiming that New Line Cinema, New Line Productions and Juno Pix Inc. were responsible for the death as a result of the lengthy work hours imposed on the set, and spurred a call to limit filming hours.
- † Walker, Texas Ranger (1999, CBS). Stuntman William Charles Skeen suffered a fatal heart attack when the GMC Suburban in which he was riding in made a rough landing after hurtling 140 feet through the air in a state park. The landing of the vehicle broke all the axles.
- † On May 23, 1999, the World Wrestling Federation (now known as WWE) presented the pay per view event Over the Edge. Owen Hart, in character of his Blue Blazer gimmick, died when his rigging equipment malfunctioned and he fell over 78 feet from the rafters of the arena and into the ring, impacting chest first on the top rope before being thrown to the opposite side of the ring from the recoil of the ropes. The television audience did not see the accident. Although the show was halted for 20 minutes while the EMTs and doctors tried desperately to save him, he died shortly after the fall. The impact of the fall severed his aorta, and resulted in him bleeding to death internally within minutes.

== 2000s ==
† indicates accidents and/or incidents resulting in death.

- Cast Away (2000). While filming, Tom Hanks cut his leg. Two weeks later, the swelling on his leg persisted, and Hanks was confined to a hospital for three weeks to treat a staphylococcal infection that could have killed him from blood poisoning.
- Crouching Tiger, Hidden Dragon (2000). During a fight scene, Michelle Yeoh tore an ACL on her knee after a bad landing and had to be flown from China to Johns Hopkins Hospital in Baltimore, Maryland, for surgery.
- † The Crow: Stairway to Heaven (2000). A special-effects explosion went wrong during filming on 15 August 1998, when stuntman Marc Akerstream was struck on the head and killed by flying debris.
- † Dinosaur (2000). Crew member Matthew Gordy was killed and another seriously wounded when a camera boom struck a cross-country power line on February 25, 1998. Gordy's widow Krista Gordy later sued Disney and the firm that manufactured equipment involved in the accident; the former was fined $5,000 in April of 1998 by the California Division of Occupational Safety and Health.
- † I Dare You: The Ultimate Challenge (2000). Stuntman Michael Brady died while preparing his stunt equipment in Benson, Arizona. He accidentally slipped off a train boxcar and hit his head on the rocks below. Brady was in a coma for several days before being taken off life support.
- † Proof of Life (2000). David Morse's stand-in, Will Gaffney, was killed while riding on a truck that drove off a mountain road.
- † Taxi 2 (2000). A Peugeot 406 was supposed to land in a pile of cardboard after a stunt, but missed and hit several crew. Cameraman Alain Dutartre later died of internal injuries while his assistant Jean-Michel Bar broke both legs.
- † The X-Files (2000) Crew member Jim Engh was killed by electrocution when the scaffolding he was standing on came into contact with a high-tension power line. Six other crew members were injured in the accident, one critically.
- † Exit Wounds (2001). During filming in Hamilton, Ontario, a van was being towed along a street upside-down as part of a chase scene; stuntman Chris Lamon and another man were supposed to roll safely out, but Lamon struck his head, dying six days later.
- Pearl Harbor (2001). A stunt plane dressed like a Japanese fighter crashed during a flight over the movie set. The pilot survived the crash without serious injury.
- † The Messenger (2002). Russian actor and director Sergei Bodrov, Jr. and 42 film crew members were killed in the Kolka–Karmadon rock ice slide after finishing the second day of shooting on 20 September.
- Mr. Deeds (2002). Winona Ryder broke her arm in three places while filming the scene in which she and Adam Sandler ride bikes down a set of stairs.
- The Lord of the Rings: The Two Towers (2002). Viggo Mortensen broke two toes kicking a helmet; the take is used in the film. Orlando Bloom fell off a horse and broke three ribs. John Rhys-Davies' stunt double also dislocated one of his knees in another accident. Finally, while filming a battle sequence, Mortensen chipped a tooth and Bernard Hill's ear was slashed.
- † XXX (2002). On 4 April 2002, Vin Diesel's stunt double, Harry L. O'Connor, was killed during filming, in a scene where he was supposed to rappel down a parasailing line and land on a submarine. Instead, he struck a bridge at high speed and died immediately.
- The Hunted (2003). On June 14, 2001, Benicio del Toro broke his wrist while doing his own stuntwork.
- Ripley's Believe It or Not! (2003). While filming an episode near Kingman, Arizona, a filming-helicopter flew into a power line. David Gibbs, the helicopter pilot, had his pilot's license suspended for the accident. His family sued the company that made the show. In 2013, Gibbs would later be involved in another helicopter accident that killed him and two passengers.
- Video Option (2003). Whilst competing in the Silver State Classic Challenge, Daijiro Inada sustained a minor injury to his hip after his modified 800 bhp Nissan 350Z left the road and rolled over seven times following a tire blowout at about 210 mph (338 km/h). In addition to a misaligned tire setup which contributed to the blowout, he tried to downshift dropping into third gear at 149 mph (240 km/h), which caused the accident.
- † CrossBones (2004). On 14 August 2004, cinematographer Neal Fredericks was killed when the Cessna from which he was filming crashed near the Dry Tortugas off the coast of Florida. Although the director, pilot, and two other crew members were able to escape, Fredericks could not free himself from his harness and drowned.
- Kill Bill: Volume 2 (2004). While filming a driving scene in Mexico, Uma Thurman sustained a concussion and injured her knees when she lost control of the car and crashed into a palm tree.
- The Passion of the Christ (2004). In playing the role of Jesus Christ, Jim Caviezel sustained gashes to his back from multiple whippings, hypothermia, and a separated shoulder from carrying a giant cross. He was also struck by lightning before filming the Sermon on the Mount scene.
- The Phantom of the Opera (2004). A worker suffered severe injuries when he was thrown from scaffolding that was not properly secured on the set of the film. Actor Patrick Wilson fell off his horse approximately three times while filming his own stunt scene, riding the horse bareback. He also nearly drowned while filming the water scenes in the lake.
- The Punisher (2004) Kevin Nash was accidentally stabbed in the shoulder with a butterfly knife by co-star Thomas Jane when it was inadvertently switched with the prop knife intended for the scene.
- † Troy (2004). Brad Pitt, who played Achilles in the film, tore his left Achilles tendon during production. George Camilleri, a bodybuilding extra, broke his leg while filming an action sequence at Għajn Tuffieħa. He was operated on the following day but suffered complications and died two weeks later.
- Æon Flux (2005). Charlize Theron was performing backflips during filming and landed on her neck, herniating a disc close to her spinal cord. Production was shut down for eight weeks.
- Syriana (2005). During a torture scene where he was tied to a chair, George Clooney suffered head and spinal injuries and memory loss when he hit his head on the floor after the torturer knocked his chair over. The impact ruptured his dura mater, resulting in loss of cerebrospinal fluid. The injury was so painful that he has said he contemplated committing suicide while recovering.
- Casino Royale (2006). While filming a fight scene in Prague, Daniel Craig knocked out two of his front teeth. The damage was so severe that Craig's dentist had to be flown in from London to replace his teeth.
- Jackass Number Two (2006). During filming of the closing scene, Ryan Dunn was performing a stunt with Bam Margera in which both of them are pulled out of shot by a running horse with a rope tied around their feet. Dunn dropped straight onto his shoulder, causing damage to the muscles and leading to a life-threatening blood clot near his heart and brain. While recovering from that injury and lyme disease, Dunn fell into depression and reclusion, isolating himself for two years before returning to Jackass.
- † Ocean's Deadliest (2006). On 4 September 2006, Steve Irwin was fatally pierced in the chest by a stingray spine while snorkelling at the Great Barrier Reef, at Batt Reef, which is located off the coast of Port Douglas in north Queensland. Irwin was in the area filming the documentary, but weather had stalled filming. He decided to take the opportunity to film some shallow water shots for a segment in the television program his daughter Bindi was hosting when the ray suddenly turned and lashed out at him with the spine on its tail.
- Top Gear (2006). While filming a challenge for Series 9 Episode 1 in Yorkshire, Richard Hammond crashed a dragster at 288 mph (463 km/h), seriously injuring his brain. His front-right tyre failed on the seventh run that caused him to hit the grass and roll the Vampire he was driving. During the roll, Hammond's helmet embedded itself into the ground, flipping the visor up and forcing dirt into his mouth and left eye, damaging the eye. Rescuers felt a pulse and heard the unconscious Hammond breathing before the car was turned upright. Hammond also hurt his neck in the "Cheap Car Challenge" of Series 8 Episode 8 when his Suzuki Super Carry rolled over.
- † Wowowee (2006). A stampede occurred at PhilSports Football and Athletics Stadium, where the Philippine game show was filming its first anniversary episode. The stampede killed 73 people and injured 392 others. The incident is cited in the 2007 Guinness World Records as "the greatest death toll in a game show".
- Past Tense (2006). During the production of this Lifetime film, Gabrielle Carteris suffered from partial facial paralysis and a speech impediment from a scene where her character is choked and dragged down a flight of stairs by actor Adrian Hughes. She sued the film's producers for medical expenses, loss of earnings, and various damages.
- Charlie Wilson's War (2007). A 34 year-old special effects assistant was critically injured when a prop missile exploded, sustaining severe injuries to his face and head. Fire Captain Darren Moon said in the aftermath of the accident that a fire safety officer, whose presence is required by law during pyrotechnics work, was not present.
- Fifth Gear (2007). During the filming of Series 12, episode 7, presenter Tom Ford broke his foot and several toes when he crashed a modified Bedford Rascal van while recording a piece about drifting. BTCC driver Jason Plato suffered multiple burns when a Caparo T1 he was driving at Bruntingthorpe proving ground burst into flames.
- † The Final Season (2007). Cameraman Roland Schlotzhauer was killed during filming when the helicopter he was in hit power lines and crashed into a field. The helicopter pilot and one of the film's producers were seriously injured.
- Live Free or Die Hard (2007). Bruce Willis was injured during a fight scene when he was kicked above his right eye by Maggie Q's stunt double, who was wearing stiletto heels. Willis was hospitalized and received seven stitches that ran through his right eyebrow and down into the corner of his eye. Willis' stunt double Larry Rippenkroeger was knocked unconscious when he fell 25 feet (7.6 m) from a fire escape to the pavement. Rippenkroeger suffered broken bones in his face, several broken ribs, a punctured lung, and fractures in both wrists. Owing to his injuries, production was temporarily shut down. Willis personally paid the hotel bills for Rippenkroeger's parents and visited him a number of times at the hospital.
- † Time Team (2007). Re-enactor Paul Allen, 54, died in a jousting accident after a splinter from a broken lance penetrated his eye socket and lodged in his brain.
- † The Dark Knight (2008). Cameraman Conway Wickliffe was killed in 2007 on the set of The Dark Knight, as he rode in a pickup truck driving parallel to a stunt Batman Tumbler; the pickup missed a 90-degree turn and crashed into a tree, pinning his head between the tree and pickup. The crew tried to save Wickliffe's life after running to the scene, but his injuries were too severe.
- † Jumper (2008). Set dresser David Ritchie was crushed to death by frozen debris as an exterior set was being dismantled.
- Law & Order: Special Victims Unit (2008). While filming an action scene, Mariska Hargitay suffered a collapsed lung after landing wrongly, requiring multiple surgeries to correct the injury.
- † Red Cliff (2008/2009). While filming a scene in which a small boat was set on fire and was to ram a larger boat, the fire spread quickly out of control, killing stuntman Lu Yanqing and injuring six others.
- Valkyrie (2008). During filming, the side of a vintage truck detached as the vehicle turned a sharp corner, causing a number of extras on board to fall out. One man was seriously injured and 10 more suffered minor injuries. The extras involved later filed a lawsuit against the production.
- 63rd Tony Awards (2009). After performing the opening number with his band Poison, lead vocalist Bret Michaels was struck in the head by a descending set and knocked to the floor. He suffered a fractured nose and a split lip that required three stitches. Michaels subsequently sued the event's organizers, claiming that the collision led to his 2010 brain hemorrhage. The suit was settled in May 2012 for an undisclosed amount.
- G.I. Joe: The Rise of Cobra (2009). During an explosion-effects misfire, Sienna Miller's suit caught fire, igniting the area between her breasts.
- Nitro Circus (2009). Johnny Knoxville was attempting to do a back flip on a Moto X bike. Halfway into the rotation, he bailed and hit the ground hard. The bike landed on top of him and the handlebars hit his crotch, tearing his urethra. As a result, he had to flush his bladder periodically by means of a catheter. Knoxville said the process prevented scar tissue from forming. Motocross racer Jolene Van Vugt broke her wrist after coming short of a 65-foot (20 m) triple jump. She needed a metal plate attached with seven screws on her wrist and had to wear an arm-cast throughout the second season.
- The Tournament (2009). In a botched attempt to turn over a semi-trailer truck with an air cannon for a chase scene, a piece of iron debris flew toward the production crew and hit assistant director Shero Rauf, who broke both legs; he took almost two years to walk normally again.

== 2010s ==
† indicates accidents and/or incidents resulting in death.

- The Expendables (2010). Sylvester Stallone injured his neck while filming a fight scene with Steve Austin. He required a metal plate to be inserted into his neck during surgery. In 2024 Stallone stated that he required seven major surgeries after the accident, saying that "after that film, it was never physically the same."
- Harry Potter and the Deathly Hallows (2010/2011). During production at Leavesden, Daniel Radcliffe's stunt double David Holmes suffered a serious spinal injury during the filming of an aerial sequence, which left him a paraplegic. Holmes fell to the ground following an explosion that was part of the stunt.
- Lost (2010). While filming a fight scene for the series finale "The End", Terry O'Quinn mistakenly stabbed Matthew Fox with a real knife instead of a collapsible one. Fox's life was saved by the kevlar vest underneath his shirt.
- Unstoppable (2010). On November 21, 2009, a train being used in the film derailed in Bridgeport, Ohio. There were no injuries, but filming was delayed by one day.
- Wetten, dass..? (2010). In the 4 December episode of this German entertainment series, stuntman Samuel Koch attempted to powerbock over five moving cars in succession when his head hit the windshield of the fourth car (driven by his father), causing him to crash to the ground head-first, fracturing two vertebrae and rendering him quadriplegic.
- Top Gear: Middle East Special (2010). While helping fellow presenter Jeremy Clarkson tow his car from a ditch, presenter James May was knocked down by the tow rope. Upon landing, his head hit a rock, causing him to suffer from a severe concussion, and was hospitalized.
- † Campus PD (2011). Cameraman Greg Jacobsen was killed in a helicopter crash while filming at the Indiana University of Pennsylvania.
- The Eagle (2011). When filming in a freezing river, actors have a mixture of boiling hot water and river water poured down their suits to stay warm. A crew member forgot to mix the hot water with the river water during filming; as a result, Channing Tatum was scalded with boiling water that burned the skin off the tip of his penis.
- The Hangover Part II (2011). Australian stuntman Scott McLean suffered critical brain damage while filming in Bangkok after a taxi he was leaning out of the window of failed to dodge another vehicle, causing McLean's head to collide with it. Warner Bros. then issued a statement stating McLean was put into a medically induced coma, and were reportedly paying his hospital bills. McLean soon recovered, stating he had suffered "likely permanent brain and physical injuries" before suing the studio for unspecified damages.
- Transformers: Dark of the Moon (2011). An extra was seriously injured during a stunt in Hammond, Indiana. Owing to a failed weld, a steel cable snapped from a car being towed and hit the extra's car, damaging her skull. The extra, identified as Gabriela Cédillo, had to undergo brain surgery. The injury left her permanently brain-damaged and paralyzed on her left side, and her left eye was stitched shut. In May 2012, it was revealed that a $18 million settlement had been reached between Paramount and the Cédillo family. As a result of this accident, recycled footage from one of Michael Bay's previous movies, The Island, was used instead, with CG robots inserted into the footage.
- Agneepath (2012). Hrithik Roshan suffered numerous injuries during production. He sustained burns on his hands when Priyanka Chopra's lehenga caught fire. He suffered an eye injury from Holi colors thrown to his face during a musical scene. He also sustained a major back injury from lifting a 110 kg (240 lb) man during an action scene.
- The Avengers (2012). While performing a 30-foot (9.1 m) fall from a building, stuntman Jeremy Fitzgerald slammed into a pile of bricks and tore off a chunk of his scalp.
- Django Unchained (2012). During a tense argument scene, Leonardo DiCaprio smashed his hand on a table, inadvertently slicing his hand on a crystal cordial glass. Though the slice would require stitches after shooting the take, DiCaprio managed to continue on in character and even used the profuse bleeding as a prop. Director Quentin Tarantino chose to include this scene take in the final cut of the film.
- † The Expendables 2 (2012). While filming in Elin Pelin, Bulgaria, a stuntman was killed and another was left in critical condition during a staged explosion on a rubber boat. The surviving stuntman underwent a five-hour operation that reportedly left him in stable condition. In addition, both Sylvester Stallone and Arnold Schwarzenegger required shoulder surgery after filming.
- The Good Wife (2012). Kristin Chenoweth sustained a skull fracture, broken nose, spinal and rib injuries, and cracked teeth after a piece of the lighting rig fell on her, forcing her to require years of physical therapy.
- The Hobbit (2012–2014). As many as 27 animals were killed during the production of this film, mainly from the hazardous conditions of the farm they were housed in. Several goats and sheep fell into a sinkhole under the farm. One horse was hobbled and left on the ground for three hours. Another horse was killed after falling off an embankment of an overcrowded paddock. One horse had the skin and muscles of her leg torn off by wire fencing. Several chickens were mauled to death by unsupervised dogs or trampled by larger animals. This led to a global protest against the film by People for the Ethical Treatment of Animals (PETA).
- Nitro Circus: The Movie (2012). Mountain-biker and freestyle rider Jim DeChamp sustained a broken vertebra and severe head trauma as a result of a car stunt gone wrong.
- Premium Rush (2012). While filming in the streets of New York City, Joseph Gordon-Levitt lost control of his bicycle and collided with the back of a taxi before flying towards its rear windscreen. He required 31 stitches after his right forearm was slashed by the impact.
- The Sessions (2012). John Hawkes suffered a severe disc injury on his back. Hawkes has confirmed that his "spine now has not enough movement".
- Poseidon Rex (2013). In January 2013, actor Corin Nemec was involved in a boating accident while being transported to set by the Belizean Coast Guard. The boat ran into a semi-submerged barge, shattering the right side of his body. He required multiple blood transfusions to save his life, and underwent five surgeries.
- † Dangerous Flights (2013). On 24 February 2013, cameraman/director John Driftmier and conservationist Dr. Anthony King were killed in a plane crash in Kenya. Driftmier was shooting footage for the documentary when the plane, an Aeroprakt A-22L ultralight (registration 5Y-LWF) crashed into the east face of Mount Kenya. Although only a preliminary report has been published thus far, it is believed that a large downdraft forced the ultralight into an unrecoverable descent into the mountain. Driftmier and King were the only occupants.
- † G.I. Joe: Retaliation (2013). A crew member was killed while dismantling a set in New Orleans, Louisiana, when the scissor lift he was on tipped over, causing him to fall to his death.
- † Koh-Lanta (2013). In the 2013 season of this French survival program, contestant Gérald Babin, 25, died during the first day of filming in Cambodia on 22 March 2013. Babin had collapsed originally thought to be dehydration. The show doctor refused the contestant to be flown to hospital and so he was instead taken to a local infirmary. Babin was experiencing cramps but later was found to be in the midst of cardiac arrest, finally being airlifted to a hospital. The production company Adventure Line Productions and host Denis Brogniart denied that Babin’s treatment had been delayed because of shooting and said the production had nothing to do with his death. However fellow contestants have said that the on-site doctor, Thierry Costa, did not intervene for over 20 minutes. Costa committed suicide following the controversy. Production later resumed for Koh-Lanta: The New Edition.
- The Green Inferno (2013). Lorenza Izzo nearly drowned while filming the escape attempt sequence, where her character runs into the river near the village and is pushed downstream before being recaptured. It was not until one of the crew realized that her screams for help were real, that she was rescued. Some footage was kept in the final film.
- Kick-Ass 2 (2013). While filming a fight scene, Chloë Grace Moretz's stunt double suffered a head injury when she was thrown into a wall by Olga Kurkulina.
- † Lone Operator (2013, unaired). During filming of this planned Discovery Channel series, cameraman Darren Rydstrom, cast member Michael Donatelli, and pilot David Gibbs were killed in a helicopter crash in Acton, California. Gibbs was not authorized by the FAA to fly during the morning hours, and he had had his pilot's license suspended twice prior to the accident.
- † The Lone Ranger (2013). Crew member Michael Bridger drowned while cleaning a 24-foot-deep (7.3 m) water tank to be used in the film's underwater scene.
- Now You See Me (2013). While filming the water-chamber escape scene, Isla Fisher nearly drowned when her shackles got stuck in the grate below and she was stuck in the chamber for over two minutes.
- Nurse 3D (2013). During filming in Toronto, Paz de la Huerta was struck by a stunt driver in an ambulance. She suffered a broken tailbone and spinal fracture, which required more than 20 surgeries.
- Thor: The Dark World (2013). Jaimie Alexander suffered severe injuries when she slipped off a metal staircase during a rainy morning on the set. The fall caused her to slip a disc in her thoracic spine and chip 11 of her vertebrae, as well as dislocate her left shoulder and tear a rhomboid on her right side. The injuries took her out of filming for a month.
- † Cops (2014). While filming a shooting incident at a Wendy's in Omaha, Nebraska, audio technician Bryce Dion was accidentally shot by Omaha Police Department gunfire. Dion and the suspect were transported to University of Nebraska Medical Center, where they both died.
- The Expendables 3 (2014). Sylvester Stallone suffered a serious back injury from a bad fall, requiring surgery that involved adding metal plates to his spine. In a separate scene, Antonio Banderas sustained a knee injury. While filming in Varna, Bulgaria, a truck driven by Jason Statham lost its brakes and fell into the Black Sea. Statham was able to swim out of the accident unharmed.
- Nightcrawler (2014). During filming of the intense mirror scene, Jake Gyllenhaal improvised smashing the mirror and subsequently cut his hands. He was discharged from the hospital with 46 stitches and needing surgery. The take was kept in the final film.
- Fury (2014). During filming in Oxfordshire, a stuntman was accidentally stabbed in the shoulder by a bayonet during rehearsals.
- † Midnight Rider: The Gregg Allman Story (2014, unfinished). On 20 February 2014, second camera assistant Sarah Jones was struck and killed by a CSX freight train. Several crew members were also injured. They attempted to shoot a scene with a hospital bed on an active railroad trestle at a location outside of Savannah, Georgia. CSX said that the production crew did not have permission to film on its property. As a consequence, the Safety for Sarah movement was launched to campaign for increased safety in future film productions.
- Top Gear (2014). During the Burma special in Series 21 Episode 6, Richard Hammond fell off a horse and had to be rushed to a hospital. In the Patagonia Special, James May cracked three ribs while attempting to mount a horse.
- 1864 (2015). During filming of the battles of the series, 18 extras collapsed due to wearing large woollen winter coats in the middle of summer where temperatures reached 43 degrees Celsius.
- † Dropped (2015). During the shooting of the French reality TV series, two helicopters collided on 9 March, killing 10 people. The helicopters were reportedly heading to a gorge in northwestern Argentina for the French broadcaster TF1. Eight French passengers and the choppers' two Argentinian pilots died near the town of Villa Castelli in La Rioja province, Argentina's state news agency Telam reported, citing local authorities. The dead included famed sailor Florence Arthaud, who in 1990 broke the record for crossing the North Atlantic alone; swimmer Camille Muffat, who won three medals at the 2012 Olympics in London; and boxer Alexis Vastine, who won a bronze medal at the 2008 Olympics in Beijing.
- Star Wars: The Force Awakens (2015). On 12 June 2014, Harrison Ford fractured a bone in his leg while filming at Pinewood Studios after a hydraulic door fell on him, and he was subsequently taken to a hospital to receive treatment. Filming was initially expected to continue as planned as Ford received treatment, though it was later revealed that production was suspended for two weeks to accommodate Ford's injury. Ford's son Ben said that his father's ankle would likely need a plate and screws and that filming would be altered slightly, with the crew needing to shoot Ford from the waist up for a short time until he recovered. Director J. J. Abrams also injured his back while helping lift the door off Ford's leg.
- It's Always Sunny in Philadelphia (2016). During the filming of the show's 11th season, Danny DeVito had to have weight added to his body for him to sink underwater. After the scene was finished filming, DeVito was unable to resurface on his own and needed to be rescued. DeVito left the set immediately after being rescued.
- Kadavul Irukaan Kumaru (2016). G. V. Prakash Kumar and RJ Balaji were injured in a car crash during the filming of an action sequence near Tindivanam.
- † Masti Gudi (2016). On 7 November 2016, actors Anil Kumar and Raghava Uday drowned in Thippagondanahalli Reservoir near Bangalore, when they took a 60-foot (18 m) plunge from a chopper while shooting the film's climax scene. A rescue motorboat scheduled to pull the actors out of the water did not start, resulting in both actors' deaths.
- Shooter (2016). On 6 July 2016, while filming a scene at Agua Dulce Airpark, actor Tom Sizemore accidentally ran over a stuntman. Sizemore was supposed to enter a Cadillac Escalade and stay there until the scene ended. The stunt coordinator told him not to pull out, but he did so regardless, not realizing that the stuntman was behind him.
- † Silence (2016). On 30 January 2015, a brick and wood house on the film's set in Taiwan suddenly collapsed on three construction workers who had been reinforcing the structure. One of the workers, Chen Yu-lung, was pronounced dead in the hospital. The other two sustained head and leg injuries.
- † Skiptrace (2016). On 17 December 2014, cinematographer Chan Kwok-Hung drowned when a motorized sampan he was on capsized during filming in Sunny Bay off Lantau Island in Hong Kong.
- † American Made (2017). Stunt pilot Alan D. Purwin and Venezuelan co-pilot Carlos Berl were killed when their aircraft crashed during filming in Medellín, Colombia. A third person on board the aircraft survived.
- † Blade Runner 2049 (2017). On 25 August 2016, a construction worker was killed while dismantling one of the film's sets at Origo Studios in Budapest, Hungary. In addition, while filming a scene, Harrison Ford accidentally punched Ryan Gosling in the face.
- A Dog's Purpose (2017). In 2017, a video was released of filming in 2015, where a German Shepherd dog named Hercules was submerged under a rushing current while the crew rushed towards him. The video shown by TMZ featured a man holding Hercules by the collar and leading him into the water, which led to accusations of manhandling. Amblin Entertainment released a statement in regards to the incident, saying that "on the day of the shoot, Hercules did not want to perform the stunt portrayed on the tape so the Amblin production team did not proceed with filming that shot", and that "Hercules is happy and healthy". On 4 February 2017, the American Humane Association reported that an independent third-party animal-cruelty expert had concluded that safety measures on the set of the film were in place and the video had been deliberately edited to mislead the public.
- The Fate of the Furious (2017). During principal photography in Mývatn, Iceland, on 14 March 2016, strong winds sent a plastic iceberg prop flying into a paddock and striking two horses. One died and the other was injured.
- The Grand Tour (2017). While filming in Mozambique for the series' second season, Richard Hammond was seriously injured after falling off his motorbike. While filming another segment on 10 June 2017, Hammond was hospitalized after crashing a Rimac Concept One during a hillclimbing event in Switzerland. Hammond was able to escape the accident with a fractured knee, despite the car flipping and catching fire shortly afterwards. The crash footage was shown in the first episode of the second season.
- Prison Break (2017). On 1 June 2016, Dominic Purcell suffered a broken nose and a head injury on set in Morocco after an iron bar used as a set piece had fallen onto his head. Purcell was immediately airlifted from Marrakesh to Casablanca for treatment, where he recovered.
- † Resident Evil: The Final Chapter (2017). Stunt double Olivia Jackson was severely injured in a motorcycle accident on set in South Africa in September 2015, leaving her in a medically induced coma for two weeks. During a high-speed motorcycle chase, she collided with a camera arm. Among Jackson's injuries were cerebral trauma, a crushed and degloved face, a severed artery in her neck, a paralyzed arm, several broken ribs, a shattered scapula, a broken clavicle, torn fingers with a thumb that needed to be amputated, and five nerves torn out of her spinal cord. Her paralyzed left arm was amputated in June 2016. Days after Jackson's accident, crew member Ricardo Cornelius was crushed to death by a Hummer H1 that slid off a platform he was operating.
- † The Walking Dead (2017). On 13 July 2017, stuntman John Bernecker suffered a head injury after falling more than 20 feet (6.1 m) off a balcony onto a concrete floor while filming a stunt for the show. He died the following day.
- Yowamushi Pedal 2 (2017). During filming of the second season of the live-action adaptation of the popular manga series, singer/actor Eiji Takigawa lost control of his bicycle and fell off after striking a roadside curb. He was airlifted by helicopter to hospital with severe spinal injuries. Immediately after the accident, he was unable to move any body part below the head, but slowly regained movement in his arms. Takigawa was eventually released from hospital in October 2018; 13 months after the accident.
- † Black Earth Rising (2018). On 18 November 2017, camera operator Mark Milsome was killed during a night shoot on location in Ghana when a stunt driver lost control of the vehicle and ploughed into Milsome, who was behind the camera. Milsome sustained multiple injuries, including to the high cervical spine, and was pronounced dead upon arrival at the local hospital in Accra. A coroner's inquest in October 2020 in the UK concluded that “shortly before the execution of the stunt, the risk of Mr Milsome being harmed or fatally injured was not effectively recognised, assessed, communicated or managed."
- † Deadpool 2 (2018). On 14 August 2017, stuntwoman Joi Harris was killed during filming after losing control of a motorcycle while turning a corner and crashing through a glass window.
- Ghostland (2018). In December 2016, actress Taylor Hickson crashed through a glass door while filming a scene, causing massive injuries to her face and requiring multiple reconstructive surgeries. She has a permanent facial scar as a result of the incident.
- Maze Runner: The Death Cure (2018). On 17 March 2016, actor Dylan O'Brien suffered multiple injuries on set after being run over by a car and was taken to hospital in Vancouver. Production was stopped after the accident.
- Mission: Impossible – Fallout (2018). In August 2017, actor Tom Cruise broke his right ankle while performing a stunt on the London set Following the accident, production was halted for nine weeks allowing the actor to heal. The footage of the failed stunt was later released.
- S.W.A.T. (2018). On July 18, 2018, Kenny Johnson suffered unspecified injuries while filming the premiere episode of the second season. The scene involved Johnson's character, Domenic Luca, hanging from the landing gear of a helicopter while the helicopter flies away. Johnson later sued the production company, Sony, over the incident. As of July 2022, the case was still pending. The case was later settled in February 2023 for an undisclosed amount.
- 9-1-1 (2019). During filming for Season 3 on 20 August 2019, Ronda Rousey injured two fingers after her left hand was jammed in a boat door.
- † A Beautiful Day in the Neighborhood (2019). Sound mixer James Emswiller suffered a heart attack and fell from an apartment-building balcony during filming in Mt. Lebanon, Pennsylvania, on 11 October 2018. He died in the hospital an hour later.
- † Chase Me (2019). On 27 November 2019, actor Godfrey Gao collapsed at about 1:45 am while filming. He was taken to a hospital, where after attempts at resuscitation for nearly three hours, he was pronounced dead.
- The Dirt (2019). On 11 March 2018, crew member Louis DiVincenti suffered an electric shock while de-rigging a set during the New Orleans shoot. He sustained second- and third-degree burns over 50 percent of his body, which required numerous surgeries, skin grafts, and the amputation of his right foot. On 1 March 2019, DiVincenti sued Netflix and Mötley Crüe for $1.8 million to compensate for his medical bills.
- † Ilyinskye Frontier (2019). Russian stuntman Oleg Shilkin, 31, was run over and killed by a vintage tank during filming of the movie set in World War II. The incident happened on the set located 120 miles (190 km) outside Moscow. The tank was meant to halt a short distance from where Shilkin was but failed to stop in time.
- L.A.'s Finest (2019). On 21 February 2019, executive producer and showrunner Brandon Sonnier was seriously injured during the shooting of a car stunt at the Port of Los Angeles. The vehicle accidentally crashed into the video village area of the set, and the resulting injury required the partial amputation of Sonnier's right leg.
- The Masked Singer (2019). During a dress rehearsal in season two, Michelle Williams, performing as The Butterfly, suffered an electric shock when a set piece short-circuited during a CO_{2} effect. Williams was reportedly fine but noted that the shock caused one of the boots she was wearing to split open.
- † Motherless Brooklyn (2019). On 22 March 2018, a fire broke out on one of the film's sets in New York City. The resulting blaze killed firefighter Lieutenant Michael Davidson.
- † The Story of Taiwan (2019). Director Chi Po-lin, his assistant Chen Kuan-chi, and pilot Chang Chi-kuang were killed in a helicopter crash on 10 June 2017 while shooting aerial footage in a mountainous area in Hualien County's Fengbin Township.

== 2020s ==
† indicates accidents and/or incidents resulting in death.

- Batwoman (2020). Production assistant Amanda Smith was paralyzed from the waist down by a bucket lift while filming in Vancouver.
- Geechee (2020; unfinished). In September 2020, production was halted indefinitely when a crew member was injured after the crew's convoy was fired upon several times by Dominican police. Apparently, the incident took place due to a case of mistaken identity. This caused the film production to be halted until further notice, but as of May 2023, no further updates on its production were given.
- Cowboy Bebop (2021). During the series' filming in New Zealand in October 2019, John Cho suffered a knee injury, forcing the production to halt for seven to nine months.
- F9 (2021). In July 2019, stuntman Joe Watts, who doubled for Vin Diesel, sustained a serious head injury after a major fall during filming at the Warner Bros. Studios in Leavesden, Hertfordshire. The stunt involved the stunt double jumping from a balcony using safety wiring. Watts had to be airlifted to the hospital where he was placed in an induced coma following the event. In September 2025, Watts spoke of how it took years for him to recover his ability to walk, talk, and live independently along with how it changed his life.
- † Love You Rachchu (2021). While filming a fight scene in Jogenahalli near Bidadi, Karnataka, stuntman Vivek stepped on an electric wire and died on the spot.
- No Time to Die (2021). Daniel Craig sustained an ankle injury while filming in Jamaica and subsequently underwent minor surgery. In a separate filming accident, a controlled explosion caused exterior damage to the 007 Stage at Pinewood Studios and left a crew member with minor injuries.
- † Street Outlaws: Fastest in America (2022). Actor Ryan Fellows died in a car crash in Las Vegas while participating in a race for the show. He lost control of his vehicle, which flipped over and caught fire.
- America's Got Talent: Extreme (unaired rehearsal for 2021/2 episode). In October 2021, escapologist Jonathan Goodwin was hospitalised following injuries sustained during a rehearsal for the program. The stunt was supposed to involve Goodwin escaping from a straitjacket while suspended upside-down 30 feet between two cars. Instead, he became crushed between the cars as they caught fire. Goodwin recovered from many severe injuries, but was left paralysed from the waist down, requiring the use of a wheelchair.
- Black Panther: Wakanda Forever (2022). While filming in Boston in August 2021, actress Letitia Wright sustained a fractured shoulder and concussion following an accident with a stunt rig. By November, after filming of scenes not involving her character Shuri had been completed, production shut down once Wright's injuries were revealed to be more serious than initially determined. Filming resumed in January 2022.
- Top Gear (2022). Presenter and former cricketer Freddie Flintoff received severe facial injuries and broken ribs in a December 2022 car crash while filming Top Gear. Flintoff reportedly settled with the BBC for £9 million. The show was finally cancelled after this incident.
- Anyone but You (2023). Actress Sydney Sweeney was bitten by a trained Huntsman spider whilst filming a scene; although not serious, she still bears the marks from the incident.
- † Indian 2 (2024). On 19 February 2020, during the shooting of the film, a crane carrying a heavy light fell, resulting in the deaths of three crew members, including an assistant director, and leaving 10 more injured. Director S. Shankar and actors Kamal Haasan and Kajal Aggarwal narrowly escaped.
- Kalki 2898 AD (2024). Actor Amitabh Bachchan tore a muscle and cartilage in his ribs while filming an action scene in Hyderabad.
- † Rust (2024). While filming in New Mexico, Alec Baldwin fired a live round from a prop gun on the set, killing cinematographer Halyna Hutchins and injuring director Joel Souza. A few weeks later, lamp operator and pipe rigger Jason Miller was bitten in the arm by a brown recluse spider; Miller suffered necrosis and sepsis, requiring multiple surgeries to avoid amputation of his arm.
- Bride Hard (2025). While filming an action sequence, Rebel Wilson was accidentally struck in the face by the butt of a gun, requiring stitches.
- The Pickup (2025). On April 20, 2024, during second unit filming in Atlanta, Georgia, multiple crew members were left injured in a stunt gone wrong, where an armored truck collided with a car, resulting in both vehicles flipping over.
- † Wonder Man (2026). Rigger J.C "Spike" Osorio died after the catwalk he was walking on failed and fell from the rafters at CBS Radford Studios. One of the wooden boards supporting the catwalk had deteriorated, and it collapsed while Osorio was standing on it. He fell 41 feet.
- Tomb Raider (TBA). On March 29, 2026, principal photography was put on hold for two weeks as the show's actress Sophie Turner suffered from back injuries. Filming would resume a few weeks later once she recovered.
- God of War (TBA). In late June 2026, Ryan Hurst, who had been cast as Kratos, suffered a torn bicep during a stunt for the series, forcing him to drop out of production to allow for full recovery; as a result of this injury, production was put on hiatus for five weeks, and Dave Bautista was cast as a replacement.
