= Gary Wells =

Gary Wells may refer to:

- Gary L. Wells, psychologist
- Gary Wells (motorcyclist), motorcyclist
