= Michael E. Tamburro =

Helicopter Pilot and Stuntman

Michael Edward Tamburro
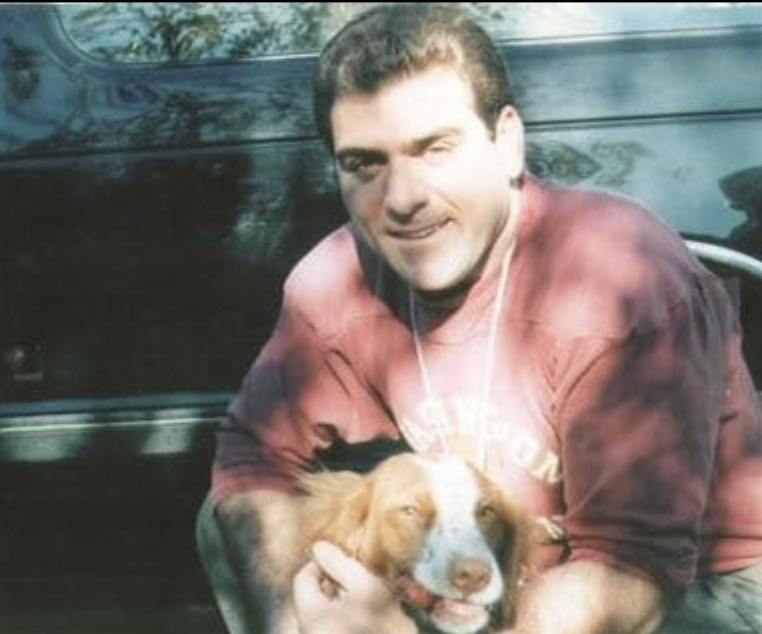
- Born: September 5, 1957; East Meadow, New York
- Died: August 20, 1996 (aged 38); Lancaster, California
- Education: California State University, Northridge
- Occupation: Helicopter Pilot
- Spouse: Tamara Ann Karle (m. 1982)
- Children: Michael Joseph Tamburro, Laura Angela Tamburro Galt

Michael Edward Tamburro (September 5, 1957 – August 20, 1996) was an American helicopter pilot. His television and film career was prominent in the 1980s-1990s. He was best known for his groundbreaking helicopter stunt work in Die Hard (1988), Terminator 2: Judgment Day (1991), and True Lies (1994).

== Early life and education ==
Tamburro was born on September 5, 1957, in East Meadow on Long Island, New York. He was the son of Italian American parents Anthony Tamburro and Eleanor Picerni. Eleanor's brother's, Charles Picerni and Paul Picerni both worked in the TV and movie industry. Paul, Tamburro's uncle was best known for his acting career, particularly in the hit ABC series, The Untouchables. Tamburro had 4 siblings, Charles "Chuck", John, Anthony, and Jerilyn Bayouth. Tamburro often worked closely with his brother, Charles Tamburro on numerous productions. Chuck Tamburro is a noted Vietnam Veteran with many screen credits. His youngest brother, John Tamburro, is also a helicopter camera and stunt pilot, who has been working in the TV and film industry since 1989. Tamburro's sister, Jerilyn Bayouth, was the wife of the late actor and stuntman, Ted White.

Tamburro moved to California with his family when he was 10. He grew up and attended school in Tarzana in the San Fernando Valley in Los Angeles. He graduated from Taft High School in 1975. He earned his Private Fixed Wing pilot's license when he was 18 while attending Pierce Community College. He transferred to California State University, Northridge and graduated in 1981 with a degree in geography. The Michael E. Tamburro Scholarship Fund at Cal State Northridge awards undergraduate Geography students that have transferred from a community college with tuition for four consecutive semesters. Tamburro received his Commercial Rotorcraft helicopter rating in 1983.

== Career ==
=== West Coast Helicopters ===
Tamburro co-founded West Coast Helicopters with his business partner, Alan Purwin, in 1987. West Coast Helicopters offered full scale operations including: charter, news gathering, organ donor procurement flying surgical teams, frost control, flight school, production work.

West Coast Helicopters was one of the early pioneers of news gathering on air reporting. They provided helicopters and pilots for numerous local stations including KTLA Morning news in the early years. They also provided news ships for national news channels during big news stories like the 1994 earthquake. Much of the aerial footage from these major stories was provided by West Coast Helicopters.

Tamburro's production work became prominent starting in the early 1980s, working with renowned directors like James Cameron on Terminator 2: Judgment Day and True Lies, Ron Howard on Apollo 13, and John McTiernan on Predator and Die Hard.

James Cameron provides commentary alongside co-writer William Wisher describing the innovative and excellent piloting skills performed by Mike and Chuck Tamburro in Terminator 2: Judgement Day.

== Personal life ==
=== Marriage and family ===
Tamburro married his college sweetheart, Tamara Ann Karle, in 1982. The couple had two children, Michael Joseph and Laura Angela. Michael Joseph also went on to become a helicopter pilot in the TV and film industry; he now owns a Production Safety company called Take 2 Risk & Safety.

=== Death ===
Michael died while co-piloting an AH-1 Huey Cobra helicopter while filming a commercial on August 20, 1996, on the edge of the Mohave Desert in Lancaster, California.

== Credits ==
Film & Television
| Year | Title | Role | Notes |
|---|---|---|---|
| 1985 | Cavegirl | helicopter co-pilot | |
| 1985 | Commando | helicopter pilot | |
| 1986 | Getting Even | helicopter pilot | |
| 1987 | Predator | helicopter pilot | |
| 1987 | Rampage | helicopter pilot | |
| 1988 | The Couch Trip | helicopter pilot | |
| 1988 | Action Jackson | helicopter ground coordinator | |
| 1988 | Die Hard | helicopter pilot | |
| 1989 | Road House | helicopter pilot | |
| 1989 | Lethal Weapon 2 | helicopter pilot | |
| 1988 | Vietnam War Story | helicopter co-pilot | 1 episode |
| 1989 | Road House | stunts | |
| 1989 | CBS Summer Playhouse | helicopter pilot | 1 episode |
| 1989 | Vietnam War Story: The Last Days | helicopter co-pilot | |
| 1990 | Catchfire | helicopter pilot | |
| 1990 | Die Hard 2 | aerial coordinator: second unit, helicopter pilot | |
| 1990 | The Adventures of Ford Fairlane | helicopter pilot | |
| 1991 | Stone Cold | helicopter ground coordinator | |
| 1991 | Terminator 2: Judgment Day | helicopter pilot | |
| 1991 | The Last Boy Scout | stunts | |
| 1991 | Timebomb | helicopter pilot | |
| 1992 | Man Trouble | helicopter co-pilot | |
| 1993 | Body Snatchers | helicopter pilot: second unit | |
| 1993 | Hot Shots! Part Deux | helicopter pilot | |
| 1993 | Me and the Kid | aerial coordinator | |
| 1993 | Fearless | helicopter pilot | |
| 1993 | Father Hood | helicopter pilot | |
| 1993 | General Hospital | helicopter pilot | 2 episodes |
| 1994 | Speed | helicopter pilot | |
| 1994 | True Lies | helicopter pilot, aerial service co-coordinator | |
| 1994 | The Puppet Masters | helicopter pilot: jet ranger | |
| 1995 | Outbreak | helicopter pilot | |
| 1995 | Apollo 13 | helicopter pilot: second unit | |
| 1995 | Virtuosity | helicopter pilot | |
| 1995 | The Crossing Guard | helicopter pilot | |
| 1995 | The Immortals | helicopter pilot | |
| 1996 | Sgt. Bilko | helicopter pilot | |
| 1996 | Barb Wire | helicopter pilot | |
| 1996 | The Rock | helicopter pilot: aerial unit | |
| 1996 | The Chamber | helicopter pilot | |
| 1996 | The Long Kiss Goodnight | helicopter pilot | |
| 1996 | Carjack | actor | |
| 1996 | The Glimmer Man | helicopter pilot | |
| 1996 | Dark Breed | stunts | |
| 1997 | Money Talks | helicopter pilot | |
