= American Made (film) =

2017 action comedy film by Doug Liman

- Theatrical release poster
- Directed by: Doug Liman
- Written by: Gary Spinelli
- Produced by: Brian Grazer; Brian Oliver; Doug Davison; Kim Roth; Ray Angelic; Tyler Thompson
- Starring: Tom Cruise; Domhnall Gleeson; Sarah Wright Olsen; Jesse Plemons; Caleb Landry Jones
- Cinematography: César Charlone
- Edited by: Andrew Mondshein
- Music by: Christophe Beck
- Production companies: Cross Creek Pictures; Imagine Entertainment; Quadrant Pictures; Vendian Entertainment
- Distributed by: Universal Pictures
- Release date: September 29, 2017
- Running time: 115 minutes
- Country: United States
- Language: English
- Budget: $50 million
- Box office: $134.9 million

American Made is a 2017 American crime comedy film directed by Doug Liman, written by Gary Spinelli and starring Tom Cruise, Domhnall Gleeson, Sarah Wright, Alejandro Edda, Mauricio Mejía, Caleb Landry Jones and Jesse Plemons. It is inspired by the life of Barry Seal, a former TWA pilot who became a drug smuggler for the Medellín Cartel in the 1980s and then, to avoid jail time, became an informant for the DEA.

The film was first released in Taiwan on August 18, 2017, and then in the United States on September 29, 2017. It is the first film directed by Liman to be released by Universal Pictures since The Bourne Identity in 2002 and played in 2D and IMAX in select theaters. It grossed $134 million worldwide and received generally positive reviews from critics, who praised Cruise's performance.

== Plot ==
In 1978, Baton Rouge pilot Barry Seal, who flies commercial jets for TWA, is recruited by CIA case officer Monty Schafer. He asks Seal, who has been smuggling Cuban cigars into the country to make a little money, to fly reconnaissance missions over Central America using an Aerostar 600, outfitted with aerial surveillance cameras. Seal accepts the job, but hides it from his wife, Lucy.

In the 1980s, Schafer asks Seal to act as a courier between the CIA and General Noriega in Panama. During a mission, the Medellín Cartel picks Seal up and asks him to fly cocaine on his return flights to the US. Seal accepts and flies the cartel's cocaine to Louisiana, airdropping the drug in the countryside.

The CIA turns a blind eye to the drug smuggling, but the DEA tracks Seal down. To avoid the authorities, Seal and his family relocate to Mena, Arkansas and his wife comes to accept the wealth generated by his side job. The small town becomes wealthy as the hub of US cocaine trafficking.

Later, Schafer asks Seal to run guns to the Nicaraguan Contras in Honduras. Realizing the Contras are not serious about the war and just want to get rich, Seal starts trading the guns to the cartel. The CIA sets up a Contra training base in Mena and Seal flies the Contras in, but many of them escape as soon as they arrive.

Seal makes so much money he buries it in suitcases in the backyard. Seal's freeloading, unemployed brother-in-law JB moves in. JB starts stealing money and is arrested with a briefcase full of cash.

With JB out on bail, Seal gives him money and a plane ticket to Bora Bora for his safety. JB demands weekly cash and insults Lucy. As Seal chases after him, JB is killed by a car bomb placed by the Medellín Cartel, who had previously promised to "take care" of the JB problem.

The FBI catches wind of the sudden exuberance on the streets of Mena, not helped by JB's reckless spending. Eventually, the CIA shuts down the program and abandons Seal, who is arrested by the FBI, DEA, ATF and Arkansas State Police simultaneously.

Seal escapes prosecution by making a deal with the White House, which wants evidence of the Sandinistas being drug traffickers. They ask him to get photos that tie the Medellín Cartel to the Nicaraguan Sandinistas. Seal manages to get them, but the White House releases them as propaganda against the Sandinistas. Seal is prominently shown in the pictures, which leads to his indictment by the crusading state attorney general and the cartel plotting revenge.

Seal is convicted but sentenced to only 1,000 hours of community service. Moving from motel to motel making video recordings detailing his experiences, Seal expects an explosion any time he starts his car. As his community service is performed at the same Salvation Army building every night, Seal cannot hide from the cartel and is shot dead by an assassin. The CIA destroys all evidence connecting them to Seal and continues smuggling, instead using Iran to get guns to the Contras, as proposed by Schafer.

The film ends with Schafer getting promoted for his idea, though it is soon discovered by the public with reporters asking President Reagan and Vice President Bush about the scandal. Lucy and her kids move back to Baton Rouge, where she is seen contentedly working in fast food. One of her expensive pieces of jewelry is seen on her wrist.

== Cast ==
- Tom Cruise as Barry Seal
- Domhnall Gleeson as Monty Schafer
- Sarah Wright as Lucy Seal
- Jesse Plemons as Sheriff Downing
- Caleb Landry Jones as JB
- Lola Kirke as Judy Downing
- Jayma Mays as Dana Sibota
- Alejandro Edda as Jorge Ochoa
- Benito Martinez as James Rangel
- E. Roger Mitchell as Agent Craig McCall
- Jed Rees as Louis Finkle
- Frank Licari as ATF Officer No. 1
- Justice Leak as DEA Agent Winter
- Fredy Yate as Carlos Lehder
- Mauricio Mejía as Pablo Escobar
- Connor Trinneer as George W. Bush
- Alberto Ospino as Manuel Antonio Noriega

== Production ==
=== Development ===
In the summer of 2013, screenwriter Gary Spinelli was looking for a project that was based on real events. On the bonus feature of American Made, Spinelli said:

I was looking for little hidden pieces of history. Small stories that affected larger global events and I came across the Mena story. And I always wanted to do a gangster film. Goodfellas is one of my favorite movies and I was always on the hunt to try to find my version of that. And once I started researching CIA's involvement in Mena, the same name kept popping up, was this Barry Seal character. As soon as I found Barry, I knew I had a movie.

The film was originally titled Mena and in 2014 was featured on The Black List, a survey showcasing the best unproduced screenplays in Hollywood. On January 14, 2015, it was announced that Tom Cruise and Edge of Tomorrow director Doug Liman would reunite for what was originally titled Mena.

=== Casting ===
Sarah Wright, Jayma Mays and Domhnall Gleeson were added to the cast in April. Jesse Plemons, Caleb Landry Jones and Lola Kirke were added to the cast in May 2015. Robert Farrior played "Lt Col Oliver North".

=== Filming ===
Principal photography on the film began on May 18, 2015, in Atlanta, Georgia. Filming locations there include counties Cherokee, Clayton, DeKalb, Fulton, Gwinnett, Morgan and Pickens. Filming on the Georgia Unit wrapped on July 12, 2015. On August 20, 2015, Cruise arrived in Medellín, Colombia and on August 31, in Santa Marta to scout filming locations for the film. Filming in Colombia commenced on August 26, 2015, and wrapped on September 11, 2015. Production on the film resumed February 3, 2016, in New Orleans, Louisiana as filming has been suspended due to a plane crash in Colombia that occurred in September 2015. Reshoots were filmed in Atlanta in late January 2017.

=== Plane crash ===
A plane crash on the set of the film in Colombia on September 11, 2015, killed two people and caused serious injuries to another member of the crew. The plane (a twin-engine Piper Aerostar), which was carrying crew members (three American pilots), was returning to Enrique Olaya Herrera Airport in Medellín when it ran into bad weather and the crash occurred. The dead were identified as Carlos Berl and Alan Purwin, who was the founder and president of Helinet Aviation, a company which provides aerial surveillance technology to government agencies and law enforcement and a film pilot who had worked in top films. American pilot Jimmy Lee Garland was seriously injured and rushed to a local hospital.

== Release ==
In May 2015, Universal set the film for release on January 6, 2017. On August 8, 2016, the film's release was pushed to September 29, 2017, and its title changed from Mena to American Made. It was released in Europe on August 23, 2017, and in the United States on September 29, 2017, and also screened at the Deauville Film Festival on September 1, 2017.

=== Home media ===
American Made was released on Digital HD on December 19, 2017, in the United States by Universal Pictures Home Entertainment, and on Ultra HD Blu-ray, Blu-ray and DVD on December 26, 2017, in the United Kingdom and January 2, 2018 in the United States.

== Reception ==
=== Box office ===
American Made grossed $51.3 million in the United States and Canada and $83.6 million in other territories, for a worldwide total of $134.9 million, against a production budget of $50 million.

In North America, American Made was released alongside the openings of Flatliners and 'Til Death Do Us Part, as well as the wide expansion of Battle of the Sexes and was projected to gross $12–15 million from 3,023 theaters in its opening weekend. It made $960,000 from Thursday night previews, the lowest total by a Cruise-led film in recent years and $6.1 million on its first day. Initially, studio estimates had the film opening to $17 million, finishing third at the box office, behind holdovers It ($17.3 million) and Kingsman: The Golden Circle ($17 million). The following day, actual results had the film debuting to $16.8 million, with Kingsman beating out It by a gross of $16.93 million to $16.90 million. 91% of its opening weekend audience was over the age of 25. In its second weekend, the film grossed $8.1 million (a drop of 51%), finishing 6th.

The film was released in 21 countries on August 25, 2017, and grossed a total of $6.1 million over the weekend. It finished number one in 11 of the territories, including the UK, where it replaced five-time champ Dunkirk.

=== Critical response ===
On Rotten Tomatoes, the film has an approval rating of 85% based on 267 reviews. The site's critical consensus states, "American Made's fast-and-loose attitude with its real-life story mirrors the cavalier – and delightfully watchable – energy Tom Cruise gives off in the leading role." On Metacritic the film has a weighted average score of 65 out of 100, based on reviews from 50 critics. Audiences polled by CinemaScore gave the film an average grade of "B+" on an A+ to F scale, while PostTrak reported filmgoers gave it a 55% "definite recommend".

Variety's Guy Lodge wrote: "A sweat-slicked, exhausting but glibly entertaining escapade on its own terms, American Made is more interesting as a showcase for the dateless elasticity of Cruise's star power. It feels, for better or worse, like a film he could have made at almost any point in the last 30 years." Leslie Felperin of The Hollywood Reporter wrote: "This is yet another hyper-competent, boyishly devil-may-care character that offers Cruise, famous for his derring-do on set, a chance to do his own stunts and fly a plane; it's not a role all that far out of the ageing megastar's wheelhouse."

== Historical accuracy ==
The film's opening credits make clear it is not entirely factually accurate, with a "Based on a true story" disclaimer. Liman has described the film as "a fun lie based on a true story." When asked by Abraham Riesman of Vulture if the film was a biographical film, director Doug Liman said "You know, we're not making a biopic. Tom Cruise doesn't look like Barry Seal. His character is inspired by the stories we learned about Barry." Although Cruise reportedly gained weight for the role, he is only 5 ft 7 in (1.70 m) tall and Seal was an obese man who reportedly weighed 300 pounds (140 kg).

Despite the film's suggestion Seal was recruited by the CIA while working for TWA, Seal denied in court that he had ever worked for the CIA. Monty Schafer was a fictional character and not based on a real-life CIA officer. A 1996 report by the CIA inspector general acknowledged that the agency had conducted a covert training exercise at the Mena Intermountain Municipal Airport with another federal agency, but found no evidence that the agency had been involved in any illegal activities.

Seal was fired from TWA in 1974 for falsely claiming medical leave when he was involved in a smuggling scheme. Seal's connections with cartel bosses were also not direct when he was running his drug operations and he did not meet Pablo Escobar and the Ochoa brothers in person until 1984, when he was working as an informant for the DEA on an undercover operation, following his arrest.

Seal's third wife Deborah, loosely adapted into the character Lucy, stated Seal started his drug smuggling business in 1975, not 1980 like the film suggests and also stated the smuggling was centered around marijuana before it involved cocaine. Seal's DEA record also noted he expanded to smuggling cocaine in 1978 and claimed that he was smuggling marijuana as early as 1976. Additionally, Seal's ties to the Medellín Cartel did not begin after being kidnapped while refueling his plane in Colombia, but when he met a smuggler who flew for cartel operative Jorge Ochoa during a flight home from Honduras where he served nine months in a local jail after being caught smuggling drugs in 1979.

Liman has also acknowledged that the film's zero-gravity love scene was his idea and that he received the inspiration for it after he and Cruise collided in the cockpit while filming a flight scene.

Seal was unapologetic about his weapons and drug smuggling operations, even stating once in a television interview, "Whether you call it soldier of fortune or what, it's a way of life for me. I enjoy it and I'm going to keep doing it." He also never crash-landed into a suburban neighborhood.
