= Bennie Dobbins =

American stuntman and actor

- Born: November 16, 1932; Los Angeles County, California, U.S.
- Died: February 5, 1988 (aged 55); Vienna, Austria
- Years active: 1957–1988

Benny E. Dobbins (Note: Dobbins had several nicknames including Ben, Bennie, and Bernie.) (November 16, 1932 – February 5, 1988) was an American stuntman, actor, stunt coordinator, and second unit director.

== Biography ==
As coordinator and director, Dobbins is known for films such as Planes, Trains and Automobiles, The Running Man, Extreme Prejudice, Ferris Bueller's Day Off, Commando, and Weird Science.

As a stuntman and actor, Dobbins was frequently omitted from the end credits. Even in his credited work, he is often given generic character names such as Cowboy #2 in Gunsmoke (S17E21 "Yankton") and 1st Bandit in The Six Million Dollar Man (S1E12 "The Coward").

Dobbins died in Austria after suffering a heart attack near the ski resort of Schladming during the filming of Red Heat starring Arnold Schwarzenegger. Dobbins was a second unit director on the film, and was coordinating the stunts when he collapsed. He was airlifted from the film location by helicopter to a hospital where, later, a doctor pronounced him dead.

== Filmography ==
A partial filmography follows.

=== Second unit director/Stunts ===
Year	Title	Stunts	Second unit director	Director
1971	Dirty Harry	Yes	No	Don Siegel
1973	Magnum Force	Yes	No	Ted Post
1974	Blazing Saddles	Yes	No	Mel Brooks
1980	Used Cars	Yes	No	Robert Zemeckis
1982	48 Hrs.	Yes	No	Walter Hill
1982	First Blood	Yes	No	Ted Kotcheff
1982	E.T. the Extra-Terrestrial	Yes	No	Steven Spielberg
1985	Weird Science	Yes	Yes	John Hughes
1985	Commando	Yes	Yes	Mark L. Lester
1986	Ferris Bueller's Day Off	Yes	Yes	John Hughes
1987	Extreme Prejudice	Yes	Yes	Walter Hill
1987	The Running Man	Yes	Yes	Paul Michael Glaser
1987	Planes, Trains and Automobiles	Yes	Yes	John Hughes
1988	Red Heat	Yes	Yes	Walter Hill

=== Actor ===
- Gunsmoke (1972) as Cowboy #2 (S17E21 "Yankton")
- The Six Million Dollar Man (1974) as 1st Bandit (S1E12 "The Coward")
