= Alan Purwin =

American helicopter pilot and businessman (1961–2015)

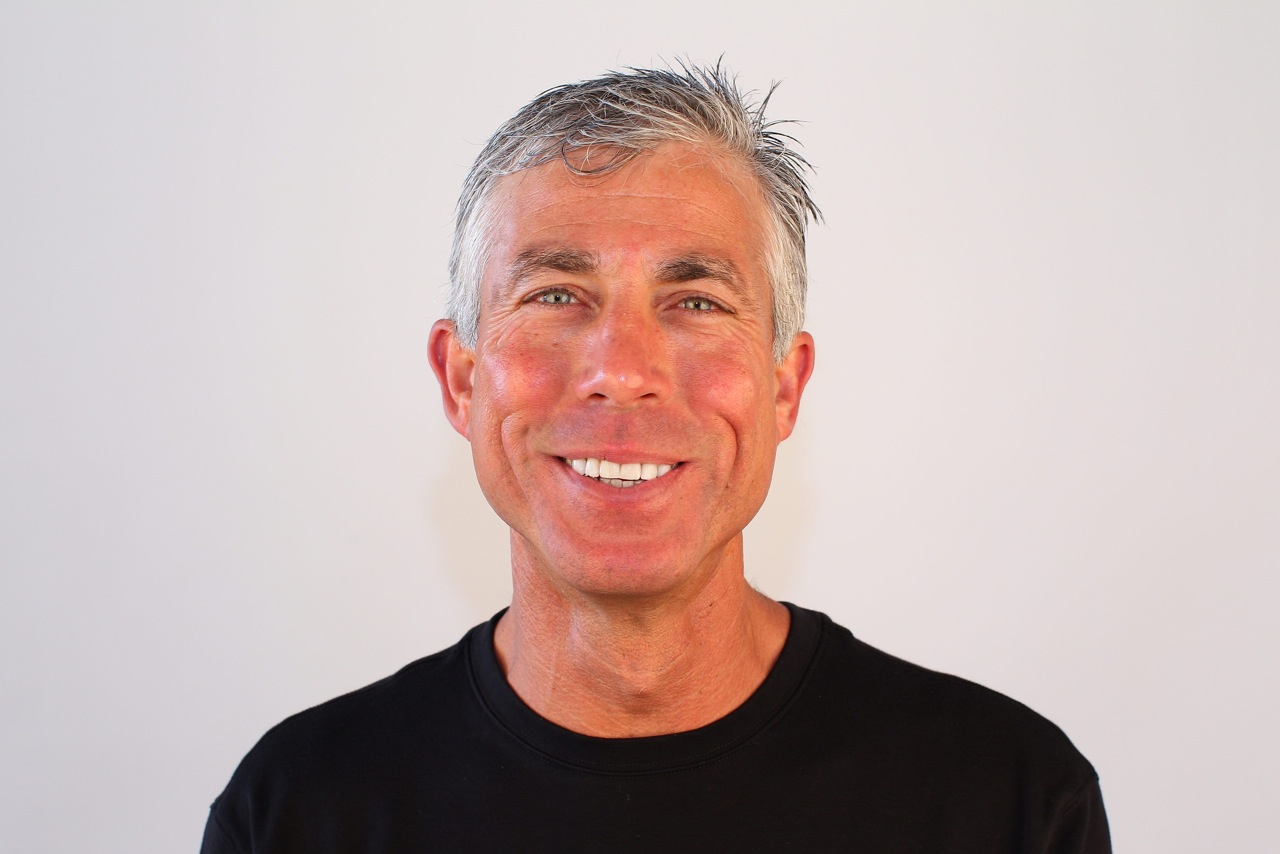
- Born: Alan David Purwin; August 28, 1961; Los Angeles, California, U.S.
- Died: September 11, 2015 (aged 54); San Pedro de los Milagros, Colombia
- Cause of death: Plane crash
- Education: Grant High School; Pierce College (Los Angeles)
- Occupations: Founder & Owner of Helinet
- Spouse: Kathryn Purwin
- Children: Kyle Purwin and Michaela Purwin
- Website: www.helinet.com

Alan David Purwin (August 28, 1961 – September 11, 2015) was an American helicopter pilot, aerial film operator, entrepreneur and philanthropist. Purwin founded and owned Helinet Aviation. Purwin contributed to the aerial cinematography industry and aided in the filming of hundreds of Hollywood movies such as Pearl Harbor, Pirates of the Caribbean film series and the Transformers film series.

On September 11, 2015, while working on the film American Made with Aerial Coordinator Fred North and Aerial Director of Photography Goss Dylan, Purwin died in a plane crash in the Andean natural region of Colombia.

== Early life and family ==
Purwin was born on August 28, 1961 in Southern California and was raised in North Hollywood, California. Purwin's father owned an automobile repair business. When Purwin was a child, he would fly with his father in a single-engine Cessna 210. Purwin's father flew the plane as a hobby around all of North America. Purwin's father also flew cancer patients for medical treatment in support of the Angel Flight Network.

Purwin attended Grant High School in the greater Los Angeles area. While in high school, Purwin earned his fixed-wing pilot certificate. At the age of eighteen, with prodding from his father, Purwin piloted a helicopter for the first time. At the age of nineteen, Purwin worked as a helicopter crop duster in Greenfield, Indiana, where he flew ten to twelve hours a day. Purwin said of his time in Indiana: "It was the perfect opportunity to rack up flying hours and become familiar with the aircraft."

After his short time in Indiana, Purwin returned to Southern California and worked for a helicopter company that took aerial video footage of the 1984 Summer Olympics that took place in Los Angeles. He flew helicopters that covered cycling and sailing. After that, Purwin did aerial helicopter stunts for television shows including The A-Team and Airwolf.

== Helicopter business and film career ==
=== West Coast Helicopters ===
In 1987, Purwin and Michael Tamburro co-founded West Coast Helicopters. Purwin, along with Michael sold just about everything they owned and bought a first generation, Bell 206 LongRanger. The company provided flight services to the Los Angeles Kings and performed aerial stunts for a television show called, The Adventures of Buck James. In 1988, West Coast Helicopters signed on with hospitals to transport medical teams for organ transplants. In 1990, West Coast Helicopters secured its first news contract with KTLA in Los Angeles.

On August 21, 1996, Purwin crashed an AH-1 Huey Cobra helicopter during the filming of a Michael Bay-directed Black+Decker television commercial, injuring himself and a crew member on the ground, and killing his co-pilot and business partner in West Coast Helicopters, Michael Tamburro.

West Coast Helicopters and Purwin offered charter services, flying corporate executives and celebrities. In 2011, Purwin took Prince Harry on a helicopter tour of Los Angeles, California. One of Purwin's clients was Emil P. Martini Jr., a major pharmaceutical company executive. Martini mentored Purwin and taught him how to run a business. Purwin said Martini taught him "if you want to get ahead in business, you have to anticipate trends. Trust your gut."

=== Helinet ===
In 1998, Purwin purchased Helinet Aviation, merging it with West Coast Helicopters, which enabled the company to expand its business. Purwin aided in the filming of over a hundred Hollywood movies as a helicopter pilot and aerial coordinator. Purwin shot extreme aerial shots for up to ten films a year from a camera mounted onto his helicopter. Purwin shook up the aerial cinematography industry by changing the business model. Purwin often worked in dangerous conditions, and tried to "de-risk" when working in dangerous conditions. On the set of Tropic Thunder, Purwin recalled: “(Ben Stiller) would tell me, ‘Go crazy Alan, and do your own thing.’ And most of that stuff ended up in the movie.”

In 2015, Purwin was granted an exemption by the Federal Aviation Administration to operate unmanned aerial vehicles, commonly known as drones. Purwin's company supplied the drone work for a Narcos shoot in Colombia.

After Purwin's death in 2015, his wife Kathryn became CEO and owner of Helinet Aviation.

=== Cineflex ===
In 2003, Purwin bought a controlling interest in Cineflex, an aerial-camera startup that developed one of the first gyro-stabilized camera systems capable of transmitting high-definition video from a helicopter without any loss of quality. At the time of his investment, the film industry was shifting to the high-definition digital standard. Cineflex's customers included law enforcement agencies. In 2007, Axsys Technologies acquired Cineflex.

=== ShotOver ===
In 2012, Purwin acquired ShotOver Camera Systems. ShotOver is an aerial cinematography subsidiary of Helinet Aviation and develops aerial camera systems with gyro-stabilized camera platforms for the motion picture and broadcasting industries.

=== VideoFort ===
In 2013, Purwin founded VideoFort with Steve Gatena, Bryan M., Chris Carter, Judy Gatena & Andy McNeil as a joint partnership between Helinet Aviation and REP Interactive. VideoFort is one of the largest manufacturers of HD and Ultra HD stock footage. Before founding VideoFort, Purwin was known to have the world's largest collection of aerial HD stock footage.

== Philanthropic work ==
=== Hurricane Katrina ===
In 2005, Purwin's company, Helinet & Cineflex, provided support to the United States Coast Guard and the Department of Homeland Security during Hurricane Katrina. They also provided the aerial footage of the storm-zone for all the major news media outlets. Purwin along with J.T. Alpaugh were the first news crew to see the destruction zone from above.

In 2015, ABC reported that, although Purwin's and Alpaugh's first priority was to document the events, the team helped rescue many people during the disaster. Alpaugh recalled of the team: "We would fly in an area and we'd see someone pop up on a rooftop and wave to us. You'd see the signs: 'help us, come get us, S.O.S.' We'd call in these rescues and five minutes later a Coast Guard Jayhawk or a Delphine would come in and hoist rescue them out."

=== Hospital support ===
Helinet and Purwin provided medical transport services free of charge to patients and hospitals. In 1999, Helinet donated a Sikorsky S-76 to Children's Hospital Los Angeles as well as trained pilots and helicopter maintenance. As of 2004, Purwin's company Helinet had flown more than 30,000 organ-transfer missions for six hospitals. Every year, Helinet also transported nearly 3,000 children for Children's Hospital Los Angeles. By 2014, Helinet and Purwin had provided Children's Hospital Los Angeles with helicopter services free of charge, including one Sikorsky S-76B, one Sikorsky S-76A, helicopter maintenance, and six experienced pilots (four full-time and two backups). Purwin served on the Children's Hospital Los Angeles Board of Trustees.

== Death ==
On September 11, 2015, Purwin died in a plane crash in Colombia, South America, during the shooting of the film American Made starring Tom Cruise. Purwin was returning to Enrique Olaya Herrera Airport in Medellín. According to an official, the normal duration of the flight was 10 minutes and it required a skilled pilot to clear the Andes and descend sharply into the steep valley around Medellín. In the crash, American pilot Carlos Berl was also killed, while American pilot Jimmy Lee Garland was seriously injured and rushed to a local hospital. The plane crash, in a twin-engine Piper Aerostar, is attributed to bad weather.

He is interred in the Forest Lawn Memorial Park (Hollywood Hills).

=== Tributes ===
Ben Stiller tweeted: "Shocked about the loss of #AlanPurwin. One of the best people I knew and the greatest pilots ever. I put my life in his hands many times." F. Gary Gray wrote: "To the BEST PILOT in the industry! RIP Alan Purwin. Much love brother! Condolences to the @helinet family." Michael Bay posted on his website: Purwin "was one of the best aerial helicopter pilots in the world. It’s a very small group. He flew camera ships for so many – and for almost every one of my movies. We will miss him. He was one of the most loyal members of my team and a true friend." Helinet CEO Steve Gatena wrote on Helinet's website: “Alan Purwin was a great man, a world-renowned aviator and a brilliant entrepreneur. At Helinet, Alan was known for his passion, generosity and ability to make us all feel as though we were a part of something much bigger than ourselves."
