= Gary Wells (motorcyclist) =

American motorcycle stunt performer (1957–2020)

Gary Wells (1957 – 2020) was an American motorcycle daredevil. On September 15, 1980, during a taping of the reality television show That's Incredible! he attempted to jump the fountains at Caesars Palace, a stunt made famous by Evel Knievel's failed attempt, but also crashed and was severely injured.

Gary Wells died in Glendale, Ariz., on August 6, 2020.
