= Women in science =

Contributions of women to the field of science

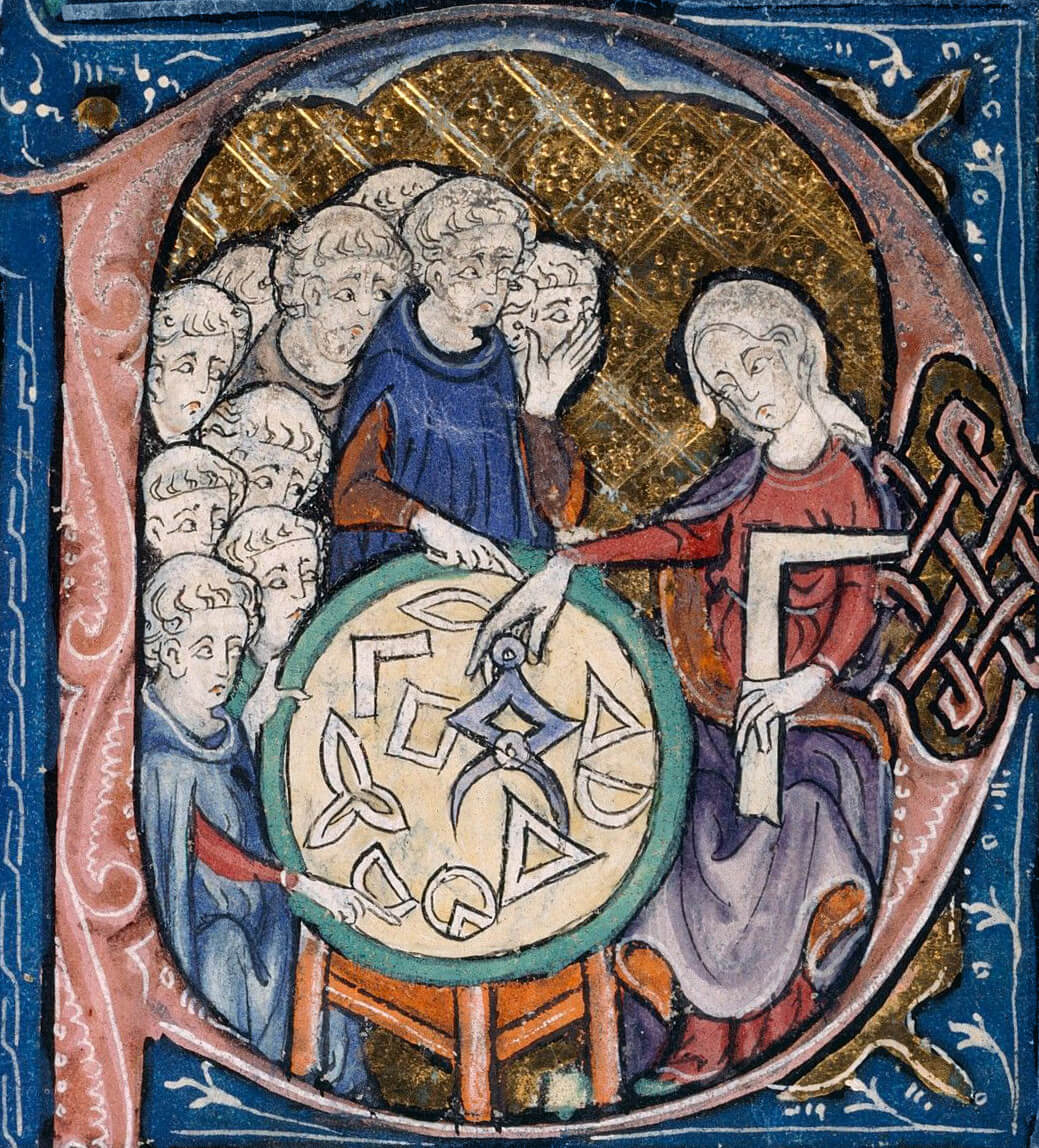
An illustration of a woman teaching geometry, from a medieval illuminated manuscript of Euclid's Elements (c. 1310 C.E.)

The presence of women in science spans the earliest times of the history of science wherein they have made substantial contributions. Historians with an interest in gender and science have researched the scientific endeavors and accomplishments of women, the barriers they have faced, and the strategies implemented to have their work peer-reviewed and accepted in major scientific journals and other publications. The historical, critical, and sociological study of these issues has become an academic discipline in its own right.

The involvement of women in medicine occurred in several early Western civilizations, and the study of natural philosophy in ancient Greece was open to women. Women contributed to the proto-science of alchemy in the first or second centuries CE. During the Middle Ages, religious convents were an important place of education for women, and some of these communities provided opportunities for women to contribute to scholarly research. The 11th century saw the emergence of the first universities; women were, for the most part, excluded from university education. Outside academia, botany was the science that benefitted most from women's contributions in early modern times. The attitude toward educating women in medical fields appears to have been more liberal in Italy than elsewhere. The first known woman to earn a university chair in a scientific field of study was eighteenth-century Italian scientist Laura Bassi.

Gender roles were largely deterministic in the eighteenth century and women made substantial advances in science. During the nineteenth century, women were excluded from most formal scientific education, but they began to be admitted into learned societies during this period. In the later nineteenth century, the rise of the women's college provided jobs for women scientists and opportunities for education. Marie Curie paved the way for scientists to study radioactive decay and discovered the elements radium and polonium. Working as a physicist and chemist, she conducted pioneering research on radioactive decay and was the first woman to receive a Nobel Prize in Physics and the first person to receive a second Nobel Prize in Chemistry. Sixty women have been awarded the Nobel Prize between 1901 and 2022. Twenty-four women have been awarded the Nobel Prize in physics, chemistry, physiology or medicine.

== Cross-cultural perspectives ==
In the 1970s and 1980s, many books and articles about women scientists were published. Virtually all of the published sources ignored women of color and women outside of Europe and North America. The formation of the Kovalevskaia Fund in 1985 and the Organization for Women in Science for the Developing World in 1993 gave more visibility to previously marginalized women scientists, but even today there is a dearth of information about current and historical women in science in developing countries. According to academic Ann Hibner Koblitz:

Most work on women scientists has focused on the personalities and scientific subcultures of Western Europe and North America, and historians of women in science have implicitly or explicitly assumed that the observations made for those regions will hold true for the rest of the world.

Koblitz has said that these generalizations about women in science often do not hold up cross-culturally:

A scientific or technical field that might be considered 'unwomanly' in one country in a given period may enjoy the participation of many women in a different historical period or in another country. An example is engineering, which in many countries is considered the exclusive domain of men, especially in usually prestigious subfields, such as electrical or mechanical engineering. There are exceptions to this, however. In the former Soviet Union all subspecialties of engineering had high percentages of women, and at the Universidad Nacional de Ingeniería of Nicaragua, women made up 70% of engineering students in 1990.

== Historical examples ==
=== Ancient history ===
The involvement of women in the field of medicine has been recorded in several early civilizations. An ancient Egyptian physician, Peseshet (c. 2600–2500 BCE), described in an inscription as "lady overseer of the female physicians", is the earliest known female physician named in the history of science. Agamede was cited by Homer as a healer in ancient Greece before the Trojan War (c. 1194–1184 BCE).

The study of natural philosophy in ancient Greece was open to women. Recorded examples include Aglaonike, who predicted eclipses; and Theano, mathematician and physician, who was a pupil (possibly also wife) of Pythagoras, and one of the school in Crotone founded by Pythagoras, which included many other women. A passage in Pollux speaks about those who invented the process of coining money, mentioning Pheidon and Demodike, wife of the Phrygian king, Midas, and daughter of King Agamemnon of Cyme. This link may have facilitated the Greeks "borrowing" their alphabet from the Phrygians because the Phrygian letter shapes are closest to the inscriptions from Aeolis.

During the period of the Babylonian civilization (c. 1200 BCE), two perfumeresses named Tapputi-Belatekallim and -ninu (first half of her name unknown) were able to obtain the essences from plants by using extraction and distillation procedures. During the Egyptian dynasty, women were involved in applied chemistry, such as the making of beer and the preparation of medicinal compounds. Women have been recorded to have made major contributions to alchemy. Many of whom lived in Alexandria around the 1st or 2nd centuries C.E., where the gnostic tradition led to female contributions being valued. The most famous of the women alchemists, Mary the Jewess, is credited with inventing several chemical instruments, including the double boiler (bain-marie); the improvement or creation of distillation equipment of that time. Such distillation equipment was called kerotakis (simple still) and the tribikos (a complex distillation device).

Hypatia of Alexandria (c. 350–415 CE), daughter of Theon of Alexandria, was a philosopher, mathematician, and astronomer. She is the earliest female mathematician about whom detailed information has survived. Hypatia is credited with writing several important commentaries on geometry, algebra, and astronomy. Hypatia was the head of a philosophical school and taught many students. In 415 CE, she became entangled in a political dispute between Cyril, the bishop of Alexandria, and Orestes, the Roman governor, which resulted in a mob of Cyril's supporters stripping her, dismembering her, and burning the pieces of her body.

=== Medieval Europe ===
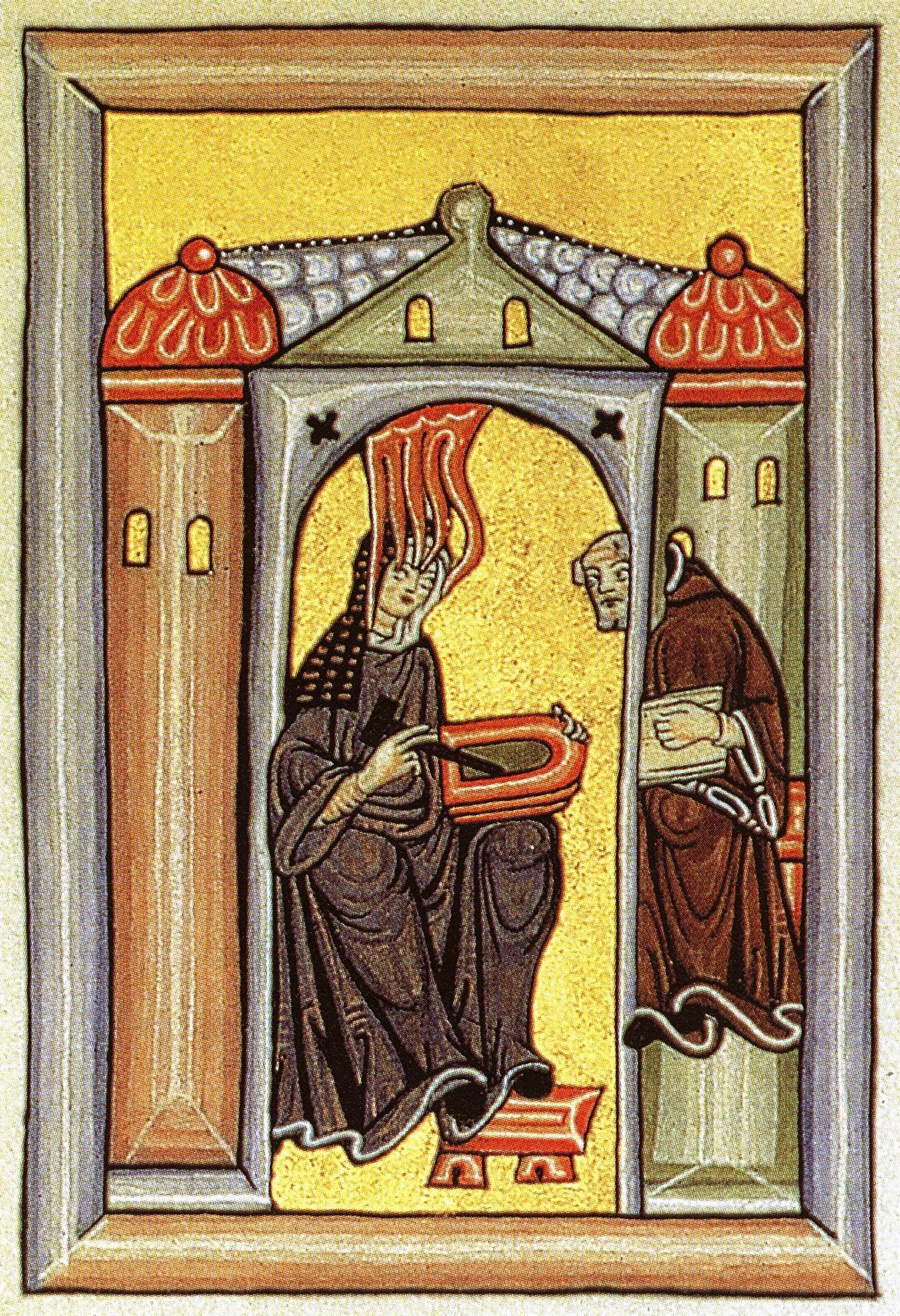
Hildegard of Bingen

The early parts of the European Middle Ages, also known as the Dark Ages, were marked by the decline of the Roman Empire. The Latin West was left with great difficulties that dramatically affected the continent's intellectual production. Although nature was still seen as a system that could be comprehended through reason, there was little innovative scientific inquiry. The Arabic world deserves credit for preserving scientific advancements. Arabic scholars produced original scholarly work and generated copies of manuscripts from classical periods. During this period, Christianity underwent a period of resurgence, and Western civilization was bolstered as a result. This phenomenon was, in part, due to monasteries and nunneries that nurtured the skills of reading and writing, and the monks and nuns who collected and copied important writings by scholars of the past.

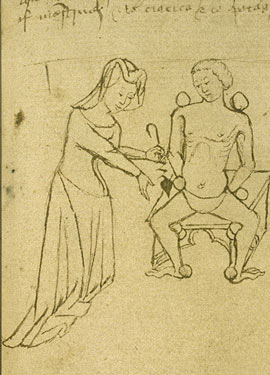
Female physician caring for a patient

As mentioned before, convents were an important place of education for women during this period, for the monasteries and nunneries encouraged the skills of reading and writing, and some of these communities provided opportunities for women to contribute to scholarly research. An example is the German abbess Hildegard of Bingen (c. 1080–1179 AD), a famous philosopher and botanist, whose prolific writings include treatments of various scientific subjects, including medicine, botany and natural history (c. 1151–58). Another famous German abbess was Hroswitha of Gandersheim (935–1000 AD) that also helped encourage women to be intellectual. However, with the growth in number and power of nunneries, the all-male clerical hierarchy was not welcomed toward it, and thus it stirred up conflict by having backlash against women's advancement. That impacted many religious orders closed on women and disbanded their nunneries, and overall excluding women from the ability to learn to read and write. With that, the world of science became closed off to women, limiting women's influence in science.

Entering the 11th century, the first universities emerged. Women were, for the most part, excluded from university education. However, there were some exceptions. The Italian University of Bologna allowed women to attend lectures from its inception, in 1088.

The attitude toward educating women in medical fields in Italy appears to have been more liberal than in other places. The physician Trotula di Ruggiero is supposed to have held a chair at the Medical School of Salerno in the 11th century, where she taught many noble Italian women, a group sometimes referred to as the "ladies of Salerno". Several influential texts on women's medicine, dealing with obstetrics and gynecology, among other topics, are also often attributed to Trotula.

Dorotea Bucca was another distinguished Italian physician. She held a chair of philosophy and medicine at the University of Bologna for over forty years, from 1390. Other Italian women whose contributions in medicine have been recorded include Abella, Jacobina Félicie, Rebecca de Guarna, Margarita, Mercuriade (14th century), Constance Calenda, Calrice di Durisio (15th century), Constanza, Maria Incarnata and Thomasia de Mattio.

Despite the success of some women, cultural biases affecting their education and participation in science were prominent in the Middle Ages. For example, Saint Thomas Aquinas, a Christian scholar, wrote, referring to women, "She is mentally incapable of holding a position of authority."

=== Scientific Revolutions of 1600s and 1700s ===
Margaret Cavendish

Margaret Cavendish, a seventeenth-century aristocrat, took part in some of the most important scientific debates of that time. She was, however, not inducted into the English Royal Society, although she was once allowed to attend a meeting. She wrote a number of works on scientific matters, including Observations upon Experimental Philosophy (1666) and Grounds of Natural Philosophy. In these works she was especially critical of the growing belief that humans, through science, were the masters of nature. The observations provided a critique of the experimental science of Bacon and criticized microscopes as imperfect machines.

Isabella Cortese, an Italian alchemist, is best known for her book I secreti della signora Isabella Cortese or The Secrets of Isabella Cortese. Cortese was able to manipulate nature in order to create several medicinal, alchemy and cosmetic "secrets" or experiments. Isabella's book of secrets belongs to a larger book of secrets that became extremely popular among the elite during the 16th century. Despite the low percentage of literate women during Cortese's era, the majority of alchemical and cosmetic "secrets" in the book of secrets were geared towards women. This included but was not limited to pregnancy, fertility, and childbirth.

Sophia Brahe, sister of Tycho Brahe, was a Danish horticulturalist. Brahe was trained by her older brother in chemistry and horticulture but taught herself astronomy by studying books in German. Sophia visited her brother in Uranienborg on numerous occasions and assisted on his project the De nova stella. Her observations led to the discovery of the supernova SN 1572 which helped refute the geocentric model of the universe.

In Germany, the tradition of female participation in craft production enabled some women to become involved in observational science, especially astronomy. Between 1650 and 1710, women were 14% of German astronomers. The most famous female astronomer in Germany was Maria Winkelmann. She was educated by her father and uncle and received training in astronomy from a nearby self-taught astronomer. Her chance to be a practicing astronomer came when she married Gottfried Kirch, Prussia's foremost astronomer. She became his assistant at the astronomical observatory operated in Berlin by the Academy of Science. She made original contributions, including the discovery of a comet. When her husband died, Winkelmann applied for a position as an assistant astronomer at the Berlin Academy – for which she had the necessary experience. As a woman – with no university degree – she was denied the post. Members of the Berlin Academy feared that they would establish a bad example by hiring a woman. "Mouths would gape", they said.

Winkelmann's problems with the Berlin Academy reflect the obstacles women faced in being accepted in scientific work, which was considered to be chiefly for men. No woman was invited to either the Royal Society of London nor the French Academy of Sciences until the twentieth century. Most people in the seventeenth century viewed a life devoted to any kind of scholarship as being at odds with the domestic duties women were expected to perform.

A founder of modern botany and zoology, the German Maria Sibylla Merian (1647–1717), spent her life investigating nature. When she was thirteen, Merian began growing caterpillars and studying their metamorphosis into butterflies. She kept a "Study Book" which recorded her investigations into natural philosophy. In her first publication, The New Book of Flowers, she used imagery to catalog the lives of plants and insects. After her husband died, and her brief stint living in Siewert, she and her daughter journeyed to Paramaribo for two years to observe insects, birds, reptiles, and amphibians. She returned to Amsterdam and published The Metamorphosis of the Insects of Suriname, which "revealed to Europeans for the first time the astonishing diversity of the rain forest." She was a botanist and entomologist who was known for her artistic illustrations of plants and insects. Uncommon for that era, she traveled to South America and Suriname, where, assisted by her daughters, she illustrated the plant and animal life of those regions.

Overall, the Scientific Revolution did little to change people's ideas about the nature of women – more specifically – their capacity to contribute to science just as men do. According to Jackson Spielvogel, 'Male scientists used the new science to spread the view that women were by nature inferior and subordinate to men and suited to play a domestic role as nurturing mothers. The widespread distribution of books ensured the continuation of these ideas'.

=== Eighteenth century ===
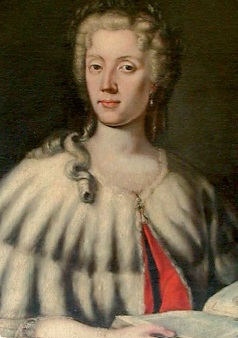
Laura Bassi, the first woman to earn a professorship in physics at a university in Europe

Although women excelled in many scientific areas during the eighteenth century, they were discouraged from learning about plant reproduction. Carl Linnaeus' system of plant classification based on sexual characteristics drew attention to botanical licentiousness, and people feared that women would learn immoral lessons from nature's example. Women were often depicted as both innately emotional and incapable of objective reasoning, or as natural mothers reproducing a natural, moral society.

The eighteenth century was characterized by three divergent views towards women: that women were mentally and socially inferior to men, that they were equal but different, and that women were potentially equal in both mental ability and contribution to society. While individuals such as Jean-Jacques Rousseau believed women's roles were confined to motherhood and service to their male partners, the Enlightenment was a period in which women experienced expanded roles in the sciences.

The rise of salon culture in Europe brought philosophers and their conversation to an intimate setting where men and women met to discuss contemporary political, social, and scientific topics. While Jean-Jacques Rousseau attacked women-dominated salons as producing 'effeminate men' that stifled serious discourse, salons were characterized in this era by the mixing of the sexes.

Lady Mary Wortley Montagu defied convention by introducing smallpox inoculation through variolation to Western medicine after witnessing it during her travels in the Ottoman Empire. In 1718 Wortley Montague had her son inoculated and when in 1721 a smallpox epidemic struck England, she had her daughter inoculated. This was the first such operation done in Britain. She persuaded Caroline of Ansbach to test the treatment on prisoners. Princess Caroline subsequently inoculated her two daughters in 1722. Under a pseudonym, Wortley Montague published an article describing and advocating in favor of inoculation in September 1722.

After publicly defending forty nine theses in the Palazzo Pubblico, Laura Bassi was awarded a doctorate of philosophy in 1732 at the University of Bologna. Thus, Bassi became the second woman in the world to earn a philosophy doctorate after Elena Cornaro Piscopia in 1678, 54 years prior. She subsequently defended twelve additional theses at the Archiginnasio, the main building of the University of Bologna which allowed her to petition for a teaching position at the university. In 1732 the university granted Bassi's professorship in philosophy, making her a member of the Academy of the Sciences and the first woman to earn a professorship in physics at a university in Europe But the university held the value that women were to lead a private life and from 1746 to 1777 she gave only one formal dissertation per year ranging in topic from the problem of gravity to electricity. Because she could not lecture publicly at the university regularly, she began conducting private lessons and experiments from home in the year of 1749. However, due to her increase in responsibilities and public appearances on behalf of the university, Bassi was able to petition for regular pay increases, which in turn was used to pay for her advanced equipment. Bassi earned the highest salary paid by the University of Bologna of 1200 lire. In 1776, at the age of 65, she was appointed to the chair in experimental physics by the Bologna Institute of Sciences with her husband as a teaching assistant.

According to Britannica, Maria Gaetana Agnesi is "considered to be the first woman in the Western world to have achieved a reputation in mathematics." She is credited as the first woman to write a mathematics handbook, the Instituzioni analitiche ad uso della gioventù italiana, (Analytical Institutions for the Use of Italian Youth). Published in 1748 it "was regarded as the best introduction extant to the works of Euler." The goal of this work was, according to Agnesi herself, to give a systematic illustration of the different results and theorems of infinitesimal calculus. In 1750 she became the second woman to be granted a professorship at a European university. She was also appointed to the University of Bologna, though she never taught there.

The German Dorothea Erxleben was instructed in medicine by her father from an early age and Bassi's university professorship inspired Erxleben to fight for her right to practise medicine. In 1742 she published a tract arguing that women should be allowed to attend university. After being admitted to study by a dispensation of Frederick the Great, Erxleben received her M.D. from the University of Halle in 1754. She went on to analyse the obstacles preventing women from studying, among them housekeeping and children. She became the first female medical doctor in Germany.

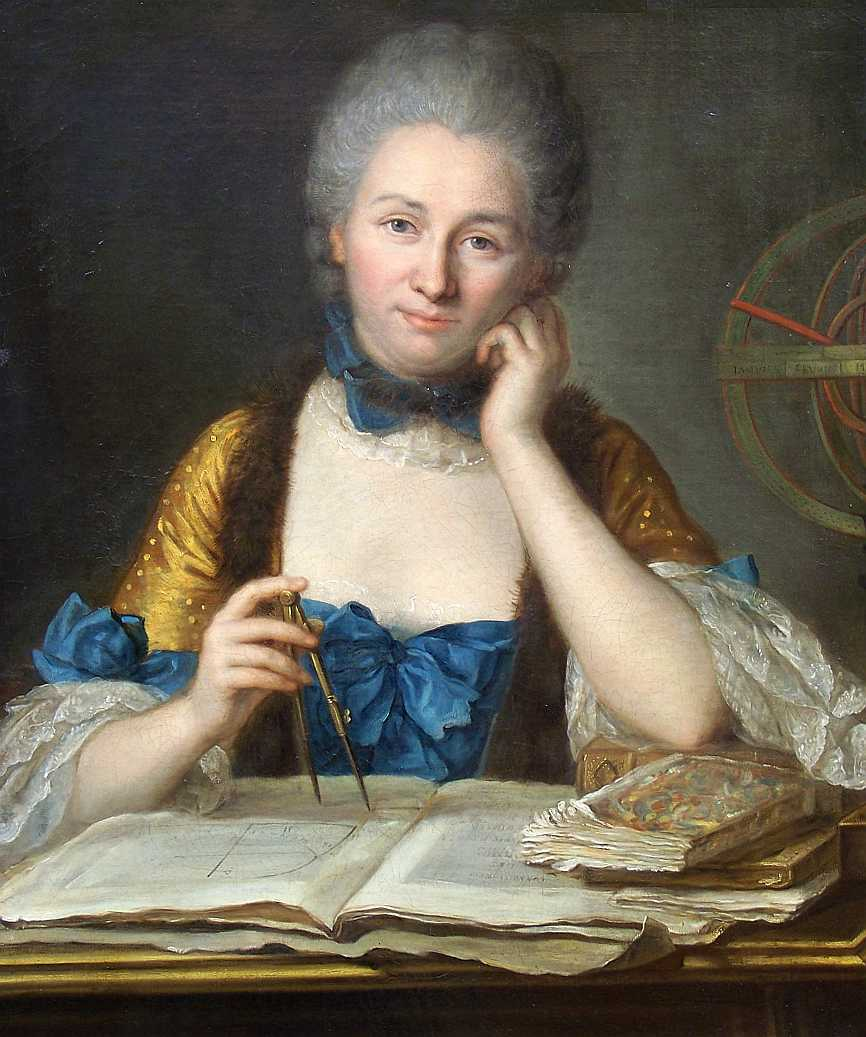
Émilie du Châtelet in her writings criticizes John Locke's philosophy and emphasizes the necessity of the verification of knowledge.

In 1741–42 Charlotta Frölich became the first woman to be published by the Royal Swedish Academy of Sciences with three books in agricultural science. In 1748 Eva Ekeblad became the first woman inducted into that academy. In 1746 Ekeblad had written to the academy about her discoveries of how to make flour and alcohol out of potatoes. Potatoes had been introduced into Sweden in 1658 but had been cultivated only in the greenhouses of the aristocracy. Ekeblad's work turned potatoes into a staple food in Sweden, and increased the supply of wheat, rye and barley available for making bread, since potatoes could be used instead to make alcohol. This greatly improved the country's eating habits and reduced the frequency of famines. Ekeblad also discovered a method of bleaching cotton textile and yarn with soap in 1751, and of replacing the dangerous ingredients in cosmetics of the time by using potato flour in 1752.

Émilie du Châtelet, a close friend of Voltaire, was the first scientist to appreciate the significance of kinetic energy, as opposed to momentum. She repeated and described the importance of an experiment originally devised by Willem 's Gravesande showing the impact of falling objects is proportional not to their velocity, but to the velocity squared. This understanding is considered to have made a profound contribution to Newtonian mechanics. In 1749 she completed the French translation of Newton's Philosophiae Naturalis Principia Mathematica (the Principia), including her derivation of the notion of conservation of energy from its principles of mechanics. Published ten years after her death, her translation and commentary of the Principia contributed to the completion of the Scientific Revolution in France and to its acceptance in Europe.

Marie-Anne Pierrette Paulze and her husband Antoine Lavoisier rebuilt the field of chemistry, which had its roots in alchemy and at the time was a convoluted science dominated by George Stahl's theory of phlogiston. Paulze accompanied Lavoisier in his lab, making entries into lab notebooks and sketching diagrams of his experimental designs. The training she had received allowed her to accurately and precisely draw experimental apparatuses, which ultimately helped many of Lavoisier's contemporaries to understand his methods and results. Paulze translated various works about phlogiston into French. One of her most important translations was that of Richard Kirwan's Essay on Phlogiston and the Constitution of Acids, which she both translated and critiqued, adding footnotes as she went along and pointing out errors in the chemistry made throughout the paper. Paulze was instrumental in the 1789 publication of Lavoisier's Elementary Treatise on Chemistry, which presented a unified view of chemistry as a field. This work proved pivotal in the progression of chemistry, as it presented the idea of conservation of mass as well as a list of elements and a new system for chemical nomenclature. She also kept strict records of the procedures followed, lending validity to the findings Lavoisier published.

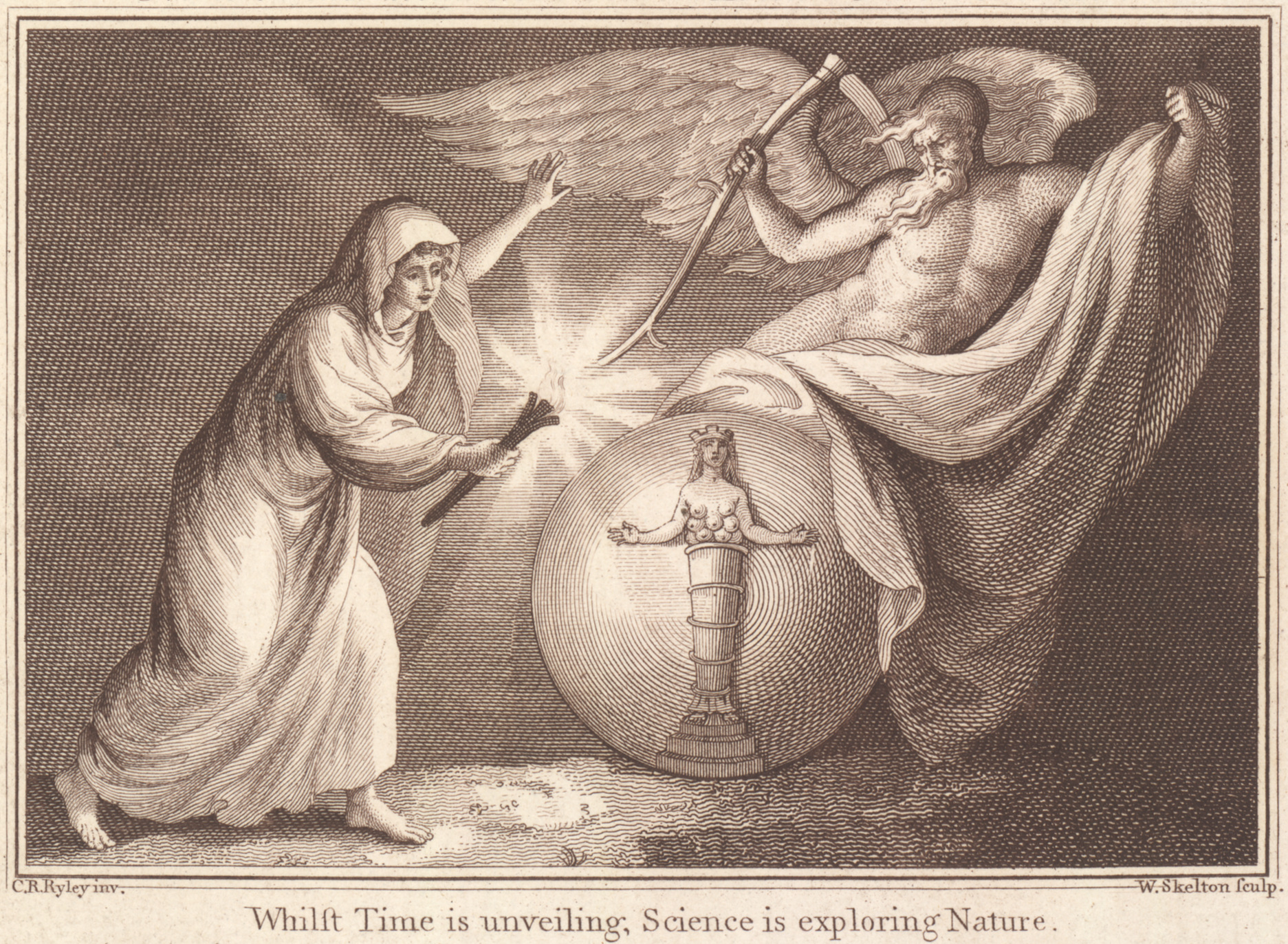
Science personified as a woman, illuminating nature with her light. Museum ticket from late eighteenth century.

The astronomer Caroline Herschel was born in Hanover but moved to England where she acted as an assistant to her brother, William Herschel. Throughout her writings, she repeatedly made it clear that she desired to earn an independent wage and be able to support herself. When the crown began paying her for her assistance to her brother in 1787, she became the first woman to do so at a time when even men rarely received wages for scientific enterprises – to receive a salary for services to science. During 1786–97 she discovered eight comets, the first on 1 August 1786. She had unquestioned priority as discoverer of five of the comets and rediscovered Comet Encke in 1795. Five of her comets were published in Philosophical Transactions, a packet of paper bearing the superscription, "This is what I call the Bills and Receipts of my Comets" contains some data connected with the discovery of each of these objects. William was summoned to Windsor Castle to demonstrate Caroline's comet to the royal family. Caroline Herschel is often credited as the first woman to discover a comet; however, Maria Kirch discovered a comet in the early 1700s, but is often overlooked because at the time, the discovery was attributed to her husband, Gottfried Kirch.

=== Nineteenth century ===
==== Early nineteenth century ====
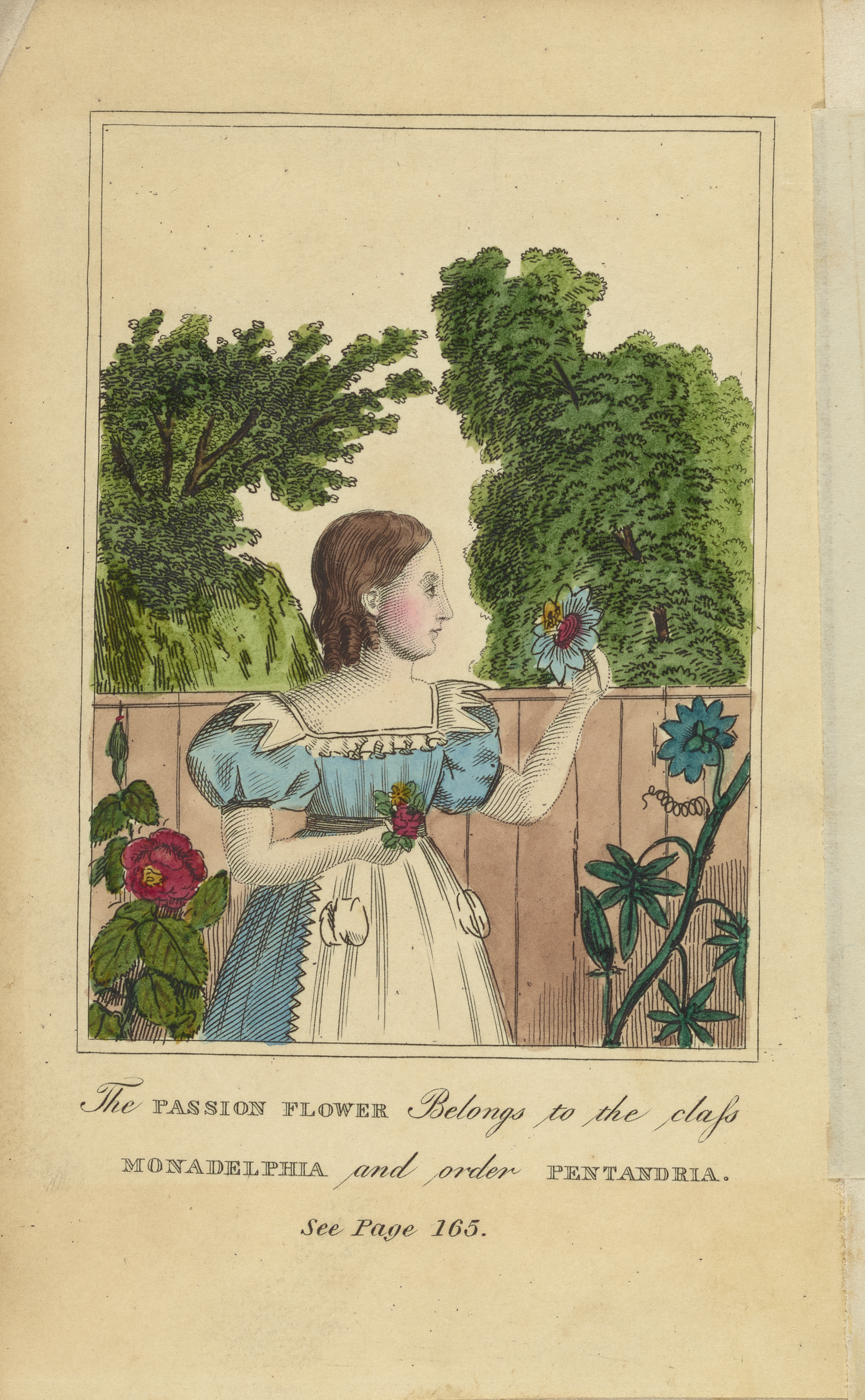
The Young Botanist, 1835

Science remained a largely amateur profession during the early part of the nineteenth century. Botany was considered a popular and fashionable activity, and one particularly suitable to women. In the later eighteenth and early nineteenth centuries, it was one of the most accessible areas of science for women in both England and North America.

However, as the nineteenth century progressed, botany and other sciences became increasingly professionalized, and women were increasingly excluded. Women's contributions were limited by their exclusion from most formal scientific education, but began to be recognized through their occasional admittance into learned societies during this period.

Scottish scientist Mary Fairfax Somerville carried out experiments in magnetism, presenting a paper entitled 'The Magnetic Properties of the Violet Rays of the Solar Spectrum' to the Royal Society in 1826, the second woman to do so. She also wrote several mathematical, astronomical, physical and geographical texts, and was a strong advocate for women's education. In 1835, she and Caroline Herschel were the first two women elected as Honorary Members of the Royal Astronomical Society.

English mathematician Ada, Lady Lovelace, a pupil of Somerville, corresponded with Charles Babbage about applications for his analytical engine. In her notes (1842–43) appended to her translation of Luigi Menabrea's article on the engine, she foresaw wide applications for it as a general-purpose computer, including composing music. She has been credited as writing the first computer program, though this has been disputed.

In Germany, institutes for "higher" education of women (Höhere Mädchenschule, in some regions called Lyzeum) were founded at the beginning of the century. The Deaconess Institute at Kaiserswerth was established in 1836 to instruct women in nursing. Elizabeth Fry visited the institute in 1840 and was inspired to found the London Institute of Nursing, and Florence Nightingale studied there in 1851.

In the US, Maria Mitchell made her name by discovering a comet in 1847, but also contributed calculations to the Nautical Almanac produced by the United States Naval Observatory. She became the first woman member of the American Academy of Arts and Sciences in 1848 and of the American Association for the Advancement of Science in 1850.

Other notable female scientists during this period include:

- in Britain, Mary Anning (paleontologist), Anna Atkins (botanist), Janet Taylor (astronomer), Penelope Steel (cartographer)
- in France, Marie-Sophie Germain (mathematician), Jeanne Villepreux-Power (marine biologist)

==== Late 19th century in western Europe ====
The latter part of the 19th century saw a rise in educational opportunities for women. Schools aiming to provide education for girls similar to that afforded to boys were founded in the UK, including the North London Collegiate School (1850), Cheltenham Ladies' College (1853) and the Girls' Public Day School Trust schools (from 1872). The first UK women's university college, Girton, was founded in 1869, and others soon followed: Newnham (1871) and Somerville (1879).

The Crimean War (1854–1856) contributed to establishing nursing as a profession, making Florence Nightingale a household name. A public subscription allowed Nightingale to establish a school of nursing in London in 1860, and schools following her principles were established throughout the UK. Nightingale was also a pioneer in public health as well as a statistician.

James Barry became the first British woman to gain a medical qualification in 1812, passing as a man. Elizabeth Garrett Anderson was the first openly female Briton to qualify medically, in 1865. With Sophia Jex-Blake, American Elizabeth Blackwell and others, Garret Anderson founded the first UK medical school to train women, the London School of Medicine for Women, in 1874.

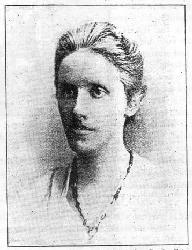
Annie Scott Dill Maunder

Annie Scott Dill Maunder was a pioneer in astronomical photography, especially of sunspots. A mathematics graduate of Girton College, Cambridge, she was first hired (in 1890) to be an assistant to Edward Walter Maunder, discoverer of the Maunder Minimum, the head of the solar department at Greenwich Observatory. They worked together to observe sunspots and to refine the techniques of solar photography. They married in 1895. Annie's mathematical skills made it possible to analyse the years of sunspot data that Maunder had been collecting at Greenwich. She also designed a small, portable wide-angle camera with a 1.5-inch-diameter (38 mm) lens. In 1898, the Maunders traveled to India, where Annie took the first photographs of the Sun's corona during a solar eclipse. By analysing the Cambridge records for both sunspots and geomagnetic storm, they were able to show that specific regions of the Sun's surface were the source of geomagnetic storms and that the Sun did not radiate its energy uniformly into space, as William Thomson, 1st Baron Kelvin had declared.

In Prussia women could go to university from 1894 and were allowed to receive a PhD. In 1908 all remaining restrictions for women were terminated.

Alphonse Rebière published a book in 1897, in France, entitled Les Femmes dans la science (Women in Science) which listed the contributions and publications of women in science.

Other notable female scientists during this period include:

- in Britain, Hertha Marks Ayrton (mathematician, engineer), Margaret Huggins (astronomer), Beatrix Potter (mycologist)
- in France, Dorothea Klumpke-Roberts (American-born astronomer)
- in Germany, Amalie Dietrich (naturalist), Agnes Pockels (physicist)
- in Russia and Sweden, Sofia Kovalevskaya (mathematician)

==== Late nineteenth-century Russians ====
In the second half of the 19th century, a large proportion of the most successful women in the STEM fields were Russians. Although many women received advanced training in medicine in the 1870s, in other fields women were barred and had to go to western Europe – mainly Switzerland – in order to pursue scientific studies. In her book about these "women of the [eighteen] sixties" (шестидесятницы), as they were called, Ann Hibner Koblitz writes:

To a large extent, women's higher education in continental Europe was pioneered by this first generation of Russian women. They were the first students in Zürich, Heidelberg, Leipzig, and elsewhere. Theirs were the first doctorates in medicine, chemistry, mathematics, and biology.

Among the successful scientists were Nadezhda Suslova (1843–1918), the first woman in the world to obtain a medical doctorate fully equivalent to men's degrees; Maria Bokova-Sechenova (1839–1929), a pioneer of women's medical education who received two doctoral degrees, one in medicine in Zürich and one in physiology in Vienna; Julia Lermontova (1846–1919), the first woman in the world to receive a doctoral degree in chemistry; the marine biologist Sofia Pereiaslavtseva (1849–1903), director of the Sevastopol Biological Station and winner of the Kessler Prize of the Russian Society of Natural Scientists; and the mathematician Sofia Kovalevskaia (1850–1891), the first woman in 19th century Europe to receive a doctorate in mathematics and the first to become a university professor in any field.

==== Late nineteenth century in the United States ====
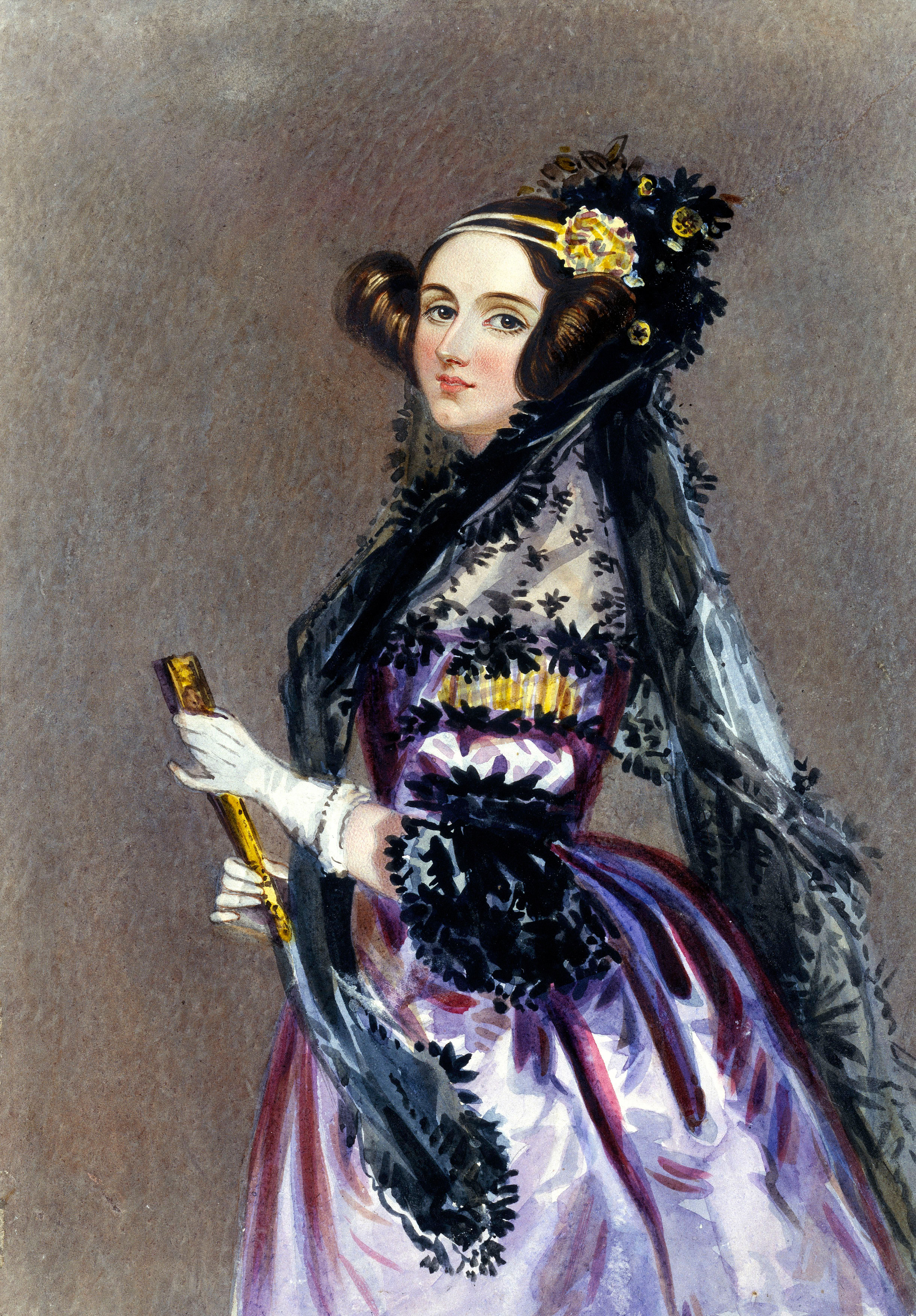
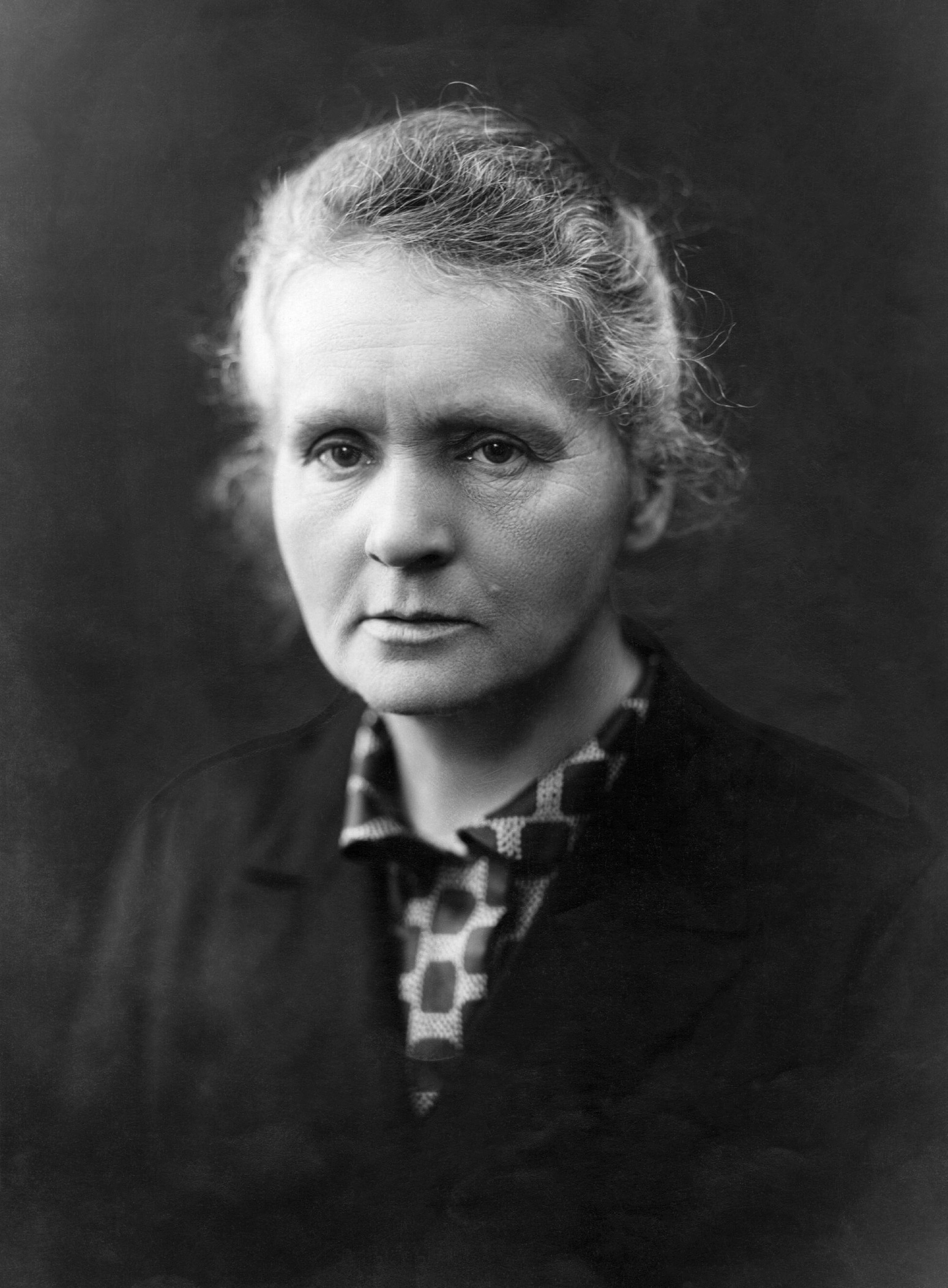
Influential female scientists born in the 19th century: Ada Lovelace and Marie Curie

In the later nineteenth century the rise of the women's college provided jobs for women scientists, and opportunities for education.

Women's colleges produced a disproportionate number of women who went on for PhDs in science. Many coeducational colleges and universities also opened or started to admit women during this period; such institutions included just over 3000 women in 1875, by 1900 numbered almost 20,000.

An example is Elizabeth Blackwell, who became the first certified female doctor in the US when she graduated from Geneva Medical College in 1849. With her sister, Emily Blackwell, and Marie Zakrzewska, Blackwell founded the New York Infirmary for Women and Children in 1857 and the first women's medical college in 1868, providing both training and clinical experience for women doctors. She also published several books on medical education for women.

In 1876, Elizabeth Bragg became the first woman to graduate with a civil engineering degree in the United States, from the University of California, Berkeley.

=== Early twentieth century ===
==== Europe before World War II ====
Marie Skłodowska-Curie, the first woman to win a Nobel prize in 1903 (physics), went on to become a double Nobel prize winner in 1911, both for her work on radiation. She was the first person to win two Nobel prizes, a feat accomplished by only four others since then. She also was the first woman to teach at Sorbonne University in Paris.

Alice Perry is understood to be the first woman to graduate with a degree in civil engineering in the then United Kingdom of Great Britain and Ireland, in 1906 at Queen's College, Galway, Ireland.

Lise Meitner played a major role in the discovery of nuclear fission. As head of the physics section at the Kaiser Wilhelm Institute in Berlin she collaborated closely with the head of chemistry Otto Hahn on atomic physics until forced to flee Berlin in 1938. In 1939, in collaboration with her nephew Otto Frisch, Meitner derived the theoretical explanation for an experiment performed by Hahn and Fritz Strassman in Berlin, thereby demonstrating the occurrence of nuclear fission. The possibility that Fermi's bombardment of uranium with neutrons in 1934 had instead produced fission by breaking up the nucleus into lighter elements, had actually first been raised in print in 1934, by chemist Ida Noddack (co-discover of the element rhenium), but this suggestion had been ignored at the time, as no group made a concerted effort to find any of these light radioactive fission products.

Maria Montessori was the first woman in Southern Europe to qualify as a physician. She developed an interest in the diseases of children and believed in the necessity of educating those recognized to be ineducable. In the case of the latter she argued for the development of training for teachers along Froebelian lines and developed the principle that was also to inform her general educational program, which is first the education of the senses, then the education of the intellect. Montessori introduced a teaching program that allowed defective children to read and write. She sought to teach skills not by having children repeatedly try it, but by developing exercises that prepare them.

Emmy Noether revolutionized abstract algebra, filled in gaps in relativity, and was responsible for a critical theorem about conserved quantities in physics. One notes that the Erlangen program attempted to identify invariants under a group of transformations. On 16 July 1918, before a scientific organization in Göttingen, Felix Klein read a paper written by Emmy Noether, because she was not allowed to present the paper herself. In particular, in what is referred to in physics as Noether's theorem, this paper identified the conditions under which the Poincaré group of transformations (now called a gauge group) for general relativity defines conservation laws. Noether's papers made the requirements for the conservation laws precise. Among mathematicians, Noether is best known for her fundamental contributions to abstract algebra, where the adjective noetherian is nowadays commonly used on many sorts of objects.

Mary Cartwright was a British mathematician who was the first to analyze a dynamical system with chaos. Inge Lehmann, a Danish seismologist, first suggested in 1936 that inside the Earth's molten core there may be a solid inner core. Women such as Margaret Fountaine continued to contribute detailed observations and illustrations in botany, entomology, and related observational fields. Joan Beauchamp Procter, an outstanding herpetologist, was the first woman curator of Reptiles for the Zoological Society of London at London Zoo.

Florence Sabin was an American medical scientist. Sabin was the first woman faculty member at Johns Hopkins in 1902, and the first woman full-time professor there in 1917. Her scientific and research experience is notable. Sabin published over 100 scientific papers and multiple books.

==== United States before and during World War II ====
Women moved into science in significant numbers by 1900, helped by the women's colleges and by opportunities at some of the new universities. Margaret Rossiter's books Women Scientists in America: Struggles and Strategies to 1940 and Women Scientists in America: Before Affirmative Action 1940–1972 provide an overview of this period, stressing the opportunities women found in separate women's work in science.

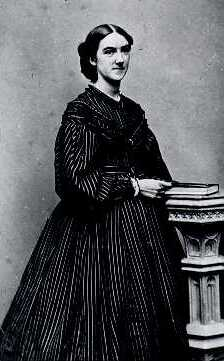
Ellen Swallow Richards

In 1892, Ellen Swallow Richards called for the "christening of a new science" – "oekology" (ecology) in a Boston lecture. This new science included the study of "consumer nutrition" and environmental education. This interdisciplinary branch of science was later specialized into what is currently known as ecology, while the consumer nutrition focus split off and was eventually relabeled as home economics, which provided another avenue for women to study science. Richards helped to form the American Home Economics Association, which published a journal, the Journal of Home Economics, and hosted conferences. Home economics departments were formed at many colleges, especially at land grant institutions. In her work at MIT, Ellen Richards also introduced the first biology course in its history as well as the focus area of sanitary engineering.

Women also found opportunities in botany and embryology. In psychology, women earned doctorates but were encouraged to specialize in educational and child psychology and to take jobs in clinical settings, such as hospitals and social welfare agencies.

In 1901, Annie Jump Cannon first noticed that it was a star's temperature that was the principal distinguishing feature among different spectra. This led to re-ordering of the ABC types by temperature instead of hydrogen absorption-line strength. Due to Cannon's work, most of the then-existing classes of stars were thrown out as redundant. Afterward, astronomy was left with the seven primary classes recognized today, in order: O, B, A, F, G, K, M; that has since been extended.

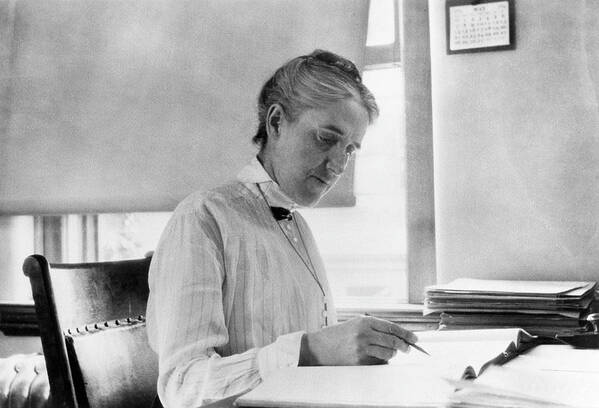
Henrietta Swan Leavitt made fundamental contributions to astronomy.

Henrietta Swan Leavitt first published her study of variable stars in 1908. This discovery became known as the "period–luminosity relation" of Cepheid variables, also known as Leavitt's Law. Our picture of the universe was changed forever, largely because of Leavitt's discovery.

The accomplishments of Edwin Hubble, renowned American astronomer, were made possible by Leavitt's groundbreaking research and Leavitt's Law. "If Henrietta Leavitt had provided the key to determine the size of the cosmos, then it was Edwin Powell Hubble who inserted it in the lock and provided the observations that allowed it to be turned", wrote David H. and Matthew D.H. Clark in their book Measuring the Cosmos.

Hubble often said that Leavitt deserved the Nobel for her work. Gösta Mittag-Leffler of the Swedish Academy of Sciences had begun paperwork on her nomination in 1924, only to learn that she had died of cancer three years earlier (the Nobel prize cannot be awarded posthumously).

In 1925, Harvard graduate student Cecilia Payne-Gaposchkin demonstrated for the first time from existing evidence on the spectra of stars that stars were made up almost exclusively of hydrogen and helium, one of the most fundamental theories in stellar astrophysics.

Canadian-born Maud Menten worked in the US and Germany. Her most famous work was on enzyme kinetics together with Leonor Michaelis, based on earlier findings of Victor Henri. This resulted in the Michaelis–Menten equations. Menten also invented the azo-dye coupling reaction for alkaline phosphatase, which is still used in histochemistry. She characterised bacterial toxins from B. paratyphosus, Streptococcus scarlatina and Salmonella ssp., and conducted the first electrophoretic separation of proteins in 1944. She worked on the properties of hemoglobin, regulation of blood sugar level, and kidney function.

World War II brought some new opportunities. The Office of Scientific Research and Development, under Vannevar Bush, began in 1941 to keep a registry of men and women trained in the sciences. Because there was a shortage of workers, some women were able to work in jobs they might not otherwise have accessed. Many women worked on the Manhattan Project or on scientific projects for the United States military services. Women who worked on the Manhattan Project included Leona Woods Marshall, Katharine Way, and Chien-Shiung Wu. It was actually Wu who confirmed Enrico Fermi's hypothesis through her earlier draft that Xe-135 impeded the B reactor from working. The adjustments made would quickly let the project resume its course.

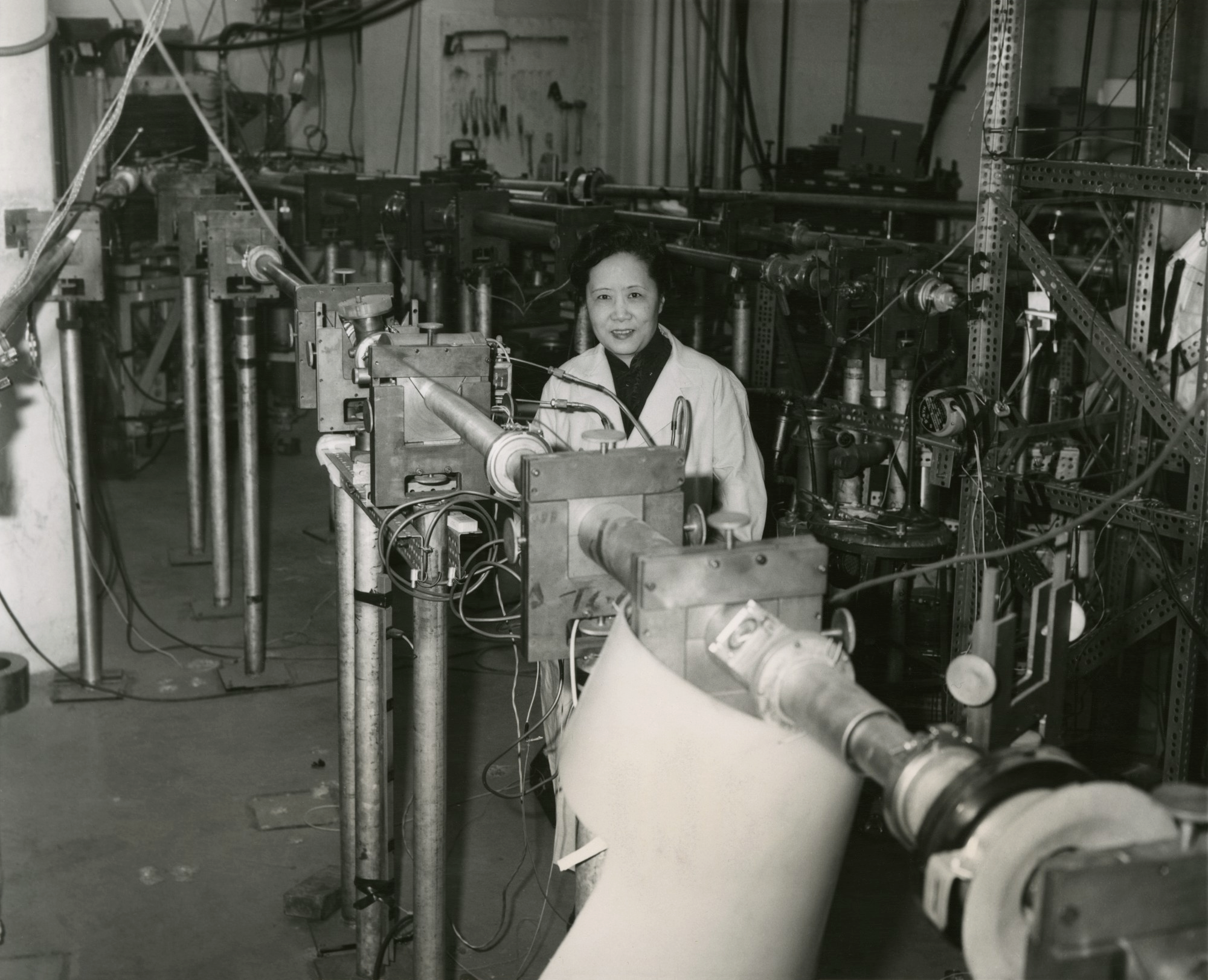
Chien-Shiung Wu, who verified the problem with Xenon in the B nuclear reactor for the Manhattan Project's physicists and engineers

Wu would later also confirm Albert Einstein's EPR Paradox in the first experimental corroboration, and prove the first violation of Parity and Charge Conjugate Symmetry, thereby laying the conceptual basis for the future Standard Model of Particle Physics, and the rapid development of the new field.

Women in other disciplines looked for ways to apply their expertise to the war effort. Three nutritionists, Lydia J. Roberts, Hazel K. Stiebeling, and Helen S. Mitchell, developed the Recommended Dietary Allowance in 1941 to help military and civilian groups make plans for group feeding situations. The RDAs proved necessary, especially, once foods began to be rationed. Rachel Carson worked for the United States Bureau of Fisheries, writing brochures to encourage Americans to consume a wider variety of fish and seafood. She also contributed to research to assist the Navy in developing techniques and equipment for submarine detection.

Women in psychology formed the National Council of Women Psychologists, which organized projects related to the war effort. The NCWP elected Florence Laura Goodenough president. In the social sciences, several women contributed to the Japanese Evacuation and Resettlement Study, based at the University of California. This study was led by sociologist Dorothy Swaine Thomas, who directed the project and synthesized information from her informants, mostly graduate students in anthropology. These included Tamie Tsuchiyama, the only Japanese-American woman to contribute to the study, and Rosalie Hankey Wax.

In the United States Navy, female scientists conducted a wide range of research. Mary Sears, a planktonologist, researched military oceanographic techniques as head of the Hydgrographic Office's Oceanographic Unit. Florence van Straten, a chemist, worked as an aerological engineer. She studied the effects of weather on military combat. Grace Hopper, a mathematician, became one of the first computer programmers for the Mark I computer. Mina Spiegel Rees, also a mathematician, was the chief technical aide for the Applied Mathematics Panel of the National Defense Research Committee.

Gerty Cori was a biochemist who discovered the mechanism by which glycogen, a derivative of glucose, is transformed in the muscles to form lactic acid, and is later reformed as a way to store energy. For this discovery she and her colleagues were awarded the Nobel prize in 1947, making her the third woman and the first American woman to win a Nobel Prize in science. She was the first woman ever to be awarded the Nobel Prize in Physiology or Medicine. Cori is among several scientists whose works are commemorated by a U.S. postage stamp.

=== Late 20th century to early 21st century ===
Deborah Kariuki, President of WICyS mid-Atlantic chapter, Assistant Teaching Professor at University of Maryland in Baltimore County. She is a software engineer and certified ethical hacker.

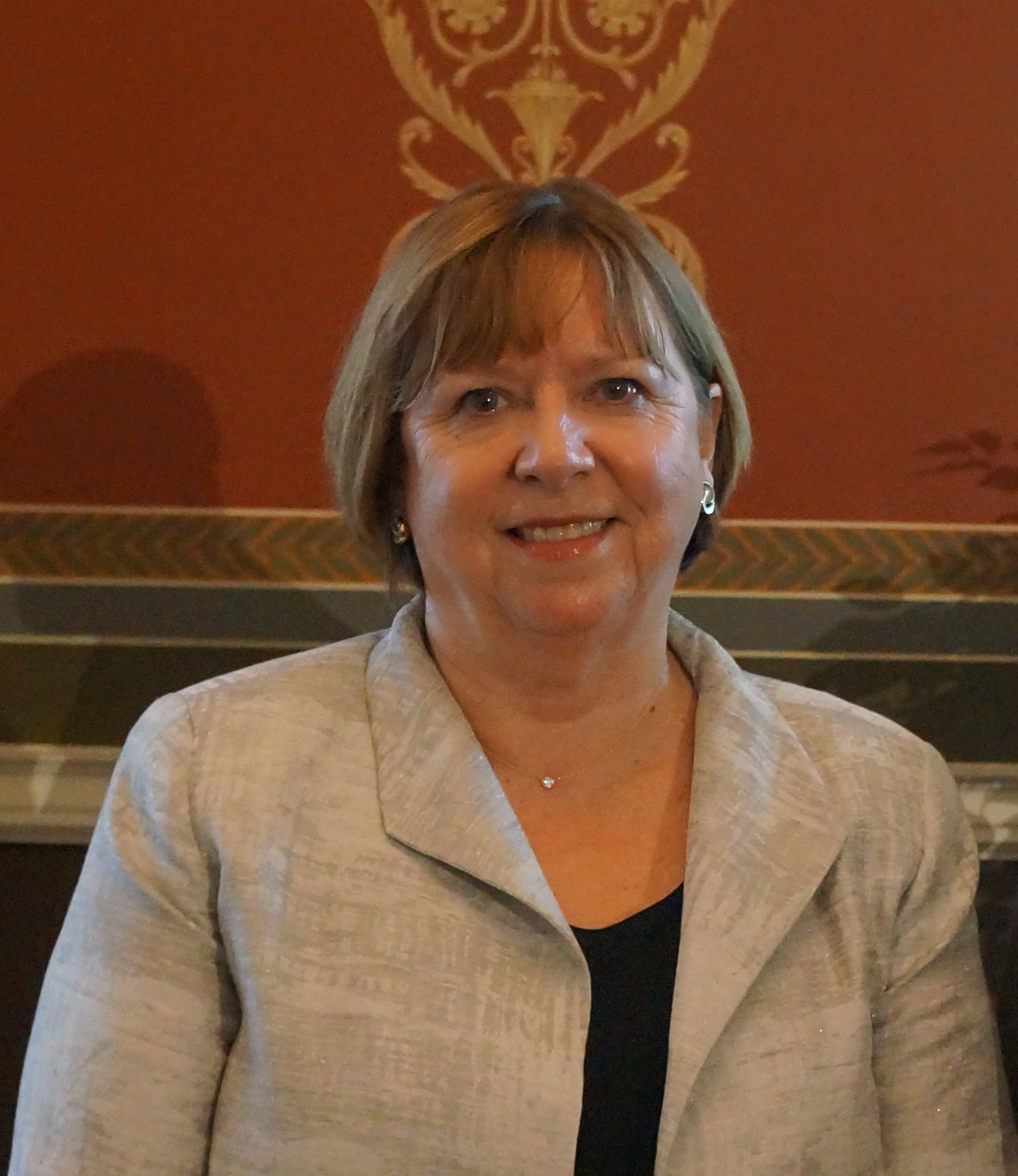
At the Saving the Web: The Ethics and Challenges of Preserving What's on the Internet at Room LJ-119, Thomas Jefferson Building, Library of Congress, at the Kluge Center, on 14, 15 and 16 June 2016, Dame Wendy Hall

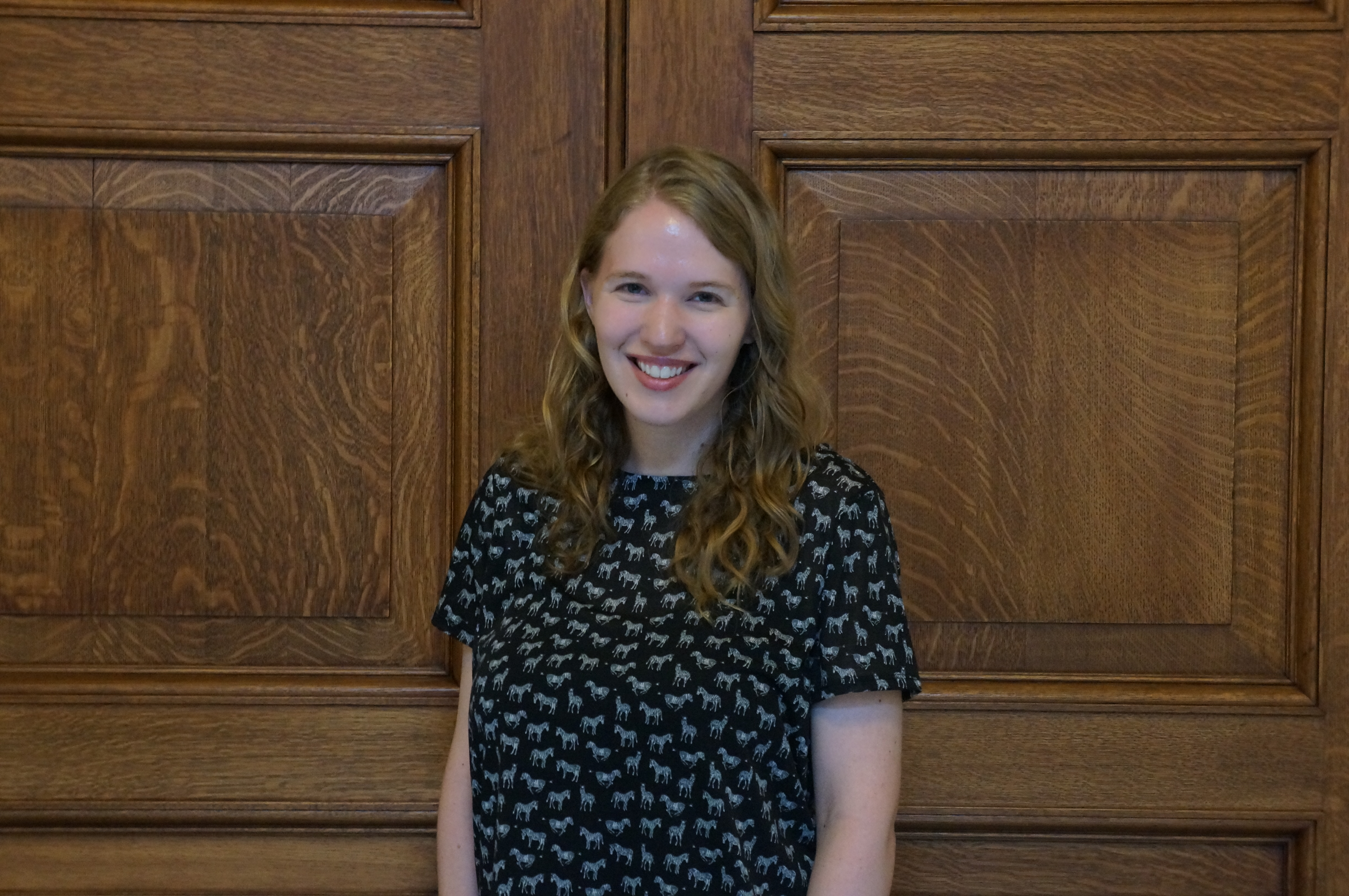
At the Saving the Web: The Ethics and Challenges of Preserving What's on the Internet at Room LJ-119, Thomas Jefferson Building, Library of Congress, at the Kluge Center, on 14, 15 and 16 June 2016, Allison Hegel, a computer scientist and data scientist

Nina Byers notes that before 1976, fundamental contributions of women to physics were rarely acknowledged. Women worked unpaid or in positions lacking the status they deserved.

In the early 1980s, Margaret Rossiter presented two concepts for understanding the statistics behind women in science as well as the disadvantages women continued to suffer. She coined the terms "hierarchical segregation" and "territorial segregation." The former term describes the phenomenon in which the further one goes up the chain of command in the field, the smaller the presence of women. The latter describes the phenomenon in which women "cluster in scientific disciplines."

A recent book titled Athena Unbound provides a life-course analysis (based on interviews and surveys) of women in science from early childhood interest, through university, graduate school and the academic workplace. The thesis of this book is that "Women face a special series of gender-related barriers to entry and success in scientific careers that persist, despite recent advances".

The L'Oréal-UNESCO Awards for Women in Science were set up in 1998, with prizes alternating each year between the materials science and life sciences. One award is given for each geographical region of Africa and the Middle East, Asia-Pacific, Europe, Latin America and the Caribbean, and North America. By 2017, these awards had recognized almost 100 laureates from 30 countries. Two of the laureates have gone on to win the Nobel Prize, Ada Yonath (2008) and Elizabeth Blackburn (2009). Fifteen promising young researchers also receive an International Rising Talent fellowship each year within this programme.

By the early twenty-first century, the number of women receiving major scientific awards had increased, although women remained underrepresented among Nobel Prize laureates in physics, chemistry, and physiology or medicine. Several women scientists received Nobel Prizes in the 2020s, including Emmanuelle Charpentier and Jennifer Doudna, who were awarded the 2020 Nobel Prize in Chemistry for the development of CRISPR gene-editing technology.

==== Europe after World War II ====
South-African born physicist and radiobiologist Tikvah Alper(1909–95), working in the UK, developed many fundamental insights into biological mechanisms, including the (negative) discovery that the infective agent in scrapie could not be a virus or other eukaryotic structure.

French virologist Françoise Barré-Sinoussi performed some of the fundamental work in the identification of the human immunodeficiency virus (HIV) as the cause of AIDS, for which she shared the 2008 Nobel Prize in Physiology or Medicine.

In July 1967, Jocelyn Bell Burnell discovered evidence for the first known radio pulsar, which resulted in the 1974 Nobel Prize in Physics for her supervisor. She was president of the Institute of Physics from October 2008 until October 2010.

Astrophysicist Margaret Burbidge was a member of the B^{2}FH group responsible for originating the theory of stellar nucleosynthesis, which explains how elements are formed in stars. She has held a number of prestigious posts, including the directorship of the Royal Greenwich Observatory.

Mary Cartwright was a mathematician and student of G. H. Hardy. Her work on nonlinear differential equations was influential in the field of dynamical systems.

Rosalind Franklin was a crystallographer, whose work helped to elucidate the fine structures of coal, graphite, DNA and viruses. In 1953, the work she did on DNA allowed Watson and Crick to conceive their model of the structure of DNA. Her photograph of DNA gave Watson and Crick a basis for their DNA research, and they were awarded the Nobel Prize without giving due credit to Franklin, who had died of cancer in 1958.

Jane Goodall is a British primatologist considered to be the world's foremost expert on chimpanzees and is best known for her over 55-year study of social and family interactions of wild chimpanzees. She is the founder of the Jane Goodall Institute and the Roots & Shoots programme.

Dorothy Hodgkin analyzed the molecular structure of complex chemicals by studying diffraction patterns caused by passing X-rays through crystals. She won the 1964 Nobel prize for chemistry for discovering the structure of vitamin B_{12}, becoming the third woman to win the prize for chemistry.

Irène Joliot-Curie, daughter of Marie Curie, won the 1935 Nobel Prize for chemistry with her husband Frédéric Joliot for their work in radioactive isotopes leading to nuclear fission. This made the Curies the family with the most Nobel laureates to date.

Palaeoanthropologist Mary Leakey discovered the first skull of a fossil ape on Rusinga Island and also a noted robust Australopithecine.

Italian neurologist Rita Levi-Montalcini received the 1986 Nobel Prize in Physiology or Medicine for the discovery of nerve growth factor (NGF). Her work allowed for a further potential understanding of different diseases such as tumors, delayed healing, malformations, and others. This research led to her winning the Nobel Prize for Physiology or Medicine alongside Stanley Cohen in 1986. While making advancements in medicine and science, Rita Levi-Montalcini was also active politically throughout her life. She was appointed a Senator for Life in the Italian Senate in 2001 and is the oldest Nobel laureate ever to have lived.

Zoologist Anne McLaren conducted studied in genetics which led to advances in in vitro fertilization. She became the first female officer of the Royal Society in 331 years.

Christiane Nüsslein-Volhard received the Nobel Prize in Physiology or Medicine in 1995 for research on the genetic control of embryonic development. She also started the Christiane Nüsslein-Volhard Foundation (Christiane Nüsslein-Volhard Stiftung), to aid promising young female German scientists with children.

Bertha Swirles was a theoretical physicist who made a number of contributions to early quantum theory. She co-authored the well-known textbook Methods of Mathematical Physics with her husband Sir Harold Jeffreys.

==== United States after World War II ====
Immediately after the end of World War II, the country saw a "retrenchment of positions for women" as male veterans returned and began filling open job positions. While men benefited from the opportunities of the G.I. Bill, some women had success with programs such as Women Accepted for Volunteer Emergency Service (WAVES), a women's branch of the US Navy Reserve. The Society of Women Engineers held their first meeting in 1950. Although NASA was established in 1958, women were only admitted to the astronaut program in 1983, 25 years later.

Kay McNulty, Betty Jennings, Betty Snyder, Marlyn Wescoff, Fran Bilas and Ruth Lichterman were six of the original programmers for the ENIAC, the first general purpose electronic computer.

Linda B. Buck is a neurobiologist who was awarded the 2004 Nobel Prize in Physiology or Medicine along with Richard Axel for their work on olfactory receptors.

Rachel Carson was a marine biologist from the United States. She is credited with being the founder of the environmental movement. The biologist and activist published Silent Spring, a work on the dangers of pesticides, in 1962. The publishing of her environmental science book led to the questioning of usage of harmful pesticides and other chemicals in agricultural settings. This led to a campaign to attempt to ultimately discredit Carson. However, the federal government called for a review of DDT which concluded with DDT being banned in the United States. Carson later died from cancer in 1964 at 57 years old.

Eugenie Clark, popularly known as The Shark Lady, was an American ichthyologist known for her research on poisonous fish of the tropical seas and on the behavior of sharks.

Ann Druyan is an American writer, lecturer and producer specializing in cosmology and popular science. Druyan has credited her knowledge of science to the 20 years she spent studying with her late husband, Carl Sagan, rather than formal academic training. She was responsible for the selection of music on the Voyager Golden Record for the Voyager 1 and Voyager 2 exploratory missions. Druyan also sponsored the Cosmos 1 spacecraft.

Gertrude B. Elion was an American biochemist and pharmacologist, awarded the Nobel Prize in Physiology or Medicine in 1988 for her work on the differences in biochemistry between normal human cells and pathogens.

Sandra Moore Faber, with Robert Jackson, discovered the Faber–Jackson relation between luminosity and stellar dispersion velocity in elliptical galaxies. She also headed the team which discovered the Great Attractor, a large concentration of mass which is pulling a number of nearby galaxies in its direction.

Zoologist Dian Fossey worked with gorillas in Africa from 1967 until her murder in 1985.

Astronomer Andrea Ghez received a MacArthur "genius grant" in 2008 for her work in surmounting the limitations of earthbound telescopes.

Maria Goeppert Mayer was the second female Nobel Prize winner in Physics, for proposing the nuclear shell model of the atomic nucleus. Earlier in her career, she had worked in unofficial or volunteer positions at the university where her husband was a professor. Goeppert Mayer is one of several scientists whose works are commemorated by a U.S. postage stamp.

Sulamith Low Goldhaber and her husband Gerson Goldhaber formed a research team on the K meson and other high-energy particles in the 1950s.

Carol Greider and the Australian born Elizabeth Blackburn, along with Jack W. Szostak, received the 2009 Nobel Prize in Physiology or Medicine for the discovery of how chromosomes are protected by telomeres and the enzyme telomerase.

Rear Admiral Grace Murray Hopper developed the first computer compiler while working for the Eckert Mauchly Computer Corporation, released in 1952.

Deborah S. Jin's team at JILA, in Boulder, Colorado, in 2003 produced the first fermionic condensate, a new state of matter.

Stephanie Kwolek, a researcher at DuPont, invented poly-paraphenylene terephthalamide – better known as Kevlar.

Lynn Margulis is a biologist best known for her work on endosymbiotic theory, which is now generally accepted for how certain organelles were formed.

Barbara McClintock's studies of maize genetics demonstrated genetic transposition in the 1940s and 1950s. Before then, McClintock obtained her PhD from Cornell University in 1927. Her discovery of transposition provided a greater understanding of mobile loci within chromosomes and the ability for genetics to be fluid. She dedicated her life to her research, and she was awarded the Nobel Prize in Physiology or Medicine in 1983. McClintock was the first American woman to receive a Nobel Prize that was not shared by anyone else. McClintock is one of several scientists whose works are commemorated by a U.S. postage stamp.

Nita Ahuja is a renowned surgeon-scientist known for her work on CIMP in cancer, she is currently the chief of surgical oncology at Johns Hopkins Hospital. First woman ever to be the chief of this prestigious department.

Carolyn Porco is a planetary scientist best known for her work on the Voyager program and the Cassini–Huygens mission to Saturn. She is also known for her popularization of science, in particular space exploration.

Physicist Helen Quinn, with Roberto Peccei, postulated Peccei-Quinn symmetry. One consequence is a particle known as the axion, a candidate for the dark matter that pervades the universe. Quinn was the first woman to receive the Dirac Medal by the International Centre for Theoretical Physics (ICTP) and the first to receive the Oskar Klein Medal.

Lisa Randall is a theoretical physicist and cosmologist, best known for her work on the Randall–Sundrum model. She was the first tenured female physics professor at Princeton University.

Sally Ride was an astrophysicist and the first American woman, and then-youngest American, to travel to outer space. Ride wrote or co-wrote several books on space aimed at children, with the goal of encouraging them to study science. Ride participated in the Gravity Probe B (GP-B) project, which provided more evidence that the predictions of Albert Einstein's general theory of relativity are correct.

Through her observations of galaxy rotation curves, astronomer Vera Rubin discovered the Galaxy rotation problem, now taken to be one of the key pieces of evidence for the existence of dark matter. She was the first female allowed to observe at the Palomar Observatory.

Sara Seager is a Canadian-American astronomer who is currently a professor at the Massachusetts Institute of Technology and known for her work on extrasolar planets.

Astronomer Jill Tarter is best known for her work on the search for extraterrestrial intelligence. Tarter was named one of the 100 most influential people in the world by Time Magazine in 2004. She is the former director of SETI.

Rosalyn Yalow was the co-winner of the 1977 Nobel Prize in Physiology or Medicine (together with Roger Guillemin and Andrew Schally) for development of the radioimmunoassay (RIA) technique.

==== Australia after World War II ====
- Amanda Barnard, an Australia-based theoretical physicist specializing in nanomaterials, winner of the Malcolm McIntosh Prize for Physical Scientist of the Year.
- Isobel Bennett, was one of the first women to go to Macquarie Island with the Australian National Antarctic Research Expeditions (ANARE). She is one of Australia's best known marine biologists.
- Dorothy Hill, an Australian geologist who became the first female professor at an Australian university.
- Ruby Payne-Scott, was an Australian who was an early leader in the fields of radio astronomy and radiophysics. She was one of the first radio astronomers and the first woman in the field.
- Penny Sackett, an astronomer who became the first female chief scientist of Australia in 2008. She is a US-born Australian citizen.
- Fiona Stanley, winner of the 2003 Australian of the Year award, is an epidemiologist noted for her research into child and maternal health, birth disorders, and her work in the public health field.
- Michelle Simmons, winner of the 2018 Australian of the Year award, is a quantum physicist known for her research and leadership on atomic-scale silicon quantum devices.

==== Israel after World War II ====
- Ada Yonath, the first woman from the Middle East to win a Nobel prize in the sciences, was awarded the Nobel Prize in Chemistry in 2009 for her studies on the structure and function of the ribosome.

Latin America

Maria Nieves Garcia-Casal, the first scientist and nutritionist woman from Latin America to lead the Latin America Society of Nutrition.

Angela Restrepo Moreno is a microbiologist from Colombia. She first gained interest in tiny organisms when she had the opportunity to view them through a microscope that belonged to her grandfather. While Restrepo has a variety of research, her main area of research is fungi and their causes of diseases. Her work led her to develop research on a disease caused by fungi that has only been diagnosed in Latin America but was originally found in Brazil: Paracoccidioidomycosis. Research groups also developed by Restrepo have begun studying two routes: the relationship between humans, fungi, and the environment and also how the cells within the fungi work.

Along with her research, Restrepo co-founded a non-profit that is devoted to scientific research named Corporation for Biological Research (CIB). Angela Restrepo Moreno was awarded the SCOPUS Prize in 2007 for her numerous publications. She currently resides in Colombia and continues her research.

Susana López Charretón was born in Mexico City, Mexico in 1957. She is a virologist whose area of study focused on the rotavirus. When she initially began studying rotavirus, it had only been discovered four years earlier. Charretón's main job was to study how the virus entered cells and its ways of multiplying. Because of her, and several others, work other scientists were able to learn about more details of the virus. Now, her research focuses on the virus's ability to recognize the cells it infects. Along with her husband, Charretón was awarded the Carlos J. Finlay Prize for Microbiology in 2001. She also received the Loreal-UNESCO prize titled "Woman in Science" in 2012. Charretón has also received several other awards for her research.

Liliana Quintanar Vera is a Mexican chemist. Currently a researcher at the Department of Chemistry of the Center of Investigation and Advanced Studies, Vera's research currently focuses on neurodegenerative diseases like Parkinson's, Alzheimer's, and prion disease and also on degenerative diseases like diabetes and cataracts. For this research she focused on how copper interacts with the proteins of the neurodegenerative diseases mentioned before.

Liliana's awards include the Mexican Academy of Sciences Research Prize for Science in 2017, the Marcos Moshinsky Chair award in 2016, the Fulbright Scholarship in 2014, and the L'Oréal-UNESCO For Women in Science Award in 2007.

== Nobel laureates ==
The Nobel Prize and Prize in Economic Sciences have been awarded to women 61 times between 1901 and 2022. One woman, Marie Sklodowska-Curie, has been honored twice, with the 1903 Nobel Prize in Physics and the 1911 Nobel Prize in Chemistry. This means that 60 women in total have been awarded the Nobel Prize between 1901 and 2022. 25 women have been awarded the Nobel Prize in physics, chemistry, physiology or medicine.

=== Chemistry ===
- 2022 – Carolyn Bertozzi
- 2020 – Emmanuelle Charpentier, Jennifer Doudna
- 2018 – Frances Arnold
- 2009 – Ada E. Yonath
- 1964 – Dorothy Crowfoot Hodgkin
- 1935 – Irène Joliot-Curie
- 1911 – Marie Sklodowska-Curie

=== Physics ===
- 2023 – Anne L'Huillier
- 2020 – Andrea Ghez
- 2018 – Donna Strickland
- 1963 – Maria Goeppert-Mayer
- 1903 – Marie Sklodowska-Curie

=== Physiology or Medicine ===
- 2023 – Katalin Karikó
- 2015 – Youyou Tu
- 2014 – May-Britt Moser
- 2009 – Elizabeth H. Blackburn
- 2009 – Carol W. Greider
- 2008 – Françoise Barré-Sinoussi
- 2004 – Linda B. Buck
- 1995 – Christiane Nüsslein-Volhard
- 1988 – Gertrude B. Elion
- 1986 – Rita Levi-Montalcini
- 1983 – Barbara McClintock
- 1977 – Rosalyn Yalow
- 1947 – Gerty Cori

== Fields Medal ==
- 2014 – Maryam Mirzakhani (1977–2017), the first woman to have won the prize, was an Iranian mathematician and a professor of mathematics at Stanford University.
- 2022 – Maryna Viazovska.
- 2026 – Hong Wang.

== Statistics ==
Statistics are used to indicate disadvantages faced by women in science, and also to track positive changes of employment opportunities and incomes for women in science.

=== Situation in the 1990s ===
Women appear to do less well than men (in terms of degree, rank, and salary) in the fields that have been traditionally dominated by women, such as nursing. In 1991 women attributed 91% of the PhDs in nursing, and men held 4% of full professorships in nursing. In the field of psychology, where women earn the majority of PhDs, women do not fill the majority of high rank positions in that field.

Women's lower salaries in the scientific community are also reflected in statistics. According to the data provided in 1993, the median salaries of female scientists and engineers with doctoral degrees were 20% less than men. This data can be explained as there was less participation of women in high rank scientific fields/positions and a female majority in low-paid fields/positions. However, even with men and women in the same scientific community field, women are typically paid 15–17% less than men. In addition to the gender gap, there were also salary differences between ethnicity: African-American women with more years of experiences earn 3.4% less than European-American women with similar skills, while Asian women engineers out-earn both Africans and Europeans.

Women are also under-represented in the sciences as compared to their numbers in the overall working population. Within 11% of African-American women in the workforce, 3% are employed as scientists and engineers. Hispanics made up 8% of the total workers in the US, 3% of that number are scientists and engineers. Native Americans participation cannot be statistically measured.

Women tend to earn less than men in almost all industries, including government and academia. Women are less likely to be hired in highest-paid positions. The data showing the differences in salaries, ranks, and overall success between the genders is often claimed to be a result of women's lack of professional experience. The rate of women's professional achievement is increasing. In 1996, the salaries for women in professional fields increased from 85% to 95% relative to men with similar skills and jobs. Young women between the age of 27 and 33 earned 98%, nearly as much as their male peers. In the total workforce of the United States, women earn 74% as much as their male counterparts (in the 1970s they made 59% as much as their male counterparts).

Claudia Goldin, Harvard concludes in A Grand Gender Convergence: Its Last Chapter – "The gender gap in pay would be considerably reduced and might vanish altogether if firms did not have an incentive to disproportionately reward individuals who labored long hours and worked particular hours."

Research on women's participation in the "hard" sciences such as physics and computer science speaks of the "leaky pipeline" model, in which the proportion of women "on track" to potentially becoming top scientists fall off at every step of the way, from getting interested in science and maths in elementary school, through doctorate, postdoctoral, and career steps. The leaky pipeline also applies in other fields. In biology, for instance, women in the United States have been getting Masters degrees in the same numbers as men for two decades, yet fewer women get PhDs; and the numbers of women principal investigators have not risen.

It is important to determine what may be causing this "leaky pipeline" by looking at factors outside of academia that are occurring in women's lives at the same time as they are pursuing their continued education and career search. At this crucial time the most outstanding factor is family formation. As women continue their academic careers, they are often also stepping into new roles as wives and mothers. These traditionally require a large time commitment and cause difficulties for an individual looking to attain tenure. It's been found that women entering the family formation period of their life are 35% less likely than their male counterparts to pursue tenure positions after receiving their PhD's.

In the UK, women occupied over half the places in science-related higher education courses (science, medicine, maths, computer science and engineering) in 2004–05. However, gender differences varied from subject to subject: women substantially outnumbered men in biology and medicine, especially nursing, while men predominated in maths, physical sciences, computer science and engineering.

In the US, women with science or engineering doctoral degrees were predominantly employed in the education sector in 2001, with substantially fewer employed in business or industry than men. According to salary figures reported in 1991, women earn anywhere between 83.6 percent to 87.5 percent that of a man's salary. An even greater disparity between men and women is the ongoing trend that women scientists with more experience are not as well-compensated as their male counterparts. The salary of a male engineer continues to experience growth as he gains experience whereas the female engineer sees her salary reach a plateau.

Women, in the United States and many European countries, who succeed in science tend to be graduates of single-sex schools. Women earn 54% of all bachelor's degrees in the United States and 50% of those are in science. 9% of US physicists are women.

=== Overview of situation in 2013 ===
The leaky pipeline, share of women in higher education and research worldwide, 2013. Source: UNESCO Science Report: towards 2030, Figure 3.3, data from UNESCO Institute for Statistics.

In 2013, women accounted for 53% of the world's graduates at the bachelor's and master's level and 43% of successful PhD candidates but just 28% of researchers. Women graduates are consistently highly represented in the life sciences, often at over 50%. However, their representation in the other fields is inconsistent. In North America and much of Europe, few women graduate in physics, mathematics and computer science but, in other regions, the proportion of women may be close to parity in physics or mathematics. In engineering and computer sciences, women consistently trail men, a situation that is particularly acute in many high-income countries.

Share of women in selected South African institutions in 2011. Source: UNESCO Science Report: towards 2030, based on a 2011 study by the Academy of Sciences of South Africa on the Participation of Girls and Women in the National STI System in South Africa.

==== In decision-making ====
As of 2015, each step up the ladder of the scientific research system saw a drop in female participation until, at the highest echelons of scientific research and decision-making, there were very few women left. In 2015, the EU Commissioner for Research, Science and Innovation Carlos Moedas called attention to this phenomenon, adding that the majority of entrepreneurs in science and engineering tended to be men. In 2013, the German government coalition agreement introduced a 30% quota for women on company boards of directors.

In 2010, women made up 14% of university chancellors and vice-chancellors at Brazilian public universities and 17% of those in South Africa in 2011. As of 2015, in Argentina, women made up 16% of directors and vice-directors of national research centres and, in Mexico, 10% of directors of scientific research institutes at the National Autonomous University of Mexico. In the US, numbers are slightly higher at 23%. In the EU, less than 16% of tertiary institutions were headed by a woman in 2010 and just 10% of universities. In 2011, at the main tertiary institution for the English-speaking Caribbean, the University of the West Indies, women represented 51% of lecturers but only 32% of senior lecturers and 26% of full professors . A 2018 review of the Royal Society of Britain by historians Aileen Fyfe and Camilla Mørk Røstvik produced similarly low numbers, with women accounting for more than 25% of members in only a handful of countries, including Cuba, Panama and South Africa. As of 2015, the figure for Indonesia was 17%.

==== Women in life sciences ====
In life sciences, women researchers have achieved parity (45–55% of researchers) in many countries. In some, the balance even now tips in their favour. Six out of ten researchers are women in both medical and agricultural sciences in Belarus and New Zealand, for instance. More than two-thirds of researchers in medical sciences are women in El Salvador, Estonia, Kazakhstan, Latvia, the Philippines, Tajikistan, Ukraine and Venezuela.

There has been a steady increase in female graduates in agricultural sciences since the turn of the century. In sub-Saharan Africa, for instance, numbers of female graduates in agricultural science have been increasing steadily, with eight countries reporting a share of women graduates of 40% or more: Lesotho, Madagascar, Mozambique, Namibia, Sierra Leone, South Africa, Swaziland and Zimbabwe. The reasons for this surge are unclear, although one explanation may lie in the growing emphasis on national food security and the food industry. Another possible explanation is that women are highly represented in biotechnology. For example, in South Africa, women were underrepresented in engineering (16%) in 2004 and in 'natural scientific professions' (16%) in 2006 but made up 52% of employees working in biotechnology-related companies.

Women play an increasing role in environmental sciences and conservation biology. In fact, women played a foremost role in the development of these disciplines. Silent Spring by Rachel Carson proved an important impetus to the conservation movement and the later banning of chemical pesticides. Women played an important role in conservation biology including the famous work of Dian Fossey, who published the famous Gorillas in the Mist and Jane Goodall who studied primates in East Africa. Today women make up an increasing proportion of roles in the active conservation sector. A recent survey of those working in the Wildlife Trusts in the U.K., the leading conservation organisation in England, found that there are nearly as many women as men in practical conservation roles.

==== In engineering and related fields ====
Women are consistently underrepresented in engineering and related fields. In Israel, for instance, where 28% of senior academic staff are women, there are proportionately many fewer in engineering (14%), physical sciences (11%), mathematics and computer sciences (10%) but dominate education (52%) and paramedical occupations (63%). In Japan and the Republic of Korea, women represent just 5% and 10% of engineers.

For women who are pursuing STEM major careers, these individuals often face gender disparities in the work field, especially in regards to science and engineering. It has become more common for women to pursue undergraduate degrees in science, but are continuously discredited in salary rates and higher ranking positions. For example, men show a greater likelihood of being selected for an employment position than a woman.

In Europe and North America, the number of female graduates in engineering, physics, mathematics and computer science is generally low. Women make up just 19% of engineers in Canada, Germany and the US and 22% in Finland, for example. However, 50% of engineering graduates are women in Cyprus, 38% in Denmark and 36% in the Russian Federation, for instance.

In many cases, engineering has lost ground to other sciences, including agriculture. The case of New Zealand is fairly typical. Here, women jumped from representing 39% to 70% of agricultural graduates between 2000 and 2012, continued to dominate health (80–78%) but ceded ground in science (43–39%) and engineering (33–27%).

In a number of developing countries, there is a sizable proportion of women engineers. At least three out of ten engineers are women, for instance, in Costa Rica, Vietnam and the United Arab Emirates (31%), Algeria (32%), Mozambique (34%), Tunisia (41%) and Brunei Darussalam (42%). In Malaysia (50%) and Oman (53%), women are on a par with men. Of the 13 sub-Saharan countries reporting data, seven have observed substantial increases (more than 5%) in women engineers since 2000, namely: Benin, Burundi, Eritrea, Ethiopia, Madagascar, Mozambique and Namibia.

Of the seven Arab countries reporting data, four observe a steady percentage or an increase in female engineers (Morocco, Oman, Palestine and Saudi Arabia). In the United Arab Emirates, the government has made it a priority to develop a knowledge economy, having recognized the need for a strong human resource base in science, technology and engineering. With just 1% of the labour force being Emirati, it is also concerned about the low percentage of Emirati citizens employed in key industries. As a result, it has introduced policies promoting the training and employment of Emirati citizens, as well as a greater participation of Emirati women in the labour force. Emirati female engineering students have said that they are attracted to a career in engineering for reasons of financial independence, the high social status associated with this field, the opportunity to engage in creative and challenging projects and the wide range of career opportunities.

An analysis of computer science shows a steady decrease in female graduates since 2000 that is particularly marked in high-income countries. Between 2000 and 2012, the share of women graduates in computer science slipped in Australia, New Zealand, the Republic of Korea and US. In Latin America and the Caribbean, the share of women graduates in computer science dropped by between 2 and 13 percentage points over this period for all countries reporting data.

There are exceptions. In Denmark, the proportion of female graduates in computer science increased from 15% to 24% between 2000 and 2012 and Germany saw an increase from 10% to 17%. These are still very low levels. Figures are higher in many emerging economies. In Turkey, for instance, the proportion of women graduating in computer science rose from a relatively high 29% to 33% between 2000 and 2012.

The Malaysian information technology (IT) sector is made up equally of women and men, with large numbers of women employed as university professors and in the private sector. This is a product of two historical trends: the predominance of women in the Malay electronics industry, the precursor to the IT industry, and the national push to achieve a 'pan-Malayan' culture beyond the three ethnic groups of Indian, Chinese and Malay. Government support for the education of all three groups is available on a quota basis and, since few Malay men are interested in IT, this leaves more room for women. Additionally, families tend to be supportive of their daughters' entry into this prestigious and highly remunerated industry, in the interests of upward social mobility. Malaysia's push to develop an endogenous research culture should deepen this trend.

In India, the substantial increase in women undergraduates in engineering may be indicative of a change in the 'masculine' perception of engineering in the country. It is also a product of interest on the part of parents, since their daughters will be assured of employment as the field expands, as well as an advantageous marriage. Other factors include the 'friendly' image of engineering in India and the easy access to engineering education resulting from the increase in the number of women's engineering colleges over the last two decades.

==== In space ====
While women have made huge strides in the STEM fields, it is obvious that they are still underrepresented. One of the areas where women are most underrepresented in science is space flight. Out of the 556 people who have traveled to space, only 65 of them were women. This means that only 11% of astronauts have been women.

In the 1960s, the American space program was taking off. However, women were not allowed to be considered for the space program because at the time astronauts were required to be military pilots – a profession that women were not allowed to be a part of. There were other "practical" reasons as well. According to General Don Flickinger of the United States Air Force, there was difficulty "designing and fitting a space suit to accommodate their particular biological needs and functions."

During the early 1960s, the first American astronauts, nicknamed the Mercury Seven, were training. At the same time, William Randolph Lovelace II was interested to see if women could manage to go through the same training that the Mercury 7 undergoing at the time. Lovelace recruited thirteen female pilots, called the "Mercury 13", and put them through the same tests that the male astronauts took. As a result, the women actually performed better on these tests than the men of the Mercury 7 did. However, this did not convince NASA officials to allow women in space. In response, congressional hearings were held to investigate discrimination against women in the program. One of the women who testified at the hearing was Jerrie Cobb, the first woman to pass Lovelace's tests. During her testimony, Cobb said:

I find it a little ridiculous when I read in a newspaper that there is a place called Chimp College in New Mexico where they are training chimpanzees for space flight, one a female named Glenda. I think it would be at least as important to let the women undergo this training for space flight.

NASA officials also had representatives present, notably astronauts John Glenn and Scott Carpenter, to testify that women are not suited for the space program. Ultimately, no action came from the hearings, and NASA did not put a woman in space until 1983.

Even though the United States did not allow women in space during the 60s or 70s, other countries did. Valentina Tereshkova, a cosmonaut from the Soviet Union, was the first woman to fly in space. Although she had no piloting experience, she flew on the Vostok 6 in 1963. Before going to space, Tereshkova was a textile worker. Although she successfully orbited the Earth 48 times, the next woman to go to space did not fly until almost twenty years later.

Sally Ride was the third woman to go to space and the first American woman in space. In 1978, Ride and five other women were accepted into the first class of astronauts that allowed women. In 1983, Ride became the first American woman in space when she flew on the Challenger for the STS-7 mission.

NASA has been more inclusive in recent years. The number of women in NASA's astronaut classes has steadily risen since the first class that allowed women in 1978. The most recent class was 45% women, and the class before was 50%. In 2019, the first all-female spacewalk was completed at the International Space Station.

Share of female researchers by country, 2013 or closest year. Source: UNESCO Science Report: towards 2030, data from UNESCO Institute for Statistics.

=== Regional trends as of 2013 ===
The global figures mask wide disparities from one region to another. In Southeast Europe, for instance, women researchers have obtained parity and, at 44%, are on the verge of doing so in Central Asia and Latin America and the Caribbean. In the European Union, on the other hand, just one in three (33%) researchers is a woman, compared to 37% in the Arab world. Women are also better represented in sub-Saharan Africa (30%) than in South Asia (17%).

There are also wide intraregional disparities. Women make up 52% of researchers in the Philippines and Thailand, for instance, and are close to parity in Malaysia and Vietnam, yet only one in three researchers is a woman in Indonesia and Singapore. In Japan and the Republic of Korea, two countries characterized by high researcher densities and technological sophistication, as few as 15% and 18% of researchers respectively are women. These are the lowest ratios among members of the Organisation for Economic Co-operation and Development. The Republic of Korea also has the widest gap among OECD members in remuneration between men and women researchers (39%). There is also a yawning gap in Japan (29%).

==== Latin America and the Caribbean ====
Latin America has some of the world's highest rates of women studying scientific fields; it also shares with the Caribbean one of the highest proportions of female researchers: 44%. Of the 12 countries reporting data for the years 2010–2013, seven have achieved gender parity, or even dominate research: Bolivia (63%), Venezuela (56%), Argentina (53%), Paraguay (52%), Uruguay (49%), Brazil (48%) and Guatemala (45%). Costa Rica is on the cusp (43%). Chile has the lowest score among countries for which there are recent data (31%). The Caribbean paints a similar picture, with Cuba having achieved gender parity (47%) and Trinidad and Tobago on 44%. Recent data on women's participation in industrial research are available for those countries with the most developed national innovation systems, with the exception of Brazil and Cuba: Uruguay (47%), Argentina (29%), Colombia and Chile (26%).

As in most other regions, the great majority of health graduates are women (60–85%). Women are also strongly represented in science. More than 40% of science graduates are women in each of Argentina, Colombia, Ecuador, El Salvador, Mexico, Panama and Uruguay. The Caribbean paints a similar picture, with women graduates in science being on a par with men or dominating this field in Barbados, Cuba, Dominican Republic and Trinidad and Tobago.

In engineering, women make up over 30% of the graduate population in seven Latin American countries (Argentina, Colombia, Costa Rica, Honduras, Panama and Uruguay) and one Caribbean country, the Dominican Republic. There has been a decrease in the number of women engineering graduates in Argentina, Chile and Honduras.

The participation of women in science has consistently dropped since the turn of the century. This trend has been observed in all sectors of the larger economies: Argentina, Brazil, Chile and Colombia. Mexico is a notable exception, having recorded a slight increase. Some of the decrease may be attributed to women transferring to agricultural sciences in these countries. Another negative trend is the drop in female doctoral students and in the labour force. Of those countries reporting data, the majority signal a significant drop of 10–20 percentage points in the transition from master's to doctoral graduates.

A study at UNICAMP (2019–2023) reveals female underrepresentation in publications, particularly in STEM fields and first/last authorship positions. While UNICAMP's 42% female participation is comparable to USP's historical average (38.28%), both fall below the Brazilian average (49%), contrasting with higher female representation in science in some Latin American countries (UNESCO). Despite gender equity policies, female participation at UNICAMP declined after 2021, potentially due to the pandemic, and Field-Weighted Citation Impact (FWCI) was lower in areas like Social Sciences and Life Sciences, highlighting the need for stronger gender equality policies in science.

==== Eastern Europe, West and Central Asia ====
Most countries in Eastern Europe, West and Central Asia have attained gender parity in research (Armenia, Azerbaijan, Georgia, Kazakhstan, Mongolia and Ukraine) or are on the brink of doing so (Kyrgyzstan and Uzbekistan). This trend is reflected in tertiary education, with some exceptions in engineering and computer science. Although Belarus and the Russian Federation have seen a drop over the past decade, women still represented 41% of researchers in 2013. In the former Soviet states, women are also very present in the business enterprise sector: Bosnia and Herzegovina (59%), Azerbaijan (57%), Kazakhstan (50%), Mongolia (48%), Latvia (48%), Serbia (46%), Croatia and Bulgaria (43%), Ukraine and Uzbekistan (40%), Romania and Montenegro (38%), Belarus (37%), Russian Federation (37%).

One in three researchers is a woman in Turkey (36%) and Tajikistan (34%). Participation rates are lower in Iran (26%) and Israel (21%), although Israeli women represent 28% of senior academic staff. At university, Israeli women dominate medical sciences (63%) but only a minority study engineering (14%), physical sciences (11%), mathematics and computer science (10%). There has been an interesting evolution in Iran. Whereas the share of female PhD graduates in health remained stable at 38–39% between 2007 and 2012, it rose in all three other broad fields. Most spectacular was the leap in female PhD graduates in agricultural sciences from 4% to 33% but there was also a marked progression in science (from 28% to 39%) and engineering (from 8% to 16%).

==== Southeast Europe ====
With the exception of Greece, all the countries of Southeast Europe were once part of the Soviet bloc. Some 49% of researchers in these countries are women (compared to 37% in Greece in 2011). This high proportion is considered a legacy of the consistent investment in education by the Socialist governments in place until the early 1990s, including that of the former Yugoslavia. Moreover, the participation of female researchers is holding steady or increasing in much of the region, with representation broadly even across the four sectors of government, business, higher education and non-profit. In most countries, women tend to be on a par with men among tertiary graduates in science. Between 70% and 85% of graduates are women in health, less than 40% in agriculture and between 20% and 30% in engineering. Albania has seen a considerable increase in the share of its women graduates in engineering and agriculture.

==== European Union ====
Women make up 33% of researchers overall in the European Union (EU), slightly more than their representation in science (32%). Women constitute 40% of researchers in higher education, 40% in government and 19% in the private sector, with the number of female researchers increasing faster than that of male researchers. The proportion of female researchers has been increasing over the last decade, at a faster rate than men (5.1% annually over 2002–2009 compared with 3.3% for men), which is also true for their participation among scientists and engineers (up 5.4% annually between 2002 and 2010, compared with 3.1% for men).

Despite these gains, women's academic careers in Europe remain characterized by strong vertical and horizontal segregation. In 2010, although female students (55%) and graduates (59%) outnumbered male students, men outnumbered women at the PhD and graduate levels (albeit by a small margin). Further along in the research career, women represented 44% of grade C academic staff, 37% of grade B academic staff and 20% of grade A academic staff.11 These trends are intensified in science, with women making up 31% of the student population at the tertiary level to 38% of PhD students and 35% of PhD graduates. At the faculty level, they make up 32% of academic grade C personnel, 23% of grade B and 11% of grade A. The proportion of women among full professors is lowest in engineering and technology, at 7.9%. With respect to representation in science decision-making, in 2010 15.5% of higher education institutions were headed by women and 10% of universities had a female rector.

Membership on science boards remained predominantly male as well, with women making up 36% of board members. The EU has engaged in a major effort to integrate female researchers and gender research into its research and innovation strategy since the mid-2000s. Increases in women's representation in all of the scientific fields overall indicates that this effort has met with some success; however, the continued lack of representation of women at the top level of faculties, management and science decision making indicate that more work needs to be done. The EU is addressing this through a gender equality strategy and crosscutting mandate in Horizon 2020, its research and innovation funding programme for 2014–2020.

==== Australia, New Zealand and USA ====
In 2013, women made up the majority of PhD graduates in fields related to health in Australia (63%), New Zealand (58%) and the United States of America (73%). The same can be said of agriculture, in New Zealand's case (73%). Women have also achieved parity in agriculture in Australia (50%) and the United States (44%). Just one in five women graduate in engineering in the latter two countries, a situation that has not changed over the past decade. In New Zealand, women jumped from constituting 39% to 70% of agricultural graduates (all levels) between 2000 and 2012 but ceded ground in science (43–39%), engineering (33–27%) and health (80–78%). As for Canada, it has not reported sex-disaggregated data for women graduates in science and engineering in recent years. Moreover, none of the four countries mentioned here have reported recent data on the share of female researchers.

==== South Asia ====
South Asia is the region where women make up the smallest proportion of researchers: 17%. This is 13 percentage points below sub-Saharan Africa. Of those countries in South Asia reporting data for 2009–2013, Nepal has the lowest representation of all (in head counts), at 8% (2010), a substantial drop from 15% in 2002. In 2013, only 14% of researchers (in full-time equivalents) were women in the region's most populous country, India, down slightly from 15% in 2009. The percentage of female researchers is highest in Sri Lanka (39%), followed by Pakistan: 24% in 2009, 31% in 2013. There are no recent data available for Afghanistan or Bangladesh.

Share of women among researchers employed in the business enterprise sector, 2013 or closest year. Source: UNESCO Science Report: towards 2030, Figure 3.4, data from UNESCO Institute for Statistics.

Women are most present in the private non-profit sector – they make up 60% of employees in Sri Lanka – followed by the academic sector: 30% of Pakistani and 42% of Sri Lankan female researchers. Women tend to be less present in the government sector and least likely to be employed in the business sector, accounting for 23% of employees in Sri Lanka, 11% in India and just 5% in Nepal. Women have achieved parity in science in both Sri Lanka and Bangladesh but are less likely to undertake research in engineering. They represent 17% of the research pool in Bangladesh and 29% in Sri Lanka. Many Sri Lankan women have followed the global trend of opting for a career in agricultural sciences (54%) and they have also achieved parity in health and welfare. In Bangladesh, just over 30% choose agricultural sciences and health, which goes against the global trend. Although Bangladesh still has progress to make, the share of women in each scientific field has increased steadily over the past decade.

==== Southeast Asia ====
Southeast Asia presents a different picture entirely, with women basically on a par with men in some countries: they make up 52% of researchers in the Philippines and Thailand, for example. Other countries are close to parity, such as Malaysia and Vietnam, whereas Indonesia and Singapore are still around the 30% mark. Cambodia trails its neighbours at 20%. Female researchers in the region are spread fairly equally across the sectors of participation, with the exception of the private sector, where they make up 30% or less of researchers in most countries.

The proportion of women tertiary graduates reflects these trends, with high percentages of women in science in Brunei Darussalam, Malaysia, Myanmar and the Philippines (around 60%) and a low of 10% in Cambodia. Women make up the majority of graduates in health sciences, from 60% in Laos to 81% in Myanmar – Vietnam being an exception at 42%. Women graduates are on a par with men in agriculture but less present in engineering: Vietnam (31%), the Philippines (30%) and Malaysia (39%); here, the exception is Myanmar, at 65%. In the Republic of Korea, women make up about 40% of graduates in science and agriculture and 71% of graduates in health sciences but only 18% of female researchers overall. This represents a loss in the investment made in educating girls and women up through tertiary education, a result of traditional views of women's role in society and in the home. Kim and Moon (2011) remark on the tendency of Korean women to withdraw from the labour force to take care of children and assume family responsibilities, calling it a 'domestic brain drain'.

Women remain very much a minority in Japanese science (15% in 2013), although the situation has improved slightly (13% in 2008) since the government fixed a target in 2006 of raising the ratio of female researchers to 25%. Calculated on the basis of the current number of doctoral students, the government hopes to obtain a 20% share of women in science, 15% in engineering and 30% in agriculture and health by the end of the current Basic Plan for Science and Technology in 2016. In 2013, Japanese female researchers were most common in the public sector in health and agriculture, where they represented 29% of academics and 20% of government researchers. In the business sector, just 8% of researchers were women (in head counts), compared to 25% in the academic sector. In other public research institutions, women accounted for 16% of researchers. One of the main thrusts of Abenomics, Japan's current growth strategy, is to enhance the socio-economic role of women. Consequently, the selection criteria for most large university grants now take into account the proportion of women among teaching staff and researchers.

The low ratio of women researchers in Japan and the Republic of Korea, which both have some of the highest researcher densities in the world, brings down Southeast Asia's average to 22.5% for the share of women among researchers in the region.

==== Arab States ====
At 37%, the share of female researchers in the Arab States compares well with other regions. The countries with the highest proportion of female researchers are Bahrain and Sudan at around 40%. Jordan, Libya, Oman, Palestine and Qatar have percentage shares in the low twenties. The country with the lowest participation of female researchers is Saudi Arabia, even though they make up the majority of tertiary graduates, but the figure of 1.4% covers only the King Abdulaziz City for Science and Technology. Female researchers in the region are primarily employed in government research institutes, with some countries also seeing a high participation of women in private nonprofit organizations and universities. With the exception of Sudan (40%) and Palestine (35%), fewer than one in four researchers in the business enterprise sector is a woman; for half of the countries reporting data, there are barely any women at all employed in this sector.

Despite these variable numbers, the percentage of female tertiary-level graduates in science and engineering is very high across the region, which indicates there is a substantial drop between graduation and employment and research. Women make up half or more than half of science graduates in all but Sudan and over 45% in agriculture in eight out of the 15 countries reporting data, namely Algeria, Egypt, Jordan, Lebanon, Sudan, Syria, Tunisia and the United Arab Emirates. In engineering, women make up over 70% of graduates in Oman, with rates of 25–38% in the majority of the other countries, which is high in comparison to other regions.

The participation of women is somewhat lower in health than in other regions, possibly on account of cultural norms restricting interactions between males and females. Iraq and Oman have the lowest percentages (mid-30s), whereas Iran, Jordan, Kuwait, Palestine and Saudi Arabia are at gender parity in this field. The United Arab Emirates and Bahrain have the highest rates of all: 83% and 84%.

Once Arab women scientists and engineers graduate, they may come up against barriers to finding gainful employment. These include a misalignment between university programmes and labour market demand – a phenomenon which also affects men –, a lack of awareness about what a career in their chosen field entails, family bias against working in mixed-gender environments and a lack of female role models.

One of the countries with the smallest female labour force is developing technical and vocational education for girls as part of a wider scheme to reduce dependence on foreign labour. By 2017, the Technical and Vocational Training Corporation of Saudi Arabia is to have constructed 50 technical colleges, 50 girls' higher technical institutes and 180 industrial secondary institutes. The plan is to create training placements for about 500 000 students, half of them girls. Boys and girls will be trained in vocational professions that include information technology, medical equipment handling, plumbing, electricity and mechanics.

==== Sub-Saharan Africa ====
Just under one in three (30%) researchers in sub-Saharan Africa is a woman. Much of sub-Saharan Africa is seeing solid gains in the share of women among tertiary graduates in scientific fields. In two of the top four countries for women's representation in science, women graduates are part of very small cohorts, however: they make up 54% of Lesotho's 47 tertiary graduates in science and 60% of those in Namibia's graduating class of 149. South Africa and Zimbabwe, which have larger graduate populations in science, have achieved parity, with 49% and 47% respectively. The next grouping clusters seven countries poised at around 35–40% (Angola, Burundi, Eritrea, Liberia, Madagascar, Mozambique and Rwanda). The rest are grouped around 30% or below (Benin, Ethiopia, Ghana, Swaziland and Uganda). Burkina Faso ranks lowest, with women making up 18% of its science graduates.

Female representation in engineering is fairly high in sub-Saharan Africa in comparison with other regions. In Mozambique and South Africa, for instance, women make up more than 34% and 28% of engineering graduates, respectively. Numbers of female graduates in agricultural science have been increasing steadily across the continent, with eight countries reporting the share of women graduates of 40% or more (Lesotho, Madagascar, Mozambique, Namibia, Sierra Leone, South Africa, Swaziland and Zimbabwe). In health, this rate ranges from 26% and 27% in Benin and Eritrea to 94% in Namibia.

Of note is that women account for a relatively high proportion of researchers employed in the business enterprise sector in South Africa (35%), Kenya (34%), Botswana and Namibia (33%) and Zambia (31%). Female participation in industrial research is lower in Uganda (21%), Ethiopia (15%) and Mali (12%).

== Lack of agency and representation ==
=== Social pressures to both conform to femininity and which punish femininity ===
Beginning in the twentieth century to present day, more and more women are becoming acknowledged for their work in science. However, women often find themselves at odds with expectations held towards them in relation to their scientific studies. For example, in 1968 James Watson questioned scientist Rosalind Franklin's place in the industry. He claimed that "the best place for a feminist was in another person's lab". Women were and still are often critiqued of their overall presentation. In Franklin's situation, she was seen as lacking femininity for she failed to wear lipstick or revealing clothing.

Since on average most of a woman's colleagues in science are men who do not see her as a true social peer, she will also find herself left out of opportunities to discuss possible research opportunities outside of the laboratory. In Londa Schiebinger's book, Has Feminism Changed Science?, she mentions that men would have discussed their research outside of the lab, but this conversation is preceded by culturally "masculine" small-talk topics that, whether intentionally or not, excluded women influenced by their culture's feminine gender role from the conversation. Consequently, this act of excluding many women from the after-hours work discussions produced a more separate work environment between the men and the women in science; as women then would converse with other women in science about their current findings and theories. Ultimately, the women's work was devalued as a male scientist was not involved in the overall research and analysis.

According to Oxford University Press, the inequality toward women is "endorsed within cultures and entrenched within institutions [that] hold power to reproduce that inequality". There are various gendered barriers in social networks that prevent women from working in male-dominated fields and top management jobs. Social networks are based on the cultural beliefs such as schemas and stereotypes. According to social psychology studies, top management jobs are more likely to have incumbent schemas that favor "an achievement-oriented aggressiveness and emotional toughness that is distinctly male in character". Gender stereotypes of feminine style assume women to be conforming and submissive to male culture creating a sense of unqualified women for top management jobs. In attempting to demonstrate competence and power, women can still be seen as unlikeable and untrustworthy, even if they excel at traditionally "masculine" tasks. In addition, women's achievements are likely to be dismissed or discredited. These "untrustworthy, dislikable women" could have very well been denied achievement from the fear men held of a woman overtaking his management position. Social networks and gender stereotypes produce many injustices that women have to experience in their workplace, as well as, the various obstacles they encounter when trying to advance in male-dominated and top management jobs. Women in professions like science, technology, and other related industries are likely to encounter these gendered barriers in their careers.

=== Underrepresentation of homosexual and bi women, and gender nonconformists in STEM ===
While there has been a push to encourage more women to participate in science, there is less outreach to lesbian, bi, or gender nonconforming women, and gender nonconforming people more broadly. Due to the lack of data and statistics of LGBTQ members involvement in the STEM field, it is unknown to what exact degree lesbian and bisexual women, gender non-conformers (transgender, nonbinary/agender, or anti-gender gender abolitionists who eschew the system altogether) are potentially even more repressed and underrepresented than their straight peers. But a general lack of out lesbian and bi women in STEM has been noted. Reasons for under-representation of same-sex attracted women and anyone gender nonconforming in STEM fields include lack of role models in K–12, the desire of some transgender girls and women to adopt traditional heteronormative gender roles as gender is a cultural performance and socially-determined subjective internal experience, employment discrimination, and the possibility of sexual harassment in the workplace. Historically, women who have accepted STEM research positions for the government or the military remained in the closet due to lack of federal protections or the fact that homosexual or gender nonconforming expression was criminalized in their country. A notable example is Sally Ride, a physicist, the first American female astronaut, and a lesbian. Sally Ride chose not to reveal her sexuality until after her death in 2012; she purposefully revealed her sexual orientation in her obituary. She has been known as the first female (and youngest) American to enter space, as well as, starting her own company, Sally Ride Science, that encourages young girls to enter the STEM field. She chose to keep her sexuality to herself because she was familiar with "the male-dominated" NASA's anti-homosexual policies at the time of her space travel. Sally Ride's legacy continues as her company is still working to increase young girls and women's participation in the STEM fields.

In a nationwide study of LGBTQA employees in STEM fields in the United States, same-sex attracted and gender nonconforming women in engineering, earth sciences, and mathematics reported that they were less likely to be out in the workplace. In general, LGBTQA people in this survey reported that, when more female or feminine gender role-identified people worked in their labs, the more accepting and safe the work environment. In another study of over 30,000 LGBT employees in STEM-related federal agencies in the United States, queer women in these agencies reported feeling isolated in the workplace and having to work harder than their gender conforming male colleagues. This isolation and overachievement remained constant as they earned supervisory positions and worked their way up the ladder. Gender nonconforming people in physics, particularly those identified as trans women in physics programs and labs, felt the most isolated and perceived the most hostility.

Organizations such as Lesbians Who Tech, Out to Innovate, Out in Science, Technology, Engineering and Mathematics (OSTEM), Pride in STEM, and House of STEM provide networking and mentoring opportunities for lesbian girls and women and LGBT people interested in or currently working in STEM fields. These organizations also advocate for the rights of lesbian and bi women and gender nonconformists in STEM in education and the workplace.

== Reasons for disadvantages ==
Margaret Rossiter, an American historian of science, offered three concepts to explain the reasons behind the data in statistics and how these reasons disadvantaged women in the science industry. The first concept is hierarchical segregation. This is a well-known phenomenon in society, that the higher the level and rank of power and prestige, the smaller the population of females participating. The hierarchical differences point out that there are fewer women participating at higher levels of both academia and industry. Based on data collected in 1982, women earn 54 percent of all bachelor's degrees in the United States, with 50 percent of these in science. The source also indicated that this number increased almost every year. As of 2020, women were earning 57.3 percent of all bachelor's degrees, with 38.6 percent of these in a STEM field.

The second concept included in Rossiter's explanation of women in science is territorial segregation. The term refers to how female employment is often clustered in specific industries or categories in industries. Women stayed at home or took employment in feminine fields while men left the home to work. Although nearly half of the civilian work force is female, women still comprise the majority of low-paid jobs or jobs that society considered feminine. Statistics show that 60 percent of white professional women are nurses, daycare workers, or schoolteachers.

Researchers collected the data on many differences between women and men in science. Rossiter found that in 1966, thirty-eight percent of female scientists held master's degrees compared to twenty-six percent of male scientists; but large proportions of female scientists were in environmental and nonprofit organizations. During the late 1960s and 1970s, equal-rights legislation made the number of female scientists rise dramatically. The number of science degrees awarded to woman rose from seven percent in 1970 to twenty-four percent in 1985. In 1975 only 385 women received bachelor's degrees in engineering compared to 11,000 women in 1985. Elizabeth Finkel claims that even if the number of women participating in scientific fields increases, the opportunities are still limited. Another researcher, Harriet Zuckerman, claims that when woman and man have similar abilities for a job, the probability of the woman getting the job is lower. Finkel agrees, saying, "In general, while woman and men seem to be completing doctorate with similar credentials and experience, the opposition and rewards they find are not comparable. Women tend to be treated with less salary and status, many policy makers notice this phenomenon and try to rectify the unfair situation for women participating in scientific fields."

=== Societal disadvantages ===
Despite women's tendency to perform better than men academically, there are flaws involving stereotyping, lack of information, and family influence that have been found to affect women's involvement in science. Stereotyping has an effect, because people associate characteristics such as nurturing, kind, and warm or characteristics like strong and powerful with a particular gender. These character associations lead people to stereotype that certain jobs are more suitable to a particular gender. Lack of information is something that many institutions have worked hard over the years to improve by making programs such as the IFAC project (Information for a choice: empowering women through learning for scientific and technological career paths) which investigated low women participation in science and technology fields at high school to university level. However, not all efforts were as successful, "Science: it's a girl thing" campaign, which has since been removed, received backlash for further encouraging women that they must partake in "girly" or "feminine" activities. The idea being that if women are fully informed of their career choices and employability, they will be more inclined to pursue STEM field jobs. Women also struggle in the sense of lacking role models of women in science. Family influence is dependent on education level, economic status, and belief system. Education level of a student's parent matters, because oftentimes people who have higher education have a different opinion on education's importance than someone that does not. A parent can also be an influence in the sense that they want their children to follow in their footsteps and pursue a similar occupation, especially in women, it's been found that the mother's line of work tends to correlate with their daughters. Economic status can influence what kind of higher education a student might get. Economic status may influence their education depending on whether they are a work bound student or a college bound student. A work bound student may choose a shorter career path to quickly begin making money or due to lack of time. The belief system of a household can also have a big impact on women depending on their family's religious or cultural viewpoints. There are still some countries that have certain regulations on women's occupation, clothing, and curfew that limit career choices for women. Parental influence is also relevant because people tend to want to fulfill what they could not have as a child. Unfortunately, women are at such a disadvantage because not only must they overcome societal norms but then they also have to outperform men for the same recognition, studies show.

That sexism is alive and well in science is known. ...
Even in the life sciences, where men and women start careers in fairly equal numbers, the number of women drops off rapidly at professorial level.
On average, fewer than one in five science professors are female. Science punishes career breaks, and women who take time off to have children are immediately disadvantaged. "The flashpoint is when you're about 35 and trying to get tenure. That can be when you're trying to have kids, and it can play a major role in why you see so much attrition at that stage," said Jennifer Rohn, a cell biologist at University College London. A grant may give a woman a year's grace if she has a baby, but it takes longer to get back into research projects than that.

== Contemporary advocacy and developments ==
=== Efforts to increase participation ===
A number of organizations have been set up to combat the stereotyping that may encourage girls away from careers in these areas. In the UK The WISE Campaign (Women into Science, Engineering and Construction) and the UKRC (The UK Resource Centre for Women in SET) are collaborating to ensure industry, academia and education are all aware of the importance of challenging the traditional approaches to careers advice and recruitment that mean some of the best brains in the country are lost to science. The UKRC and other women's networks provide female role models, resources and support for activities that promote science to girls and women. The Women's Engineering Society, a professional association in the UK, has been supporting women in engineering and science since 1919. In computing, the British Computer Society group BCSWomen is active in encouraging girls to consider computing careers, and in supporting women in the computing workforce.

In the United States, the Association for Women in Science is one of the most prominent organization for professional women in science. In 2011, the Scientista Foundation was created to empower pre-professional college and graduate women in science, technology, engineering and mathematics (STEM), to stay in the career track. There are also several organizations focused on increasing mentorship from a younger age. One of the best known groups is Science Club for Girls, which pairs undergraduate mentors with high school and middle school mentees. The model of that pairs undergraduate college mentors with younger students is quite popular. In addition, many young women are creating programs to boost participation in STEM at a younger level, either through conferences or competitions.

In efforts to make women scientists more visible to the general public, the Grolier Club in New York hosted a "landmark exhibition" titled "Extraordinary Women in Science & Medicine: Four Centuries of Achievement", showcasing the lives and works of 32 women scientists in 2003. The National Institute for Occupational Safety and Health (NIOSH) developed a video series highlighting the stories of female researchers at NIOSH. Each of the women featured in the videos share their journey into science, technology, engineering, or math (STEM), and offers encouragement to aspiring scientists. NIOSH also partners with external organizations in efforts to introduce individuals to scientific disciplines and funds several science-based training programs across the country.

Creative Resilience: Art by Women in Science is a multi–media exhibition and accompanying publication, produced in 2021 by the Gender Section of the United Nations Educational, Scientific and Cultural Organization (UNESCO). The project aims to give visibility to women, both professionals and university students, working in science, technology, engineering and mathematics (STEM). With short biographical information and graphic reproductions of their artworks dealing with the COVID-19 pandemic and accessible online, the project provides a platform for women scientists to express their experiences, insights, and creative responses to the pandemic.

==== In the media ====
In 2013, journalist Christie Aschwanden noted that a type of media coverage of women scientists that "treats its subject's sex as her most defining detail" was still prevalent. She proposed a checklist, the "Finkbeiner test", to help avoid this approach. It was cited in the coverage of a much-criticized 2013 New York Times obituary of rocket scientist Yvonne Brill that began with the words: "She made a mean beef stroganoff". Women are often poorly portrayed in film. The misrepresentation of women scientists in film, television and books can influence children to engage in gender stereotyping. This was seen in a 2007 meta-analysis conducted by Jocelyn Steinke and colleagues from Western Michigan University where, after engaging elementary school students in a Draw-a-Scientist Test, out of 4,000 participants only 28 girls drew female scientists.

=== Notable controversies and developments ===
A study conducted at Lund University in 2010 and 2011 analysed the genders of invited contributors to News & Views in Nature and Perspectives in Science. It found that 3.8% of the Earth and environmental science contributions to News & Views were written by women even while the field was estimated to be 16–20% female in the United States. Nature responded by suggesting that, worldwide, a significantly lower number of Earth scientists were women, but nevertheless committed to address any disparity.

In 2012, a journal article published in Proceedings of the National Academy of Sciences (PNAS) reported a gender bias among science faculty. Faculty were asked to review a resume from a hypothetical student and report how likely they would be to hire or mentor that student, as well as what they would offer as starting salary. Two resumes were distributed randomly to the faculty, only differing in the names at the top of the resume (John or Jennifer). The male student was rated as significantly more competent, more likely to be hired, and more likely to be mentored. The median starting salary offered to the male student was greater than $3,000 over the starting salary offered to the female student. Both male and female faculty exhibited this gender bias. This study suggests bias may partly explain the persistent deficit in the number of women at the highest levels of scientific fields. Another study reported that men are favored in some domains, such as biology tenure rates, but that the majority of domains were gender-fair; the authors interpreted this to suggest that the under-representation of women in the professorial ranks was not solely caused by sexist hiring, promotion, and remuneration. In April 2015 Williams and Ceci published a set of five national experiments showing that hypothetical female applicants were favored by faculty for assistant professorships over identically qualified men by a ratio of 2 to 1.

In 2014, a controversy over the depiction of pinup women on Rosetta project scientist Matt Taylor's shirt during a press conference raised questions of sexism within the European Space Agency. The shirt, which featured cartoon women with firearms, led to an outpouring of criticism and an apology after which Taylor "broke down in tears."

In 2015, stereotypes about women in science were directed at Fiona Ingleby, research fellow in evolution, behavior, and environment at the University of Sussex, and Megan Head, postdoctoral researcher at the Australian National University, when they submitted a paper analyzing the progression of PhD graduates to postdoctoral positions in the life sciences to the journal PLOS ONE. The authors received an email on 27 March informing them that their paper had been rejected due to its poor quality. The email included comments from an anonymous reviewer, which included the suggestion that male authors be added in order to improve the quality of the science and serve as a means of ensuring that incorrect interpretations of the data are not included. Ingleby posted excerpts from the email on Twitter on 29 April bringing the incident to the attention of the public and media. The editor was dismissed from the journal and the reviewer was removed from the list of potential reviewers. A spokesman from PLOS apologized to the authors and said they would be given the opportunity to have the paper reviewed again.

On 9 June 2015, Nobel prize winning biochemist Tim Hunt spoke at the World Conference of Science Journalists in Seoul. Prior to applauding the work of women scientists, he described emotional tension, saying "you fall in love with them, they fall in love with you, and when you criticise them they cry." Initially, his remarks were widely condemned and he was forced to resign from his position at University College London. However, multiple conference attendees gave accounts, including a partial transcript and a partial recording, maintaining that his comments were understood to be satirical before being taken out of context by the media.

In 2016, an article published in JAMA Dermatology reported a significant and dramatic downward trend in the number of NIH-funded woman investigators in the field of dermatology and that the gender gap between male and female NIH-funded dermatology investigators was widening. The article concluded that this disparity was likely due to a lack of institutional support for women investigators.

==== Problematic public statements ====
In January 2005, Harvard University President Lawrence Summers sparked controversy at a National Bureau of Economic Research (NBER) Conference on Diversifying the Science & Engineering Workforce. Dr. Summers offered his explanation for the shortage of women in senior posts in science and engineering. He made comments suggesting the lower numbers of women in high-level science positions may in part be due to innate differences in abilities or preferences between men and women. Making references to the field and behavioral genetics, he noted the generally greater variability among men (compared to women) on tests of cognitive abilities, leading to proportionally more men than women at both the lower and upper tails of the test score distributions. In his discussion of this, Summers said that "even small differences in the standard deviation [between genders] will translate into very large differences in the available pool substantially out [from the mean]". Summers concluded his discussion by saying:

So my best guess, to provoke you, of what's behind all of this is that the largest phenomenon, by far, is the general clash between people's legitimate family desires and employers' current desire for high power and high intensity, that in the special case of science and engineering, there are issues of intrinsic aptitude, and particularly of the variability of aptitude, and that those considerations are reinforced by what are in fact lesser factors involving socialization and continuing discrimination.

Despite his protégée, Sheryl Sandberg, defending Summers' actions and Summers offering his own apology repeatedly, the Harvard Graduate School of Arts and Sciences passed a motion of "lack of confidence" in the leadership of Summers who had allowed tenure offers to women plummet after taking office in 2001. The year before he became president, Harvard extended 13 of its 36 tenure offers to women and by 2004 those numbers had dropped to 4 of 32 with several departments lacking even a single tenured female professor. This controversy is speculated to have significantly contributed to Summers resignation from his position at Harvard the following year.

== See also ==
- African American women in computer science
- History of science
- History of women in engineering
- History of women in engineering in the United Kingdom
- Index of women scientists articles
- International Day of Women and Girls in Science
- List of inventions and discoveries by women
- List of female scientists before the 20th century
- List of female scientists in the 20th century
- List of female scientists in the 21st century
- List of female mathematicians
- List of female Nobel laureates
- List of women associated with Marie Curie and Irène Joliot-Curie
- Matilda effect
- Organizations for women in science
- Prizes, medals, and awards for women in science
- Margaret W. Rossiter
- Timeline of women in science
- Timeline of women in science in the United States
- Women in archaeology
- Women in computing
- Women in engineering
- Women in geology
- Women in chemistry
- Women in medicine
- Women in physics
- Women in STEM fields
- Women in the workforce
- Women in climate change
- Working Group on Women in Physics

== Sources ==
- This article incorporates text from a free content work. Licensed under CC-BY-SA IGO 3.0. Text taken from UNESCO Science Report: towards 2030, 85–103, UNESCO, UNESCO Publishing.
