= Quintanar =

Quintanar may refer to:

== Surname ==
- Carlos Quintanar (1937–2010), Mexican basketball player
- Luis de Quintanar (1772–1837), Mexican soldier and statesman
- Desideria Quintanar de Yáñez (1814–1893), first woman baptized into the Church of Jesus Christ of Latter-day Saints (LDS Church) in Mexico
- Liliana Quintanar Vera (born 1975), Mexican chemist

== Places in Spain ==
- Quintanar de la Orden, a municipality in Toledo, Castilla–La Mancha
- Quintanar de la Sierra, a municipality and town in Burgos, Castile and León
- Quintanar del Rey, a municipality in Cuenca, Castile-La Mancha

== Sports ==
- CD Quintanar, a football team in Quintanar de la Orden
- CD Quintanar del Rey, a football team
