= Alphonse Rebière =

Advocate for women's rights

Alphonse Michel Rebière (Tulle, 1842 – Paris, 1900) was a nineteenth-century advocate for women's scientific abilities. He wrote the book Les Femmes dans la science, published in 1894. Rebière's piece followed the encyclopedia format, listing the woman alphabetically, giving their names, dates of birth, the social conditions under which they had lived, their contributions and publications. He included "professional and amateur" scientists and those who aided in contributions in "the progress of science." Included in Rebière's book was a section of appended works filled with opinions of famous people on the question "whether or not woman is capable of scientific pursuits." His work was revolutionary in that other works with similar information were never published, and he was one of the first to include women in the field of science.

== Les Femmes dans la science ==
Translated: Women in Science

Rebière's work Les Femmes dans la science was inspired by the women's movement and renewed interest in women's scientific abilities.

== Mathématiques et mathématiciens: Pensées et curiosities ==
According to R. C. Archibald:

... A. M. Rebière published ... a pioneer work entitled: Mathématiques et mathématiciens. Pensées et curiosities. ... The second edition (in later editions there is practically no change) was divided into five parts, headed: Morceaux choisis et pensées (pages 1–178), Variétés et anecdotes (179–340), Paradoxes et singularités (341–470), Problèmes curieux et humoristiques (471–526), Note bibliographique, index and table des matières (527–566).
The textual parts contain, mainly, short quotations or translations (the whole book is in French) from writings ancient and modern. When there is any indication of the source nothing is given, except in rare cases, but the name of the author; the composition of the numerous unsigned para- graphs is attributable to the editor. The work is not, then, strictly a book of quotations but a sort of admixture of quotations, history, mathematical recreations, and table-talk. In defense of his mixture of things gay and serious the author makes appeal to the authority of Pascal: "Les matières de géométrie sont sérieuses d'elles-mêmes, qu'il est avantageux qu'il s'offre quelque occasion pour les rendre un peu divertissaints."

== Publications ==
His publications include:

- Mathématiques et mathématiciens: pensées et curiosités, Libraire Nony & Cie, Paris, 1^{e} édition, 1889; 2^{e} éd., 1893; 4^{e} éd., 1911
- Les Femmes dans la science, Libraire Nony & Co, Paris, 1894
- Jean-François Melon l'économiste, Crauffon, 1896
- Les savants modernes: leur vie et leur travaux, d'après les documents académiques, Libraire Nony & Co, Paris, 1899
