= Siewert =

Siewert is the surname of:

- Alfons Siewert (1872-1922), Ukrainian physician
- Brian Siewert, television composer
- Clara Siewert (1862–1945), German Symbolist painter, graphic artist and sculptor
- Eva Siewert (1907–1994), German writer
- Horst Siewert (1902–1943), German forester and wildlife film-maker
- Jake Siewert (born 1964), former White House press secretary; Goldman Sachs (2012– )
- Rachel Siewert (born 1961), politician
- Robert Siewert (1887–1973), politician and prisoner
- Ruth Siewert (1915–2002), German contralto
- Steven Siewert, photojournalist

== See also ==
- Sievert
