= María Nieves García-Casal =

Spanish scientist/nutritionist (born 1962)

María de las Nieves García-Casal
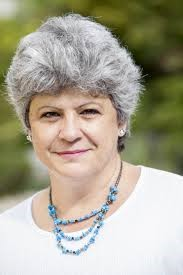
- Born: María de las Nieves García Casal; 1962 (age 63–64); A Coruña, Galicia, Spain
- Occupation: Nutritionist/Scientist

María de las Nieves García-Casal (born 1962) is a licensed dietitian and nutritionist born in Galicia, Spain, raised and educated in Venezuela. She is the first woman to lead the Latin American Society of Nutrition (SLAN), serving as president from 2012 to 2015.

== Education ==
She graduated in nutrition and dietetics from the Central University of Venezuela in 1985, and in 1991 she obtained a doctorate in biochemistry from the Venezuelan Institute of Scientific Research (IVIC). After her doctorate she had a post-doctoral stay at the Hematology Unit of the University of Kansas, United States

== Career ==
She was also president of the Venezuelan Chapter of the Society from 2014 to 2019. Her research includes iron nutrition and the assessment of marine algae as a source of food for humans.

She was the head of the Center of Experimental Medicine at Venezuelan Institute for Scientific Research in Caracas, Venezuela.

García-Casal, throughout her career has received numerous national and international awards for her scientific contributions to health and nutrition. One of the most outstanding was the 2009 award from the Bengoa Foundation (Venezuela) for her research in the field of prevention and treatment of type II diabetes mellitus.

She currently works as a scientist at the World Health Organization in Geneva, Switzerland.
