= Liliana Quintanar Vera =

Mexican chemist

- Education: Stanford University; National Autonomous University of Mexico
- Scientific career
- Workplaces: National Autonomous University of Mexico
- Thesis: Spectroscopic investigation of the multicopper oxidases : correlating structure and reactivity through chemical and mutational perturbations (2004)

Liliana Quintanar Vera (born 1975) is a Mexican chemist. She works on proteins and neurodegenerative diseases.

== Early life and education ==
Quintanar Vera was born in Mexico City in 1975. She took part in the Mexican Academy of Sciences Chemistry Olympics, representing the country in the International Chemistry Olympiad in 1993. She studied chemistry at National Autonomous University of Mexico in 1998. She was awarded the Gabino Barreda medal. She took part in an exchange program with the University of California, Santa Barbara. She worked on Neurochemistry with Stanley Parsons. Quintanar Vera joined Stanford University for her PhD, working on metalloproteins under the supervision of Edward I. Solomon. She focussed on the structure, function and activation mechanism of multicopper oxidase.

== Career ==
Quintanar Vera returned to Mexico and join the National Autonomous University of Mexico Department of Neurochemistry of the Institute of Physiology. She worked on manganese neurotoxicity. She joined CINVESTAV in 2005, where she studies the proteins associated with neurodegenerative diseases. Alzheimer's disease can cause proteins to aggregate and accumulate metals. She studies the role of metals in the aggregation of proteins and the etiology of diseases.

Quintanar Vera was a Fulbright scholar at Massachusetts Institute of Technology working with Jonathan King between 2014 and 2015. Her project looked at the role of copper ions in human Gamma-D crystallin. Quintanar Vera was appointed to the Society International Biological Inorganic Chemistry in 2017. In 2017 she coordinated the Thematic Network of Structure, Function and Evolution of Proteins (REFEP).

=== Awards and honours ===
2017 Mexican Academy of Sciences Research Prize for Science

2016 Marcos Moshinsky Chair

2014 Fulbright Scholarship

2007 L'Oréal-UNESCO For Women in Science Awards
