= Roscoe Lee Browne =

American actor and director (1922–2007)

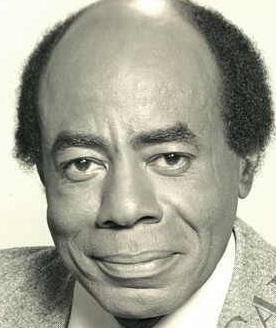
- Browne in 1979
- Born: May 2, 1922; Woodbury, New Jersey, U.S.
- Died: April 11, 2007 (aged 84); Los Angeles, California, U.S.
- Education: Lincoln University; Middlebury College; Columbia University; University of Florence
- Occupations: Actor; stage director
- Years active: 1956–2007

Roscoe Lee Browne (May 2, 1922 – April 11, 2007) was an American actor and director. He is perhaps best known for his many guest appearances on TV series from the 1970s and 1980s, as well as movies like The Cowboys (1972) with John Wayne, and The World's Greatest Athlete (1973) with John Amos and Jan-Michael Vincent, but his biggest roles were as narrator in Babe and Garfield: A Tale of Two Kitties, which grossed $400 million combined.

He resisted playing stereotypically black roles, instead performing in several productions with New York City's Shakespeare Festival Theater, Leland Hayward's satirical NBC series That Was the Week That Was, and a poetry performance tour of the United States in addition to his work in television and film. He was the recipient of a Primetime Emmy and a NAACP Image Award, and was nominated for a Tony Award.

== Early life and education ==
Born in Woodbury, New Jersey, Browne was the fourth son of Baptist minister Sylvanus S. Browne and his wife, Lovie Lee (Usher). He graduated from Woodbury Junior-Senior High School in 1939. Browne attended historically black Lincoln University in Pennsylvania, where he was an All-American for the Lincoln Lions track and field team. He graduated with a bachelor's degree in 1946, his college career being interrupted by his wartime service.

During World War II, Browne served in Italy with the United States Army's 92nd Infantry Division and organized the Division's track and field team. After the war, he undertook postgraduate work under the GI Bill at Middlebury College, Columbia University, and the University of Florence. A middle-distance runner, he won two Amateur Athletic Union 1,000-yard national indoor championships.

He occasionally returned to Lincoln University between 1946–52 to teach English, French, and comparative literature. Upon leaving academia, he earned a living for several years selling wine for Schenley Import Corporation. In 1956, he left his job with Schenley to become a full-time professional actor.

In 1950 and 1951 he toured Europe (as a half-miler) with a USA Track and Field team.

== Career ==
=== Acting ===
Browne was determined not to accept the stereotypical roles routinely offered to African-American actors. He also wanted to do more than act and narrate. Despite the apprehensions of his friends, in the summer of 1956, Browne managed to land the roles of The Soothsayer and Pindarus in Julius Caesar, and one of Petruchio's servants in The Taming of the Shrew directed by Stuart Vaughan and produced by Joseph Papp for New York City's first Shakespeare in the Park. More work with the NY Shakespeare Festival Theater followed.

Browne then voiced an offscreen part as camera operator J.J. Burden in The Connection (1961), his first movie role.

His stage success brought him to the attention of producer Leland Hayward, and in 1964 he began a regular stint as a cast member on Hayward's satirical NBC-TV series That Was the Week That Was.

In 1966, he wrote and made his directorial stage debut with A Hand Is On The Gate, starring Cicely Tyson, James Earl Jones, and Moses Gunn. A lifelong bachelor who coveted his privacy in the turbulent decades of the civil rights revolution, Browne avoided participation in public protests, preferring instead to be "more effective on stage with metaphor... than in the streets with an editorial".

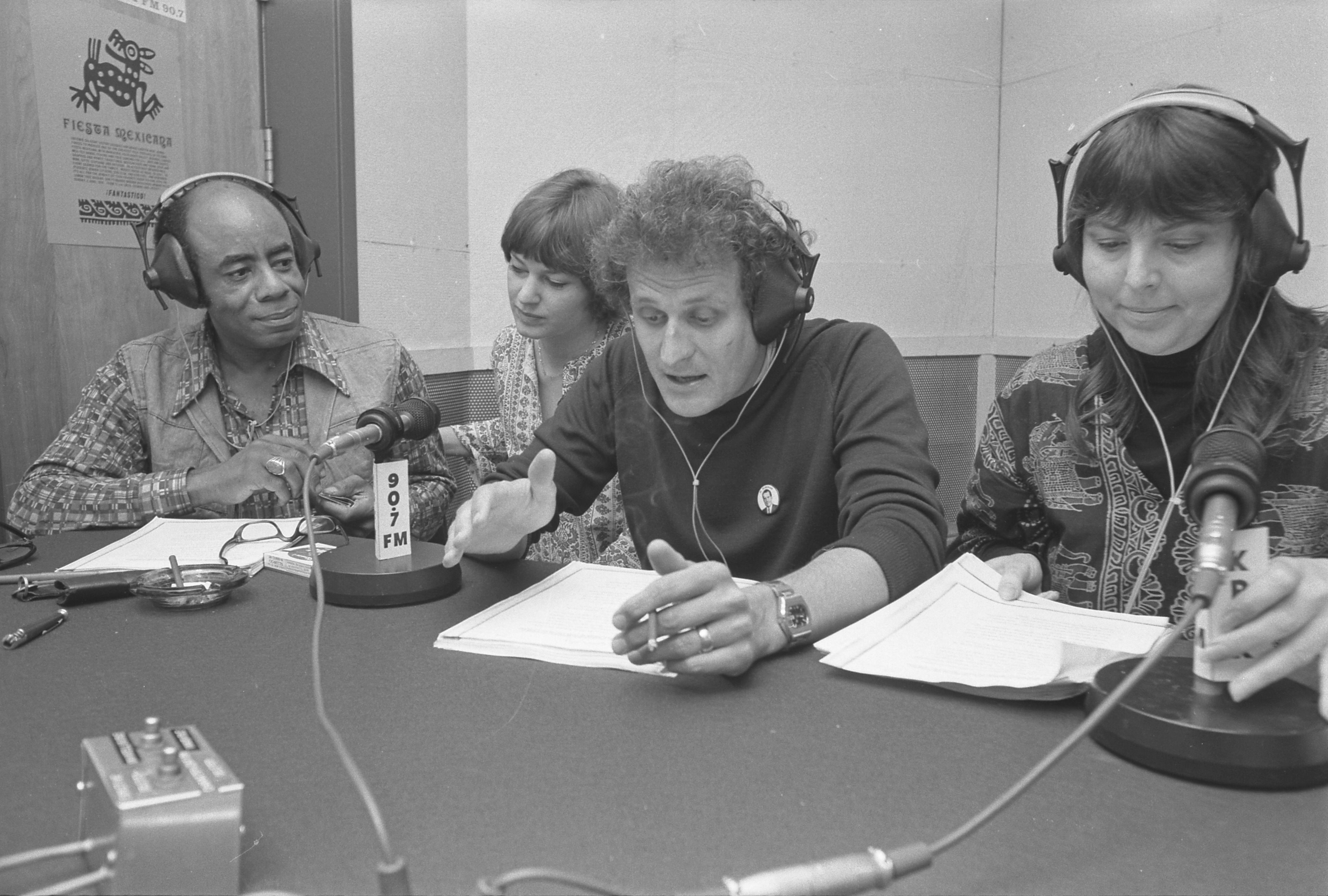
Browne with Kate Rickman, Peter Bonerz, and Sally Smaller performing a reading of the Watergate tapes on KPFK radio in Los Angeles in 1974

Starting in the late 1960s, Browne was a frequent guest star on TV in both comedy and dramatic shows such as Mannix, All in the Family, Maude, Good Times, Sanford and Son, A Different World and dozens of others.

In The Cowboys (1972), in a role as a camp cook, he led a group of young cowhands avenging the death of John Wayne's character in the movie.

Browne was much in demand for narration and voice-over parts in film and on commercial sound recordings. In 1977, Browne narrated a record album, The Story of Star Wars, which presented an abridged version of the events depicted in the first released film using the dialogue and sound effects. The recording was produced by George Lucas and Alan Livingston.

In 1980, he guest-starred in an episode of Benson with Robert Guillaume. Later that year, he joined the regular cast of Benson's parent show Soap where he played Saunders, the erudite butler who replaces Benson. Browne also appeared as Professor Foster on The Cosby Show in 1986, winning a Primetime Emmy Award for Outstanding Guest Actor in a Comedy Series.

He and fellow actor Anthony Zerbe toured the United States with their poetry performance piece Behind the Broken Words. It included readings of poetry, some of it written by Browne, as well as performances of comedy and dramatic works.

Browne found additional success performing in the plays of August Wilson, both on Broadway and at the Pittsburgh Public Theater. He was described as having "a baritone voice like a sable coat", speaking with a strong mid-Atlantic accent. To someone who once said he sounded "too white", Browne replied, "I'm sorry, I once had a white maid." Four years before his death, Browne narrated a series of WPA slave narratives in the HBO film, Unchained Memories (2003).

=== Directing ===
Browne's directorial credits include a piece called An Evening of Negro Poetry and Folk Music at the Delacorte Theatre and the Public Theatre in New York City in 1966. It was also produced as A Hand Is on the Gate at the Longacre Theatre in New York City in 1966. The production was revived at the Afro-American Studio in New York City, running from 1976 to 1977.

== Birth year ==
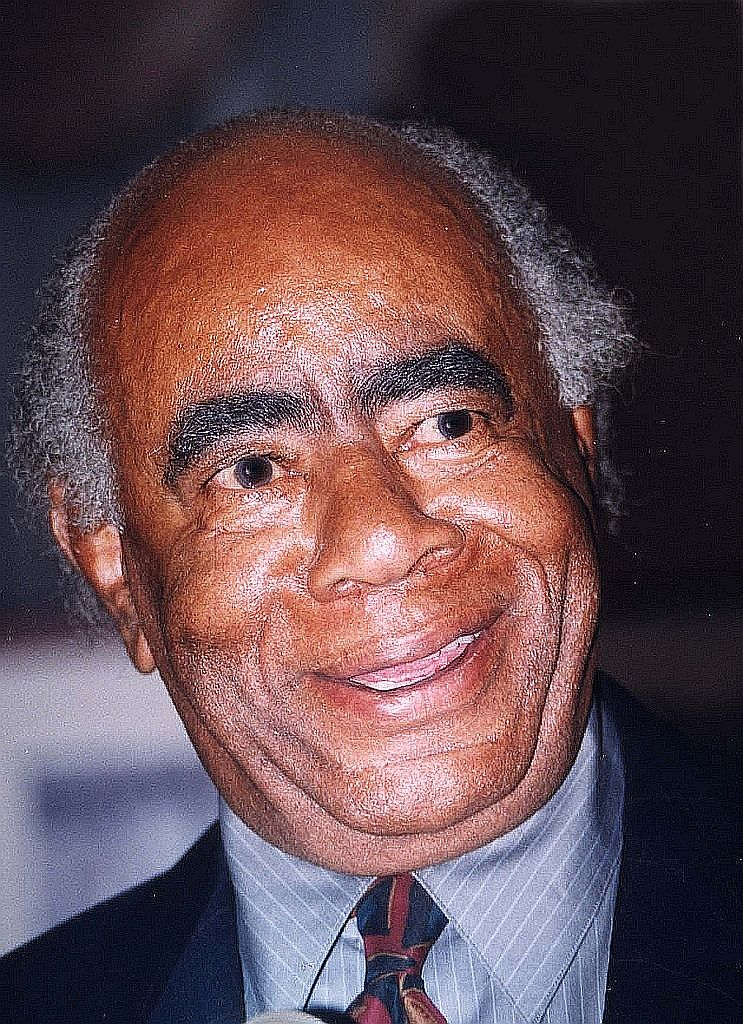
Browne in 1999

Some year-of-birth records, including the Social Security Death Index, state that Browne was born on May 2, 1922, while other sources claim that he was born three years later, on May 2, 1925. Those sources include The New York Times, Los Angeles Times, Variety, the Associated Press and several others, including a Congressional Resolution.

In an interview with Camille Cosby for the National Visionary Leadership Project (NVLP), Browne confirmed that he was born in 1922.

== Death ==
Browne died of stomach cancer at Cedars Sinai Medical Center in Los Angeles on the morning of April 11, 2007, aged 84. He never married and had no children.

== Awards and recognition ==
- Los Angeles Drama Critics Circle Award – Best Actor Award, for his performance as "Makak" in Derek Walcott's The Dream on Monkey Mountain, 1970
- Bronze Wrangler, the Western Heritage Award – a shared award with the production, for Theatrical Motion Picture, for "The Cowboys," a Warner Brothers film, 1972
- Primetime Emmy Award nomination – Outstanding Single Performance by a Supporting Actor in a Comedy or Drama Series, for ABC's Barney Miller: The Escape Artist, 1976
- Inducted into the Black Filmmakers Hall of Fame, 1977
- Primetime Emmy Award – Outstanding Guest Performer in a Comedy Series, for The Cosby Show: The Card Game, 1986
- NAACP Image Award – Outstanding Actor in a Comedy Series, for The Cosby Show, 1986
- Los Angeles Drama Critics Circle Award – Best Actor Award, for his performance as "Bynum Walker" in August Wilson's Joe Turner's Come and Gone, 1989
- Soap Opera Digest Award nomination – Outstanding Villain: Prime Time, for Falcon Crest, 1989
- Tony Award nomination – Best Featured Actor in a Play, for his performance as "Holloway" in August Wilson's Two Trains Running, directed by Lloyd Richards, 1992
- Helen Hayes Award – Outstanding Supporting Performer, Non-Resident Production, for Two Trains Running, 1992
- Daytime Emmy Award nomination – Outstanding Performer in an Animated Program, for his performance as "The Kingpin" in Spider-Man, 1995
- Inducted posthumously into the American Theater Hall of Fame, 2008

== Filmography ==
=== Film ===
Year	Title	Role	Notes
1961	The Connection	J.J. Burden	
1964	Pie in the Sky	Preacher	
1964	Black Like Me	Christopher	
1967	The Comedians	Petit Pierre	
1968	Uptight	Clarence	
1969	Topaz	Philippe Dubois	
1970	The Liberation of L.B. Jones	L.B. Jones	
1971	The Cowboys	Jebediah Nightlinger	
1972	Cisco Pike	Music Store Owner	
1972	Ra	Narrator (voice)	
1973	The World's Greatest Athlete	Gazenga	
1973	Super Fly T.N.T.	Lamine Sonko	
1974	Uptown Saturday Night	Congressman Lincoln	
1976	Logan's Run	Box (voice and in-suit performance)	
1977	Twilight's Last Gleaming	James Forrest	
1977	The Story of Star Wars	Narrator (voice)	
1980	Nothing Personal	Paxton	
1986	Legal Eagles	Judge Dawkins	
1986	Jumpin' Jack Flash	Archer Lincoln	
1988	Oliver & Company	Francis (voice)	
1990	Moon 44	Chairman Hall	Uncredited
1992	Noel	Brutus (voice)	
1992	The Mambo Kings	Fernando Perez	
1992	Eddie Presley	Doc	
1993	Naked in New York	Mr. Ried	
1995	Last Summer in the Hamptons	Freddy	
1995	The Pompatus of Love	Leonard Folder	
1995	Babe	Narrator (voice)	
1996	Dear God	Idris Abraham	
1996	Forest Warrior	Clovis Madison	
1998	Babe: Pig in the City	Narrator (voice)	
1998	Judas Kiss	Chief Bleeker	
2001	Morgan's Ferry	Peabo	
2002	Treasure Planet	Mr. Arrow (voice)	
2003	Unchained Memories	Reader	
2006	Sweet Deadly Dreams	Devlin	
2006	Garfield: A Tail of Two Kitties	Narrator (voice)	
2007	Epic Movie	Narrator (voice)	
2007	Smiley Face	Himself	Released posthumously

=== Television ===
Year	Title	Role	Notes
1963	Espionage	Mbana	Episode: "The Whistling Shrimp"
1968	The Invaders	Arnold Warren	Episode: "The Vise"
1968	Insight	Stranger	Episode: "Watts Made Out of Thread"
1968	Mannix	Andrew Josephus	2 episodes
1969	The Outcasts	Gideon	Episode: "Gideon"
1969–70	The Name of the Game	Dean Marshall, Wamumba	2 episodes
1972	Bonanza	Joshua	Episode: "He Was Only Seven"
1972	Sanford and Son	Osgood Wilcox	Episode: "Jealousy"
1972–73	All in the Family	Jean Duval, Hugh Thompson	2 episodes
1973	The Streets of San Francisco	Yale Dancy	Episode: "A Trout in the Milk"
1974	Good Times	Reverend Sam	Episode: "God's Business Is Good Business"
1975	Barney Miller	Charlie Jeffers	Episode: "Escape Artist"
1977	Starsky & Hutch	Quatraine	Episode: "Starsky and Hutch on Voodoo Island"
1977–78	Maude	Mr. Butterfield	2 episodes
1978	King	Philip Harrison	3 episodes
1980	Benson	Howard Walker	Episode: "Just Friends"
1980–81	Soap	Saunders	16 episodes
1981	The Haunting of Harrington House	Diogenes Chase	Television film
1983	Magnum, P.I.	Carlton	Episode: "Of Sound Mind"
1983	For Us the Living: The Medgar Evers Story	Gloster Current	Television film
1986	Head of the Class	Mr. Thomas	Episode: "Teacher's Teacher"
1986	John Grin's Christmas	Ghost of Christmas Past	Television film
1986	The Greatest Adventure: Stories from the Bible	Magus	Episode: "The Nativity"
1986–87	The Cosby Show	Barnabus Foster	2 episodes
1987	227	Albert Henry	Episode: "Men's Club"
1987	Visionaries: Knights of the Magical Light	Reekon, Merklynn (voice)	13 episodes
1988	The Real Ghostbusters	Edward Zeddemore (voice)	Episode: "The Brooklyn Triangle"
1988	Highway to Heaven	Dr. Hudsbeth	Episode: "Country Doctor"
1988	Falcon Crest	Rosemont	10 episodes
1988–92	A Different World	Barnabus Foster	4 episodes
1989	Ring Raiders	Max Miles (voice)	5 episodes
1990	Columbo	Dr. Steadman	Episode: "Rest in Peace, Mrs. Columbo"
1990	Father Dowling Mysteries	Dennis Cray	Episode: "The Passionate Painter Mystery"
1992, 2003	Law & Order	Idris Balewa, Aaron Miller	2 episodes
1993–94	SeaQuest DSV	Raleigh Young	2 episodes
1994	Batman: The Animated Series	Dr. Wakati (voice)	Episode: "Time Out of Joint"
1994	The John Larroquette Show	Mr. Davis	Episode: "The Job"
1995	Happily Ever After: Fairy Tales for Every Child	Friar Ferdinand (voice)	Episode: "Rumpelstiltskin"
1995	Freakazoid!	Great Mystic Gnome (voice)	Episode: "Lawn Gnomes: Chapter IV – Fun in the Sun"
1995	Phantom 2040	Old Guran (voice)	Episode: "The Sins of the Fathers"
1995–98	Spider-Man: The Animated Series	Kingpin (voice)	35 episodes
1996	New York Undercover	Dr. Johnson	Episode: "Bad Blood"
1996	Cosby	George Lucas	Episode: "The Broken Reflection"
1999	Hope Island	Patrick Bradley	2 episodes
1999	ER	Matthew Lynn	Episode: "Rites of Spring"
1999-2000	The Wild Thornberrys	Komodo Dragon, Goulam (voice)	2 episodes
2002	The Shield	Bryce Wyms	Episode: "Throwaway"
2003	The Proud Family	Clarence St. John (voice)	Episode: "Wedding Bell Blues"
2003–04	Static Shock	Dr. Anokye (voice)	2 episodes
2004	Tales of a Fly on the Wall	Narrator (voice)	Television film
2004	Will & Grace	Linus	Episode: "The Newlydreads"
2007	Side Order of Life	Clarence	Episode: "Pilot"

== Theatre ==
- The Taming of the Shrew, New York Shakespeare Festival, East River Park Amphitheater, New York City, 1956.
- Soothsayer and Pindarus, Julius Caesar, New York Shakespeare Festival, East River Park Amphitheater, 1956.
- Aaron, Titus Andronicus, New York Shakespeare Festival, Theatre of Emmanuel Presbyterian Church, New York City, 1957.
- Balthazar, Romeo and Juliet, New York Shakespeare Festival, New York City, 1957.
- Cothurnus, Aria da Capo, Theatre Marquee, New York City, 1958.
- Understudy for title role, Othello, New York Shakespeare Festival, Belvedere Lake Theatre, New York City, 1958.
- Royal Baron, The Cool World, Eugene O'Neill Theatre, New York City, 1960.
- Understudy for title role, Purlie Victorious, Cort Theatre, New York City, 1961.
- Archibald Wellington, The Blacks: A Clown Show, St. Mark's Playhouse, New York City, 1961–62.
- Corporal, General Seeger, Lyceum Theatre, New York City, 1962.
- Deacon Sitter Morris, Tiger, Tiger Burning Bright, Booth Theatre, New York City, 1962–63.
- Fool, King Lear, New York Shakespeare Festival, Delacorte Theatre, Public Theatre, New York City, 1962.
- Brecht on Brecht (revue), Theatre de Lys, now Lucille Lortel Theatre, New York City, 1962, then Arena Stage, Washington, DC, performed as a staged reading at Sheridan Square Playhouse, New York City, and at Delacorte Theatre, Public Theatre, all 1963.
- Autolycus, The Winter's Tale, New York Shakespeare Festival, Delacorte Theatre, Public Theatre, 1963.
- Narrator, The Ballad of the Sad Cafe, Martin Beck Theatre, New York City, 1963.
- Street singer, The Threepenny Opera, Arena Stage, 1963.
- Babu, Benito Cereno, American Place Theatre, New York City, beginning 1963, later produced as part of a double-bill titled The Old Glory, Theatre of St. Clement's Church, New York City, 1964.
- Hell Is Other People (readings), Theatre at Carnegie Hall, New York City, 1964.
- Male lead, The Empty Room, Village South Theatre, New York City, 1964.
- St. Just, Danton's Death, Vivian Beaumont Theatre, Lincoln Center, New York City, 1965.
- Ulysses, Troilus and Cressida, New York Shakespeare Festival, Delacorte Theatre, Public Theatre, 1965.
- Beyond the Fringe, Goodspeed Opera House, East Haddam, CT, 1966.
- Babu, Benito Cereno, Playhouse in the Park, Cincinnati, OH, 1966.
- The gardener, Sodom and Gomorrah, Playhouse in the Park, 1966.
- Mendoza, Man and Superman, Playhouse in the Park, 1966.
- Sheridan Whiteside, The Man Who Came to Dinner, Long Wharf Theatre, New Haven, CT, 1966.
- An Evening of Negro Poetry and Folk Music, Delacorte Theatre, Public Theatre, 1966; produced as A Hand Is on the Gate, Longacre Theatre, New York City, 1966; revived at Afro-American Studio, New York City, 1976–77.
- Mosca, Volpone, New York Shakespeare Festival, Mobile Theatre, New York City, 1967.
- Makak, The Dream on Monkey Mountain, Center Theatre Group, Mark Taper Forum, Los Angeles, 1970, then St. Mark's Playhouse, 1971.
- A Rap on Race, New Theatre for Now, Los Angeles, 1971–72.
- As You Like It, Pilgrimage Theatre, Los Angeles, 1973.
- Ephraim Cabot, Desire Under the Elms, The Marshall Migatz Memorial Season, Academy Festival Theatre, Lake Forest, Illinois, 1974.
- Behind the Broken Words (poetry reading), With Anthony Zerbe. Washington Theatre Club, Washington, DC, 1974, revived at American Place Theatre, 1981, and Denver Center for the Performing Arts, Denver, CO, 2002.
- Babu, Benito Cereno, American Place Theatre, 1976.
- Albert Perez Jordan, Remembrance, New York Shakespeare Festival, Other Stage, Public Theatre, New York City, 1979.
- Pantomime, Goodman Theatre, Chicago, 1981–82.
- Right Reverend J. D. Montgomery, My One and Only, St. James Theatre, New York City, 1983–84.
- M. Noirtier, The Count of Monte Cristo, Eisenhower Theatre, Kennedy Center for the Performing Arts, Washington, DC, 1985.
- Joe Turner's Come and Gone, Los Angeles Theatre Center, Los Angeles, 1989, then Pittsburgh Public Theatre, Pittsburgh, PA, 1989–90.
- Holloway, Two Trains Running, Eisenhower Theatre, Kennedy Center for the Performing Arts, 1991, then Walter Kerr Theatre, New York City, 1992.
- House of Flowers, as Roscoe Lee Brown. City Center Encores!, City Center Theatre, New York City, 2003.

== Other work ==
=== Recordings ===
- Enjoyment of Poetry: Memorial Program for Claude McKay, Archive of Recorded Poetry and Literature, 1967.
- The Story of Star Wars, 20th Century Fox Records, 1977
- Poems, by Edna St. Vincent Millay, Archive of Recorded Poetry and Literature, 1968.
- Caribbean, Random House Audio, 1989.
- Selected Shorts: A Celebration of the Short Story, Listening Library, 1989.
- Martin Luther King Edition: New Testament Value Pack, World Bible Publishing Company, 1991.
- Audio Bible, World Bible Publishing, 1991.
- Bible for Today, New Testament, 1992.
- The Autobiography of Malcolm X, with Joe Morton. Simon & Schuster Audio, 1992.
- M. C. Higgins, the Great, by Virginia Hamilton Recorded Books, 1993.
- Kwanzaa Folktales, by Gordon Lewis, Warner Adult, 1994.
- The Word Workout: 10 Easy Exercises for a Stronger Vocabulary, Dove Books Audio, 1995.
- The Complete Sonnets of William Shakespeare: With A Lover's Complaint and Selected Songs, Dove Books Audio, 1996.
- The Poetry of Robert Frost, Dove Books Audio, 1996.
- Masterpieces of Modern Short Fiction, Audio Literature, 1998.
- The Haunting of Hill House, New Star Media, 1999.
- The Bible: Old Testament, King James Version, Audio Literature, 2001.
- The Poetry of Robert Frost, New Millennium Audio, 2001.
- The Poetry of Walt Whitman, New Millennium Audio, 2001.
- KJV on Cassette: New Testament, Nelson Bibles, 2003.

Narrated the Nativity Story on a Christmas card and cassette tape alongside Glenda Hayes who sung "Silent Night".

=== Radio appearances ===
- Native villager, The Endless Road, CBS Radio Workshop, CBS, 1956.
- Performer of Shakespearean roles for CBC Radio.

=== Writings ===
- An Evening of Negro Poetry and Folk Music (readings), Delacorte Theatre, Public Theatre, 1966, produced as A Hand Is on the Gate, Longacre Theatre, New York City, 1966, revived at Afro-American Studio, New York City, 1976–77.
- Behind the Broken Words (poetry reading), Washington Theatre Club, Washington, DC, 1974, revived at American Place Theatre, New York City, 1981, and Denver Center for the Performing Arts, 2002.
