= Sex and Temperament in Three Primitive Societies =

1935 book by Margaret Mead

- Title page for Sex and Temperament in Three Primitive Societies (1963 edition)
- Author: Margaret Mead
- Language: English
- Subject: Anthropology, gender roles, Papua New Guinea
- Genre: Ethnography
- Publisher: William Morrow and Company (New York); Routledge (London)
- Publication date: 1935
- Publication place: United States
- Media type: Print
- Pages: xxii + 335
- OCLC: 816690
- Preceded by: Growing Up in New Guinea
- Followed by: Male and Female

Sex and Temperament in Three Primitive Societies is a book by anthropologist Margaret Mead, published in 1935. Based on her ethnographic fieldwork, Mead profiled three New Guinea cultures with distinct gender systems, and explored the question of what happens when an individual's emotional disposition is at odds with society's gender expectations.

The focus of the book is temperament, that is patterns of personality and emotions, and "with the cultural assumptions that certain temperamental attitudes are 'naturally' masculine and others 'naturally' feminine." The three societies in question were all in the Sepik River basin of Papua New Guinea: the Mountain Arapesh people, the Mundugumor (or Biwat) people, the Tchambuli (now spelled Chambri) people. Mead describes how "each tribe has certain definite attitudes towards temperament, a theory of what human beings, either men or women or both, are naturally like, a norm in terms of which to judge and condemn those individuals who deviate from it."

Mead's most visible conclusion was that:

If those temperamental attitudes which we have traditionally regarded as feminine—such as passivity, responsiveness, and a willingness to cherish children—can so easily be set up as the masculine pattern in one tribe, and in another be outlawed for the majority of the women as well as for the majority of men, we no longer have any basis for regarding such aspects of behavior as sex-linked.

The distinction between femininity and masculinity on the one hand, and biological sex on the other presaged the sex–gender distinction, which is at the core of the sociology of gender roles and a central concept in feminist thought.

David Lipset characterized Sex and Temperament as "an important event in the history of both the culture concept and feminist theory" and as "an unmatched ethnographic comparison of three Sepik groups." According to Maureen Malloy, Sex and Temperament "consolidated [Mead's] reputation as someone committed to questioning the sexual taboos of the contemporary West, grounding her views in intrepid research among exotic savages and conveying her research in accessible books that reached a wide public.." Micaela di Leonardo chronicles the wide reception of the book as feminist, but argues that "the text articulated Mead's shift to the Freudian antiwomen's rights stance she maintained until the 1970s."

== Fieldwork ==
Mead conducted eighteen months of field research for Sex and Temperament while working jointly with her husband Reo Fortune from 1931 to 1933. The couple had previously worked as researchers on Manus (six months in 1928–29) and on an Omaha reservation in Nebraska (three months in 1930). Mead and Fortune first spent eight months studying Mountain Arapesh culture in "a small mountaintop hamlet" that felt physically and culturally isolated to them. They next moved to Mundugumor village on a river, which had been affected by both colonial pacification efforts (suppressing tribal warfare) and labor recruitment. Mead reports that she and Fortune consulted with on a final fieldsite with colonial district officer Eric Robinson, who proposed either the Washkuks or the Tchambuli. Initial scouting of the Washkuk community found it both remote and dispersed and the ethnographers opted to live with Tchambuli. Mead and Fortune then met fellow anthropologist Gregory Bateson and moved to Tchambuli Lake and their final field site, with Bateson continuing his fieldwork nearby with the Iatmul culture. Mead and Bateson began a romantic affair during this time, and Fortune eventually refused to share his ethnographic notes on the Mundugumor and Tchambuli with Mead for the book.

== Ethnographic description ==
The book is divided into four parts, covering "the Mountain-Dwelling Arapesh," "the River-Dwelling Mundugumor," and the "Lake-Dwelling Tchambuli," and finally in Part Four, analyzing the socialization into gendered temperament across these societies and in the West. According to Mead, while both the Arapesh and the Mundugumor have a gender division of labor and roles, their expecations about emotional temperament are the same for men and women: "any idea that temperamental traits of the order of dominance, bravery, aggressiveness, objectivity, malleability, are inalienably associated with one sex (as opposed to the other) is entirely lacking" She describes the Mountain Arapesh as "trained to be co-operative, unaggressive, responsive to the needs and demands of others" and the Mundugumor as "ruthless, aggressive, positively sexed individuals, with the maternal cherishing aspects of personality at a mininum." Her emotional characterization of the Tchambuli defines women as "the dominant, impersonal managing partner" and men as "the less responsible and emotionally dependent person."

Mead's characterizations of each of the three peoples has been subject to vigorous scholarly debate, including by her research collaborator and ex-husband Reo Fortune (on the Arapesh), Nancy McDowell (on the Mundugumor), and Deborah Gewertz and Frederick Errington (on the Tchambuli),

== Critical evaluation of findings ==
Deborah Gewertz studied the Chambri (called Tchambuli by Mead) in 1974–1975 with Frederick Errington. She observed in 1981 that most male–female interactions involved men acting assertively and women responding submissively. In her scholarship, she questioned whether either dominance and sexual roles is the best way to understand the relations between Chambri men and women, noting that Mead's description of female dominance contradicted men's formal authority within Chambri society. She found that men's devotion to artistry in the 1930s was a consequence of recent historical events: the destruction of Chambri villages in a conflict with the Iatmul village of Parambei and their recent return required them to rebuild men's houses. She also speculated that "the strained and watchful character that Mead observed" among them may also be a consequence of this conflict. She concluded that the male and female temperaments Mead observed "reflect[ed] a temporary shift" due to economic changes, shifting relationships, and this conflict. Returning to the subject in 1991 with Frederick Errington, she wrote that, "Chambri women did not dominate over Chambri men. Nor, because the political strategies and spheres of Chambri men and women were largely distinct, did Chambri men dominate over Chambri women." They concluded that men and women "could operate largely autonomously from the other, without being subject to coercion."

Jessie Bernard criticized Mead's interpretations of her findings and argued that Mead's descriptions were subjective. Bernard argues that Mead claimed the Mundugumor women were temperamentally identical to men, but her reports indicate that there were in fact sex differences; Mundugumor women hazed each other less than men hazed each other and made efforts to make themselves physically desirable to others, married women had fewer affairs than married men, women were not taught to use weapons, women were used less as hostages and Mundugumor men engaged in physical fights more often than women. In contrast, the Arapesh were also described as equal in temperament, but Bernard states that Mead's own writings indicate that men physically fought over women, yet women did not fight over men. The Arapesh also seemed to have some conception of sex differences in temperament, as they would sometimes describe a woman as acting like a particularly quarrelsome man. Bernard also questioned if the behavior of men and women in those societies differed as much from Western behavior as Mead claimed. Bernard argued that some of her descriptions could be equally descriptive of a Western context.
