= Portrayal of women scientists in film =

Films have portrayed professional women in science, technology, engineering, and mathematics (STEM) fields in various ways throughout film history.

== Overview ==
The study of female characters in film began with movements from the 1960s and 1970s in the form of second-wave feminism, the rise of independent films, and the beginning of academic film studies. Some films promote certain socially defined female stereotypical archetypes that often combine job stereotypes with gender stereotypes. The use of these stereotypes in film has been suggested to contribute to a questionable portrayal of women, especially revolving around themes of violence, sexuality, objectification, and subordination.

== Examples of female scientists in film ==
=== Early 20th century ===
The presentation of women as scientists on film goes back to the early days of cinema.

The first known presentation may be 1929's Woman in the Moon. Written by Thea von Harbou and directed by Fritz Lang, the film follows a group of Germans as they travel to the Moon. The group includes Friede Velten, an assistant on the trip, who chooses between two potential husbands and ultimately decides to stay on the Moon and live a new life there.

It would take almost ten years before another woman scientist would appear onscreen. When she did, Alice Swallow was a side character, a hard worker who was too busy to marry Cary Grant, who turned to fun-loving socialite Katharine Hepburn instead. Nevertheless, 1938's Bringing up Baby showed millions of people around the world a level-headed, independent woman who did not need to rely on a man to move her life forward.

The earliest portrayal of a real-life woman scientist may be the 1943 film Madame Curie starring Greer Garson as Polish-French physicist Marie Curie in 1890s Paris.

These portrayals in A-list movies were rare and it would take decades before they become more common-place. However, the 1950s saw a proliferation of low-budget American B-movies which show-cased female scientists and post-graduates. They were normally associated with a male boss and involved in a romantic storyline, as well as a scientific one.

One of the earliest B-movie portrayals of a fictional qualified scientist may be 1951's Flight to Mars which tells the story of male engineer and his assistant Carol Stafford, who earned her degree in "spaceship engineering".

1951 also saw Unknown World where a group of scientists, including Dr Joan Lindsey, drill into the earth to create an underground environment where humanity could escape and survive a future nuclear holocaust.

=== Late 20th century ===
After the Swinging Sixties in the west, women began to feature front and centre of large-budget movies, often in a more serious tone.

An early example was the 1970 film The Andromeda Strain which showed Dr Ruth Leavitt as one of several scientists investigating a deadly organism of extraterrestrial origin.

Other examples include;

=== Gorillas in the Mist (1988) ===
Gorillas in the Mist is a film based on the book with the same title by Dian Fossey and follows her as she leaves the United States to study gorillas in Rwanda and Uganda. As she bonds with the gorillas, she worries about poachers and devotes her time to protecting the animals. In the film, Fossey is said to be depicted as an independent woman, breaking the common trope of women being the homemaker. This may be seen as an unusual portrayal of women scientists and it concentrates on the scientific work, and does not have a romantic story attached to it.

=== Jurassic Park (1993) ===
The 1993 film Jurassic Park, based on the novel with the same title by Michael Crichton, depicts a fictional paleobotanist, Dr. Ellie Sattler. She is shown to have extensive knowledge about dinosaurs and plant life throughout the movie. She is said to be portrayed with great physical ability, allowing her to survive multiple attacks from dinosaurs.

=== Contact ===
Contact was released in 1997 and told the fictional story of Dr Eleanor "Ellie" Arroway, a SETI scientist who finds evidence of extraterrestrial life and is chosen by the government to make first contact.

=== Nutty Professor II: The Klumps (2000) ===
Nutty Professor II: The Klumps is the sequel to the 1996 slapstick, science-fiction dark comedy, The Nutty Professor. Janet Jackson portrays molecular biologist Denise Gains. Denise is the love-interest for the male hero, Sherman Klump. Gaines faces a dilemma where she must balance her professional career with her romantic relationships. In this film, she is hesitant to take a full professorship at the University of Maine, but she will be able to stay and pursue further research with Klump.

=== Gravity (2013) ===
The 2013 film Gravity, directed by Alfonso Cuarón and starring Sandra Bullock and George Clooney, is often cited as a feminist film due to Bullock's starring role as an astronaut.

The film has been critiqued that Gravity "proves that a woman can anchor an action-packed blockbuster that does not have to include violence, superheroes, weapons and/or huge death tolls." While the film's lead is a woman, she gets help from her male counterpart, played by Clooney. Some critics describe Bullock's character as "the very model of the damsel in distress," as she can never get out of a situation on her own and must lean on Clooney's character to do the heavy lifting. The role of Bullock's character is thought to be an act of defiant feminism, as she is the lead in a science fiction film, but some viewers find that the film actually subscribes to traditional gender stereotypes and does not portray Bullock's character as a true independent woman. In contrast, Vanessa Reich-Shackelford from Westcoast Women in Engineering, Science, and Technology while considering the character of Dr. Ryan Stone, wrote: "I came to realize that writers Alfonso (also director) and Jonás Cuarón had created one of the most positive representations of a woman in STEM on screen so far."

=== Arrival (2016) ===
The 2016 film Arrival revolves around the character of linguist Dr. Louise Banks, played by Amy Adams, who facilitates the very first instance of human communicative contact with an alien population. The film makes an obvious effort at employing a feminist theme, primarily through the way the backstory shapes Dr. Banks and frames her as an accomplished professional and mother.

=== Hidden Figures ===
Hidden Figures was released in 2016 and told the true story of three female African-American mathematicians, Katherine Johnson, Dorothy Vaughan and Mary Jackson (engineer) who worked at NASA during the Space Race.

=== Black Panther (2018) ===
The critically acclaimed film Black Panther features Princess Shuri, a young, Black, female character who excels in the STEM field as an intelligent and creative technology whiz and inventor. Portrayed by Letitia Wright, Princess Shuri is the younger sister of T'Challa (Chadwick Boseman), the eventual king of Wakanda, and the mastermind behind harnessing the power of vibranium, specifically in the creation of the Black Panther suit.

The Marvel Cinematic Universe has portrayed over 60 fictional scientists, about a quarter of them being women, including computer expert Dr Helen Cho, biologist Dr Maya Hensen and biochemist Agent Jemma Simmons.

== Archetypes of scientific women in films ==
Eva Flicker, writing in 2002, noted that in science fiction films, men are overwhelmingly portrayed as scientists, making up 82% of all film scientists. The majority of films that include female scientists and engineers as primary characters are placed into the action, adventure and comedy genre.

Women in majority of films including the science fiction genre, often fall into six categories:

=== The Old Maid ===
This type of woman scientist is "only interested in her work" and is often depicted having a nondescript appearance and style, with strong competency. Typically, as the film progresses, a man saves her. This male salvation consequently brings out the feminine side of "the old maid", after which she is intended to become more conventionally attractive. However, she loses credibility as an academic and suddenly makes more mistakes than when she did not focus as much on her appearance. Based on this type of story, Flicker concludes that "femininity and intelligence are mutually exclusive characteristics in a woman's film role." An example of this woman in a film can be seen in Spellbound, in the character Dr. Constance Peterson.

=== The Male Woman ===
This type of woman works with men in an all male environment. Because of this, she has a "harsh voice" and occasionally "succumbs to an unhealthy lifestyle," such as partaking in smoking and drinking, to fit in with her male counterparts. Flicker claims that this type of woman is "lost somewhere in the middle" of masculinity and femininity, meaning she is not as sexual a character as other women are, but she is also not on the same level as the men she works with. This decreases her credibility both as a woman and as one trying to fit into "a man's world." In the end, her heightened female emotions allow her to contribute to a solution, which is her redeeming quality as a character. The "male woman" character appears in the 1970 science fiction film Andromeda Strain.

=== The Naïve Expert ===
Seen in The Lost World: Jurassic Park, this woman scientist is described as a character that does minimal work. For the sake of the dramatization of the film, she is crucial, but typically she does not advance the story and does not contribute much to the solution. Instead, her femininity causes more trouble for the team of scientists. She is portrayed as young, attractive, and is subjected to experience feminine emotions which add an extra layer to the existing predicament, forcing the man to solve the problem to get the team out of trouble. She is "naïve in her actions," messing up every task that is given to her despite her extensive education and knowledge, while her male counterpart stands in stark contrast and ends up saving the day.

=== The Evil Plotter ===
The "evil plotter" woman is young and very beautiful, and she uses her feminine charm to trick the men into doing what she wants. She has an ulterior motive, which is on the opposite end of the spectrum from what the rest of the team is trying to accomplish. She is the character that the audience and the other characters despise by the end of the movie because she is devilishly smart and knows how to use her scientific knowledge and sexual prowess for evil. This character type was portrayed by Alison Doody as Dr. Elsa Schneider in Indiana Jones and the Last Crusade.

=== The Daughter/Assistant ===
This role of female scientist encompasses many feminine stereotypes portrayed in movies. In this role the woman is subordinate to her male counterpart, who is either her father or her lover. She is smart and capable, but her secondary role does not allow her to demonstrate her abilities. Flicker writes that when this woman plays the role of lover to the male scientist, "her work place is limited to the bed." She is only good for sexual satisfaction, not for the degree she earned. The assistant role is seen in the female Dr. Medford in the film Them!, as she is portrayed alongside an older gentleman of the same name.

=== The Lonely Heroine ===
This type of woman scientist is intelligent, attractive, and somewhat independent. Flicker says that she "has appropriated some male traits," such as losing herself in her work. She is both sexual and smart, and she manages to exhibit both qualities in the film. Despite this, she is still subordinate to the men on her team, and depends on them and their work to gain respect. She is the most progressive of the woman scientist types, but she lacks her own form of independence and still must rely on a sexual relationship with a man to be seen as someone. The "lonely heroine" type is best seen in Jodie Foster's portrayal of Elleonore Arroway in the film Contact.

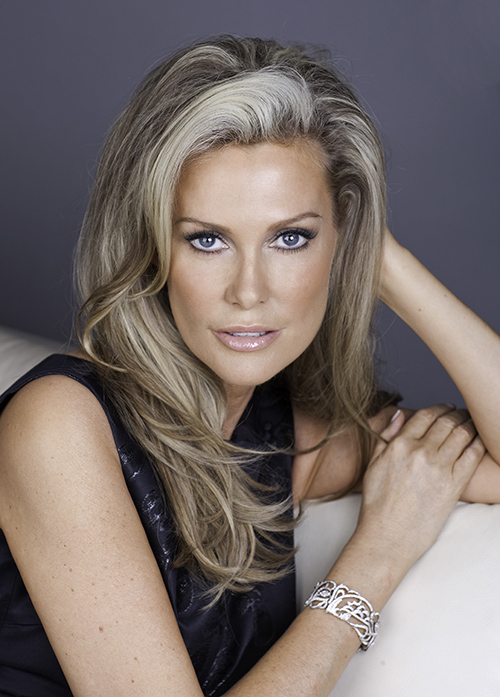
Alison Doody, who played Dr. Elsa Schneider in Indiana Jones and the Last Crusade

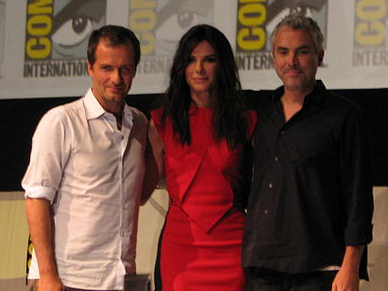
Sandra Bullock (center), with director Alfonso Cuarón (right), and producer David Heyman

== Objectification of women in film ==
Flicker argues that women are often pigeonholed into these six limiting roles when written in films. Each of these roles places the female scientist character on the sidelines, and does not allow her to be on the same level as her male counterpart(s). Although the women in these roles are educated, and often just as educated as the men on their team, they are used primarily as assistants and sexual characters. Producers strategically write women's roles for the male gaze, often making the female characters use their "weapons of a woman," such as sex appeal, to be attractive to male characters and viewers alike.

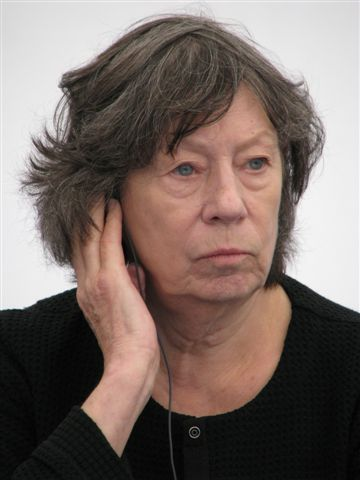
Prominent feminist film theorist Laura Mulvey

Feminist film theorist Laura Mulvey writes that in film, women are passive objects of the male gaze. Mulvey writes that movies fulfill "a primordial wish for pleasurable looking," and that male audiences are largely catered to in the film industry. In her analysis of film, she states that the lead woman in a film often falls in love with her male counterpart, and when she does, she only exists as a character to please him. Through the male character's ownership of the woman, the men in the audience find themselves owning her as well.

The male gaze is a significant aspect of traditional feminist film analysis and thus is an important factor to consider in relation to female scientists and how they are portrayed in films. Typically women are viewed as sexual objects for the pleasure of males who view these films. This has a direct effect on how people interpret women scientists and their role in movies. Instead of being portrayed as superheroes, they begin to obtain a reputation based on sexual appeal.

Considering superhero films, Amy Shackelford mentions how the male gaze is applied to sexualize the female character, further misinterpreting women in the media through visual depiction. Looking at these particular films, screenwriters have a difficult time accomplishing the task of writing female characters. Shackelford also states that it seems like the only way these screenwriters know how to portray female characters in superhero films power is to sexualize them.

Judith Mayne supports Laura Mulvey's view. She writes that "most feminist film theory and criticism of the last decade" has been in written in response to Mulvey's 1975 assessment, "Visual Pleasure and Narrative Cinema." She argues that understanding the often sexist portrayal of women in film requires "an understanding of patriarchy as oppressive and as vulnerable." Mayne goes deeper in her argument claiming that feminist film theory inspired feminist documentaries that are "aimed at rejecting stereotyped images of women." This criticism also opens the question about "the notion of woman as 'image.'".

Law professor Sarah Eschholz and her colleagues Jana Bufkin and Jenny Long write that in film, women are often young, and female characters are rarely played by middle aged or older women. Often the only role available to these women is that of the mother, who is not meant to be a leading character. They write that "females' primary societal value is based on physical appearance and youthful beauty." According to their assessment, men are valued at all ages, and arguably more so as they age and become wiser. Most women in film are 35 years old or younger, while their male costars are often older. Despite women in film having impressive credentials and extensive educations, they are often reduced to objects for looking, due to a reluctance to hire an older, less attractive woman for a major role.

In the traditional husband and wife family, women are often portrayed as the second in command. Their husbands take on the role of family head and get to maintain a bachelor level of freedom, which allows them to work and spend time out with the guys. Eschholz, Bufkin, and Long report on studies that show female characters are more likely to be married and have a family than male characters. Men have the freedom to work and be protagonists through their actions, while their wives or girlfriends are forced to take a back seat in the story to care for the family.

== Opposing views ==
Noël Carroll references Mulvey's pivotal paper on psychoanalysis and visual pleasure in his writing, and plays devil's advocate to her claim that women are the only subjects of gaze. Carroll acknowledges and agrees with Mulvey's assessment that women in film are strategically placed for the male gaze despite the role of their actual character. Carroll states, "Women in Hollywood film are staged and blocked for male erotic contemplation and pleasure." However, Carroll adds that men in films are also strategically placed for the purpose of pleasure. He cites such examples as Sylvester Stallone and Arnold Schwarzenegger, big bodybuilding actors "whose scenes are blocked and staged precisely to afford spectacles of bulging pectorals and other parts." Similarly to actresses, male actors are also heralded for their facial attractiveness and are sometimes lauded exclusively for being attractive. As an example, Carroll offers Leslie Howard, a male actor who appeared in Of Human Bondage and Gone With the Wind, who was highly successful in the industry despite being "staggeringly ineffectual." According to Carroll, being subject to the erotic gaze of the audience is not an exclusively female burden; rather, both sexes fall prey to Hollywood camera angles that best show off their bodies.

Kristin Thompson, an American film theorist, analyzes the film Laura. In her analysis, she claims that the main character, Laura, was written to embody the role of "passive visual object," which Mulvey and Flicker claim is an extremely prevalent role of women in film. In the film, the main protagonist spends much of the film admiring an idealised painting of Laura, rather than communicating with an independent human being. However, Thompson, like Carroll, does not believe that this passive role is limited to women in the industry. Thompson claims that Mulvey's assessment stating that women are used as objects and men cannot handle being the subject of gaze is "common but not universal" in the film industry. She claims that men are also presented in flashy ways in film, and gives the example of Howard Keel in the film Show Boat. Her analysis aligns with Carroll's conclusion that both sexes must be the subject of the audience's gaze, and that objectification is all-encompassing.

== Impact of film portrayals of women ==
Studies have shown that female scientists are either underrepresented or misrepresented as film characters. As Eva Flicker writes, film has a way of taking social realities and expressing certain images of women through media formats. Such media is then able to influence the audience by creating a mirror of metaphors, myths, opinions, and a social memory contributing to stereotypes.

The existence of gender-STEM stereotyping is not a new phenomenon. Such stereotyping has been shown to be prevalent among people in a broad range of ages and life stages, from early childhood to college. However, it has been demonstrated that increasing exposure to representations that break the stereotypes of men as the default in STEM can successfully begin to undermine these mental correlations and help to prevent perpetuation of these narratives. This is an example that can be explained by the social role theory of social psychology and the distinct role of culture.

== Impact of Television/ Film Crossover Representation ==
While most films are a one-off presentation of a story, TV shows which lead to a film can portray characters and ideas in a more long-term and rounded manner.

One example of this can be seen in the X-Files's Dana Scully. The Scully Effect is widely documented as having encouraged a large number of women to go into science. Running from 1993 to 2002, the weekly portrayal of a medical doctor carrying out investigations with the FBI, followed by her story on the big screen (The X-Files and The X-Files: I Want to Believe) has had a huge impact on science.

A much earlier example is that of Communications Officer Lt Nyota Uhura on Star Trek. As a woman of colour portraying a military linguist, cryptographer and mathematician, Uhura has had an unprecedented influence on women, and men, around the world.

== Meta Analysis ==
A 2007 meta-analysis by Jocelyn Steinke of Western Michigan University and colleagues looked at gender stereotyping by children who have been exposed to images of scientists through films, television shows, and books. One study examined elementary school students taking the Draw-a-Scientist-Test, or DAST. The results showed that out of more than 4,000 children who participated in the DAST, only 28 girls drew female scientists. Another study of 1,137 Korean students between the ages of eleven and fifteen found that 74% of them drew male scientists, while only 16% had depicted female scientists. Through the influence of mass media outlets, statistics from the National Science Foundation 2000 indicate that women make up only 19.4% of the STEM industry including science and mathematics. As a result, most children in the major developmental years are subjected to accepting traditional stereotypes of women being passive, emotional, physically weak and dependent, as depicted in films. The study posits that gender stereotypes can be the product of an individual's surrounding environment, which can influence how they view themselves and others around them.

As an increasing number of adolescents use social media platforms, the reinforcement of traditional cultural norms is at an all-time high. Even before young women reach adolescence, they may be exposed to social media perpetuating the stereotype of women as dependent, emotional and less capable beings.

An increasing interest in science in real-life and on-screen is linked. As Mae Jemison (a life-long Star Trek fan) became the first black woman to travel in space and the first real-life astronaut to appear on Star Trek, this link can be celebrated for changes it brings across society.
