= DAST =

DAST may refer to:

- Diethylaminosulfur trifluoride, an organosulfur compound
- Draw-a-Scientist Test, designed to investigate children's perceptions of the scientist
- Dynamic application security testing, in computing
- Mir Dast (1874–1945), an Indian Muslim soldier
- Dast, a horror short story by Indian writer Narayan Dharap
