= The Story of Star Wars =

1977 record album

Recording
- Genre: Audio drama
- Length: 48:41
- Label: 20th Century Fox
- Producers: Alan Livingston; George Lucas

The Story of Star Wars is a 1977 record album presenting an abridged version of the events depicted in the film Star Wars, using dialogue and sound effects from the original film. The recording was produced by George Lucas and Alan Livingston, and was narrated by Roscoe Lee Browne. The script was adapted by E. Jack Kaplan and Cheryl Gard-Wornson. The album was released on 20th Century Fox Records (T-550) and came with an illustrated 16-page souvenir photo book.

The original film became a hit in the days before home video, so for many fans at the time, this album was the closest to owning a copy of the film they could revisit whenever they wanted. The album was also released on compact cassette (6101B), 8-track tape (8-550), and 4-track reel-to-reel audio tape. It was a commercial success and achieved Gold Record status. The album was ultimately reissued by Walt Disney Studios (which would later acquire Lucasfilm in 2012) through its own label Buena Vista Records (62101) in 1983.

== Personnel ==
- Produced for records by George Lucas and Alan Livingston
- Narration by Roscoe Lee Browne
- Adapted by E. Jack Kaplan and Cheryl Gard-Wornson
- Associate Producer: Pat Glasser
- Edit and Sound Engineer: Rudy Hill
- Artwork: Joey Reynolds Supermarket
- Art direction: John Georgopoulos

== Track listing ==
Side one
No.	Title	Length
1.	"The Story of Star Wars (Part One)"	25:19

Side two
No.	Title	Length
2.	"The Story of Star Wars (Part Two)"	25:02
Total length:		48:41

== Foreign language versions ==
The Story of Star Wars record album was also recorded into versions in other languages.

The French language version, L'Historie de La Guerre des étoiles, was adapted by A. Bugle and L. Adès, featured the voices of Roger Carel, Philippe Dumat, Francis Lax, Dominique Maurin and Henri Virlogeux and was narrated by Dominique Paturel. The album was released in 1983 by Buena Vista Records (ST-3893 F) and distributed by Disques Adès. Like the English language version, the record came with a 24-page photo book with a complete transcript of the narration and dialogue.

The German language version, Krieg der Sterne (The Story of Star Wars), was adapted by Rolf Karrer-Kharberg with narration written by Peter Lach, featured the voices of Wilhelm Borchert, Joachim Tennstedt, Friedrich Schoenfelder, Wolfgang Pampel, Heinz Petruo, Hans-Georg Panczak and Susanna Bonaséwicz and was narrated by F. J. Steffens. This version was distributed in 1978 on LP (9199 535) by Fontana Records and cassette (7299 735) by Philips Records.

Two Spanish language versions of the album exist; the regular Spanish version, La Historia de La Guerra de las Galaxias, was narrated by José Catalá, and like the English language album, was released by 20th Century Fox Records (17.1325/8) and came with a souvenir photo book, while the Mexican Spanish version, Argumento Completo Narrado de La Guerra de las Galaxias, was narrated by León Canales.

The Japanese language version, スターウォーズストーリー日本語版 (The Story of Star Wars (Japanese Version)), was issued by 20th Century Fox Records on LP (FML-96) and cassette (AOF-5059), but the physical release for this version was manufactured and distributed by King Records. The album was narrated by Taichirō Hirokawa.

== Sequel albums ==
The Story of Star Wars record album was followed by two albums based on the sequels, both representing compressed versions of events from the films and released on LP record and cassette tape.

The album derived from The Empire Strikes Back was adapted by E. Jack Kaplan and Cheryl Gard-Wornson and was produced by Pat Glasser (for P. G. Productions) with narration provided by Malachi Throne. The Empire album was first issued by RSO Records (RS-1-3081) as The Empire Strikes Back: The Adventures of Luke Skywalker and was reissued in 1983 by Buena Vista Records, on LP (62102) and cassette (6102B), as The Story of Star Wars: The Empire Strikes Back. The reissue came with a 16-page souvenir photo book.

The abridged adaptation of Return of the Jedi was developed at Walt Disney Productions (which would later acquire Lucasfilm in 2012) and released through Buena Vista Records, on LP (62103) and cassette (6103B), as The Story of Star Wars: Return of the Jedi, the recording was produced by Jymm Magon and narration was done by Chuck Riley. Like the previous two albums before it, the Jedi album came with a 16-page souvenir photo book.

== See also ==
- Star Wars, a 1981 National Public Radio series that ran for 13 episodes.
- E.T. the Extra-Terrestrial, a 1982 record album that featured an abridged version of the events of the 1982 film.
