= Soviet Attitudes Toward Authority =

1951 book

Soviet Attitudes Toward Authority: An Interdisciplinary Approach to Problems of Soviet Character
- Title page for Soviet Attitudes Toward Authority: An Interdisciplinary Approach to Problems of Soviet Character (1955 edition)
- Author: Margaret Mead
- Language: English
- Subject: Soviet Union
- Publisher: RAND Corporation
- Publication date: 1951
- Publication place: United States
- Pages: 148

Soviet Attitudes Toward Authority: An Interdisciplinary Approach to Problems of Soviet Character is a 1951 nonfiction book written by the anthropologist Margaret Mead and eight other specialists. It is published by the RAND Corporation.

It is a preliminary report on approved and disapproved attitudes toward authority in the Soviet Union. In its last three pages, the book attempts to create a hypothesis on the Soviet Union in the next 5 to 10 years.

Meed posits that the traditional Russian character structure "developed individuals prone to extreme swings in mood from exhilaration to depression, hating confinement and authority, and yet feeling that strong external authority was necessary to keep their own violent impulses in check".

== Critical response ==
One reviewer stated, "This is a coldly objective, well-documented study. It is also remarkably boring. And it does little to indicate what makes the Soviet system of authority so attractive to some and so objectionable to others that they are willing to give their lives either to promote or to destroy it."
