= Margaret Mead =

American cultural anthropologist (1901–1978)

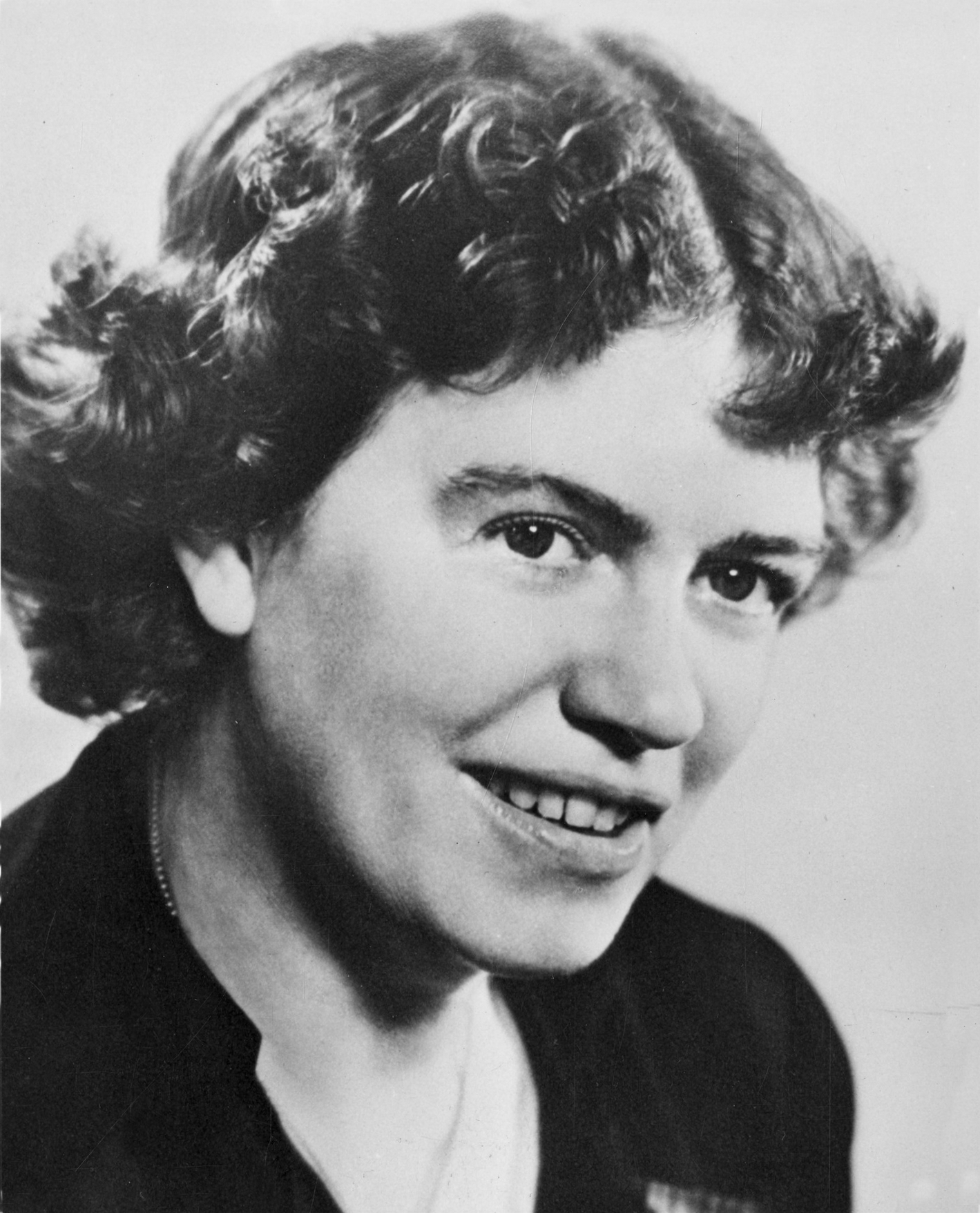
- Mead in 1948
- Born: December 16, 1901; Philadelphia, Pennsylvania, U.S.
- Died: November 15, 1978 (aged 76); New York City, U.S.
- Education: DePauw University; Barnard College (BA) Columbia University (MA, PhD)
- Occupation: Anthropologist
- Spouses: Luther Cressman (m. 1923; div. 1928) Reo Fortune (m. 1928; div. 1935) Gregory Bateson (m. 1936; div. 1950)
- Children: Mary Catherine Bateson
- Relatives: Jeremy Steig (nephew)
- Awards: Kalinga Prize (1970); Presidential Medal of Freedom (1979, posthumous)

Margaret Mead (December 16, 1901 – November 15, 1978) was an American cultural anthropologist, author and speaker, who appeared frequently in the mass media during the mid-twentieth century.

Mead's first ethnographic work, Coming of Age in Samoa (1928), addressed adolescence and sexuality and catapulted her to national visibility. Her book Sex and Temperament in Three Primitive Societies (1935), explored gender roles and personality based on fieldwork in Papua New Guinea. Mead also conducted fieldwork with the Omaha people; in Manus, Papua New Guinea; and in Bali. She wrote Keep Your Powder Dry, an ethnographic examination of American life, in the hopes of supporting mobilization for World War II. She coordinated two comparative studies on modern cultures in the 1950s, while focusing her own work on Russia. Her later work included returns to Papua New Guinea, Bali, and Samoa for longitudinal studies. She was curator of ethnology at the American Museum of Natural History from 1946 to 1969. Mead served as president of the American Association for the Advancement of Science in 1975.

According to anthropologist Paul Shankman, "Mead was anthropology's most significant public voice during the twentieth century." She is regarded as a founding figure in public anthropology and visual anthropology. Her ethnography of the South Pacific and Melanesia has been subject to vigorous academic debate. From the 1920s to the 1960s, her fieldwork was widely discussed in the press and she wrote a monthly column in Redbook magazine co-authored with partner Rhoda Métraux. Her reports detailing the attitudes towards sex in South Pacific and Southeast Asian traditional cultures influenced the 1960s sexual revolution. Mead's association with cultural relativism and the sexual revolution led to sharp criticism from conservatives.

== Early life and education ==
Margaret Mead, the first of five children, was born in Philadelphia but raised in nearby Doylestown, Pennsylvania. Her father, Edward Sherwood Mead, was a professor of finance at the Wharton School of the University of Pennsylvania, and her mother, Emily (née Fogg) Mead, was a sociologist who studied Italian immigrants. Her sister Katharine (1906–1907) died at the age of nine months. That was a traumatic event for Mead, who had named the girl, and thoughts of her lost sister permeated her daydreams for many years.

Her family moved frequently and so her early education was directed by her grandmother. From 1902-1912, they lived in Hammonton, New Jersey, where her mother conducted her dissertation research on Italian immigrants in the area. From 1912-1926, her family owned the Longland farm, and Margaret was enrolled at Buckingham Friends School in Lahaska, Pennsylvania. Born into a family of various religious outlooks, she searched for a form of religion that gave an expression of the faith with which she had been formally acquainted, Christianity. In doing so, she found the rituals of the Episcopal Church to fit the expression of religion she was seeking. Mead studied one year, 1919, at DePauw University, then transferred to Barnard College.

Mead earned her bachelor's degree from Barnard in 1923, began studying with professors Franz Boas and Ruth Benedict at Columbia University, and earned her master's degree in 1924. Mead set out in 1925 to do fieldwork in Samoa. In 1926, she joined the American Museum of Natural History, New York City, as assistant curator. She earned her Ph.D. from Columbia University in 1929.

== Anthropological work ==
=== Methods ===
As an ethnographer, Mead's primary research method was participant observation through living in communities for extended periods of time. Beginning with her first field study in Samoa, she often concentrated her research on childhood, adolescence, sexuality, and kinship. In examining these topics, Mead created multivocal ethnographies that considered the lives of women and men, girls and boys alongside one another.

During fieldwork with Gregory Bateson in Bali in the 1930s, she used still and motion photography extensively, creating one of the earliest film archives of anthropological research. Mead and Bateson's subsequent culture-at-a-distance work also involved studying films to characterize foreign cultures. These innovations led to her being called the "mother" of visual anthropology.

During World War II, Mead turned her attention to studying her own American culture and to conducting studies of national character, which she envisioned as being important both for the war effort and for an internationalist future after the war. She organized, along with Ruth Benedict until her death in 1948, the Columbia University project Research in Contemporary Culture. These studies involved reviewing cultural materials and interviewing nationals of the culture under study, methods more accessible under wartime conditions. The method and numerous studies conducted under it were published in The Study of Culture at a Distance (1953), edited by Mead and Rhoda Métraux.

Mead was also concerned with studying social change and modernization, particularly in the context of prior research. She conducted return field visits of her own and oriented new ethnographers in Bali, Manus, the Admiralty Islands, New Guinea, and Samoa.

=== Research fieldwork ===
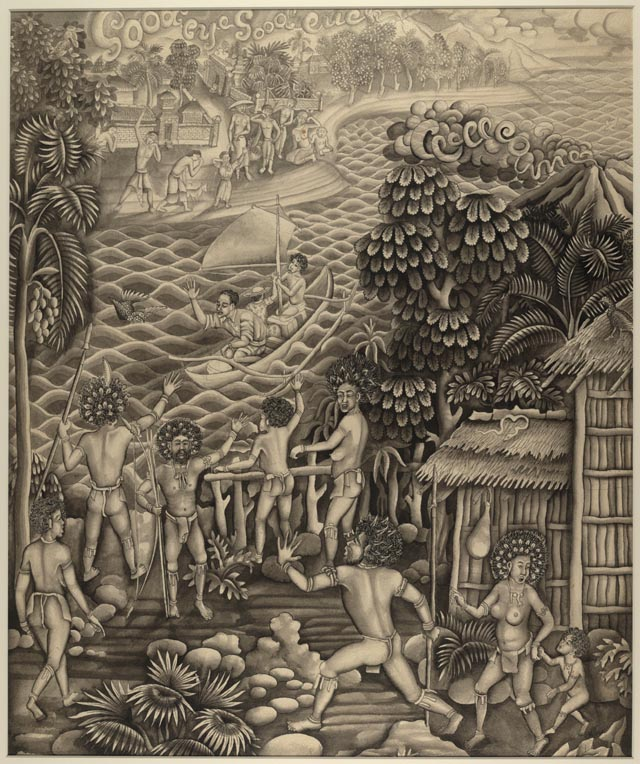
Ink on paper drawing by artist I Ketut Ngéndon depicting anthropologists Margaret Mead and Gregory Bateson leaving Bali and heading for Papua New Guinea

Margaret Mead Field Visits, 1925–1977
Year	Field Visit
1925-1926	American Samoa (study of adolescent girls)
1928-1929	Manus, Admiralty Islands (with Reo Fortune, study of young children)
1930	Omaha (Umonhon) Tribe, Nebraska (with Reo Fortune)
1931-1933	New Guinea (study of Arapesh, Biwat, and Chambri people)
1936-1939	Bali and New Guinea (study of Iatmul people with Gregory Bateson)
1953	Manus, Admiralty Islands (with Theodore and Lenora Schwartz)
1957-1958	Bali (with Ken Heyman)
1964-1965	Manus, Admiralty Islands
1967	Manus, Admiralty Islands; New Guinea
1971	Manus, Admiralty Islands; New Guinea and American Samoa
1973	Hoskins Bay, New Britain (study of Arapesh people)
1975	Manus, Admiralty Islands
1977	Bali

=== Samoa: Coming of Age in Samoa (1928) ===
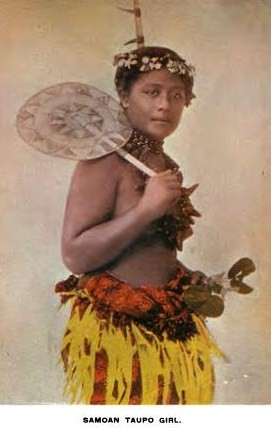
Samoan girl, c. 1896

Mead's first ethnographic work described the life of Samoan girls and women on the island of Taʻū in the Manu'a Archipelago of American Samoa in 1926. The book includes analyses of how children were raised and educated, household structure, sex relations, dance, development of personality, conflict, and how women matured into old age. Mead explicitly sought to contrast adolescence in Samoa with that in America, which she characterized as difficult, constrained, and awkward.

Coming of Age tackled the question of nature versus nurture, whether adolescence and its associated developments were a difficult biological transition for all humans or whether they were cultural processes shaped in particular societies. In her introduction, Mead notes that American and European psychologists, educators, and philosophers have argued that the turmoil of adolescence in their societies is driven by biology. Her book takes a skeptical approach to the idea that

The physical changes which are going on in the bodies of your boys and girls have their definite psychological accompaniments. You can no more evade one than you can the other your daughter's body changes from the body of a child to the body of a woman, so inevitably will her spirit change, and that stormily.

Mead instead believed childhood, adolescence, gender, and sex relations were largely driven by cultural practices and expressions. By conducting fieldwork in what she called a "simpler society" and among "primitive groups who have had thousands of years of historical development along completely different lines from our own," she sought to find a comparative case to answer the questions: "Are the disturbances which vex our adolescents due to the nature of adolescence itself or to the civilisation? Under different conditions does adolescence present a different picture?"

Much of Mead's text is devoted to describing the life course of Samoans, with a particular emphasis on girls and women. Mead stated that the community ignores both boys and girls until age 15 or 16, giving them little social standing but also effectively greater freedom. Mead also found that marriage is regarded as a social and economic arrangement in which wealth, rank, and job skills of the husband and wife are taken into consideration.

Aside from marriage, Mead identified two types of sex relations: love affairs among unmarried young people and adultery. Mead describes the psychology of the individual Samoan as being simpler, more honest, and less driven by sexual neuroses than the West. She describes Samoans as being much more comfortable with issues such as menstruation and more casual about non-monogamous sexual relations. (Note: Samoans rate romantic fidelity in terms of days or weeks at most, and are inclined to scoff at tales of life-long devotion. They greeted the story of Romeo and Juliet with incredulous contempts.) Mead described Samoan youth as often having free, experimental, and open sexual relationships, including homosexual relationships, which was at odds with mainstream American norms around sexuality. The exceptions to these practices include women married to chiefs and young women who hold the title of taupo, a ceremonial princess, whose virginity was required.

Derek Freeman, a New Zealand anthropologist, became the most prominent critic of Coming of Age in Samoa, publishing two books attacking her findings in 1983 and 1998. Freeman had lived in Samoa from 1940 to 1943, and studied missionary records from Samoa during his doctoral training at Cambridge. In 1965, he began fieldwork in Samoa, motivated in part by skepticism of Mead's research. He criticized Mead's work in a 1968 paper to the Australian Association of Social Anthropology, arguing that Mead had mischaracterized Samoa as a sexually liberated society when in fact it was characterized by sexual repression and violence and adolescent delinquency. Freeman pointed to police records and other historic data to show that Mead's claims about low levels of violent crime and sexual violence in Somoa were simply not true. Though many anthropologists rejected some of Freeman's harshest criticisms, the Mead–Freeman controversy greatly tarnished Mead's public image and played a part in debates about cultural relativism, multiculturalism, and nature and nurture.

=== Manus ===
In 1928–29, Mead and Fortune visited Manus (in the Admiralty Islands, now the northernmost province of Papua New Guinea) for six months, traveling there by boat from Rabaul. She describes her stay there extensively in her autobiography, and it is mentioned in her 1984 biography by Jane Howard. On Manus, she studied the Manus people of the south coast village of Peri on Shallalou Island. Her research resulted in Growing Up in New Guinea (1930) and a technical study titled, "Kinship in the Admiralty Islands" (1934); Fortune published Manus Religion (1935). Howard writes, "Over the next five decades Mead would come back oftener to Peri than to any other field site of her career.'

Mead wrote a study of social changes in Peri between her two field visits of 1928–29 and June to December 1953, published as New Lives for Old (1956). Mead saw her return visit as a chance to study the impact of technological change, including the replacement of traditional architecture with "American-style" housing, and social transformation. Between the two visits, there had been several major social changes. The people of Manus became Catholics around 1930. Next, the Admiralty and Solomon Islands were occupied by the Japanese and then made into a strategic location for the American military and over a million soldiers had deployed through them. Finally, Manus society was roiled by the Paliau Movement, which called for a New Way (Tok Pisin: Nufela Fasin), which repudiated many forms of traditional culture, innovated a new form of Christianity, and instituted village assemblies. The movement's leader, Paliau Moloat, advocated in 1953 for unity among villages and ethnic groups, working for village development rather than for Europeans, and eventual independence for Papua New Guinea. In New Lives for Old, Mead interpreted the movement's millenarian religious component, "The Noise" as a component of the society's modernization:

the movement led by the native leader Paliau, which attempted to understand and incorporate the values and institutions of the Western world, to build a real modern culture of its own, complete with democratic government, schools, clinic, universal suffrage, money, individual and community responsibility, was the stuff out of which abiding, steady social change comes. Counterpointed to this, facilitating and retarding, was a nativistic cult, a 'cargo cult' called in Manus The Noise, in which men shook like leaves in the grip of a religious revelation that promised them all the blessings of civilization, at once, without an effort on their part except the destruction of everything they still possessed.

Mead was joined by researchers Theodore and Lenora Schwartz, and Leonora Foerstel. Schwartz published his own analysis of the Paliau Movement in 1962, which Peter Worsley describes as much more perceptive than Mead's.

In 1970, National Educational Television produced a documentary in commemoration of the 40th anniversary of Mead's first expedition to New Guinea. Through the eyes of Mead on her final visit to the village of Peri, the film records how the role of the anthropologist has changed in the forty years since 1928.

==== Somatyping ====
Beginning with a village meeting she led in December 1953, Mead conducted studies of the physical body types (or "somatypes") of villagers, with the assistance of Theodore Schwartz and Foerstel in 1954 and of Schwartz and Barbara Heath in 1968. The studies required photographing villagers of all ages in the nude, and Foerstel records that "the villagers were told that an examination of their physical types would enhance human knowledge." In theory and in publications, the studies made use of Jim Tanner and W.H. Sheldon's notions of body types defined by endomorphy, mesomorphy, and ectomorphy. Foerstel, writing in the 1980s, regretted the lack of consent and intrusion involved in this research. She noted that consent was sought from Australian colonial authorities, but not the villagers themselves:

Although the Manus villagers were cooperative, their permission for the testing was not solicited. In retrospect, I am somewhat shocked at the submissive compliance with which the villagers accepted their intrusive anthropologists. If villagers complained, we certainly did not hear about it, and perhaps for that reason, we did not question our own behavior.

Writing in 1970, Mead stood by the utility of these studies: "In 1953, I could explain somatotype photography within the range of a medical understanding, and the study of change in general as 'United Nations business' where records of how they, the Manus, had accomplished a desired change would be useful to other developing peoples."

=== Omaha: The changing culture of an Indian tribe (1931) ===
Mead and her husband Reo Fortune conducted fieldwork among the Omaha people from June to October 1930. Fortune openly presented himself as a anthropological researcher, tracking the comparative question of why Omaha culture lacks the trance-based visions that are significant in surrounding cultures. Mead presented herself only as the wife of an anthropologist, while clandestinely gathering fieldnotes on the lives of Omaha women and girls. She described this method as necessary to access the information she gathered, and in turn claimed she had an ethical obligation to anonymize her uninformed research subjects.

In The changing culture of an Indian tribe, the Omaha are pseudonymized as "The Antlers." Mead's work was concerned with "culture change" under the influence of the United States, and her assessment of the process was overwhelmingly negative: her work refers to the Omaha as "a broken culture." Mead's work charted the impact of the Dawes Act, which subdivided Indian land into parcels that could be sold: "Since 1920, conditions have been getting steadily worse on the reservation. ... Each such sale makes one or more persons pensioners on their relatives and doubly impoverishes the tribe as a group. ... [T]he land, given to their grandfathers as a perpetual economic basis for their existence, is irretrievably lost and nothing remains in its place."

=== Sex and Temperament in Three Primitive Societies (1935) ===
Mead undertook fieldwork in the Sepik River watershed of New Guinea with her husband Reo Fortune from 1931 to 1933. The main result of her ethnographic fieldwork was Sex and Temperament in Three Primitive Societies. In the book, Mead profiled three New Guinea cultures with distinct gender systems, and explored the question of what happens when an individual's emotional disposition is at odds with society's gender expectations.

The focus of the book is temperament, that is patterns of personality and emotions, and "with the cultural assumptions that certain temperamental attitudes are 'naturally' masculine and others 'naturally' feminine." The three societies in question were the Mountain Arapesh people, the Mundugumor (or Biwat) people, and the Tchambuli (now spelled Chambri) people. Mead describes how "each tribe has certain definite attitudes towards temperament, a theory of what human beings, either men or women or both, are naturally like, a norm in terms of which to judge and condemn those individuals who deviate from it."

Mead concluded that:

If those temperamental attitudes which we have traditionally regarded as feminine—such as passivity, responsiveness, and a willingness to cherish children—can so easily be set up as the masculine pattern in one tribe, and in another be outlawed for the majority of the women as well as for the majority of men, we no longer have any basis for regarding such aspects of behavior as sex-linked.

The distinction between femininity and masculinity on the one hand, and biological sex on the other presaged the sex–gender distinction, which is at the core of the sociology of gender roles and a central concept in feminist thought.

The book is divided into four parts, covering "the Mountain-Dwelling Arapesh," "the River-Dwelling Mundugumor," and the "Lake-Dwelling Tchambuli," and finally in Part Four, analyzing the socialization into gendered temperament across these societies and in the West. Mead's characterizations of each of the three peoples has been subject to vigorous scholarly debate, including by her research collaborator and ex-husband Reo Fortune (on the Arapesh), Nancy McDowell (on the Mundugumor), and Deborah Gewertz and Frederick Errington (on the Tchambuli),

=== Bali ===
From 1936 to 1938, Mead and Gregory Bateson conducted fieldwork in Bali, mostly in the village of Bajoeng Gede. They also worked from a former Rajah's palace in Bangli, and from a custom-built "pavilion in the courtyard of a Buddhistic Brahman family in the village of Batoean." Balinese culture is heavily influenced by the external cultures of Indian Hinduism, China, and Java, but Mead and Bateson sought a field site that would give them access to the "cultural base upon which various intrusive elements had been progressively grafted over the centuries." Bajoeng Gede, which is located near Kintamani in Bangli District, seemed to them lacking in Hindu cultural imports, had only a handful of literate record keepers, and by elaborate Balinese standards, relatively simple ritual life. In Bangli, they were interested in the ruling caste and in Batoean, they researched both the Brahman family and the Brahman and casteless painters in an art school.

Trance and Dance in Bali, a 1951 documentary by Gregory Bateson and Margaret Mead

Mead and Bateson collaborated in extensive photographic documentation in Bali, with Mead writing simultaneous notes while Bateson operated the camera. They amassed 25,000 photographs and over 20,000 feet of film and completed seven short films including:

- Karba's First Years: A Study of Balinese Childhood, 1952, 20 minutes.
- A Balinese Family, 1951, 20 minutes.
- Trance and Dance in Bali, 1952, 22 minutes.
- Learning to Dance in Bali, 1978, 13 minutes.

Mead and Bateson published Balinese Character: A Photographic Analysis, which included 100 photographs, in 1942. Mead undertook a second analysis with Frances Cooke Macgregor, Grow and Culture: A Photographic Study of Balinese Childhood, published in 1951.

=== Other research areas ===
In 1926, there was much debate about race and intelligence. Mead felt the methodologies involved in the experimental psychology research supporting arguments of racial superiority in intelligence were substantially flawed. In "The Methodology of Racial Testing: Its Significance for Sociology," Mead proposes that there are three problems with testing for racial differences in intelligence. First, there are concerns with the ability to validly equate one's test score with what Mead refers to as racial admixture or how much Negro or Indian blood an individual possesses. She also considers whether that information is relevant when interpreting IQ scores. Mead remarks that a genealogical method could be considered valid if it could be "subjected to extensive verification." In addition, the experiment would need a steady control group to establish whether racial admixture was actually affecting intelligence scores. Next, Mead argues that it is difficult to measure the effect that social status has on the results of a person's intelligence test. She meant that environment (family structure, socioeconomic status, and exposure to language, etc.) has too much influence on an individual to attribute inferior scores solely to a physical characteristic such as race. Then, Mead adds that language barriers sometimes create the biggest problem of all. Similarly, Stephen J. Gould finds three main problems with intelligence testing in his 1981 book The Mismeasure of Man that relate to Mead's view of the problem of determining whether there are racial differences in intelligence.

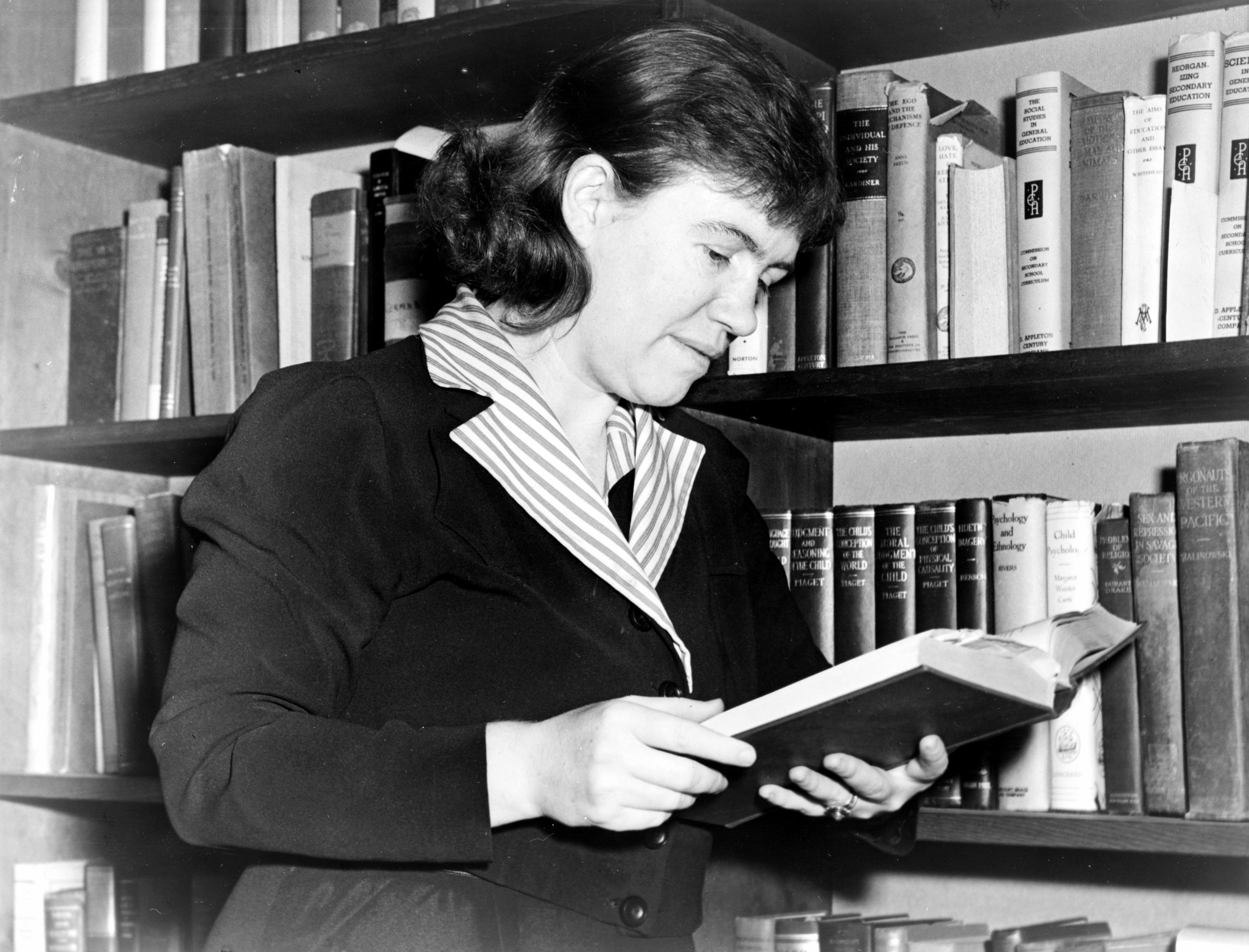
Mead, c. 1950

Mead has been credited with persuading the American Jewish Committee to sponsor a project to study European Jewish villages, shtetls, in which a team of researchers would conduct mass interviews with Jewish immigrants living in New York City. The resulting book, widely cited for decades, allegedly created the Jewish mother stereotype, a mother intensely loving but controlling to the point of smothering and engendering guilt in her children through the suffering she professes to undertake for their sakes.

Mead worked for the RAND Corporation, a US military-funded private research organization, from 1948 to 1950 to study Russian culture and attitudes toward authority.

As an Anglican Christian, Mead played a considerable part in the drafting of the 1979 American Episcopal Book of Common Prayer.

== Personal life ==
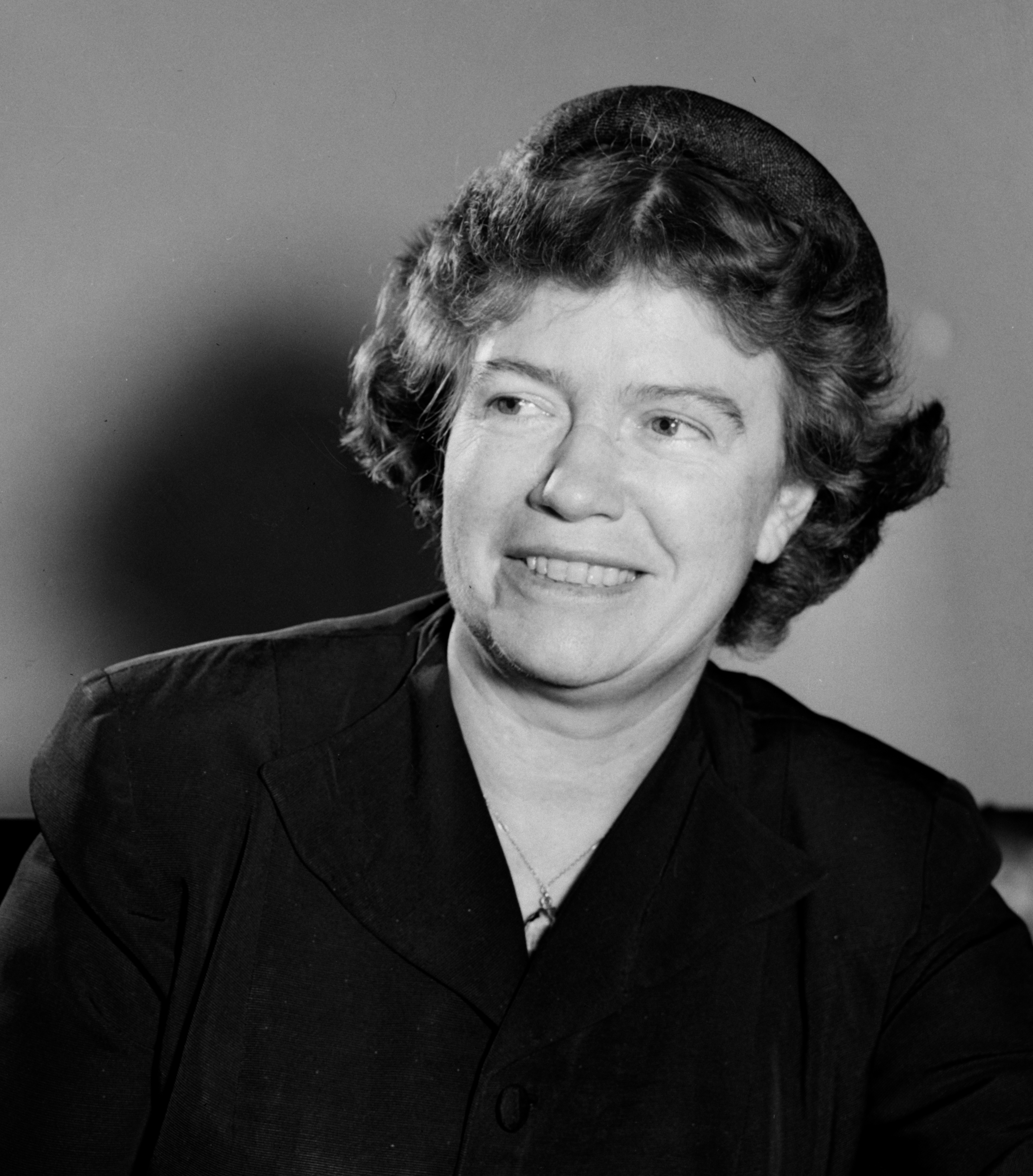
Mead in Australia in September 1951

Mead was married to men three times and had significant romantic relationships outside of marriage, including with at least two women. After a six-year engagement, she married her first husband (1923–1928), Luther Cressman, an American theology student who later became an anthropologist. Mead dismissively characterized her union with her first husband as "my student marriage" in her 1972 autobiography Blackberry Winter, a sobriquet with which Cressman took vigorous issue.

Before departing for Samoa in 1925, Mead had a short affair with the linguist Edward Sapir. However, Sapir's conservative stances about marriage and women's roles were unacceptable to Mead, and as Mead left to do field work in Samoa, they separated permanently. Mead received news of Sapir's remarriage while she was living in Samoa. There, she later burned their correspondence on a beach.

During the same period, she began a romantic relationship with her instructor Ruth Benedict, a close friend of Sapir. In her memoir about her parents, With a Daughter's Eye, Mary Catherine Bateson strongly implies that the relationship between Benedict and Mead was partly sexual. In her biography of the two women, Lois Banner writes that Mead and Benedict had become lovers by late 1924 and that Benedict then "characterize[d] Mead [as] her daughter and protégée in anthropology, her partner, lover, and best friend." Mead and Benedict lived together for two months in summer 1928 and shared a Washington, DC, house during World War II as Mead commuted from her home in New York City to work for the federal government.

On her 1926 return voyage from fieldwork in Samoa, Mead met Reo Fortune, a New Zealander headed to Cambridge, England, to study psychology. At Cambridge University, Fortune soon switched to the discipline of anthropology under the mentorship of Colonel T.C. Hodson and completed a thesis, "On Imitative Magic" in 1927. Fortune conducted fieldwork in the D'Entrecasteaux Archipelago from October 1927 to , eventually resulting in Sorcerers of Dobu (1932). They were married in New Zealand in 1928, after Mead's divorce from Cressman. Mead and Fortune conducted joint fieldwork with the Omaha people in Nebraska and in New Guinea, where Mead was collecting data for Sex and Temperament in Three Primitive Societies. It was during this fieldwork that the two of them met Gregory Bateson. Unlike her other husbands, Fortune was decidedly monogamous in his orientation and troubled by Mead's other romantic connections. Mead described their marriage as troubled by Fortune's professional competitiveness, his "puritanical jealousy," and ultimately his physical violence against her.

Mead's third and longest-lasting marriage (1936–1950) was to the British anthropologist Gregory Bateson with whom she had a daughter, Mary Catherine Bateson, who would also become an anthropologist. She readily acknowledged that Bateson was the husband she loved the most. She was devastated when he left her and remained his loving friend ever afterward. She kept his photograph by her bedside wherever she traveled, including beside her hospital deathbed.

She spent her last years in a close personal and professional collaboration with the anthropologist Rhoda Metraux. Métraux had worked with Mead when the latter headed the National Research Council's Committee on Food Habits during World War II. By 1947 or 1948, they were romantically involved. Mead and Métraux shared homes—in Greenwich Village (1955–66) and on Central Park West (1966–78)—until Mead's death. Letters between the two published in 2006 with the permission of Mead's daughter clearly express a romantic relationship.

Privately and at times in her scholarship, Mead espoused free-love, drawing inspiration from Havelock Ellis's The Art of Love and Edward Carpenter's Love's Coming of Age. Her marriage to Cressman involved agreement to divorce on demand and the freedom for both parties to have affairs. As quoted by Sapir, Mead stated, "It would be an insult to both me and my husband to expect marital fidelity on the part of either of us." In 1926, Mead described her "belief that one can love several people and that demonstrative affection has its place in different types of relationship." Her marriage to Bateson was likewise an open one. Biographer Jane Howard attributes to a close friend of Mead the observation that Mead "fell in love with women's souls and men's bodies. She was spiritually homosexual, psychologically bisexual, and physically heterosexual. She had affairs with both men and women—though never with two men or two women at the same time."

Mead never openly identified herself as lesbian or bisexual. In correspondence, Mead described her self as a "mixed type" with attractions to both men and women, and in a 1928 letter to Benedict described seeking a "perfect balance" between her "two loves" to Benedict and her husband Fortune. In the public conversation that became known as "A Rap on Race", Mead rejected James Baldwin's invitation to describe herself as "an exile" like him, a suggestion that biographer Benjamin Breen and scholar Jean Walton have described as a chance to reveal her bisexuality. In her writings, she proposed that it is to be expected that an individual's sexual orientation may evolve throughout life. Speaking at a public conference in 1974, Mead suggested that youthful homosexuality, followed by heterosexuality in middle adulthood, and then by late life homosexuality would be ideal for society. In a Redbook column, co-authored with Metraux, Mead wrote, "What is new is not bisexuality, but rather the widening of our awareness and acceptance of human capacities for sexual love."

Mead's pediatrician was Benjamin Spock, whose subsequent writings on child rearing incorporated some of Mead's own practices and beliefs acquired from her ethnological field observations which she shared with him; in particular, breastfeeding on the baby's demand, rather than by a schedule.

Mead's sister Elizabeth (1909–1983), an artist and teacher, married the cartoonist William Steig, and her sister Priscilla (1911–1959) married the author Leo Rosten. Mead's brother Richard was a professor. Mead was also the aunt of Jeremy Steig.

== Career and later life ==
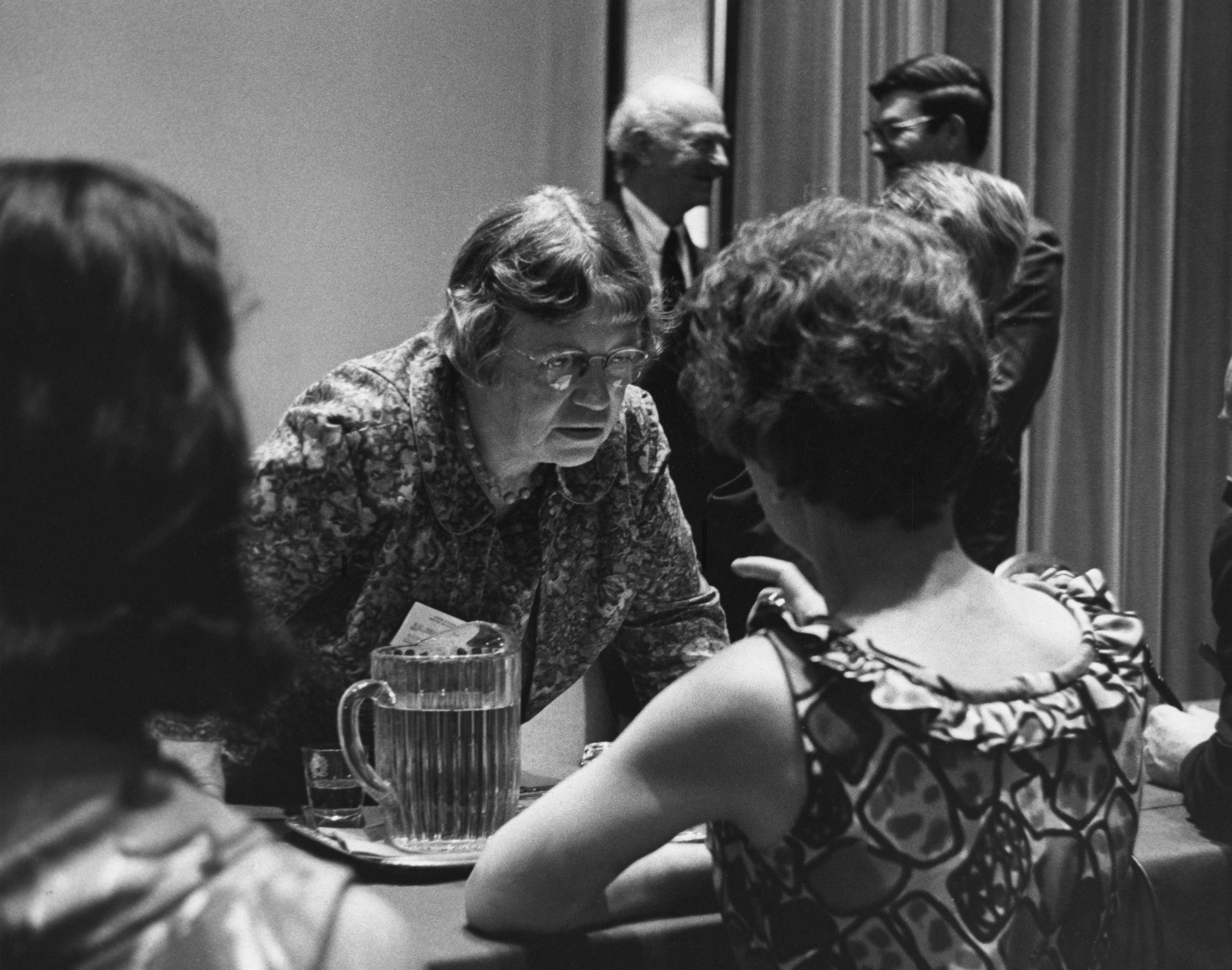
Mead at New York Academy of Sciences, 1968

During World War II, Mead along with other social scientists like Gregory Bateson and Ruth Benedict, took on several different responsibilities. In 1940, Mead joined the non-governmental Committee for National Morale. In 1941, she published an essay in Applied Anthropology, which offered strategies to help produce propaganda with the intent of raising national morale. From 1942, Mead served as the executive director of the Committee on Food Habits of the National Research Council, which served to gather data on American citizens' ability to get food and their overall diet during the war. During the war, Mead also served on the Council on Intercultural Relations (later, the Institute for Intercultural Studies (IIS)), whose primary objective was to research the "national character" of the Axis powers to try to foster peace between the two sides after the war. In summer 1943, she traveled to Britain on a speaking tour on American culture funded by the Office of War Information. Drawing on experiences on this tour, she wrote and published The American Troops and the British Community, in part to explain American "courtship rituals" and dating to a British public increasingly affected by millions of American soldiers. She also wrote a manual on using cultural knowledge in overseas undercover operations for the Army Specialized Training Program. Mead continued to establish a public voice, with her writing appearing in Vogue, Mademoiselle, and the New York Times.

In 1948, Mead was quoted in the News Chronicle as supporting the deployment of Iban mercenaries to Malaysia during the Malayan Emergency, arguing that using Ibans (Dyaks) who enjoyed headhunting was no worse than deploying white troops who had been taught that killing was wrong.

She was curator of ethnology at the American Museum of Natural History from 1946 to 1969. She was elected a Fellow of the American Academy of Arts and Sciences in 1948, the United States National Academy of Sciences in 1975, and the American Philosophical Society in 1977. She taught at The New School and Columbia University, where she was an adjunct professor from 1954 to 1978 a professor of anthropology and chair of the Division of Social Sciences at Fordham University's Lincoln Center campus from 1968 to 1970, founding their anthropology department. In 1970, she joined the faculty of the University of Rhode Island as a Distinguished Professor of Sociology and Anthropology.

Following Ruth Benedict's example, Mead focused her research on problems of child rearing, personality, and culture. She served as president of the Society for Applied Anthropology in 1950 and of the American Anthropological Association in 1960. In the mid-1960s, Mead joined forces with the communications theorist Rudolf Modley in jointly establishing an organization called Glyphs Inc., whose goal was to create a universal graphic symbol language to be understood by any members of culture, no matter how "primitive." In the 1960s, Mead served as the Vice President of the New York Academy of Sciences. She held various positions in the American Association for the Advancement of Science, notably president in 1975 and chair of the executive committee of the board of directors in 1976. She was a recognizable figure in academia and usually wore a distinctive cape and carried a walking stick.

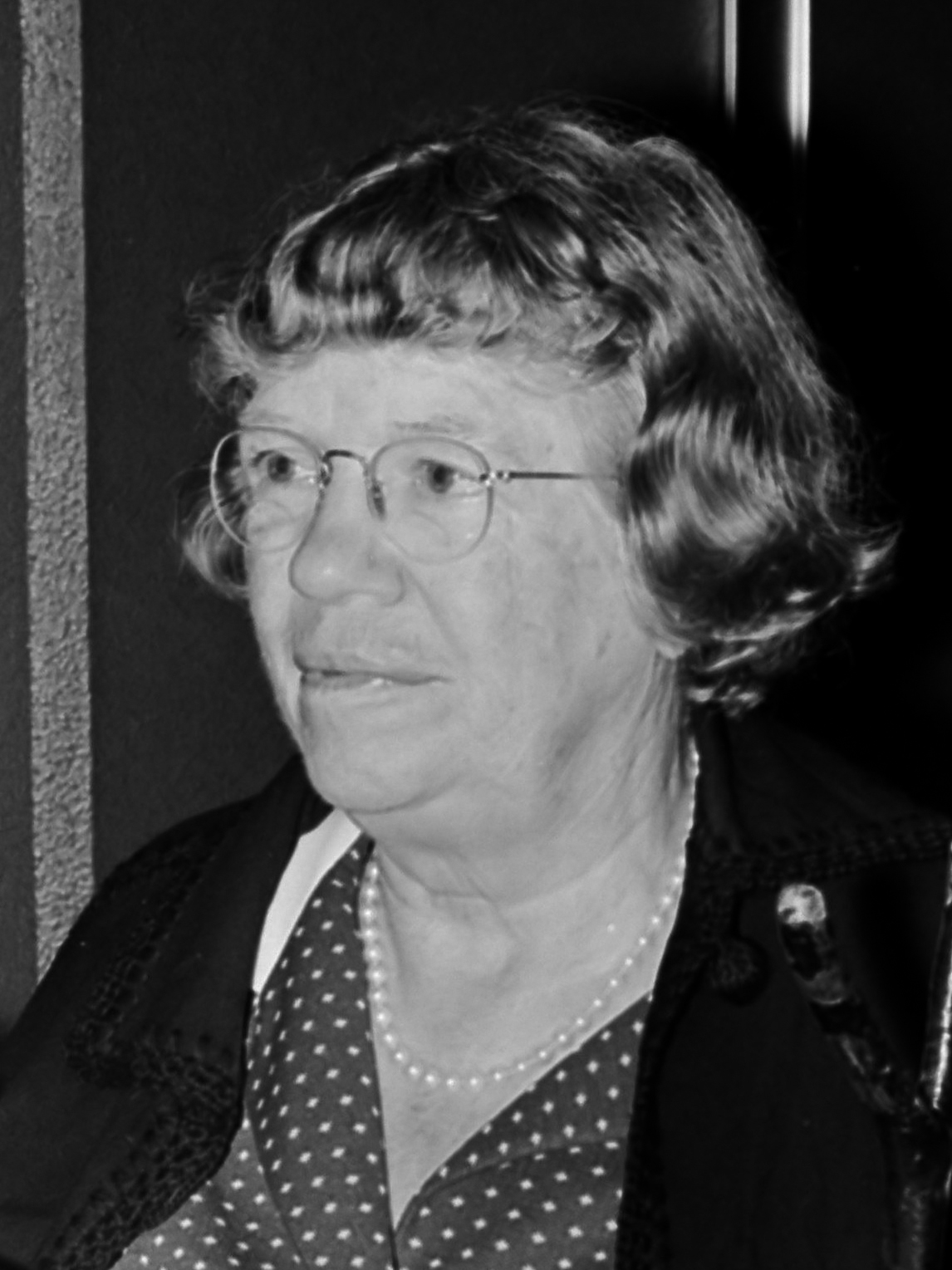
Margaret Mead (1972)

Mead was a key participant in the Macy conferences on cybernetics and an editor of their proceedings. Mead's address to the inaugural conference of the American Society for Cybernetics was instrumental in the development of second-order cybernetics.

Mead was featured on two record albums published by Folkways Records. The first, released in 1959, An Interview With Margaret Mead, explored the topics of morals and anthropology. In 1971, she was included in a compilation of talks by prominent women, But the Women Rose, Vol. 2: Voices of Women in American History.

She is credited with the pluralization of the term "semiotics".

In later life, Mead was a mentor to many young anthropologists and sociologists, including Jean Houston, author Gail Sheehy, John Langston Gwaltney, Roger Sandall, filmmaker Timothy Asch, and anthropologist Susan C. Scrimshaw, who later received the 1985 Margaret Mead Award for her research on cultural factors affecting public health delivery.

In 1972, Mead was one of the two rapporteurs from NGOs to the UN Conference on the Human Environment. In 1976, she was a key participant at UN Habitat I, the first UN forum on human settlements.

Mead died of pancreatic cancer on November 15, 1978, and is buried at Trinity Episcopal Church Cemetery, Buckingham, Pennsylvania.

== Legacy ==
=== Posthumous honors ===
The American Museum of Natural History hosts an annual Margaret Mead Film Festival, featuring documentary films, including but not limited to those about scientific and ethnographic topics. It was first held in 1976, in celebration of Mead's 75th birthday. As of 2025, it was described as the "longest running documentary showcase in the United States."

Margaret Mead is widely known for the quote,"Never doubt that a small group of thoughtful, committed citizens can change the world; indeed, it's the only thing that ever has."

In 1976, Mead was inducted into the National Women's Hall of Fame.

On January 19, 1979, U.S. President Jimmy Carter announced that he was awarding the Presidential Medal of Freedom posthumously to Mead. UN Ambassador Andrew Young presented the award to Mead's daughter at a special program honoring her contributions that was sponsored by the American Museum of Natural History, where she spent many years of her career. The citation read:

Margaret Mead was both a student of civilization and an exemplar of it. To a public of millions, she brought the central insight of cultural anthropology: that varying cultural patterns express an underlying human unity. She mastered her discipline, but she also transcended it. Intrepid, independent, plain spoken, fearless, she remains a model for the young and a teacher from whom all may learn.

The Margaret Mead Award is awarded in her honor jointly by the Society for Applied Anthropology and the American Anthropological Association, for significant works in communicating anthropology to the general public.

In addition, there are several schools named after Mead in the United States: a junior high school in Elk Grove Village, Illinois, an elementary school in Sammamish, Washington and another in Sheepshead Bay, Brooklyn, New York.

=== Biographies ===
Margaret Mead's life is the subject of numerous books including:

- Charles King's Gods of the Upper Air profiles the work and impact of multiple members of the Franz Boas circle of anthropologists.
- Mary Catherine Bateson's memoir of her parents, With a Daughter's Eye: A Memoir of Margaret Mead and Gregory Bateson
- Paul Shankman's The Trashing of Margaret Mead, on the posthumous Freeman controversy over her Samoa fieldwork.
- Elesha Coffman's Margaret Mead: A Twentieth-Century Faith, which explores Mead's Christianity. Mead had once wrote, "Shorn of all the things in which I can't believe—and don't want to—an omnipotent God, immortality, and original sin—Christianity is still the most beautiful thing I know, and the fact that Jesus lived the most satisfactory justification of life."
- Benjamin Breen's Tripping on Utopia: Margaret Mead, the Cold War, and the Troubled Birth of Psychedelic Science on Mead and Bateson's intersections with both early experiments in psychedelic use and covert experimentation organized by the US government.
- Deborah Blum's Coming of Age: The Sexual Awakening of Margaret Mead, covering Mead's education at Barnard/Columbia, her fieldwork in Samoa, and summer in Europe, and relationships with Cressman, Benedict, Sapir, and Fortune from 1921 to 1926.

Mead's life is also discussed in these scholarly works:

- Jean Walton's Fair Sex, Savage Dreams: Race, Psychoanalysis, Sexual Difference devotes its last two chapters to Mead, with a lengthy interpretation of her conversation with James Baldwin in A Rap on Race.
- Nancy Lutkehaus's Margaret Mead: The Making of an American Icon, which intertwines her look at Mead with "the study of fame … as a particular social practice" and of "the meanings associated with her that transcend or go beyond Mead."

== Publications ==
Note: See also Margaret Mead: The Complete Bibliography 1925–1975, Joan Gordan, ed., The Hague: Mouton.

=== As a sole author ===
- Coming of Age in Samoa (1928)
- Growing Up in New Guinea (1930)
- The Changing Culture of an Indian Tribe (1932)
- Sex and Temperament in Three Primitive Societies (1935)
- And Keep Your Powder Dry: An Anthropologist Looks at America (1942)
- Male and Female (1949)
- New Lives for Old: Cultural Transformation in Manus, 1928–1953 (1956)
- People and Places (1959; a book for young readers)
- Continuities in Cultural Evolution (1964)
- Culture and Commitment (1970)
- The Mountain Arapesh: Stream of Events in Alitoa (1971)
- Blackberry Winter: My Earlier Years (1972; autobiography)

=== As editor or coauthor ===
- Balinese Character: A Photographic Analysis, with Gregory Bateson, 1942, New York Academy of Sciences.
- Soviet Attitudes Toward Authority (1951)
- Cultural Patterns and Technical Change, editor (1953)
- Primitive Heritage: An Anthropological Anthology, edited with Nicholas Calas (1953)
- An Anthropologist at Work, editor (1959, reprinted 1966; a volume of Ruth Benedict's writings)
- The Study of Culture at a Distance, edited with Rhoda Metraux, 1953
- Themes in French Culture, with Rhoda Metraux, 1954
- The Wagon and the Star: A Study of American Community Initiative co-authored with Muriel Whitbeck Brown, 1966
- A Rap on Race, with James Baldwin, 1971
- A Way of Seeing, with Rhoda Metraux, 1975

== See also ==
- Ray Birdwhistell
- Macy Conferences
- Elsie Clews Parsons
- Zora Neale Hurston
- 75½ Bedford St

== Sources ==
- Acciaioli, Gregory, ed. (1983). "Fact and Context in Ethnography: The Samoa Controversy (special edition)". Canberra Anthropology. 6 (1): 1–97. ISSN 0314-9099.
- Appell, George (1984). "Freeman's Refutation of Mead's Coming of Age in Samoa: The Implications for Anthropological Inquiry". Eastern Anthropology. 37: 183–214.
- Bateson, Mary Catherine. (1984) With a Daughter's Eye: A Memoir of Margaret Mead and Gregory Bateson, New York: William Morrow. ISBN 978-0-688-03962-2
- Brady, Ivan (1991). "The Samoa Reader: Last Word or Lost Horizon?" (PDF). Current Anthropology. 32 (4): 263–282. doi:10.1086/203989. JSTOR 2743829. S2CID 146338555. Archived from the original (PDF) on October 21, 2013.
- Caffey, Margaret M., and Patricia A. Francis, eds. (2006). To Cherish the Life of the World: Selected Letters of Margaret Mead. New York: Basic Books.
- Caton, Hiram, ed. (1990) The Samoa Reader: Anthropologists Take Stock, University Press of America. ISBN 978-0-8191-7720-9
- Feinberg, Richard (1988). "Margaret Mead and Samoa: Coming of Age in Fact and Fiction". American Anthropologist. 90 (3): 656–663. doi:10.1525/aa.1988.90.3.02a00080.
- Foerstel, Leonora, and Angela Gilliam, eds. (1992). Confronting the Margaret Mead Legacy: Scholarship, Empire and the South Pacific. Philadelphia: Temple University Press.
- Freeman, Derek. (1983) Margaret Mead and Samoa, Cambridge, MA: Harvard University Press. ISBN 978-0-674-54830-5
- Freeman, Derek (1999). The Fateful Hoaxing of Margaret Mead: A Historical Analysis of Her Samoan Research. Boulder, CO: Westview Press. ISBN 978-0-8133-3693-0. Archived from the original on November 6, 2018 – via Questia.
- Goldfrank, Esther Schiff (1983). "Another View. Margaret and Me". Ethnohistory. 30 (1): 1–14. doi:10.2307/481499. JSTOR 481499.
- Holmes, Lowell D. (1987). Quest for the Real Samoa: the Mead/Freeman Controversy and Beyond. South Hadley, MA: Bergin and Garvey.
- Howard, Jane. (1984). Margaret Mead: A Life, New York: Simon and Schuster.
- Keeley, Lawrence (1996). War Before Civilization: the Myth of the Peaceful Savage (Oxford University Press). ISBN 978-0-19-511912-1
- Lapsley, Hilary. (1999). Margaret Mead and Ruth Benedict: The Kinship of Women. University of Massachusetts Press. ISBN 978-1-55849-181-6
- Leacock, Eleanor (1988). "Anthropologists in Search of a Culture: Margaret Mead, Derek Freeman and All the Rest of Us". Central Issues in Anthropology. 8 (1): 3–20. doi:10.1525/cia.1988.8.1.3.
- Levy, Robert (1984). "Mead, Freeman, and Samoa: The Problem of Seeing Things as They Are". Ethos. 12: 85–92. doi:10.1525/eth.1984.12.1.02a00060.
- Lutkehaus, Nancy C. (2008). Margaret Mead: The Making of an American Icon. Princeton: Princeton University Press. ISBN 978-0-691-00941-4
- Mageo, Jeannette (1988). "Malosi: A Psychological Exploration of Mead's and Freeman's Work and of Samoan Aggression". Pacific Studies. 11 (2): 25–65.
- Mandler, Peter (2013). Return from the Natives: How Margaret Mead Won the Second World War and Lost the Cold War. New Haven, CT: Yale University Press.
- Marshall, Mac (1993). "The Wizard from Oz Meets the Wicked Witch of the East: Freeman, Mead, and Ethnographic Authority". American Ethnologist. 20 (3): 604–617. doi:10.1525/ae.1993.20.3.02a00080.
- Mead, Margaret (1972). Blackberry Winter: My Earlier Years. New York: William Morrow. ISBN 978-0-688-00051-6.
- Mead, Margaret. 1977. The Future as Frame for the Present. Audio recording of a lecture delivered July 11, 1977.
- Metraux, Rhoda (1980). "Margaret Mead. A Biographical Sketch". American Anthropologist. 82 (2): 262–269. doi:10.1525/aa.1980.82.2.02a00010. JSTOR 675870.
- Nardi, Bonnie; Mead, Margaret; Freeman, Derek (1984). "The Height of Her Powers: Margaret Mead's Samoa". Feminist Studies. 10 (2): 323–337. doi:10.2307/3177870. hdl:2027/spo.0499697.0010.211. JSTOR 3177870.
- Moore, Jerry D. (2004). Visions of Culture: An Introduction to Anthropological Theories and Theorists. Rowman Altamira. p. 105. ISBN 978-0-7591-0411-2.
- Patience, Allan; Josephy Smith (1987). "Derek Freeman in Samoa: The Making and Unmaking of a Biobehavioral Myth". American Anthropologist. 88: 157–162. doi:10.1525/aa.1986.88.1.02a00160. S2CID 162320330.
- Paxman, David B. (1988). "Freeman, Mead, and the Eighteenth-Century Controversy over Polynesian Society". Pacific Studies. 11 (3): 1–19.
- Pinker, Steven A. (1997). How the Mind Works. ISBN 978-0-393-04535-2
- Sandall, Roger. (2001) The Culture Cult: Designer Tribalism and Other Essays. ISBN 978-0-8133-3863-7
- Scheper-Hughes, Nancy (1984). "The Margaret Mead Controversy: Culture, Biology, and Anthropological Inquiry". Human Organization. 43 (1): 85–93. doi:10.17730/humo.43.1.362253166r6173m4 (inactive December 12, 2025).
- Shankman, Paul (1996). "The History of Samoan Sexual Conduct and the Mead-Freeman Controversy". American Anthropologist. 98 (3): 555–567. doi:10.1525/aa.1996.98.3.02a00090.
- Shankman, Paul (2009). The Trashing of Margaret Mead: Anatomy of an Anthropological Controversy. University of Wisconsin Press. ISBN 978-0-299-23454-6.
- Shankman, Paul (2021). Margaret Mead. New York: Berghahn. ISBN 978-1-80073-141-7.
- Shore, Brad. (1982) Sala'ilua: A Samoan Mystery. New York: Columbia University Press.
- Stassinos, Elizabeth (1998). "Response to Visweswaren, 'Race and the culture of anthropology'". American Anthropologist. 100 (4): 981–983. doi:10.1525/aa.1998.100.4.981.
- Stassinos, Elizabeth (2009). "An Early Case of Personality: Ruth Benedict's Autobiographical Fragment and the Case of the Biblical "Boaz"". Histories of Anthropology Annual. 5: 28–51. doi:10.1353/haa.0.0063. ISSN 1557-637X. S2CID 144198222.
- Virginia, Mary E. (2003). Benedict, Ruth (1887–1948). DISCovering U.S. History online edition, Detroit: Gale.
- Young, R. E.; S. Juan (1985). "Freeman's Margaret Mead Myth: The Ideological Virginity of Anthropologists". Australian and New Zealand Journal of Sociology. 21 (1): 64–81. doi:10.1177/144078338502100104. S2CID 143970272.
