= Rhoda Métraux =

Rhoda Bubendey Métraux (18 October 1914, New York City – 26 November 2003, Barton, Vermont) was a prominent cultural anthropologist whose specialities were psychological anthropology and cross-cultural studies. She conducted ethnographic fieldwork in Haiti, Mexico, Argentina, Monteserrat, and Papua New Guinea, and was a prominent figure in "culture at a distance" studies of Germany, France, and Mexico, using literary and visual sources to write anthropological interpretations of culture. Topics of her research included "cultural imagery, national character, culture and psychotherapy, personality and culture, childhood, aging, culture change, [and] deviance." She was the co-author of Margaret Mead's regular writing in Redbook magazine, but this writing appeared under Mead's name until it was compiled in book form in 1970.

She collaborated with Alfred Métraux on joint studies of Haitian voodoo. She also studied the Iatmul people of the middle Sepik River in Papua New Guinea and made three fieldwork trips to Tambunum village of 6-7 months each in 1967-1968, 1971, and 1972-1973 that focused on music. During one of her studies, Métraux administered the Lowenfeld Mosaic Test in Tambunum, developed by a Margaret Lowenfeld. Additionally, Métraux did fieldwork in Mexico, Argentina, and Montserrat in the West Indies and enrolled at Yale University to study for her doctorate under the tutelage of Bronisław Malinowski. During World War II, Métraux headed the section on German morale for the US Office of Strategic Services (OSS).

Métraux was also an important professional and personal partner of Margaret Mead (1901–1978). Together with Mead, she wrote several books and many articles on major issues from the 1950s to the late 1970s. As a contributing editor to Redbook magazine for well over a decade, both of them wrote many articles on contemporary issues, which largely appeared under Mead's name, that later formed the basis of a number of books, including A Way of Seeing. Mead and Métraux were a close-knit professional team although Mead was the intellectual force and gained the most public renown. Métraux tended to serve as the editor of many of Mead's publications. Both had been married, widowed at a young age and had a child. "Their status as mothers and ex-wives offered them a gentile facade behind which to conceal what may also have been a sexual relationship."

They shared a house in Greenwich Village in New York City from 1955 to 1966 and an apartment on Central Park West from 1966 until Mead's death in 1978.

Métraux's papers are deposited in the Manuscript Division of the Library of Congress.

== Selected works ==
Sole author

- 1943, Qualitative Attitude Analysis: A Technique for the Study of Verbal Behavior. National Research Council Bulletin #108. Pp. 86-94. Washington, DC: National Academy of the Sciences.
- 1952, Some Aspects of Hierarchical Structure in Haiti. In Acculturation in the Americas. Sol Tax, ed. Pp. 185-194. Chicago: University of Chicago Press.
- 1952, Affiliations through Work in Marbial, Haiti. Primitive Man 25:1-22.
- 1955, Parents and Children: An Analysis of Contemporary German Child-Care and Youth-Guidance Literature. In Childhood in Contemporary Cultures. Margaret Mead and Martha Wolfenstein, eds. Pp. 204-228. Chicago: University of Chicago Press.
- 1955, A Portrait of the Family in German Juvenile Fiction. In Childhood in Contemporary Cultures. Margaret Mead and Martha Wolfenstein, eds. Pp. 253-276. Chicago: University of Chicago Press.
- 1955, The Consequences of Wrongdoing: An Analysis of Story Completions by German Children. In Childhood in Contemporary Cultures. Margaret Mead and Martha Wolfenstein, eds Pp. 306-323. Chicago: University of Chicago Press.
- 1976, "Eidos and Change: Continuity in Process, Discontinuity in Product." In Socialization in Cultural Communication, T. Schwartz, ed. pp. 201 16. Berkeley: University of California Press.
- 1978, *"Aristocracy and Meritocracy: Leadership among the Eastern Iatmul." Anthropological Quarterly 51 (1978) 47 58.
- 1990, "Music in Tambunum." In Sepik Heritage: Tradition and Change in Papua New Guinea, N. Lutkehaus et al., eds. pp. 523 34. Durham: Carolina Academic Press.

Works with Margaret Mead

- 1953, The Study of Culture at a Distance (eds.). Chicago: University of Chicago Press.
- 1954, Themes in French Culture: A Preface to a Study of French Community. Stanford: Stanford University Press.
- 1970, A Way of Seeing. New York: McCall.

Works with others

- 1957 Normal and Deviant Behavior in a Peasant Community: Montserrat, B.W.I. American Journal of Orthopsychiatry 27:167-184.
- Abel, Theodora, and Rhoda Métraux, 1959, Sex Differences in a Negro Peasant Community, Montserrat, B.W.I. Journal of Projective Techniques 23:127-133.
- Abel, Theodora, Rhoda Métraux, and Samuel Roll, 1987, Psychotherapy and Culture. Rev. and expanded ed. Albuquerque: University of New Mexico Press.
