= Growing Up in New Guinea =

1930 book by Margaret Mead

Growing Up In New Guinea
- First edition
- Author: Margaret Mead
- Language: English
- Publisher: Blue Ribbon Books
- Publication date: 1930
- Publication place: United States
- Pages: 372

Growing Up in New Guinea is a 1930 publication by Margaret Mead. The book is about her encounters with the indigenous people of the Manus Province of Papua New Guinea before they had been changed by missionaries and other western influences. She compares their views on family, marriage, sex, child-rearing, and religious beliefs to those of westerners.

The book has been rereleased several times since its original release under different publishers.
