= A Rap on Race =

Book by Margaret Mead and James Baldwin

- First edition
- Author: James Baldwin, Margaret Mead
- Language: English
- Publisher: J. B. Lippincott
- Publication date: 1971
- Publication place: United States
- Media type: Print

A Rap on Race is a 1971 non-fiction book co-authored by the writer and social critic James Baldwin and the anthropologist Margaret Mead. It consists of transcripts of conversations held between the pair in August 1970.

== Summary ==
Baldwin and Mead intertwine discussions on "identity, power and privilege, race and gender, beauty, religion, justice, and the relationship between the intellect and the imagination." They talk about "New Guinea, South Africa, Women's Lib, the South, slavery, Christianity, their early childhood upbringings, Israel, the Arabs, the bomb, Paris, Istanbul, the English language, Huey Newton, John Wayne, the black bourgeoisie, Baldwin's 2-year-old grandnephew and Professor Mead's daughter."

== Literary significance and criticism ==
The book was dismissed as "the same old bilge you've heard from the fellow on the next stool to you in the saloon" by a reviewer at The New York Times when it was first published.

In 2015, writer Maria Popova called the book "a remarkable and prescient piece of the cultural record" and "a bittersweet testament to one of the recurring themes in their dialogue — our tendency to sideline the past as impertinent to the present, only to rediscover how central it is in understanding the driving forces of our world and harnessing them toward a better future."
