= Annie Cordy =

Belgian actress and singer (1928–2020)

Baroness Annie Cordy
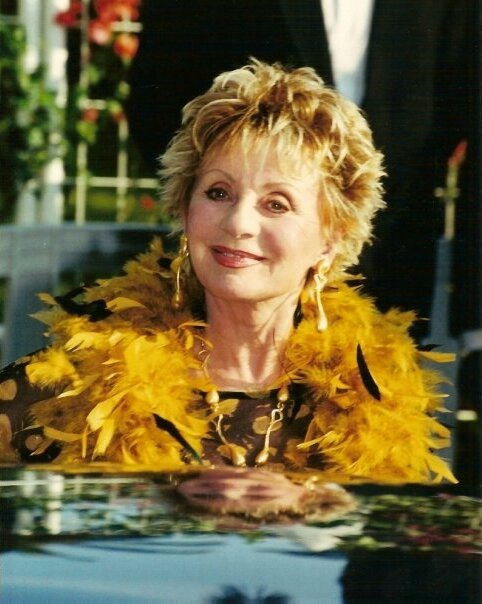
- Annie Cordy in 2001.
- Born: Léonie Cooreman; 16 June 1928; Laeken, Belgium
- Died: 4 September 2020 (aged 92); Vallauris, France
- Occupations: Actress; comedian; dancer; singer
- Years active: 1948–2020

Léonie Juliana, Baroness Cooreman (16 June 1928 – 4 September 2020), best known by her stage name Annie Cordy, was a Belgian singer and actress. She appeared in more than 50 films from 1954 and staged many memorable appearances at Bruno Coquatrix' famous Paris Olympia. Her version of "La Ballade de Davy Crockett" was number 1 in the charts for five weeks in France in August 1956. She was born in Laeken, Belgium, where in 2004, King Albert II of Belgium bestowed upon her the title of Baroness in recognition for her life's achievements.

== Early life ==
Cordy was born in the Brussels suburb of Laken, Belgium, the daughter of Maria de Leeuw and Jan Cornelius Cooreman. She had a brother, Louis, and a sister, Jeanne.

At the age of eight, her mother enrolled her in a dance class. She learned piano and music theory, while pursuing her studies, and participated in charity galas. Between the dance numbers, she sang the hits of the day. Artistic director of Le Lido encouraged her to leave Brussels, her hometown, and Annie Cordy arrived in Paris on 1 May 1950, to be hired as a lead dancer.

== 1952–1960 ==
Cordy recorded her first songs in 1952 ("Les Trois Bandits de Napoli", "Quand c'est aux autos de passer", "La bourrée d'Auvergne montagnarde") and made her debut in the musical, "La Route fleurie", alongside Georges Guétary and Bourvil. This lasted until 1955.

Then she made her film debut in 1953 when she appeared as herself in Boum sur Paris, next to Jacques Pills and Armand Bernard. That same year, she had her first hit record with "Bonbons, caramels, esquimaux, chocolats" or "Léon".

In 1954 she starred in April Fools' Day as Charlotte Dupuy, alongside her friend Bourvil, Louis de Funès, Denise Grey, and Maurice Biraud. The film was a big success with almost three million ticket sales. She also played Madame Langlois in Sacha Guitry's Royal Affairs in Versailles, with Michel Auclair, Jean-Pierre Aumont, Jean-Louis Barrault, Bourvil, Gino Cervi, Claudette Colbert, Nicole Courcel, Daniel Gélin, Jean Marais, Gisèle Pascal, Édith Piaf, Gérard Philipe, Micheline Presle, Tino Rossi, Orson Welles, and Nicole Maurey. The film was the #1 movie in France in 1954. It is still one of the 100 most successful films at the French box office of all time, the 89th highest grossing title.

In 1955 her song "Fleur de Papillon" became a hit. She also starred in two motion pictures. First, Hello Smile ! directed by Claude Sautet, with Henri Salvador, Louis de Funès, Darry Cowl and Jean Carmet and an Italian comedy, Beautiful but Dangerous, in which she just made a short appearance.

In 1956 she starred as Cri-Cri in Le Chanteur de Mexico, directed by Richard Pottier, with Luis Mariano, Bourvil, and Fernando Rey. The film was again a big success, with almost 5,000,000 tickets sold, and it was #5 at the box office for 1956 and #247 of all time in France.
At the same time she had a hit on the song charts with the French version of The Ballad of Davy Crockett, which stayed at number 1 for 5 weeks in France in August 1956.

In 1957 she played Titine in a West German remake of Victor and Victoria, directed by Karl Anton. That same year, she starred in her second musical, "Tête de linotte" with Jean Richard which lasted until 1960.

In 1958 she had other musical hits, such as "Hello le soleil brille" from the movie The Bridge on the River Kwai or "Docteur miracle". She returned to Tabarin, where she played Mimi under the direction of Richard Pottier for the second time. This was the leading role, and she starred alongside Michel Piccoli, Sylvia Lopez, Mischa Auer, Germaine Damar, Jean Lefebvre, and Isabelle Corey.

In 1959 she had several musical successes, including her version of "Petite Fleur", "Salade de fruits" or "Cigarettes, Whisky et P'tites Pépées" from the movie with the same name. She starred in this movie, with Pierre Mondy, Nadine de Rothschild, Jean Carmet, Jean Richard, and Franco Interlenghi.

In 1960 she played in Robert Vernay's "Tête folle, alongside Jean Richard.

== 1961–1970 ==
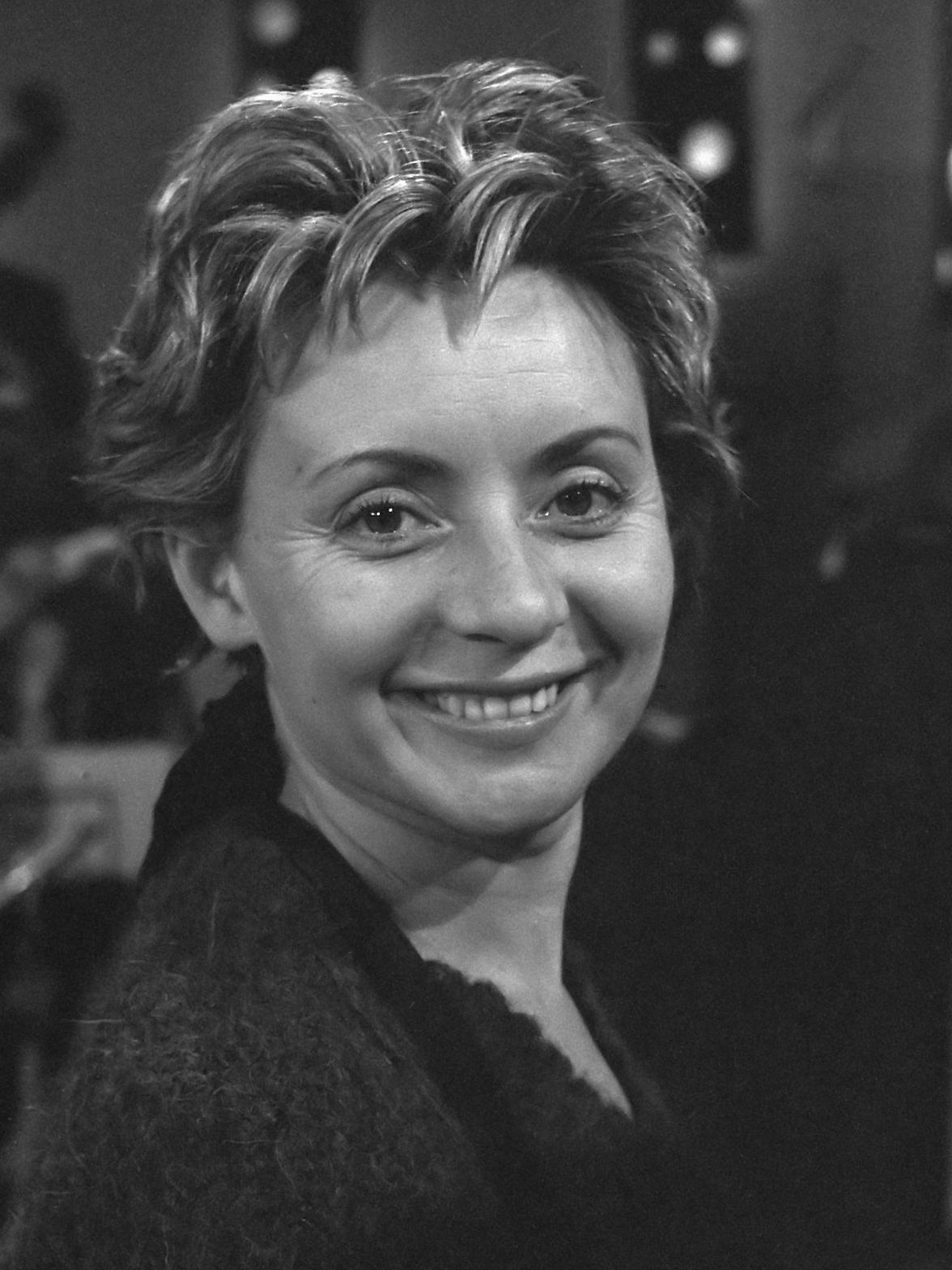
Annie Cordy in 1961

From 1961 to 1964 Cordy starred in her third musical, opposite Luis Mariano, named "Visa pour l'amour" featuring the hit "Visa pour l'amour".

In 1964 she sang the hit song "Six Roses".

From 1965 to 1967, she had the leading female part in "Ouah ! Ouah !", another musical with Bourvil. This musical featured the hit "Le p'tit coup de chance".
At the same time, back in cinema, she played Lily in Ces dames s'en mêlent, directed by Raoul André, with Eddie Constantine and Nino Ferrer. She also made a cameo in "L'or du duc" directed by Jacques Baratier, with Claude Rich, Danielle Darrieux, Elsa Martinelli, Pierre Brasseur, Jean Richard, and Charles Trenet.

In 1967, she played Maryse in "Ces messieurs de la famille", directed by Raoul André, with Francis Blanche, Michel Serrault, Darry Cowl, Jean Poiret, Jean Yanne, Michel Galabru, and Eddie Constantine.

In 1968 she starred in "Pic et Pioche", a musical with her friend Darry Cowl.

In 1969 she played Mme Marthe in "Le bourgeois gentil mec". It was the third time that she was directed by Raoul André, and the movie also stars Jean Lefebvre, Darry Cowl, Francis Blanche, and Bella Darvi.

The 1970 year was very successful for Cordy: she worked for the fourth time with Raoul André in the movie "Ces messieurs de la gâchette", a sequel of "Ces messieurs de la famille". She signed on for her role as Maryse, and the movie also featured, Francis Blanche, Jean Poiret, Michel Serrault, Darry Cowl, Micheline Dax, and Patrice Laffont.
She also played for René Clément, the role of Juliette in Rider on the Rain, alongside Marlène Jobert, Charles Bronson, Jill Ireland, and Gabriele Tinti. The movie was a big success: it was the #3 movie at the box-office in 1970, in France.
Also that year, she was directed by Claude Chabrol as Mme. Pinelli in The Breach. She starred alongside Stéphane Audran, Jean-Pierre Cassel, Michel Bouquet and Jean Carmet.
On top of her success in cinema, she also had a musical hit, "Le Chouchou de mon Coeur"

== 1971–1980 ==
In 1971, she played Nelly in Le Chat, directed by Pierre Granier-Deferre. The film also starred Jean Gabin and Simone Signoret, and was very well received, with more than one million tickets sold. She also started a new musical, "Indien vaut mieux que deux tu l'auras", where she starred with Pierre Doris.

In 1972, she starred in the titular role of the French version of Hello, Dolly!. She also played Brigitte in "Les galets d'Étretat". The movie is directed by Sergio Gobbi and starred Virna Lisi. Then, she played Andrée in "Les portes de feu", alongside Emmanuelle Riva and Jacques Balutin.

In 1973, she played Nina in Tre per una grande rapina, with Michel Constantin and Adolfo Celi. She also played in "La dernière bourrée à Paris", in which she worked for the fifth time with the director Raoul André and starred alongside Francis Blanche, Roger Coggio, Micheline Dax, Michel Galabru, Marion Game, and Tony Kendall. She played in "Elle court, elle court la banlieue" directed by Gérard Pirès and starring Marthe Keller, Jacques Higelin, Robert Castel, Ginette Leclerc, Claude Piéplu, Alice Sapritch, Victor Lanoux, Daniel Prévost, Coluche, Diane Kurys, and Miou-Miou. The film was a success with more than a million and a half tickets sold.

In 1974, she released La bonne du curé. This song became a classic and is one of her greatest successes with more than two million sales worldwide. At the same time, she continued to make movies like "Les gaspards", directed by Pierre Tchernia and starring Michel Serrault, Philippe Noiret, Michel Galabru, Charles Denner, Gérard Depardieu, Chantal Goya, Roger Carel, Daniel Ivernel, Jean Carmet, and Gérard Hernandez. She also played Pupa in the Italian movie Commissariato di notturna, directed by Guido Leoni and starring Rosanna Schiaffino, Gastone Moschin, George Ardisson, Emma Danieli, Giacomo Furia, Gisela Hahn, Leopoldo Trieste, Maurice Ronet, Luciano Salce, Carlo Giuffrè, Aldo Bufi Landi, Jean Lefebvre, Michele Gammino, Roger Coggio, Nerina Montagnani, Lorenzo Piani, Luciano Rossi, Bruno Scipioni, and Alfredo Varelli.

In 1975, she starred in the leading role of Souvenir of Gibraltar, directed by Henri Xhonneux, also starring Eddie Constantine. In addition she played Isabelle's mother in "Isabelle devant le désir", starring Jean Rochefort, Anicée Alvina, and Mathieu Carrière. This same year, she also had several musical hits : "Ya kasiti", "Jane la tarzane", and one of her most famous hits, "Frida Oum Papa".

In 1976, she returned to musicals in a production named "Nini la chance". She had the lead role in what turned out to be a huge success. This musical produced a hit for Cordy with song with the musical's title for its name, Nini la Chance. Outside of Nini, Cordy, had other hits this same year with "La Bébête", "Dis pourquoi tu me bats Léon", and "Ca ira mieux demain", which became a cult favourite. She starred in High Street, a movie directed by André Ernotte in which she had the leading part. In this film she played alongside Mort Shuman and Elliot Tiber.

In 1977, she played the Baronne Jacinthe de la Tronchembiais, in the first and only movie directed by Guy Lux, Drôles de zèbres. The movie also starred Sim, Alice Sapritch, Patrick Préjean, Raymond Bussières, Katia Tchenko, Léon Zitrone, Petula Clark, Coluche, and Claude François. The director and writer Michel Audiard said about Cordy that he was sorry she had to sing crappy songs, because she did an impressive duet with Bourvil, he thought her a wonderful blues singer and a great actress and she deserved to sing a way better song.

In 1978, she released another musical hit which became a classic, "Qui qu'en veut". This same year, she made her first television movie. First, she played in "Le bel indifférent" from Jean Cocteau's play, starring alongside Alain Delon. Then, she played ina television adaptation of Molière's The Miser. In this staging she played Frosine, alongside Henri Virlojeux and Paul Préboist.

In 1980, she had several musical successes, including; "Senorita Raspa", "La Coupe à Ratcha", "L'Artiste", and "Ma plus jolie chanson", but, her most successful title was "Tata Yoyo" which became another of her songs to develop a cult following.

== 1981–1990 ==
In 1981, she played Mme Hortense in the TV Movie written by Didier Decoin, "Les fiançailles de feu", alongside Pierre Malet and Paul Le Person. She also played the leading role in the TV Movie "Madame Sans-Gêne", an adaptation of Victorien Sardou's play, in which she appeared with Raoul Billerey. This same year she made her stage drama debut with the same play, "Madame Sans-Gêne".

In 1982, she's apoeared in the final musical in which she had the leading part, "Envoyez la musique". This same year on Television, she had her own TV Series, "Madame S.O.S.", it lasted one season. She played alongside Jean-Pierre Darras and Jeanne Herviale. The series's soundtrack, "Si j'étais le soleil", was sung by Cordy. She had also another musical success with "Nini Pompon".

In 1983, after six years of absence from the cinema, she returned with Le Braconnier de Dieu, directed by Jean-Pierre Darras, in which she played the leading female part. The movie also starred Pierre Mondy, Jean Lefebvre, Michel Galabru, Daniel Ceccaldi, Catherine Allégret, Rosy Varte, Odette Laure, Marthe Mercadier, Paul Préboist, and Roger Pierre. Meanwhile, Cordy experienced yet another musical success with the song "Le rock à Médor".

In 1985, she had another musical hit which became a cult favorite, Cho Ka Ka O.

In 1986, she appeared principally in Theater, with three plays in one year. First as Madame de Sévigné, in the play of the same name, in which she played the center role. Then, she played in "La Mienne s'appelait Régine" at the Théâtre de l'Œuvre. And finally, she played in "Merci Apolline", an original play.

In 1987, she resumed her role in the classic play "Madame Sans-Gene", that she had already played in 1981, on stage and in a TV Movie.

In 1989, she appeared in one episode of the French television Series, "Le bonheur d'en face", in which she played Irène Lecoin, in an episode directed by Teff Erhat. She also starred in the play "Mademoiselle Plume", in the leading role.

In 1990, she returned to cinema after a seven year break with the movie "Impasse de la vignette". In this film she played alongside; Paul Crauchet, Jean-Paul Comart, and Jean-Yves Berteloot. Her performance was praised by the critics and she won the Best Actress Award at the "Festivals de Digne". This same year, she had the leading role in the television Series "Orages d'été", in which she appeared during nine episodes, next to Gérard Klein, Claire Nebout, Jacques Dufilho, Pierre Vaneck, and Patachou. She also appeared on stage with the play "Sacrée Gladys", in which she had the leading role, next to Jacques Balutin.

== 1991–2000 ==
While Cordy continued to give concerts and musical compilations were released with her past albums, she was more present on television as an actress.

After a two-year break, she was back in 1993, when she appeared in the TV Series "Inspecteur Médeuze", next to Francis Perrin, Christophe Bourseiller, Jacques Seiler, and Mouss Diouf.

1994, was a big year for her. First, she starred in the movie La Vengeance d'une blonde, directed by Jeannot Szwarc, and with Christian Clavier, Marie-Anne Chazel, Clémentine Célarié, Thierry Lhermitte, Marc de Jonge, Philippe Khorsand, Angelo Infanti, and Urbain Cancelier. It was a big success with more than two million tickets sales at the box office. It was the fourth most successful French film of the year 1994 in France, behind An indian in the city, Léon: The Professional, and La Cité de la peur. She played Bertoune, the central character, in the TV Movie "La fille du roi", which also stars Raoul Billerey. This same year, she appeared in two plays. First, "Six heures au plus tard" with Xavier Percy and then "La Célestine" with Gérard Chambre. In both plays, she played the lead character.

In 1995, she played in her first Short film, "Vroum-vroum", written by Eduardo Manet, in which she starred next to Michael Lonsdale, Claire Nebout, and Jean-Paul Comart. She played in one episode of the TV Series "Baldi", next to her friend Charles Aznavour. She also had the leading role in the TV Movie "Fanny se fait un sang d'encre". She also sang for the French soundtrack of Pocahontas, named "Ecoute ton coeur".

In 1996, she played in a Short called "Moi j'aime Albert", alongside André Pousse. She also played Hélène in an episode of "Le refuge", starring Maxime Leroux and direct by Alain Schwartzstein.

In 1997, she played in three TV Movies. First, "Le diable en sabots" from a novel by Claude Seignolle, in which she played Marie Fer, alongside Patrick Préjean. Then, she played the leading role in "Une mère comme on n'en fait plus", with Nathalie Boutefeu and Cécile Vassort. Finally, she played Solange Serpette in "Sans cérémonie", directed by Michel Lang, written by Claude d'Anna, and also starring Charles Aznavour and Caroline Vasicek.

In 1998, to mark her 50-year career, she gave a concert at the Olympia. Her friends Georges Moustaki, Guy Béart, Nicoletta, Benjamin Castaldi, Sim, Claude Piéplu, Michel Leeb, Laurent Gerra, Didier Gustin, and many others were present at the event.

In 1999, she played in the Short "Un Noël de chien", written and directed by Nadine Monfils, and also starring Jean-Claude Dreyfus.

In 2000, she appeared in a second episode of the TV Series "Baldi", in which she'd already played in 1995, still next to her friend Charles Aznavour. She was also back on stage with a play written by William Shakespeare : "Les Joyeuses Commères de Windsor" (The Merry Wives of Windsor). She acted in this play with Patrick Préjean. She has also participated in the series of concerts organized by Les Enfoirés, where shared the song "Une belle histoire" with Alain Souchon and Francis Cabrel.

== 2001–2020 ==
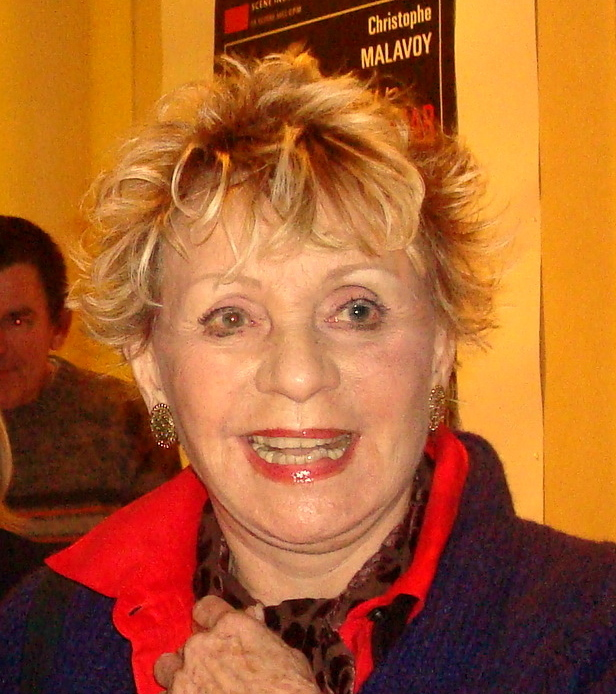
Annie Cordy in 2009

In 2001, she starred in the TV Movie "La tortue", with Pascale Arbillot.

In 2002, she starred in two TV Movies. First, "Les rebelles de Moissac", with Françoise Bertin and Maurice Chevit, and then, "Passage du bac", with Charles Aznavour, Alexis Tomassian, Bernard Blancan, and Urbain Cancelier.

In 2003, Annie played Lucette, the central character in an episode of "Fabien Cosma", with Louis-Karim Nébati and Gérard Hernandez.

In 2004, she played in the Short film "Zartmo". She was also back in the motion picture "Madame Édouard", after ten years of having not appeared in any film. "Madame Édouard" also starred Michel Blanc, Didier Bourdon, Dominique Lavanant, Josiane Balasko, Rufus, Andréa Ferréol, and Bouli Lanners. For her role in "Les Femmes de Cristal", she received the Woman Crystal Award in the category "Cinema and Theatre".

In 2005, she appeared in an episode of "Le tuteur", with Tony D'Amario.

In 2006, Cordy played Rose, the leading female character in the movie "Le Dernier des fous". The movie is based on the novel "The Last of The Crazy People" written by Timothy Findley. She was in the movie with Dominique Reymond. She also starred in "C'est beau une ville la nuit", directed by Richard Bohringer, and also featuring; Romane Bohringer, Robinson Stévenin, Luc Thuillier, Jacques Spiesser, Farid Chopel, Daniel Duval, Annie Girardot, Sonia Rolland, Christian Morin, and Paul Personne. She's also appeared on stage in "Lily & Lily", a play in which she had the leading part, with Christian Morin and Firmine Richard. She was also the narrator for the documentary, "Moi, Belgique" on RTBF, in which she related the history of her country, Belgium.

In 2008, she played Mme Graindorge in Disco, Fabien Onteniente's movie starring Emmanuelle Béart, Gérard Depardieu, Samuel Le Bihan, Isabelle Nanty, Chloé Lambert, Marie-Christine Adam, Pauline Delpech, Xavier Beauvois, and Danièle Lebrun. The film was a big success with more than two million ticket sold in France. It was the third most successful French movie in France in 2008, just behind Welcome to the Sticks and Asterix at the Olympic Games. This same year, she played in Le crime est notre affaire, directed by Pascal Thomas and based on the novel 4:50 from Paddington, written by Agatha Christie. The movie also starred Catherine Frot, André Dussollier, Claude Rich, Chiara Mastroianni, Melvil Poupaud, Christian Vadim, Hippolyte Girardot, and Yves Afonso. This was also a success with more than a million tickets sold in France. Also in 2008, the channel RTBF organised a special night for Annie, named "Quelque chose en nous d'Annie Cordy", in which a number of artists appeared to pay a tribute to her.

In 2009, she played in Wild Grass, a movie directed by Alain Resnais and starring Sabine Azéma, André Dussollier, Anne Consigny, Emmanuelle Devos, Mathieu Amalric, Michel Vuillermoz, Edouard Baer, Sara Forestier, Nicolas Duvauchelle, Paul Crauchet, and Jean-Michel Ribes. This same year, she started a new play, "Laissez-moi sortir", in which she was alone on the stage, playing the part of a great star who is locked out on her balcony and so talks and reminisces about her entire career. After the huge success of the play in 2009 she started a tour in the whole of France in 2010.

In 2011, she played in the low-budget movie "Crimes en sourdine" with Annick Alane, Ginette Garcin, and Patrick Préjean. The same year she was back in a studio with an original album : "Ca me plaît pourvu que ça vous plaise..." in which she sang songs written for her by artists such as Charles Aznavour or Alice Dona.

In 2012, she had the leading role in the TV Movie "Je retourne chez ma mère", starring also Rufus and Katia Tchenko. She also appeared in an episode of Scènes de ménage.

In 2013, she appeared in an episode of the TV Series "Y'a pas d'âge", broadcast on France 2, alongside Jérôme Commandeur, Marthe Villalonga, Claude Brasseur, Carmen Maura, and Arielle Dombasle.

In 2014, she played in Le Dernier Diamant, alongside Yvan Attal, Bérénice Bejo, Jean-François Stévenin, and Jacques Spiesser. She also appeared in an episode of "H-Man", a TV Series broadcast on Arte, alongside Arthur H. She also released a Christmas album for December with 30 jazz musicians named "Annie Cordy chante Noël".

In 2015, she was given the leading role in Les souvenirs, directed by Jean-Paul Rouve, and also starring Chantal Lauby and Michel Blanc. The movie was a great success with over a million tickets sold.
She also played in France 2's TV Series "Chefs", with a recurrent character, next to Hugo Becker, Anne Charrier, Clovis Cornillac, Juliette, Nicolas Gob, Robin Renucci, and Zinedine Soualem. She was involved in the album "Joyeux anniversaire M'sieur Dutronc" which paid tribute to Jacques Dutronc. This year, she also walked up the stairs to the 2015 Cannes Film Festival. She was also invited to the Festival du film francophone d'Angoulême for a tribute to Belgian Cinema where Impasse de la vignette and High Street were presented.

In 2016, she walked up the stairs to the 2016 Cannes Film Festival to see the movie The Unknown Girl before the movie Le Cancre was presented with the cast.

In July 2018, for her 90th birthday, she was the guest of honour of the Ommegang of Brussels. A couple of days after this event, on 8 August, the park next to the train station in Laeken, the city where she was born, was named after her.

== Death ==
On 4 September 2020, Cordy suffered cardiac arrest at her home in Vallauris, France, where she lived with her niece. Attempts to revive her were unsuccessful and she was pronounced dead. She was 92 years old.

== In popular culture ==
Albert Uderzo gave Annie Cordy a cameo as the wife of the Belgian chieftain in the Asterix comic book story Asterix in Belgium.

== Honours ==
- 2005: Baroness of Belgium.
- 24 October 2013 : Commander of the Order of the Crown.
- 2022: Léopold II Tunnel in Molenbeek-Saint-Jean renamed "Annie Cordy Tunnel"

== Filmography ==
Year	Title	Role	Director	Notes
1953	Boum sur Paris	Herself	Maurice de Canonge	
1954	April Fools' Day	Charlotte Dupuy	Gilles Grangier	
1954	Royal Affairs in Versailles	Madame Langlois	Sacha Guitry	
1955	Hello Smile !	Herself	Claude Sautet	
1955	Beautiful But Dangerous		Robert Z. Leonard	
1955	Café Continental	Mistress of ceremonies	Henry Caldwell	TV series (1 episode)
1956	The Singer from Mexico	Cri-Cri	Richard Pottier	
1957	Victor and Victoria	Titine	Karl Anton	
1958	Tabarin	Mimi	Richard Pottier	
1959	Cigarettes, Whiskey and Wild Women	Martine	Maurice Régamey	
1960	Tête folle	Annie	Robert Vernay	
1963	Je connais une blonde	Singer with cow	Georges Folgoas	TV movie
1965	The Duke's Gold	The caretaker	Jacques Baratier	
1965	Ces dames s'en mêlent	Lily	Raoul André	
1968	Ces messieurs de la famille	Maryse	Raoul André	
1969	Le bourgeois gentil mec	Mme Marthe	Raoul André	
1970	The Breach	Mme. Pinelli	Claude Chabrol	
1970	Rider on the Rain	Juliette	René Clément	
1970	Ces messieurs de la gâchette	Maryse	Raoul André	
1971	Le Chat	Nelly	Pierre Granier-Deferre	
1972	The Gates of Fire	Andrée	Claude Bernard-Aubert	
1972	Les galets d'Étretat	Brigitte	Sergio Gobbi	
1973	Le mataf	Nina	Serge Leroy	
1973	La dernière bourrée à Paris	The psychanalist	Raoul André	
1973	Elle court, elle court la banlieue	The real estate agent	Gérard Pirès	
1974	The Holes	Ginette Lalatte	Pierre Tchernia	
1974	Commissariato di notturna	Pupa	Guido Leoni	
1975	Souvenir of Gibraltar	Tina	Henri Xhonneux	
1975	Isabelle devant le désir	Isabelle's mother	Jean-Pierre Berckmans	
1976	High Street	Mimi	André Ernotte	International Emmy Award for Best Actress
1977	Drôles de zèbres	Baronne Jacinthe de la Tronchembiais	Guy Lux	
1978	The Miser	Frosine	Jean Pignol	TV movie
1978	Le bel indifférent		Marion Sarraut	TV movie
1981	Les fiançailles de feu	Mme Hortense	Pierre Bureau	TV movie
1981	Madame Sans-Gêne	Madame Sans-Gêne	Abder Isker	TV movie
1982	Madame S.O.S.	Madame S.O.S.	André Dhénaut	TV series (6 episodes)
1983	Le Braconnier de Dieu	Jofrette	Jean-Pierre Darras	
1989	Le bonheur d'en face	Irène Lecoin	Teff Erhat	TV series (1 episode)
1990	Impasse de la vignette	Mother Fine	Anne-Marie Étienne	Festivals de Digne - Best Actress
1990	Orages d'été	Céline	Jean Sagols	TV series
1993	Inspecteur Médeuze	Lucie	Philippe Triboit	TV series (1 episode)
1994	La Vengeance d'une blonde	Jany	Jeannot Szwarc	
1994	La fille du roi	Bertoune	Philippe Triboit	TV movie
1995	Vroum-vroum		Frédéric Sojcher	Short
1995	Fanny se fait un sang d'encre	Fanny Faber	Alain de Halleux	TV movie
1995	Baldi	Colette	Michel Lang	TV series (1 episode)
1996	Moi j'aime Albert		Frédéric Chaudier	Short
1996	Le refuge	Hélène	Alain Schwartzstein	TV series (1 episode)
1997	Sans cérémonie	Solange Serpette	Michel Lang	TV movie
1997	Le diable en sabots	Marie Fer	Nicole Berckmans	TV movie
1997	Une mère comme on n'en fait plus	Simone Lapierre	Jacques Renard	TV movie
1999	Un Noël de chien		Nadine Monfils	Short
2000	Baldi	Colette	Michel Lang	TV series (1 episode)
2001	La tortue	Anne Gautier	Dominique Baron	TV movie
2002	Passage du bac	Émilie	Olivier Langlois	TV movie
2002	Les rebelles de Moissac	Charlotte	Jean-Jacques Kahn	TV movie
2003	Fabien Cosma	Lucette	Jean-Pierre Vergne	TV series (1 episode)
2004	Madame Édouard	Ginette	Nadine Monfils	
2004	Zartmo	The woman	Marc Dalmans	Short
2005	Le tuteur	Antoinette Loiseau	Pierre Grimblat	TV series (1 episode)
2006	A City Is Beautiful at Night	The HLM Grandma	Richard Bohringer	
2007	The Last of the Crazy People	Rose	Laurent Achard	
2008	Disco	Mme Graindorge	Fabien Onteniente	
2008	Crime Is Our Business	Babette Boutiti	Pascal Thomas	
2009	Wild Grass	Marguerite's neighbor	Alain Resnais	
2011	Crimes en sourdine	Mme Garcia	Joël Chalude & Stéphane Onfroy	
2012	Je retourne chez ma mère	Alice	Williams Crépin	TV movie
2012	Scènes de ménage	Maion's grandmother	Francis Duquet	TV series (1 episode)
2013	Y'a pas d'âge	Yvonne P.	Stéphane Marelli	TV series (1 episode)
2014	The Last Diamond	Inès de Boissière	Éric Barbier	
2014	H-Man	Girl Telekinesis	Joseph Cahill	TV series (1 episode)
2015	Memories	Madelaine Esnard	Jean-Paul Rouve	Nominated - Magritte Award for Best Actress
2015	Chefs	Léonie	Arnaud Malherbe	TV series (6 episodes)
2016	Le Cancre	Christiane	Paul Vecchiali	
2018	Tamara Vol. 2	Rose	Alexandre Castagnetti	
2018	Les Jouvencelles	Laurenne	Delphine Corrard	Short; Entr'2 Marches International Film Festival - Best Actress
2018	Illetré	Adélaide Perez	Jean-Pierre Améris	TV movie

=== Dubbing ===
Year	Title	Role
1993	Once Upon a Forest	Bosworth
1995	Pocahontas	Grandmother Willow
2003	Brother Bear	Nanaka

=== Box-office ===
Movies starring Annie Cordy with more than a million entries in France.

	Films	Director	Year	France (entries)
1	Royal Affairs in Versailles	Sacha Guitry	1954	6,987,167
2	The Singer from Mexico	Richard Pottier	1956	4,781,633
3	Rider on the Rain	René Clément	1970	4,763,822
4	Beautiful but Dangerous	Robert Z. Leonard	1956	4,074,941
5	April Fools' Day	Gilles Grangier	1954	2,888,000
6	Disco	Fabien Onteniente	2008	2,435,015
7	La Vengeance d'une blonde	Jeannot Szwarc	1994	2,039,370
8	Boum sur Paris	Maurice de Canonge	1953	1,663,858
9	Ces messieurs de la famille	Raoul André	1968	1,626,941
10	Elle court, elle court la banlieue	Gérard Pirès	1973	1,549,617
11	Hello Smile !	Claude Sautet	1956	1,256,883
12	Crime Is Our Business	Pascal Thomas	2008	1,219,181
13	Cigarettes, Whiskey and Wild Women	Maurice Régamey	1959	1,078,295
14	Les Souvenirs	Jean-Paul Rouve	2015	1,069,244
15	Le Chat	Pierre Granier-Deferre	1971	1,035,709
16	Ces dames s'en mêlent	Raoul André	1965	1,021,325

== Stage ==
=== Theater ===
Year	Title	Author	Director	Notes
1958	Madame Sans-Gêne	Victorien Sardou and Émile Moreau	with Jean-Marc Thibault	
1986	Madame de Sévigné			
1986	La Mienne s'appelait Régine	Pierre Rey	Armand Delcampe	Théâtre de l'Œuvre
1986	Merci Apolline	Geneviève Martin	Michel Wyn	with Guy Tréjan
1987	Madame Sans-Gêne	Victorien Sardou and Émile Moreau		
1989	Mademoiselle Plume		Jean-Luc Moreau	with Charlotte Kady
1990	Sacrée Gladys			with Jacques Balutin
1994	Six heures au plus tard	Marc Perrier	Martine Willequet	with Xavier Percy
1994	La Célestine			with Gérard Chambre
2000	The Merry Wives of Windsor	William Shakespeare		with Patrick Préjean
2006	Lily & Lily	Pierre Barillet and Jean-Pierre Gredy	Gérard Moulevrier	with Jacques Ciron, Christian Morin and Firmine Richard
2009-2010	Laissez-moi sortir	Jean-Marie Chevret	Jean-Pierre Dravel & Olivier Macé	Théâtre Daunou

=== Musicals ===
Year	Title	Playwright	Notes
1952-1954	La Route fleurie	Raymond Vincy	Song : Moi, J'aime les Hommes / Da ga da Tsoin Tsoin; La belle de l'Ohio
1957-1960	Tête de linotte	Raymond Vincy	Song : Tête de linotte / Un p'tit coup de folie Je suis subitiste / A pied dans la pampa / Rosita; Le rythme des tropiques / La samba d'Ali Baba; Ah ! les brésiliennes / Jojo la fleur bleue C'est "estraordinaire" / Le petit cabri
1961-1964	Visa pour l'amour	Raymond Vincy	with Luis Mariano
1965-1967	Ouah ! Ouah !	Michel André	with Bourvil
1968	Pic et Pioche	Raymond Vincy, Jacques Mareuil and Darry Cowl	with Darry Cowl
1970	Indien vaut mieux que deux tu l'auras		with Pierre Doris
1972	Hello, Dolly !	Jacques Mareuil	At Théâtre Mogador; International Emmy Award for Best European Performer
1976	Nini la chance	Jacques Mareuil	
1982	Envoyez la musique	Jacques Mareuil and Gérard Gustin	with Patrick Préjean and Gérard Chambre

== Discography ==
Year	Title	Notes
1948	Aye ma mamy, aye ma mama	
1948	Il jouait de la contrebasse	
1948	Il aurait bien voulu	
1948	La guitare à chiquita	
1948	Papa, mama, samba	
1948	Cuanto le gusta	
1948	Les pompiers du mexique	
1948	Une fille du rodéo	
1948	C'est magic	
1950	Marie Madeleine	
1950	Les trois p'tites pommes	
1950	Bon papa Noë	
1950	A Compostelle	
1950	Le bal des voyous	
1952	Les Trois Bandits de Napoli	
1952	Quand c'est aux autos de passer	
1952	La bourrée d'Auvergne montagnarde	
1953	Bonbons, caramels, esquimaux, chocolats	
1953	Je n'peux pas	
1953	La petite Marie	
1953	La biaiseuse	
1953	La petite sonnette	
1953	La fille du Cov-bois	
1953	Et bailler et dormir	
1953	Y'en a, y'en a pas	
1953	Léon	
1953	Fleur du Tyrol	
1953	Pour les jolis yeux de Suzie	
1954	Viens à Nogent	
1954	Un gars comme ça	
1954	Le cirque Gorgonzola	
1954	Les douaniers du clair de Lune	
1954	C'est toi que je préfère	
1954	Paris chéri	
1954	La bagarre	
1955	Fleur de Papillon	
1955	La femme du Pêcheur	
1955	Oh ! Bessie	
1955	Quand le bâtiment va	
1955	Miss Pommarole	
1955	Le petit pélican	
1955	Les grenadiers du roi	
1955	Du Soleil	
1955	Tout au bout de la semaine	
1955	Bill, te fais pas de bile	
1955	Pinson Sérénade	
1955	A pied, à cheval	
1955	Mon p'tit pote	
1955	Café de chez nous	
1955	La clarinette	
1955	La petite Martiniquaise	
1955	J'ai le palpitant	
1955	Non, non merci	From Hello Smile !
1956	La Ballade de Davy Crockett	#1 in France
1956	Tantina de Burgos	
1956	Freddy	
1956	Oranges, tabac, café	
1956	Le dimanche matin	From The Singer from Mexico
1956	Ca m'fait quelqu'chose	From The Singer from Mexico
1957	Hop digui di	
1957	Oh ! la, la	
1957	La petite rouquine du vieux Brooklyn	
1957	Coquelicots polka	
1957	Tout ce que veut Lola	
1957	La Vie de famille	
1957	Viens à la gare	
1957	Je t'aime	
1958	Docteur miracle	
1958	Frenchie	
1958	La frotteuse de parquet	
1958	Danse	
1958	Ton cheveu	
1958	Comme en 1925	
1958	Patricia	
1958	J'avais rêvé d'un ange	
1958	Toréro	
1958	Attends, je viens	
1958	Loterie nationale	
1958	Hula Hoop	
1958	Mon homme à moi	
1958	Au zoo de Vincennes	
1958	Hello le soleil brille	From The Bridge on the River Kwai #1 in France
1958	Paris paname	From Tabarin
1959	La marche des gosses	#1 in France
1959	Petite Fleur	
1959	Salade de fruits	
1959	Bim-bom-bey	
1959	La fête à Loulou	
1959	Le tango ruminant	
1959	Histoire de pétrole	
1959	Le millionnaire	
1959	Tango militaire	
1959	Pantaléon	
1959	Oh ! quelle nuit	
1959	Personnalités	
1959	Ivanhoé	
1959	Rock-a-longa tango	
1959	Le ballon bleu	
1959	Cigarettes, Whisky et P'tites Pépées	From Cigarettes, Whiskey and Wild Women
1959	Tête folle	From Tête folle
1960	À Bahia	
1960	Les papous	
1960	Dis-le, dis-le moi	
1960	Accidente	
1960	Le vieux pianola	
1960	Ole, tango	
1960	Allez, Hop	
1960	Paname	
1960	Rosalie	
1964	Six Roses	
1965	Le p'tit coup de chance	with Bourvil
1968	Petite Fleur	
1970	Le chouchou de mon coeur	40 000 singles sold / #19 in France
1972	Hello, Dolly	
1974	La bonne du curé	3 000 000 singles sold / #1 in France / Platinum
1975	Frida Oum Papa	303 000 singles sold / #4 in France
1975	À la rentrée	80 000 singles sold / #20 in France
1975	Ya Kasiti	
1976	La Bébête	181 000 singles sold / #11 in France
1976	Ça ira mieux demain	95 000 singles sold / #16 in France
1976	Nini la Chance	75 000 singles sold / #20 in France
1976	Dis, pourquoi tu me bats Léon ?	
1977	L'huluberlu	80 000 singles sold / #19 in France
1978	Qui qu'en veut	109 000 singles sold / #18 in France
1978	La Madam	90 000 singles sold / #19 in France
1979	Le Kazou	153 000 singles sold / #12 in France
1981	Tata Yoyo	800 000
1981	Papa banjo, Maman violon	
1982	Si j'étais le Soleil	Credits of Madame S.O.S.
1982	Nini Pompon	
1985	Cho Ka Ka O	2 500 000
