= List of best-selling singles in France =

The following is a list of the best-selling singles in France.

== Best-selling singles in France ==
=== Over 5 million copies ===
Artist	Single	Year	Sales
Tino Rossi	"Petit Papa Noël"	1946	5,700,000

=== 2 million or more copies ===
Artist	Single	Year	Sales
J.J. Lionel	"La Danse des canards"	1981	2,700,000
Patrick Fiori, Garou and Daniel Lavoie	"Belle"	1998	2,200,000
Celine Dion	"Pour que tu m'aimes encore"	1995	2,100,000
Elton John	"Candle in the Wind 1997"/"Something About the Way You Look Tonight"	1997	2,000,000

=== 1,200,000 copies to 1,800,000 copies ===
Artist	Single	Year	Sales
John Travolta & Olivia Newton-John	"You're the One That I Want"	1978	1,800,000
Kaoma	"Lambada"	1989	1,800,000
Laurent Voulzy	"Rockollection"	1977	1,800,000
Chanteurs Sans Frontières	"Éthiopie"	1985	1,700,000
Christophe	"Aline"	1965/79	1,600,000
Les Forbans	"Chante"	1982	1,600,000
Florent Pagny	Savoir Aimer	1997	1,500,000
Ilona Mitrecey	"Un Monde parfait"	2005	1,500,000
Philippe D'Avilla, Damien Sargue & Grégori Baquet	"Les Rois du monde"	2000	1,500,000
Yannick	"Ces soirées-là"	2000	1,500,000
Herbert Léonard	"Pour le plaisir"	1981	1,400,000
Hot Butter	Popcorn	1972	1,400,000
Johnny Hallyday	Marie	2002	1,400,000
Patrick Hernandez	"Born to Be Alive"	1979	1,400,000
Ricky Martin	"(Un, Dos, Tres) Maria"	1997	1,400,000
Stone et Charden	L'avventura	1971	1,400,000
Village People	"YMCA"	1978	1,400,000
Wes	"Alane"	1997	1,400,000
Jean-Claude Borelly & His Orchestra	Dolannes Melodie	1974	1,350,000
Las Ketchup	"Asereje (The Ketchup Song)"	2002	1,310,000
Bimbo Jet	El Bimbo	1974	1,300,000
Irene Cara	"Flashdance... What a Feeling"	1983	1,300,000
Marie Myriam	"L'oiseau et l'enfant"	1977	1,300,000
Michel Sardou	"Dix ans plus tôt"	1977	1,300,000
Peter and Sloane	"Besoin de rien, envie de toi"	1984	1,300,000
Sheila	"L'école est finie"	1963	1,300,000
Crazy Frog	"Axel F"	2005	1,270,000
Alizée	"Moi... Lolita"	2000	1,200,000
Barbra Streisand	"Woman in Love"	1980	1,200,000
Chagrin d'amour	"Chacun fait ce qui lui plait"	1981	1,200,000
Larusso	Tu m'oublieras	1998	1,200,000
Les Dix Commandements	L'Envie d'aimer	2001	1,200,000
Michel Sardou	En Chantant	1978	1,200,000
Nikka Costa	Out Here on My Own	1981	1,200,000
Ottawan	T'es Ok	1980	1,200,000
Richard Sanderson	Reality	1981	1,200,000
Rose Laurens	Africa	1983	1,200,000
The Buggles	Video Killed The Radio Star	1979/80	1,200,000
The Shorts	Comment ça va	1983	1,200,000
Vanessa Paradis	Joe le taxi	1987	1,200,000

=== 1,000,000 to 1,190,000 copies ===
Artist	Single	Year	Sales
O-Zone	"Dragostea Din Tei"	2003	1,170,000
Star Academy France	"La Musique"	2001	1,140,000
Mungo Jerry	In the Summertime	1970	1,110,000
Jean-Jacques Goldman	Je te donne	1985	1,100,000
Jean-Luc Lahaye	Femme que j'aime	1982	1,100,000
Kim Carnes	Bette Davis Eyes	1981	1,100,000
Lionel Leroy	Ulysse 31	1981	1,100,000
Michael Jackson	Beat It	1983	1,100,000
Noam	"Goldorak"	1978	1,100,000
Pop Concerto Orchestra	Eden Is a Magic World	1982	1,100,000
Ray Parker Jr.	Ghostbusters	1984/85	1,100,000
Umberto Tozzi	Ti amo	1978	1,100,000
DJ BoBo	"Chihuahua"	2003	1,020,000
Annie Cordy	La bonne du curé	1974	1,000,000
Charles Aznavour	La Mamma	1969	1,000,000
VOF de Kunst	Suzanne (VOF de Kunst song)	1980	1,000,000
Boney M	Daddy Cool	1976	1,000,000
Boney M	Rivers of Babylon	1978	1,000,000
Bonnie Tyler	It's a Heartache	1977/78	1,000,000
Break Machine	Streetdance	1984	1,000,000
Chantal Goya	Allons Chanter Avec Mickey	1977	1,000,000
Claude François	Le téléphone pleure	1974	1,000,000
Cookie Dingler	Femme libérée	1984	1,000,000
Culture Club	Do You Really Want to Hurt Me	1983	1,000,000
David Alexandre Winter	Oh Lady Mary	1969	1,000,000
Daniel Balavoine	L'Aziza	1985	1,000,000
David Hallyday	Tu ne m'as pas laissé le temps	1999	1,000,000
Début de Soirée	Nuit de folie	1988	1,000,000
Ennio Morricone	Il était une fois dans l'ouest	1968-70	1,000,000
Europe	The Final Countdown	1986	1,000,000
FR David	Words	1982	1,000,000
Green & Lejeune	Pot pour rire mr le président	1974	1,000,000
Hervé Vilard	Nous	1978	1,000,000
Imagination	Just an Illusion	1982	1,000,000
Images	Les Démons de minuit	1986	1,000,000
Jairo	Les Jardins du ciel	1980	1,000,000
Jeanette	Porque te vas	1974	1,000,000
Jermaine Jackson and Pia Zadora	When the Rain Begins to Fall	1983/84	1,000,000
Kim Wilde	Cambodia	1982	1,000,000
Les Compagnons de la chanson	"Charlie Brown"	1945	1,000,000
Licence IV	Viens boire un p'tit coup à la maison	1987	1,000,000
Manau	"La Tribu de Dana"	1998	1,000,000
Mecano	"Hijo de la Luna"	1986	1,000,000
Mecano	"Une femme avec une femme"	1990	1,000,000
Michael Jackson	"Billie Jean"	1983	1,000,000
Michael Jackson	"Thriller"	1984	1,000,000
Michel Sardou	"Les Lacs du Connemara"	1981	1,000,000
Michel Sardou	"La Maladie d'amour"	1973	1,000,000
Michel Sardou	"Le Rire du Sergent"	1971	1,000,000
Mylene Farmer	Désenchantée	1991	1,000,000
Pierre Bachelet	Elle est d'ailleurs	1980	1,000,000
Pierre Bachelet	Les Corons	1982	1,000,000
Philippe Lavil	Il tape sur des bambous	1982	1,000,000
Ricchi e Poveri	Sarà perché ti amo	1981	1,000,000
Scorpions	Still Loving You	1984	1,000,000
Shakira	Whenever, Wherever	2002	1,000,000
Stéphanie	Ouragan	1986	1,000,000
Sidney Bechet	Les Oignons	1949	1,000,000
U.S.A. For Africa	We Are the World	1984	1,000,000

=== 900,000 to 990,000 copies ===
Artist	Single	Year	Sales
Carrapicho	"Tic Tic Tac"	1996	980,000
Adriano Celentano	Don't Play That Song	1977/78	900,000
Andrea Bocelli	Con te partirò	1995	900,000
Bibie	Tout doucement	1985	900,000
Claude Barzotti	Le rital	1983	900,000
Dorothée	Hou! la menteuse	1982	900,000
Dorothée	Rox et Rouky	1981	900,000
Ennio Morricone	Chi Mai	1981	900,000
Kajagoogoo	Too Shy	1983	900,000
Jean-Luc Lahaye	Papa chanteur	1985	900,000
Julie Pietri	Ève lève-toi	1986	900,000
Plastic Bertrand	Ça plane pour moi	1977	900,000
