= Robert Favart =

French actor (1911–2003)

Marc Robert Favart
- Born: 9 February 1911; Alexandria, Egypt
- Died: 26 July 2003 (aged 92); Nogent-sur-Marne (Val-de-Marne), France
- Occupation: Actor
- Years active: 1938–1983
- Spouse(s): Jenny Carré, daughter of Albert Carré

Marc Robert Favart (9 February 1911 – 26 July 2003) was a French actor, married to Jenny Carré, daughter of Albert Carré.

== Filmography ==
=== Film ===
- 1938: The City of Lights (by Jean de Limur)
- 1939: Angelica or La rose de sang (by Jean Choux)
- 1941: Those of the Sky (by Yvan Noé) - a pilot
- 1941: Parade en sept nuits (by Marc Allégret) - Raymond (uncredited)
- 1942: Le Destin fabuleux de Désirée Clary (by Sacha Guitry) - Lannes
- 1943: Des jeunes filles dans la nuit (by René Le Hénaff)
- 1943: Le Brigand gentilhomme (by Émile Couzinet) - Don Fernand de Torilhas
- 1944: La Malibran (by Sacha Guitry) - Le ravisseur
- 1946: Strange Fate (by Louis Cuny) - Philipe - l'assistant du professeur
- 1948: Colonel Durand (by René Chanas) - Bertrand de Lormoy
- 1948: Memories Are Not for Sale (by Robert Hennion) - Dessanges
- 1948: The Lame Devil (by Sacha Guitry) - Abbé Dupanloup (uncredited)
- 1951: Sous le ciel de Paris (by Julien Duvivier) - Maximilien
- 1951: Les Mousquetaires du roi (by Marcel Aboulker and Michel Ferry) (unfinished film)
- 1954: Royal Affairs in Versailles (by Sacha Guitry) - M. de Calènes (uncredited)
- 1955: Napoléon (by Sacha Guitry) - Count Otto
- 1955: Gentlemen Marry Brunettes (by Richard Sale) - Hotel manager
- 1956: Ce soir les jupons volent (by Dimitri Kirsanoff) - Prince Soliman Ben Salah
- 1964: Faites sauter la banque! (by Jean Girault) - the Italian colleague (uncredited)
- 1964: Coplan, agent secret FX-18 (by Maurice Cloche) - the Italian colonel
- 1964: De l'assassinat considéré comme un des beaux-arts (by Maurice Boutel)
- 1965: The Majordomo (by Jean Delannoy) - Maître Boissard
- 1965: Passeport diplomatique agent K8 (by Robert Vernay)
- 1965: Coplan FX 18 casse tout (by Riccardo Freda)
- 1966: Angelique and the King (by Bernard Borderie) - the surgeon
- 1966: Killer's Carnival (by Alberto Cardone, Sheldon Reynolds, Robert Lynn and Louis Soulanès) - Sergej (Vienna segment) (uncredited)
- 1966: Triple Cross (by Terence Young) - General Dalrymple
- 1967: The Night of the Generals (by Anatole Litvak) - the airport employee (uncredited)
- 1967: I Killed Rasputin (by Robert Hossein)
- 1967: Le Samourai (by Jean-Pierre Melville) - Le patron du bar
- 1970: Last Known Address (by José Giovanni) - the school principal
- 1970: The Mushroom (by Marc Simenon)
- 1970: Last Leap (by Édouard Luntz) - L'adjoint de Jauran
- 1970: Children of Mata Hari (by Jean Delannoy) - Le commissaire principal
- 1970: Le Cercle rouge (by Jean-Pierre Melville) - the salesman by Mauboussin
- 1971: Max et les Ferrailleurs (by Claude Sautet) - Loiselle
- 1971: La Part des lions (by Jean Larriaga)
- 1971: The Widow Couderc (by Pierre Granier-Deferre)
- 1972: The Pebbles of Étretat (by Sergio Gobbi)
- 1973: The Woman in Blue (by Michel Deville) - Le premier automobiliste
- 1973: The Hostage Gang (by Édouard Molinaro) - Ange
- 1973: Don Juan, or If Don Juan Were a Woman (by Roger Vadim)
- 1973: Moi y'en a vouloir des sous (by Jean Yanne) - the Italian delegate
- 1973: The Day of the Jackal (by Fred Zinnemann) - Minister (uncredited)
- 1973: Le Mataf (by Serge Leroy)
- 1973: The Mad Adventures of Rabbi Jacob (by Gérard Oury) - Un invité au marriage (uncredited)
- 1974: The Four Charlots Musketeers (by André Hunebelle) - M. de Tréville
- 1974: Chinese in Paris (by Jean Yanne) - Le collaborateur de Montaubert
- 1974: Paul and Michelle (Paul and Michelle) (by Lewis Gilbert) - the teacher
- 1974: Creezy (by Pierre Granier-Deferre)
- 1974: The Four Charlots Musketeers 2 (by André Hunebelle) - M. de Tréville
- 1974: Verdict (by André Cayatte) - Professor Chartier, Annie's father
- 1974: Hommes de joie pour femmes vicieuses (by Pierre Chevalier)
- 1975: Playing with Fire (by Alain Robbe Grillet) - the banquer
- 1975: Catherine et Compagnie (by Michel Boisrond)
- 1976: Scrambled Eggs (by Joël Santoni)
- 1981: La Pension des surdoués (by Pierre Chevalier) - Le père de la militante (uncredited)
- 1983: La Scarlatine (by Gabriel Aghion)

=== Television ===
- 1970: Lancelot du Lac (by Claude Santelli) (Téléfilm) - the king fisher
- 1971: Les nouvelles aventures de Vidocq (TV serial) - the préfect of the Rhône
- 1972: Kean: Un roi de Théâtre (by Marcel Moussy) (Téléfilm) - Elliston
- 1973: Le Monde merveilleux de Paul Gilson (by Frédéric Jacques Temple, Nino Frank and Philippe Agostini, directed by Philippe Agostini)
- 1973: Les rois maudits (TV serial) - the knight
- 1973: The Bread Peddler (TV series) (Série TV)
- 1973: Au théâtre ce soir (Série TV) - La Bécotterie
- 1974: Une affaire à suivre (by Alain Boudet) (Téléfilm) - Cruchot
- 1978: Aurélien by Michel Favart (Téléfilm) - Maro Polo
- 1979: Un juge, un flic (Série TV) - Bortocelli
- 1980: La peau de chagrin (by Michel Favart) (Téléfilm) - Duke of Navarreins
- 1982: Adieu by Pierre Badel (Téléfilm) - General de Vandières
- 1986: Sins (Série TV) - Dr. Beaumais
- 1987: La nuit du coucou by Michel Favart (Téléfilm) - Man in the hall
- 1988: War and Remembrance (TV serial) - Count of Chambrun (final appearance)

== Theater ==
=== Author ===
- 1973: Au théâtre ce soir : Le Bonheur des autres by Robert Favart, mise-en-scene Jacques Sereys, directed by Georges Folgoas, Théâtre Marigny
- 1983: Madame… pas dame, directed by Marcelle Tassencourt, Théâtre Montansier

=== Comédian ===
- 1941: Marché noir by Steve Passeur, directed by Camille Corney, théâtre Édouard VII
- 1942: L'Étoile de Séville by Lope de Vega, directed by Maurice Jacquemont, Comédie des Champs-Élysées
- 1944: Le Roi Christin by Marcelle Maurette, Théâtre Édouard VII
- 1948: Interdit au public by Roger Dornès and Jean Marsan, directed by Alfred Pasquali, Comédie-Wagram
- 1967: La Maison des cœurs brisés by George Bernard Shaw, directed by Jean Tasso, Centre dramatique de l'Est

=== Theater director ===
- 1946: Le Roi sans amour, three acts play by Paul Mourousy, Théâtre des Bouffes du Nord
