= Pascal Cervo =

French actor (born 1977)

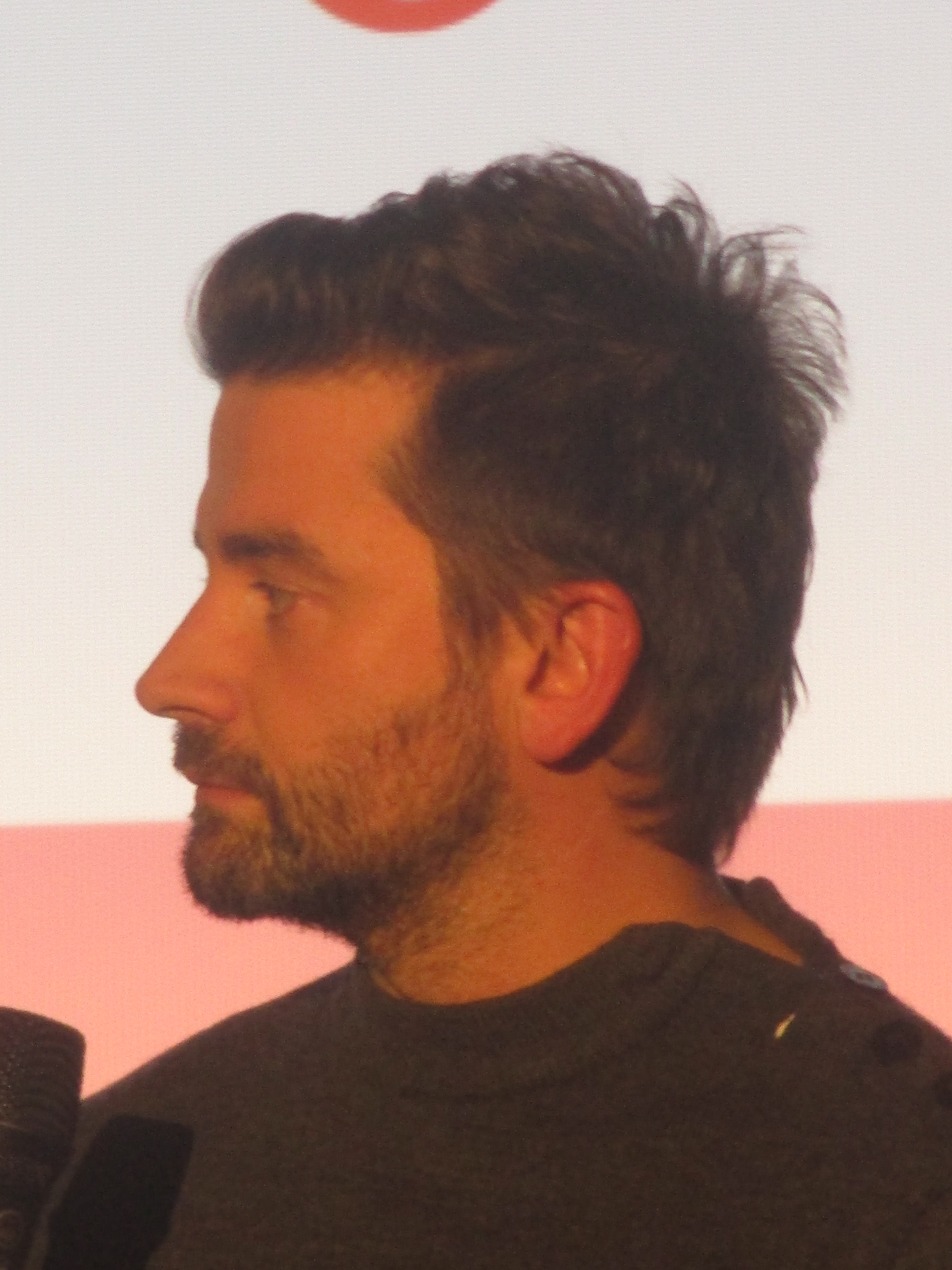
- Pascal Cervo in November 2017
- Born: 16 July 1977 (age 49); Soisy-sur-Seine, France
- Occupations: Actor, director, screenwriter
- Years active: 1993–present

Pascal Cervo (born 16 July 1977) is a French film director, screenwriter and actor.

== Life and career ==
Pascal Cervo grew up in Soisy-sur-Seine, Essonne, France.

He was discovered at the age of 16 while shopping in Paris by Catherine Corsini for her film Les Amoureux (with Nathalie Richard), where he played Marc, a teenager who began to realize his homosexuality. He then played in À toute vitesse (Full Speed), a film by young Gaël Morel where he was Quentin, a writer that everyone falls in love with. Pascal Cervo has been observed to pursue a career of long-lasting collaborations, working with art filmmakers such as Gaël Morel, Laurent Achard, Paul Vecchiali (of whom Cervo is one of his favorite and recurring actors), and Pierre Léon, among others. He also worked with Jean-Claude Biette and Robert Guédiguian and played in TV series and in theatre.

He directed three short films, the first in 2008 Valérie n'est plus ici (Valérie is not here anymore), then Monsieur Lapin (Mister Rabbit) - a reflection on loneliness - in 2013 and Hugues in 2017, for which he won the short film prize of the festival of Pantin.

Pascal Cervo replies to Catherine Deneuve in Le Cancre (2016). He was recently praised for his first role in Jours de France (Four Days in France) in 2017, where he interprets Pierre, who, after leaving his companion Paul (Arthur Igual), travels France randomly and meets unknown people using Grindr.

== Filmography ==
=== As actor ===
- 1994 : Les Amoureux by Catherine Corsini : Marc
- 1995 : À toute vitesse (Full Speed) by Gaël Morel : Quentin
- 1997 : Plus qu'hier moins que demain by Laurent Achard - Bernard
- 1998 : Prague vu par... by Petr Václav
- 1999 : The Girl by Sande Zeig - the receptionist
- 1999 : Peau d'homme, cœur de bête by Hélène Angel - Alex
- 2002 : La Guerre à Paris (The War in Paris) by Yolande Zauberman - Inspecteur Combes
- 2003 : Elle est des nôtres by Siegrid Alnoy
- 2003 : Saltimbank by Jean-Claude Biette - Félix
- 2006 : Le Dernier des fous (Demented) by Laurent Achard - Didier
- 2008 : Lady Jane by Robert Guédiguian - lieutenant
- 2009 : L'Armée du crime (The Army of Crime) by Robert Guédiguian - Bourlier
- 2011 : À moi seule (Coming Home) by Frédéric Videau
- 2011 : En ville (Iris in Bloom) by Valérie Mréjen and Bertrand Schefer - a friend
- 2011 : Dernière Séance (Last Screening) by Laurent Achard - Sylvain
- 2013 : Biette by Pierre Léon
- 2013 : Faux Accords by Paul Vecchiali
- 2014 : Fever by Raphaël Neal - Sasha
- 2015 : Nuits blanches sur la jetée by Paul Vecchiali - Fédor (from a novel by Dostoievsky)
- 2015 : C'est l'amour by Paul Vecchiali - Daniel
- 2015 : Deux Rémi, deux by Pierre Léon - Rémi Pardon (from a novel by Dostoievsky)
- 2016 : Le Cancre by Paul Vecchiali - Laurent
- 2017 : Four Days in France by Jérôme Reybaud - Pierre Thomas
- 2017 : Drôles d'oiseaux (Strange Birds) by Élise Girard - Roman
- 2018 : Love Blooms by Michaël Dacheux - Jérôme
- 2022 : Le Lycéen (Winter Boy) by Christophe Honoré - Father Benoît

=== As actor in short films ===
- 1998 : Coup de lune by Emmanuel Hamon
- 1999 : Apesanteurs by Valérie Gaudissart
- 2001 : Verte by Christophe Monier
- 2006 : Histoire naturelle by Ysé Tran
- 2008 : Prendre l'air by Nicolas Leclère (issued in 2014)
- 2008 : Sans Howard by Ricardo Munoz - François
- 2009 : Regarder Oana by Sébastien Laudenbach
- 2009 : French Courvoisier by Valérie Mréjen
- 2013 : Malfaisant by Alexia Walther and Maxime Matray
- 2013 : Le Tableau by Laurent Achard - Loïc
- 2014 : Just Married by Paul Vecchiali
- 2014 : La Cérémonie by Paul Vecchiali
- 2016 : Enfant chéri by Valérie Mréjen and Bertrand Schefer - Axel
- 2017 : Dernières nouvelles du monde by François Prodromidès - the messenger

=== As filmmaker ===
- 2009 : Valérie n'est plus ici - short film
- 2013 : Monsieur Lapin - short film
- 2017: Hugues - short film
