= Ernotte =

Ernotte is a surname. Notable people with the surname include:

- André Ernotte (1943–1999), Belgian film director and screenwriter
- Delphine Ernotte (born 1966), French businesswoman
