= Commissariato di notturna =

- Directed by: Guido Leoni
- Written by: Giacomo Furia; Guido Leoni
- Starring: Rosanna Schiaffino; Gastone Moschin; Emma Danieli; Leopoldo Trieste; Carlo Giuffrè; Annie Cordy
- Cinematography: Claudio Racca
- Music by: Renato Rascel
- Release date: 1974
- Country: Italy
- Language: Italian

Commissariato di notturna is a 1974 Italian crime-comedy film directed by Guido Leoni. It was one of the few films that tried to mix the classical commedia all'italiana with the poliziottesco genre.

== Cast ==
- Rosanna Schiaffino: Sonia
- Gastone Moschin: Commissario Emiliano Borghini
- George Ardisson: Amedeo Furlan aka il Laureando
- Antonio Casagrande: Gennarino
- Emma Danieli: Lucia Bencivenga
- Giacomo Furia: brigadiere Santini
- Gisela Hahn: donna tedesca
- Leopoldo Trieste: Brigadiere Spanò
- Liana Trouche: Luisa, moglie di Borghini
- Mario Valdemarin: Ferrari
- Maurice Ronet: Vittorio Cazzaniga
- Luciano Salce: On. Luigi Colacioppi
- Carlo Giuffrè: Antonio Carnevale aka Teodoro
- Annie Cordy: Pupa
- Aldo Bufi Landi: Appuntato
- Jean Lefebvre: Dindino
- Michele Gammino: Brigadiere Frascà
- Piero Gerlini: Monsignor Guidardini
- Roger Coggio: Cristoforo
- Ada Pometti: Anna Maria, Gennarino's daughter
- Nerina Montagnani: Old woman in black
