= The Singer from Mexico =

- Directed by: Richard Pottier
- Written by: Raymond Vincy; Jesus Maria de Arozamena; Félix Gandéra
- Produced by: Benito Perojo
- Starring: Luis Mariano; Bourvil; Annie Cordy; Fernando Rey
- Cinematography: Lucien Joulin
- Edited by: Maurice Serein
- Music by: Francis Lopez
- Production companies: Productions Jason; Producciones Benito Perojo
- Distributed by: Vauban Productions
- Release date: 24 January 1957 (France)
- Running time: 85 minutes
- Countries: France; Spain
- Language: French
- Box office: $31,066,327

The Singer from Mexico (French: Le Chanteur de Mexico) is a French-Spanish musical film directed by Richard Pottier starring Luis Mariano and Bourvil, released in 1957. It was a screen version of Francis Lopez's operetta that premiered at the Théâtre du Châtelet on 15 December 1951. It was in a tradition of operetta films that stretched back to the early sound era.

It was shot at the Billancourt Studios and on location in Paris and Spain. The film's sets were designed by the art directors Sigfrido Burmann and Serge Piménoff.

== Soundtrack ==
"Francis Lopez composed for Le Chanteur de Mexico one of his best scores in which the arias integrate well into the atmosphere of the action; the airs were rapidly on everybody's lips: Mexico, Rossignol, Acapulco, Il est un coin de France, Maïtechu, Quant on voit Paris d'en haut, Quant on est deux amis."

The operetta was revived in 2006 at the Théâtre du Châtelet with a cast that included Ismaël Jordi, Rossy de Palma, Jean Benguigui and Clotilde Courau.

== Cast ==
- Luis Mariano as Miguel Morano/Vincent Etchebar
- Bourvil as Bilou
- Annie Cordy as Cri-Cri
- Tilda Thamar as Eva Marchal
- Fernando Rey as Cartoni
- Gisèle Grandpré as La Tornada
- Pauline Carton as Cri-Cri's Aunt
- Paul Faivre as Bidache
- Manolo Morán as Martínez
- Jacques Angelvin as Le speaker du radio crochet
- Robert Dalban as Le portier du théâtre
- Fernando Rey as Cartoni - l'impresario
