= Salade de fruits =

Single by Bourvil
- Language: French
- Released: 1959
- Label: Pathé Marconi EMI
- Composers: Armand Canfora, Noël Roux
- Lyricist: Noël Roux

Music video
- "Salade de fruits" (French TV, 1959) on YouTube

"Salade de fruits" (Translation: Fruit salad) is a 1959 song by French comedy actor Bourvil. The lyrics describe a French Polynesian girl whose name is Fruit Salad and who is compared by the singer to a literal fruit salad, being just as delicious and nice. He sings that his father and mother like her that he wants to marry her.

== Background and writing ==
The song was written by Noël Roux and Armand Canfora.

== Commercial performance ==
In France the song was released on an EP by Bourvil in 1959.

Soon it was covered by Belgian actress and singer Annie Cordy. (She also released her version on an EP.)

In Wallonia (French Belgium) the song reached no. 3.

== Track listings ==
=== Bourvil version ===
7-inch EP Pathé EG 488 M

A1. "Salade de fruits" (3:15)
A2. "Les rois fainéants" (3:06)
B. "On a vécu pour ça" (4:16)

=== Annie Cordy version ===
7-inch EP Columbia ESRF 1235 M

1. A1. "Ivanhoe"
2. A2. "Qu'il fait bon vivre"
3. B1. "Salade de fruits"
4. B2. "Personalités"

== Cover versions ==
The tune has also been recorded by Luis Mariano (in 1960), Franck Pourcel, Mad Dodo (in 1992), and Roberto Alagna (in 2005).

== Charts ==
Chart (1960)	Peak position
Belgium (Ultratop 50 Wallonia)	3
