= Le Dernier des fous =

- Directed by: Laurent Achard
- Screenplay by: Laurent Achard; Nathalie Najem
- Based on: The Last of The Crazy People by Timothy Findley
- Produced by: Dominique Barneaud; Robert Guédiguian
- Starring: Julien Cochelin; Annie Cordy; Pascal Cervo
- Distributed by: Ad Vitam Distribution
- Release dates: 10 August 2006 (Locarno); 3 January 2007 (France)
- Running time: 95 minutes
- Country: France
- Language: French

Le Dernier des fous (also titled The Last of the Crazy People and Demented) is a 2006 French drama film directed by Laurent Achard. It won the Best Direction Award at the Locarno International Film Festival, and the Prix Jean Vigo in 2006. The scenario is based on The Last of the Crazy People (1967) by Canadian author Timothy Findley, translated into French in 1994.

== Synopsis ==
In a contemporary rural setting on a farm deep in the French countryside, 10-year old Martin lives with members of his family, of which he witnesses its gradual disintegration. His mother, mentally ill, is kept away in an upstairs room, his older brother Didier is in despair at his failures in life and love, his grandparents distant. He is at least attached to the maid of the house. Despite his wish to understand and help them, nothing can stop the slide to a tragic end; Martin prepares himself to put a stop to all the disarray.

== Cast ==
- Julien Cochelin as Martin
- Annie Cordy as Rose
- Pascal Cervo as Didier, Martin's older brother
- Dominique Reymond as Nadège
- Jean-Yves Chatelais as Jean
- Florence Giorgetti as Jacqueline
- Thomas Laroppe as Raphaël
- Nicolas Leclère as the teacher
