= April Fools' Day (1954 film) =

1954 film

- Directed by: Gilles Grangier
- Written by: Michel Audiard; Gérard Carlier; Gilles Grangier
- Produced by: Jean-Paul Guibert
- Starring: Bourvil; Annie Cordy; Louis de Funès
- Cinematography: Marc Fossard
- Edited by: Jacqueline Thiédot
- Music by: Étienne Lorin
- Production companies: Victory Film; Intermondia Films
- Distributed by: Victory Films
- Release date: 28 July 1954 (France)
- Running time: 102 minutes
- Country: France
- Language: French
- Box office: $21,660,000

April Fools' Day or Poisson d'avril, is a French comedy film from 1954, directed by Gilles Grangier, written by Michel Audiard, starring Bourvil, Annie Cordy, and Louis de Funès.

== Plot ==
Honest garage mechanic, faithful husband and good father, Emile Dupuy was persuaded by the patter of a salesman at a bazaar to buy a cane fishing model with the money intended for his wife Charlotte's dream: a washing machine. Not daring to tell her, he will lie, small lies, wholesale lies, and finds himself in an inextricable situation.

== Cast ==
- Bourvil : Emile Dupuy
- Annie Cordy : Charlotte Dupuy
- Louis de Funès : The gamekeeper
- Denise Grey : Clémentine Prévost
- Pierre Dux : Gaston Prévost
- Jacqueline Noëlle : Annette Coindet
- Paul Faivre : Louis
- Charles Lemontier : M. André
- Jean Hébey : M. Dutreille
- Nono Zammit : M. Gauthier
- Guy Loriquet : Léon
- Gérard Sabatier : Jacky
- Zeimet : Germain
- Louis Bugette : The garage's owner
- Maurice Biraud : The seller of fishing equipment
- Suzanne Grey : The neighbor
- René Havard : The examiner
- Gérard Darrieu : The delivery guy
- Charles Denner : A café's client
