= Laurent Achard =

French film director and screenwriter (1964–2024)

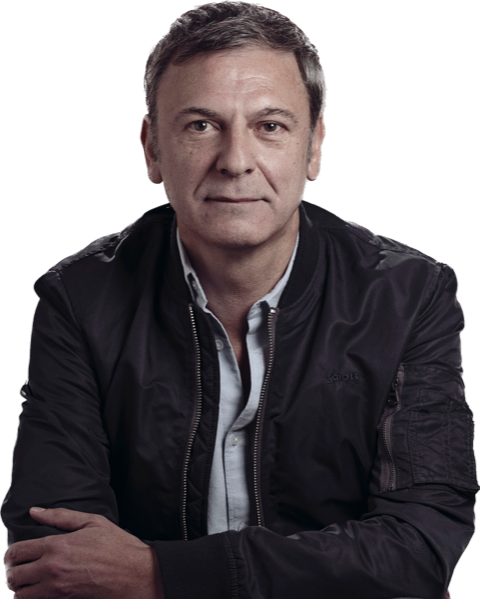
- Achard in 2021
- Born: 17 April 1964; Yonne, France
- Died: 25 March 2024 (aged 59)
- Occupations: Film director, screenwriter

Laurent Achard (17 April 1964 – 25 March 2024) was a French film director and screenwriter.

== Biography ==
Born in the Yonne department on 17 April 1964, Achard experienced a difficult childhood. He was "saved" when a school lent him a copy of Cahiers du Cinéma. He moved to Paris and failed the entrance exam for La Fémis, but met Sólveig Anspach, who introduced him to film producer Maurice Tinchant. He directed his first film with Pierre Grise Productions, a short film titled Qu'en savent les morts ?.

Achard was influenced in the industry by Maurice Pialat and Jean Renoir. The films Dimanche ou les fantômes and Une odeur de géranium received a prize at the festival of Clermont-Ferrand. In 1999, he directed his first feature film Plus qu'hier, moins que demain. In 2006, he received the Prix Jean Vigo for Le Dernier des fous. His film Last Screening was selected in 2011 for the Festival Internacional de Cine de Locarno and the Entrevues Belfort Film Festival. He also directed two documentaries: Un, parfois deux and Brisseau, 251 rue Marcadet.

Achard died on 25 March 2024, less than a month before he was to turn 60.

== Filmography ==
=== Director ===
- Qu'en savent les morts? (1991)
- Dimanche ou les fantômes (1994)
- Une odeur de géranium (1997)
- Plus qu'hier, moins que demain (1999)
- La Peur, petit chasseur (2004)
- Le Dernier des fous (2007)
- Last Screening (2011)
- Le Tableau (2012)
- Un, parfois deux (2016)
- Brisseau, 251 rue Marcadet (2018)
- Simple messieurs (2020)
- Avant Saturne (2022)

=== Screenwriter ===
- Qu'en savent les morts ? (1991)
- Dimanche ou les fantômes (1994)
- Une odeur de géranium (1997)
- La Peur, petit chasseur (2004)
- Le Dernier des fous (2007)
- Last Screening (2011)
- Le Tableau (2012)
- Un, parfois deux (2016)
- Brisseau, 251 rue Marcadet (2018)
- Simple messieurs (2020)
- Avant Saturne (2022)
