= Le mataf =

1973 film

- Film poster
- Directed by: Serge Leroy
- Written by: Roberto Gianviti; Serge Leroy; Charles Slama
- Starring: Michel Constantin; Annie Cordy
- Cinematography: Edmond Séchan
- Music by: Stelvio Cipriani
- Release date: 14 June 1973
- Running time: 90 minutes
- Countries: France; Italy
- Language: French

Le mataf (Italian: Tre per una grande rapina) is a 1973 drama film directed by Serge Leroy and starring Michel Constantin.

== Plot ==
Three bank robbers, "Le Mataf", Basilio and Franck, are preparing to conduct a hold-up when they witness a young woman being thrown out of a window by two men. The two killers manage to take compromising photos of Mataf and his gang, and coerce them into stealing a microfilm. The gang receives as a down payment a suitcase containing US$100 million.

== Cast ==
- Michel Constantin as Bernard Solville
- Adolfo Celi as Me Desbordes
- Georges Géret as Basilio Hagon
- Annie Cordy as Nina
- Cathy Rosier as Cathy Mondor
- Pierre Santini as Frank Mazier
- Bob Asklöf as Bob (billed as Bob Asklof)
- Billy Kearns
- Carl Studer as Sam
- Julie Dassin as Madeleine
- Michèle Delacroix
- Danielle Durou
- Lucien Duval
- Robert Favart
- Antonella Lolito
- Pippo Merisi as Jackie the Eel
- Carlo Nell
- Jacques Rispal as Nurse
- Pierre Zannier
