= Armand Eloi =

Belgian actor and director

Armand Éloi
- Born: 29 August 1962 (age 62); Liège, Belgium
- Occupation: actor

Armand Éloi (born 29 August 1962 in Liège) a Belgian actor and director. He graduated in the ENSATT (school of la rue Blanche) and has created, together with the scenographer Emmanuelle Sage, the Théâtre du Passeur.

== Works ==
- 1993 : La Chunga de Mario Vargas Llosa (création nationale) Premier Prix des Rencontres Charles-Dullin 1994.
- 1994 : Le Corps de Léonard de Michel Danton
- 1996 : Les Noces du Romanode John Millington Synge
- 1997 : L'Antichambre de Jean-Claude Brisville
- 1999 : La Balade du Grand Macabre de Ghelderode
- 2001 : Mais n'te promène donc pas toute nue de Georges Feydeau
- 2001 : Le Jardin de Perrot de Joëlle Moussafir
- 2002 : Perroquin de Tim Rescala
- 2005 : La Chunga de Mario Vargas Llosa (nouvelle mise en scène)

Roles in film, television and theater:

- 1987 : Spot Ford, publicité de Jean-Jacques Annaud
- 1988 : La Meute - Jaspard - m.e.s. T. Chauvière
- 1988 : L'Or du Diable, téléfilm de Jean-Louis Fournier
- 1989 : Molière 89 - Molière - m.e.s. G. Rosset - Compagnie de l’Orle d’Or
- 1989 : L'Enfant de l’étoile - Wilde - m.e.s. A. Loncin - Le petit théâtre
- 1989 : Les Nuits Révolutionnaires, téléfilm de Charles Brabant
- 1989 : Impasse de la vignette, film d'Anne-Marie Etienne
- 1990 : Le Gros Lapin, spectacle multimedia de Béatrice Hammer
- 1990 : La Veillée, film de Samy Pavel
- 1990 : À quel sein se vouer - Louki - m.e.s. J-C. Hervé
- 1991 : Antigone - Sophocle - m.e.s. C. Farré - Compagnie C. Farré.
- 1992 : La Voleuse de Londres Neveu - m.e.s. D. Cohen - Compagnie Théâtre Azimuts
- 1992 - 2003: Y a-t-il des tigres au Congo? - Ahlfors - m.e.s. A. Loncin - Le petit théâtre
- 1995 : Les Plaideurs - Racine - m.e.s. A. Loncin – Le Théâtre du Passeur
- 1997/98 : Liliom - F.Molnar - m.e.s. S. Chévara - Mack et les Gars
- 1999 : Valentin Haüy – Sophie Bensadoun – film institutionnel (rôle titre)
- 2000 : Vérités ou mensonges - Bruno Nuytten – stage de formation cinéma
- 2001 - 2003 : L’Epidémie – Maxime Bourotte – Le Théâtre du Passeur
- 2001 : Jim la nuit – Bruno Nuytten - Arte
- 2002 : Ecoute Nicolas – téléfilm de Roger Kahane – France 2
- 2003/04 : Una Estrella – Paloma Pedrero – m.e.s Pantxika Velez – Arguia Théâtre
- 2005 : Les Histoires extraordinaires de Pierre Bellemarre – docufiction – France 3
