= Boum sur Paris =

1953 French variety film

- Directed by: Maurice de Canonge
- Written by: Jacques Chabannes; Roger Féral; Maurice de Canonge
- Produced by: Edmond Ténoudji
- Starring: Jacques Pills; Armand Bernard
- Cinematography: Jean Bachelet
- Edited by: Isabelle Elman
- Music by: Louiguy
- Production company: Les Films Marceau
- Distributed by: Les Films Marceau
- Release date: November 1953 (France)
- Running time: 95 minutes
- Country: France
- Language: French

Boum sur Paris, is a French comedy film from 1953, directed by Maurice de Canonge.

== Plot ==
In the early 1950s, the popular radio program "La Kermesse aux Étoiles", hosted by the famous Jean Nohain, mixing lottery games and performances of various artists will be disturbed by the adventures of a man and his bride seeking to retrieve a dangerous perfume bottle (explosive) which was inadvertently mixed with prizes ...

== Cast ==
- Jacques Pills as Gilbert Sestrières
- Danielle Godet as Hélène
- Armand Bernard as Calchas
- Luce Feyrer as Lola Robert
- Gary Cooper as himself
- Annie Cordy as herself
- Édith Piaf as herself
- Juliette Gréco as herself
- Line Renaud as herself
- Gilbert Bécaud as himself
- Charles Trenet as himself
- Charles Boyer as himself
- Martine Carol as herself
- Andréa Parisy as herself
- Gisèle Pascal as herself
- Gregory Peck as himself
- Lucienne Delyle as herself
- Paul Demange as himself
- Marcel Mouloudji as himself
- Gina Lollobrigida as herself
