= Hello Smile ! =

- Directed by: Claude Sautet
- Written by: Jean Marsan; Yves Robert; Darry Cowl; Jean Carmet; Annie Cordy
- Starring: Henri Salvador; Louis de Funès
- Cinematography: Léonce-Henri Burel
- Edited by: Yvonne Martin
- Music by: Jean Constantin
- Distributed by: Sirius
- Release date: 29 February 1956 (France)
- Running time: 90 minutes
- Country: France
- Language: French
- Box office: $8,169,739

Hello Smile ! or Bonjour sourire, is a French comedy film from 1956, directed by Claude Sautet, written by Jean Marsan, starring Henri Salvador and Louis de Funès. The film is known under the titles "Die tolle Residenz" (West Germany), "Sourire aux lèvres" (Belgium French title).

== Plot ==
The small principality of Monte Marino is in turmoil over the sorrow of Princess Aline, heir to the throne. The Prime Minister hopes to make her smile, both to win her affection and to further his ambitions for the crown. Despite all his attempts, Princess Aline's sadness does not improve. It will take four Parisian entertainers -Jimmy Gaillard, Annie Cordy, Henri Salvador and Christian Duvaleix - joining forces to bring her joy back.

== Cast ==
- Olga Thorel : Princess Aline, Daisy, Sophie
- Louis de Funès : M. Bonoeil
- Marcel Lupovici : Anatole d'Erceny
- Jean Carmet : Jean Courtebride
- Annie Cordy : Herself
- Henri Salvador : Himself
- Jimmy Gaillard : Himself
- Christian Duvaleix : Himself
- Lisette Lebon : Rosette
- André Philipp : The King of Monte-Néro
- Darry Cowl : The doctor
- Harry-Max : Double Note, professor of music
- Bernard Musson : The butler
- Pierre Duncan : The policeman
