= Hanged Man's Farm =

1945 film by Jean Dréville

Hanged Man's Farm (French: La ferme du pendu) is a 1945 French drama film directed by Jean Dréville and starring Charles Vanel and Bourvil.

It had admissions in France of 2,703,664, making it one of the most popular films of the year.
