= Beautiful but Dangerous =

1955 film by Robert Z. Leonard

- Theatrical release poster
- Italian: La donna più bella del mondo
- Directed by: Robert Z. Leonard
- Screenplay by: Giuseppe Cavagna; Liana Ferri; Luciano Martino; Mario Monicelli; Piero Pierotti; Franco Solinas; Giovanna Soria
- Story by: Maleno Malenotti
- Produced by: Maleno Malenotti
- Starring: Gina Lollobrigida; Vittorio Gassman; Robert Alda; Anne Vernon; Tamara Lees
- Cinematography: Mario Bava
- Edited by: Eraldo Da Roma
- Music by: Renzo Rossellini
- Production companies: G.E.S.I. Cinematografica; Sédif Productions
- Distributed by: G.E.S.I. Cinematografica (Italy); Cocinor (France)
- Release dates: 21 October 1955 (Italy); 16 March 1956 (France)
- Running time: 107 minutes
- Countries: Italy; France
- Language: Italian

Beautiful but Dangerous (Italian: La donna più bella del mondo, lit. 'The World's Most Beautiful Woman'; French: La belle des belles) is a 1955 romantic comedy-drama film directed by Robert Z. Leonard. It is a biographical film about Italian opera soprano Lina Cavalieri. The film is a co-production between Italy and France. For her portrayal of Cavalieri, Gina Lollobrigida won a David di Donatello for Best Actress.

== Plot ==
In 1905 Rome, Lina Cavalieri is an orphan who was raised in poverty by her adoptive mother, Olimpia, a music hall singer who sacrificed herself to pay for Lina's singing lessons. When Olimpia suffers a heart attack during a performance at a dingy theater in Trastevere, Lina takes the stage in her mother's place, despite never singing in public before. She receives a standing ovation and attracts the attention of the prince of Russia, Sergio Bariatin, but learns that Olimpia has been hospitalised following another heart attack.

Sergio offers to take Lina to the hospital in his coach. Without revealing he is a prince, Sergio tells Lina he has come to Rome to participate in a horse race before he leaves for Paris. Before Lina rushes into the hospital, Sergio secretly places money and his gold ring in her handbag. She is then informed of her mother's death.

The next day at the horse riding club, Lina discovers that Sergio is the prince of Russia. He tells her that she can return the money and the ring to him when she becomes a famous singer in Paris. With the money Sergio gave her, Lina goes to a music school and hires their best teacher, Giovanni Doria, who trains her and soon brings her to Paris. Doria falls in love with Lina and offers to advance her singing career, but Lina, still in love with Sergio, leaves him.

During an audition, Lina befriends Carmela, a Venetian musician. The women form a musical duo and book a stage performance, which proves successful. After the show, Doria approaches Lina and says his offer still stands, but she rebuffs him. Soon after the director of the Folies Plastiques hires Lina as the headliner of his new show, she becomes a famous star, with Carmela as her manager. Before a sold-out show, Lina is thrilled when she spots Sergio in a box. After Lina meets Mario Silvani, a famous tenor, a representative for Sergio informs her that he has requested her presence at a party in her honour; she happily accepts.

At the party, Sergio introduces Lina to his friends; unbeknownst to her, Sergio has bet his friends that he could seduce Lina. The two share an intimate moment that night, but are interrupted by his friends. Overhearing their conversation, Lina learns of the bet and that Sergio is about to marry another woman in Russia. Heartbroken, she leaves him.

Lina and Carmela are staying at Silvani's country house outside Paris, where he has been teaching Lina opera singing. Before leaving for Paris, Silvani declares his love for Lina, but says she does not need to give him an immediate answer. In Paris, Silvani arranges for Lina to sing the title role in a production of Puccini's opera Tosca. The conductor turns out to be Doria, who is jealous that Lina is with Silvani.

During the show, Sergio surprises Lina in her dressing room and proposes marriage to her. She announces she intends to marry Silvani, angering Sergio. The next day, during the firing squad scene of Tosca, a contract killer shoots Silvani to death from a balcony, horrifying Lina. The police determine Silvani's murder was premeditated. She continues to perform around the world, now accompanied by Doria.

At the invitation of the Tsar of Russia, Lina and Doria travel to Saint Petersburg. When Lina's train is stopped by a snowfall, she is met by Sergio, who kisses her, but she accuses him of murdering Silvani. Insulted, Sergio leaves. While consoling Lina, Carmela helps her realise that Doria might be a suspect.

As she meets the Tsar and his wife, Lina asks to sing Tosca. Doria objects, but the Tsarina expresses interest in Tosca. During the performance, Sergio leaves, believing that Lina chose Tosca to spite him. As the firing squad scene begins, Doria nervously interrupts the show and confesses to Lina that it was he who had Silvani killed out of jealousy. Lina storms off and goes after Sergio as he is leaving. After she apologises for doubting Sergio, they kiss and leave together.

== Cast ==
- Gina Lollobrigida as Lina Cavalieri
- Vittorio Gassman as Sergio
- Robert Alda as Doria
- Anne Vernon as Carmela
- Tamara Lees as Manolita
- Gino Sinimberghi as Silvani
- Enzo Biliotti as Perret
- Nanda Primavera as Olimpia
- Marco Tulli as judge at the duel
- Nico Pepe as Louis
- Valeria Fabrizi as Silvana
- Annie Cordy (uncredited)

== Release ==
In the United States, the film was acquired by Howard Hughes for distribution by 20th Century Fox. The film was due for release in Boston in early 1957 but was denied a Production Code seal until a love scene was cut.
