= Max et les ferrailleurs =

1971 film by Claude Sautet

- Theatrical release poster
- Directed by: Claude Sautet
- Screenplay by: Claude Sautet; Claude Néron; Jean-Loup Dabadie
- Based on: Max et les ferrailleurs by Claude Néron
- Produced by: Raymond Danon
- Starring: Michel Piccoli; Romy Schneider; François Périer; Georges Wilson
- Cinematography: René Mathelin
- Edited by: Jacqueline Thiédot
- Music by: Philippe Sarde
- Production companies: Lira Films; Sonocam S.A.; Fida Cinematografica
- Distributed by: CFDC (France); Fida Cinematografica (Italy)
- Release dates: 17 February 1971 (France); 12 March 1971 (Italy)
- Running time: 112 minutes
- Countries: France; Italy
- Language: French
- Budget: 4 million francs

Max et les ferrailleurs (English: Max and the Junkmen) is a 1971 crime drama film directed by Claude Sautet, based on the novel of the same name by Claude Néron. The film stars Michel Piccoli and Romy Schneider, with François Périer and Georges Wilson in supporting roles.

== Plot ==
Born into a wealthy family of French vintners, Max is a loner who devoted himself entirely to his obsession: the arrest of criminals. A former judge he is a police inspector and he sees a new band of burglars escape. This failure is still fresh in his mind when he meets Abel who has become a scrap thief and plunders construction sites with a small band of hoodlums around Nanterre. Max plans to encourage them to commit something big and catch them on the spot. Posing as a client, he meets Lily, a young German-born prostitute who is the companion of Abel. He pretends to be the director of a small bank branch which receives significant amounts of money at regular intervals. He ensures the support of his police commissioner. Max fails however to reveal his role as instigator. Gradually, some feeling arises between Max and Lily. But Max keeps a reserved attitude and merely influences the scrap through her. Finally, guessing the band ready for action, he communicates an ideal date to commit robbery. On the scheduled day, the police await them and they are arrested. Later in the police station, Rosinsky (the top cop in the bank's district) reveals to Max that he wants all collaborators brought to justice, including Lily. Distraught, Max tries to save her and ends up threatening Rosinsky. In an argument, Max pulls out his gun and kills him.

== Cast ==
- Michel Piccoli as Max
- Romy Schneider as Lily
- Georges Wilson as Chief Inspector
- Bernard Fresson as Abel Maresco
- François Périer as Rosinsky
- Boby Lapointe as P'tit Lu
- Michel Creton as Robert Saidani
- Henri-Jacques Huet as Dromadaire
- Jacques Canselier as Jean-Jean
- Alain Grellier as Guy Laronget
- Maurice Auzel as Tony
- Philippe Léotard as Losfeld
- Robert Favart as Loiselle
- Dominique Zardi as Baraduch
- Albert Augier as a client of Lily
- Betty Beckers as Maria

== Production ==
After directing two crime films with Classe tous risques (1960) and L'Arme à gauche (1965), director Claude Sautet was about to move on from the crime films when one of his producers suggested him to read the novel Max et les Ferrailleurs by Claude Néron. The novel had been optioned by the Swiss company Sonocam in April 1969, and led to Sautet signing on with the Sonocam to develop it into a film.

Max et les Ferrailleurs was an international co-production between France and Italy with the Paris-based Lira Films, the Genève-based Sonocam and Fida Cinematografica in Rome. The production changed as by March 1970, Sonocam delegated the production to Lira Films while standing in as an associate producer. Fida Cinematografica ultimately contributed 20$ of the 4 million franc budget.

Both Alain Delon and Yves Montand were suggested by producers to play the role of Max while Catherine Deneuve and Marlène Jobert were sought for the role of Lily. Jobert declined to make the film as she did not want to play a sex worker. Romy Schneider ultimately took the role.

Filming began in August 18, 1970 and lasted two months. It was mostly shot in Paris-suburbs with Alfortville and Créteil standing in for Nanterre.

== Release ==
Max et les Ferrailleurs was released in France on February 17, 1971. It had 1,903,243 entries in France, becoming the 16th highest grossing film in France in the annual box office.

It was released in Italy as Il commissario Pelissier on March 12, 1971. It had its first release in the United States as El Paso's Museum of Art and History and later in Los Angeles in 1998.
