= Impasse de la Vignette =

Impasse de la vignette
- Theatrical release poster
- Directed by: Anne-Marie Etienne
- Written by: Anne-Marie Etienne
- Produced by: Alain Keytsman; Michele Renaud-Molnar; Jacqueline Pierreux
- Starring: Annie Cordy
- Cinematography: Jean-Claude Neckelbrouck
- Edited by: Isabelle Dedieu
- Music by: Yves Laferrière
- Production companies: RTBF; Alain Keytsman Production
- Distributed by: Artédis
- Release date: 19 December 1990
- Running time: 107 minutes
- Countries: France; Belgium; Canada
- Language: French

Impasse de la vignette or Un été après l'autre is a 1990 French-Belgian-Canadian comedy-drama film written and directed by Anne-Marie Etienne and starring Annie Cordy.

== Plot ==
Thirty years of the life of a woman. Mother Fine lived impasse de la Vignette in Liège and lived years of grief and drama until her little girl comes to live at her side.

== Cast ==
- Annie Cordy as Mother Fine
- Paul Crauchet as Pa
- Jean-Paul Comart as Francis
- Françoise Bette as Yvonne
- Monique Spaziani as Catherine
- Adrienne Bonnet as Liz
- Jo Rensonnet as Jo Carabin
- Jean-Yves Berteloot as Jeff
- Suzy Falk as Madame Lisa
- Dominique Baeyens as Louise
- Pieter Riemens as Emile
- Gaston Carême as Brother Carabin
- Yvette Merlin as Marutchka
- André Baeyens as Rouquin
- Pierre Laroche as Doctor Van Damme
- Günther Lesage as Arsene
- Olivia Capeta as Anne-Marie
- Fuencisla Carmona as Carmen
- Laurent Ancion as Tony
- Barbara Raskowski as Christiane
- Christophe Leleux as Polleke
- Raphael Bierlaire as Michel
- Armand Eloi as The Monk

== Awards and recognitions ==
Annie Cordy received the Best Actress Prize to the Festivals de Digne et aux Antilles. The film received the Best First Film to the Festival de la Ciotat. In 2015, the film was screened to the "Festival du film francophone d'Angoulême" during a tribute to the Belgian cinema.
