= High Street (film) =

1976 Belgian film by André Ernotte

- Theatrical release poster
- Directed by: André Ernotte
- Written by: André Ernotte; Elliot Tiber
- Produced by: Pierre Drouot; Alain C. Guilleaume
- Starring: Annie Cordy
- Cinematography: Walther van den Ende
- Music by: Mort Shuman
- Release date: August 1976
- Running time: 94 minutes
- Country: Belgium
- Language: French

High Street (French: Rue Haute) is a 1976 Belgian drama film directed by André Ernotte. The film was selected as the Belgian entry for the Best Foreign Language Film at the 49th Academy Awards, but was not accepted as a nominee.

== Cast ==
- Annie Cordy as Mimi
- Mort Shuman as Painter David Reinhardt
- Bert Struys as L'homme
- Guy Verda as Gérard
- Anne Marisse as Sandra
- Elliot Tiber as Mike
- Nadia Gary as Valérie
- Raymond Peira as Le docteur

== See also ==
- List of submissions to the 49th Academy Awards for Best Foreign Language Film
- List of Belgian submissions for the Academy Award for Best Foreign Language Film
