= The Gorillas (film) =

1964 film

- Directed by: Jean Girault
- Written by: Jacques Vilfrid; Jean Girault
- Produced by: Raymond Danon
- Starring: Darry Cowl; Francis Blanche; Bernard Dhéran
- Cinematography: Marc Fossard
- Edited by: Jean-Michel Gautier
- Music by: Raymond Lefevre; Paul Mauriat
- Production companies: Comacico; Les Films Copernic
- Distributed by: Comacico
- Release date: 23 December 1964
- Running time: 88 minutes
- Country: France
- Language: French

The Gorillas (French: Les gorilles) is a 1964 French comedy film directed by Jean Girault and starring Darry Cowl, Francis Blanche and Bernard Dhéran. It was shot at the Billancourt Studios in Paris. The film's sets were designed by the art director Sydney Bettex.

== Cast ==
- Darry Cowl as Edouard
- Francis Blanche as Félix
- Bernard Dhéran as Hubert Loisif
- Michel Galabru as Le contractuel débutant
- Jean Lefebvre as L'électro
- Jess Hahn as Boris, Alexis Alexevitch, le maquilleur
- Jean Le Poulain as Le metteur en scène
- Patricia Viterbo as Claudine Carter
- Maurice Chevit as Le premier contractuel
- Clément Harari as Rha-Thé, l'indou magicien
- Béatrice Altariba as Sylvie Danlevent
- Pierre Doris as Le représentant en vins
- Philippe Dumat as Frank Danlevent
- Robert Dalban as Montecourt, l'entraîneur
- Maria Pacôme as Josépha Dépelouze
- Jacques Seiler as Le valet
- Grégoire Aslan as Maître Lebavard
- Maurice Garrel as La Lame
- Maria-Rosa Rodriguez as Loetitia
- Henri Virlojeux as Le second gardien à la Santé
- Jean Carmet as La Fauche
- Mario David as Bercy
- Gérard Darrieu as Un complice de Lebavard
- Jacques Famery
- Guy Grosso as Un agent cycliste
- Mitsouko
- Michel Modo as Un agent cycliste
- Paul Préboist as L'agent d'Orly
- Pierre Tornade as Un agent de police
- Henri Attal as La Tignasse
- Willy Braque
- Henri Cogan
- Pierre Collet as Le premier gardien à la Santé
- Michel Constantin as Otto, le légionnaire
- Guy Delorme as Le Toulousain
- Pierre Gummay as Franck
- Rudy Lenoir as Lucien
- Maryse Martin as La concierge
- Michel Nastorg
- Jean-Pierre Zola as Van Lédiam

== Bibliography ==
- Philippe Rège. Encyclopedia of French Film Directors, Volume 1. Scarecrow Press, 2009.
