= Bernard Dhéran =

French actor (1926–2013)

- Born: Bernard Yves Raoul Dhéran; 17 June 1926; Dieppe, France
- Died: 27 January 2013 (aged 86); Marrakesh, Morocco
- Occupations: Actor; Voice actor

Bernard Yves Raoul Dhéran (17 June 1926 – 27 January 2013) was a French actor, who was active in film, television and theatre in a career spanning over six decades. Dhéran was well remembered in French cinema's as the French dub of David Niven, Anthony Hopkins, Christopher Plummer, Ian McKellen, and Leslie Nielsen. He was also recognized in dubbing as the voice of Count Dooku in the animated series Star Wars: The Clone Wars, he also dubbed Christopher Lee's performance as Dooku in Star Wars: Episode II – Attack of the Clones and Star Wars: Episode III – Revenge of the Sith.

In 1961, Dhéran was inducted into Sociétaires of the Comédie-Française.

Dhéran died at his home in Marrakesh on 27 January 2013. He was intended to voice Odin in the French dub of Thor: The Dark World, but was replaced with Jean-Pierre Moulin, who also worked in dubbing Anthony Hopkins' roles.

== Selected filmography ==
- The Lame Devil (1948) - Un figurant (uncredited)
- Beauties of the Night (1952) - L'aviateur - Le fiancé de la caissière (uncredited)
- Royal Affairs in Versailles (1954) - Beaumarchais (uncredited)
- The Big Flag (1954) - Lucien Barré
- Napoléon (1955) - Bourrienne (uncredited)
- Men in White (1955) - Clément
- The Grand Maneuver (1955) - Un officier (uncredited)
- If Paris Were Told to Us (1956) - Voltaire jeune
- If All the Guys in the World (1956) - Saint-Savin
- Ce soir les jupons volent (1956) - Bobby un amoureux de Marlène
- La garçonne (1957) - Max Delaume
- Miss Catastrophe (1957) - Fernand
- Le grand bluff (1957) - Serge Colonna
- The Inspector Likes a Fight (1957) - Barat
- Vacances explosives! (1957) - Monsieur Fred
- La peau de l'ours (1957) - Dr. Chauvin
- Quelle sacrée soirée (1957) - L'ami de Denise
- Fumée blonde (1957) - Bernard Hartman
- Vacanze a Ischia (1957) - Pierre Tissot
- It's All Adam's Fault (1958) - Le comte Philippe de Bergen
- Christine (1958) - Le captaine Lansky
- Twelve Hours By the Clock (1959) - Serge (voice)
- Soupe au lait (1959) - René Giquel - Le riche fiancé de Francine
- Rue des prairies (1959) - Le juge d'instruction Moineau
- Le Bossu (1959) - Narrator
- Magnificent Sinner (1959) - Stéphane Ryssakov
- Classe Tous Risques (1960) - Blastone (uncredited)
- Captain Blood (1960) - Récitant / Narrator (uncredited)
- Captain Fracasse (1961) - Chevalier de Vidalenc
- La Belle Américaine (1961) - M. Jean
- The Count of Monte Cristo (1961) - Le procureur Henri de Villefort
- Les Bricoleurs (1963) - L'inspecteur de l'auto-école
- Gibraltar (1964) - Harry Williams
- The Gorillas (1964) - Hubert Loisif
- On Murder Considered as One of the Fine Arts (1964) - Président des rédempteurs de l'assassinat
- How to Keep the Red Lamp Burning (1965) - L'avocat de la partie civile (Lucette) (segment 'Procès, Le")
- Une femme en blanc se révolte (1966) - Le brigadier de gendarmerie
- Le grand bidule (1967) - Morrisson
- L'homme à la Buick (1968) - Martel de la Mothe
- The Young Wolves (1968) - Jean-Noël
- Don't Deliver Us from Evil (1971) - L'automobiliste / Motorist
- Escape to Nowhere (1973) - M.Chat
- Tarzoon: Shame of the Jungle (1975) - Récitant / Narrator (French version, voice)
- The Seventh Company Has Been Found (1975) - Colonel Voisin
- Les princes (1983) - Le mari de Jeanne
- Bernadette (1988) - Docteur Dozous / Doctor Dozous
- Sandino (1991) - Stimson
- Loulou Graffiti (1992) - Duplessis
- Ridicule (1996) - Montalieri
- Stardom (2000) - French Intellectual
- L'antidote (2005) - Salanches de Foiry
- Hunting and Gathering (2007) - Père de Philibert

== French dubbing ==
Christopher Plummer's role in:

- Malcolm X
- Wolf
- Dolores Claiborne
- 12 Monkeys
- A Beautiful Mind
- Nicholas Nickleby
- Syriana
- The New World
- Must Love Dogs
- Inside Man
- The Lake House
- The Imaginarium of Doctor Parnassus
- Beginners

Anthony Hopkins' role in:

- Howards End
- The Remains of the Day
- Shadowlands
- The Mask of Zorro
- Titus
- Mission: Impossible 2
- All the King's Men
- Bobby
- Thor

David Niven's role in:

- Bonjour Tristesse
- The Best of Enemies
- 55 Days at Peking
- Murder by Death
- The Sea Wolves
- Rough Cut
- Trail of the Pink Panther

Ian McKellen's role in:

- X-Men
- X2
- X-Men: The Last Stand
- The Da Vinci Code

Leslie Nielsen's role in:

- Scary Movie 3
- Scary Movie 4
- Superhero Movie

Christopher Lee

- The Hound of the Baskervilles
- Star Wars: Episode II – Attack of the Clones
- Star Wars: Episode III – Revenge of the Sith
- Star Wars: The Clone Wars

== Honors and awards ==
- Chevalier of the Order of the Legion of Honour
- Officer of the Ordre National du Mérite
