= Le Cercle Rouge =

1970 film

- Directed by: Jean-Pierre Melville
- Written by: Jean-Pierre Melville
- Produced by: Robert Dorfmann
- Starring: Alain Delon; Bourvil; Yves Montand; Gian Maria Volonté
- Cinematography: Henri Decaë
- Edited by: Marie-Sophie Dubus
- Music by: Éric Demarsan
- Production companies: Les Films Corona; Comacico; Euro International Films; Fono Roma; Selenia Cinematografica
- Distributed by: Les Films Corona (France); Variety Distribution (Italy)
- Release dates: 20 October 1970 (France); 18 December 1970 (Italy)
- Running time: 140 minutes
- Countries: France; Italy
- Language: French
- Box office: 4,525,820 admissions (France)

Le Cercle Rouge (French pronunciation: [lə sɛʁkl ʁuʒ]; "The Red Circle") is a 1970 French crime film written and directed by Jean-Pierre Melville. It stars Alain Delon, Bourvil, Gian Maria Volonté, François Périer and Yves Montand. The film is known for its climactic heist sequence which is about half an hour in length and has almost no dialogue.

The film's title refers to an epigraph which Melville made up, just as he did in Le Samouraï.

== Plot ==
In Marseille, a prisoner named Corey is released early for good behavior. Shortly before he leaves, a prison warden tips him off about a prestigious jewelry shop that he could rob in Paris. Corey goes to the house of Rico, a former associate who has let him down and with whom his former girlfriend now lives, and forcefully removes money and a handgun from Rico's safe. Then he goes to a billiard hall, where two of Rico's men find him. After killing one, knocking the other out and taking his gun, Corey buys a large American car and, hiding both handguns in the boot, starts for Paris. On the way up, listening to jazz and news on the radio, he encounters a police roadblock.

The same morning, another prisoner, Vogel, who was being taken on a train from Marseille to Paris for interrogation by the well-respected Commissaire Mattei, manages to escape in open country. Vogel is pursued by and eludes Mattei, who orders roadblocks to be set and supervises the manhunt. Meanwhile, Corey, who has understood what this huge police activity is about, stops at a roadside grill in the epicentre of the manhunt, leaving his car boot unlocked. Vogel crosses a stream to send dogs off his scent, reaches the grill, and hides in the boot of Corey's car.

Corey, who has seen him and had been waiting for this, drives off into an open field and tells Vogel he can get out because he is safe. After a tense confrontation where Vogel waves one of Corey's guns, he realizes that Corey has just been released from prison that morning and is trying to save him. The two drive off with Vogel back in the boot. Shortly after, a car with two of Rico's men catches up and forces Corey off the road. They take him into the woods, take his money, and are about to kill him when Vogel, emerging from the boot with the guns, shoots both dead.

Corey takes Vogel to his long vacant flat in Paris where they start to plan the aforementioned robbery. For this they need a marksman to disable the security system by a single rifle shot and a fence to buy the goods. Meanwhile, Mattei is trying to locate the murderer of Rico's men and still trying to recapture Vogel. To do this, he puts pressure on Santi, a nightclub owner who knows most of the underworld, but who refuses to talk.

Corey recruits Jansen, an alcoholic ex-policeman and a crack shot, together with a fence. One long night, Corey, Vogel, and Jansen successfully rob the jewelry shop. However, the fence refuses to take the goods, having been warned off by a vengeful Rico, who had been told inadvertently by the prison warden from the beginning that Corey was on the job.

Overcoming their disappointment, Jansen and Vogel suggest that Corey ask Santi to recommend a new fence. Mattei blackmails Santi using his son —arrested for peddling marijuana— to obtain information about the meeting planned for that night at his nightclub., where Corey is supposed to meet the fence. Mattei, posing as the fence, asks Corey to bring the goods to a country house.

Corey does so, taking Jansen as backup and leaving Vogel at his apartment, who has been given the red rose that Corey had received from the flower girl at Santi's. After Corey arrives at the country house and starts showing the jewels to Mattei, Vogel appears suddenly, presumably acting on his suspicion that Corey was not safe with this new fence, and upon seeing Mattei tells Corey to run with the loot. After a brief, tense confrontation with Mattei, Vogel follows Corey. Jansen, alerted by the gunshots in the mansion's park now filled with police, arrives to stop the pursuers. One after the other, the three men are shot dead by Mattei's officers, who recover the jewels.

== Cast ==
- Alain Delon as Corey
- André Bourvil as Inspector Mattei
- Gian Maria Volonté as Vogel
- Yves Montand as Jansen
- Paul Crauchet as the receiver
- Paul Amiot as Chief of Police
- Pierre Collet as prison guard
- André Ekyan as Rico
- Jean-Pierre Posier as Mattei's assistant
- François Périer as Santi (as François Perier)
- Yves Arcanel as committing magistrate
- René Berthier as Judiciary Police Director
- Jean-Marc Boris as Jean-Marc Santi
- Jean Champion as level-crossing guard
- Yvan Chiffre as a policeman
- Anna Douking as Corey's old girlfriend (as Ana Douking)
- Mireille Darc as the flower girl in Santi's night club
- Stéphanie Fugain as the cigarette girl in Santi's night club
- Robert Favart as Mauboussin's clerk
- Roger Fradet as a policeman
- Édouard Francomme as billiard hall watchman (as Edouard Francomme)
- Jean Franval as hotel receptionist
- Jacques Galland as train conductor
- Jean-Pierre Janic as Paul, Rico's henchman
- Pierre Lecomte as Internal Affairs Deputy
- Jacques Léonard as a policeman
- Jacques Leroy as a policeman
- Jean Pignol as court registry clerk
- Robert Rondo as a policeman

== Themes ==
The film's title means "The Red Circle" and refers to an epigraph which translates as:

Siddhartha Gautama, the Buddha, drew a circle with a piece of red chalk and said: "When men, even unknowingly, are to meet one day, whatever may befall each, whatever the diverging paths, on the said day, they will inevitably come together in the red circle."

Melville made up the quote, just as he did with the epigraph in Le Samouraï.

== Reception ==
=== Release and box office ===
Le Cercle Rouge was released in France on October 21, 1970. It was the fifth most popular film of the year in France.

It was released in Italy as I senza nome (lit. 'The Nameless Ones') on December 18, 1970 with a 122 minute running time. It grossed a total of 1,589,000 lire in Italy becoming the 22nd highest film in year.

=== Critical reviews ===
Vincent Canby, in a 1993 review of a 99-minute version dubbed into English, said the film "may baffle anyone coming upon [Melville] for the first time". According to Canby:

Though severely cut, The Red Circle doesn't exactly sweep along. It has a deliberate pace as Melville sets up the story of three chance acquaintances who plan and carry out the sacking of an elegant, supposedly impregnable jewelry store...Understatement is the method of the film, from Melville's pared-down screenplay to the performances by the three trenchcoated principals, even to the muted photography by Henri Decaë, which is in colour but has the chilly effect of black and white.

Peter Bradshaw, in a 2003 review of a 102-minute reissue, called the film a "treat" and noted "Melville blends the Chandleresque world of his own devising with gritty French reality. With its taut silent robbery sequence, his movie gestures backwards to Rififi, and with Montand's specially modified bullets it anticipates Frederick Forsyth's Day of the Jackal and the contemporary techno-thriller."

Hong Kong director John Woo wrote an essay for the Criterion DVD of Le Cercle Rouge arguing the film's merits. When the film was given a theatrical re-release, Woo was given a "presenter" credit.

Roger Ebert gave the film four out of four in his 2003 review.

The film has a 96% rating at film review website Rotten Tomatoes from 69 reviews, with the critics' consensus stating: "Melville is at the top of his game, giving us his next-to-last entry into the world of deception, crime, and extreme suspense that made him a maestro of the French heist genre."

== Filming locations ==
- Marseille
- Paris
- Montreuil
- The final scene was filmed at the Château of Monthyon, which belonged to the French actor Jean-Claude Brialy

== See also ==
- Heist film
- List of Alain Delon performances
- List of French films of 1970
