= Le Cancre =

- Theatrical release poster
- Directed by: Paul Vecchiali
- Written by: Paul Vecchiali; Noël Simsolo
- Produced by: Thomas Ordonneau; Paul Vecchiali
- Starring: Catherine Deneuve; Paul Vecchiali
- Cinematography: Philippe Bottiglione
- Edited by: Vincent Commaret; Paul Vecchiali
- Music by: Roland Vincent
- Production companies: Dialectik; Shellac Sud
- Distributed by: Shellac
- Release dates: 18 May 2016 (Cannes); 5 October 2016 (France)
- Running time: 116 minutes
- Country: France
- Language: French

Le Cancre is a 2016 French film directed and written by Paul Vecchiali. With this film, Paul Vecchiali shows the story of a man who revisits his past as much as that of a filmmaker who revisits a whole part of French cinema.

== Plot ==
The film follows the adversarial relationship between a father and son, both incurably emotional. The father is haunted by the memory of Marguerite, the great love of his youth, and he lives only in the hope of finding her. The son however is somewhat lost in his life, and later takes the measure of his attachment to his grandfather.

== Cast ==
- Catherine Deneuve as Marguerite
- Paul Vecchiali as Rodolphe
- Mathieu Amalric as Boris
- Édith Scob as Sarah
- Annie Cordy as Christiane
- Françoise Lebrun as Valentine
- Françoise Arnoul as Mimi
- Pascal Cervo as Laurent
- Noël Simsolo as Ferdinand
- Raphaël Neal as Alex
- Pierre Sénélas as Pierre
- Marianne Basler as Suzanne

== Production ==
The film started shooting on 5 October 2015.

== Release ==
The movie was released in 2016. It was nominated at the Cannes Film Festival in 2016.
