= Cigarettes, Whiskey and Wild Women =

1959 film

- Directed by: Maurice Régamey
- Written by: Maurice Régamey; Raymond Caillava
- Starring: Annie Cordy; Pierre Mondy
- Cinematography: Lucien Joulin
- Edited by: Louis Devaivre
- Music by: Henri Betti
- Production companies: Ardennes Films; Donjon Films; Nepi Film
- Distributed by: SIDA
- Release date: 25 February 1959
- Running time: 90 min
- Country: France
- Language: French

Cigarettes, Whiskey and Wild Women (French: Cigarettes, Whisky et P'tites Pépées) is a 1959 French comedy film directed by Maurice Régamey and starring Annie Cordy and Pierre Mondy.

== Premise ==
To bail out their club on the French Riviera, a group of young and pretty sportswomen do not hesitate to exploit whiskey and cigarettes found in the cellar during resounding celebrations.

== Cast ==
- Jean Carmet as Martial
- Annie Cordy as Martine
- René Havard as Fernand
- Pierre Mondy as Max
- Pierre Doris as Gustave
- Franco Interlenghi as Mario
- Reinhard Kolldehoff as Van Dorfelt
- Alessandra Panaro as Micheline
- Sylvie Adassa as Michèle
- Armande Navarre as Juliette
- Nadine Tallier as Arlette
- Micheline Gary as Véronique
- Gisèle Grimm as Élisabeth
- Christian Méry as Angelo
- Arielle Coignet as Isabelle
- Dominique Darsac as Jacqueline
- Pierre Mirat as Abadie
- Jean Richard as The client
- Albert Rémy as The customs
- Pierre Moncorbier as The notary
- Jeanne Valérie

== Production ==
The film was shot from 30 June to 13 August 1958.

The film was released in Italy 10 February 1959, in France, 25 February 1959, in Sweden, 16 November 1959 and in Germany, 4 March 1960.

The film is most known from the 1947 song "Cigarettes, Whisky et P'tites Pépées" ("Cigarettes, Whisky, And Wild, Wild Women" music by Tim Spencer, French lyrics by Jacques Soumet and François Llenas) singing by Annie Cordy.
