= Crime Is Our Business =

- Film poster
- Directed by: Pascal Thomas
- Based on: 4:50 from Paddington by Agatha Christie
- Starring: Catherine Frot; André Dussollier; Claude Rich; Annie Cordy
- Cinematography: Renan Pollès
- Edited by: Catherine Dubeau
- Music by: Reinhardt Wagner
- Distributed by: StudioCanal
- Release dates: 2 October 2008 (Namur); 15 October 2008
- Running time: 109 minutes
- Country: France
- Language: French
- Budget: $14 million
- Box office: $9.9 million

Crime Is Our Business (French: Le Crime est notre affaire) is a 2008 French comedy mystery film directed by Pascal Thomas and starring Catherine Frot, André Dussollier and Claude Rich. It is based on the 1957 Agatha Christie novel 4:50 from Paddington (but with a change of detectives from Miss Marple to Tommy and Tuppence).

== Cast ==
- Catherine Frot as Prudence Beresford (Tommy and Tuppence)
- André Dussollier as Bélisaire Beresford (Tommy and Tuppence)
- Claude Rich as Roderick Charpentier
- Annie Cordy as Babette Boutiti, Prudence's aunt
- Chiara Mastroianni as Emma Charpentier, daughter of Roderick
- Melvil Poupaud as Frédéric Charpentier, youngest son of Roderick
- Alexandre Lafaurie as Raphaël Charpentier, son of Roderick
- Christian Vadim as Augustin Charpentier, eldest son of Roderick
- Hippolyte Girardot as Dr. Lagarde
- Yves Afonso as Inspector Blache
- Valériane de Villeneuve as Mme Clairin
- Marie Lorna Vaconsin as Mme Valois
- Laura Benson as Margaret Brown
- Florence Maury as Diane
