= Henri Salvador =

French singer (1917–2008)

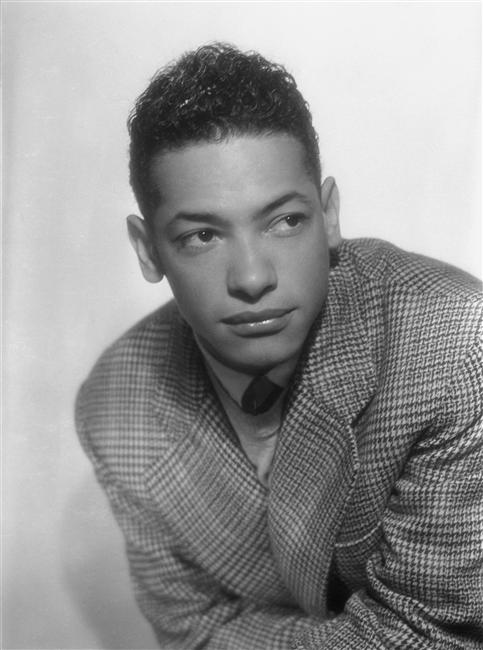
- Salvador in 1946

Background information
- Born: 18 July 1917; Cayenne, French Guiana
- Died: 13 February 2008 (aged 90); Paris, France
- Genres: Jazz; bossa nova; chanson
- Occupations: Singer; musician; comedian
- Instruments: Vocals; guitar
- Years active: 1930s–2008

Henri Salvador (French pronunciation: [ɑ̃ʁi salvadɔʁ]; 18 July 1917 – 13 February 2008) was a French Caribbean singer, comedian and cabaret artist.

== Biography ==
Salvador was born in Cayenne, French Guiana. His father, Clovis, and his mother, Antonine Paterne, daughter of an Indigenous Carib, were both from Guadeloupe, French West Indies. Salvador had a brother, André, and a sister, Alice.

He began his musical career as a guitarist accompanying other singers. He had learned the guitar by imitating Django Reinhardt's recordings, and was to work alongside him in the 1940s. Salvador recorded several songs written by Boris Vian with Quincy Jones as arranger. He played many years with Ray Ventura and His Collegians where he used to sing, dance and even play comedy on stage.

He also appeared in movies including Nous irons à Monte-Carlo (1950), Nous irons à Paris (Jean Boyer's film of 1949 with the Peters Sisters) and Mademoiselle s'amuse (1948).

He is known to have recorded the first French rock and roll songs in 1957 written by Boris Vian and Michel Legrand — "Rock'n Roll Mops", "Rock hoquet, Va t'faire cuire un oeuf, man" and "Dis-moi qu'tu m'aimes rock" — under the artist name of Henry Cording (a play on the word "Recording"). Despite this historical aspect, he never ceased to claim that he disliked rock and roll and even refused to talk about this subject later on.

In the 1960s, Salvador was the host of several popular television variety shows on French TV. In 1964, he scored a hit with "Zorro est arrivé", which was adapted from The Coasters' U.S. hit "Along Came Jones". He is also famous for his rich, catchy laugh, which is a theme in many of his humorous songs. In 1969, Henri Salvador recorded a variation of "Mah Nà Mah Nà" entitled "Mais non, mais non" ("But No, But No" or "Of Course Not, Of Course Not"), with lyrics he had written in French to Piero Umiliani's music.

Henri Salvador and his song "Dans mon île" (1957) were thought to be an influence on Antônio Carlos Jobim in formulating the Brazilian bossa nova style.

Famous Brazilian composer and singer Caetano Veloso made Henri Salvador famous to Brazilian audiences with the song "Reconvexo", in which he says "quem não sentiu o swing de Henri Salvador?" ("who hasn't felt the swing of Henri Salvador?"). Veloso also recorded a version of Salvador's song "Dans mon île".

At the age of 70, Salvador was the voice-over of the crab Sebastian in the 1989 French dubbing of Disney's The Little Mermaid. Recordings of "Embrasse-la" ("Kiss the Girl") can be found on YouTube.

Salvador discovered singers Keren Ann and Art Mengo.

He died of a ruptured aneurysm at his home in the early hours of 13 February 2008. He was 90 years of age. He was buried next to his wife Jacqueline in Père-Lachaise Cemetery.

He was known as a supporter of Paris Saint-Germain F.C. He obtained four seats for life in the Parc des Princes.

== Legacy ==
Henri Salvador continues to be popular today. In 2000, Virgin Records released a CD featuring popular hits such as "Jazz Mediterrannée", which continues to receive regular air play. In 2002, his album Chambre avec vue sold over two million copies. In 2005, Salvador was awarded the Brazilian Order of Cultural Merit, which he received from the acclaimed singer and Minister of Culture, Gilberto Gil, in the presence of President Luiz Inácio Lula da Silva for his influence on Brazilian culture, particularly on bossa nova, to whose invention he contributed. That same year he took 52nd place in the election of Le Plus Grand Français (The Greatest Frenchman).

Salvador became a commander of the French Légion d'honneur and of the French National Order of Merit. In 2007, he released Révérence on V2 Records, featuring Gilberto Gil and Caetano Veloso. He then went on to perform the track "La vie c'est la vie" from that album on an episode of the BBC programme Later… with Jools Holland aired on 4 May 2007.

== Discography ==
- Henri Salvador chante ses derniers succès, Polydor (1955)
- Henry Cording and His Original Rock and Roll Boys, Philips (1956)
- Sous les tropiques, Philips (1957)
- Dans mon île, Barclay (1958)
- Chanté par Henri Salvador, Barclay (1959)
- Salvador s'amuse, Barclay (1960)
- Succès, Philips (1962)
- Henri Salvador, Philips (1963)
- Zorro est arrivé, Rigolo (1964)
- Le travail c'est la santé, Rigolo (1965)
- Henri Salvador, Rigolo (1967)
- Salvador, Rigolo (1968)
- Henri Salvador, Rigolo (1969)
- Chante Boris Vian, Barclay (1970)
- Le Petit Poucet, Rigolo (1972)
- Salvador 77, Rigolo (1977)
- Henri Salvador, Rigolo (1978)
- Salvador/Boris Vian, Rigolo (1979)
- Salvador en fête, Rigolo (1980)
- Henri, Pathé Marconi (1985)
- Des goûts et des couleurs, Pathé Marconi (1989)
- Monsieur Henri, Sony Music (1994)
- Chambre avec vue, Virgin (2000)
- Performance !, EMI (Live album, 2002)
- Ma chère et tendre, EMI (2003)
- Révérence, V2 (2006)
- Tant de temps, Polydor (Posthumous album, 2012)

== Famous songs ==
- "Clopin clopant" (1950)
- "Maladie d'amour" (1950)
- "L'abeille et le papillon" (1954)
- "Je vous'aime" (1955)
- "Blouse du dentiste" (1956)
- "Bonjour sourire" (1956)
- "Le loup, la biche et le chevalier (une chanson douce)" (1957)
- "Adieu Foulard, adieu Madras" (1957)
- "Rock 'n Roll Mops" (1957)
- "Rock Hoquet" (1957)
- "Dans mon île" (1958)
- "Une bonne paire de claques" (1958)
- "Faut rigoler" (1960)
- "À la claire fontaine" avec Christian Chevallier Et Son Orchestre (1962)
- "Le lion est mort ce soir" (1962) ("The lion sleeps tonight")
- "Syracuse" (1962)
- "Minnie petite souris" (1963) ("Pepino the Italian Mouse")
- "Monsieur Boum Boum" (1963)
- "Ma pipe" (1964)
- "Zorro est arrivé" (1964) (parody of "Along came Jones")
- "Le travail c'est la santé" (1965)
- "Juanita banana" (1966)
- "Mais non, mais non" (1969) (parody of "Mah Nà Mah Nà")
- "Fugue en rire" (1970)
- "C'est pas la joie" (1973)
- "J'aime tes g'nous" (1974) (parody of "Shame, Shame, Shame")
- "Ouais" (1978)
- "Blues dingue" (1989)
- "J'ai vu" (2000)

Last hit single / album Chambre avec vue (2001)

Preceded by -M-	Victoires de la Musique; Male group or artist of the year 2001	Succeeded by Gérald de Palmas
