= Bourvil =

French actor and singer (1917–1970)

André Bourvil
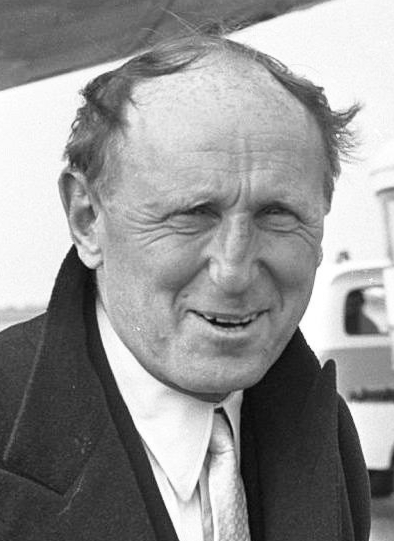
- Bourvil in 1967
- Born: André Robert Raimbourg; 27 July 1917; Prétot-Vicquemare, France
- Died: 23 September 1970 (aged 53); Paris, France
- Occupations: Actor; singer
- Years active: 1941–1970
- Children: Philippe Raimbourg; Dominique Raimbourg

André Robert Raimbourg (French pronunciation: [ɑ̃dʁe ʁɔbɛʁ ʁɛ̃buʁ]; 27 July 1917 – 23 September 1970), better known as André Bourvil (French pronunciation: [ɑ̃dʁe buʁˈvil]), and mononymously as Bourvil, was a French actor and singer best known for his roles in comedy films, most notably in his collaboration with Louis de Funès in the films Le Corniaud (1965) and La Grande Vadrouille (1966). For his performance in Le Corniaud, he won a Special Diploma at the 4th Moscow International Film Festival.

== Early years ==
Bourvil's father was killed in the First World War before he was born. As a result, he spent his entire childhood in the village of Bourville, from which he took his stage name. He married Jeanne Lefrique on 23 January 1943. After a battle with Kahler's syndrome, which attacks the bone marrow, he died at the age of 53. He is buried in Montainville, Yvelines.

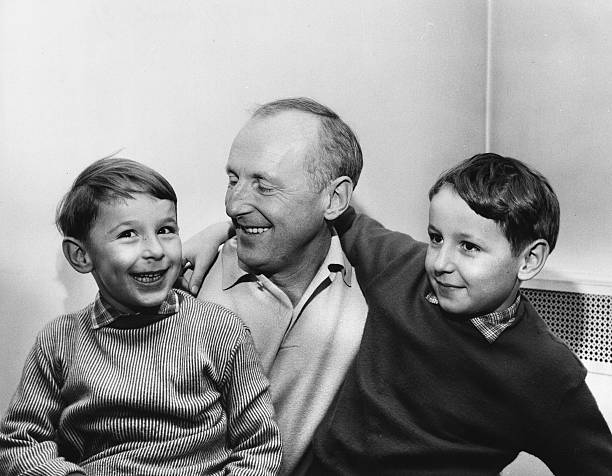
Bourvil with his sons Philippe and Dominique Raimbourg, in 1959

== Career ==
In his comic performances Bourvil principally played roles of gentle and well-meaning characters who were often a bit obtuse or naïve, such as his roles opposite the hyperactive, dishonest and bossy ones played by Louis de Funès. Bourvil's characters not only managed to make viewers laugh, but also to save themselves, often unwittingly, from the Machiavellian designs of his adversaries.

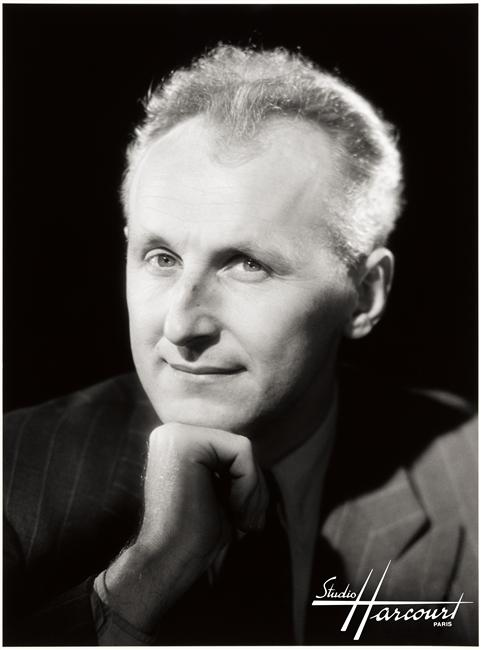
Bourvil in 1951

Bourvil was, however, also capable of more dramatic roles such as the handyman in L'Arbre de Noël (1969). In this role he observes the relationship between a man he works for and the young son who has fallen ill. The audience can identify with the character played by Bourvil, just as they can in his comic roles, so often as a simple man. One can also note his role of Monsieur Thénardier in the film adaptation of Les Misérables (1958), and his penultimate role as the policeman Mattei in Jean-Pierre Melville's Le Cercle rouge (1970).

In March 1948, Bourvil took part in the complete recording of Offenbach's The Tales of Hoffmann with artists of the Paris Opéra-Comique conducted by André Cluytens, playing the four 'servant' roles.

== Filmography ==
- 1942: Sideral Cruises as Scientific (uncredited)
- 1943: Une étoile au soleil
- 1945: La Ferme du pendu as Saddler
- 1946: Not So Stupid as Léon Ménard
- 1947: Le Studio en folie as himself
- 1947: Par la fenêtre as Pilou
- 1948: White as Snow as Léon Ménard
- 1948: The Heart on the Sleeve as Léon Ménard
- 1949: King Pandora as Léon Ménard
- 1950: Miquette as Urbain de la Tour-Mirande
- 1950: The Prize as Isidore Pastouret
- 1951: Mr. Peek-a-Boo as Léon Dutilleul
- 1951: Alone in Paris as Henri Milliard
- 1952: Crazy for Love as Hippolyte Lemoine
- 1953: A Hundred Francs a Second as himself
- 1953: The Three Musketeers as Planchet
- 1954: Royal Affairs in Versailles (directed by Sacha Guitry) as Versailles Museum Guide
- 1954: Poisson d'avril as Émile Dupuy
- 1954: Cadet Rousselle as Jérôme Baguindet
- 1954: Le Fil à la patte as Bouzin
- 1955: Les Hussards as Flicot
- 1956: La Traversée de Paris as Marcel Martin
- 1956: The Singer from Mexico as Bilou
- 1958: Les Misérables (directed by Jean-Paul Le Chanois) as Thénardier
- 1958: Le Miroir à deux faces as Pierre Tardivet
- 1958: Un drôle de dimanche as Jean Brévent
- 1958: Sérénade au Texas as Me Jérôme Quilleboeuf
- 1959: Le chemin des écoliers as Charles Michaud
- 1959: The Green Mare (La Jument verte) as Honoré Haudouin
- 1959: Le Bossu as Passepoil
- 1960: Le Capitan as Cogolin
- 1960: Fortunat as Noël Fortunat
- 1961: Dans la gueule du loup as Drugged Man
- 1961: All the Gold in the World as Dumont and his sons: Mathieu, 'Toine, Martial
- 1961: Le Tracassin ou les plaisirs de la ville ("The Busybody", Alex Joffé) as André Loriot
- 1962: The Longest Day as Alphonse Lenaux, Mayor of Colleville-sur-Orne
- 1962: Tartarin of Tarascon as Priest
- 1962: Un clair de lune à Maubeuge as Television Singer
- 1962: Les Culottes rouges as Fendard
- 1963: Les Bonnes Causes as Albert Gaudet
- 1963: Un drôle de paroissien as Georges Lachaunaye
- 1963: Le Magot de Josepha as Pierre Corneille
- 1963: La Cuisine au beurre as André Colombey
- 1964: La Grande Frousse as Inspector Simon Triquet
- 1965: Le Corniaud (The Sucker) (directed by Gérard Oury) as Antoine Maréchal
- 1965: Le Majordome as True Groom (uncredited)
- 1965: The Dirty Game as Lalande
- 1965: La Grosse Caisse as Louis Bourdin
- 1965: The Wise Guys as Hector Valentin
- 1966: Trois enfants dans le désordre as Eugène Laporte
- 1966: La Grande Vadrouille (directed by Gérard Oury) as Augustin Bouvet
- 1967: Les Arnaud as Le juge Henri Arnaud
- 1968: Les Cracks as Jules Auguste Duroc
- 1968: La Grande Lessive as Armand Saint-Just
- 1969: Le Cerveau (directed by Gérard Oury) as Anatole
- 1969: Monte Carlo or Bust (Gonflés à bloc) (directed by Ken Annakin) as Monsieur Dupont
- 1969: The Christmas Tree (L'Arbre de Noël), (directed by Terence Young) as Verdun
- 1970: L'Étalon (directed by Jean-Pierre Mocky) as William Chaminade
- 1970: Le Mur de l'Atlantique (Atlantic Wall) directed by Marcel Camus as Léon Duchemin
- 1970: Le Cercle rouge directed by Jean-Pierre Melville as Commissioner Mattei
- 1971: Clodo as Gaston (final film role)

== Songs ==
Nearly 300, among which the best known are:

- "La tendresse"
- "Salade de fruits"
- "Les crayons"
- "La Tactique du gendarme" (from the film Le roi Pandore)
- "Ballade irlandaise"
- "Un clair de lune à Maubeuge"
- "Petit bal perdu" (C'était bien)
- "Ma p'tite chanson"
- "Je t'aime moi non plus" (humouristic version), in duet with Jacqueline Maillan

== Honors and awards ==
- Chevalier of the Ordre des Arts et des Lettres (1968)
- Medal of the City of Paris

He declined the Legion of Honour.
