= La bonne du curé =

Single by Annie Cordy

from the album Annie Cordy Show
- Released: 1974
- Recorded: 1974
- Length: 2:42
- Label: CBS Records International
- Songwriter(s): Charles Level

"La bonne du curé" ("The priest's maid") is a song performed by Belgian singer Annie Cordy. The song was written by Charles Level and the music was made by Tony Montoya and Tony Roval. The song was released in France and Belgium on 1974. The song hit the number 1 spot on Belgian and French charts.
