= Last Screening =

- Directed by: Laurent Achard
- Written by: Laurent Achard; Frédérique Moreau
- Starring: Pascal Cervo; Charlotte van Kemmel; Karole Rocher; Austin Morel; Mireille Roussel; Noël Simsolo
- Cinematography: Sabine Lancelin
- Edited by: Jean-Christophe Hym
- Music by: Mikael Barre; Xavier Griette
- Release date: August 9, 2011 (Locarno)
- Running time: 81 minutes
- Country: France
- Language: French

Last Screening (French: Dernière séance) is a 2011 French horror film by Laurent Achard. The film is about Sylvain (Pascal Cervo) who is devoted to the theater, which is about to go out of business. He lives in the basement of the cinema and is the film programmer, projectionist and cashier. Each night after the final screening, Sylvain leaves the theatre to perform brutal acts. The film had its world premiere at the Locarno International Film Festival.

== Release ==
Last Screening had its world premiere at the Locarno International Film Festival on August 9, 2011, where it was shown in competition. It was later shown at the BFI London Film Festival

== Reception ==
Variety gave the film a negative review, stating that the film "plays like a private joke best shared among movie buffs" and that it was "ultimately little more than an accomplished but empty formalist exercise, devoid of the genuine feeling that distinguished Achard's previous, "Demented"." Film4 gave the film a negative review of two stars out of five, stating that the film "is very forgettable. It's a shame that Cervo's great performance hangs limply on a wobbly script full of poor choices." Time Out London gave the film a rating of two stars out of five, calling it "out-and-out preposterous, a soulless essay that's livened by a smattering of striking imagery and a few neat juxtapositions, but nothing to really sink your teeth in to." Screen Daily referred to the film as a "humourless little slasher" and wrote that it was "Neither scary nor engrossing, it is just unnecessarily repetitive."
