= Petite Fleur =

1952 jazz instrumental by Sidney Bechet

Single by Sidney Bechet All Stars
- English title: Little Flower
- B-side: "I Get a Kick"
- Released: 1952
- Recorded: January 1952
- Genre: Jazz
- Length: 3:15
- Label: Vogue
- Composer: Sidney Bechet

"Petite Fleur" is an instrumental written by Sidney Bechet and recorded by him in January 1952, first with the Sidney Bechet All Stars and later with Claude Luter and his Orchestra.

== Chris Barber recording ==
In 1959, "Petite Fleur" was an international hit as a clarinet solo by Monty Sunshine with Chris Barber's Jazz Band. This recording, which was made on October 10, 1956, peaked at No. 5 on the US Hot 100 and No. 3 in the UK charts. Outside the UK, Chris Barber's version was extremely big in Sweden, topping the Swedish best-selling chart for no less than 12 weeks, according to the branch paper Show Business. This version was in A♭ minor, in contrast to Bechet's, which was in G minor.

== Other recordings ==
- There was another recording by Bob Crosby and the Bobcats. Following the Chris Barber instrumental recording, lyrics were added by Fernand Bonifay and Mario Bua in the same year.
- A different set of lyrics was written by Paddy Roberts when the song was recorded by Teddy Johnson and Pearl Carr in 1959.
- Petula Clark recorded the song in French and it was included on her album Hello Paris (1962).
