= Éthiopie =

Single by Chanteurs sans Frontières
- B-side: "Instrumental"
- Released: 1985
- Genre: Pop
- Length: 5:25
- Label: EMI Pathé Marconi
- Songwriter(s): Renaud Séchan; Franck Langolff
- Producer(s): Franck Langolff; Thomas Noton

"Éthiopie" is a charity song recorded in 1985 by the collective band known under the name 'Chanteurs sans Frontières'. The song achieved a huge success in France, topping the chart for two months and becoming one of the best-selling singles in that country.

== Background and writing ==
Chanteurs sans Frontières was a French association founded in 1985 following the English-speaking world model of the bands Band Aid and USA for Africa with the same purpose: providing assistance to victims of the famine then raging in Ethiopia. The association was presided by Antoine di Zazzo, the general director of EMI Pathé Marconi, and was led by Dominique Quiliquini (Renaud's wife), Francis Cabrel (treasurer), Franck Langolff (composer of music) and Rony Brauman (president of Médecins sans Frontières). The idea of a single was found by Valérie Lagrange and under the direction of Renaud.

The song was written by Renaud and the music composed by Franck Langolff. It was produced by Franck Langolff and Thomas Noton.

The total donations reached 23,000,000 francs distributed to various associations : Médecins sans Frontières (90%), AICF, Médecins du monde, and Restos du Cœur.

== Track listing ==
1. "Ethiopie" — 5:25
2. "Ethiopie" (instrumental) — 4:07

== Artists who participated in the song ==
These are the artists who participated in the recordings:

- Jean-Louis Aubert
- Hugues Aufray
- Josiane Balasko
- Daniel Balavoine
- Didier Barbelivien
- Axel Bauer
- Michel Berger
- Richard Berry
- Gérard Blanchard
- Francis Cabrel
- Louis Chédid
- Coluche
- Charlélie Couture
- Hervé Christiani
- Christophe
- Julien Clerc
- Michel Delpech
- Gérard Depardieu
- Diane Dufresne
- France Gall
- Jean-Jacques Goldman
- Richard Gotainer
- Jacques Higelin
- Valérie Lagrange
- Catherine Lara
- Maxime Le Forestier
- Olive, member of the band Lili Drop
- Jeane Manson
- Nicolas Peyrac
- Renaud
- Véronique Sanson
- Alain Souchon
- Diane Tell
- Fabienne Thibeault
- Trust
- Laurent Voulzy

== Charts performances and sales ==
The single went straight to number 6 on the French SNEP Singles Chart, on May 18, 1985. It jumped to number 1 the following weeks and stayed at the top for eight consecutive weeks. After that, the single slowly dropped but remained for 14 weeks in the top ten and 22 weeks on the chart (top 50).

Certified Gold disc by the SNEP in 1985 for 500,000 copies sold.

== Certifications ==
Region	Certification	Certified units/sales
France (SNEP)	Gold	500,000^{*}
^{*} Sales figures based on certification alone.

== Charts ==
Chart (1985)	Peak position
Eurochart Hot 100	19
French SNEP Singles Chart	1
