= Pierre Doris =

French actor and humorist

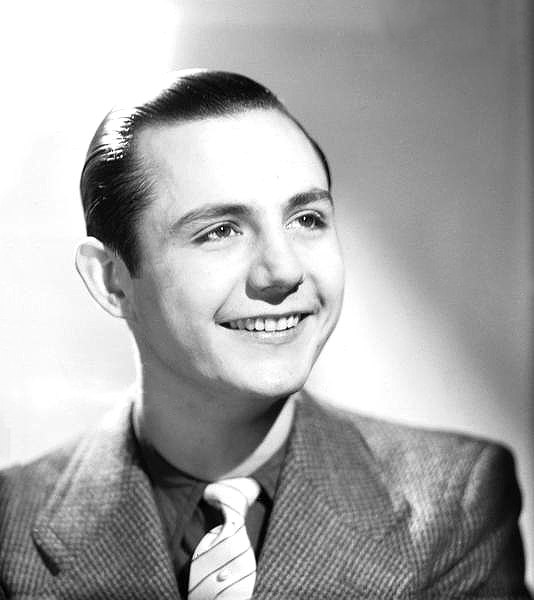
Pierre Doris

Pierre Doris (1919–2009) was a French actor and humorist.

== Selected filmography ==
- Comme un cheveu sur la soupe (1957) - Le chasseur du 'Néant'
- Love Is at Stake (1957) - Le publiciste
- The Tricyclist (1957) - Le voyageur à la deux-chevaux
- En légitime défense (1958) - Le patron de Dora / Adrienne
- Mimi Pinson (1958) - Le présentateur
- Cigarettes, Whiskey and Wild Women (1959, by Maurice Régamey) - Gustave
- The Bureaucrats (1959) - Léonce
- Julie the Redhead (1959) - L'hôtelier / Hotel Manager
- Business (1960) - Papillon
- Fortunat (1960) - M. Dubroc
- The Sahara Is Burning (1961) - Joubert
- Dans la gueule du loup (1961)
- In The Water... Which Makes Bubbles!... (1961) - Le boy-scout camionneur
- L'empire de la nuit (1962) - Le chef du gang des cabarets
- People in Luck (1963) - Sam Chips (segment "Une nuit avec une vedette")
- Le motorizzate (1963) - Lola's Client (segment "La Roulotte Squillo")
- The Bread Peddler (1963) - Le vendeur de journaux
- Le bon roi Dagobert (1963) - Césaric la Crapule
- Cherchez l'idole (1964) - Le disquaire
- L'assassin viendra ce soir (1964) - Inspecteur Bourdier
- Requiem pour un caïd (1964) - Le patron de l'hôtel Monaco
- Clémentine chérie (1964) - Gaston Bellus
- The Counterfeit Constable (1964) - Un français dans le bus
- The Gorillas (1964) - Le représentant en vins
- Déclic et des claques (1965) - Philippe
- La bonne occase (1965)
- Les mordus de Paris (1965)
- Whisky y vodka (1965) - Ivan Gorin Ivanovish, URSS Ambassador
- Le petit monstre (1965)
- Trois enfants... dans le désordre (1966) - L'impresario de zoé
- La Permission (1968) - Peasant / Le paysan
- Bruno, l'enfant du dimanche (1969) - Le chef de la publicité
- Slogan (1969)
- Aux frais de la princesse (1969) - Le préfet
- La guerre des espions (1972) - Le réalisateur
- Le führer en folie (1974) - Colonel
- Mais où sont passées les jeunes filles en fleurs (1975) - L'épicier
- Les petits dessous des grands ensembles (1976) - Le colonel
- Le jour de gloire (1976) - Etienne Machu
- Freddy (1978) - Papa-Gigot
- Si vous n'aimez pas ça, n'en dégoûtez pas les autres (1978) - Un spectateur
- La ville des silences (1979) - Le commissaire
- San-Antonio ne pense qu'à ça (1981) - Bérurier
- Ça va faire mal (1982) - Le vétérinaire
- On n'est pas sorti de l'auberge (1982) - L'homme d'affaires
- Julien Fontanes, magistrat (1983, TV Series, by Serge Friedman) - René Kembs
- Les planqués du régiment (1983) - Le médecin-chef
- On l'appelle Catastrophe (1983) - Frumigaci
- L'émir préfère les blondes (1983) - McGorell
- Les Rois du gag (1985, by Claude Zidi) - Jean
- Dressage (1986) - Le valet
- Le diable rose (1988) - Monsieur Maurice
- Overseas (1990) - Oncle Alban
