= André Ernotte =

Belgian film director

- Born: 3 June 1943; Liège, Belgium
- Died: 8 March 1999 (aged 55); New York City, New York, United States
- Occupations: Film director, screenwriter
- Years active: 1970-1976

André Ernotte (3 June 1943 – 8 March 1999) was a Belgian film director and screenwriter.

== Filmography ==
Year	Title	Role	Notes
1970	Facilités de paiement	Ted Prescott	TV film
1971	The French Connection	La Valle	(final film role)
1976	High Street		Director
