= Serge Leroy =

French director and screenwriter

- Born: 14 May 1937; Paris, France
- Died: 27 May 1993 (aged 56); Paris, France
- Occupation: Film director
- Years active: 1959–1993

Serge Leroy (14 May 1937 – 27 May 1993) was a French film director and screenwriter.

== Selected filmography ==
Film
Year	Title	Notes
1973	Le mataf	
1975	The Track (La Traque)	
1977	The Passengers	
1978	Attention, les enfants regardent	
1982	Légitime Violence	
