= Claude Sautet =

French film director and screenwriter (1924–2000)

- Born: Claude Marie Sautet; 23 February 1924; Montrouge, Hauts-de-Seine, France
- Died: 22 July 2000 (aged 76); Paris, France
- Occupation: Film director

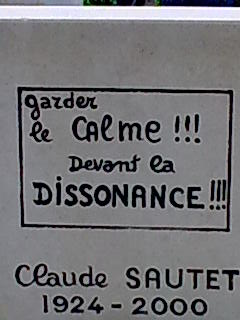
Gravestone of Claude Sautet at Montparnasse Cemetery: Garder le calme devant la dissonance (Keep calm in front of the dissonance)

Claude Marie Sautet (23 February 1924 – 22 July 2000) was a French film director and screenwriter.

He was a chronicler of post-war French society. He made a total of five films with his favorite actress Romy Schneider.

== Biography ==
Born in Montrouge, Hauts-de-Seine, France, Sautet first studied painting and sculpture before attending a film university in Paris where he began his career and later became a television producer. His first movie, Hello Smile! (originally Bonjour Sourire) was released in 1956.

He earned international attention with The Things of Life (Les choses de la vie, 1970), which he wrote and directed, like the rest of his later films. Featuring Michel Piccoli in the male lead, it was shown in competition at the 1970 Cannes Festival. The film also revived the career of Romy Schneider; she acted in several of Sautet's later films. In his next film Max and the Junkmen (Max et les Ferrailleurs, 1971) Schneider played a prostitute, while in César and Rosalie (César et Rosalie, 1972) she portrayed a married woman who copes with the reappearance of an old flame.

Vincent, François, Paul and the Others (Vincent, Paul, François, et les Autres, 1974) is one of Sautet's most acclaimed films. Four middle-class men meet in the country every weekend mainly to discuss their lives. As well as Piccoli, it featured Yves Montand, Gérard Depardieu, and Stéphane Audran. Peter Bradshaw of The Guardian in a 2020 tribute article to Michel Piccoli thought it was "arguably the best" of the "five very well-regarded movies" on which the actor and director collaborated. Sautet achieved even further critical success with Mado (1976).

His film A Simple Story (Une Histoire simple, 1978) was nominated for an Academy Award for Best Foreign Language Film. The film featured Schneider again, this time as a dissatisfied working woman in her 40s. She won the César Award for Best Actress for her performance.

In the 1980s, he made only two films Waiter! (Garçon!, 1983), a drama starring Yves Montand as a middle-aged waiter, and the comedy A Few Days with Me (Quelques Jours Avec Moi, 1988).

Claude Sautet won the Silver Lion at the Venice Film Festival and the César Award for Best Director for A Heart in Winter (Un cœur en hiver, 1992) and received the César once more for Nelly and Mr. Arnaud (Nelly et Monsieur Arnaud, 1995). Both films starred Emmanuelle Béart. Apart from his own directing, he also wrote screenplays for other directors.

Claude Sautet died of liver cancer in Paris on July 22, 2000, and was buried there in the Montparnasse Cemetery.

In 2001, from May 5 to July 14, Canal Plus aired eleven of its feature films in their final versions, following the work done with Béatrice Valbin.

== Filmography ==
Director

- Bonjour sourire (1955)
- Classe tous risques (1960)
- L'arme à gauche (1965)
- Les choses de la vie (1970)
- Max et les ferrailleurs (1971)
- César et Rosalie (1972)
- Vincent, François, Paul et les autres (1974)
- Mado (1976)
- Une histoire simple (1978)
- Un mauvais fils (1980)
- Garçon! (1983)
- Quelques jours avec moi (1988)
- Un cœur en hiver (1992)
- Nelly et Monsieur Arnaud (1995)

Writer

- Les Yeux sans visage (1959), directed by Georges Franju (also first assistant director)
- Symphonie pour un massacre (1963), directed by Jacques Deray
- Peau de banane (1963), directed by Marcel Ophüls
- That Tender Age (1964), directed by Gilles Grangier
- Échappement libre (1964), directed by Jean Becker
- La Vie de château (1965), directed by Jean-Paul Rappeneau
- Mise à sac (1967), directed by Alain Cavalier
- Borsalino (1970), directed by Jacques Deray
- Les Mariés de l'an II (1971), directed by Jean-Paul Rappeneau
- Mon ami le traître (1988), directed by José Giovanni

Other

- Patrick Dewaere (1992), documentary of Marc Esposito
