= Yoko Tani =

French-Japanese actress (1928–1999)

- 谷洋子
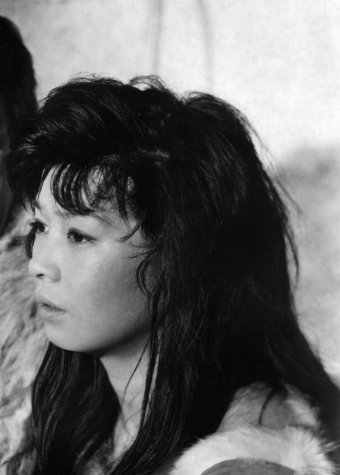
- Tani in a still from The Savage Innocents (1960).
- Born: Yōko Itani; 2 August 1928; Paris, France
- Died: 19 April 1999 (aged 70); Paris, France
- Education: University of Paris
- Occupations: Actress, entertainer
- Spouse: Roland Lesaffre (m. 1956; div. 1962) , Roger Laforet

Japanese name
- Kanji: 谷洋子
- Hiragana: たに ようこ
Transcriptions
- Romanization: Tani Yōko

Alternative Japanese name
- Kanji: 猪谷洋子

Yoko Tani (谷洋子, Tani Yōko; 2 August 1928 – 19 April 1999) was a French-born Japanese actress and nightclub entertainer, who had a career in both Japanese and European cinema during the 1950s and 1960s.

== Early life ==
Tani was born Yōko Itani (猪谷洋子) in Paris in 1928, to Japanese parents Zenichi Itani and Taeko Egi. Her father was an economist, and her mother a longtime associate of Oku Mumeo. Her maternal grandmother, Maseko, served as the model for a famous painting by Kiyokata Kaburagi. Her great-grandfather, Gakusui Egi, was a renowned Confucian scholar and a feudal lord of the Fukuyama Domain.

Tani's parents were both diplomats at the Japanese embassy, with Tani herself conceived en route during a shipboard passage from Japan to Europe in 1927 and subsequently born in Paris the following year, hence given the name Yōko (洋子), one reading of which can mean "ocean-child." Tani would later play a diplomat's daughter in Piccadilly Third Stop (1960). She has occasionally been described as 'Eurasian', 'half French', 'half Japanese' and even, in one source, 'Italian Japanese', all of which are incorrect.

According to Japanese sources, the family returned to Japan in 1930, when Yoko would still have been a toddler, and she did not return to France until 1950 when her schooling was completed. Given that there were severe restrictions on Japanese travelling outside Japan directly after World War II, this would have been an unusual event; however, it is known that Tani had attended an elite girls' school in Tokyo (Tokyo Women's Higher Normal School, currently Ochanomizu University Senior High School), then graduated from Tsuda University, and subsequently secured a Catholic scholarship to study aesthetics at the University of Paris (Sorbonne) under Étienne Souriau.

== Career ==
=== Return to France (1950–1955) ===
Once back in Paris, Tani found little interest in attending university (although by her own account she persevered for two years despite understanding hardly anything that was being said). Instead, she developed a more compelling attraction to the cabaret, the nightclub, and the variety music-hall, where, setting herself up as an exotic oriental beauty, she quickly established a reputation for her provocative "geisha" dances, which generally ended with her slipping out of her kimono. It was here she was spotted by Marcel Carné, who took her into his circle of director and actor-friends, including Roland Lesaffre, whom she was later to marry.

As a result, she began to get bit parts in films—starting as (perhaps predictably) a Japanese dancer, in Gréville's Le port du désir (1953–1954, released 1955)—and on the stage, with a role as Lotus Bleu in la Petite Maison de Thé (French adaptation of The Teahouse of the August Moon) at the Théâtre Montparnasse, 1954–1955 season.

=== Lesaffre and Japan (1956) ===
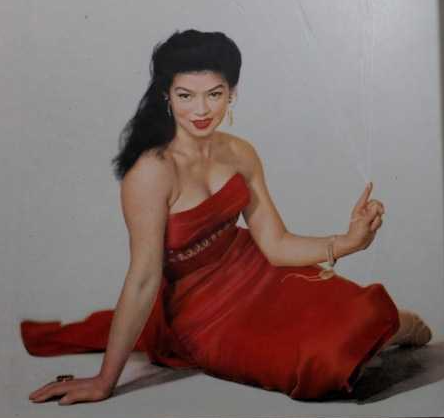
Tani in 1956

Tani's involvement with cinema was, up to the mid-1950s, limited entirely to that of portraying stereotyped orientals in French films. With the end of the US occupation of Japan in 1952, however, postwar Japanese cinema itself burst upon the French scene, culminating in the years 1955 and 1956 when a total of six Japanese films, including Akira Kurosawa's Ikimono no Kiroku (I Live in Fear 生きものの記録), were entered at Cannes. It was at Cannes that Tani first made contact with Kurosawa, and the director Hisamatsu Seiji, contacts which led to a trip to Japan in 1956 by Tani and Lesaffre and their joint appearance in the Toho production Hadashi no seishun (裸足の青春 fr. La jeunesse aux pieds nus), a film about the difficult lives of Catholics in the remote islands off Kyushu, in southern Japan. Tani played the part of a 'fallen woman' who has returned to the islands from Tokyo (where she had run off to become a stripper), and Lesaffre that of the local bishop. It was originally intended that the film be directed by Kurosawa himself, but in the end, it fell to his Toho stable-mate Taniguchi Senkichi. Tani and Lesaffre's ambition was to bring the film back to France and release it in the French market, an aim which was, however, never achieved.

During the same trip, and also for Toho, Tani took a minor role in Hisamatsu's Joshū to tomo ni (女囚と共に), a variant on the "women in prison" theme, in which she played a westernised Japanese Catholic named Marie. This film was notable only in that it starred two veritable legends of the Japanese cinema: Hara Setsuko and Tanaka Kinuyo.

=== International period (1957–1962) ===
Early in 1957, Tani appeared in a small role in her first English-language film: the MGM production of Graham Greene's The Quiet American, a political drama set in French Indochina. Despite being an American production, the film was shot entirely in Rome (with location scenes of Saigon added), with Tani cast as a francophone Vietnamese nightclub hostess.

But Tani's real "break" in English-language cinema came with the 1958 production The Wind Cannot Read. This film, a war-time love story, had originally been a project of the British producer Alexander Korda, and was to have been directed by David Lean, who in 1955 travelled to Japan with author Richard Mason and cast Japanese actress Keiko Kishi as the female lead. Locations were scouted in India, and Ms Kishi (then 22 years old) was brought to England to learn sufficient English for the part. At a very advanced stage, the project fell apart, and a few months later Korda died. The pieces were eventually picked up by the Rank Organisation, and it was decided to produce the film using the script and locations already set out by Lean, with one of Rank's big stars, Dirk Bogarde, in the male lead, Ralph Thomas to direct, and Tani, who was found in Paris, to play the leading female role. The film was a commercial success and one of the top British films of that year, and led to further roles in other British co-productions: as the Inuit Asiak in the Anglo-French-Italian The Savage Innocents (Les Dents du diable) (1959 – nominated for the Palme d'Or at Cannes in 1960), and as the ingénue Seraphina in Piccadilly Third Stop (1960).

Aside from The Quiet American, her only other "Hollywood" roles were in My Geisha (1962, shot on location in Japan) and the Dean Martin comedy Who's Been Sleeping in My Bed? (1963, Paramount Studios Los Angeles).

Despite being type-cast as an exotic, Tani got to play some unusual roles as a result, as evidenced by her portrayal of Japanese doctor/scientist Sumiko Ogimura in the self-consciously internationalist 1959 East-German/Polish film production of Stanisław Lem's novel The Astronauts, Der schweigende Stern (First Spaceship on Venus), and as Ishii Hanako, Japanese common-law wife of the German double-agent Richard Sorge in Veit Harlan's Verrat an Deutschland.

Perhaps even more unusual (for the time) was her trip to Vancouver, Canada in 1962 to play the role of Mary Ota in James Clavell's The Sweet and the Bitter, which treats the aftermath of the wartime internment of Canadian Japanese and the loss of their properties and businesses. Ota, a young Japanese woman, returns to British Columbia after a twenty-year absence to avenge her father's internment-camp death, her hatred directed towards the man who stole her father's fishing boats. Post-production was completed in 1963, but there was no North American release due to legal and financial difficulties. British Lion finally underwrote a showing of the film in London in 1967.

=== Spies, swords and sandals (1963 onwards) ===
1962/63 marked a shift in Tani's career: a return (once again) to France and the definitive end of her marriage to Lesaffre. From this point on she was to be more strictly European-based and to take on work mainly in the low-budget Italian peplum cinema and in femme fatale roles in UK television dramas such as Danger Man and Man in a Suitcase.

Despite her involvement with film, Tani never abandoned her attachment to the nightclub and cabaret. The British producer Betty Box, when looking for the female lead for The Wind Cannot Read (vide supra), wrote:

As Richard [Mason] suggested, it had been extremely difficult to cast the Japanese girl -- we spent months on that, and nearly gave up. We eventually found Yoko Tani in, of all places, a girlie club -- more or less a striptease joint -- in Paris, and we were delighted with Richard's reaction to her.

And, from a 1960s account of the well-known Le Crazy Horse de Paris nightclub:

[Le] Crazy Horse Saloon is a training ground for stars. From first to last the strippers all have names which are likely to crop up in the movies or Parisian social life: Yoko Tani, Rita Renoir, Rita Cadillac, Dodo d'Hambourg, Bertha von Paraboum, etc.

Even as late as 1977, we find her in São Paulo, where she had a small role in Chinese-Brazilian director Juan Bajon's sexploitation film O Estripador de Mulheres:

Yet images of Japanese-Brazilian sensuality, both explicit and potential, were not confined to film: in 1977, Yoko Tani starred in a transvestite show in downtown São Paulo...

Ho Ai Li, Assistant Life Editor of 'The Straits Times', (18/10/'15), quotes Tani as saying, when she was in Singapore, to film Goldsnake:

In Singapore, she told the media: "They told me that Singapore was the Paris of the East, (but) one thing is very different. In Paris, the government has to bribe shopkeepers to smile at visitors. Here, everybody smiles all the time."

== Personal life ==
Tani's 1956 marriage to Roland Lesaffre was childless, and ended in divorce in 1962. Lesaffre claimed in his autobiography Mataf (éditions Pygmalion, 1991), that theirs was the first Franco-Japanese marriage after World War II – conceivably true, but almost impossible to verify.

In later life Tani remarried, wedding Roger Laforet, a native of Binic, Côtes-d'Armor (Brittany). A wealthy industrialist, Laforet was an associate of Baron Marcel Bich, co-founder of the BIC consumer products empire. Tani's last years were spent between Paris and their house in Paimpol overlooking the sea.

== Death ==
Tani died in Paris, from cancer, and is buried in Binic together with Laforet, who predeceased her by six years. Their tomb carries the Breton inscription «Ganeoc'h Bepred» (roughly, "Always With You"). She was survived by her younger sister, Eiko (英子).

== In popular culture ==
Her first name inspired the Belgian comics character Yoko Tsuno by Roger Leloup.

== Film ==
- 1954 (France) : Le port du désir dir. Edmond T. Gréville – unnamed dancer
- 1954 (France) : Les Clandestines dir. Raoul André – unnamed Chinese girl
- 1954 (France) : Ali Baba et les Quarante voleurs dir. Jacques Becker
- 1954 (France) : Women Without Hope dir. Raoul André – unnamed Eurasian
- 1954 (France) : The Babes Make the Law dir. Raoul André – The Lotus Flower
- 1954 (West Germany) : Verrat an Deutschland dir. Veit Harlan – Hanako (Sorge's Japanese common-law wife)
- 1955 (France) : The Price of Love dir. Maurice de Canonge – unnamed dancer
- 1955 (France) : Gueule d'ange dir. Marcel Blistène – Bamboo Flower
- 1955 (France) : Maid in Paris dir. Pierre Gaspard-Huit, released 1956 – unnamed student
- 1955 (France) : À la manière de Sherlock Holmes dir. Henri Lepage
- 1956 (Japan) : 裸足の青春 – Hadashi no seishun / Barefoot Youth dir. 谷口千吉 / Senkichi Taniguchi – Okano Mariko (岡野マリ子)
- 1956 (Japan) : 女囚と共に – Joshū to tomo ni / Women in Prison dir. 久松静児 / Seiji Hisamatsu – Marie (マリー), a prisoner
- 1956 (France) : Mannequins of Paris dir. André Hunebelle – Lotus
- 1957 (France) : The Ostrich Has Two Eggs dir. Denys de La Patellière – la comtesse Yoko
- 1957 (France) : La Fille de feu dir. Alfred Rode – Zélie
- 1958 (Italy) : The Quiet American dir. Joseph L. Mankiewicz – head nightclub hostess
- 1958 (UK) : The Wind Cannot Read dir. Ralph Thomas – Aiko Suzuki (Sabby)
- 1959 (East Germany/Poland) : Der schweigende Stern/Milcząca Gwiazda – The Silent Star/First Spaceship on Venus dir. Kurt Maetzig & Hieronim Przybył – Sumiko Ogimura MD
- 1959 (France/Italy/UK) : The Savage Innocents dir. Nicholas Ray – Asiak
- 1960 (UK) : Piccadilly Third Stop dir. Wolf Rilla – Seraphina Yokami
- 1961 (Italy/France) : Ursus and the Tartar Princess dir. Remigio Del Grosso – Princess Ila
- 1961 (Italy) : Samson and the Seven Miracles of the World – Samson and the Seven Miracles of the World dir. Riccardo Freda – Princess Lei Ling
- 1961 (Italy/France) : Marco Polo dirs. Hugo Fregonese, Piero Pierotti – Princess Amurroy
- 1962 (USA/Japan) : My Geisha dir. Jack Cardiff – Kazumi Ito
- 1962 (Canada) : The Sweet and the Bitter, dir. James Clavell, released 1967 – Mary Ota
- 1963 (USA) : Who's Been Sleeping in My Bed? dir. Daniel Mann – Isami Hiroti
- 1964 (Italy) : Last Plane to Baalbek dir. Hugo Fregonese & Giuliano Carnimeo – Asia
- 1964 (West Germany) : The Secret of Dr. Mabuse dir. Hugo Fregonese – Mercedès
- 1964 (Italy) : Bianco, Rosso, Giallo, Rosa – The Love Factory, dir. Massimo Mida – Yoko
- 1965 (Italy/France) : OSS 77 – Operazione fior di loto dir. Bruno Paolinelli
- 1965 (Italy) : Agent Z-55, Desperate Mission dir. Roberto Bianchi Montero – Su Ling
- 1965 (UK) : Invasion dir. Alan Bridges – Chief of the "Lystrians"
- 1966 (Italy) : The Spy Who Loved Flowers dir. Umberto Lenzi – Mei Lang
- 1966 (Spain/Italy/France) : Goldsnake 'Anonima Killers' dir. Ferdinando Baldi – Annie Wong
- 1967 (Italy) : Le 7 cinesi d'oro dir. Vincenzo Cascino – La giapponese
- 1977 (Brazil) : O Estripador de Mulheres dir. Juan Bajon
- 1978 (France) : Ça fait tilt dir. André Hunebelle – Youyou

== Television ==
- 1960 (UK) : Chasing the Dragon – BBC television (scriptwriter Colin Morris)
- 1961 (UK) : Rashomon – BBC television adaptation dir. Rudolph Cartier – The Wife
- 1961 (USA) : Here's Hollywood – NBC Television; season 1, episode 28 (broadcast 26 April 1961) – herself
- 1962 (USA) : Ben Casey – season 1, episode 27, "A Pleasant Thing for the Eyes" – Aiko Tanaka
- 1963 (UK) : Edgar Wallace Mysteries – episode 31, "The Partner" (based on A Million Dollar Story (1926)) dir. Gerard Glaister – Lin Siyan
- 1964 (UK) : Drama '64 – ITV; episode "Miss Hanago" (broadcast 22 November 1964) – Miss Hanago
- 1966 (UK) : Armchair Theatre – Associated British Corp. – episode "The Tilted Screen" – Michiko
- 1967 (UK) : Danger Man – ITV; season 4, episode 1, "Koroshi" – Ako Nakamura
- 1967 (UK) : Danger Man – ITV; season 4, episode 2, "Shinda Shima" – Miho
- 1967 (UK) : Man in a Suitcase – ITV; episode 5, "Variation on a Million Bucks pt. 1" – Taiko
- 1967 (UK) : Man in a Suitcase – ITV; episode 6, "Variation on a Million Bucks pt. 2" – Taiko
- 1968 (France/Canada) : Les Dossiers de l'agence O – episode 10, "L'arrestation du musicien" – Kikou – la stripteaseuse
- 1971 (UK) : Shirley's World – ITV; episode 12, "A Girl Like You" (UK transmission date 23 June 1972) – Okiyo
- 1972 (France/Quebec) : Le Fils du ciel – ORTF/Télévision de Radio-Canada – Gisèle Lelarge
- 1991 (France) : Série rose (erotic anthology) – FR3; episode "Le lotus d'or" dir. Walerian Borowczyk – Dame Lune

== Theatre ==
- 1954 (France) : Namouna by Jacques Deval – Théâtre de Paris – Sao-Ming
- 1955 (France) : La petite maison de thé adapted by Albert Husson – Théâtre Montparnasse – Lotus Bleu
- 1958 (France) : Chérie Noire by François Campaux, Théâtre Michel – Chérie
- 1965 (UK) : The Professor by Hal Porter, Royal Court Theatre – Fusehime Ishimoto (housemaid)
- 1967 (France) : Une femme à louer by François Campaux, mise en scène Christian Alers, Théâtre de la Potinière
