= Decoin =

Decoin is a French surname. Notable people with the surname include:

- Didier Decoin (born 1945), French screenwriter
- Henri Decoin (1890–1969), French film director, screenwriter and swimmer, father of Didier
