= Maurice Ronet =

French actor (1927–1983)

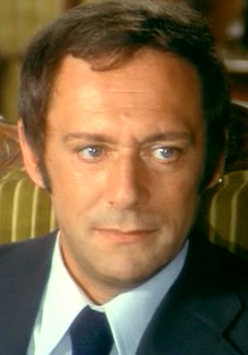
- Ronet in a scene from the Italian film Seduction (1973)
- Born: Maurice Julien Marie Robinet; 13 April 1927; Nice, France
- Died: 14 March 1983 (aged 55); Paris, France
- Education: Centre du Spectacle de la Rue-Blanche; Paris Conservatoire
- Occupations: Film actor, director, and writer
- Years active: 1949–1983
- Spouse: Maria Pacôme (m. 1950; div. 1956)
- Partner(s): Josephine Chaplin (1977 – his death)
- Children: 1

Maurice Ronet (French pronunciation: [mɔʁis ʁɔnɛ]; 13 April 1927 – 14 March 1983) was a French film actor, director, and writer.

== Early life ==
Maurice Ronet was born Maurice Julien Marie Robinet in Nice, Alpes Maritimes. He was the only child of professional stage actors Émile Robinet and Gilberte Dubreuil. He made his stage debut at the age of 14 alongside his parents in Sacha Guitry's Deux couverts in Lausanne. After attending the Parisian acting school Centre du Spectacle de la Rue-Blanche, he entered the Paris Conservatoire in 1944, where Jean-Louis Barrault was one of his mentors. When he made his film debut at 22 in Jacques Becker's Rendez-vous de juillet (1949) in a role that was written specifically for him by Becker, he had little interest in pursuing an acting career.

After completing the film, he married Maria Pacôme (a French stage actress and playwright), and they departed to Moustiers-Sainte-Marie in Provence, where he tried his hand at ceramics. After completing his military service, he returned to Paris in the early 1950s where he took courses in philosophy and physics, and pursued his passion for literature, music (piano and organ), film and painting. His artwork, part of the peinture non figurative movement, was exhibited with friends Jean Dubuffet and Georges Mathieu. He also acted occasionally in small roles in the films of French directors like Yves Ciampi and René Wheeler, with ambitions of becoming a filmmaker himself. Gradually, however, he came to discover a freedom in acting and a creative satisfaction that provided a synthesis of all his interests.

== Career ==
Maurice Ronet became one of European cinema's more prolific actors. Between 1955 and 1975 he appeared in over 60 films. He often portrayed characters who were in conflict with themselves or society. He first garnered acclaim at the 1953 Cannes Film Festival for a supporting role in Jean Dreville's Endless Horizons (Horizons sans fin) and over the next few years as the romantic lead in André Michel's La sorcière (The Blonde Witch/The Sorceress, 1956) and in Jules Dassin's He Who Must Die (Celui qui doit mourir, 1957). It was at the presentation of "La Sorcière" at Cannes where he met a creative and an intellectual counterpart in Louis Malle. Two years later, he made his international box-office breakthrough as Julien Tavernier in Malle's first feature film Elevator to the Gallows (Ascenseur pour l'échafaud 1958), which features Jeanne Moreau. He originated the role of Philippe Greenleaf in Purple Noon (Plein soleil, 1960), René Clément's adaptation of The Talented Mr. Ripley .

Ronet's defining role reunited him with Malle and Moreau in Le feu follet (The Fire Within, 1963). Playing an alcoholic writer, his indelible portrayal of depression and suicide garnered him the highest acclaim of his prolific career. He was awarded France's Crystal Star (Étoile de Cristal) and the prize for Best Actor at the 1965 São Paulo Film Festival; the film also won a Special Jury Prize at the 1963 Venice Film Festival. He also collaborated with Claude Chabrol in four films, including The Champagne Murders (Le scandale, (1966), for which he won the Silver Shell for Best Actor at the 1967 San Sebastián International Film Festival, Line of Demarcation (La ligne de démarcation, 1966) and The Unfaithful Wife (La femme infidèle, 1968). He co-starred with Alain Delon and Romy Schneider in The Swimming Pool (La Piscine, 1969) directed by Jacques Deray.

Other highlights include Jacques Doniol-Valcroze The Immoral Moment (La Dénonciation, 1962); The Victors (Carl Foreman, 1963); Three Rooms in Manhattan (Trois chambres à Manhattan, (Marcel Carné, 1965); Lost Command (Mark Robson, 1966); Il giardino delle delizie (Silvano Agosti, 1967); How Sweet It Is! (Jerry Paris, 1968) starring Debbie Reynolds; Raphaël ou le débauché, (Michel Deville, 1971); Beau-père (Bertrand Blier, 1981) and, one of his final films, Bob Swaim's La Balance, 1982. He was originally cast as Ali in Lawrence of Arabia. However, he was replaced on location by Omar Sharif because of perceived difficulties with his accent.

Ronet made his directorial debut with The Thief of Tibidabo (Le voleur de Tibidabo, 1964), a self-reflexive, picaresque crime story shot in Barcelona, in which he also starred with Anna Karina. He followed it with two documentaries: Vers l'île des dragons (1973), an allegorical journey to Indonesia to film the Komodo dragon and a report on the building of a dam in Cabora Bassa, Mozambique for French television. He directed and produced more programs for television: his own acclaimed adaptation of Herman Melville's Bartleby in 1976 (which was released theatrically in 1978) as well as adaptations of Edgar Allan Poe and Cornell Woolrich stories. He wrote two books: "L'ile des dragons" (1973), a personal recollection and a chronicle of the making of Vers l'île des dragons, and "Le métier de comédien" (1977), an honest and thorough discussion of the acting profession.

== Personal life ==
His marriage to Maria Pacôme quickly ended in a separation, and they divorced in 1956. In 1966 he constructed his home in the village of Bonnieux, Vaucluse, Provence-Alpes-Côte d'Azur. He lived there, and in Paris, with Josephine Chaplin from 1977 until his death; their son Julien was born in 1980. He died in a Paris hospital, of cancer, aged 55. He is buried at the cemetery near his home.

== Selected filmography ==
- Rendezvous in July (1949, director: Jacques Becker) as Roger Moulin
- Great Man (1951) as François
- The Seven Deadly Sins (1952) as Le curé (segment "Luxure, La / Lust")
- Desperate Decision (1952) as Jim
- Endless Horizons (1953, director: Jean Dréville) as Marc Caussade
- La môme vert-de-gris (1953) as Mickey
- Lucrèce Borgia (1953) as Perotto
- Le Guérisseur (1953, director: Yves Ciampi) as André Turenne
- El torero (1954) as Miguel Murillo
- House of Ricordi (1954) as Vincenzo Bellini
- Casta Diva (1954) as Vincenzo Bellini
- Pleasures and Vices (1955) as Gueule d'Ange
- Les aristocrates (1955) as Christophe de Conti
- La Sorcière (1956, director: André Michel) as Laurent Brulard
- Sección desaparecidos (1956, director: Pierre Chenal) as Juan Milford
- He Who Must Die (1957, director: Jules Dassin) as Michelis
- Elevator to the Gallows (1958, director: Louis Malle) as Julien Tavernier
- Carve Her Name with Pride (1958, director: Lewis Gilbert) as Jacques
- That Night (1958, director: Maurice Cazeneuve) as Jean Mallet
- Ce corps tant désiré (1959, director: Luis Saslavsky) as Henri Messardier
- A Girl Against Napoleon (1959, director: Tulio Demicheli) as José
- Purple Noon (1960, director: René Clément) as Philippe Greenleaf
- Il peccato degli anni verdi (1960, director: Leopoldo Trieste) as Paolo Donati
- My Last Tango (1960) as Dario Ledesma
- Les Grandes Personnes (1961, director: Jean Valère) as Philippe
- Le Rendez-vous de minuit (1962, director: Roger Leenhardt) as Pierre Neyris
- Liberté I (1962, director: Yves Ciampi) as Michel
- La Dénonciation (1962, director: Jacques Doniol-Valcroze) as Michel Jussieu
- Portrait-robot (1962) as Gilbert Vitry
- Le Meurtrier (1963, director: Claude Autant-Lara) as Walter Saccard
- Storm Over Ceylon (1963, director: Gerd Oswald) as Dr. Gérard Rinaldi
- The Fire Within (1963, director: Louis Malle) as Alain Leroy
- Casablanca, Nest of Spies (1963, director: Henri Decoin) as Maurice Desjardins
- The Pit and the Pendulum (1964, TV Movie, director: Alexandre Astruc) as Le condamné à mort
- The Victors (1963, director: Carl Foreman) as French Lieutenant
- Les Parias de la gloire (1964, director: Henri Decoin) as Ferrier
- Donde tú estés (1964) as Paul Vallier
- Circle of Love (1964, director: Roger Vadim) as Henri
- The Thief of Tibidabo (1965, director: Maurice Ronet) as Nicolas
- Three Rooms in Manhattan (1965, director: Marcel Carné) as Francois Comte
- La Longue Marche (1966, director: Alexandre Astruc) as Le docteur Chevalier
- Line of Demarcation (1966, director: Claude Chabrol) as Pierre, comte de Damville
- Lost Command (1966, director: Mark Robson) as Captain. Boisfeuras
- Amador (1966) as Amador
- The Champagne Murders (1967, director: Claude Chabrol) as Paul Wagner
- The Road to Corinthe (1967, director: Claude Chabrol) as Dex
- Garden of Delights (1967, director: Silvano Agosti) as Carlo
- Un Diablo bajo la almohada (1968, director: José María Forqué) as Lotario
- Spirits of the Dead (1968) as Récitant (voice, uncredited)
- Birds in Peru (1968, director: Romain Gary) as Rainier
- How Sweet It Is! (1968, director: Jerry Paris) as Phillipe Maspere
- The Unfaithful Wife (1969, director: Claude Chabrol)
- La Piscine (1969, director: Jacques Deray) as Harry
- Delphine (1969, director: Éric Le Hung) as Jean-Marc
- The Scarlet Lady (1969, director: Jean Valère) as François
- Les Femmes (1969, director: Jean Aurel) as Jérôme
- Last Leap (1970, director: Édouard Luntz) as Garal
- La modification (1970) as Léon Delmont
- Qui ? (1970, director: Léonard Keigel) as Serge
- Splendori e miserie di Madame Royale (1970, director: Vittorio Caprioli) as Commissario
- Un peu, beaucoup, passionnément... (1971, director: Robert Enrico) as Didier
- Raphael, or The Debauched One (1971, director: Michel Deville) as Raphaël de Lorris
- The Deadly Trap (1971, director: René Clément) as L'homme de l'organisation
- L'Odeur des fauves (1972, director: Richard Balducci) as Marc Fontemps
- Les Galets d'Étretat (1972, director: Sergio Gobbi) as Kelvo
- Il diavolo nel cervello (1972, director: Sergio Sollima) as Fabrizio Garces
- La Chambre rouge (1972, director: Jean-Pierre Berckmans) as Jean Gerfaud
- Sans sommation (1973, director: Bruno Gantillon) as Raoul Maury
- Don Juan, or If Don Juan Were a Woman (1973, director: Roger Vadim) as Pierre Gonzague
- L'Affaire Crazy Capo (1973, director: Patrick Jamain) as Diserens
- La seduzione (1973, director: Fernando Di Leo) as Giuseppe Lagana
- Commissariato di notturna (1974, director: Guido Leoni) as Vittorio Cazzaniga
- The Marseille Contract (1974, director: Robert Parrish) as Inspector Briac
- Le Cri du cœur (1974, director: Claude Lallemand) as Mathieu, le père d'Alexandre
- Only the Wind Knows the Answer (1974, director: Alfred Vohrer) as Robert Lucas
- La Messe dorée (1975, director: Beni Montresor) as David
- To the Bitter End (1975, director: Gerd Oswald) as Paul Jordan
- Jackpot (1975)
- Perché si uccidono (1976, director: Mauro Macario)
- Oh, mia bella matrigna (1976, director: Guido Leoni) as Luigi
- Golden Night (1976, director: Serge Moati) as Nuit d'or
- À l'ombre d'un été (1976, director: Jean-Louis van Belle) as Claude Landot
- The French Woman (1977, director: Just Jaeckin) as Pierre
- Death of a Corrupt Man (1977, director: Georges Lautner) as Philippe Dubaye
- Bloodline (1979, director: Terence Young) as Charles Martin
- Sphinx (1981, director: Franklin J. Schaffner) as Yvon Mageot
- Beau-père (1981, director: Bertrand Blier) as Charly
- La guérilléra (1982) as Brutus
- Un matin rouge (1982) as Henri
- La Balance (1982, director: Bob Swaim) as Roger Massina
- Surprise Party (1983) as Georges Levesques (final film role)
