= Le Pays d'où je viens =

1956 French musical comedy film

- Directed by: Marcel Carné
- Written by: Jacques Emmanuel; Marcel Carné; Marcel Achard
- Starring: Gilbert Bécaud; Françoise Arnoul; Jean Toulout
- Cinematography: Philippe Agostini
- Edited by: Paulette Robert
- Music by: Gilbert Bécaud
- Release date: 1956
- Running time: 94 minutes
- Country: France
- Language: French

Le Pays d'où je viens (English title: The Country I Come From) is a 1956 French musical comedy film directed by Marcel Carné, starring Gilbert Bécaud and Françoise Arnoul.

== Synopsis ==
Julien, a shy tavern pianist, is secretly in love with Marinette, a waitress. Shortly before Christmas, Éric, a wealthy and charismatic stranger who is Julien's exact double, arrives in town. Éric uses his confidence to bring Julien and Marinette together.

== Cast ==
- Gilbert Bécaud as Julien Barrère / Éric Perceval
- Françoise Arnoul as Marinette Ardouin
- Jean Toulout as Uncle Ludovic
- Claude Brasseur as Roland
- Madeleine Lebeau as Virginie
- Gabrielle Fontan as Churchgoer

== Reception ==
Film historian Edward Baron Turk describes Le Pays d'où je viens as one of Marcel Carné's lighter, more farcical works, though he argues Carné's direction remains as controlled as in his serious films. Turk highlights the film's comic tone, singling out the broad, satirical performances of the uncle character and two detectives, and a playful musical score that includes needle-drops of the overtures to William Tell and Lakmé.

The film features a recurring gag in which two accidental mishaps cause the character Marinette to lose her skirt. François Truffaut criticized the moment as "in the worst of taste for a film that pretends to be charming and pleasant," though Turk writes that the scenes were played with minimal sexism.

Turk also notes that the film reconciles conflicting values found elsewhere in Carné's work, contrasting the two lead characters' differing relationships to marriage and convention, and situates the film's ending — and its title, which translates as "the land from which I come" — as part of this theme.
