= Hal Ellson =

American author

Harold "Hal" Ellson (1910 – October 31, 1994 in Brooklyn) was an American author of pulp fiction whose work primarily focused on juvenile delinquency, a field in which he has been described as "one of the most popular" writers and as "legendary".

Ellson was a social worker, recreational therapist, and nurse's aide at Bellevue Hospital, where he encountered the adolescent psychiatric patients on whom he based much of his fiction; he subsequently stated that many of the patients viewed him as a "father confessor", and eagerly told him their stories while trusting that he would not report them to law enforcement. As a result, Nelson Algren described Ellson's work as "just straight case studies."

Frederic Wertham was an aficionado of Ellson's work, favorably reviewing Ellson's 1949 novel "Duke" in the American Journal of Psychotherapy, and providing an introduction to Ellson's 1950 novel Tomboy; as well, Wertham subsequently cited Tomboy in the first chapter of his own 1954 Seduction of the Innocent.

Mike Shayne Mystery Magazine published reprints of Ellson's short stories such as Walk Away Fast copyright 1956 by Renown Publications, Inc. in its October 1970 issue as well as publishing several of Ellson's original short stories from 1963 to 1981. Ellson's short fiction appeared in Alfred Hitchcock's Mystery Magazine from 1963 to 1983.

Harlan Ellison cited Ellson's work as having inspired his own interest in juvenile delinquency — an interest which led directly to the writing of Ellison's first novel, Web of the City. Ellison also stated that in the earliest days of his career as a writer, he was often mistaken for Ellson writing under a pseudonym — and that decades later, when Ellison had become much more known and Ellson's career had waned, Ellson was often mistaken for Ellison writing under a pseudonym.

== Bibliography ==
- Duke (1949)
- Tomboy (1950) – adapted by Marcel Carné as Wasteland
- The Golden Spike (1952)
- Rock (1953)
- I'll Fix You (1956)
- Tell Them Nothing (1956)
- This Is It (1956)
- Jailbait Street (1959)
- A Killer's Kiss (1959)
- Stairway to Nowhere (1959)
- The Knife (1961)
- Nest of Fear (1961)
- Nightmare Street (1965)
- Games (1967)
- That Glover Woman (1967)
- Blood on the Ivy (1971)
- "hundreds of short stories"

“Reefer Boy”
