= Mouche (unfinished film) =

1992 French film by Marcel Carné

- Directed by: Marcel Carné
- Written by: Didier Decoin; Marcel Carné
- Based on: "Mouche"; 1890 short story by Guy de Maupassant
- Produced by: Antonio Passalia
- Starring: Virginie Ledoyen; Wadeck Stanczak; Roland Lesaffre
- Cinematography: Pasqualino De Santis
- Music by: Michel Legrand
- Production companies: Italfrance Films (France); Alert Film/Von Vietinghoff Filmproduktion (Germany); Filmalpha (Italy); Canal Plus; Conseil régional de Haute-Normandie; Glinwood Films Limited
- Release date: 1992
- Running time: Unknown
- Countries: France; Germany; Italy
- Language: French
- Budget: FRF 52,000,000

Mouche (working title: L'Amour de vivre) is an unfinished French romantic comedy drama film by Marcel Carné, adapted from Guy de Maupassant's short story of the same title, based on a screenplay conceived with Didier Decoin. The production, which halted in 1992 after eight-to-ten days of shooting, was Carné's final work as director.

Though Carné had countless other film projects that were initiated but never completed—including adaptations of The Postman Always Rings Twice and The Castle—and although several were eventually made by others, such as Mary Poppins (1964), Germinal (1963) and La Reine Margot (1954), he considered his failure to make Mouche his greatest disappointment.

Mouche was one of two unfinished projects that Carné had actually begun production on before being abandoned; the other being La fleur de l'âge (1947).

== Premise ==
The original Guy de Maupassant story of "Mouche" centers on a fun-loving group of young boatmen who all fall in love with and share a relationship with the same young woman, nicknamed Mouche. Maupassant's narrator describes her as "a rough sketch of a woman in which there was everything; one of those silhouettes which an artist pens in three strokes on a café tablecloth after dinner between a brandy and a cigarette. Nature sometimes makes a few like that." To avoid strife, the five friends arrange to sleep with Mouche on assigned days of the week. When she becomes pregnant, the men assume joint responsibility and agree to adopt the child communally, but after a miscarriage, they console her by announcing in unison that they will "make [her] another one."

Carné's updating of the material was to feature seven male friends instead of just five:

In my version, there would be seven friends, each sleeping with Mouche on one night of the week. When an eighth joins this group, one of the original seven gives up his day, saying "I am not really interested in women."

A homosexual subplot was introduced in which the man who gives up his day enters a relationship with the newcomer to the group. However, it is this same character who later comforts Mouche and promises to father another child with her:

...when Mouche loses her baby, the only person to console her is the bisexual member of the original group of seven friends. It is he who says, generously, "Don't worry, I'll help you to have another one."

== Cast ==
- Virginie Ledoyen as Mouche
- Wadeck Stanczak
- Roland Lesaffre

== Background and development ==
Marcel Carné first discussed the idea for Mouche in the early 1980s, expressing to his biographer, Edward Baron Turk, his desire to adapt Guy de Maupassant's short story. At that time, Carné had not directed a film in nearly a decade. He gave the project the provisional title L'Amour de vivre, envisioning a colorful tribute to French Impressionism filmed along the Seine near Argenteuil—one that would "bring to life" the paintings of Claude Monet, Édouard Manet and Pierre-Auguste Renoir, just as Jacques Feyder's Carnival in Flanders (1935) had done for the 17th century Flemish masters.

In his 1989 memoir, La Vie à belle dents, Carné wrote that he proposed a film version of "Mouche" to producer Jacques Quintard, with whom he had previously collaborated on La merveilleuse visite (1974). What attracted Carné to Maupassant's story was its originality and the evocative mood it shared with Impressionist painting: "the atmosphere that Monet and Renoir so subtly evoked, the joy of living freely, between the sky and the water, a kind of happiness for all."

In later interviews, Carné explained his intent to recapture the spirit of his debut feature, Nogent, Eldorado du dimanche (1929), a documentary about weekend boaters on the Marne. Anchored in the same milieu, Mouche was designed to evoke the same pastoral France filled with youthful energy, sunshine, and riverbanks. With the film, he aimed to close the circle of his career by returning to the Marne and themes of youth, freedom, and joy.

Despite Carné's directorial prestige, the project struggled to attract consistent funding. By the time the script was finalized, Quintard had withdrawn. Carné then partnered with Italian producer Antonio Passalia, who was eager to work with the director. Additional interest came from German and Italian co-producers. While filming was initially scheduled for September 1991, inadequate preproduction planning led to significant delays. Carné noted that Passalia failed to assemble the crew or finalize production logistics until the last minute, delaying the project by a full year.

Carné's specific visual references for Mouche
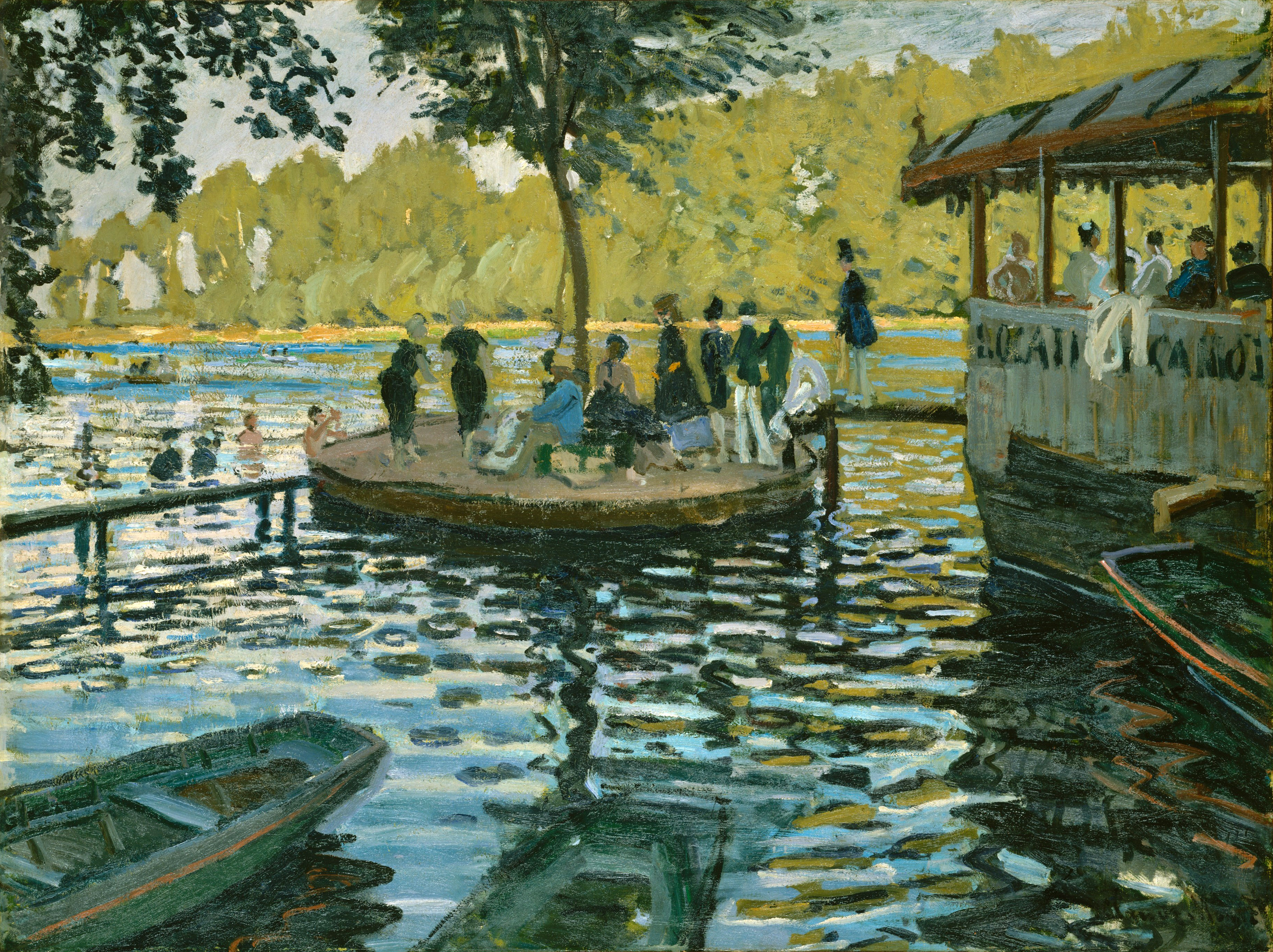
Claude Monet's La Grenouillere

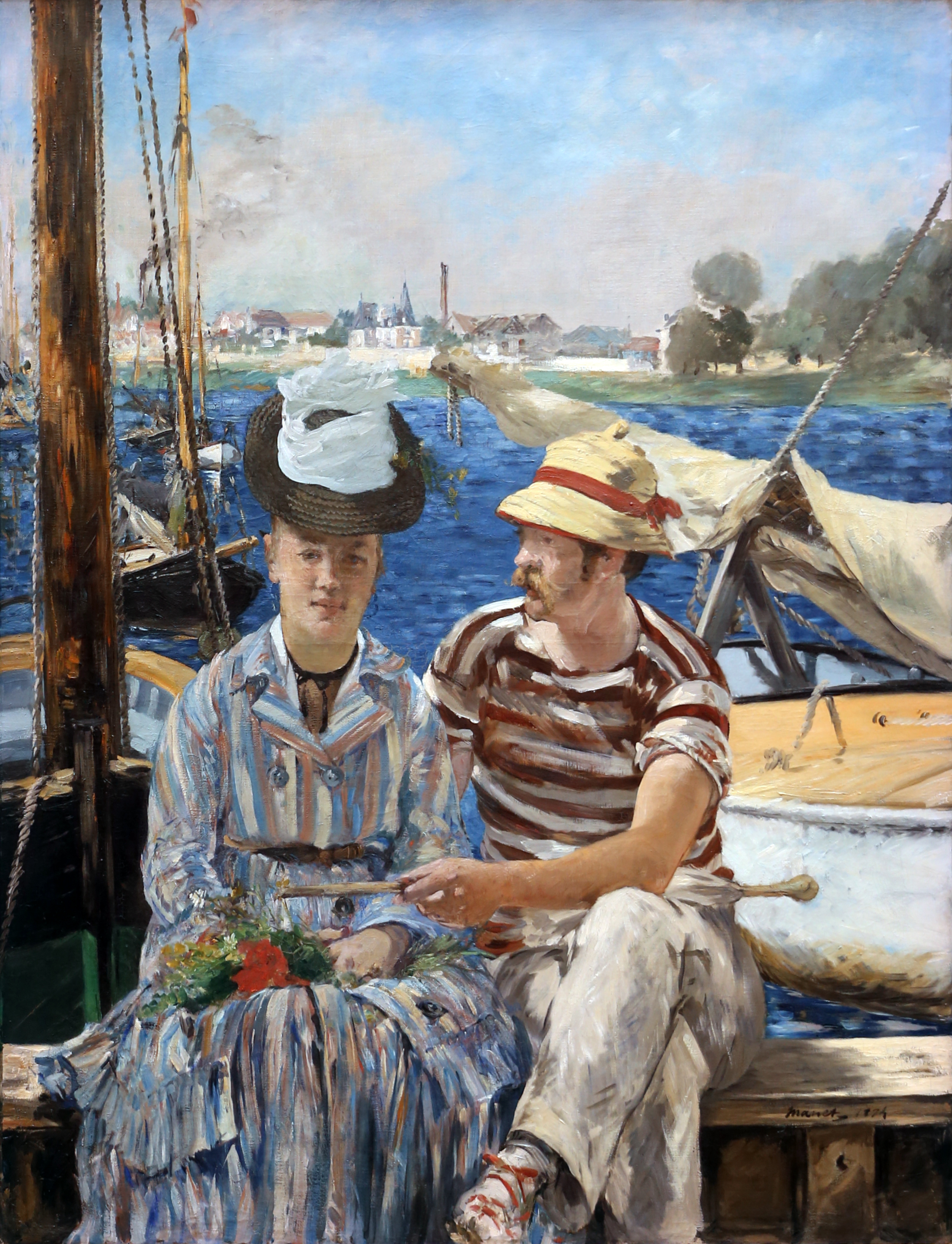
Édouard Manet's Argenteuil

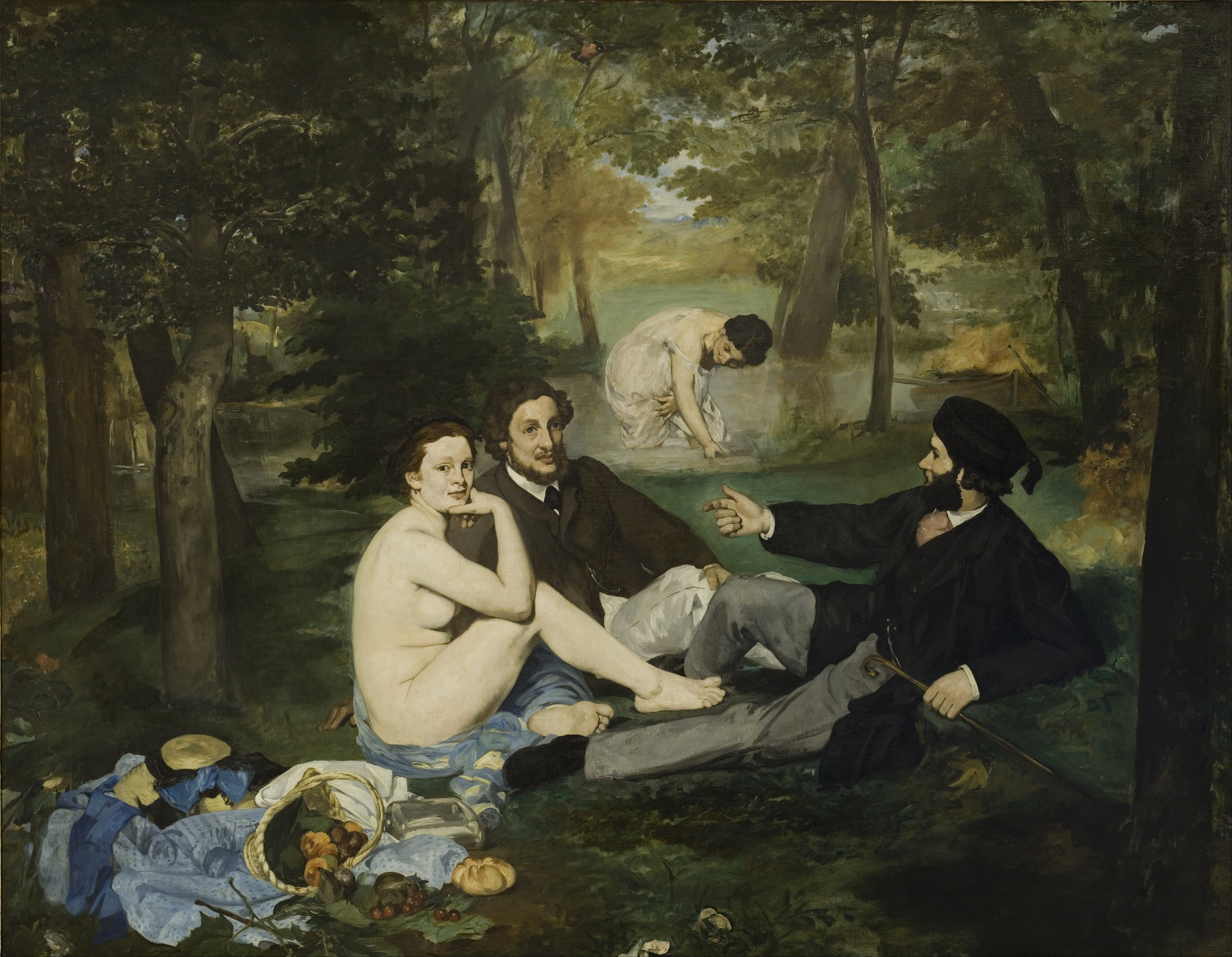
Édouard Manet's Le Déjeuner sur l'herbe

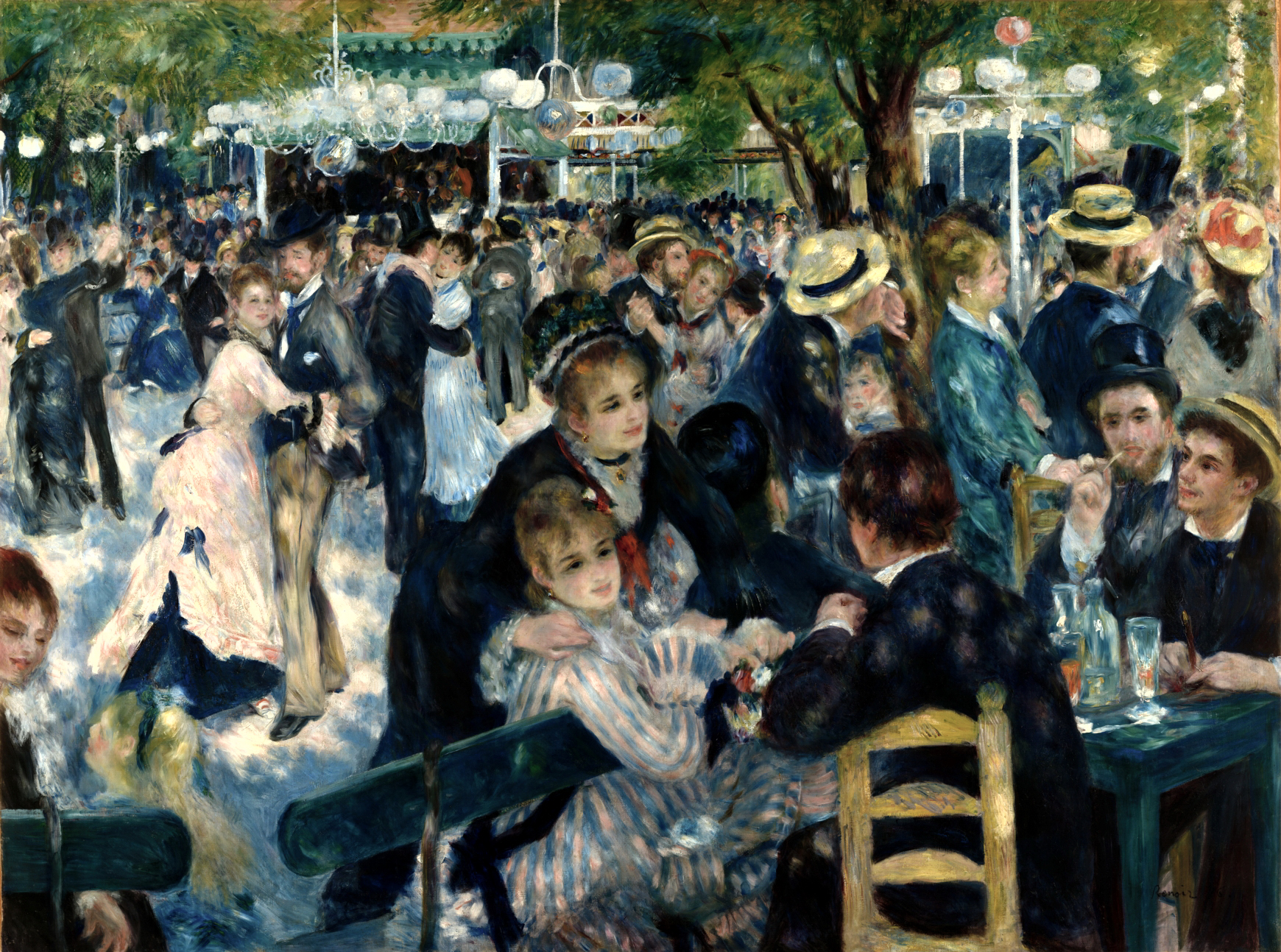
Pierre-Auguste Renoir's Bal du moulin de la Galette

== Production ==
External videos
- Marcel Carné tourne à Guîtres (1:41) 8 October 1992 via INA
- Film "Mouche" de Marcel Carné (1:22) 15 June 1993 via INA

Principal photography finally began in October 1992 in Upper Normandy, near Vernon, where a boathouse set was constructed on the Seine. The film had a reported budget of 52 million. Produced by its three companies—Italfrance Films (FR), Alert Film/Von Vietinghoff Filmproduktion (DE) and Filmalpha (IT)—it received support of €231,723, according to Conseil de l'Europe records. The young Virginie Ledoyen was cast in the title role of Mouche, alongside Wadeck Stanczak and Carné's longtime collaborator Roland Lesaffre. Renowned cinematographer Pasqualino De Santis was brought on to evoke the painterly visual style Carné desired. Set design was led by Mario Garbuglia, Michel Legrand was tapped to compose the score, and costumes were designed by Jacques Fonteray. Filmmaker Franco Giraldi was also allegedly linked to the production, but his exact role remains unclear.

However, just days into production, Carné fell ill with exhaustion and was confined to bed. Although he returned to the set briefly, the production was derailed when unpaid crew members declared an indefinite strike. According to Carné, the bank had frozen the film's credit line, and the producers were unable to meet payroll. After only eight to ten days of filming, Mouche was shut down. A screening of the footage for cast and crew followed the shutdown; Carné was pleased with what he had seen, remarking that it was far from "the spoiled work of an old man."

== Legacy ==
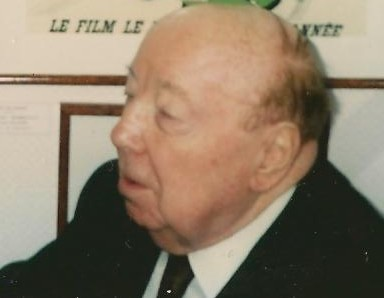
Carné, pictured in 1994, two years after the abandonment of Mouche

Efforts to revive the project were made. Actor/director Robert Hossein had offered to insure the film's completion in the event of Carné's health failing. A new producer, presumably Daniel Toscan du Plantier, showed interest in restarting Mouche but insisted on replacing the cast and crew and restructuring the script. Carné refused, and the new producer ultimately withdrew without explanation.

In the TV documentary Marcel Carné, ma vie à l'écran (1995), filmed in 1994, Didier Decoin asked Carné whether he still believed Mouche was yet to come, to which he replied, "If God allows it, if destiny allows it, if it is my destiny..."

On October 31, 1996, Carné died at the age of 90, leaving the chance of Mouche being revived with another director highly unlikely.

As of 2023, lead actress Virginie Ledoyen, who was 15 at the time when the film began production, described the project as "still unfinished".
