= Ursus and the Tartar Princess =

- Directed by: Remigio Del Grosso
- Written by: Remigio Del Grosso
- Produced by: Nino Battiferri
- Starring: Yoko Tani; Ettore Manni
- Cinematography: Anchise Brizzi
- Music by: Angelo Francesco Lavagnino
- Distributed by: Variety Distribution
- Release date: 1961
- Language: Italian

Ursus and the Tartar Princess (Italian: Ursus e la ragazza tartara, French: La fille des Tartares, also known as Tartar Invasion) is a 1961 Italian-French peplum film written and directed by Remigio Del Grosso and starring Yoko Tani and Ettore Manni.

== Plot ==
The young Polish prince Stephen goes on a mission together with the mighty Ursus, but they are captured by the Tartars.

During the days of his captivity Stefano falls in love with Ilia, a Tatar girl daughter of the chief. But the girl is already promised to the son of the Great Khan, so a duel arises between the two rivals.

The Tartar is mortally wounded, so Ursus, Stefano and Ilia take the opportunity to flee to the Polish camp where a battle soon breaks out, in which Stephen's people win.

== Cast ==
- Yoko Tani as Princess Ila
- Ettore Manni as Prince Stefan
- Joe Robinson as Ursus
- Roland Lesaffre as Ivan
- Maria Grazia Spina as Amia
- Akim Tamiroff as Khan of the Tartars
- Tom Felleghy as Suleiman
- Andrea Aureli as Ibrahim
- Ivano Staccioli as Prince Ahmed
- Gianni Solaro as Polish War Leader
