= The Thief of Tibidabo =

1964 film

- Directed by: Maurice Ronet
- Written by: Rémo Forlani; Juan Marce
- Starring: Anna Karina
- Cinematography: Alain Levent
- Release date: 1964
- Running time: 86 minutes
- Countries: Spain; France
- Language: Spanish

The Thief of Tibidabo (Spanish: La vida es magnífica, French: Le voleur de Tibidabo) is a 1964 Spanish-French crime-comedy film directed by Maurice Ronet and starring Anna Karina.

== Cast ==
- Luis Ciges
- Enrique Herreros
- Anna Karina
- José Nieto
- Jesús Puche
- Maurice Ronet
- Amparo Soler Leal
- Salvador Soler Marí
