= How, When and with Whom =

- Theatrical release poster
- Italian: Come, quando, perché
- Directed by: Antonio Pietrangeli
- Screenplay by: Tullio Pinelli; Antonio Pietrangeli
- Based on: Amour, terre inconnue by Martin Maurice
- Produced by: Gianni Hecht Lucari
- Starring: Philippe Leroy; Horst Buchholz; Danièle Gaubert
- Cinematography: Mario Montuori
- Edited by: Franco Fraticelli
- Music by: Armando Trovajoli
- Production company: Documento Film
- Distributed by: Columbia C.E.I.A.D.
- Release date: 31 July 1969
- Running time: 102 minutes
- Country: Italy
- Language: Italian

How, When and with Whom (Italian: Come, quando, perché, lit. 'How, When, Why') is a 1969 Italian romantic drama film directed by Antonio Pietrangeli, who co-wrote the screenplay with Tullio Pinelli, based on the novel Amour, terre inconnue by Martin Maurice. It is the last film by Pietrangeli, who died drowning in the sea of Gaeta, while he was testing some shots for the next day; he was eventually replaced by Valerio Zurlini.

== Plot ==
Paola, wife of a wealthy Turinese industrialist, meets Alberto, a friend of her husband, who emigrated to Argentina and has returned for business reasons. After a few days, Alberto confesses his love to Paola, but she resists. However, during a vacation in Sardinia, having waited in vain for the arrival of her husband, she gives in to Alberto's wishes. They continue their relationship back in Turin, but she chooses not to follow him to Argentina.

== Cast ==
- Philippe Leroy as Marco
- Horst Buchholz as Alberto
- Danièle Gaubert as Paola
- Elsa Albani as Marco's mother
- Lilli Lembo as Lucy
- Colette Descombes
- Liana Orfei
