= The Air of Paris =

1954 film

- Directed by: Marcel Carné
- Screenplay by: Marcel Carné; Jacques Sigurd
- Based on: La Choute by Jacques Viot
- Produced by: Cino Del Duca; Robert Dorfmann
- Starring: Jean Gabin; Roland Lesaffre
- Cinematography: Roger Hubert
- Edited by: Henri Rust
- Music by: Maurice Thiriet
- Production companies: Del Duca Films; Galatea Film
- Distributed by: Les Films Corona
- Release date: 15 August 1954 (France)
- Running time: 110 minutes
- Countries: France; Italy
- Language: French

The Air of Paris (French: L'air de Paris) is a 1954 French-Italian drama film directed by Marcel Carné and starring Jean Gabin, Arletty and Roland Lesaffre. Gabin won the Volpi Cup at the 1954 Venice International Film Festival. It was shot at the Billancourt Studios in Paris with sets designed by the art director Paul Bertrand.

== Synopsis ==
An aging former boxer who now runs a training gym with his wife is on the prowl to find a young talent and take him to the top. He is in the process of doing so, but his wife wants him to retire. The young boxer's indecisiveness and weakness for women make him a difficult training prospect.

== Cast ==
- Jean Gabin as Victor Le Garrec
- Arletty as Blanche Le Garrec
- Roland Lesaffre as André Ménard
- Marie Daëms as Corinne
- Folco Lulli as Angelo Posi
- Maria Pia Casilio as Maria Posi
- Ave Ninchi as Angela Posi
- Jean Parédès as Jean-Marc
- Simone Paris as Chantal
- Maurice Sarfati as Jojo

== Bibliography ==
- Edward Baron Turk. Child of Paradise: Marcel Carné and the Golden Age of French Cinema. Harvard University Press, 1989.
