= Demarcation line (France) =

Boundary line during World War II

French demarcation line
- Part of Second Armistice at Compiègne
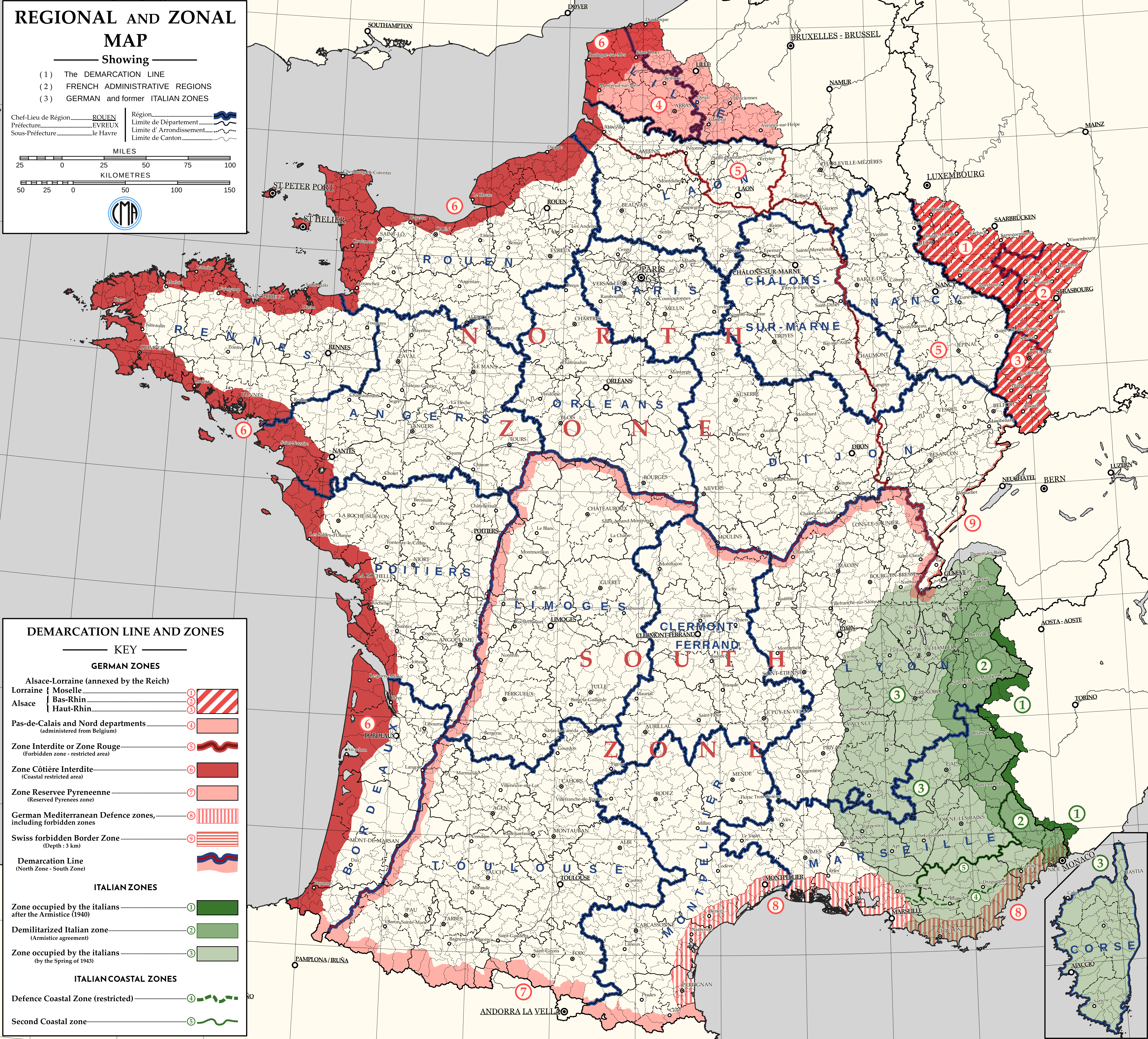
- The demarcation line separated the Free Zone (South) from the Occupied Zone (North).
Date	22 June 1940 – 11 November 1942
Location	forest near Compiègne, France
Territorial changes	Divided Metropolitan France in two: the northern occupied zone and southern Free zone

Parties
Germany	Vichy France

The French demarcation line was the boundary line marking the division of Metropolitan France into the territory occupied and administered by the German Army (Zone occupée) in the northern and western part of France and the Zone libre (Free zone) in the south during World War II. It was created by the Armistice of 22 June 1940 after the fall of France in May 1940.

The path of the demarcation line was specified in the Articles of the Armistice. It was also called the green line because it was marked green on the joint map produced at the Armistice Convention. In German, the line is known as the Demarkationslinie, often shortened to Dema-Linie or even Dema.

Papers were required in order to cross the line legally, but few had this privilege.

The demarcation line became moot in November 1942 after the Germans crossed the line and invaded the Free Zone in Operation Anton. After this, all of France was under German occupation, and the occupied zone north of the line became known as the "northern Zone" (Zone nord) and the former Zone libre became the "southern zone" (Zone sud). The line was officially annulled on 1 March 1943.

== Armistice of 22 June 1940 ==
Article II of the Armistice of 22 June 1940 defines the demarcation line:

To safeguard the interests of the German Reich, French State territory north and west of the line drawn on the attached map will be occupied by German troops. As far as the parts to be occupied still are not in control of German troops, this occupation will be carried out immediately after the conclusion of this treaty.

— Wikisource:Franco-German Armistice

== Establishment ==
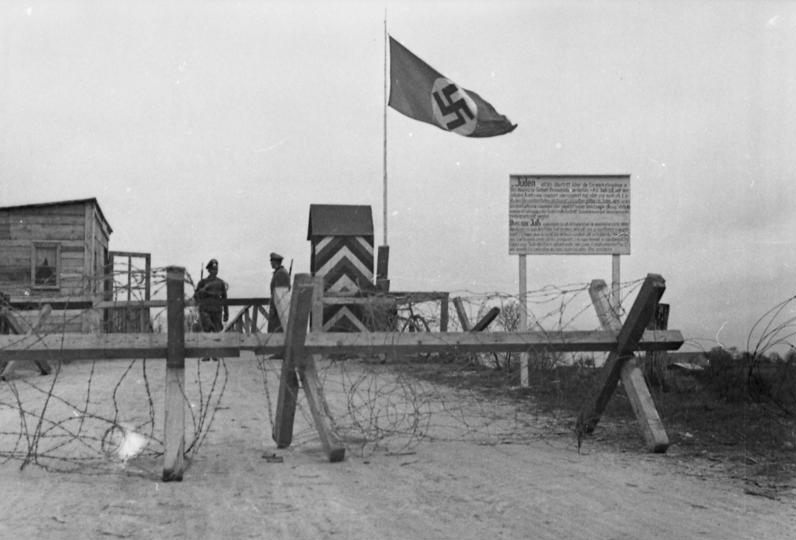
German control post on the demarcation line.

Initially, the armistice of 22 June 1940 provided for the "occupation of territory without giving the French government a free space". The total and rapid defeat of France followed by its partition had not been studied by the German General Staff. Finally this partition, which handicapped the defeated, was decided by the winner. Thus on 22 June 1940 Generals Wilhelm Keitel for Nazi Germany and Charles Huntziger for France signed an armistice which outlined in Article 2 the creation of a partition of the metropolitan area of France. Article 3, however, stated:

"The German Government intends to reduce to a minimum the occupation of the West Coast after the cessation of hostilities with England."

which the French delegation had no power to agree to in any case. This agreement was the basis of a tense political relationship between the two belligerents. The French delegation to the German Armistice Commission at Wiesbaden indicated that this line of demarcation was a violation of territorial sovereignty which had an arbitrary character as much as the line was vague and requests for precision were in vain. If the route seemed simple at the national level, at the departmental and local level uncertainties and inaccuracies were very numerous.

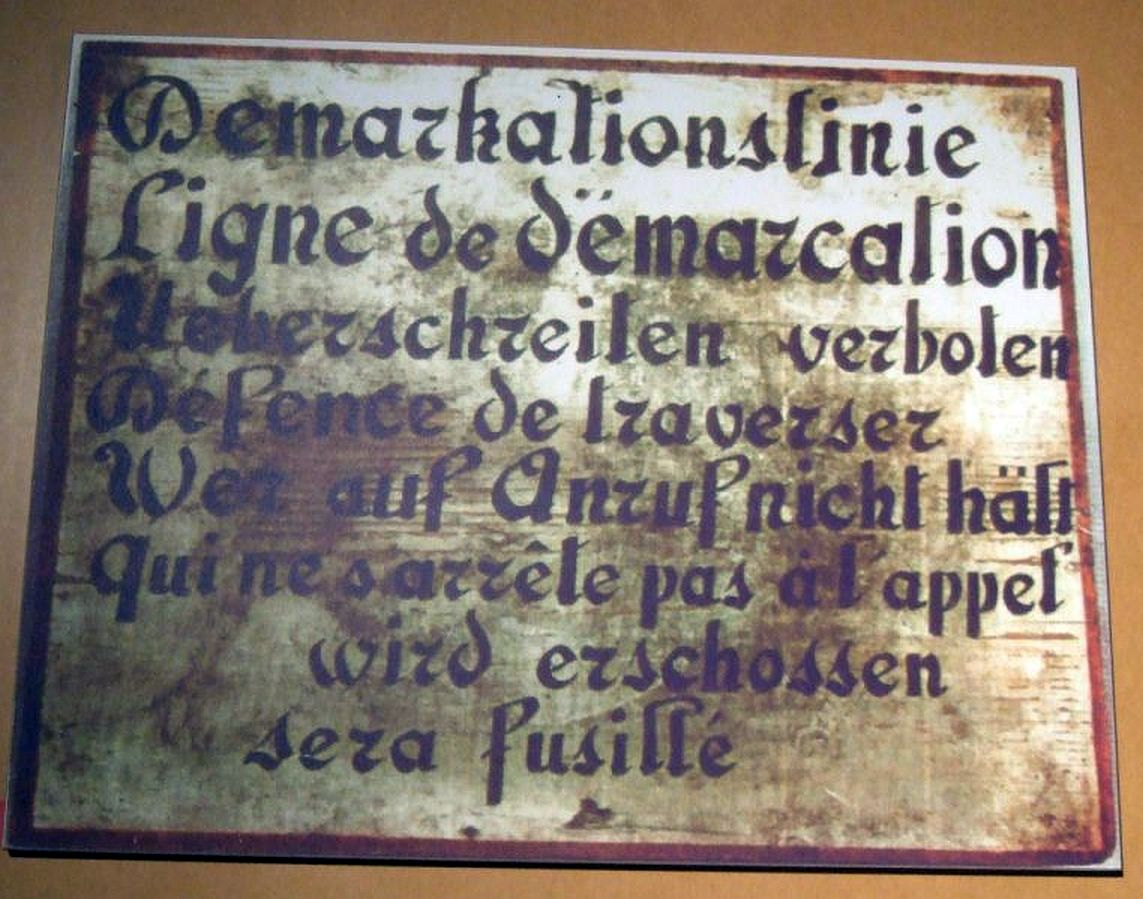
Sign indicating the demarcation line of France (‚Centre d’interprétation de la Ligne de démarcation‚ Génelard)

Vichy France did not know the exact course of the line until the end of 1941. In practice, the occupiers regularly modified the course at the request of local authorities.

From the Swiss border it passed through Dole, Chalon-sur-Saône, Digoin, Paray-le-Monial, Moulins, Vierzon, Angoulême, Langon, Mont-de-Marsan, Saint-Jean-Pied-de-Port before reaching the Spanish border.

Covering nearly 1,200 kilometres (750 mi), the demarcation line crossed thirteen departments: Basses-Pyrénées (Pyrénées-Atlantiques since 1969), Landes, Gironde, Dordogne, Charente, Vienne, Indre-et-Loire, Loir-et-Cher, Cher, Allier, Saône-et-Loire, Jura, and Ain. Out of a total of 90 departments, the German Army occupied 42 entirely, 13 partially, while 35 were not occupied.

== Goal ==
The goal of the demarcation line, according to a German officer, was to make the French government docile: three-quarters of the wheat and coal production in France occurred in the occupied zone, as well as nearly all the steel, textile, and sugar production. While not formally part of occupied Europe, the Free Zone was heavily reliant on Germany.

It was only possible to cross the line legally by obtaining an identity card (Ausweis) or a free-movement card (Passierschein) from the occupation authorities after many formalities. The Vichy Regime did not offer permanent free-movement cards: only Pierre Laval and Fernand de Brinon had this privilege.

== Administrative organization ==
The French bureaucracy had to be reorganized. For example, police stations were created in the non-occupied parts of divided regions.

The disorganization of the country was amplified by other demarcation lines:

- the Northeast Zone: the line which separated Alsace and Moselle (annexed on 18 October 1940) from the Forbidden Zone. See: Alsace-Lorraine, and Gau Westmark;
- the German settlement Zone where the return of refugees was prohibited: including part of Jura, Haute-Marne, Aisne, and Somme and all of Doubs, Haute-Saône, Territoire de Belfort, Vosges, Meurthe-et-Moselle, Meuse, and Ardennes;
- the North Zone under German military administration from Belgium including Nord and Pas-de-Calais;
- a band 50 km (31 mi) wide along the Italian border, bounded by the "purple line" was converted into a demilitarized zone;
- Coastal areas were prohibited from April 1941.

== End of the demarcation line ==
On 11 November 1942, in reaction to the Allied landings in North Africa, the Germans crossed the demarcation line and invaded the Free Zone in Operation Anton. Italy, taking advantage of this invasion, decided to occupy the area it wanted, which led to the extension of the Italian occupation zone. This led in turn to the Scuttling of the French fleet in Toulon and the dissolution of the Vichy Army on 27 November 1942. The demarcation line was removed on 1 March 1943 but fourteen main control points subsisted on the former route of the line.

== Miscellaneous ==
Michelin Maps published a map after the war with the exact route of the line.

The plotting of the demarcation line led to some aberrations. For example, in Indre-et-Loire it ran along the course of the Cher and thus bisected the Château de Chenonceau, which was built on the bed of the river: the main entrance was in the occupied zone, while the exit to the park to the south of the gallery was in the Free Zone.

== Films ==
- The Line of demarcation, a film by Claude Chabrol released in 1966.

== Memorial ==
The interpretation centre of the demarcation line opened in June 2006 at Génelard, a commune in Saône-et-Loire. The permanent exhibition centre is housed in a building whose architecture symbolizes the fracture formed by this inner border. It is located in the Place du Bassin next to the Canal du Centre which served in the summer of 1940 to define the route of the line, near the location of a former German control station which stood on the canal bridge. The line was quickly moved (it was parallel to the canal but a few kilometres away) but the checkpoint remained in the same place. The permanent exhibition shows the history of the demarcation line, both in the department of Saône-et-Loire as well as in the other twelve departments formerly bisected by the line and its influence on the life of France, the functioning of the administration, the development of smuggling, and the French Resistance.

== Bibliography ==
- Éric Alary, The Demarcation Line: (1940-1944), éd. Presses Universitaires de France, collection No. 3045, 1995, 128 p. (ISBN 2-13-047416-0 and ISBN 978-2-13-047416-6).
- Éric Alary, The Demarcation Line: 1940-1944, éd. Perrin, Paris, 2003, 429 p. (ISBN 2-262-01598-8 and ISBN 978-2-262-01598-5).
- Jacques Farisy, The Demarcation Line in Vienne, 1940-1943, Geste Éditions, 2002, 189 p. (ISBN 2-8456-1068-8 and ISBN 978-2-8456-1068-2).
- Jacques Farisy, The Demarcation Line in the department of Charente, 1940-1943, Geste Éditions, 2004, 184 p. (ISBN 2-84561-157-9 and ISBN 978-2-84561-157-3).
- Philippe Souleau, The Demarcation Line in Gironde, Éditions Fanlac, Périgeux.
- Under the direction of Michèle Cointet and Jean-Paul Cointet, Historical Dictionary of France under the Occupation, Tallandier, 2000, 728 p. (ISBN 2-235-02234-0): Michèle Cointet, "Demarcation Line", p. 452-453; Map of Occupied France, p. 716.
- The Second World War 1939-1945, éd. Nov' Edit, p. 74, paragraph "Raid and Deportation".

== See also ==
- Occupation of France by Germany in World War II
