= Underground (1970 film) =

- Theatrical release poster
- Directed by: Arthur H. Nadel
- Screenplay by: Ron Bishop; Andy Lewis
- Story by: Ron Bishop; Marc L. Roberts
- Produced by: Arthur Gardner; Arnold Laven; Jules Levy
- Starring: Robert Goulet; Danielle Gaubert; Lawrence Dobkin; Carl Duering; Joachim Hansen; Roger Delgado
- Cinematography: Kenneth Talbot
- Edited by: Tom Rolf
- Music by: Stanley Myers
- Production companies: Brighton Pictures; Levy-Gardner-Laven
- Distributed by: United Artists
- Release date: October 7, 1970
- Running time: 100 minutes
- Countries: United States; United Kingdom
- Language: English

Underground is a 1970 American war drama film directed by Arthur H. Nadel, written by Ron A. Bishop and Andy Lewis, and starring Robert Goulet, Danielle Gaubert, Lawrence Dobkin, Carl Duering, Joachim Hansen and Roger Delgado. It was released on October 7, 1970, by United Artists.

== Plot ==
During World War II, an American intelligence agent in England, ashamed for having yielded information to the Germans during a previous capture, attempts to redeem himself by contriving his way into a French resistance group, with his ultimate plan being to kidnap a valuable German general and obtain his secrets.

== Cast ==
- Robert Goulet as Dawson
- Danielle Gaubert as Yvonne
- Lawrence Dobkin as Boule
- Carl Duering as General Stryker
- Joachim Hansen as Major Hessler
- Roger Delgado as Xavier
- Alexander Peleg as Moravin
- George Pravda as Menk
- Leon Lissek as Sergeant
- Harry Brooks Jr. as Panzer Sergeant
- Sebastian Breaks as Condon
- Nicole Croisille as Bistro Singer
- Derry Power as Pommard
- Paul Murphy as Jean
- Gerry Sullivan as Fosse
- Eamonn Keane as Emile
- Andre Charisse as Gerrard
- Andreas Malandrinos as Jacquard
- Liam O'Callaghan as Imhoff
- David Leland as Paul
- Robert Vincent Smith as Sentry
- Martin Crosbie as RAF Sergeant
- Jim Bartley as First Maquis
- Gerry Alexander as Second Maquis
- Chris O'Neill as Aid Man
- Bill Golding as German Staff Sergeant
- Fred Meany as Enlisted Man
- Stephen Follett as Boy in Church
- Maura Keeley as Mother
- Frank Hayden as Motorcycle Lieutenant
- Bob Carlile as Corporal
- Conor Evans as German Officer in Church
- Brendan Matthews as German Officer
- Joe Pilkington as Enlisted Man
- Barry Cowan as First Radarman
- Jeremy Jones as Second Radarman
- with various roles dubbed by Robert Rietty

Michael Whelan (German Military Bandsman)

== Production ==
Many of the scenes set in England were actually filmed in the Republic of Ireland, in the town of Enniscorthy. Buildings seen in the film included St Aidan's Cathedral, Enniscorthy railway station, Lett's Brewery, Abbey Square and the rowing club boathouse.

== See also ==
- List of American films of 1970
