= The Savage Innocents =

1960 film by Nicholas Ray

- Directed by: Nicholas Ray
- Screenplay by: Nicholas Ray; Hans Ruesch (adaptation); Franco Solinas (adaptation)
- Based on: Top of the World by Hans Ruesch
- Produced by: Maleno Malenotti; Joseph Janni
- Starring: Anthony Quinn; Yoko Tani
- Cinematography: Peter Hennessy; Aldo Tonti
- Edited by: Eraldo Da Roma; Ralph Kemplen; Jolanda Benvenuti
- Music by: Angelo Francesco Lavagnino
- Production companies: Société Nouvelle Pathé Cinéma (as Gray Film-Pathé); Appia Films Ltd. (as Appia Film); Gray Films; Magic Film
- Distributed by: The Rank Organization (United Kingdom); Paramount Pictures (United States)
- Release date: May 1960
- Running time: 110 minutes
- Countries: Italy; United Kingdom; France
- Language: English
- Budget: $1,500,000

The Savage Innocents is a 1960 adventure film directed and co-written by Nicholas Ray. Anthony Quinn and Yoko Tani star, with Lee Montague, Marco Guglielmi, Carlo Giustini, Anthony Chinn, and Michael Chow in supporting roles, alongside Peter O' Toole in an early film role. It was adapted from the novel Top of the World by Swiss writer Hans Ruesch.

The film was an international co-production, with British, Italian and French interests involved; in the United States it was released by Paramount Pictures. The film was shot on-location in the Canadian Arctic, Kayak scenes were shot in Ilulissat, Greenland, with interiors shot in Britain's Pinewood Studios and in Rome's Cinecittà studios. It was entered in the 1960 Cannes Film Festival. The film's themes include Inuit survival in the extreme arctic wilderness, as well as their raw existence and struggle to maintain their lifestyle against encroaching civilization.

== Plot ==
An Inuk hunter kills a Christian missionary who rejects his traditional offer of food and his wife's company. Pursued by white policemen, the Inuk saves the life of one of them, resulting in a final confrontation in which the surviving cop must decide between his commitment to law enforcement and his gratitude to the Inuk.

== Cast ==
- Anthony Quinn as Inuk
- Yoko Tani as Asiak
  - Nikki van der Zyl as Asiak's voice (uncredited)
- Peter O'Toole as the First Trooper
  - Robert Rietti as the First Trooper's voice (uncredited)
- Carlo Giustini as the Second Trooper
- Lee Montague as Ittimargnek
- Marco Guglielmi as the Missionary
- Anna Wong as Hiko
- Kaida Horiuchi as Imina
- Anthony Chinn as Kiddok
- Michael Chow as Undik
- Marie Yang as Powtee
- Andy Ho as Anarvik
- Yvonne Shima as Lulik
- Francis de Wolff as Trader

== Production ==
The movie was based on a best selling book by Hans Ruesch which sold more than two million copies. Film rights were obtained by Italian producer Maleno Malenotti, who attracted some interest at Paramount and met with Nicholas Ray. Ray wrote a script and Anthony Quinn agreed to play the lead. Finance was raised from Italy, Paramount in the US and Rank in Britain, each country investing around a third of the $1.5 million budget.

Ray cast a Japanese and Chinese female actors as eskimos - Yoko Tani, who had been in The Wind Cannot Read, and Anna Mae Wong. Ray later said, "I couldn’t find an Eskimo actress, and I was convinced of the theory that certain tribes migrated north-eastward into China, crossed the Bering Straits and travelled down through North America — it makes for a great deal of similarity between oriental peoples and Eskimos."

Filming started June 1959 and took place at Pinewood Studios in England. Location footage shot in Canada over three weeks was lost in a plane crash. These scenes had to be refilmed in a studio in London.

Ray said, "I had written all the Eskimo dialogue in beautiful, fluent, poetic language, and I thought that Yoko would be able to read it without accent. But when they began playing, Quinn found that he couldn’t adjust to Yoko’s rhythm without using pidgin English. I should have recast, or at least determined to dub. But I made concessions to the pidgin English."

Peter O'Toole's voice was dubbed by that of an Italian actor, Robert Rietti. This upset O'Toole who demanded he not be credited.

The original script had a third act in a courtroom but this was greatly truncated.

== Release ==
Release of the film was delayed in North America due to uncertainty how to market it.

== Reception ==
=== Critical ===
Variety called it "a strange offbeat drama which will need some careful putting over to tease the run-of-mill patrons" but praised the art direction and photography.

Eugene Archer gave the film a mixed review in The New York Times upon its 1961 release: "Most of the qualities that have made Nicholas Ray one of America's most highly praised directors abroad while leaving him relatively unpopular and unknown at home are clearly apparent in 'The Savage Innocents.'" Describing the movie as "badly cut" and "a bitter drama," Archer nonetheless found that "Mr. Ray's highly individualistic preoccupation with moral tensions expresses itself in a series of unusually provocative scenes" and concluded that this "strange, disturbing drama will leave most of its viewers dissatisfied and some outraged, but few will remain indifferent."

FilmInk argued "like a lot of Ray movies is full of interesting stuff and numerous flaws, most notably a patronising view of eskimos and some atrocious dubbing of Peter O’Toole, who plays a mountie. The film actually made a bit of money, due in part, one guesses, to some sexy content – there’s a few scenes of eskimos offering people to shag their wives, which would have titillated white audiences in 1960."

=== Box office ===
Kinematograph Weekly called it a "money maker" at the British box office in 1960. This arguably inspired Rank to invest in another Canadian set love story, The Trap (1966).

According to Ray, "I know that Savage Innocents made a lot of money because the producer told me he was in the black after six months. Usually it takes 18 months. "

Janni said he and Malenotti originally planned to make a series of co productions together but decided against it after filming ended. "It's not that we were in constant disagreement or came to blows or anything like that." said Janni. "But two producers working on one film is not a good idea — anymore than are two cooks working in one kitchen."

== The Mighty Quinn ==
Bob Dylan is widely believed to have written the song "Quinn the Eskimo (The Mighty Quinn)" in tribute to Quinn's performance.

== Notes ==
- Cocks, Jay (January 1977). "A director in Aspic". Take One. pp. 18–19.
