= Ghosts of Rome =

1961 film

- Film poster
- Directed by: Antonio Pietrangeli
- Written by: Sergio Amidei; Ennio Flaiano; Ruggero Maccari; Antonio Pietrangeli; Ettore Scola
- Based on: idea by Sergio Amidei story by Ennio Flaiano; Antonio Pietrangeli; Ettore Scola; Ruggero Maccari
- Produced by: Franco Cristaldi
- Starring: Marcello Mastroianni
- Cinematography: Giuseppe Rotunno
- Edited by: Eraldo Da Roma
- Music by: Nino Rota
- Production companies: Galatea Film; Lux Film; Vides Cinematografica
- Distributed by: Lux Film; Gala (UK)
- Release dates: 1961; August 1964 (UK)
- Running time: 105 minutes
- Country: Italy
- Language: Italian

Ghosts of Rome (Italian: Fantasmi a Roma) is a 1961 Italian comedy film directed by Antonio Pietrangeli. It was released in the UK in 1964 as The Phantom Lovers.

== Plot ==
Count di Roviano refuses to sell his palace to a developer, despite having no money. He lives with ghosts: Ronaldo, a lady's man, Bartholomew, a friar, Flora, who died with love, and a five year old boy.

The Count is blown up by his water heater and joins the ghosts. His nephew Federico inherits the castle and moves in with his girlfriend Eileen, intending to sell it. The ghosts call in an artist friend, Caparra, and try to get him to finish a painting so the castle is declared a national monument.

== Cast ==
- Marcello Mastroianni - Reginaldo / Federico di Roviano / Gino
- Vittorio Gassman - Caparra, pittore del '600, rivale del Caravaggio
- Belinda Lee - Eileen
- Sandra Milo - Donna Flora
- Eduardo De Filippo - Don Annibale, Principe di Roviano
- Claudio Gora - Ing. Telladi
- Tino Buazzelli - Father Bartolomeo
- Franca Marzi - Nella
- Ida Galli - Carla
- Lilla Brignone - Regina
- Claudio Catania - Poldino
- Michele Riccardini - Antonio, tailor and doorman
- Enzo Cerusico - Admirer
- Nadia Marlowa
- Luciana Gilli - Girl in the park (as Gloria Gilli)
- Enzo Maggio - Fricandò
- Graziella Galvani - Mathematics teacher

== Production ==
Nino Rota did the music. A writer on Rota's career analysed the score, saying that:

The music for the credits... is supplied first by a sprightly modern jazz combo, then by a barrel organ. This is appropriate for a film that is about the present and the past in two ways: ghosts occupying a palazzo in present-day Rome, and the destructive attempts of its new owners to modernise it, attempts thwarted by the ghosts. However, the ghosts’ motifs are not always played on old instruments; while on their first appearance in the film, each one’s motif is so introduced... this often gives way to jazziness... This play with motifs and instrumentations continues throughout the film and is appropriate: the ghosts are not anti-modern; they enjoy playing about in modern-day Rome while also wishing to preserve the inheritance of (their) past.

== Reception ==
Variety said "pic is quaint but bogs down after some inventive early passages... special effects are good but without the film pacing to make them captivating throughout. Obvious phantoms soon get repetitive."

One review called it "a jolly little Roman fantasy." The Spectator called it "a cheerful surprise."

The Monthly Film Bulletin called it an "inoffensive comedy has a theme too slight and too lacking to be anything other than tedious when treated at such length."

Sight and Sound called it "a fragile fantasy". Filmink called it "entertaining".

== Awards ==
Eduardo De Filippo won Best Supporting Actor at the 1961 San Francisco Film Festival.
