= Wasteland (1960 film) =

- Directed by: Marcel Carné
- Screenplay by: Marcel Carné; Henri-François Rey
- Based on: Tomboy by Hal Ellson
- Produced by: Louis Dolivet
- Starring: Danielle Gaubert; Roland Lesaffre; Maurice Caffarelli; Constantin Andrieu; Denise Vernac; François Nocher
- Cinematography: Claude Renoir
- Edited by: Henri Rust; Marguerite Renoir
- Music by: Michel Legrand; Francis Lemarque
- Production companies: Gray-Film; Les Films Rive Gauche; Jolly Film
- Distributed by: Cinédis
- Release date: 9 November 1960
- Running time: 102 minutes
- Countries: France; Italy
- Language: French

Wasteland (French: Terrain vague) is a 1960 French drama film directed by Marcel Carné and starring Danielle Gaubert and Maurice Caffarelli. The story is loosely based on the novel Tomboy by Hal Ellson.

== Plot ==
Around a newly built HLM stretch wasteland and brownfield providing refuge to young people fleeing the unfathomable tedium of family life in the Paris suburbs. They share their secrets, the products of their thefts, submit to strict rituals. The sanctity of their revolt is highlighted by the initiation by jumping blindfolded and blood rite of passage. Dan, a beautiful young tomboy, rules the clan.

But the gang threatens increasingly sliding into serious crime, which is condemned by Dan and Lucky, a big brawler boy but who begins to consider an orderly life. Now they are ostracized along with the young Babar, accused of being a stool pigeon. Lucky, on the run, and Dan discover a mutual romantic inclination, while Babar, cruelly mistreated and humiliated, commits suicide.

== Cast ==
- Danielle Gaubert as Dan
- Roland Lesaffre as Big Chief
- Maurice Caffarelli as Lucky
- Constantin Andrieu as Marcel
- Jean-Louis Bras as Babar
- Dominique Dieudonné as Le râleur
- Denise Vernac as Marcel's mother
- François Nocher
- Alfonso Mathis as Hans
- Pierre Richard
- Georges Wilson as His Honour J. Royer the juvenile judge
- Dominique Davray as Dan's mother
- Simone Berthier as Babar's mother
- Pierre Collet as Lucky's father
- Claudine Auger as Prisunic' saleswoman shouting stop thief
- Dominique Lépinay
- Pierre Parel
- Anne Béranger
- Gib Grossac as The show announcer at the fair
- Georgette Peyron
- Jacques Berger
- Jacques Galland as Prisunic's manager
- Jacques Mancier as Babar's father
- Charles Bayard as An onlooker at Prisunic
- Louisette Rousseau as A woman at Prisunic
