= Napoleon II, the Eaglet =

1961 film

Napoleon II, the Eagle
- Directed by: Claude Boissol
- Written by: Paul Andréota; Claude Boissol
- Based on: Napoleon II, the Eagle by André Castelot
- Produced by: Georges Glass
- Starring: Bernard Verley; Danièle Gaubert; Danièle Gaubert
- Cinematography: Roger Fellous
- Edited by: Louis Devaivre
- Music by: Paul Bonneau; Fred Freed
- Production company: Films Matignon
- Distributed by: Pathé Consortium Cinéma
- Release date: 1 November 1961
- Running time: 125 minutes
- Countries: Italy; France
- Language: French
- Box office: 2,029,634 admissions (France)

Napoleon II, the Eaglet (French: Napoléon II, l'Aiglon) is a 1961 French historical drama film directed by Claude Boissol and starring Bernard Verley, Jean Marais and Danièle Gaubert. The scenario was written by Paul Andréota and based on a novel of André Castelot. The film's sets were designed by the art director Wolf Witzemann.

== Synopsis ==
The film portrays the life of Napoleon II, considered Emperor of France by Bonapartists, who lived most of his life in Vienna under the title the Duke of Reichstadt.

== Cast ==
- Bernard Verley as Duke of Reichstadt
- Jean-Pierre Cassel as Gustav von Neipperg
- René Dary as Dietrichstein
- Danièle Gaubert as Thérèse Pèche
- Jean Marais as General de Montholon
- Georges Marchal as General Neipperg
- Liliane Patrick as Countess Camerata
- Jean-Marc Thibault as Napoleon I
- Paul Hubschmid as Prokesch
- Jacques Jouanneau as Esterhazy
- Marianne Koch as Empress Marie-Louise
- Josef Meinrad as Emperor Francis II
- Sabine Sinjen as Archduchess Sophie
- Paul Cambo as Ambassador of France
- Jean-Pascal Duffard as the 7-year-old duke
- François Maistre as Metternich
- Yves Bocquillon as the 3-year-old duke
- Jacques Fabbri as Doctor Malfati
- Raymond Gérôme as Apponyi
- Anthony Stuart as Lord Crowley, ambassador of England
- René Clermont

== Bibliography ==
- Goble, Alan. The Complete Index to Literary Sources in Film. Walter de Gruyter, 1999.
