= Didier Decoin =

French screenwriter and writer (1945–2026)

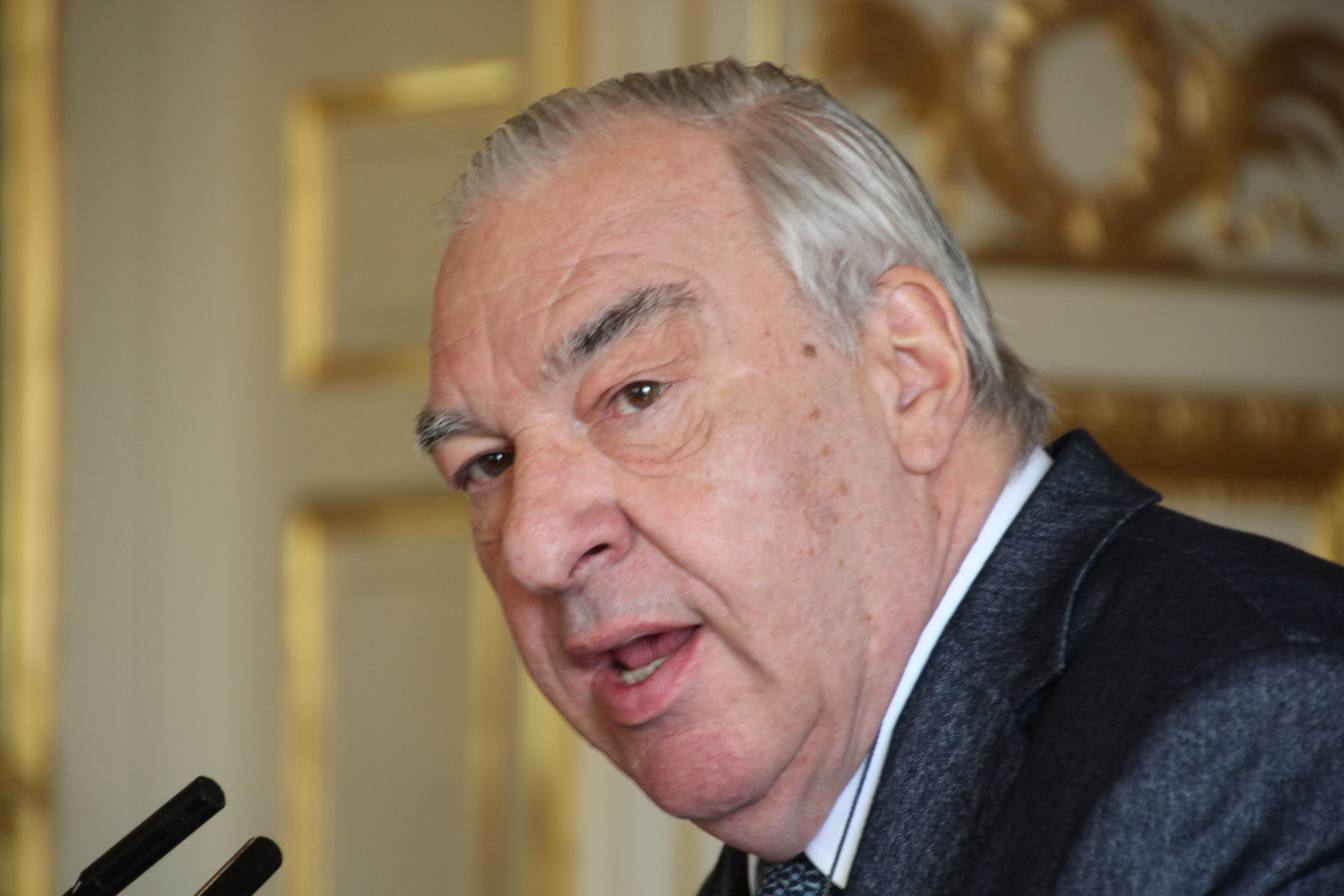
- Decoin in 2014
- Born: 13 March 1945; Boulogne-Billancourt, France
- Died: 5 August 2026 (aged 81); Villejuif, France
- Occupation: Writer
- Known for: President of the Académie Goncourt (2020–2024)
- Father: Henri Decoin
- Awards: Prix Goncourt (1977)

Didier Decoin (13 March 1945 – 5 August 2026) was a French screenwriter and writer awarded the Prix Goncourt in 1977.

== Life and career ==
Didier Decoin was the son of filmmaker Henri Decoin. He began his career as a newspaper journalist at France-Soir, Le Figaro and VOD, and radio Europe 1. At the same time he started writing.

While continuing his writing, he became writer in film and television (and adapted scripts for television as the major films Les Misérables, The Count of Monte Cristo, Balzac and Napoleon).

In 1995, he became the Secretary of the Académie Goncourt.

Decoin died on 5 August 2026, at the age of 81.

== Bibliography ==
=== Novels ===
- Le Procès à l'Amour (Seuil, 1966) (Bourse Del Duca). See The Case Against Love. Helen Weaver (translation). New American Library. 1967. OCLC 3342476.
- La Mise au monde (Seuil, 1967)
- Laurence (Seuil, 1969)
- Elisabeth ou Dieu seul le sait (Seuil, 1970) (prix des Quatre Jurys)
- Abraham de Brooklyn (Seuil, 1971) (prix des Libraires)
- Ceux qui vont s'aimer (Seuil, 1973)
- Un policeman (Seuil, 1975)
- John l'Enfer (Seuil, 1977) (Prix Goncourt)
- Le bureau des jardins et des étangs (Stock, 2017)
- La Dernière Nuit (Balland, 1978)
- L'Enfant de la mer de Chine (Seuil, 1981 )
- Les Trois vies de Babe Ozouf (Seuil, 1983)
- Autopsie d'une étoile (Seuil, 1987)
- Meurtre à l'anglaise (Mercure de France, 1988)
- La Femme de chambre du Titanic (Seuil, 1991) - basis for the 1997 film The Chambermaid on the Titanic
- Docile (Seuil, 1994)
- La Promeneuse d'oiseaux (Seuil, 1996)
- La Route de l'aéroport (Fayard, 1997)
- Louise (Seuil, 1998)
- Madame Seyerling (Seuil, 2002)
- Avec vue sur la Mer (Nil Editions, 2005), Prix du Cotentin 2005, Prix Livre & Mer Henri-Queffélec 2006
- Henri ou Henry: le roman de mon père (Stock, May 2006)
- Est-ce ainsi que les femmes meurent (Grasset, February 2009)

=== Essays ===
- Il fait Dieu (Julliard 1975, Fayard 1997)
- La Nuit de l'été (with film by J.C. Brialy, Balland 1979)
- La Bible racontée aux enfants (Calmann-Levy)
- Il était une joie... Andersen (Ramsay, 1982)
- Béatrice en enfer (Lieu Commun, 1984 )
- L'Enfant de Nazareth (with Marie-Hélène About, Nouvelle Cité, 1989)
- Elisabeth Catez ou l'Obsession de Dieu (Balland, 1991), Prix de littérature religieuse 1992
- Lewis et Alice (Laffont, 1992)
- Jésus, le Dieu qui riait (Stock, 1999)
- "Dictionnaire amoureux de la Bible"

=== Collaborative works ===
- La Hague, with Natacha Hochman (photography) (Isoète, 1991)
- Cherbourg, with Natacha Hochman (photography) (Isoète, 1992)
- Presqu'île de lumière, with Patrick Courault (photography) (Isoète, 1996)
- Sentinelles de lumière, with Jean-Marc Coudour (photography) (Desclée de Brouwer, 1997)

=== Screenplays ===
- La Merveilleuse Visite (dir. Marcel Carné, 1973)
- La Bible (dir. Marcel Carné, 1976)
- I as in Icarus (dir. Henri Verneuil, 1979)
- L'Indic (dir. Serge Leroy, 1983)
- De guerre lasse (dir. Robert Enrico, 1987)
- Un bon petit diable (dir. Jean-Claude Brialy)
- The Veiled Man (dir. Maroun Bagdadi, 1987)
- Dancing Machine (dir. Gilles Béhat, 1990)
- Out of Life (dir. Maroun Bagdadi, 1991)
- Mouche (dir. Marcel Carné, 1992, incomplete film)
- Des feux mal éteints (dir. Serge Moati, 1994)
- Jakob the Liar (dir. Peter Kassovitz, 1999)
- The Count of Monte Cristo (dir. Josée Dayan, 1999, TV miniseries)
- Balzac (dir. Josée Dayan, 1999, TV miniseries)
- The King Is Dancing (dir. Gérard Corbiau (2000)
- Les Misérables (dir. Josée Dayan, 2000, TV miniseries)
