= Line of Demarcation (film) =

- Directed by: Claude Chabrol
- Screenplay by: Claude Chabrol
- Based on: Mémoires d'un agent secret de la France libre et La Ligne de démarcation by Colonel Rémy
- Produced by: Georges de Beauregard
- Starring: Jean Seberg; Maurice Ronet
- Cinematography: Jean Rabier
- Edited by: Jacques Gaillard
- Music by: Pierre Jansen
- Production companies: Rome Paris Films; Société Nouvelle de Cinématographie
- Distributed by: Compagnie Commerciale Française Cinématographique
- Release date: 25 May 1966
- Running time: 120 minutes
- Country: France
- Language: French

Line of Demarcation is a 1966 war drama film written and directed by Claude Chabrol. Its title in French is La Ligne de démarcation. It is based on upon the memoir Mémoires d'un agent secret de la France libre et La Ligne de démarcation by Gilbert Renault under his pseudonym Colonel Rémy.

== Plot ==
A small village in the Jura is split by the river Loue, which in that area constitutes the line of demarcation between occupied France and the free zone. The Nazis step up their activity against the resistance, insisting that any who attempt to cross the line of demarcation will be shot. An aristocratic French officer, Pierre (Ronet), is released by Nazi soldiers to find his chateau converted into a German command centre, and having to live in the hunting lodge. Pierre is resigned to France having lost the war and has relatively cordial relations with the German governor, a fellow aristocrat. But his British-born wife Mary (Seberg) supports the resistance movement and is willing to risk her life for it. At an early scene, she is seen arranging the successful escape of downed Allied airmen, across occupied France and thence to Spain and Gibraltar. Meanwhile, a crooked smuggler is operating in the town, asking huge sums from a Jewish family to get them across the river but in fact leads them to the Nazis and steals all their possessions. In retribution the crook is killed by a member of the Resistance. Gradually, the plot comes to focus on two British spies hidden in the forest, collecting military information and broadcasting it to London. They are discovered by the Germans and one is wounded and captured. Should he be interrogated and reveal all he knows, local networks would be compromised and destroyed. At the hospital a doctor, member of the Resistance, tries to stall the Germans - but two energetic Gestapo agents push for the interrogation to begin. Resistance men, dressed in German uniforms, pretend to raid the hospital and remove the wounded spy before the real Germans could arrive. The furious Gestapo men, hunting for the hidden spy, threaten to arrest and torture the doctor's wife - whereupon the doctor commits suicide. An informer tells the Germans where the spy is hidden, tended by Pierre's wife the Countess - but before the Gestapo gets there, the spy was removed elsewhere. Still, the Germans arrest Many though they have no evidenced against her - but being British and an aristocrat, she would be interned, not tortured. Meanwhile the Resistance gets the village Priest to cooperate in a plot to smuggle the wounded spy to the other side of the river inside the coffin of a recently deceased 97-year old woman. The cortege nearly makes it to the other side of the bridge when the two Gestapo agents suspect the ruse and demand to stop and open the coffin - whereupon the hitherto skeptic Pierre pulls a pistol and shoots the two Gestapo agents to death, being immediately killed himself by the German soldiers. In the final scene the villagers, gathered around Pierre's body, defy the Germans by singing the French anthem, La Marseillaise. When they get to the verse about "The tyranny has raised against us its blood-soaked banner" the camera zooms to the Nazi Swastika flag flying over occupied France.

== Principal cast ==
Actor	Role
Jean Seberg	Mary, comtesse de Damville
Maurice Ronet	Pierre, comte de Damville
Daniel Gélin	Doctor Jacques Lafaye
Jacques Perrin	Michel, le radio
Stéphane Audran	Dr. Lafaye's Wife
Reinhard Kolldehoff	Major von Pritsch
Claude Léveillée	Captain Duncan Presgrave
Roger Dumas	Chéti, Passer
Jean Yanne	Tricot, teacher
Noël Roquevert	Eugène Menetru, Innkeeper

== Production ==
The film was shot in Dole, Jura, starting on January 31, 1966. The shooting lasted 7 weeks.

== Availability ==
The film has been released on DVD.

== See also ==
- Demarcation line (France)
