= Antonio Pietrangeli =

Italian film director and screenwriter

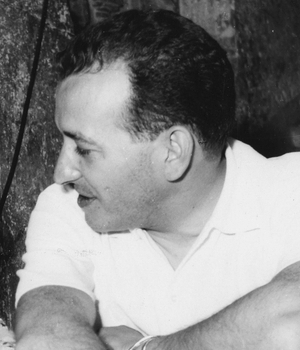
- Pietrangeli in 1953
- Born: 19 January 1919; Rome, Lazio, Kingdom of Italy
- Died: 12 July 1968 (aged 49); Gaeta, Lazio, Italy
- Occupations: Film director; screenwriter
- Years active: 1941–1968

Antonio Pietrangeli (19 January 1919 – 12 July 1968) was an Italian film director and screenwriter. He was a major practitioner of the commedia all'italiana genre.

== Biography ==
Pietrangeli was born in Rome. He started in the film industry by writing movie reviews for Italian cinema magazines such as Bianco e Nero and Cinema.

As a screenwriter, his works include Ossessione and La Terra Trema directed by Luchino Visconti, Fabiola directed by Alessandro Blasetti, and Europe '51 directed by Roberto Rossellini.

Pietrangeli's own directing debut was Empty Eyes, a 1953 film starring Gabriele Ferzetti. This was followed by the Alberto Sordi comedies The Bachelor (1956) and Souvenirs d'Italie (1957).

The director's career highlights include Adua and Her Friends (1960), a drama with Marcello Mastroianni and Simone Signoret, the supernatural comedy Ghosts of Rome (1961), again with Mastroianni, The Magnificent Cuckold (1964), a comedy of adultery starring Claudia Cardinale and Ugo Tognazzi, and the comedy-drama I Knew Her Well (1965) with Stefania Sandrelli.

He won the Nastro d'Argento for Best Director for I Knew Her Well.

Pietrangeli died from drowning by accident in the Gulf of Gaeta in 1968, while working on the film How, When and with Whom. The film was completed by his friend, director Valerio Zurlini.

== Filmography ==
- Prelude to Madness (1948)
- Empty Eyes (Il sole negli occhi) (1953)
- Girandola 1910 – Episode of Mid-Century Loves (Amori di mezzo secolo) (1953)
- The Bachelor (Lo scapolo) (1955)
- Souvenirs d'Italie (Souvenir d'Italie) (1957)
- March's Child (Nata di marzo) (1958)
- Adua and Her Friends (Adua e le compagne) (1960)
- Ghosts of Rome (Fantasmi a Roma) (1961)
- The Girl from Parma (La parmigiana) (1963)
- La visita (1963)
- The Magnificent Cuckold (Il magnifico cornuto) (1964)
- I Knew Her Well (Io la conoscevo bene) (1965)
- Fata Marta – Episode of Sex Quartet (Le fate) (1966)
- How, When and with Whom (Come, quando, perché) (1969)
