= Jacques Fonteray =

French designer

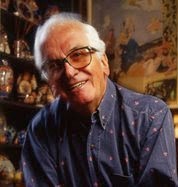
- Jacques Fonteray
- Born: 10 February 1918; Grenoble, Rhône-Alpes, France
- Died: 6 January 2013 (aged 94); Paris, France
- Occupation: Art director
- Years active: 1964-1995 (film)

Jacques Fonteray (10 February 1918 – 6 January 2013) was a French costume designer active in the film industry. Amongst his credits were the costumes for the 1968 film Barbarella.

== Selected filmography ==
- Inferno (L'enfer)by H.G.Clouzot, with Romy Schneider (1964)
- Marco the Magnificent (La Fabuleuse Aventure de Marco Polo) by Denys de La Patellière (1965)
- "Rapture" by John Guillermin (1965)
- "Is Paris burning ?" ( Paris brûle-t-il ? by René Clément with Kirk Douglas (1966)
- "King of Hearts" (Le Roi de Coeur) by Philippe de Broca with Alan Bates (1966)
- I Killed Rasputin (J'ai tué Raspoutine)by Robert Hossein (1967) with Geraldine Chaplin (1967)
- Darling Caroline (1968)
- Castle Keep(Un château en enfer) by Sydney Pollack(1969) with Burt Lancaster
- Borsalino by Jacques Deray (1970)
- Delusions of Grandeur (La Folie des Grandeurs) by Gerard Oury (1971)with Yves Montand & Louis de Funès (1971)
- Rum Runners(Boulevard du Rhum, by Robert Enrico (1971) with Brigitte Bardot
- Barbe Bleue by Edward Dmytryk (1972)with Raquel Welch & Richard Burton
- "Story of a Love Story" (L’Impossible Objet), by John Frankenheimer, with Alan Bates (1973)
- "French Connection 2", by John Frankenheimer, with Gene Hackman (1975)
- James Bond and Moonraker by Lewis Gilbert with Roger Moore (1979)
- " 1001 Nights" (Les Mille et Une Nuits) by Philippe de Broca, with Catherine Zeta-Jones (1989)
- Mouche (unfinished film)

== Bibliography ==
- Amber Butchart. The Fashion of Film: How Cinema has Inspired Fashion. Hachette, 2016.
- Elizabeth Castaldo Lundèn : "Barbarella's Wardrobe exploring Jacques Fonteray's Intergalactic Runway " in Film Fashion and Consumption (vol.5 (2) page 185-211. Décembre 2016
- Working documents and sketches at the Margaret Herrick Library. Academy of Motion Picture Arts & Sciences (Los Angeles)

200 sketches & working documents. La Cinémathèque Française (Paris)
