= Danielle Gaubert =

French actress

- Danièle Gaubert
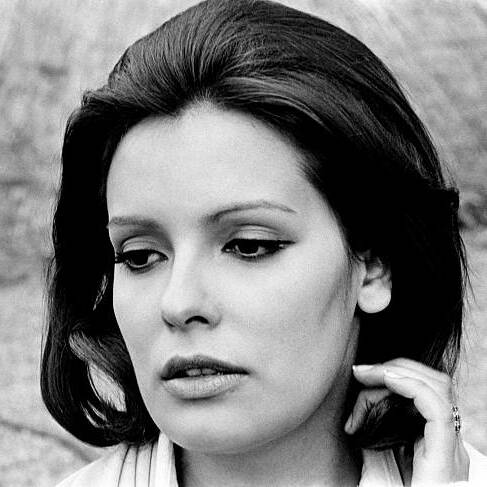
- Born: Danièle Louise Regina Gaubert; 9 August 1943; Nuars (France)
- Died: 3 November 1987; Marseille (France)
- Occupation: Actor

Danielle Gaubert (9 August 1943 – 4 November 1987) was a French actress.

Born in Nuars, Danielle Gaubert was discovered at 16 years old by Claude Autant-Lara, who chose her for the film Les régates de San Francisco, and soon after appeared in a number of German and Italian productions, including Flight from Ashiya (1964), The Golden Claws of the Cat Girl (1968), Camille 2000 (1969) and Underground (1970). In 1963 she married Radhamés Trujillo Martínez, a son of the Dominican dictator Rafael Trujillo, but they divorced in 1968.

During the shooting of her last movie Snow Job, she met the ski champion Jean-Claude Killy, whom she married in 1972. She left show business and had a daughter. At the age of 44, she died of cancer.

== Filmography ==
Year	Title	Role	Notes
1960	The Regattas of San Francisco	Lidia	
1960	Wasteland	Dan	
1961	Le Pavé de Paris	Arlette	
1961	Vive Henri IV... vive l'amour!	Charlotte de Montmorency	
1961	Napoleon II, the Eagle	Thérèse Pêche	
1962	Una storia milanese	Valeria	
1962	The Gypsy Baron	Saffi	
1963	And So to Bed	Französin	
1964	Encounter in Salzburg	Manuela	
1964	Flight from Ashiya	Leila	
1967	Le grand dadais	Emmanuelle	
1968	La louve solitaire (aka La gatta dagli artigli d'oro)	Françoise Tilmont, dite la Louve	
1969	Paris n'existe pas	Angela	
1969	Camille 2000	Marguerite Gautier	
1969	Come, quando, perché (aka How, When and with Whom)	Paola	
1970	Underground	Yvonne	
1972	Snow Job	Monica Scotti	(final film role)
