= Hans Ruesch =

Swiss racing driver, novelist, and activist (1913–2007)

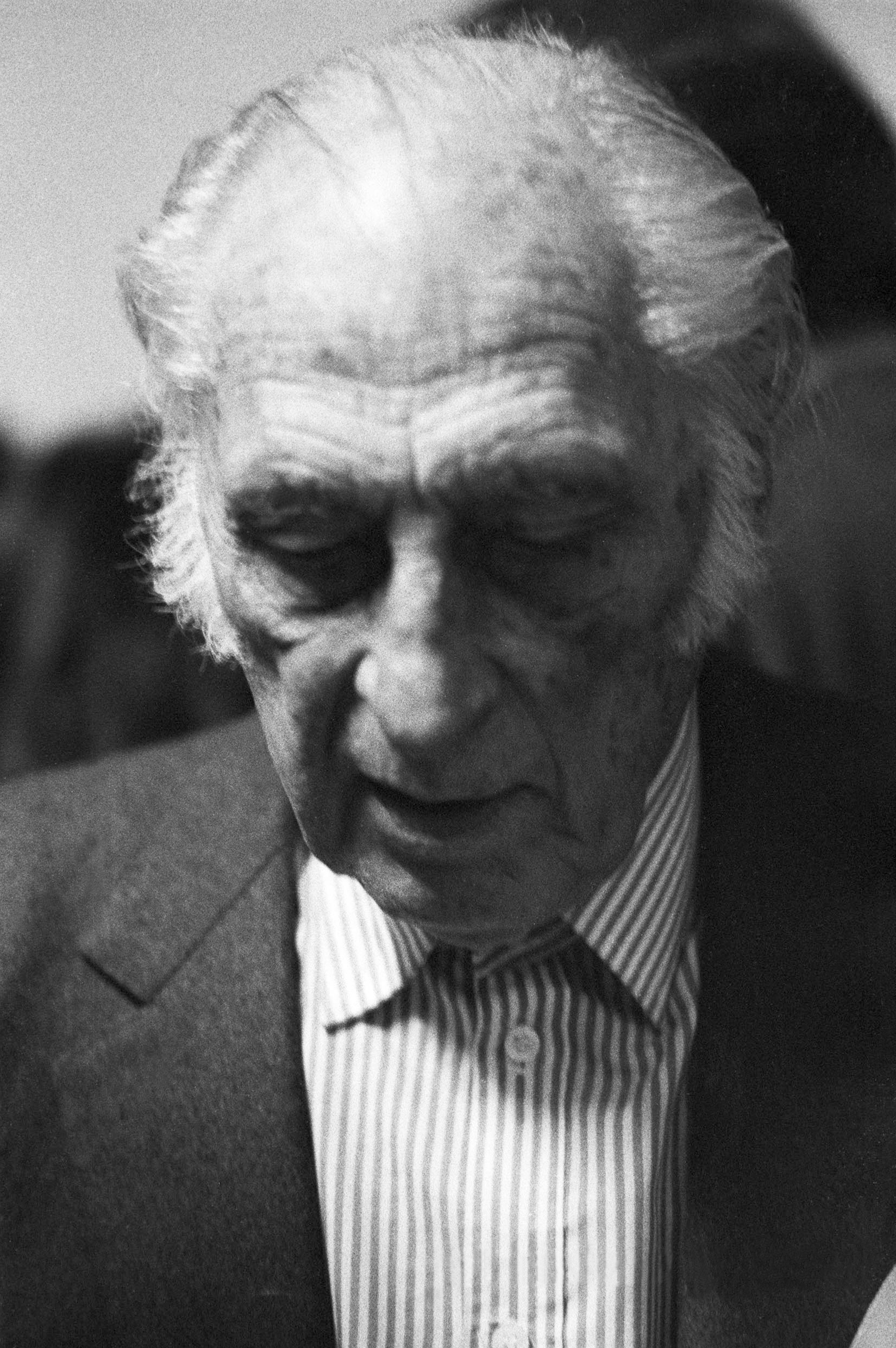
- Ruesch in 1993
- Nationality: (Switzerland) Swiss
- Born: 17 May 1913 Naples, Italy
- Died: 27 August 2007 (aged 94)
- Debut season: 1932
- Former teams: Maserati, Alfa Romeo, MG
- Starts: 100 +
- Wins: 27
- Poles: ?
- Best finish: 1st in multiple

Previous series
- Grand Prix

Championship titles
- 1976: Founder, CIVIS (Center for Scientific Information on Vivisection)

Hans Ruesch (17 May 1913 – 27 August 2007) was a Swiss racing driver, a novelist, and an internationally prominent activist against animal experiments and vivisection. Ruesch has been described as a pioneer of the anti-vivisection movement.

== Family ==
Ruesch was born in Naples to an Italian-speaking Swiss mother and a German-speaking Swiss father. He lived the first 14 years of his life in Naples, where his father was a textile industrialist and a specialist in Pompeian Art. Ruesch attended boarding school in Switzerland. He then studied law at the University of Zurich but dropped out in 1932 to join the racing circuit.

After World War II, in 1946, Ruesch left the United States and returned to Naples. He married Maria Luisa de la Feld in 1949. They separated in the early 1970s and Maria Luisa died in 2006. Hans Ruesch died of cancer at his home in Lugano, Switzerland. He was 94. He is survived by his daughter, Vivian Ruesch Mellon of Manhattan, his sons, Hans Jr. Ruesch and Peter Ruesch, of Switzerland, and five grandchildren, Diana Mellon, Angela Mellon, Sarah Mellon, Jessica Ruesch and Gina Ruesch.

== Racing career ==
He began racing in 1932 with MG at the Klausenrennen when he was 19. During the 1930s, he drove several Alfa Romeo and Maserati racing and sports cars at many smaller events throughout Europe. Ruesch drove a Maserati 8CM 1934 and a Maserati 4CS in 1935 and 1936, followed by an Alfa Romeo GP car in 1936 and 1937. He also took part in the 1937 South Africa series. He competed in more than 100 races in Europe and South Africa, winning 27 races. During the early fifties, he drove a Ferrari 4.1-litre MM sports car.

== Writing and film career ==
In the late 1930s, Ruesch moved to the United States, publishing short fiction in popular magazines. In 1946, he returned to Naples to continue writing. His most popular novels include Top of the World (Harper, 1950), The Racer (Ballantine, 1953), and South of the Heart: A Novel of Modern Arabia (Coward-McCann, 1957).

In The New York Times Book Review review of Top of the World, Max Eastman called Mr. Ruesch "a born storyteller," and the novel is "a brilliant feat of poetic imagination." Ironically, Hans Ruesch had never seen an Eskimo. He based his story on the Oscar-winning film Eskimo (1933), directed by W.S. van Dyke.

Director Nicholas Ray wrote the screenplay for the movie of Ruesch's novel, Top of the World. It debuted in Europe under the name, Ombre bianche. In 1961, it was released in the United States as The Savage Innocents. Anthony Quinn starred as Inuk, an Inuit (formerly Eskimo), who has had little contact with white men. At a trading post, Inuk accidentally kills a missionary, who insulted him by refusing the traditional Inuit (sexual) hospitality of wife-sharing. Inuk is pursued by a Javert-like police trooper, Peter O'Toole, in his first movie role. Mr. O'Toole refused to be credited with this movie, because his voice was dubbed. This movie was nominated for the Golden Palm award at the 1960 Cannes Film Festival.

Drawing on his experiences in European auto racing, Ruesch wrote the novel The Racer. It was released as the film The Racers (1955). Kirk Douglas starred as Gino Borgesa, a reckless Formula One driver, ensnared by speed, adrenaline, and a Hollywood 1950s romance. The movie was shot at several classic circuits, including Monaco, the Nürburgring, the Mille Miglia, and Circuit de Spa-Francorchamps, with the climactic race at Reims-Gueux.

== Activism career ==
Ruesch was internationally known as an outspoken advocate against vivisection and other forms of animal testing. An animal lover since his childhood, he became an activist against animal testing, while living in Rome. Ruesch did not believe that medical research could benefit by using such methods. Instead, Ruesch insisted that medicine was led dangerously astray by what he saw as pseudo-science, and a fatally false methodology. He argued that rabbits, mice, rats and other animals are not anatomically and physiologically similar to humans and drew upon numerous statements from doctors and researchers in support of his stance (see his work, 1,000 Doctors and More Against Vivisection). Therefore, such animal testing cannot reliably predict physiological reactions in humans. In 1974, he founded the Center for Scientific Information on Vivisection (CIVIS) and devoted the rest of his life to the abolition of vivisection.

In the 1970s, Ruesch started writing exposés of the animal testing and research industry. He wrote the Slaughter of the Innocent (Bantam, 1978) and the Naked Empress, or The Great Medical Fraud, as well as publishing "The International Foundation Report Dedicated to the Abolition of Vivisection". Slaughter of the Innocent (Civitas Publications, 1983) is credited with promoting and strengthening the animal-rights movement in the U.S. and abroad.

There is potential confusion concerning Ruesch's first two books denouncing vivisection. His first book on the subject was written and published in European countries with a title in each language that would translate into English as "The Naked Empress." (Ruesch was multilingual, and he wrote the translations himself.) When this same work was to be published in England, the title was changed, at the publisher's request, to "Slaughter of the Innocent", and that is the title used when the book was subsequently issued (by Civitas) in the United States. Some years later, Ruesch wrote a second book criticising vivisection, in English, which was released (again, by Civitas) in the United States, with the title "The Naked Empress, or the Great Medical Fraud". Whereas the first book focused on vivisection as a barbaric and unscientific means of obtaining medical knowledge, the second book focused on the profit motives of the medical-pharmaceutical industry in perpetuating vivisection. To summarise, the book known by the English title "The Naked Empress" is a different book to the one published earlier in Europe with that same title in other languages but known in English as "Slaughter of the Innocent". (This information is provided by the original organiser of Civitas.)

== Selective bibliography ==
=== Novels ===
- Top of the World series:
  1. Top of the World (1950) (ISBN 999755602X)
  2. Back to the Top of the World (1973) ISBN 0450021084
- The Racer (1953)
- Com'esser poverli (1956)
- South of the Heart: A Novel of Modern Arabia, AKA The Great Thirst, AKA The Arab (1957)
- The Game (1961)
- I mammà e papà (1962)
- The Stealers (1962)
- Make a Fortune (1967)

=== Nonfiction ===
- Naked Empress, or the Great Medical Fraud (Imperatrice nuda. La scienza medica attuale sotto accusa) (1976) ISBN 0686402332
- Die Fälscher Der Wissenschaft: Techn. Rapport (1979) ISBN 3921288533
- Slaughter of the Innocent (1978) ISBN 0553111515
- I Falsari della Scienza (1980)
- 1000 Doctors (And Many More) Against Vivisection (1989)
- La medicina smascherata: L'antivivisezionismo come esperienza politica (2005) ISBN 883595620X
- La figlia dell'imperatrice: La grande industria della malattia (2005) ISBN 8872269466

== Filmography ==
- The Racers (1955)
  as Such Men Are Dangerous (UK)
- "The 20th Century-Fox Hour" (1 episode, 1956)
  Fox Hour of Stars (USA: rerun title) - Men Against Speed (1956) TV Episode based on the novel The Racer
- The Savage Innocents (1960) based on the novel Top of the World
- Black Gold (2012) based on the novel South of the Heart: A Novel of Modern Arabia / The Great Thirst / The Arab
