= Who's Been Sleeping in My Bed? =

1963 film by Daniel Mann

- Theatrical release lobby card
- Directed by: Daniel Mann
- Written by: Jack Rose
- Produced by: Jack Rose
- Starring: Dean Martin; Elizabeth Montgomery; Elliott Reid; Carol Burnett; Martin Balsam; Jill St. John; Richard Conte; Macha Méril; Johnny Silver; Louis Nye; Yoko Tani; Jack Soo
- Cinematography: Joseph Ruttenberg
- Edited by: George Tomasini
- Music by: George Duning
- Distributed by: Paramount Pictures
- Release date: December 25, 1963
- Running time: 103 minutes
- Country: United States
- Language: English

Who's Been Sleeping in My Bed? is a 1963 American comedy film directed by Daniel Mann and starring Dean Martin, Elizabeth Montgomery, and Carol Burnett.

== Plot ==
Jason Steel is an actor who plays a compassionate doctor on a popular TV drama. He is confused with his TV role and is so beloved that women won't leave him alone, as evidenced by an all-women mob that surrounds him when he opens a new store. This, combined with him feeling that his show has gone stale, causes him a lot of stress.

Jason meets his poker buddies, Tom, Harry, Sanford, Yoshimi, and Leonard, for a weekly Wednesday poker game. They discuss marriage, Jason saying that he and his fiancée, sculpture teacher Melissa, will show the others how great marriage is when they're married. A woman calls then, asking for Jason, saying that she needs help. His buddies tease him when he says he has to go home to meet someone. They're unaware that the women who call, asking for Jason, are their own wives.

That night, the woman is Jacqueline, Tom's wife, who asks Jason for advice about the excitement leaving her marriage. Ecstatic that he listens, she kisses him; he repulses her and reiterates that she needs to talk to Tom. His valet, Charlie, overhears and believes that they're having an affair.

The next poker night, Tobi, Harry's wife, calls for Jason. She wants his advice about her marriage. He leaves to envious comments, and they meet at his house. Jason and Tobi dance, while he provides her advice. Again, Charlie, thinks that they're having an affair. On-set, Harry tells a visiting Melissa that she shouldn't keep Jason up so late, as it makes him worthless at work. She's confused and argues with Jason when he asks her confusing questions and wants to postpone the wedding.

At the next poker game, after Jason's called away, his friends are confused as to why he's still "shopping" around when he has Melissa. At home, Jason gives advice to three friends' wives in turn, speaking to Yoshimi's wife, Isami, then Tobi, then Jacqueline, each of whom hides when the next woman rings the bell. Finally, a policeman rings. He noticed the activity and decided to investigate. His voice causes each woman to emerge, slinking away from the house.

A frustrated Jason schedules an appointment with Sanford, who's a psychiatrist. Jason tells him their friends' wives have been calling him, unwittingly giving him a wrong impression. He also admits that he's worried that his marriage will be unhappy, like their friends' marriages. After, Jason feels better and wants to marry Melissa. Stella, Melissa's best friend and Sanford's assistant, eavesdrops. Both she and Sanford believe that Jason's been lusting after everyone's wives; they panic.

Jason calls Melissa and confesses everything. However, Melissa's wary of Jason's neurosis, so agrees with a scheme of Stella's: Melissa will "marry" another man, Sam, to force Jason's hand. A few days later, Melissa confesses that her "marriage" to Sam was a mistake, and she's left him. Jason tells Melissa that he wants to marry her, so she needs to divorce Sam. She tries to tell him the truth, but Stella lies that they're flying to Tijuana for a "divorce." Jason accompanies them and discovers that they tricked him. He leaves, heartbroken that the only honest woman he found lied to him.

Stella and Charlie talk him into talking to Melissa. He goes to see her, still angry, but demands that they marry that night.

== Cast ==
- Dean Martin as Jason Steel
- Elizabeth Montgomery as Melissa Morris
- Elliott Reid as Tom Edwards
- Carol Burnett as Stella Irving
- Martin Balsam as Sanford Kaufman
- Jill St. John as Toby Tobler
- Dianne Foster as Mona Kaufman
- Richard Conte as Leonard Ashley
- Macha Méril as Jacqueline Edwards
- Johnny Silver as Charlie
- Louis Nye as Harry Tobler
- Yoko Tani as Isami Hiroti
- Jack Soo as Yoshimi Hiroti

== Production ==
Carol Burnett makes her film debut.

== Reception ==
Carol Burnett said of her role in the film: "I should have been given the award for “Worst Performance Ever Given in Movies by an Actress.” I was confused, bored and I missed the [live] audience. Nothing was spontaneous." William Asher, Elizabeth Montgomery's husband at the time, quipped "They showed the movie on an airplane and there were seventeen walkouts."

A strongly positive review appeared in The Shreveport Journal, where Frank Grosjean considered this film one of the year's finest comedies and singled out Burnett for extra praise.
