= Snow Job (film) =

- Theatrical release poster
- Directed by: George Englund
- Screenplay by: Jeffrey Bloom; Ken Kolb
- Story by: Richard Gallagher
- Produced by: Edward L. Rissien
- Starring: Jean-Claude Killy; Danièle Gaubert; Cliff Potts
- Cinematography: Gabor Pogany
- Music by: Jacques Loussier
- Distributed by: Warner Bros.
- Release date: 1972 (Limited release)
- Running time: 90 minutes
- Country: United States
- Language: English

Snow Job is a 1972 American independent thriller film directed by George Englund and starring Jean-Claude Killy, Danièle Gaubert, Vittorio De Sica, Lelio Luttazzi, and Cliff Potts.

== Premise ==
A skiing instructor in the Italian Alps robs the winter resort where he works with the help of a down-on-his-luck ski-racer.

== Cast ==
- Jean-Claude Killy: Christian Biton
- Danièle Gaubert: Monica Scotti
- Cliff Potts: Bob Skinner
- Vittorio De Sica: Enrico Dolphi
- Delia Boccardo: Lorraine Borman
- Lelio Luttazzi: Bank Manager
- Umberto D'Orsi: Vito
- Giancarlo Prete: Donato
- Gigi Ballista
