= Three Rooms in Manhattan =

- Directed by: Marcel Carné
- Starring: Annie Girardot; Maurice Ronet; Gabriele Ferzetti
- Music by: Mal Waldron; Martial Solal
- Release date: 1965
- Country: France
- Language: French

Three Rooms in Manhattan (French: Trois chambres à Manhattan) is a black-and-white 1965 French drama film filmed in New York City. It is based on the 1946 novel "Trois Chambres à Manhattan" (which has been translated into English as "Three Rooms in Manhattan" and "Three Bedrooms in Manhattan") by Belgian writer Georges Simenon, about a romance between François, a French actor, and Kay, an American woman. It marks Robert De Niro's film debut.

== Cast ==
- Annie Girardot as Kay Larsi
- Maurice Ronet as François Comte
- O.E. Hasse as Hourvitch
- Roland Lesaffre as Pierre
- Gabriele Ferzetti as Comte Larsi
- Geneviève Page as Yolande Combes
- Robert Hoffmann as Thierry
- Margaret Nolan as June
- Virginia Vee as La chanteuse noire
- Robert De Niro had a small uncredited part as a client at a dinner scene. Richard S. Castellano appears as an angry American. Abe Vigoda also appears uncredited as a man in an elevator.
