= Carl Duering =

German-born British actor (1923–2018)

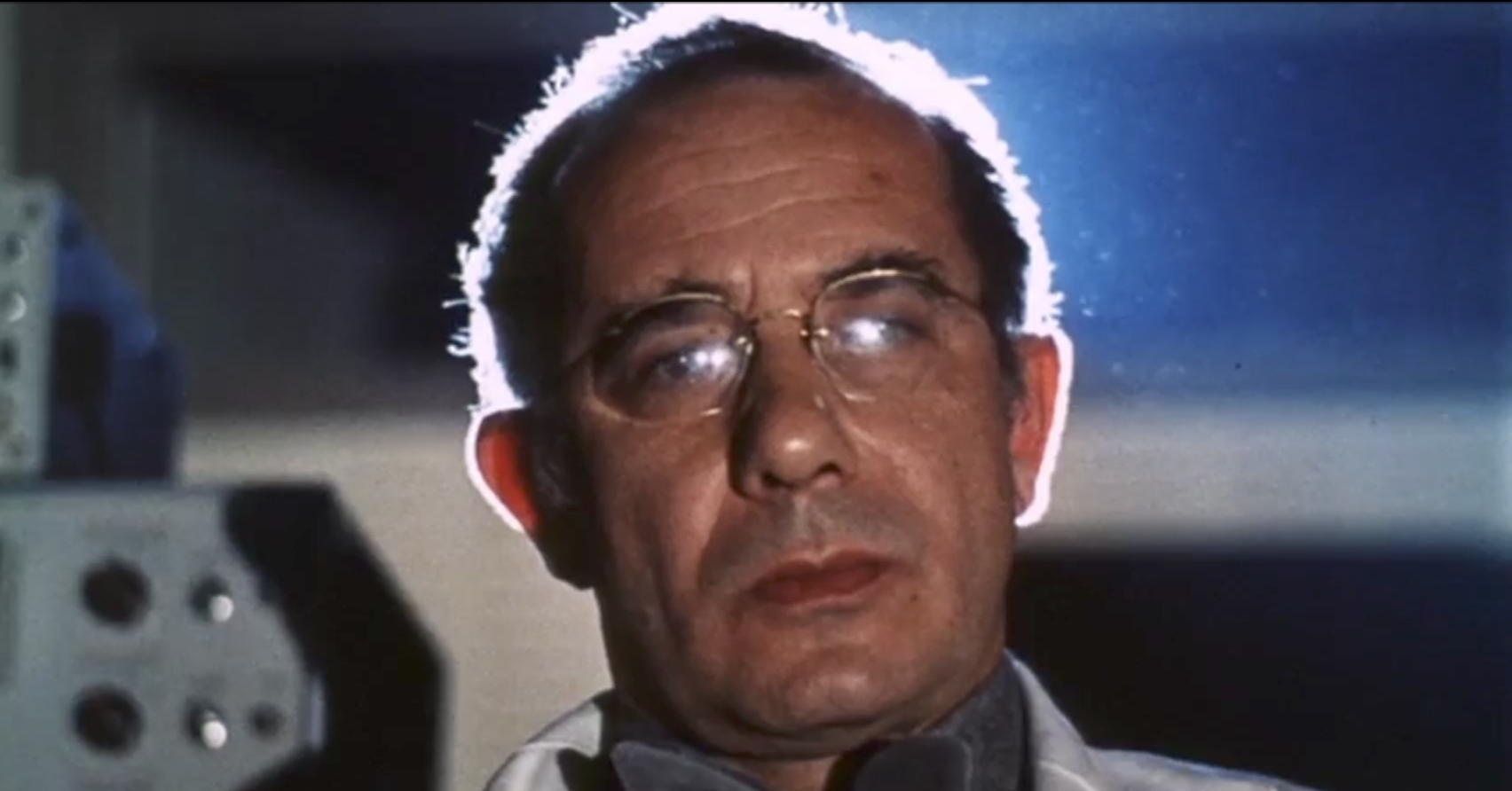
- Duering in a trailer for A Clockwork Orange (1971)
- Born: Gerhard Fuchs; 29 May 1923; Berlin, Germany
- Died: 1 September 2018 (aged 95); London, England
- Occupation: Actor
- Years active: 1953–2000

Gerald Percy Fox (29 May 1923 – 1 September 2018), better known as Carl Duering, was a German-born British actor whose best-known role is as Dr. Brodsky in Stanley Kubrick's A Clockwork Orange. He died in London in September 2018 at the age of 95.

== Selected filmography ==
- Appointment in London (1953) - German Duty Officer (uncredited)
- The Red Beret (1953) - Rossi
- Twist of Fate (1954) - 2nd Sailor (U.S. ' Beautiful Stranger ')
- The Divided Heart (1954) - Postman
- The Colditz Story (1955) - German Officer
- Lets Be Happy (1957) - Customs Inspector
- Seven Thunders (1957) - Major Grautner
- Escapement (1958) - Blore
- Battle of the V-1 (1958) - Scientist
- The Great Van Robbery (1959) - Delgano
- Strip Tease Murder (1961) - Rocco
- The Guns of Navarone (1961) - German Radar Operator (uncredited)
- Fate Takes a Hand (1961) - Mike
- The Main Attraction (1962) - Bus Driver (uncredited)
- Operation Crossbow (1965) - German Officer Arriving at Rocket Plant (uncredited)
- Arabesque (1966) - Hassan Jena
- Duffy (1968) - Bonivet
- Darling Lili (1970) - General Kessler
- Underground (1970) - Stryker
- Rend mig i revolutionen (1970) - Major Bodenschatz
- A Clockwork Orange (1971) - Dr. Brodsky
- King, Queen, Knave (1972) - Enricht
- Gold (1974) - Syndicate Member
- Operation Daybreak (1975) - Karl Hermann Frank
- Voyage of the Damned (1976) - German Ambassador (uncredited)
- Group Portrait with a Lady (1977) - Französischer Offizier (uncredited)
- The Boys from Brazil (1978) - Trausteiner
- Der Sturz (1979)
- Malou (1981) - Rabbi
- Berlin Tunnel 21 (1981) - Klaus Schoenemann
- Possession (1981) - Detective
- Smiley's People (1982) - Walther
- Inside the Third Reich (1982) - Hugo Elsner
- Non-Stop Trouble with Spies (1983) - Dr. Lohmeyer
- Das Wagnis des Arnold Janssen (1983) - Rouard de Card - Dominikanerprovinzial
- War and Remembrance (1988) - Dr. Carl Goerdeler
- Destroying Angel (1990) - Publisher
- Déjà Vu (1997) - Jewellery Shop Owner in Paris
- Saltwater (2000) - Konigsberg (final film role)
