= Birds in Peru =

Birds in Peru is a 1968 French film. It was written and directed by Romain Gary. Gary based it on his own story.

The film concerns a depressed young woman. After she is raped on the beach by a group of sailors, she comes to live with the madam of a nearby brothel, but then leaves to be with an artist who lives close by. Meanwhile, her wealthy estranged husband and his sinister chauffeur search for her.

== Cast ==
- Jean Seberg as Adriana
- Maurice Ronet as Rainier
- Pierre Brasseur as Husband
- Danielle Darrieux as Madame Fernande
- Jean-Pierre Kalfon as Chauffeur
