= Roland Lesaffre =

French actor (1927–2009)

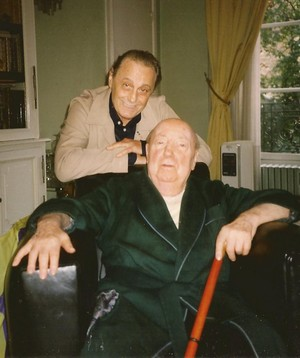
- French actor Roland Lesaffre with French film director Marcel Carné
- Born: 26 June 1927; Clermont-Ferrand, France
- Died: 3 February 2009 (aged 81); Paris, France
- Occupation: Actor

Roland Lesaffre (26 June 1927 – 3 February 2009) was a French film actor. He appeared in many films directed by Marcel Carné.

== Selected filmography ==
- La présidente (1938)
- L'embuscade (1941)
- La Marie du port (1950) - Un marin (uncredited)
- Juliette, or Key of Dreams (1951) - Le légionnaire
- The Strange Madame X (1951) - Roland - le garçon de café (uncredited)
- Paris Is Always Paris (1951)
- Le Plaisir (1952) - Bit part (uncredited)
- Casque d'Or (1952) - Anatole (waiter)
- We Are All Murderers (1952) - Le détenu-coiffeur
- When You Read This Letter (1953) - Roland
- Thérèse Raquin (1953) - Riton, le matelot maître-chanteur
- The Love of a Woman (1953) - Yves
- The Air of Paris (1954) - André Ménard
- To Catch a Thief (1955) - Claude (uncredited)
- If Paris Were Told to Us (1956) - Le premier royaliste
- Law of the Streets (1956) - Le grêle
- Hadashi no seishun (1956) - Father Simenon
- Suspicion (1956) - Raymond Dellez
- Crime and Punishment (1956) - L'ouvrier accusé
- Méfiez-vous fillettes (1957) - Paul
- Filous et compagnie (1957) - Fernand, le chauffeur
- La Bonne Tisane (1958) - Roger
- Le Piège (1958) - Undetermined Role (uncredited)
- Young Sinners (1958) - Roger
- Le 7eme jour de Saint-Malo (1960) - François - un guide malouin
- Amour, Autocar et Boîtes de nuit (1960) - Albert
- Wasteland (1960) - Big Chief
- La Fête espagnole (1961) - Marcel Nancini
- Les Menteurs (1961) - Clement
- Ursus and the Tartar Princess (1961) - Ivan
- Du mouron pour les petits oiseaux (1963) - Monsieur Clec - le tailleur
- The Accident (1963) - Le Goualec
- Les Parias de la gloire (1964) - La Coquille
- Le Bluffeur (1964) - Philippe
- L'étrange auto-stoppeuse (1964)
- The Duke's Gold (1965) - Le chauffeur de la RATP
- Three Rooms in Manhattan (1965) - Pierre
- Pas de panique (1966) - François Toussaint
- Star Pilot (1966) - Prof. Solmi
- The Young Wolves (1968) - Albert
- Le Bal des voyous (1968) - Inspector Fougas
- Traquenards (1969) - Bob
- Le bourgeois gentil mec (1969) - L'inspecteur
- L'amour, oui! Mais... (1970) - Flou-Flou
- Atlantic Wall (1970) - Le faux résistant
- Les enfants de Caïn (1970)
- Les Assassins de l'ordre (1971) - Saugeat
- Les coups pour rien (1971) - Michel
- Kisss..... (1971) - Le flic en civil de Dieppe
- La Merveilleuse Visite (1974) - Ménard
- Maître Pygmalion (1975)
- Il faut vivre dangereusement (1975) - Edouard Lory
- El avispero (1976)
- Arch of Triumph (1980)
- Salut... j'arrive! (1982) - L'agent à la fourrière
- Bernadette (1988) - François Soubirous
- La passion de Bernadette (1990)
- Dames galantes (1990) - Canillac
- Mouche (1991, incomplete) - role unknown

== Bibliography ==
- Edward Baron Turk. Child of Paradise: Marcel Carné and the Golden Age of French Cinema. Harvard University Press, 1989.
