= Marcel Carné =

French film director (1906–1996)

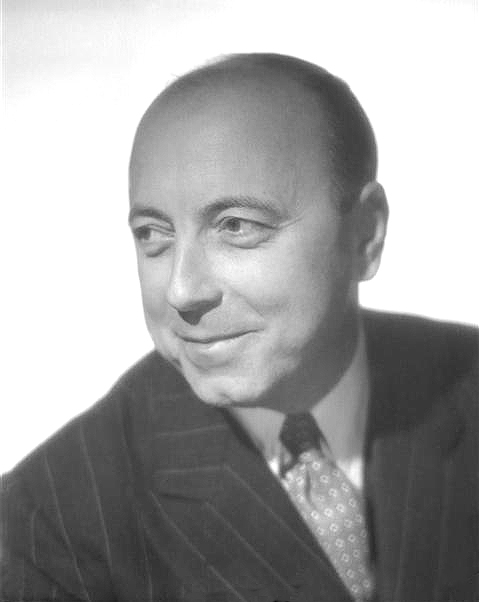
- Carné in 1950
- Born: Marcel Albert Carné; 18 August 1906; Paris, France
- Died: 31 October 1996 (aged 90); Clamart, France
- Years active: 1936–1976
- Awards: Praemium Imperiale(1989)

Marcel Albert Carné (French: [maʁsɛl albɛʁ kaʁne]; 18 August 1906 – 31 October 1996) was a French film director. A key figure in the poetic realism movement, Carné's best known films include Port of Shadows (1938), Le Jour Se Lève (1939), Les Visiteurs du Soir (1942) and Children of Paradise (1945); the latter has been cited as one of the great films of all time.

== Biography ==
Born in Paris, France, the son of a cabinet maker whose wife died when their son was five, Carné began his career as a film critic, becoming editor of the weekly publication, Hebdo-Films, and working for Cinémagazine and Cinémonde between 1929 and 1933. In the same period he worked in silent film as a camera assistant with director Jacques Feyder. By age 25, Carné had already directed Nogent, Eldorado du dimanche (1929), his first short film. He assisted Feyder (and René Clair) on several films through to La kermesse héroïque (1935).

Feyder accepted an invitation to work in England for Alexander Korda, for whom he made Knight Without Armour (1937), but made it possible for Carné to take over his project, Jenny (1936), as its director. The film marked the beginning of a successful collaboration with surrealist poet and screenwriter Jacques Prévert. This collaborative relationship lasted for more than a dozen years, during which Carné and Prévert created their best remembered films. Together, they were involved in the poetic realism film movement of fatalistic tragedies; Ginette Vincendeau said that "the movement's greatest classics are probably Marcel Carné's Le Quai des brumes in 1938 and Le Jour Se Lève in 1939."

Under the German occupation of France during World War II, Carné worked in the Vichy zone where he subverted the regime's attempts to control art; several of his team were Jewish, including Joseph Kosma and set designer Alexandre Trauner. Under difficult conditions they made Carné's most highly regarded film Les Enfants du paradis (Children of Paradise, 1945) released after the Liberation of France. In the late 1990s, the film was voted "Best French Film of the Century" in a poll of 600 French critics and professionals. Post-war, he and Prévert followed this triumph with what at the time was the most expensive production ever undertaken in the history of French film. But the result, titled Les Portes de la nuit, was panned by the critics and a box-office failure and was their last completed film.

By the 1950s, Carné's reputation was in eclipse. The critics of Cahiers du cinéma, who became the film makers of the New Wave, dismissed him and placed his films' merits solely with Prévert. Other than his 1958 hit Young Sinners (Les Tricheurs), Carné's postwar films met with only uneven success and many were greeted by an almost unrelenting negative criticism from the press and within members of the film industry. In 1958, Carné was the Head of the Jury at the 6th Berlin International Film Festival. His 1971 film Law Breakers was entered into the 7th Moscow International Film Festival. Carné made his last film in 1976.

Carné supposedly was homosexual. Several of his films (Hôtel du Nord, Les Visiteurs du soir, Les Enfants du paradis, Le Quai des brumes, L'Air de Paris and La Merveilleuse visite) contain references to male homosexuality or bisexuality. His one-time partner was Roland Lesaffre, who appeared in many of his films.

Edward Baron Turk has published a biography of Carné titled Child of Paradise: Marcel Carné and the Golden Age of French Cinema.

In 1992, Carné attempted to make one more film, Mouche, adapted from the Guy de Maupassant story. However, he became ill during early production stages, and financing was withdrawn. Carné died in 1996 in Clamart, Hauts-de-Seine, and he was buried in the Cimetière Saint-Vincent in Montmartre.

== Filmography as director ==
- Nogent, Eldorado du dimanche (1929, documentary short)
- Jenny (1936)
- Drôle de drame (1937)
- Le Quai des brumes (1938)
- Hôtel du Nord (1938)
- Le jour se lève (1939)
- Les Visiteurs du soir (1942)
- Children of Paradise (1945)
- Gates of the Night (1946)
- La Fleur de l'âge (1947, unfinished)
- La Marie du port (1950)
- Juliette ou la Clé des songes (1951)
- Thérèse Raquin (1953)
- The Air of Paris (1954)
- Le Pays d'où je viens (1956)
- Les tricheurs (1958)
- Terrain vague (1960)
- Du mouron pour les petits oiseaux (1963)
- Trois chambres à Manhattan (1965)
- The Young Wolves (1968)
- Les Assassins de l'ordre (1971)
- La merveilleuse visite (1974)
- La Bible (1977, documentary)
- Mouche (1992, unfinished)
