= Edward Baron Turk =

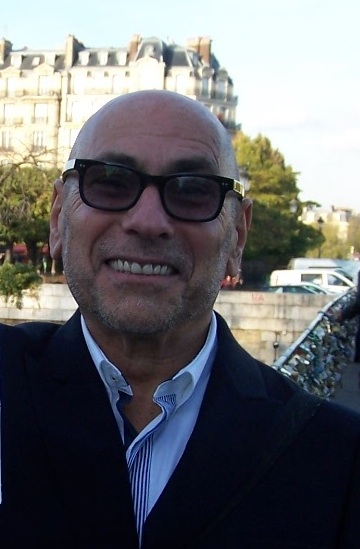
- Born: September 29, 1946 (age 80); Brooklyn, New York
- Awards: Chevalier in the Order of Arts and Letters (France, 1995); Officier in the Order of Academic Palms (France, 2013)
- Website: http://web.mit.edu/ebturk/

Edward Baron Turk (born September 29, 1946) is a multiple prize-winning American author, arts critic, and educator. He has held professorial positions at Yale University, the Massachusetts Institute of Technology (MIT), Columbia University (School of the Arts), and the Institut des Etudes Politiques ("Sciences Po," Paris). He writes mainly on the culture of France – especially its theatre, cinema, and literature – and on Hollywood film. As an author, he has been largely collected by libraries.

== Books ==
- Baroque Fiction-Making, University of North Carolina Press (1978), ISBN 978-0-80789-196-4.
- Child of Paradise: Marcel Carné and the Golden Age of French Cinema, Harvard University Press (1989), ISBN 978-0-67411-460-9.
- Hollywood Diva: A Biography of Jeanette MacDonald, University of California Press (1998), ISBN 978-0-52021-202-2.
- Marcel Carné et l'âge d'or du cinéma français, L'Harmattan [Paris] (2003), ISBN 978-2-74752-492-6.
- French Theater Today: The View from New York, Paris, and Avignon, University of Iowa Press (2011), ISBN 978-1-58729-992-6.

== Awards ==
- Prize, Theatre Library Association, for the book Child of Paradise (1990)
- Selected, author of "one of the best books of 1998" by the Philadelphia Inquirer for Hollywood Diva (1998)
- Finalist, Kurt Weill Foundation Book Prize, for Hollywood Diva (1999)
