= Georges Marchal =

French actor

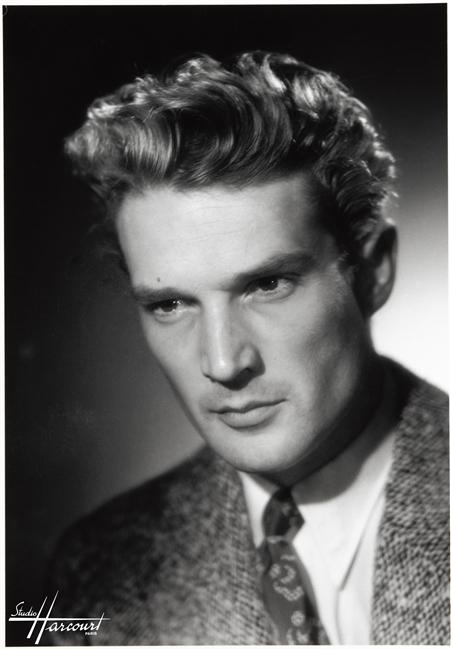
Georges Marchal, 1948

Georges Marchal (10 January 1920 – 28 November 1997) was a French actor.

Born Georges Louis Lucot in Nancy, Meurthe-et-Moselle, France, the strikingly handsome Marchal was discovered in the early-1940s by director Jean Grémillon. By the early 1950s, he had become one of the top male stars of French cinema, second only, perhaps, to actor Jean Marais. He was also a favorite leading man of filmmaker Luis Buñuel, appearing in the director's films La voie lactée, Belle de jour, Cela s'appelle l'aurore, and La mort en ce jardin.

In 1951, Marchal married French actress Dany Robin and together they were a popular couple, playing in the movies La Passagère (1949), La Voyageuse inattendue, Le plus joli péché du monde, Jupiter directed by Gilles Grangier (1952), and Quand sonnera midi directed by Edmond T. Gréville (1958).

On television, Marchal played Claude Jade's father in the TV-series The Island of Thirty Coffins, and appeared as Richelieu, and Philippe IV, and in adaptations of Balzac, Hugo, George Sand and Colette.

Divorced from Dany Robin since 1969, Marchal married Michele Heyberger in 1983. He had two children, Robin and Frédérique. Marchal retired in 1989 and died, age 77, on 28 November 1997 in Maurens, Dordogne, France.

== Filmography ==
=== Film ===
Year	Title	Role	Director	Cast	Notes
1941	Premier rendez-vous	Jean de Vaugelas	Henri Decoin	Danielle Darrieux, Louis Jourdan	Uncredited
1942	Le Lit à colonnes	Olivier de Verrières	Roland Tual	Fernand Ledoux	
1942	The Man Who Played with Fire	Bernard	Jean de Limur		writer: Pierre Bost
1942	Summer Light	Julien	Jean Grémillon	Madeleine Renaud, Pierre Brasseur, Madeleine Robinson	writer: Jacques Prévert
1943	Vautrin	Lucien de Rubempré	Pierre Billon	Michel Simon, Madeleine Sologne	novel: Honoré de Balzac, screenplay: Pierre Benoît, Pierre Billon
1943	Pamela	René Bergerin	Pierre de Hérain	Fernand Gravey, Renée Saint-Cyr	novel: Victorien Sardou
1945	False Alarm	Bernard Dalban	Jacques de Baroncelli	Josephine Baker, Micheline Presle	
1945	Blondine	Astara	Henri Mahé	Nicole Maurey, Michèle Philippe	
1946	Dawn Devils	Lieutenant Claude Legrand	Yves Allégret	Simone Signoret	
1947	The Seventh Door	Ali	André Zwoboda		
1947	Torrents	Yann Getersen	Serge de Poligny		
1947	Bethsabée	Capitaine Georges Dubreuil	Léonide Moguy	Danielle Darrieux, Jean Murat, Paul Meurisse	novel: Pierre Benoît
1948	La figure de proue	François Martineau	Christian Stengel		
1949	Last Love	Alain Fontenay	Jean Stelli	Annabella, Jean Debucourt	writer: Françoise Giroud
1949	At the Grand Balcony	Jean Fabien	Henri Decoin	Pierre Fresnay	writer: Joseph Kessel
1949	The Passenger	Pierre Kerjean	Jacques Daroy	Dany Robin	
1950	The Unexpected Voyager	Marc Lanson	Jean Stelli		
1950	The Last Days of Pompeii	Lysias	Marcel L'Herbier	Micheline Presle	
1950	Thirst of Men	Sergent Léon Bouvard	Serge de Poligny	Dany Robin	
1951	The Prettiest Sin in the World	Jacques Lebreton	Gilles Grangier		
1951	Gigolo	Marceau Le Guern	Roger Richebé	Arletty, Nicole Courcel	writers: Jean Aurenche, Maurice Blondeau
1951	The Seven Dwarfs to the Rescue	The Black Prince	Paolo William Tamburella	Rossana Podestà	
1951	Messalina	Gaius Silius	Carmine Gallone	María Félix	
1952	Twelve Hours of Happiness	Jupiter' L'inconnu - l'évadé de lasile psychiatrique	Gilles Grangier		
1953	Les amours finissent à l'aube	Didier Guéret	Henri Calef		
1953	Les Trois Mousquetaires	D'Artagnan	André Hunebelle	Yvonne Sanson, Gino Cervi, Bourvil, Claude Dauphin	novel: Alexandre Dumas, screenplay and dialogue: Michel Audiard
1954	Royal Affairs in Versailles	Louis XIV	Sacha Guitry	Sacha Guitry, Claudette Colbert, Orson Welles, Édith Piaf, Jean Marais, Gérard Philipe, Micheline Presle	Marchal plays the young Louis XIV - and Guitry the older king
1954	Theodora, Slave Empress	Justinian I	Riccardo Freda	Gianna Maria Canale, Irene Papas	
1954	The Contessa's Secret	Lucio Falengo	Georges Combret	Yvonne De Carlo, Paul Meurisse, Rossano Brazzi	
1954	The Count of Bragelonne	Raoul de Bragelonne	Fernando Cerchio	Dawn Addams, Jacques Dumesnil	novel: Alexandre Dumas, adaptation: Alexandre Astruc
1954	La soupe à la grimace	Frank Keany	Jean Sacha	Maria Mauban, Dominique Wilms	
1955	Eighteen Hour Stopover	L'inspecteur Bério	René Jolivet		
1955	Cherchez la femme	Paul Mercier	Raoul André		
1956	The Adventures of Gil Blas	Gil Blas	René Jolivet	Barbara Laage, Jacques Castelot	novel: Alain-René Lesage
1956	Cela s'appelle l'aurore	Doctor Valerio	Luis Buñuel	Lucia Bosé	novel: Emmanuel Roblès
1956	Death in the Garden	Shark	Luis Buñuel	Simone Signoret, Charles Vanel, Michel Piccoli	
1957	Marchands de filles	Mister John	Maurice Cloche		
1958	Girls of the Night	Charly	Maurice Cloche	Nicole Berger	
1958	Quand sonnera midi	Michel Dumartin	Edmond T. Gréville		
1958	The Warrior and the Slave Girl	Asclepius	Vittorio Cottafavi	Gianna Maria Canale, Ettore Manni	
1959	Sheba and the Gladiator	Consul Marcus Valerius	Guido Brignone	Anita Ekberg, Chelo Alonso, Gino Cervi, Jacques Sernas	writer : Sergio Leone
1959	Winter Holidays	Georges Tardier	Camillo Mastrocinque	Alberto Sordi, Michèle Morgan, Vittorio De Sica	
1959	Wild Cats on the Beach	Maurice Mont-Bret	Vittorio Sala	Alberto Sordi, Giovanna Ralli, Elsa Martinelli	
1959	Legions of the Nile	Mark Antony	Vittorio Cottafavi	Linda Cristal, Ettore Manni	
1960	Prisonniers de la brousse	Fred Hersant	Willy Rozier		
1960	The Dam on the Yellow River	John Bell	Renzo Merusi	Anita Ekberg	
1960	Austerlitz	Maréchal Jean Lannes	Abel Gance	Pierre Mondy, Orson Welles, Jack Palance, Jean Marais, Claudia Cardinale, Vittorio De Sica, Leslie Caron	
1961	The Colossus of Rhodes	Peliocles	Sergio Leone	Rory Calhoun, Lea Massari	
1961	Napoleon II, the Eagle	General Gustav von Neipperg	Claude Boissol	Bernard Verley, Jean Marais	novel: André Castelot
1962	Ulysses Against the Son of Hercules	Ulysses	Mario Caiano	Mike Lane	
1962	The Secret Mark of D'Artagnan	Duke of Montserrat	Siro Marcellini	George Nader, Magali Noël, Massimo Serato	
1962	Le Naufragé du Pacifique	Robinson Crusoe	Jeff Musso		
1964	L'étrange auto-stoppeuse		Jean Darcy		
1965	The Dirty Game	Serge	Terence Young, Christian-Jaque, Carlo Lizzani	Henry Fonda, Robert Ryan, Bourvil, Annie Girardot, Robert Hossein, Vittorio Gassman, Peter van Eyck	
1966	Dacii	Cornelius Fuscus	Sergiu Nicolaescu	Pierre Brice, Marie-José Nat	
1967	Belle de Jour	Duke	Luis Buñuel	Catherine Deneuve, Jean Sorel, Michel Piccoli	
1969	The Milky Way	The Jesuit	Luis Buñuel	Paul Frankeur, Laurent Terzieff	
1972	Faustine et le Bel Été	Julien	Nina Companeez	Muriel Catala	
1977	Closet Children	Father	Benoît Jacquot	Brigitte Fossey, Lou Castel, Jean Sorel	
1982	A Captain's Honor	General Keller	Pierre Schoendoerffer	Nicole Garcia, Jacques Perrin, Georges Wilson, Charles Denner	

=== Television ===
Year	Title	Role	Director	Cast	Notes
1969	Tout pour le mieux	Salvo Manfroni	Jeannette Hubert	Jean Desailly, Giani Esposito, Denise Grey, Eléonore Hirt	play: Luigi Pirandello
1970	Le lys dans la vallée	M. de Mortsauf	Marcel Cravenne	Delphine Seyrig, Richard Leduc, Alexandra Stewart	novel: Honoré de Balzac
1971	Quentin Durward	Crèvecoeur	Gilles Grangier	Amadeus August, Marie-France Boyer	novel: Sir Walter Scott
1971	L'homme qui rit	Lord David	Jean Kerchbron		novel: Victor Hugo
1972	Les six hommes en question	Major Lytton	Abder Isker		play: Frédéric Dard and Robert Hossein
1972	Les Rois maudits (The Accursed Kings)	Philippe le Bel	Claude Barma		
1974	Paul et Virginie	The governor	Pierre Gaspard-Huit	Véronique Jannot	novel: Henri Bernardin de Saint-Pierre
1976	The Gallant Lords of Bois-Doré	Sylvain de Bois Doré	Bernard Borderie	Yolande Folliot, Michel Albertini, Philippe Lemaire, François Maistre, Jean-François Poron	novel: George Sand
1977	Vaincre à Olympie	Milo of Croton	Michel Subiela	Jean Marais	
1978	Claudine	Renaud	Edouard Molinaro	Marie-Hélène Breillat, Jean Desailly	novel: Colette and Willy, adaptation : Danièle Thompson
1978	Gaston Phébus	Corbeyran	Bernard Borderie	Jean-Claude Drouot, France Dougnac, Nicole Garcia	novel: Gaston et Myriam de Béarn
1979	The Island of Thirty Coffins	Antoine d'Hergemont	Marcel Cravenne	Claude Jade	novel : Maurice Leblanc
1981	Cinq-Mars	Richelieu	Jean-Claude Brialy	Pierre Vaneck, Paul Blain, Madeleine Robinson, Jacques Duby	writers: Jean-Claude Brialy and Didier Decoin
1981	Maigret se trompe	Professor Gouin	Stéphane Bertin	Jean Richard, Macha Méril	novel: Georges Simenon
1985	Meurtres pour mémoire	Pasquier	Laurent Heynemann	Christine Boisson, Christophe Malavoy	novel: Didier Daeninckx
1985	Châteauvallon	Gilbert Bossis		Chantal Nobel, Luc Merenda, Raymond Pellegrin	
1986	Le coeur cambriolé	Professor Thurel	Michel Subiela		short story: Gaston Leroux
1989	Les grandes familles	Urbain de la Monnerie	Edouard Molinaro	Michel Piccoli, Pierre Arditi, Roger Hanin, Evelyne Bouix, Jean Desailly, Bulle Ogier	novel and screenplay: Maurice Druon (final appearance)
