= Les Parents terribles (disambiguation) =

Les Parents terribles is a 1938 French play written by Jean Cocteau.

Les Parents terribles may also refer to:

- Les Parents terribles (1948 film), written and directed by Cocteau, featuring the cast from the 1946 Paris stage production
- Les Parents terribles (1980 film), a French TV film directed by Yves-André Hubert

== See also ==
- Intimate Relations (1953 film), a British film version of Cocteau's play directed by Charles Frank
