= Raymond Gérôme =

French actor (1920–2002)

- Born: Raymond Joseph Léon De Backer; 17 May 1920; Koekelberg, Belgium
- Died: 3 February 2002 (aged 81); Les Lilas, France
- Occupation: Actor
- Years active: 1946–2000

Raymond Gérôme (17 May 1920 — 3 February 2002) was a Belgian-born, French stage and screen actor.

Gérôme was born as Raymond Joseph Léon De Backer in Koekelberg. He made his first stage appearance in 1946, in a stage production of Jeanne d'Arc au bûcher and he entered films in 1954. He is best known to English speaking audiences for his roles as The Commander in The Brain and Inspector Renard in The Greengage Summer. In later life, he lent his voice to dubbing - he provided the voice of Governor Ratcliffe in the French release of Pocahontas.

In 1982 he was awarded a Pix du Brigadier for his performance in L'Extravagant Mister Wilde.

Gérôme died in 2002, at his home in Les Lilas.

== Selected filmography ==
- 1954: One Step to Eternity - Un client de la boîte
- 1955: L'Affaire des poisons - Le roi Louis XIV (uncredited)
- 1957: Élisa - Villedieu
- 1957: Méfiez-vous fillettes - Jacques
- 1957: Mademoiselle and Her Gang - L'avocat
- 1957: Dangerous Exile - Citizen-Director of the Revolution
- 1960: Murder at 45 R.P.M. - Le commissaire
- 1961: La Princesse de Clèves - Le Roi
- 1961: The Greengage Summer - Inspector Renard
- 1961: Goodbye Again - Jimmy (uncredited)
- 1961: Le Cœur battant - Pierre
- 1961: Napoleon II, the Eagle - Apponyi
- 1961: The Triumph of Michael Strogoff
- 1962: La Dénonciation - Patrice de Laborde
- 1962: Le Masque de fer - Pimentel
- 1965: Dis-moi qui tuer - La voix au téléphone (voix seulement) (voice)
- 1966: The Second Twin - Le juge
- 1967: The Night of the Generals - Colonel (War Room)
- 1967: Lagardère - Philippe d'Orléans (TV series)
- 1967: Lettre à Carla
- 1968: A Little Virtuous - Kerman
- 1969: The Brain - The Commander
- 1969: Under the Sign of the Bull - Jérôme Laprade - le beau-frère d'Albert
- 1970: Tropic of Cancer - M. Le Censeur
- 1970: Céleste - Le chef des barbouzes français
- 1971: The Deadly Trap - Commissaire Chameille
- 1972: Travels with My Aunt - Mario
- 1973: La belle affaire - Genève
- 1973: Le complot - Vignaud
- 1973: The Day of the Jackal - Flavigny
- 1973: A Slightly Pregnant Man - Gérard Chaumont de Latour
- 1973: Un ange au paradis - Basset
- 1973: Le Magnifique - General Pontaubert
- 1975: Divine - Le garçon de café
- 1977: Le portrait de Dorian Gray - Lord Henry Wotton
- 1977: Tendre poulet - Director of Criminal Division
- 1977: Animal - Count of Saint-Prix
- 1978: L'Exercice du pouvoir - Georges Argand
- 1980: The Umbrella Coup - President of RG
- 1981: Julien Fontanes, magistrat - Jean-Claude Lorentzen
- 1988: Let Sleeping Cops Lie - Cazalieres
- 1989: La Révolution française - Jacques Necker (segment "Années Lumière, Les")
- 1991: L'Opération Corned-Beef - Ghislain Chauffereau
- 1991: Money - Morf
- 2000: Sade - President of Maussane (final film role)

== French dubbing ==
- 1963: The Pink Panther - Tucker
- 1964: My Fair Lady - Professor Higgins
- 1967: Doctor Dolittle - Doctor Dolittle
- 1968: The Devil Rides Out - Duke de Richleau
- 1973: Live and Let Die - Tee Hee
- 1978: Watership Down - General Woundwort
- 1986: Big Trouble in Little China - Lo Pan
- 1989: The Return of the Musketeers - Count de Rochefort
- 1991: Robin Hood: Prince of Thieves - Sheriff of Nottingham
- 1991: An American Tail: Fievel Goes West - Cat R. Waul
- 1992: Tom and Jerry: The Movie - Lickboot
- 1995: Pocahontas - Governor Ratcliffe
- 1996: Spy Hard - General Rancor

== Bibliography ==
- Yvan Foucart, Dictionnaire des comédiens français disparus, Éditions cinéma, Mormoiron, 2008, 1185 p. ISBN 978-2-9531-1390-7
