= Billard Nicolas =

French board game

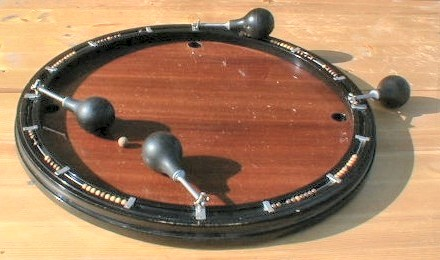
- Manufacturers: Jean-Anatole Jost (1895)
- Designers: Nicolas Redler
- Publication: 1894; 131 years ago
- Players: 4
- Playing time: 15 minutes
- Age range: 6 and up

Billard Nicolas is a board game of skill in the billiards family, invented by Nicolas Redler in France in 1894.

== Origins ==
Nicolas Redler (1851–1919) is the French inventor of the Billard Nicolas table, patented in France on July 30, 1894 for a term of 15 years under number 240396. A brief summary of the game was included in the March 15, 1895 edition of the French journal L'Ingenieur Civil which explains that "the game consists of a table with a rim, in which are cavities each defended by a player who must prevent a ball thrown on the table from falling into this cavity."

In 1895, the Billard Nicolas table was manufactured by Jean-Anatole Jost, then located at 120 rue Oberkampf in Paris.

In his history of Épinay-sur-Seine, André Clipet mentions that Nicolas Redler did not earn much from this invention.

In 1899, he bought at Épinay-sur-Seine a piece of land on which he had an establishment built, which he named Billard Nicolas, including a café, a dance hall and some lodgings; the building has a mosaic on the facade representing a Nicolas billiard table above a clock partly hidden by a terrace built afterwards. Thus was born the establishment held until his death in 1919, by its creator Nicolas Redler and whose name extended to the district which was then built all around. But, since 1956, we no longer dance at "Billard Nicolas", transformed into a service station for cars. Since the service station was replaced by a garage before finally being replaced by a store selling spare parts for cars.

— André Clipet, Épinay-sur-Seine, its history, Boudin, Paris, 1970

== Material ==
The game board is made of wood, in the form of a circular track, bordered by a band provided with four supports, each supporting a bellows that can pivot freely, which is used to blow balls on the table. Today, other game boards may have three and six holes, for as many players.

In Anglo-Saxon countries, the game may be known as puff billiards or pneumatic billiards.

== Game play ==
The game is played by four players, who try to direct – by projecting jets of air – a small cork ball towards one of the opposing holes, and to prevent it from falling into theirs.

Each ball lodged costs one point to the player who received it. He then tosses the ball back on the game board and the game continues.

The game ends when one player has achieved an agreed-upon number of points, and the player with the fewest number of points wins the game.

== In arts and culture ==
=== Literature ===
- Pierre Bost, Le Scandale, Gallimard, Paris, 1931, p.377 : "It was nearly four o'clock in the morning; several bridge tables were occupied; in a corner they were playing Nicolas billiards, a game which Jean had made fashionable, in the basement of the Belle Ferronniere."

=== Cinema ===
- The game appeared in the 1952 film Adorables créatures by Christian-Jaque.
