= Voice of Silence (1953 film) =

1953 film

- Film poster
- Directed by: G. W. Pabst
- Written by: Giuseppe Berto, Oreste Biancoli, Pierre Bost, Roland Laudenbach, G. W. Pabst, Tullio Pinelli, Giorgio Prosperi, Ákos Tolnay
- Produced by: Silvio D'Amico
- Starring: Aldo Fabrizi
- Cinematography: Gábor Pogány
- Edited by: Eraldo Da Roma
- Music by: Enzo Masetti
- Production companies: Società Italiana Cines; Franco London Films
- Distributed by: Lux Film (Italy); Discifilm (France)
- Release date: 29 April 1953 (France)
- Running time: 110 minutes
- Countries: Italy; France
- Language: Italian
- Box office: 737,751 admissions (France)

Voice of Silence (Italian: La voce del silenzio; French: La Maison du silence) is a 1953 French-Italian drama film directed by G. W. Pabst, written by Giuseppe Berto, starring Aldo Fabrizi and Jean Marais. The film's sets were designed by the art director Guido Fiorini. It was shot at the Cinecittà Studios in Rome, Italy.

== Plot ==
A group of people, to try to make sense of their existence, retreats to a convent because each has problems considered insurmountable: a war veteran who is given up for dead returns from captivity in a sensational way and once home he finds his wife married and happy with another man; a partisan, during a war action, causes the death of three people; a votive candle dealer is too selfish to practice his trade. Then a writer famous for his production of works for adults arrive at the convent through which, according to many detractors, he corrupts many young minds, and a young priest who, dismayed by such a tumult of souls, is seized by mistrust regarding his vocation. At the end of the stay, everyone will leave, both those strengthened in their convictions and those who remain with their character and decide to continue their previous life.

== Cast ==
- Aldo Fabrizi as Pio Fabiani
- Jean Marais as L'ancien maquisard
- Daniel Gélin as L'ancien prisonnier
- Cosetta Greco as Femme du prisonnier
- Franck Villard as L'écrivain
- Antonio Crast as Padre predicatore
- Eduardo Ciannelli as Padre superiore
- Paolo Panelli as Renato Santini
- Fernando Fernán Gómez as Fernando Layer
- Maria Grazia Francia as Pieta
- Checco Durante as Sacrestano
- Paolo Stoppa
- Rossana Podestà
- Enrico Luzi
- Franco Scandurra
- Pina Piovani

== Bibliography ==
- Rentschler, Eric. The Films of G.W. Pabst: An Extraterritorial Cinema. Rutgers University Press, 1990.
