= Jean Marais =

French actor, writer, director and sculptor (1913–1998)

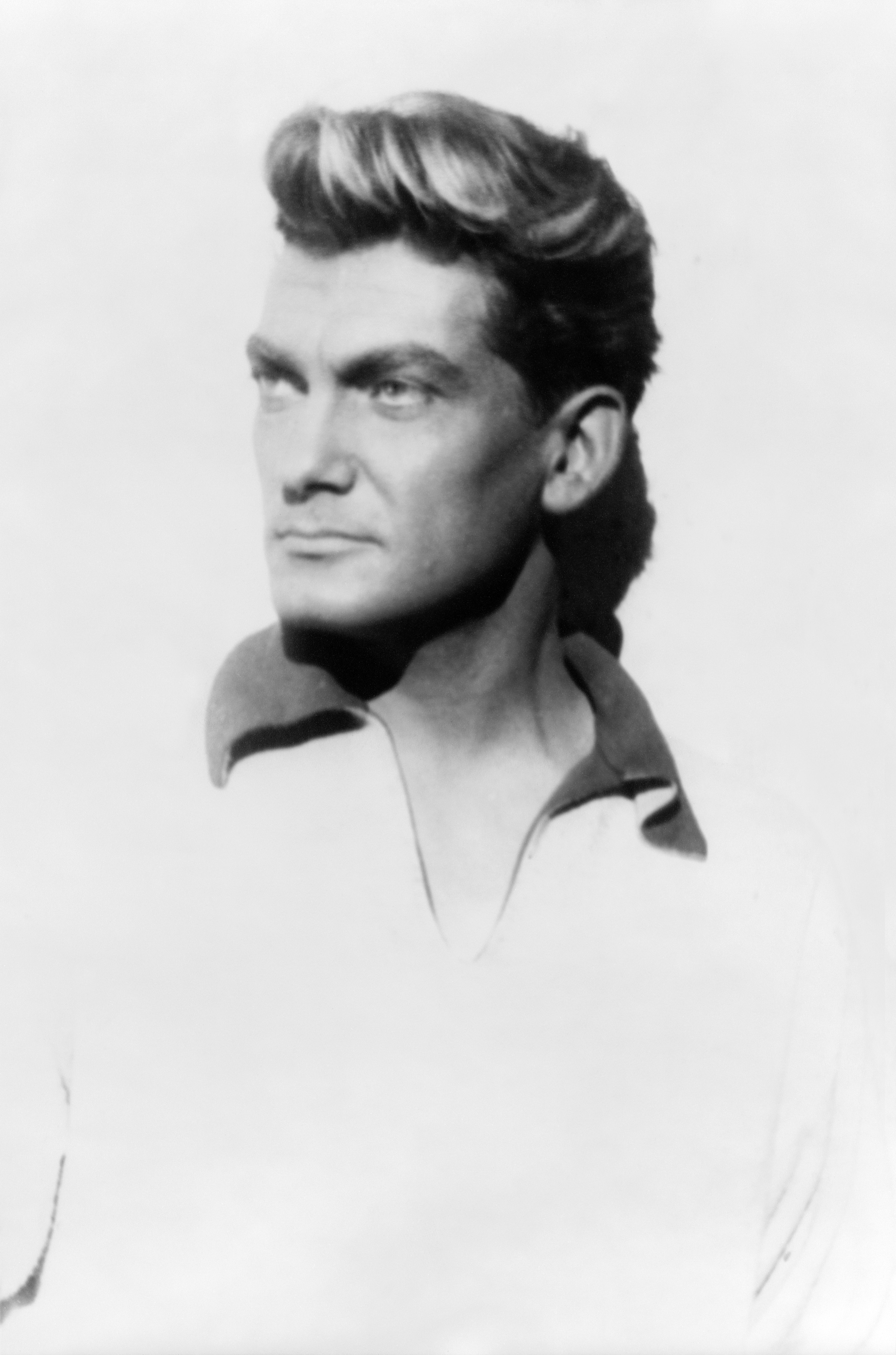
- Photograph by Carl Van Vechten, 1949
- Born: Jean-Alfred Villain-Marais; 11 December 1913; Cherbourg, France
- Died: 8 November 1998 (aged 84); Cannes, France
- Occupations: Actor; director; painter; sculptor; visual artist; writer; photographer
- Years active: 1933–1996
- Partners: Jean Cocteau (1937–1947); Mila Parély (1942–1946); Georges Reich (1948–1959)
- Children: 1

Jean-Alfred Villain-Marais (11 December 1913 – 8 November 1998), known professionally as Jean Marais (French: [ʒɑ̃ maʁɛ]), was a French actor, theatre director, painter, sculptor, visual artist, writer and photographer. In 1937, Marais became the lover of acclaimed poet, playwright and film director Jean Cocteau, who considered him his muse and directed him in multiple plays and films, notably Beauty and the Beast (1946). Following their relationship, Marais and Cocteau remained close friends and Marais later endeavored to keep Cocteau's legacy alive. During the post-war period, Marais was one of France's major film stars and performed in various successful swashbuckler films. In 1996, he was awarded the French Legion of Honor for his contributions to French cinema.

== Early life ==
A native of Cherbourg, France, Marais was a son of Alfred Emmanuel Victor Paul Villain-Marais, a veterinarian, and his wife, the former Aline Marie Louise Vassord. Having recently lost a two-year-old daughter Madeleine, Aline was very disappointed when she gave birth to a boy. She came to accept him but until Jean was six or seven years old his mother raised him as if he were a girl, dressing him like one and giving him dolls to play with. Sometimes Aline was mysteriously absent from home. When he was eighteen, Marais became aware that his mother was a kleptomaniac and that she had been imprisoned for several months or even years in her lifetime.

== Career ==
=== Early films ===
Marais' first role was an uncredited bit in On the Streets (1933) and he was in Etienne (1933). Filmmaker Marcel L'Herbier put him in The Sparrowhawk (1933) with Charles Boyer; The Scandal (1934), with Gaby Morlay; Happiness (1934) again with Boyer, The Venturer (1934) with Victor Francen; The New Men (1934) with Harry Baur; and Nights of Fire (1937) with Morlay and Francen.

Marcel Carné gave Marais a small role in Bizarre, Bizarre (1937) and the actor was in Abused Confidence (1937) by Henri Decoin; The Patriot (1938), a biopic of Paul I of Russia with Baur, directed by Maurice Tourneur; and Remontons les Champs-Élysées (1938) directed by Sacha Guitry.

=== Jean Cocteau ===
Marais performed in a 1937 stage production of Oedipe directed by Charles Dullin, where he was seen by Jean Cocteau. Marais impressed Cocteau, who cast the actor in his play Les Chevaliers de la table ronde.

Marais appeared in Cocteau's play Les Parents terribles (1938), supposedly based on Marais' home life, which was a great success.

Marais had bigger film parts in The Pavilion Burns (1941) directed by Jacques de Baroncelli, and The Four Poster (1942) directed by Roland Tual.

On stage he appeared in La Machine à ecrire (1941) by Cocteau and he directed and designed Racine's Britannicus (1941). He performed briefly with the Comédie-Française. In 1941, after Alain Laubreaux, theater critic for the collaborationist newspaper Je suis partout, wrote an insulting review of La Machine à écrire which alluded to Cocteau's sexuality and drug usage, Marais personally beat up Laubreaux. Cocteau had to personally intervene to prevent reprisals against Marais.

Following the liberation of Paris, Marais enlisted in the Free French Forces and left acting for a time to fight in Alsace, winning the Croix de Guerre.

=== Stardom ===
Marais' first film as leading man was The Eternal Return (1943), a re-telling of Tristan and Isolde set in 1940s France, written by Jean Cocteau. It was directed by Jean Delannoy and co-starred Madeleine Sologne. It was popular and made him a star.

Marais was the male lead in Voyage Without Hope (1943) with Simone Renant directed by Christian-Jaque.

Christian-Jaque also directed Marais in Carmen (1944) with Viviane Romance. This was one of the most popular films in France when it was released.

=== Beauty and the Beast and Jean Cocteau ===
Marais became a star in Beauty and the Beast (1946), written and directed by Cocteau.

He performed in a popular revival of Cocteau's 1938 play Les Parents terribles on stage.

Marais' next films were The Royalists (1947), a historical adventure film directed by Henri Calef from a novel by Balzac; and Ruy Blas (1948) with Danielle Darrieux, from a play by Victor Hugo and script by Cocteau, directed by Pierre Billon.

Marais' second film with Cocteau as director was The Eagle with Two Heads (1948) with Edwige Feuillère. He did To the Eyes of Memory (1948) with Michèle Morgan for director Jean Delannoy, a big commercial success, then Les Parents Terribles (1949) for Cocteau again.

Marais was reunited with Delannoy for The Secret of Mayerling (1949), about the Mayerling incident. He did Orpheus (1950) with Cocteau, which was soon regarded as a classic.

=== Post-Cocteau stardom ===
Marais and Morgan were in The Glass Castle (1950) directed by René Clément. Marais did two films for Yves Allégret: Miracles Only Happen Once (1951) with Alida Valli and Leathernose (1952).

Marais was in L'appel du destin (1953) for Georges Lacombe; The Lovers of Midnight (1953) for Roger Richebé; Voice of Silence (1953), an Italian film from G. W. Pabst; Inside a Girls' Dormitory (1953); Julietta (1953) for Marc Allégret with Dany Robin and Jeanne Moreau; the all-star Boum sur Paris (1953); and The Faith Healer (1954).

Marais starred in a version of The Count of Monte Cristo (1954) that was hugely popular. He then made some all-star Guitry films, Royal Affairs in Versailles (1954), Napoleon (1955) (playing Charles Tristan, marquis de Montholon) and If Paris Were Told to Us (1956); School for Love (1955) for Allegret, with a young Brigitte Bardot, a box office flop; Kiss of Fire (1956) for Robert Darène; and The Whole Town Accuses (1956).

Marais was Ingrid Bergman's co-star in Elena and Her Men (1956) directed Jean Renoir, with also Mel Ferrer. He followed it with Typhoon Over Nagasaki (1957) with Darrieux; S.O.S. Noronha (1957); White Nights (1957) for Luchino Visconti, with Maria Schell and Marcello Mastroianni; Girl in His Pocket (1958); King on Horseback (1958); Every Day Has Its Secret (1958); and the all-star Life Together (1958).

=== Swashbuckler star ===
Marais starred in the swashbuckler Le Bossu (1959), appearing alongside Bourvil and directed by André Hunebelle which was a mammoth hit launched a new stage of his career. He was reunited with Cocteau for Testament of Orpheus (1960). He played Lazare Carnot in the all-star The Battle of Austerlitz (1960), then was reunited with Bourvil and Hunebelle in another swashbuckler, Captain Blood (1960).

He did Princess of Cleves (1961) for Delannoy with Marina Vlady based on a script by Cocteau. It was back to swashbuckling with Captain Fracasse (1961) for director Pierre Gaspard-Huit, and Blood on His Sword (1961) for Hunebelle.

Marais had a supporting role in Napoléon II, l'aiglon (1962) then did some films in Italy: Romulus and the Sabines (1962) with Roger Moore, and Pontius Pilate (1962), where Marais played the title role alongside Jeanne Crain and Basil Rathbone.

He was reunited with Hunebelle for The Mysteries of Paris (1962), then did The Iron Mask (1962) for Decoin.

=== Spy films and Fantomas ===
The success of the James Bond films saw Marais cast in an espionage movie, The Reluctant Spy (1963) for director Jean-Charles Dudrumet. He did a comedy, Friend of the Family (1964), then had a huge box office success with Fantomas (1964), playing the villain and hero, under the direction of Hunebelle.

In 1963, he was a member of the jury at the 3rd Moscow International Film Festival.

Marais did Ivory Coast Adventure (1965) directed by Christian-Jaque; Killer Spy (1965), directed by Georges Lampin; a sequel to The Reluctant Spy; and Operation Double Cross (1965), a spy film; then a Fantomas sequel, Fantomas Unleashed (1965).

He played Simon Templar in The Saint Lies in Wait (1966) for Christian-Jaque, and a French general in Seven Guys and a Gal (1967), directed by Bernard Borderie. Fantomas vs. Scotland Yard (1967) was the third and final Fantomas, with Hunebelle.

Marais went on to appear in Le Paria (1969); Renaud et Armide (1969), based on a play by Cocteau; and Le jouet criminel (1969), a short.

=== 1970s ===
After 1970, Marais preferred concentrating on his stage work, and his movie performances became fewer.

His film credits included La provocation (1970); Donkey Skin (1970) with Catherine Deneuve, directed by Jacques Demy; and Robert Macaire (1971) for French TV.

He was in the miniseries Karatekas and co (1973) and Joseph Balsamo (1973), and did the TV movies Vaincre à Olympie (1977) and Les Parents terribles (1980), based on the play by Cocteau.

He directed stage productions of Le bel indifférent (1975) and Les Parents terribles. He took the latter to London in 1978.

=== Later career ===
His later work included Emmenez-moi au théâtre; Parking (1985) directed by Demy; Lien de parenté (1986); Les enfants du naufrageur (1992); Dis Papa, raconte-moi là-bas (1993); Les Misérables (1995 film), directed by Claude Lelouch; and Stealing Beauty (1996), directed by Bernardo Bertolucci.

He performed on stage until his 80s, also working as a sculptor and painter. His sculpture Le passe muraille (The Walker Through Walls) can be seen in the Montmartre Quarter of Paris.

In 1985, he was the head of the jury at the 35th Berlin International Film Festival. He was featured in the 1995 documentary Screening at the Majestic, which is included on the 2003 DVD release of the restored print of Beauty and the Beast.

== Personal life ==
From 1937 to 1947 Marais was the lover of Jean Cocteau, who considered him his "'muse". They remained lifelong friends after their relationship ended. Following Cocteau's death in 1963, Marais renounced the inheritance in favor of Cocteau's last partner, Édouard Dermit. Late in life, he described Cocteau essentially as a friend and mentor. In 1992, Marais wrote a memoir of Cocteau, L'Inconcevable Jean Cocteau. He also wrote an autobiography, Histoires de ma vie, published in 1975. Throughout his life Marais made little effort to hide his sexual orientation but did not flaunt it either, and it never hindered his career and popularity in France.

While the majority of Marais' partners were men, he also had several relationships with women, the most significant one with actress Mila Parély. Marais' on-off relationship with Parély began while they co-starred in the film Le Lit à colonnes (1942) and continued during the making of Beauty and the Beast (1946). They later remained lifelong friends and were also business partners: in the 1970s, Parély became the manager of an art gallery and pottery shop where Marais sold his works in Paris. From 1948 until 1959, Marais' companion was the American dancer Georges Reich.

In 1942, Marais had a brief affair with a woman, Maria Ayala. This resulted in the birth of a son, Serge Ayala. Marais initially disbelieved that he was Serge's biological father; they met years later when Serge was a teenager and Marais eventually recognized his son in 1963. In his autobiography, Marais falsely claimed that Serge was his adopted son, which was later repeated in the media. Serge, who took the legal name Serge Villain-Marais, had a brief career as a singer and actor thanks to his father's support. In 1996, Marais, who felt neglected by his son, bequeathed his possessions to his close friend Nicole Pasquali. After Marais' death, Serge sued Pasquali and her husband and managed to recover part of his inheritance; he committed suicide in 2012 at age 69 following bouts of loneliness and depression.

=== Death ===
Marais died from cardiovascular disease in Cannes, Alpes-Maritimes in 1998. He is interred in the Village cemetery at Vallauris, near Antibes.

== Honors and awards ==
Commander of the Order of Legion of Honour (1996)

== In popular culture ==
The character Tragicomix, in the comic book Asterix the Legionary of 1967, has his characteristics based on Jean Marais.

The story of Marais' wartime beating of Alain Laubreaux became an inspiration for a scene in François Truffaut's 1980 film The Last Metro.

In 1983, a still shot of him from Jean Cocteau's 1950 film Orphée was featured on the cover of The Smiths' "This Charming Man."

== Filmography ==
Year	Title	Role	Director	Notes
1933	On the Streets		Victor Trivas	Uncredited
1933	L'Épervier		Marcel L'Herbier	
1933	Étienne		Jean Tarride	
1934	The Scandal	Liftboy	Marcel L'Herbier	
1934	Le Bonheur	Journalist	Marcel L'Herbier	Uncredited
1934	The Adventurer	Young worker	Marcel L'Herbier	Uncredited
1936	The New Men	Office clerk	Marcel L'Herbier	
1937	Nights of Fire		Marcel L'Herbier	Uncredited
1937	Bizarre, Bizarre	Drunk who gets mugged	Marcel Carné	Uncredited
1937	Abused Confidence	Marais	Henri Decoin	
1938	The Patriot		Maurice Tourneur	
1938	Remontons les Champs-Élysées	Abbot tutor	Sacha Guitry	
1941	The Pavilion Burns	Daniel	Jacques de Baroncelli	
1942	Le Lit à colonnes	Rémi Bonvent	Roland Tual	
1942	Carmen		Christian-Jaque	
1943	The Eternal Return	Patrice	Jean Delannoy	
1943	Voyage Without Hope	Alain Ginestier	Christian-Jaque	
1944	Carmen	Don José	Christian-Jaque	
1946	Beauty and the Beast	Beast/Ardent/Avenant	Jean Cocteau	
1947	The Royalists	The Marquis de Montauran	Henri Calef	
1948	Ruy Blas	Ruy Blas	Pierre Billon	
1948	The Eagle with Two Heads	Stanislas	Jean Cocteau	
1948	To the Eyes of Memory	Jacques Forester	Jean Delannoy	
1948	Les Parents terribles	Michel	Jean Cocteau	
1949	The Secret of Mayerling	Archduke Rodolphe	Jean Delannoy	
1950	Orpheus	Orphée	Jean Cocteau	
1950	The Glass Castle	Rémy Marsay	René Clément	
1950	Coriolan		Jean Cocteau	
1951	Miracles Only Happen Once	Jérôme	Yves Allégret	
1952	Leathernose	Roger de Tainchebraye	Yves Allégret	
1952	Love, Madame	Himself	Gilles Grangier	cameo appearance, Uncredited
1953	The Call of Destiny	Lorenzo Lombardi	Georges Lacombe	
1953	The Lovers of Midnight	Marcel Dulac	Roger Richebé	
1953	Voice of Silence	the former maquis	Georg Wilhelm Pabst	
1953	Dortoir des grandes	Désiré Marco	Henri Decoin	
1953	Julietta	André Landrecourt	Marc Allégret	
1953	Boum sur Paris	Himself	Maurice de Canonge	
1953	Le Guérisseur	Pierre Lachaux-Laurent	Yves Ciampi	
1954	The Count of Monte Cristo	Edmond Dantès / Count of Monte Cristo	Robert Vernay	
1954	Royal Affairs in Versailles	Louis XV	Sacha Guitry	
1955	Napoléon	General Montholon	Sacha Guitry	
1955	Futures vedettes	Éric Walter	Marc Allégret	
1956	If Paris Were Told to Us	Francis I of France	Sacha Guitry	
1956	Goubbiah, mon amour	Goubbiah	Robert Darène	
1956	The Whole Town Accuses	François Nérac	Claude Boissol	
1956	Elena and Her Men	Général François Rollan	Jean Renoir	
1957	Typhoon Over Nagasaki	Pierre Marsac	Yves Ciampi	
1957	S.O.S. Noronha	Frédéric Coulibaud	Georges Rouquier	
1957	White Nights	the tenant	Luchino Visconti	
1957	Amour de poche	Jérôme Nordman	Pierre Kast	
1958	La Tour, prends garde !	Henri La Tour	Georges Lampin	
1958	Every Day Has Its Secret	Xavier Lezcano	Claude Boissol	
1958	Life Together	Teddy Brooks	Clément Duhour	
1959	Le Bossu	Henri de Lagardère	André Hunebelle	
1960	Le Testament d'Orphée	Oedipe	Jean Cocteau	Uncredited
1960	Austerlitz	Lazare Carnot	Abel Gance	
1960	Captain Blood	François de Capestan	André Hunebelle	
1961	La Princesse de Clèves	Prince of Clèves	Jean Delannoy	
1961	Captain Fracasse	Capitaine Fracasse	Pierre Gaspard-Huit	
1961	Le Miracle des loups	Robert de Neuville	André Hunebelle	
1961	Napoleon II, the Eaglet	General Montholon	Claude Boissol	
1961	L'Enlèvement des Sabines	Mars	Richard Pottier	Cameo
1962	Ponce Pilate	Pontius Pilate	Gian Paolo Callegari	
1962	The Mysteries of Paris	Rodolphe de Sambreuil	André Hunebelle	
1962	Le Masque de fer	d'Artagnan	Henri Decoin	
1963	The Reluctant Spy	Stanislas Evariste Dubois	Jean-Charles Dudrumet	
1964	Cherchez l'idole	Himself	Michel Boisrond	Cameo
1964	Patate	Noël Carradine	Robert Thomas	
1964	Fantômas	Fantômas / Fandor	André Hunebelle	
1965	The Man from Cocody	Jean-Luc Hervé de la Tommeraye	Christian-Jaque	
1965	Thomas the Impostor	Narrator	Georges Franju	Voice
1965	Pleins feux sur Stanislas	Stanislas Evariste Dubois	Jean-Charles Dudrumet	
1965	Operation Double Cross	Antoine Donadieu	Gilles Grangier	
1965	Fantômas se déchaîne	Fantômas / Fandor	André Hunebelle	
1966	The Saint Lies in Wait	Simon Templar	Christian-Jaque	
1967	Sept hommes et une garce	Dorgeval	Bernard Borderie	
1967	Fantômas contre Scotland Yard	Fantômas / Fandor	André Hunebelle	
1969	Le Paria	Manu	Claude Carliez	
1970	La Provocation	Christian	André Charpak	
1970	Le Jouet criminel	The nameless protagonist	Adolfo Arrieta	
1970	Donkey Skin	The first King	Jacques Demy	
1973	Joseph Balsamo	Alessandro Cagliostro	André Hunebelle	7 episodes
1976	Chantons sous l'Occupation	Himself	André Halimi	
1977	Vaincre à Olympie	Menesthée	Michel Subiela	TV movie
1980	Les Parents terribles	Georges	Yves-André Hubert	TV movie
1982	Emmenez-moi au théâtre	George Bernard Shaw	Alexandre Tarta	Episode: "Cher menteur"
1985	Parking	Hades	Jacques Demy	
1986	Lien de parenté	Victor Blaise	Willy Rameau	
1992	Les Enfants du naufrageur	Marc-Antoine	Jérôme Foulon	
1993	Dis Papa, raconte-moi là-bas		Guy Gilles	
1995	Les Misérables	Bishop Myriel	Claude Lelouch	Cameo
1996	Stealing Beauty	Monsieur Guillaume	Bernardo Bertolucci	
1997	Milice, film noir	Himself	Alain Ferrari	Documentary
1999	Luchino Visconti	Himself	Carlo Lizzani	Documentary

== See also ==
- Place Jean-Marais
