= Le Guérisseur =

1953 film by Yves Ciampi

- Directed by: Yves Ciampi
- Written by: Yves Ciampi; Jacques-Laurent Bost
- Produced by: Les Films du Cyclope
- Starring: Dieter Borsche; Jean Marais
- Release date: 6 December 1953 (France)
- Running time: 95 minutes
- Country: France
- Language: French
- Box office: 1,716,955 admissions (France)

Le Guérisseur (English: The Faith healer) is a French drama film from 1953, directed by Yves Ciampi and written by Jacques-Laurent Bost, starring Dieter Borsche and Jean Marais. The film was released in other countries under the titles Der Arzt und das Mädchen (Austria/Germany), De wonderdokter (Belgium), and Flickan och polisen (Sweden).

== Cast ==
- Jean Marais : Pierre Lachaux dit Laurent Le Guérisseur
- Danièle Delorme : Isabelle Dancey, modiste de Paris
- Maurice Ronet : André Turenne
- Dieter Borsche : Dr. Jean Scheffer (de la Faculté en Bretagne)
- Jean Murat : Professeur Chataignier
- Jean Galland : Michel Boëldieu
- Pierre Mondy : Robert, assistant de Laurent
- Marianne Oswald : The healer Lucie
- Jim Gérald : Virolet, le rebouteux
- Colette Régis : Louise Mériadec, la tante d'Isabelle
- Renée Passeur : La comtesse
