= Jean-François Poron =

French actor (1936–2020)

- Born: 6 May 1936; Paris, France
- Died: 3 September 2020 (aged 84); Southern France
- Occupation: Actor

Jean-François Poron (6 May 1936 – 3 September 2020) was a French actor and director.

== Biography ==
Poron began training as an actor at Cours Simon in Paris. On 12 August 1968, he lost control of his Porsche on Route nationale 20 near Angerville. He was hospitalized in Étampes with a triple fracture in his right leg.

Jean-François Poron died in Southern France on 3 September 2020 at the age of 84.

== Filmography ==
=== Cinema ===
- The Air of Paris (1954)
- Pardonnez nos offenses (1956)
- Young Sinners (1958)
- Le Miroir à deux faces (1958)
- Les Jeux dangereux (1958)
- Asphalte (1959)
- Les Loups dans la bergerie (1960)
- La Princesse de Clèves (1961)
- Rendezvous (1961)
- Le Masque de fer (1962)
- Taras Boulba, il cosacco (1963)
- Le Fils de Tarass Boulba (1964)
- Jerk à Istanbul (1967)
- Raphael or The Debauched One (1971)
- Quand la ville s'éveille (1975)
- Les Filles du régiment (1978)
- Charlie Bravo (1980)
- A Captain's Honor (1982)
- The Inquiry (1986)
- What the Day Owes the Night (2012)

=== Television ===
- En votre âme et conscience (1959)
- La caméra expore le temps (1959)
- Les Cinq Dernières Minutes (1960)
- Les Concini (1961)
- Twelfth Night (1962)
- Ruy Blas (1965)
- Destins (1965)
- Mer libre (1965)
- Retour à Bacoli (1966)
- Marion Delorme (1967)
- Le Théâtre de la jeunesse (1968)
- La Duchesse de Berry (1971)
- Les Cinq Dernières Minutes (1971)
- Les Fossés de Vincenne (1972)
- Figaro-ci, Figaro-là (1972)
- La Fin et les moyens (1972)
- Un tyran sous la pluie (1973)
- Byron libératuer de la Grèce ou le Jardin des héros (1973)
- Une vieille maîtresse (1975)
- Les Cinq Dernières Minutes (1975)
- Le Renard à l'anneau d'or (1975)
- Salvator et Les Mohicans de Paris (1975)
- Le Siècle des lumières (1976)
- The Gallant Lords of Bois-Doré (1976)
- Les Cinq Dernières Minutes (1977)
- Gaston Phébus (1978)
- La Maréchale d'Ancre (1979)
- Les Amours des années folles (1980)
- Le Comte de Monte-Cristo (1980)
- Quatre femmes, quatre vies : Des chadails pour l'hiver (1981)
- Rioda (1981)
- Les Amours des années grises (1982)
- Marianne, une étoile Napoléon (1983)
- Au théâtre ce soir (1984)
- Christopher Columbus (1985)
- Grand Hôtel (1986)
- Catherine (1986)
- Coupable ou non coupable (1987)
- Le Gerfaut (1987)
- Le Chevalier de Pardaillan (1988)
- Anges et Loups (1988)
- Tendresse et Passion (1989)
- Un citoyen sans importance (1989)
- V comme vengeance (1992)
- Saint-Exupéry : La Dernière Mission (1996)
- Tresko-Amigo Affäre (1996)
- Van Loc : un grand flic de Marseille (1997)
- Une femme d'honneur (1997)
- Maigret (2004)
- Navarro (2004)
