= Operation Double Cross =

- Directed by: Gilles Grangier
- Written by: René Cambon (novel); Gilles Grangier (screenplay); Jacques Robert (screenplay and dialogue)
- Starring: Jean Marais; Marisa Mell; Howard Vernon; Gérard Tichy
- Music by: André Hossein
- Release date: 10 November 1965
- Running time: 92 minutes
- Language: Italian
- Box office: 1,346,179 admissions (France)

Operation Double Cross (French: Train d'enfer, Spanish: Trampa bajo el sol, Italian: Danger - Dimensione morte) is a 1965 Eurospy film starring Jean Marais. A French-Spanish-Italian international co-production, it is based on a novel by René Cambon, and was directed by Gilles Grangier.

== Plot ==
In Barcelona, secret agent Antoine Donadieu thwarts the plans of a Nazi scientist.

== Cast ==
- Jean Marais as Antoine Donadieu
- Marisa Mell as Frieda
- Gérard Tichy as Matras
- Howard Vernon as the Professor
- Carlos Casaravilla as Barowsky
- Jean Lara as Berthier
- Antonio Casas as the Colonel
- Fernando Guillén as Fayol
- Alvaro de Luna as Hamlet
- José Manuel Martín as Jaime
- Rico Lopez as Chico
- Gamil Ratib as Émir Ali Salim
- José María Caffarel as the Police Technical Expert
- Víctor Israel as the Gunsmith
- Léon Zitrone as himself

== Popular culture ==
In the 2002 film, The Bourne Identity, Marie, in Jason's Paris apartment, wears a Train D'enfer shirt.
