= Le Masque de fer =

- Directed by: Henri Decoin
- Written by: Cecil Saint-Laurent
- Starring: Jean Marais; Claudine Auger; Jean-Francois Poron; Gisèle Pascal
- Cinematography: Pierre Petit
- Edited by: Louisette Hautecoeur
- Music by: Georges Van Parys
- Distributed by: Gaumont Distribution
- Release dates: 26 October 1962 (France); 8 March 1963 (Italy)
- Running time: 127 min.
- Countries: France; Italy
- Box office: 2,431,259 admissions (France)

Le Masque de fer ("The Iron Mask") is a 1962 French film directed by Henri Decoin, based very loosely on the 1850 novel The Vicomte of Bragelonne: Ten Years Later by Alexandre Dumas and specifically part 3 of the novel, The Man in the Iron Mask; which in turn is based on the real-life story of the Man in the Iron Mask.

== Synopsis ==
Cardinal Mazarin gives d'Artagnan the mission to rescue the imprisoned twin brother of King Louis XIV.

In a scene not in the original book, d'Artagnan grabs Isabelle de Saint-Mars, pulls up her dress, and spanks her to punish her for not keeping a promise she had made.

== Technical details ==
- Director: Henri Decoin
- Writer: Laurent Devries, Gérald Devriès, Cécil Saint-Laurent after the works of Alexandre Dumas
- Producer: Roger de Broin
- Director of photography: Pierre Petit
- Music: Georges Van Parys
- Editing: Louisette Hautecoeur
- Scenery: Olivier Girard and Paul-Louis Boutié
- Genre: Adventure
- Length: 127 min
- Date of release: France, 1962

== Starring ==
- Jean Marais: d'Artagnan
- Jean-François Poron: Henri/Louis XIV
- Sylva Koscina: Marion
- Gisèle Pascal: Mme de Chaulmes
- Jean Rochefort: Lastréaumont
- Claudine Auger: Isabelle de Saint-Mars
- Germaine Montero: Anne d'Autriche
- Simone Derly: Marie Mancini
- Noël Roquevert: M de Saint-Mars
- Jean Lara: Renaud de Lourmes
- Jean Davy: Maréchal de Turenne
- Raymond Gérôme: Pimentel
- Philippe Lemaire: Vaudreuil
- Enrico Maria Salerno: Cardinal Mazarin
- Clément Thierry: Maulévrier
- Max Montavon: le notaire
