= The Glass Castle (1950 film) =

- Directed by: René Clément
- Written by: René Clément; Gian Bistolfi; Pierre Bost
- Produced by: Henry Deutschmeister; Eugène Tucherer
- Starring: Michèle Morgan; Jean Marais
- Cinematography: Robert Lefebvre
- Edited by: Roger Dwyre
- Music by: Yves Baudrier
- Production companies: Franco London Films; Fortezza-Film; Universalia Film
- Distributed by: Les Films Corona
- Release date: 16 December 1950
- Running time: 99 minutes
- Countries: France; Italy
- Languages: French; Italian
- Box office: 1,6674,474 admissions (France)

The Glass Castle (French: Le Château de verre) is a 1950 French romantic drama film directed by René Clément who co-wrote the screenplay with Gian Bistolfi and Pierre Bost, based on the 1935 novel Das große Einmaleins by Vicki Baum. The film stars Michèle Morgan and Jean Marais, Jean Servais (French version), Fosco Giachetti (Italian version) and Elisa Cegani. It was shot at the Billancourt Studios in Paris and on location around the city. The film's sets were designed by the art director Léon Barsacq; the costume designer was Pierre Balmain.

== Main characters ==
- Michèle Morgan as Evelyne Lorin-Bertal
- Jean Marais as Rémy Marsay
- Jean Servais as Laurent Bertal (French version)
- Fosco Giachetti as Laurent Bertal (Italian version)
- Elisa Cegani as Eléna
- Elina Labourdette as Marion
- Giovanna Galletti as Louise Morel - l'accusée
- André Carnège as Le secrétaire
- Roger Dalphin as Marcel
- Albert Michel as Le charmeur d'oiseaux
- Colette Régis as La tenancière de l'hôtel
- Allain Dhurtal as Le procureur

== See also ==
- Rendezvous in Paris (1982 film)
