= Milice, film noir =

- Directed by: Alain Ferrari
- Written by: Alain Ferrari
- Produced by: Jean-Luc Denéchau
- Starring: Emile Augonnet; Francoise Basch
- Narrated by: Michel Bouquet
- Edited by: Didier Ranz
- Music by: Denis Barbier
- Release date: 10 December 1997 (France)
- Running time: 128 minutes (USA)
- Country: France
- Language: French

Milice, film noir (English: Militia, black film) is a French documentary film from 1997. It was directed and written by Alain Ferrari, starring Emile Augonnet, Francoise Basch, and Michel Bouquet.

== Synopsis ==
The documentary film about French militia, active under the Vichy regime in occupied France, during World War II. Interviews with former militia men and their victims. It demonstrates that the militia's ruthless persecution of Jews and resistance movements exceeded even the Gestapo's requirements.

== Cast ==
- Emile Augonnet: herself
- Francoise Basch: himself
- Michel Bouquet: narrator
- Jean Cantaloup: himself
- Philippe Darnand: himself
- Jacques Delperlle de Bayac: himself
- Alain Ferrari: himself
- Jean Marais: himself

== See also ==
- Chantons sous l'Occupation
