= Les Parents terribles =

Play written by Jean Cocteau

- Original language: French
- Written by: Jean Cocteau

Premiere
- Date: 1938

Les Parents terribles is a 1938 French play written by Jean Cocteau. Despite initial problems with censorship, it was revived on the French stage several times after its original production, and in 1948 a film adaptation directed by Cocteau was released. English-language versions have been produced under various titles including Intimate Relations and Indiscretions.

== History ==
In January 1938 Cocteau wanted to concentrate on writing a new play and left Paris to stay in Montargis, accompanied by Jean Marais. A concentrated period of work led to the completion of the text by the end of February. Its title was then La Roulotte ou la maison dans la lune ("The caravan or the house on the moon"), referring to the negligent way of life of certain characters, and the unrealistic attitude of others. Cocteau intended the five roles for specific actors: Yvonne de Bray, Madeleine Ozeray, Gabrielle Dorziat, Louis Jouvet and Jean Marais (and the first two of these lent their first names to the characters).

The play mingles elements of tragedy and farce. Cocteau said that he wanted to write in the manner of popular theatre ("une pièce de boulevard") – but also to make it a portrait of such theatre. He was seeking to engage with his audience while raising to the level of tragedy a theme that was almost out of "vaudeville".

Initially it was proposed that Jouvet should produce the play at his Théâtre de l'Athénée, but he then rejected the piece and withdrew from the project. It then took several months of searching for a theatre before Cocteau made an agreement with Roger Capgras and Alice Cocéa to present the play at the Théâtre des Ambassadeurs in Paris. Rehearsals were troubled and several changes of cast took place. Alice Cocéa took over the role of Madeleine and Marcel André took the part of Georges. Most significantly, Yvonne de Bray became ill and had to be replaced by Germaine Dermoz. (The published version of the play was still dedicated to Yvonne de Bray.)

The first performance took place on 14 November 1938. The initial reaction of the Parisian critics was predominantly enthusiastic. "A kind of triumph for the theatre, the author, and the actors" was one judgment. Only the right-wing press took a different view, deploring the play's apparently loose morality. Robert Brasillach wrote a particularly vehement attack on the play, referring to its putrefaction ("pourriture"), defilement ("profanation"), and filth ("ordure"): "the smell of dirty linen fills the whole play". Although numerous aspects of the play were cited to support these denunciations, it was the allegation that it portrayed an incestuous relationship between mother and son which caused the greatest controversy.

None of this deterred the public from attending in large numbers, but the play's initial run was brought to an abrupt halt when a proposal to hold a free performance for older children from local schools met with outraged objections. The theatre was controlled by the city authorities, and a decision to terminate the production was carried through amid fierce arguments. Within a few weeks however, the play was installed at another theatre, the Bouffes-Parisiens, where it ran for 300 performances.

== Synopsis ==
In a rambling apartment, a middle-aged couple, Yvonne and Georges, live with their 22-year-old son Michel and Yvonne's spinster sister Léonie ("tante Léo"), who has also been in love with Georges. Yvonne is a reclusive semi-invalid, dependent on her insulin treatment, and intensely possessive of her son (who returns her immoderate affection and calls her "Sophie"); Georges distractedly pursues his eccentric inventions; it is left to Léo to preserve such order as she can in their life and their apartment, which she describes as a "gypsy caravan" ("la roulotte"). When Michel announces that he is in love with a girl, Madeleine, whom he wishes to introduce to them, his parents are immediately hostile and seek to forbid the relationship, reducing Michel to despair. Georges realises that Madeleine is the same woman who has been his own mistress in recent months, and he confesses all to Léo, who devises a plan to extricate father and son by forcing Madeleine into the silent surrender of both of them.

The family visit Madeleine in her apartment where they are impressed by her modest and well-disciplined manner. Michel's initial joy at this apparent reconciliation turns to despair as Madeleine is blackmailed into rejecting him by Georges's secret threats. Yvonne consoles her son with satisfaction as they return home. Léo however is appalled by the cruelty and selfishness of what has been done and decides to support Madeleine.

The next day Léo persuades Georges, and then the more reluctant Yvonne, that the only way to rescue the inconsolable Michel is to allow him to marry Madeleine. Michel and Madeleine are joyfully reunited, but Yvonne is unnoticed as she slips away and takes an overdose of insulin. When the others realise what she has done, it is too late to save her. A new order is established in the "roulotte".

== Productions ==
The original production, by Roger Capgras and Alice Cocéa, was mounted at the Théâtre des Ambassadeurs in Paris between 14 November and 20 December 1938. After this run was terminated amid accusations of immorality, the production was transferred to the Théâtre des Bouffes-Parisiens in January 1939 where it continued until the outbreak of World War II.

In October 1941, during the German occupation of Paris, the play was revived at the Théâtre du Gymnase with its dedicatee Yvonne de Bray appearing in it for the first time. Serge Reggiani replaced Jean Marais in the role of Michel. Influential enemies of Cocteau mounted a campaign of opposition and at the first performances rats were released in the auditorium and tear-gas bombs were thrown on the stage. The play was banned by the city authorities. The ban was briefly lifted in December and the play resumed amid further disturbances before being swiftly cancelled again.

After the war Les Parents terribles was revived again at the Théâtre du Gymnase in February 1946, and this time found almost the ideal cast that Cocteau had envisaged. Yvonne de Bray, Gabrielle Dorziat, Marcel André and Jean Marais returned to their roles, and Josette Day took the part of Madeleine. It ran for over 500 performances, with later cast changes, and in 1949 the production formed part of a theatrical tour which Cocteau organised in the Middle East.

In 1977, Jean Marais directed a new Paris production at the Théâtre Antoine, in which he himself now played the role of Georges. The rest of the cast were Lila Kedrova (Yvonne), France Delahalle (Léo), Caroline Silhol (Madeleine), and François Duval (Michel). It had 260 performances in Paris, and subsequently was taken on international tour and was recorded for French television.

=== Principal English-language productions ===
An English version of Les Parents terribles, translated by Caroline Francke, was produced in May 1940 at the Gate Theatre in Dublin. The cast included Cyril Cusack, Vivienne Bennett, and Martita Hunt.

In 1951 a London production under the title Intimate Relations, in a translation by Charles Frank, was presented at the Strand Theatre, starring Fay Compton.

In 1994 the National Theatre in London produced the play, as Les Parents terribles, using a new translation by Jeremy Sams. The director was Sean Mathias, and the cast consisted of Sheila Gish (Yvonne), Frances de la Tour (Leo), Alan Howard (George), Lynsey Baxter (Madeleine), and Jude Law (Michael/Michel).

The same production, under the new title Indiscretions, was presented in New York in 1995 at the Barrymore Theater, again with Jude Law but with different actors in the other roles: Kathleen Turner (Yvonne), Eileen Atkins (Leo), Roger Rees, and Cynthia Nixon.

== Adaptations ==
Film and television adaptations of the play include:

- Les Parents terribles (1948), written and directed by Cocteau, featuring the cast from the 1946 Paris stage production
- Intimate Relations (1953), a British film version, directed by Charles Frank, shown at the 1953 Cannes Film Festival (when Cocteau coincidentally was president of the jury).
- Les Parents terribles (1980), a French TV film, directed by Yves-André Hubert
