= Divine (1975 film) =

- Directed by: Dominique Delouche
- Written by: Jean-Pierre Ferrière
- Produced by: Bernard Lorain
- Starring: Danielle Darrieux; Jean Le Poulain; Martine Couture
- Cinematography: Yves Lafaye
- Edited by: Catherine-Alice Deiller; Maryse Siclier
- Music by: Jean Claudric; Bernard Lelou
- Production companies: Les Films du Buisson; Office de Radiodiffusion Télévision Française
- Distributed by: Framo Diffusion
- Release date: 10 June 1975
- Running time: 86 minutes
- Country: France
- Language: French

Divine is a 1975 French musical comedy film directed by Dominique Delouche and starring Danielle Darrieux, Jean Le Poulain and Martine Couture. A young man becomes obsessed with a famous entertainer, to the annoyance of his fiancée.

== Cast ==
- Danielle Darrieux as Marion Renoir
- Jean Le Poulain as L'imprésario Bobovitch
- Martine Couture as Antonia
- Richard Fontana as Olivier Chalon
- Candy as Agnès
- Georgette Plana as Gigi
- Raymond Gérôme as Le garçon de café
- Dominique Leverd as L'acteur qui joue Ruy Blas
- Christine Boisson

== Bibliography ==
- Dayna Oscherwitz & MaryEllen Higgins. The A to Z of French Cinema. Scarecrow Press, 2009.
