= Chantons sous l'Occupation =

- Directed by: André Halimi
- Written by: André Halimi
- Produced by: Argos Films; INA; Les Films Armorial
- Starring: Pascal Mazzotti; Maître Naud; Fabienne Jamet; Jean Marais
- Narrated by: Pascal Mazzotti
- Cinematography: Jean Rouch
- Edited by: Henri Colpi
- Release date: 28 April 1976 (France)
- Running time: 90 minutes; 95 minutes (USA)
- Country: France
- Language: French

Chantons sous l'Occupation (English: Singing during the Occupation) is a French documentary film from 1976. It was directed and written by André Halimi, starring Pascal Mazzotti, Maître Naud, and Fabienne Jamet.

The film tells about artists and entertainers (from Jean Cocteau to Maurice Chevalier) under the Nazi occupation of France (1940–1944). It presents the entire spectrum, from resisters to fascist sympathizers.

== Cast ==
- Maître Naud: himself
- Veit Relin: herself
- Manouche: herself
- Maître Weil-Curiel: himself
- Maurice Bardèche: himself
- Michel Audiard: himself
- Maud de Belleroche: herself
- André Pousse: himself
- Dominique Aury: herself
- Jean Marais: himself
- Arno Breker: himself
- Edouard Nessler: himself
- Jean-Louis Bory: himself
- Marc Doelnitz: himself

== See also ==
- Milice, film noir
