= Vaincre à Olympie =

- Written by: Maurice Genevoix
- Directed by: Michel Subiela
- Starring: Jean Marais; Thierry Dufour
- Country of origin: France
- Original language: French

Original release
- Release: 3 November 1977

Vaincre à Olympie (English: Win to Olimpie) is a French TV film from 1977. It was directed by Michel Subiela written by Maurice Genevoix, starring Thierry Dufour and Jean Marais. The scenario was based on a novel of Maurice Genevoix.

== Cast ==
- Thierry Dufour : Sostratos
- Jean Marais : Menesthée
- Panos Mihalopoulos : Euthymos
- Myrto Parashi : Pasithéa
- Georges Marchal : Milon de Crotone
- Jean Topart : Hérodore
- Jean Martinelli : Eukheiros
- Marie Lebée : Cymothoé
- Alexandros Goldfis : Théagène
- Vassilis Tsimbidis : Iphidamas
