= Patate (film) =

- Directed by: Robert Thomas (director)
- Screenplay by: Marcel Achard (play); Robert Thomas (director)
- Produced by: André Hakim; Jacques Dorfmann; Robert Haggiag
- Starring: Pierre Dux; Jean Marais; Danielle Darrieux; Sylvie Vartan
- Cinematography: Robert Lefebvre
- Edited by: Henri Taverna
- Music by: Raymond Le Sénéchal; Directed by Jacques Météhen; Arrangements by Hubert Rostaing
- Production companies: Belstar Productions; Les Films du Siècle; Sicilia Cinematografica; Ultra Film
- Distributed by: 20th Century Fox
- Release dates: 21 October 1964 (France); 17 November 1965 (New York City)
- Running time: 95 minutes
- Countries: France; Italy
- Language: French
- Box office: Box-office France 1964: 39th rank with 1,392,078 admissions

Patate is a 1964 French film starring Pierre Dux, Jean Marais, Danielle Darrieux and Sylvie Vartan. It is based upon the eponymous play by Marcel Achard, adapted by Robert Thomas, who also directed.

It was released in English as Friend of the Family.

== Synopsis ==
Léon Rollo, known as "Patate", accompanied by his wife Edith and his daughter Alexa whom he adores, is an unlucky inventor. His best friend, who is called Noël, succeeds in everything he does and Patate is jealous of his exceptional luck.

== Filming locations ==
Only in Paris:

- Place des Victoires 1st and 2th arrondissement
- Hôtel Salomon de Rothschild 11, rue Berryer 8th arrondissement
- Place de Rio de Janeiro and 4, Avenue Ruysdaël (overlooking the Parc Monceau) 8th arrondissement
- Rue Balzac 8th arrondissement
- Le Chalet des îles in the Bois de Boulogne 16th arrondissement
- 18, rue de l'Abreuvoir (overlooking Place Dalida) 18th arrondissement

== Reception ==
It had admissions in France of 1,392,070 Box-office France 1964: 39th rank with 1,392,078 admissions

According to Fox records, the film needed to earn $1,800,000 in rentals to break even and made $855,000, meaning it made a loss.

== About the film ==
Robert Thomas is less a filmmaker than an author of successful plays including the famous Huit Femmes created in 1958, which became François Ozon's biggest success in 2002 at the cinema.

Thomas' film is inspired by the eponymous play by Marcel Achard - Patate written in 1956 and premiered in Paris in 1957 at the Théâtre Saint-Georges. It played 2775 times over seven years.

The enormous theatrical success of Marcel Achard's play, was attractive to film producers including the American 20th Century Fox. The cinematographic adaptation is not up to the play. Robert Thomas' film does not stand out in by elegance nor innovation. From the worst theater filmed. It's not bad for all that (the rhythm holds up) but clearly without panache.

In an interview, Marcel Achard speaking of Thomas's film, declared: "The only thing I can say is that the film has little to do with the play. Achard did not participate in the adaptation nor the production, and the only resemblance to the original, is the credit: by Marcel Achard". He continues: “If it were entitled “The envious”, for example, or “Two false friends, instead of” Patate”, it would leave me completely indifferent".

The distribution of the film was however excellent but that is not enough to save the film from shipwreck writes Carole Weisweiller. This film is worth especially for the performance of Pierre Dux, who created the role in the theater, masterful in his role of "Patate", a failed toy designer. It's clearly Dux's movie from start to finish. He is both amusing and tragic, relegating to the role of supporting artists, the two cinematographic icons: Jean Marais who does well in the role of the old handsome and Danièle Darrieux, dazzling with beauty having at least the opportunity to perform the song “« Le Diable au Cœur »”, to music by Jacques Météhen. There are also all the great supporting roles in the film: Anne Vernon, Noël Roquevert, Jane Marken, Hubert Deschamps, Henri Virlojeux and Jacques Jouanneau.

The discovery of the film is Sylvie Vartan. This is her 1st major role in cinema after a few minor appearances, and before the few others in her short film career. She is in full glory as a teenager, the time of 'copains': 1963 is the year of En Écoutant la Pluie, 1964 is the year of La Plus Belle pour Aller Danser; the focus of the film is on her, she is twenty years old, she has her mischievous side, it is the baby-boom youth, she exhibits her nonchalance to her circle of friends, she is Sylvie Vartan in a French farce, a pièce de boulevard.

Lanvin [FR] Danielle Darrieux and Anne Vernon are dressed by Lanvin
Sylvie Vartan is dressed by Réal
