= Abused Confidence =

1938 film

- Directed by: Henri Decoin
- Written by: Pierre Wolff (story & dialogue); Adaptation: Henri Decoin; Jean Boyer
- Produced by: Joseph Bercholz
- Cinematography: Léonce-Henri Burel
- Edited by: Marguerite Beaugé
- Music by: Georges Van Parys
- Production company: U.D.I.F.
- Distributed by: Columbia Pictures (USA)
- Release dates: 6 February 1938 (Paris); 30 November 1938 (USA); 5 January 1944 (re-release, France)
- Running time: 88 minutes
- Country: France
- Language: French

Abused Confidence (French: Abus de confiance) is a 1938 French drama film directed by Henri Decoin and starring Danielle Darrieux and Charles Vanel.

== Plot ==
A female law student pretends to be the daughter of a famous historian.

== Selected cast ==
- Danielle Darrieux as Lydia
- Charles Vanel as Jacques Ferney
- Valentine Tessier as Hélène Ferney
- Pierre Mingand as Pierre Montant
- Yvette Lebon as Alice
- Thérèse Dorny as the landlady
- Jean Worms as the tribunal's president
- Gilbert Gil as Paul
- René Bergeron as Dieulafoy
- Lucien Dayle as Le logeur
- Svetlana Pitoëff as Renée Leclerc
- Jean Marais as Marais
- Jean Joffre as Le directeur de la Voix Populaire
