= Lien de parenté =

- Written by: Didier Kaminka; Jean-Pierre Rumeau
- Directed by: Willy Rameau
- Starring: Jean Marais; Serge Ubrette
- Music by: Bruno Coulais
- Country of origin: France
- Original language: French

Production
- Producers: Ministère de la Culture de la Republique Française; Plaisance-Prestations
- Cinematography: Jimmy Glasberg
- Editor: Delphine Desfons
- Running time: 95

Original release
- Release: 19 March 1986

Lien de parenté (English: Family ties) is a French TV drama film from 1986. It was directed by Willy Rameau and written by Didier Kaminka, starring Jean Marais and Serge Ubrette. The script was based on Oliver Lang's novel "Next of Kin".

== Cast ==
- Jean Marais: Victor Blaise
- Serge Ubrette: Clément, dit Clem
- Anouk Ferjac: Patricia Guérin
- Roland Dubillard: Philippe Guérin
- Diane Niederman: Cécile
- Charles Millot: Werner
- Michel Amphoux: Benavidez, the bistrot keeper
- Bernard Farcy: Lucien Donat
