= Les Enfants du naufrageur =

- Directed by: Jérôme Foulon
- Written by: François Celier; Laurent Dussaux
- Produced by: K'Ien Productions; Expand Drama; Gaumont
- Starring: Jean Marais; Brigitte Fossey; Michel Robin
- Cinematography: Willy Lubtchansky
- Edited by: Elisabeth Guido
- Music by: François Staal
- Distributed by: Gaumont Distribution
- Release date: 19 February 1992 (France)
- Running time: 99 minutes
- Country: France
- Language: French
- Box office: $1.1 million

Les Enfants du naufrageur is a French adventure film from 1992. It was directed by Jérôme Foulon written by François Celier, starring Jean Marais and Brigitte Fossey. The film is also known as "Shipwrecked Children".

== Cast ==
- Brigitte Fossey: Helene
- Jacques Dufilho: Petit Louis
- Michel Robin: Paul
- Jean Marais: Marc-Antoine
- Pierre-Alexis Hollenbeck: Capitan
- Benjamin Brault: Pinocchio
- Maxime Boidron: Benoît
- Simon Poligne: Lamazou
- François Vigner: Pérec
- Elie Berder: Merliot
- Gary Ledoux: Bisson
- Amandine Dewasmes: Marion
- Bernard Freyd: The mayor
- Michel Dussarat: Toinou
- Jenny Clève: Martha
- Albert Delpy
- Yves Belluardo:a fisherman
