= Le Lit à colonnes =

- Directed by: Roland Tual
- Written by: Charles Spaak; Louise de Vilmorin
- Starring: Fernand Ledoux; Jean Marais
- Music by: Jean Françaix
- Release date: 9 July 1942
- Running time: 107 minutes
- Country: France
- Language: French

Le Lit à colonnes (English: The Four-poster) is a French drama film from 1942, directed by Roland Tual, written by Charles Spaak, starring Fernand Ledoux and Jean Marais. The scenario was based on a novel of Louise de Vilmorin. In Finland the film was distributed under the title "Ristikon sävel" (realisation 7 February 1947).

== Cast ==
- Fernand Ledoux: Porey-Cave
- Michèle Alfa: Aline
- Odette Joyeux: Marie-Dorée
- Jean Marais: Rémi Bonvent
- Jean Tissier: Jacquot
- Pierre Larquey: Ten-Fingers
- Mila Parély: Yada
- Georges Marchal: Olivier de Verrières
- Emmy Lynn: the Countess of Verrières
- Valentine Tessier: Madame Porey-Cave
- Jacqueline Champi: Marguerite de Verrières
- Huguette Donga: Elise
- Georges Cadix: Little Maurice
