= Every Day Has Its Secret =

1958 French thriller film

- French: Chaque jour a son secret
- Directed by: Claude Boissol
- Written by: Paul Andréota; Claude Boissol; Pierre Laroche
- Based on: A novel by Maria Luisa Linarès
- Produced by: Gray-Film; Socipex; Vascos Films
- Starring: Jean Marais; Danièle Delorme
- Cinematography: Roger Fellous
- Edited by: Louis Devaivre
- Music by: Eddie Barclay
- Production company: Sonofilm
- Distributed by: Gray-Film; Socipex
- Release date: June 11, 1958 (France)
- Running time: 90 minutes
- Country: France
- Language: French
- Box office: 592,024 admissions (France)

Every Day Has Its Secret (French: Chaque jour a son secret) is a 1958 French drama thriller film directed by Claude Boissol, written by Paul Andréota, Claude Boissol, and Pierre Laroche, and starring Jean Marais and Danièle Delorme. The screenplay was adapted from a popular mystery novel written by Spanish author Maria Luisa Linarès.

== Plot ==
The narrative centers on Xavier Lezcano, a brilliant and dedicated ethnologist whose professional life is thrown into chaos by the sudden and mysterious death of his first wife. Consumed by grief and unresolved questions surrounding her passing, Xavier attempts to move forward with his life and eventually marries a young woman named Hélène. The couple relocates to the sprawling, isolated Lezcano family estate, where Xavier lives with his formidable mother, Madame Lezcano, and their intensely loyal family governess, Fina. Rather than finding a peaceful sanctuary, Hélène quickly realizes that the mansion is enveloped in an oppressive atmosphere of paranoia and hidden family rivalries.

As Hélène attempts to adapt to her new domestic life, she uncovers a series of unsettling discrepancies concerning the official account of the first wife's death. Her probing questions disturb the household dynamics, drawing suspicion from an examining magistrate and local law enforcement officers who begin investigating the family's past activities. Xavier finds himself caught between protecting his familial lineage and confronting a dark truth that threatens his new marriage. The tension culminates when a local doctor and a government official inadvertently expose a web of blackmail and deceit operating within the estate, forcing Xavier and Hélène to confront the perpetrator before the family legacy is permanently ruined.

== Cast ==
The central cast features Jean Marais as the tormented ethnologist Xavier Lezcano and Danièle Delorme as his sister Olga Lezcano, who is deeply entangled in the domestic unrest. Françoise Fabian portrays Hélène Lezcano, the second wife whose curiosity drives the central mystery, while veteran actress Marcelle Praince plays the family matriarch, Madame Lezcano. The supporting roles are filled by Denise Gence as the strict governess Fina, Yves Brainville as the probing examining magistrate, and Robert Le Béal as the influential director of France-Europe. Additional minor performances include Germaine Delbat as a village gossip, Alain Nobis and Lucien Frégis as local gendarmes, Raphaël Patorni as the administrative chief Yves Rollin, and Raymond Loyer as Doctor Destouches.

== Production and reception ==
Principal photography took place in the early months of 1958 at the historic Billancourt Studios in Paris, which provided the necessary interior sets to replicate the claustrophobic design of the Lezcano manor. Director Claude Boissol utilized stylized film noir shadow techniques alongside cinematographer Roger Fellous to emphasize the psychological strain experienced by the characters. The musical score was composed by notable French record producer and composer Eddie Barclay, who crafted an atmospheric, suspenseful soundtrack to amplify the film's dramatic pacing.

Upon its theatrical release in France on 11 June 1958, the film received mixed assessments from contemporary French film critics. While reviewers praised Jean Marais for delivering a restrained, atypical dramatic performance away from his usual swashbuckler roles, some critics found the narrative adaptation of Linarès' novel to be overly melodramatic. Despite the critical reservation, the feature achieved moderate commercial success in the domestic market, ultimately securing 592,024 theatrical admissions across France during its initial box office run.
