= Le Jouet criminel =

- Directed by: Adolfo Arrieta
- Written by: Adolfo Arrieta
- Starring: Jean Marais; Michèle Moretti
- Cinematography: Adolfo Arrieta
- Edited by: Adolfo Arrieta
- Release date: 10 January 1969 (France)
- Running time: 37 minutes
- Countries: France, Spain
- Language: French

Le Jouet criminel (English: The criminal toy) is a French short crime film from 1969. It was directed and written by Adolfo Arrieta, starring Jean Marais and Michèle Moretti.

== Cast ==
- Jean Marais: the oldtimer
- Michèle Moretti: the running woman
- Xavier Grandès: the angel
- Florence Delay: the housewife
- Philippe Bruneau: the housewife's husband
