= Dortoir des grandes =

1953 film by Henri Decoin

- Directed by: Henri Decoin
- Written by: François Chalais; Henri Decoin; Stanislas-André Steeman (novel 18 Fantômes)
- Produced by: C.F.C – Les Films Henry Decoin – E.G.E Films (France)
- Starring: Jean Marais; Françoise Arnoul; Jeanne Moreau
- Cinematography: Robert Lefebvre
- Edited by: Denise Reiss
- Music by: Georges Van Parys
- Distributed by: La Société des Films Sirius
- Release date: 21 April 1953
- Running time: 98 minutes
- Country: France
- Language: French
- Box office: 2,538,013 admissions (France)

Dortoir des grandes English: Seniors' Dormitory, is a French crime drama film from 1953, directed by Henri Decoin, written by François Chalais, starring Jean Marais and Louis de Funès. The film is also known under the titles: "Girls' Dormitory" and "Inside a Girls' Dormitory" (United States).

== Plot ==
In a little town with a renowned college, a female student is found after she was hogtied and strangled to death. Inspector Marco is assigned to catch the murderer.

== Cast ==
- Jean Marais: Inspector Désiré Marco
- Françoise Arnoul: Aimée de La Capelle, a resident
- Denise Grey: Mrs Hazard-Habran, the college director
- Jeanne Moreau: Julie, the waitress at the restaurant "La jument verte"
- Noël Roquevert: Emile, the owner of "La jument verte"
- Line Noro: Mrs Brigitte Tournesac, the supervisor at the collège
- Katherine Kath: Mrs Claude Persal, a professor at the college
- Umberto Almazan: Mr Da Costa, a restaurant guest
- Nicole Besnard as Chantal
- Louis de Funès: Mr Triboudot, Mérémont's photographer
- Pierre Morin: the commissioner Broche
- Jean Sylvère: the stamp collector
- Dany Carrel: Bettina de Virmant, a resident
- Yves-Marie Maurin: the little boy at the restaurant
- Davia: Mrs Simone Sergent, a college professor
- Edouard Francomme: a restaurant guest
- Martine Alexis
- Marie-France
