= Charles Millot =

Croatian-French actor

- Born: Veljko Milojević; 23 December 1921; Novi Pavljani near Bjelovar, Kingdom of Serbs, Croats and Slovenes
- Died: 6 October 2003 (aged 81); Paris, France
- Occupation: Actor

Charles Millot (born Veljko Milojević; 23 December 1921 – 6 October 2003) was a Yugoslav-born French actor who made many film appearances over a 35-year period.

== Career ==
His notable film appearances include: The Train (1964), The Night of the Generals (1967), Waterloo (1970) as Marquis de Grouchy, French Connection II (1975), The Unbearable Lightness of Being (1988) and Eye of the Widow (1991).

== Death ==
He died aged 81 on 6 October 2003 in Paris, France.

== Filmography ==
=== Film ===
- OSS 117 Is Not Dead (1957) - Ralph
- Line of Sight (1960) - Le chef des gangsters
- Until Hell Is Frozen (1961) - Seidenwar
- Les Ennemis (1962) - Borghine
- Arsène Lupin Versus Arsène Lupin (1962) - Le "docteur"
- The Gentleman from Epsom (1962) - Le directeur de la boîte de nuit (uncredited)
- The Eye of the Monocle (1962) - Commissaire Matlov
- Une ravissante idiote (1964) - Fedor Alexandrovitch Balaniev
- Requiem pour un caïd (1964) - Mick
- The Train (1964) - Pesquet
- The Great Spy Chase (1964) - Hans Müller
- Passeport diplomatique agent K 8 (1965)
- The Sleeping Car Murders (1965) - Le médecin légiste (uncredited)
- Trans-Europ-Express (1966) - Franck
- Un monde nouveau (1966) - Hans
- The Poppy Is Also a Flower (1966) - Financier of Marko (uncredited)
- The Nun (1966) - Monsieur Simonin
- Le Solitaire passe à l'attaque (1966) - Vaecos
- Triple Cross (1966) - 2nd Polish Interrogator
- The Night of the Generals (1967) - Wionczek
- To Commit a Murder (1967) - Un joueur de poker (uncredited)
- Bang Bang (1967)
- Mayerling (1968) - Count Taafe
- Battle of Neretva (1969) - Djuka
- Waterloo (1970) - Grouchy
- Promise at Dawn (1970) - Film Director
- To Die of Love (1971) - Le faux juge
- The Pine Tree in the Mountain (1971) - Domobranski satnik
- La Nuit bulgare (1972) - Le chef de la délégation bulgare
- L'affaire Crazy Capo (1973) - Slavio
- The Marseille Contract (1974) - The Butler
- Playing with Fire (1975) - Un ravisseur
- French Connection II (1975) - Miletto
- Le Futur aux trousses (1975)
- Atentat u Sarajevu (1975) - Islednik
- Anno Domini 1573 (1975) - Juraj Draskovic
- Death of a Corrupt Man (1977) - (uncredited)
- Le Dernier Amant romantique (1978)
- Vas-y maman (1978) - Le réceptionniste de l'hôtel à Franckfort
- Little Girl in Blue Velvet (1978) - Tripot, a policeman
- The Adolescent (1979) - Adrien, le maire
- The Man to Destroy (1979) - Agent prvog reda
- Bloodline (1979) - Commissaire Bloche
- Tajna Nikole Tesle (1980) - Adams
- High Voltage (1981) - Rus
- The Falcon (1981) - Plemic na dvoru Jug Bogdana
- L'Ombre rouge (1981) - Le père de Magda
- Balles perdues (1983) - Mister Teufminn
- Great Transport (1983) - Partizan koji pije vodu
- Angel's Bite (1984) - Uncle
- The Red and the Black (1985) - Upravnik
- Lien de parenté (1986) – Werner
- The Cry of the Owl (1987) - Le directeur
- The Unbearable Lightness of Being (1988)
- Una botta di vita (1988)
- Donator (1989) - Batler François Yvette
- Eye of the Widow (1991) - Carlos
- Priez pour nous (1994) - L'homme russe (final film role)

=== Television ===
Charles Millot television credits
Year	Title	Role	Notes	Ref.
1984	Master of the Game	Herr Bueller	TV miniseries	
1986	Sins	Russian	TV miniseries	
1987	Napoleon and Josephine: A Love Story	Pope	TV miniseries. Part III	
1988	The Mysterious Death of Nina Chereau	Mathias	TV movie. French: La mort mystérieuse de Nina Chéreau	
1988	The Great Escape II: The Untold Story	Bartender / BRNO	TV movie	
1989	The Saint: The Blue Dulac	Guy Pirenne	TV movie	
1992	Counterstrike	Dumont	Episode: "La Belle Dame Monique"	
