= Henri Decoin =

French film director

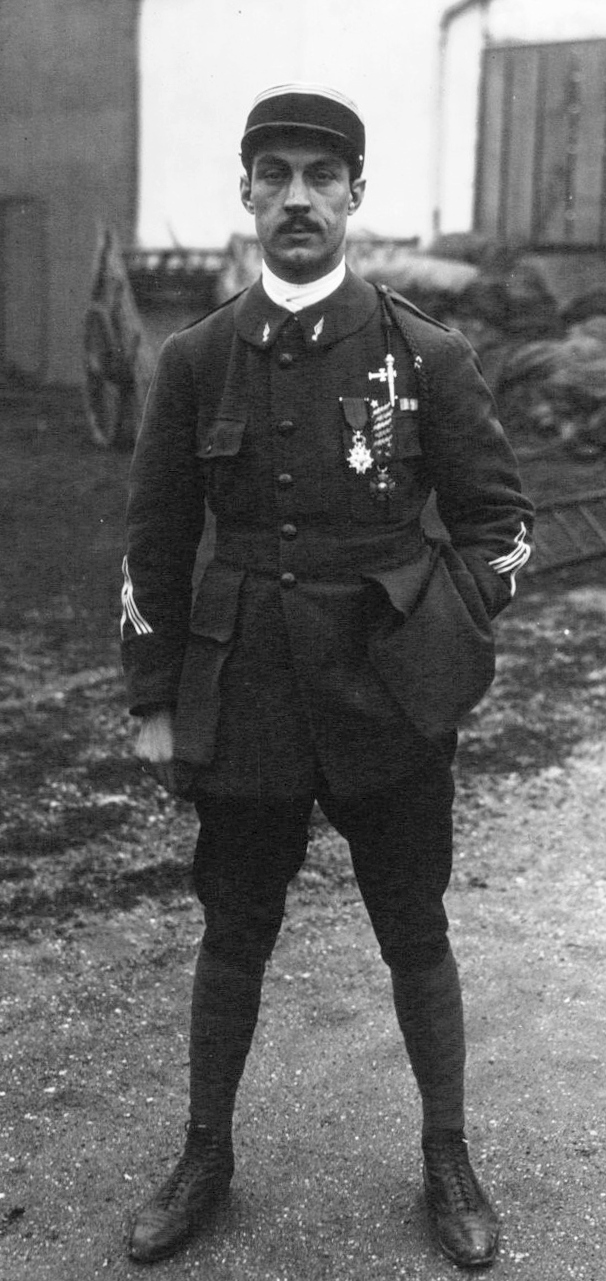
- Henri Decoin in 1919
- Born: 18 March 1890; Paris, France
- Died: 4 July 1969 (aged 79); Paris, France
- Occupations: Film director Screenwriter
- Years active: 1925–1964
- Spouse(s): 4, including: Blanche Montel (m. 1927; div. 1934) Danielle Darrieux (m. 1935; div. 1941)
- Children: 2, including Didier Decoin

Henri Decoin (18 March 1890 – 4 July 1969) was a French film director and screenwriter, who directed more than 50 films between 1933 and 1964. He was also a swimmer who won the national title in 1911 and held the national record in the 500 m freestyle. He competed in the 400 m freestyle at the 1908 Summer Olympics and in the water polo tournament at the 1912 Summer Olympics.

== Biography ==
During World War I, Decoin served as a pilot. After that he worked as a sports journalist for L'Auto, L'Intransigeant and Paris-Soir. In 1926 he published his first book, influenced by Dadaism, the experimental and prize-winning Quinze Combats (Fifteen Rounds), in which a boxing match is seen subjectively by a boxer, and in 1933 directed his first film, Les requins du pétrole (The Oil Sharks).

He was known for tackling many genres; with adaptations of Georges Simenon as The Strangers in the House (1942) - featuring Raimu in one of his famous roles, and The Truth Of Our Marriage (1952), historical films like The Case Of Poisons (1955), and The Iron Mask (1962), espionage flicks like The Cat (1958), police procedurals with Raid on the Drug Ring (1955) and Fire To The Powder (1957), psychological dramas in Green Domino (1935) (where he first met his second wife, Danielle Darrieux), and The Lovers Are Alone In The World (1948) and even an odd film noir like Between Eleven And Midnight (1949). He worked with such stars of French cinema as Jean Marais, Louis Jouvet, Juliette Gréco, Lino Ventura, Corinne Calvet, Anouk Aimée, Jeanne Moreau and Jean Gabin; to name a few.

He directed Darrieux in several films, and accompanied her to Hollywood in 1938 while she signed a Universal Pictures contract. He took the opportunity to observe how Hollywood made films, and returned to France with these techniques in hand. Decoin was one of the more prolific directors of his time.

== Personal life ==
Decoin was married four times. His second marriage was to actress and singer Danielle Darrieux. He had two sons, Jacques Decoin (1928–1998) and Didier Decoin (b. 1945), who is also a prominent screenwriter.

== Selected filmography ==
- His Highness Love (1931)
- The Unknown Singer (1931)
- Sailor's Song (1932)
- The Oil Sharks (1933)
- Gold in the Street (1934)
- Toboggan (1934)
- King of the Camargue (1935)
- The Green Domino (1935)
- Port Arthur (1936)
- Return at Dawn (1938)
- Abused Confidence (1938)
- Beating Heart (1940)
- Her First Affair (1941)
- Annette and the Blonde Woman (1942)
- Love Marriage (1942)
- Strangers in the House (1942)
- The Benefactor (1942)
- I Am with You (1943)
- The Devil's Daughter (1946)
- Not Guilty (1947)
- The Lovers of Pont Saint Jean (1947)
- Clockface Café (1947)
- Between Eleven and Midnight (1949)
- At the Grand Balcony (1949)
- Clara de Montargis (1951)
- Love and Desire (1951)
- Nightclub (1951)
- La Vérité sur Bébé Donge (1952)
- Dortoir des grandes (1953)
- Lovers of Toledo (1953)
- One Step to Eternity (1954)
- Les Intrigantes (1954)
- Razzia sur la chnouf (1955)
- The Affair of the Poisons (1955)
- Folies-Bergère (1957)
- Charming Boys (1957)
- Burning Fuse (1957)
- Anyone Can Kill Me (1957)
- The Cat (1958)
- Pourquoi viens-tu si tard? (1959)
- Nathalie, Secret Agent (1959)
- The Cat Shows Her Claws (1960)
- Where the Truth Lies (1962)
- Le Masque de fer (1962)
- Casablanca, Nest of Spies (1963)
- Les Parias de la gloire (1964)
- Nick Carter va tout casser (1964)
