= Yves-André Hubert =

French actor, television film director and theatre metteur en scène

Yves-André Hubert (French: [ivɑ̃dʁe ybɛʁ]; Paris, 7 August 1927 - Le Pecq, 14 June 2021) is a French television film director, theatre metteur en scèneand actor. He received a Sept d'or award in 1988 for L'Affaire Marie Besnard.

== Filmography ==
- 1961 : Youm et les longues moustaches
- 1962 : Les Bostoniennes, telefilm with Alice Sapritch and Robert Etcheverry
- 1963 : Le Chemin de Damas, telefilm based on the play by Marcel Haedrich
- 1964 : La Confrontation
- 1964 : La Cousine Bette, after the work by Honoré de Balzac. With Alice Sapritch (Élisabeth Fischer), Jean Sobieski, (Count Wenceslas Steinbock).
- 1967 : La Vie parisienne (television version of 1958 stage production by Jean-Louis Barrault).
- 1968 : Les Mésaventures de Jean-Paul Choppart (#Senlis/Noel)
- 1968 : Souffler n’est pas jouer
- 1966 : La clé des Cœurs (Beaugency)
- 1966 : La bête du Gévaudan (Gévaudan)
- 1969 : Si seulement tu voulais regarder par la fenêtre (Issy-les-Moulineaux)
- 1972 : François Malgorn, séminariste or celui qui n'était pas appelé (Bretagne)
- 1973 : Hans (Queyras)
- 1974 : Plaies et bosses (Ireland)
- 1974 : Agathe ou l’Avenir rêvé
- 1975 : Un bail pour l’éternité (Sardinia)
- 1976 : Le Lauzun de la Grande Mademoiselle (Châteaux Loire +)
- 1978 : Douze jours pour entrer dans l’Histoire (De Gaulle in June 1940) (Paris/London)
- 1980 : La Fortune des Rougon (Émile Zola novel)
- (1980) Les Parents terribles
- 1982 : Malesherbes, avocat du Roi (Loire)
- 1983 : Yalta (Yugoslavia)
- 1983 : Le Général a disparu (De Gaulle in May 1968/Baden-Baden/Colombey)
- 1984 : Emmenez-moi au théâtre: Chéri
- 1986 : L'Affaire Marie Besnard with Alice Sapritch and Bernard Fresson (3 "7 d’or")(Loudun/Meaux)
- 1986 : Le cri de la chouette (H.Bazin) (Lyon)
- 1988 : Le Temps mort (Toulouse)
- 1989 : Catherine de Médicis (selection "7 d’or") (Chambord/Vincennes)

== Theatre ==
- 1996 : Potins d'enfer by Jean-Noël Fenwick, Théâtre Rive Gauche.
