= Les Films Ariane =

French film company

Les Films Ariane was a French film company, founded by Alexandre Mnouchkine and named after his daughter Ariane Mnouchkine. In 2000, the company ceased operations, and all of its films were acquired by TF1 International, the film division of French broadcaster TF1.

== Selected filmography ==
- 1946 : Tant que je vivrai
- 1946 : Le destin s'amuse
- 1947 : Non coupable
- 1948 : Les Condamnés
- 1948 : L'Aigle à deux têtes
- 1948 : Les Parents terribles
- 1949 : Bal Cupidon
- 1950 : Julie de Carneilhan
- 1950 : Mon ami Sainfoin
- 1950 : L'Amant de paille
- 1950 : L'Homme de joie
- 1951 : Le Cap de l'espérance
- 1952 : Fanfan la Tulipe
- 1953 : Le Retour de don Camillo
