= Intimate Relations (1953 film) =

1953 film

- Pressbook cover
- Directed by: Charles Frank
- Written by: Charles Frank (screenplay)
- Based on: the play Les Parents terribles by Jean Cocteau
- Produced by: David Dent
- Starring: Harold Warrender
- Cinematography: Wilkie Cooper
- Edited by: Peter Bezencenet
- Music by: René Cloërec
- Production company: David Dent Productions (as Advance)
- Distributed by: Adelphi Films
- Release date: March 1953
- Running time: 86 minutes
- Country: United Kingdom
- Language: English

Intimate Relations (U.S. title Disobedient) is a 1953 British drama film directed by Charles Frank and starring Harold Warrender and Marian Spencer. It was written by Frank based on the 1938 play Les Parents terribles by Jean Cocteau. It was entered into the 1953 Cannes Film Festival.

== Plot ==
Crisis in a middle-class family when the son falls in love with his father's mistress. Family ties are stretched to breaking point, and the mother fears she'll lose her son as well as her husband.

== Cast ==
- Harold Warrender as George
- Marian Spencer as Yvonne
- Ruth Dunning as Leonie
- William Russell as Michael (as Enoch Russell)
- Elsie Albiin as Madeline (as Elsy Albin)

== Critical reception ==
The Monthly Film Bulletin wrote: "The original is one of the post-war French cinema's masterpieces, a superbly executed and dazzlingly acted example of cinematographic theatre. The English version can only be described as a freak. The adaptation of the play is close, the translation reasonably competent, and the shooting of the film itself is fairly closely modelled on Cocteau's own decoupage; where it fails is in the adaptation of something extremely Parisian in temperament in terms of provincial English repertory playing and approach."

Kine Weekly wrote: "The English players and director are unable to grasp the subtleties of the original and, as a result, its more questionable aspects are denied a coating of wit. Unpleasant and unamusing, its only hope is the specialised hall."

Variety wrote: "The adaptation by Charles Frank, who also wrote the screenplay and directed, tackles this sordid theme with a frank realism. He has, at times, tended to place too much reliance on dialog using stage methods rather than screen technique for his effects. Warrender plays the father with commendable sincerity and succeeds in achieving a measure of sympathy for his part in a distasteful situation. Marian Spencer reveals a tendency to overdo the hysteria demanded by the mother, but in her subdued moments is far more effective."

The New York Times's review concluded "the film's highlight, one superbly conceived and well-performed scene with the father and girl at loggerheads over the boy. As we contend, the author does know better. He has perceptively hammerlocked youth and age, and until the half-way mark, the above-mentioned encounter, the quandary is genuinely intriguing. But M. Cocteau's triumphant rattling of the Oedipus legend tilts the apple cart, and some of his own dialogue provides the best summary. "What a nightmare!" moans Miss Spencer at one point. Mr. Warrender: "You're telling me."

TV Guide wrote "the film is too talky and constricted by stage motifs. Enoch and Albiin, the mistress, do have a nice chemistry, though."
