= La Princesse de Clèves (film) =

- Directed by: Jean Delannoy
- Written by: Jean Cocteau
- Produced by: Robert Dorfmann; Robert Gascuel
- Starring: Marina Vlady; Jean Marais
- Cinematography: Henri Alekan
- Edited by: Henri Taverna
- Music by: Georges Auric
- Distributed by: Cinédis
- Release date: 22 March 1961
- Running time: 101 minutes
- Countries: France; Italy
- Language: French
- Box office: 3,424,907 admissions (France)

La Princesse de Clèves (Italian: La principessa di Cleves) is a 1961 French-Italian drama film based on the 1678 novel of the same name.

== Cast ==
- Marina Vlady – La princesse de Clèves
- Jean Marais – Le prince de Clèves
- Jean-François Poron – Jacques, Duke of Nemours
- Henri Piégay – Le vidame de Chartres
- Annie Ducaux – Diane de Poitiers
- Lea Padovani – Catherine de' Medici
