= Les Parents terribles (1980 film) =

- Based on: Les Parents terribles by Jean Cocteau
- Directed by: Yves-André Hubert
- Starring: Jean Marais; France Delahalle; Lila Kedrova
- Country of origin: France
- Original language: French

Original release
- Release: 11 October 1980

Les Parents terribles (English: The terrible Parents) is a French TV film from 1980. It was directed by Yves-André Hubert, starring Jean Marais, France Delahalle, and Lila Kedrova. It is based on the play with the same title by Jean Cocteau.

== Cast ==
- Jean Marais: Georges
- France Delahalle: Leo
- Lila Kedrova: Yvonne
- François Duval: Michel
- Anne Ludovik: Madeleine
