= Danielle Darrieux =

French actress and singer (1917–2017)

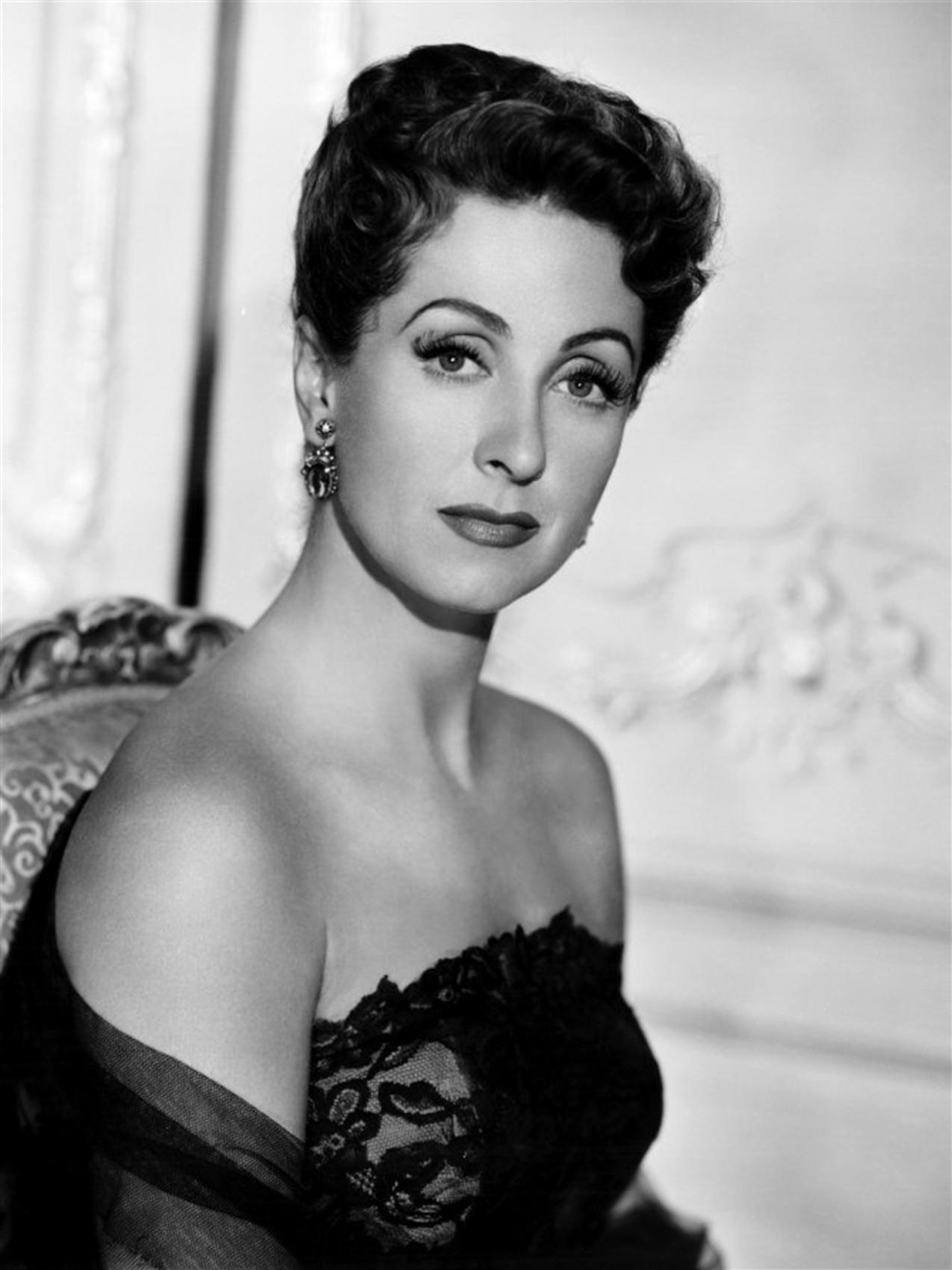
- Darrieux in a publicity photo for 5 Fingers (1952)
- Born: Danielle Yvonne Marie Antoinette Darrieux; 1 May 1917; Bordeaux, Gironde, France
- Died: 17 October 2017 (aged 100); Bois-le-Roi, Eure, France
- Occupation: Actress
- Years active: 1931–2010
- Spouses: Henri Decoin (m. 1935; div. 1941) Porfirio Rubirosa (m. 1942; div. 1947) Georges Mitsikidès (m. 1948; died 1991)
- Children: 1 (adopted)

Danielle Yvonne Marie Antoinette Darrieux (French pronunciation: [da.njɛl i.vɔn ma.ʁi ɑ̃.twa.nɛt daʁ.jø]; 1 May 1917 – 17 October 2017) was a French actress of stage, television and film, as well as a singer and dancer.

Beginning in 1931, she appeared in more than 110 films. She was one of France's great movie stars and her eight-decade career was among the longest in film history.

== Life and career ==
Darrieux was born on 1 May 1917 in Bordeaux, France, during World War I, the daughter of Marie-Louise (Witkowski) and Jean Darrieux, a medical doctor who was serving in the French Army. Her mother was born in Algeria. Her father died when she was seven years old.

Raised in Paris, she studied the cello at the Conservatoire de Musique. At 14, she won a part in the musical film Le Bal (1931). Her beauty combined with her singing and dancing ability led to numerous other offers; the film Mayerling (1936) brought her to prominence.

In 1935, Darrieux married director/screenwriter Henri Decoin, who encouraged her to try Hollywood. She signed a seven-year contract with Universal Studios to star in The Rage of Paris (1938) opposite Douglas Fairbanks, Jr. Afterwards, she elected to return to Paris.

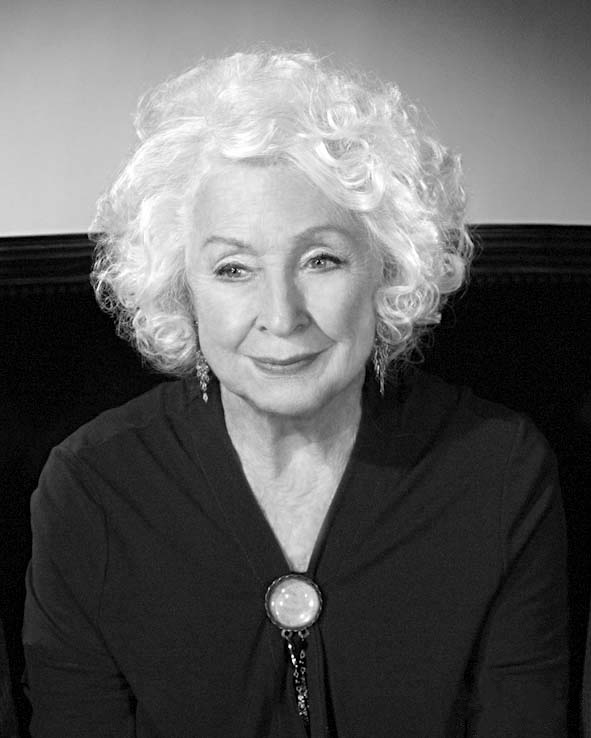
Danielle Darrieux in 2008

Under the German occupation of France during World War II, Darrieux continued to perform, a decision that was severely criticized by her compatriots. However, it is reported that her brother had been threatened with deportation by Alfred Greven, the German manager of Continental, the only film production company permitted in occupied France. She received a divorce and then fell in love with Porfirio Rubirosa, a Dominican Republic diplomat and notorious womanizer. They married in 1942 in Vichy in a ceremony attended by other diplomats that resided in the city at the time. His anti-Nazi opinions resulted in his forced residence in Germany. In exchange for Rubirosa's freedom, Darrieux agreed to make a promotional trip in Berlin. The couple lived in Switzerland until the end of the war, and divorced in 1947. She married scriptwriter Georges Mitsikidès in 1948, and they lived together until his death in 1991.

In 1950, the actress starred in Max Ophüls' La Ronde. When he was interviewed for the Criterion edition of his father's masterpiece, Marcel Ophüls described her as his father's favorite performer, and her performance is notable for its deft mixture of sensuality and ironic hauteur. Darrieux appeared in the MGM musical Rich, Young and Pretty (1951). Joseph L. Mankiewicz lured her back to Hollywood to star in 5 Fingers (1952) with James Mason. Upon returning to France, she appeared in Max Ophüls' The Earrings of Madame de... (1953) with Charles Boyer, and The Red and the Black (1954) with Gérard Philippe. She starred in Lady Chatterley's Lover (1955), whose theme of uninhibited sexuality led to its being proscribed by Catholic censors in the United States. She played a supporting role in her last American film, United Artists' epic Alexander the Great (1956) starring Richard Burton and Claire Bloom.

At the request of director Lewis Gilbert, Darrieux worked in England to shoot The Greengage Summer (1961) with Kenneth More. In 1963, she starred in the romantic comedy La Robe Mauve de Valentine at the Chatelet Theatre in Paris. The play was adapted from the novel by Françoise Sagan.

In Jacques Demy's film musical The Young Girls of Rochefort (1966) her role was the only one in which a principal actor in any of Demy's film-musicals sang his or her own musical parts. (All other actors had a separate person dub their singing parts.) During the 1960s, she also was a concert singer.

In 1970, Darrieux replaced Katharine Hepburn in the Broadway musical Coco, based on the life of Coco Chanel, but the play, essentially a showcase for Hepburn, soon folded without her. In 1971 and 1972 she also appeared in the short-lived productions of Ambassador. She worked again with Demy for his film Une chambre en ville (1982), an opera-like musical melodrama reminiscent of the director's earlier work The Umbrellas of Cherbourg (Les Parapluies de Cherbourg, 1964). Once again, Darrieux provided her own vocals for her songs.

== Honors ==
For her long service to the motion picture industry, in 1985 she was given an Honorary César Award. She continued to work, her career spanning eight decades, most recently providing the voice of the protagonist's grandmother in the animated feature Persepolis (2007), which deals with the impact of the Islamic revolution on a girl's life as she grows to adulthood in Iran.

== Death ==
Danielle Darrieux died on 17 October 2017, due to injuries from a fall, five months after turning 100 that May.

== Filmography ==
Year	Title	Role	Director	Notes
1931	Le Bal	Antoinette	Wilhelm Thiele	
1931	Coquecigrole	Coquecigrole	André Berthomieu	
1932	The Lacquered Box	Henriette Stenay	Jean Kemm	
1932	Panurge	Régine	Michel Bernheim	
1933	Honeymoon Trip	Minor Role	Germain Fried and Erich Schmidt	
1933	Dream Castle	Béatrix	Géza von Bolváry	
1934	Volga in Flames	Macha	Victor Tourjansky	
1934	The Crisis is Over	Nicole Nadin	Robert Siodmak	
1934	Mauvaise Graine	Jeannette	Billy Wilder and Alexander Esway	
1934	One Night's Secret	Minor Role	Félix Gandéra	Uncredited
1934	My Heart Is Calling You	Nicole Nadin	Carmine Gallone and Serge Véber	
1934	L'auberge du Petit-Dragon		Jean de Limur	
1934	Dédé	Denise	René Guissart	
1934	Gold in the Street	Gaby	Curtis Bernhardt	
1935	Le contrôleur des wagons-lits	Annie Bourguet	Richard Eichberg	
1935	Mad Girl	Lucie	Léo Joannon	
1935	J'aime toutes les femmes	Danielle	Karel Lamač and Henri Decoin	
1935	The Green Domino	Hélène / Marianne de Richmond	Herbert Selpin and Henri Decoin	
1936	Mademoiselle Mozart	Denise	Yvan Noé	
1936	Mayerling	Maria Vetsera	Anatole Litvak	
1936	Taras Bulba	Marina	Alexis Granowsky	
1936	Women's Club	Claire Derouve	Jacques Deval	
1936	Counsel for Romance	Jacqueline Serval	Jean Boyer and Raoul Ploquin	
1936	Port Arthur	Youki	Nicolas Farkas	
1937	My Mother Is a Miss	Jacqueline Letournel	Henri Decoin	
1937	Abused Confidence	Lydia	Henri Decoin	
1938	The Rage of Paris	Nicole de Cortillion	Henry Koster	
1938	Katia	Katia Dolgoronsky	Maurice Tourneur	
1938	Return at Dawn	Anita Ammer	Henri Decoin	
1940	Beating Heart	Arlette	Henri Decoin	
1941	Her First Affair	Micheline Chevasse	Henri Decoin	
1942	Caprices	Lise	Léo Joannon	
1942	Twisted Mistress	Lilian Rander	André Cayatte	
1947	Bethsabée	Arabella Dalvert	Léonide Moguy	
1948	Ruy Blas	Queen of Spain	Pierre Billon	
1949	Jean de la Lune	Marceline - une jeune femme charmante mais volage	Marcel Achard	
1949	Keep an Eye on Amelia	Amélie d'Avranches	Claude Autant-Lara	
1950	La Ronde	Emma Breitkopf	Max Ophüls	
1950	Romanzo d'amore	Archduchess Louise of Austria	Duilio Coletti	
1951	Rich, Young and Pretty	Marie Devaronne	Norman Taurog	
1951	La maison Bonnadieu	Gabrielle Bonnadieu	Carlo Rim	
1952	The Truth About Bebe Donge	Elisabeth "Bébé" Donge	Henri Decoin	
1952	House of Pleasure	Madame Rosa	Max Ophüls	(segment "La Maison Tellier")
1952	5 Fingers	Countess Anna Staviska	Joseph L. Mankiewicz	
1952	Adorable Creatures	Christine	Christian-Jaque	
1953	Good Lord Without Confession	Janine Fréjoul	Claude Autant-Lara	
1953	The Earrings of Madame de...	Countess Louise	Max Ophüls	
1954	El torero	Geneviève Dupré	René Wheeler	
1954	Service Entrance	Béatrice Berthier	Carlo Rim	
1954	Le Rouge et le Noir	Madame de Rénal	Claude Autant-Lara	
1954	One Step to Eternity	Constance Andrieux dite Poussy	Henri Decoin	
1955	Napoléon	Eléonore Denuelle de La Plaigne	Sacha Guitry	
1955	The Affair of the Poisons	Madame de Montespan	Henri Decoin	
1955	Lady Chatterley's Lover	Constance Chatterley	Marc Allégret	
1956	If Paris Were Told to Us	Agnès Sorel	Sacha Guitry	
1956	Alexander the Great	Olympias	Robert Rossen	
1956	The Wages of Sin	Isabelle Lindstrom	Denys de La Patellière	
1957	Typhoon Over Nagasaki	Françoise Fabre	Yves Ciampi	
1957	Lovers of Paris	Caroline Hédouin	Julien Duvivier	
1958	Seventh Heaven	Brigitte de Lédouville	Raymond Bernard	
1958	Le désordre et la nuit	Thérèse Marken	Gilles Grangier	
1958	Life Together	Monique Lebeaut	Clément Duhour	
1958	Sunday Encounter	Catherine Brévent	Marc Allégret	
1959	Marie-Octobre	Marie-Hélène Dumoulin (aka "Marie-Octobre")	Julien Duvivier	
1959	Eyes of Love	Jeanne Moncatel	Denys de La Patellière	
1960	Murder at 45 R.P.M.	Eve Faugeres	Étienne Périer	
1960	L'Homme à femmes	Gabrielle / Françoise	Jacques-Gérard Cornu	
1961	The Greengage Summer	Madame Zisi	Lewis Gilbert	
1961	Long Live Henry IV... Long Live Love	Henriette d'Entragues	Claude Autant-Lara	
1961	The Lions Are Loose	Marie-Laure Robert-Guichard	Henri Verneuil	
1961	Les bras de la nuit	Danielle Garnier	Jacques Guymont	
1961	Les petits drames		Paul Vecchiali	Cameo appearance
1962	Le Crime ne paie pas	Lucienne Marsais	Gérard Oury	(segment "L'homme de l'avenue")
1962	The Devil and the Ten Commandments	Clarisse Ardan	Julien Duvivier	(segment "Tes père et mère honoreras")
1962	Pourquoi Paris?	La prostituée	Denys de La Patellière	
1963	Bluebeard	Berthe Héon	Claude Chabrol	
1963	Be Careful Ladies	Hedwige	André Hunebelle	
1964	Du grabuge chez les veuves	Judith	Jacques Poitrenaud	
1964	Patate	Edith Rollo	Robert Thomas	
1965	Le coup de grâce	Yolande	Jean Cayrol and Claude Durand	
1965	The Duke's Gold	Marie-Gabrielle de M.	Jacques Baratier	
1967	Le dimanche de la vie	Julia Ségovie	Jean Vautrin	
1967	The Young Girls of Rochefort	Yvonne Garnier	Jacques Demy	
1968	L'Homme à la Buick	Mme Dalayrac	Gilles Grangier	
1968	24 Hours in the Life of a Woman	Lady Alice Copland	Dominique Delouche	
1968	Birds in Peru	Madame Fernande	Romain Gary	
1969	La maison de campagne	Lorette Boiselier	Jean Girault	
1969	The Lonely Woman	Teresa / Jaci's mother	Francisco Rovira Beleta	
1975	Divine	Marion Renoir	Dominique Delouche	
1976	L'Année sainte	Christina	Jean Girault	
1979	Le cavaleur	Suzanne Taylor	Philippe de Broca	
1979	Miss a. k. a. Ein Fall für Madame	Miss	Roger Pigaut	6 episodes, (French-German TV miniseries, aired in 1979)
1982	Une chambre en ville	Margot Langlois	Jacques Demy	
1983	At the Top of the Stairs	Françoise Canavaggia	Paul Vecchiali	
1986	Scene of the Crime	grandmother	André Téchiné	
1986	Corps et biens	Madame Krantz	Benoît Jacquot	
1988	A Few Days with Me	Madame Pasquier (Martial's mother)	Claude Sautet	
1989	Bille en tête	l'Arquebuse	Carlo Cotti	
1991	Le jour des rois	Armande	Marie-Claude Treilhou	
1992	Les mamies	Lolotte	Annick Lanoë	
1994	Jalna	Adeline Whiteoak	Gérard Marx	Canadian-French TV series in 8 episodes
2000	Tomorrow's Another Day	Eva	Jeanne Labrune	
2001	8 Women	Mamy	François Ozon	
2003	Les Liaisons dangereuses	Madame de Rosemonde	Josée Dayan	2 episodes
2004	Une vie à t'attendre	Emilie	Thierry Klifa	
2006	Oh La La!	Odette Saint-Gilles	Anne Fontaine	
2007	Persepolis	grandmother	Vincent Paronnaud and Marjane Satrapi	Voice
2007	L'Heure Zéro	Camille Tressilian	Pascal Thomas	
2010	Pièce montée	Madeleine	Denys Granier-Deferre	
2010	C'est toi, c'est tout	Camille	Jacques Santamaria	TV movie

== Awards ==
Year	Awards	Category	Film	Result
1987	César Award	Best Supporting Actress	Scene of the Crime	Nominated
2002	Berlin International Film Festival	Silver Bear – Outstanding Artistic Achievement	8 Women	Won
2002	César Award	Best Supporting Actress	8 Women	Nominated
2002	European Film Awards	Best Actress (all the cast)	8 Women	Won
2002	Online Film Critics Society	Best Cast	8 Women	Nominated
