= Roland Tual =

French film director and producer

- Born: 10 November 1902; 12th arrondissement of Paris
- Died: 29 August 1956 (aged 53); Saint-Cloud
- Occupation(s): Director; Producer.

Roland Tual (10 November 1902 – 29 August 1956) was a French director and producer.

First married to Colette Jéramec, the daughter of a rich Parisian industrialist, Tual then married the producer and director Denise Piazza, also known under the name Denise Tual.

Very close to surrealists, he was a friend of the painter André Masson in the 1920s.

He had financial interests in the daily Le Monde.

== Filmography ==
Unit production manager

- 1932: Fantômas by Pál Fejös
- 1938: Mollenard by Robert Siodmak
- 1938: La bête humaine by Jean Renoir
- 1939: La Loi du nord by Jacques Feyder
- 1941: Remorques by Jean Grémillon
- 1945: Espoir by André Malraux and Boris Peskine based on the work by Malraux

Producer

- 1941: The Pavilion Burns by Jacques de Baroncelli
- 1942: Love Letters by Claude Autant-Lara
- 1945: L'Espoir by André Malraux and Boris Peskine based on the work by Malraux
- 1950: Ce siècle a cinquante ans by Roland Tual, Denise Tual and Werner Malbran

Director

- 1942: Le Lit à colonnes
- 1944: Bonsoir mesdames, bonsoir messieurs
- 1950: Ce siècle a cinquante ans by Roland Tual, Denise Tual and Werner Malbran

Art director

- 1932: Fanny by Marc Allégret
