= Pierre Bost =

French writer

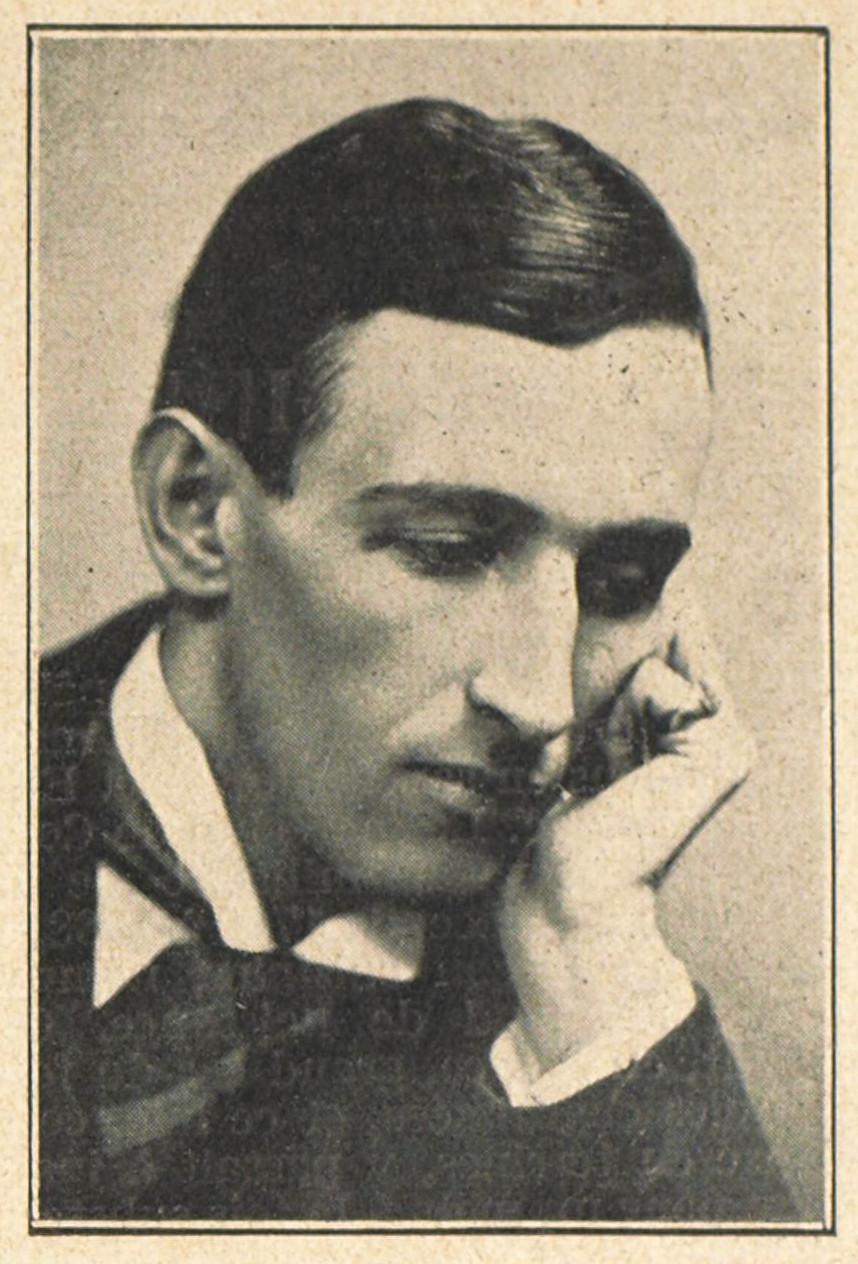
- Born: 5 September 1901; Lasalle, Gard, France
- Died: 6 December 1975 (aged 74); Paris, France
- Occupations: Screenwriter, novelist, and journalist

Pierre Bost (5 September 1901 – 6 December 1975) was a French screenwriter, novelist, and journalist. Primarily a novelist until the 1940s, he was known mainly as a screenwriter after 1945, often collaborating with Jean Aurenche.

In his 1954 article Une Certaine Tendance du Cinéma Français ("A Certain Trend of French Cinema"), François Truffaut attacked the current state of French films, singling out certain screenwriters and producers. The screenwriting team of Bost and Aurenche were criticized for their style of literary adaptations in particular, which Truffaut considered old-fashioned.

The journalist Jacques-Laurent Bost was Pierre Bost's brother.

== Selected filmography ==
- The Mondesir Heir (1940)
- The Man Who Played with Fire (1942)
- Sideral Cruises (1942)
- The Trump Card (1942)
- La Symphonie Pastorale (1946)
- Patrie (1946)
- Devil in the Flesh (1947)
- The Seventh Door (1947)
- The Glass Castle (1950)
- God Needs Men (1950)
- The Red Inn (1951)
- Forbidden Games (1952)
- Le Rouge et le Noir (1954)
- The Little Rebels (1955)
- Gervaise (1956)
- Rendezvous (1961)
- Les amitiés particulières (1964)
- The Judge and the Assassin (1976)

== Bibliography ==
- Hercule et mademoiselle, Paris, Éditions Gallimard, 1924, 218 p.
- L'imbécile, Paris, Éditions Gallimard, 1924
- Prétextat, Paris, Éditions Gallimard, 1925, 221 p.
- Voyage de l'esclave, Paris, Éditions Marcelle Lesage, 1926, 83 p.
- Crise de croissance, Paris, Éditions Gallimard, 1926, 218 p.
- À la porte, Paris, Au sans pareil, 1927, 126 p.; coll. « Le Conciliabule des trente »
- Faillite, Paris, Éditions Gallimard, 1928, 252 p.
- Anaïs, Paris, Éditions Gallimard, 1930, 218 p.
- Briançon, Grenoble, Éditions Dardelet, 1930, 96 p.
- Mesdames et messieurs, Paris, Éditions Gallimard, 1931, 253 p.
- Le Scandale, Paris, Éditions Gallimard, 1931, 415 p.
- Faux numéros, Paris, Éditions Gallimard, 1932, 253 p.
- Un grand personnage, Paris, Éditions Gallimard, 1935 (réimpr. 1961), 221 p.
- Homicide par imprudence, Paris, Éditions Gallimard, 1936, 216 p.
- La haute fourche, Paris, Éditions de Minuit, 1945, 77 p.
- Monsieur Ladmiral va bientôt mourir, Paris, Éditions Gallimard, 1945; réédition 2005, coll. « L'Imaginaire », 102 p. (ISBN 978-2070773640)
- Porte-Malheur, Paris, Éditions Le Dilettante, (éd. or. 1932) 2009 (1re éd. 1932), 160 p. (ISBN 978-2-84263-172-7)
- Un an dans un tiroir, Paris, Éditions Le Dilettante, (éd. or. 1945) 2010 (1re éd. 1945), 128 p. (ISBN 978-2842631888)

As co-author:

- Pierre Bost, Pierre Darbon and Pierre Quet, La Puissance et la Gloire, Paris, Robert Laffont, 1952, 221 p.
- Claude-André Puget and Pierre Bost, Un nommé Judas, Paris, La Table Ronde, 1956, 191 p.
- Jean Aurenche, Pierre Bost, Claude Brule and Georges Neveux, Molière pour rire et pour pleurer, Paris, Presses de la Cité, 1973, 258 p.
