= List of thriller films of the 1960s =

A list of thriller films released in the 1960s.

Title	Director	Cast	Country	Subgenre/notes
1960
The 1000 Eyes of Dr. Mabuse	Fritz Lang	Peter van Eyck, Gert Fröbe, Dawn Addams	West Germany; Italy; France	Crime thriller
Classe Tous Risques	Claude Sautet	Lino Ventura, Jean-Paul Belmondo, Sandra Milo	Italy; France	Crime thriller
The Housemaid	Kim Ki-young		South Korea	
Key Witness	Phil Karlson	Jeffrey Hunter, Dennis Hopper, Joby Baker	United States	
Midnight Lace	David Miller	Doris Day, Rex Harrison, John Gavin	United States	
Paris Belongs to Us	Jacques Rivette	Betty Schneider, Gianni Esposito, Françoise Prevost	France	Psychological thriller
Peeping Tom	Michael Powell	Karl Heinz Böhm, Moira Shearer, Anna Massey	United Kingdom	
Portrait in Black	Michael Gordon	Lana Turner, Anthony Quinn, Sandra Dee	United States	Crime thriller
Psycho	Alfred Hitchcock	Anthony Perkins, Janet Leigh, Vera Miles	United States	
Purple Noon	René Clément	Alain Delon, Maurice Ronet, Marie Laforêt	France; Italy	
The Sinister Urge	Edward D. Wood, Jr.	Carl Anthony, Conrad Brooks, Kenne Duncan	United States	Psychological thriller
1961
Blast of Silence	Allen Baron	Allen Baron, Molly McCarthy, Larry Tucker	United States	Crime thriller
Le Cave Se Rebiffe	Gilles Grangier	Jean Gabin, Martine Carol, Bernard Blier	France; Italy	Comedy thriller
The Dead Eyes of London	Alfred Vohrer	Joachim Fuchsberger, Karin Baal, Dieter Borsche	West Germany	Crime thriller
Five Minutes to Live	Bill Karn	Johnny Cash, Donald Woods, Cay Forester	United States	
Lemmy pour les dames	Bernard Borderie	Eddie Constantine, Françoise Brion, Robert Berri	France	
Night Tide	Curtis Harrington	Dennis Hopper, Linda Lawson, Gavin Muir	United States	
Pleins feux sur l'assassin	Georges Franju	Pierre Brasseur, Pascale Audret, Marianne Koch	France	Psychological thriller
Taste of Fear	Seth Holt	Susan Strasberg, Ronald Lewis, Ann Todd	United Kingdom	
Underworld U.S.A.	Samuel Fuller	Cliff Robertson, Dolores Dorn, Beatrice Kay	United States	Crime thriller
1962
The Burning Court	Julien Duvivier	Jean-Claude Brialy, Perette Pradier, Nadja Tiller	United States; France; Italy	
The Cabinet of Caligari	Roger Kay	Glynis Johns, Dan O'Herlihy, Dick Davalos	United Kingdom; United States	Psychological thriller
Cape Fear	J. Lee Thompson	Gregory Peck, Robert Mitchum	United States	
Carnival of Souls	Herk Harvey	Candace Hilligoss, Frances Feist, Sidney Berger	United States	Psychological thriller, supernatural thriller
Le Doulos	Jean-Pierre Melville	Jean-Paul Belmondo, Serge Reggiani, Monique Hennessy	France; Italy	Crime thriller
Experiment in Terror	Blake Edwards	Glenn Ford, Lee Remick, Stefanie Powers	United States	
The Manchurian Candidate	John Frankenheimer	Frank Sinatra, Laurence Harvey, Janet Leigh	United States	
Tales of Terror	Roger Corman	Peter Lorre, Basil Rathbone, Debra Paget	United States	
What Ever Happened to Baby Jane?	Robert Aldrich	Bette Davis, Joan Crawford, Victor Buono	United States	
1963
Charade	Stanley Donen	Cary Grant, Audrey Hepburn, Walter Matthau	United States	Comedy thriller
Children of the Damned	Tony Leader	Ian Hendry, Alan Badel, Barbara Ferris	United Kingdom	
Le meurtrier	Claude Autant-Lara	Robert Hossein, Marina Vlady, Yvonne Furneaux	West Germany; France; Italy	
The Girl Who Knew Too Much	Mario Bava	Valentina Cortese, Gianni di Benedetto, Dante DiPaolo	Italy	
Maniac	Michael Carreras	Kerwin Mathews, Nadia Gray, Donald Houston	United Kingdom; United States	
The Mind Benders	Basil Dearden	Dirk Bogarde, Mary Ure, John Clements	United Kingdom; United States	Paranoid thriller
The Prize	Mark Robson	Paul Newman, Edward G. Robinson, Elke Sommer	United States	
The Sadist	James Landis	Arch Hall, Jr., Helen Hovey, Richard Alden	United States	
Shock Corridor	Samuel Fuller	Peter Breck, Constance Towers, Gene Evans	United States	Psychological thriller
Judex	Georges Franju	Channing Pollock, Francine Bergé, Édith Scob	France; Italy	Crime thriller
X: The Man with X-Ray Eyes	Roger Corman	Ray Milland, Diana Van Der Vlis, Harold J. Stone	United States	Supernatural thriller
Youth of the Beast	Seijun Suzuki	Joe Shishido	Japan	Crime thriller
1964
Blood and Black Lace	Mario Bava	Cameron Mitchell, Eva Bartók, Thomas Reiner	Italy; West Germany; France	
Dead Ringer	Paul Henreid	Bette Davis, Karl Malden, Peter Lawford	United States	
Dr. Orloff's Monster	Jesús Franco	Marcelo Arroita-Jauregui, Hugo Blanco, Perla Cristal	Austria; Spain	Psychological thriller
Fail-Safe	Sidney Lumet	Henry Fonda, Walter Matthau, Frank Overton	United States	
Fantômas	André Hunebelle	Jean Marais, Louis de Funès, Mylène Demongeot	France; Italy	Comedy thriller
Du grabuge chez les veuves	Jacques Poitrenaud	Danielle Darrieux, Dany Carrel, Pascale de Boysson	France; Italy	Comedy thriller
Hush… Hush, Sweet Charlotte	Robert Aldrich	Bette Davis, Olivia de Havilland, Joseph Cotten	United States	
Joy House	René Clément	Alain Delon, Jane Fonda, Lola Albright	France; United States	
Lady in a Cage	Walter E. Grauman	Olivia de Havilland, Ann Sothern, Jeff Corey	United States	
Marnie	Alfred Hitchcock	Tippi Hedren, Sean Connery, Diane Baker	United States	Psychological thriller
Le monocle rit jaune	Georges Lautner	Paul Meurisse, Robert Dalban, Olivier Despax	France; Italy	Comedy thriller
Night Must Fall	Karel Reisz	Albert Finney, Susan Hampshire, Mona Washbourne	United Kingdom	
The Night Walker	William Castle	Robert Taylor, Barbara Stanwyck, Judi Meredith	United States	
Nightmare	Freddie Francis	David Knight, Moira Redmond, Brenda Bruce	United Kingdom	
Seven Days in May	John Frankenheimer	Burt Lancaster, Kirk Douglas, Fredric March	United States	
Shock Treatment	Denis Sanders	Stuart Whitman, Lauren Bacall, Carol Lynley	United States	
Strait-Jacket	William Castle	Joan Crawford, Diane Baker, Leif Erickson	United States	
Woman of Straw	Basil Dearden	Gina Lollobrigida, Sean Connery, Ralph Richardson	United Kingdom	
1965
The Bedford Incident	James B. Harris	Richard Widmark, Sidney Poitier, James MacArthur	United Kingdom; United States	
Bunny Lake Is Missing	Otto Preminger	Carol Lynley, Keir Dullea, Laurence Olivier	United Kingdom; United States	Psychological thriller
The Collector	William Wyler	Terence Stamp, Samantha Eggar, Maurice Dallimore	United Kingdom; United States	
Fanatic	Silvio Narizzano	Tallulah Bankhead, Stefanie Powers, Peter Vaughan	United Kingdom	
Fantômas se déchaîne	André Hunebelle	Jean Marais, Louis de Funès, Mylène Demongeot	France; Italy	Comedy thriller
Hysteria	Freddie Francis	Robert Webber, Anthony Newlands, Jennifer Jayne	United Kingdom	
I Saw What You Did	William Castle	Joan Crawford, John Ireland, Leif Erickson	United States	
The IPCRESS File	Sidney J. Furie	Michael Caine, Nigel Green, Guy Doleman	United Kingdom	
La Métamorphose des cloportes	Pierre Granier-Deferre	Lino Ventura, Charles Aznavour, Maurice Biraud	France; Italy	Crime thriller
Mirage	Edward Dmytryk	Gregory Peck, Diane Bake, Walter Matthau	United States	Psychological thriller
The Nanny	Seth Holt	Bette Davis, Wendy Craig, Jill Bennett	United Kingdom	
Repulsion	Roman Polanski	Catherine Deneuve, Ian Hendry, John Fraser	United Kingdom	
The Sleeping Car Murders	Costa-Gavras	Yves Montand, Jean-Louis Trintignant, Pierre Mondy	France	
Ten Little Indians	George Pollock	Hugh O'Brian, Shirley Eaton, Fabian	United Kingdom	
Thunderball	Terence Young	Sean Connery, Claudine Auger, Adolfo Celi	United Kingdom	Action thriller
1966
Arabesque	Stanley Donen	Gregory Peck, Sophia Loren, Alan Badel	United Kingdom; United States	
Blow-Up	Michelangelo Antonioni	David Hemmings, Vanessa Redgrave, Sarah Miles	United Kingdom; Italy	Psychological thriller
Cul-de-sac	Roman Polanski	Donald Pleasence, Françoise Dorléac, Lionel Stander	United Kingdom	Comedy thriller
Le Deuxième souffle	Jean-Pierre Melville	Lino Ventura, Paul Meurisse, Raymond Pellegrin	France	Crime thriller
Funeral in Berlin	Guy Hamilton	Michael Caine, Paul Hubschmid, Oscar Homolka	United Kingdom	
Gambit	Ronald Neame	Shirley MacLaine, Michael Caine, Herbert Lom	United States	Comedy thriller
Made in U.S.A.	Jean-Luc Godard	Anna Karina, Jean-Pierre Léaud, László Szabó	France	Crime thriller
Seconds	John Frankenheimer	Rock Hudson, Salome Jens, John Randolph	United States	
Tokyo Drifter	Seijun Suzuki	Tetsuya Watari, Tamio Kawachi, Hideaki Nitani	Japan	Crime thriller
Torn Curtain	Alfred Hitchcock	Paul Newman, Julie Andrews, Lila Kedrova	United States	
The Wild Angels	Roger Corman	Peter Fonda, Nancy Sinatra, Bruce Dern	United States	Action thriller
1967
Branded to Kill	Seijun Suzuki	Joe Shishido, Koji Nanbara, Annu Mari, Mariko Ogawa	Japan	Crime thriller
The Champagne Murders	Claude Chabrol	Anthony Perkins, Maurice Ronet, Yvonne Furneaux	France	Psychological thriller
Col Cuore in Gola	Tinto Brass	Jean-Louis Trintignant, Ewa Aulin, Roberto Bisacco	Italy; France	
Diabolically Yours	Julien Duvivier	Senta Berger, Alain Delon, Sergio Fantoni	France; Italy; West Germany	
Fantômas contre Scotland Yard	André Hunebelle	Jean Marais, Louis de Funès, Mylène Demongeot	France	Comedy thriller
Games	Curtis Harrington	Simone Signoret, James Caan, Katharine Ross	United States	
Grand Slam	Giuliano Montaldo	Edward G. Robinson	Italy; West Germany; Spain	Crime thriller
The Incident	Larry Peerce	Tony Musante, Martin Sheen, Beau Bridges	United States	
The Night of the Generals	Anatole Litvak	Peter O'Toole, Omar Sharif, Tom Courtenay	France; United Kingdom	Psychological thriller
Point Blank	John Boorman	Lee Marvin, Angie Dickinson, Keenan Wynn	United States	Crime thriller
La route de Corinthe	Claude Chabrol	Maurice Ronet, Jean Seberg, Michel Bouquet	West Germany; France; Italy; Greece	
Le Samouraï	Jean-Pierre Melville	Alain Delon, Nathalie Delon, Cathy Rosier	France; Italy	
Tony Rome	Gordon Douglas	Frank Sinatra, Jill St. John, Richard Conte	United States	
Wait Until Dark	Terence Young	Audrey Hepburn, Alan Arkin, Richard Crenna	United States	
1968
Adieu l'ami	Jean Herman	Alain Delon, Charles Bronson, Olga Georges-Picot	France; Italy	
The Bride Wore Black	François Truffaut	Jeanne Moreau, Claude Rich, Jean-Claude Brialy	France; Italy	
Bullitt	Peter Yates	Steve McQueen, Robert Vaughn, Jacqueline Bisset	United States	
Il dolce corpo di Deborah	Romolo Guerrieri	Carroll Baker, Jean Sorel, Evelyn Stewart	Italy; France	
Il giorno della civetta	Damiano Damiani	Claudia Cardinale, Franco Nero, Lee J. Cobb	Italy; France	Crime thriller
Ice Station Zebra	John Sturges	Rock Hudson, Ernest Borgnine, Patrick McGoohan	United States	Action thriller
Lady In Cement	Gordon Douglas	Frank Sinatra, Raquel Welch, Richard Conte	United States	
Madigan	Don Siegel	Richard Widmark, Henry Fonda, Inger Stevens	United States	
No Way to Treat a Lady	Jack Smight	Rod Steiger, Lee Remick, George Segal	United States	Comedy thriller
Nude... si muore	Anthony M. Dawson	Michael Rennie, Mark Damon, Eleanora Brown	Italy; United States	
Pretty Poison	Noel Black	Anthony Perkins, Tuesday Weld, Beverly Garland	United States	
Psych-Out	Richard Rush	Susan Strasberg, Dean Stockwell, Jack Nicholson	United States	Crime thriller
Rosemary's Baby	Roman Polanski	Mia Farrow, John Cassavetes, Ruth Gordon	United States	Psychological thriller
Targets	Peter Bogdanovich	Boris Karloff, Tim O'Kelly, Nancy Hsueh	United States	
Twisted Nerve	Roy Boulting	Hayley Mills, Hywel Bennett, Billie Whitelaw	United Kingdom	
1969
The Bird with the Crystal Plumage	Dario Argento	Tony Musante, Suzy Kendall, Eva Renzi	Italy; West Germany	
The Laughing Woman	Piero Schivazappa	Philippe Leroy, Dagmar Lassander	Italy	
Paranoia	Umberto Lenzi	Carroll Baker, Lou Castel, Colette Descombes	Italy; France	
Paroxismus	Jesús Franco	James Darren, Barbara McNair, Klaus Kinski	West Germany; Italy; United Kingdom	
A Quiet Place in the Country	Elio Petri	Franco Nero, Vanessa Redgrave, Georges Géret	Italy; France	
So Sweet... So Perverse	Umberto Lenzi	Carroll Baker, Jean-Louis Trintignant, Erika Blanc	Italy; France; West Germany	
This Man Must Die	Claude Chabrol	Michel Duchaussoy, Caroline Cellier, Jean Yanne	France; Italy	
Topaz	Alfred Hitchcock	Frederick Stafford, Dany Robin, John Vernon	United Kingdom; United States	Political thriller
What Ever Happened to Aunt Alice?	Lee H. Katzin	Geraldine Page, Ruth Gordon, Rosemary Forsyth	United States	
Z	Costa-Gavras	Yves Montand, Irene Papas, Jean-Louis Trintignant	France; Algeria	
