= Caxton Club =

Private social club and bibliophilic society

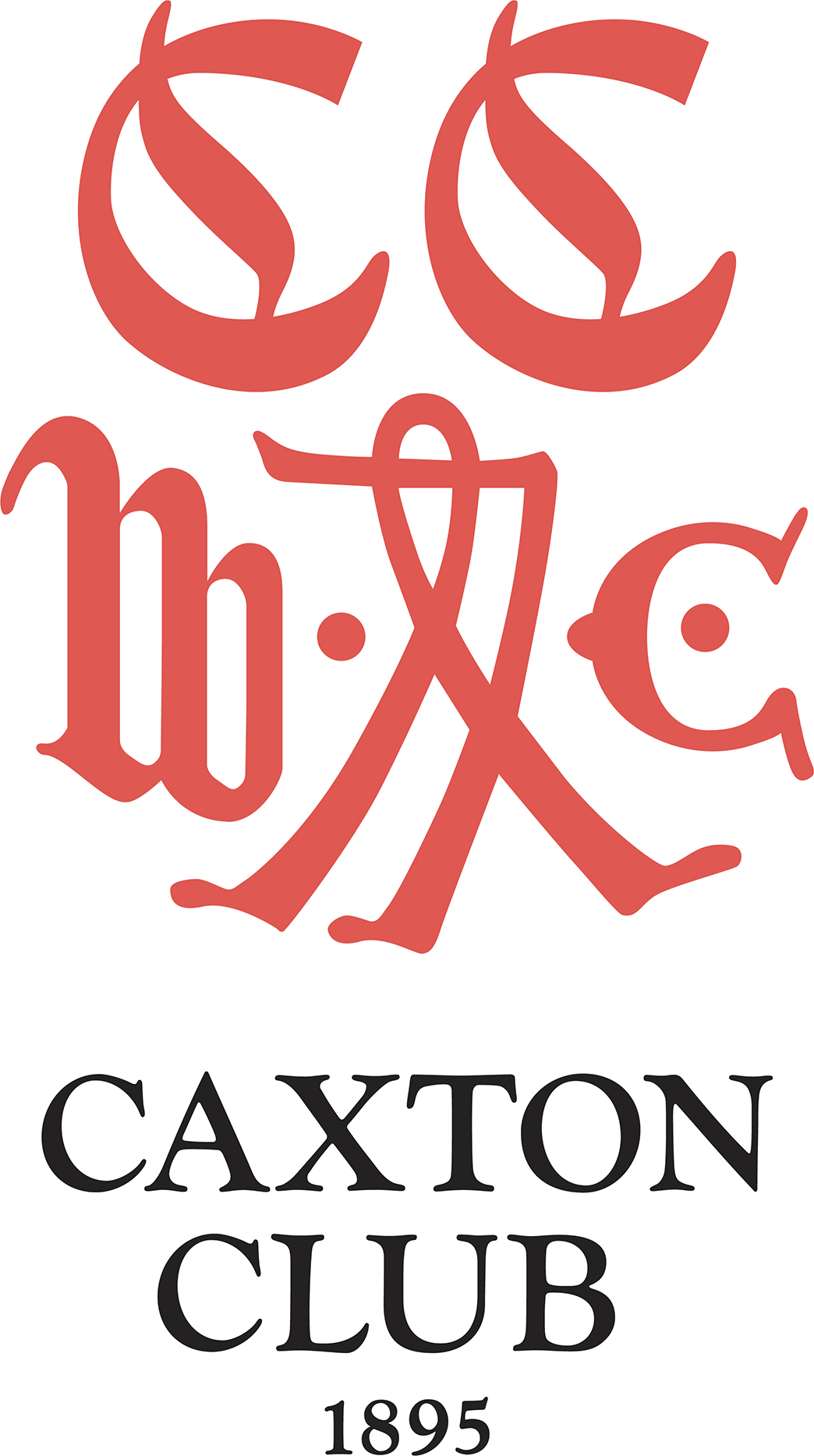
- Formation: January 26, 1895; 131 years ago
- Type: Social club
- Purpose: To promote the book arts and the history of the book
- Headquarters: 60 W. Walton St., Chicago, Illinois
- Location: Chicago, Illinois
- President: Sarah M. Pritchard
- Main organ: Caxtonian
- Website: www.caxtonclub.org

The Caxton Club is a private social club and bibliophilic society founded in Chicago in 1895 to promote the book arts and the history of the book. To further its goals, the club hosts monthly events, collaborates with institutions like the Newberry Library, and publishes works including The Caxtonian. The Caxton Club is a member club of the Fellowship of American Bibliophilic Societies.

== History ==
The Caxton Club was founded in 1895 by a group of fifteen bibliophiles to support the publication of fine books in the style of the Arts and Crafts Movement. The club's name honors the fifteenth-century English printer William Caxton. The founders included John Vance Cheney, Edward E. Ayer, Martin A. Ryerson, James Ellsworth, Charles L. Hutchinson, and Washington Irving Way and Chauncey L. Williams (of Way & Williams).

In 1976, women began to be admitted as members of the Caxton Club, departing from the era's common gentlemen's clubs practices. Mary Beth Beal is notable for being the Caxton Club’s first female President in 1985-1986.

In 1995 the Caxton Club centenary was celebrated with publication of The Caxton Club, 1895–1995: Celebrating a Century of the Book in Chicago which has been characterized as a "significant addition to the history of American bibliophily."

The Club published several fine editions in partnership with the Lakeside Press of Chicago.

The Club awards scholarships and grants to students and researchers in the book arts.

== Notable members ==
- Sydney E. Berger—educator, librarian, rare books expert
- Thomas Kimball Brooker - book collector, businessman
- Gwendolyn Brooks – author, poet
- Francis Fisher Browne – editor
- Lee Pierce Butler – bibliographer, librarian, professor
- Michèle V. Cloonan - librarian, professor
- John Y. Cole - founding director of the Center for the Book at the Library of Congress
- Charles Deering - businessman, art collector, philanthropist
- Robert B. Downs - librarian, author
- Alexander Wilson Drake – artist, collector, critic
- James Ellsworth – banker, industrialist
- Charles Lang Freer – art collector, industrialist, philanthropist
- Herman H. Fussler-Librarian, Dean of the University of Chicago Graduate Library School
- Michael Gorman – librarian
- Frederic Goudy - printer, artist and type designer
- Gustaf VI Adolf of Sweden – book collector and scholar
- Nancy Gwinn - director Smithsonian Libraries
- Theodore Wesley Koch - librarian, translator
- Henry Eduard Legler – activist, librarian
- Frank Orren Lowden – 25th governor of Illinois, United States representative IL, candidate Republican presidential nominations 1920, 1928
- Beverly Lynch - librarian
- William Mulliken – Olympic swimmer
- Kenneth Nebenzahl - antiquarian book- and mapseller, author, supporter and benefactor of history of cartography.
- Audrey Niffenegger – author and artist
- Stanley Pargellis - Director of the Newberry Library, 1942 to 1962
- Lawrence Clark Powell -librarian
- Sarah M. Pritchard – librarian
- Carl B. Roden – librarian
- Ralph Fletcher Seymour – artist, author, publisher
- David Spadafora - historian, President, Newberry Library
- Vincent Starrett – author and newspaperman
- Peggy Sullivan - library historian, librarian
- Robert Wedgeworth – librarian and executive
- Frank Lloyd Wright – architect

== Publications ==
In the course of its history, the Caxton Club has published formal publications and other printed pieces. These include The French Bookbinders of the Eighteenth Century, The Cowboy in American Literature by J. Frank Dobie, Tales for Bibliophiles. and Imaginary Books and Libraries.

A complete listing of the publications is available here: club’s publications.

== See also ==
- List of American gentlemen's clubs
- Books in the United States
