= Francis Fisher Browne =

American journalist (1843–1913)

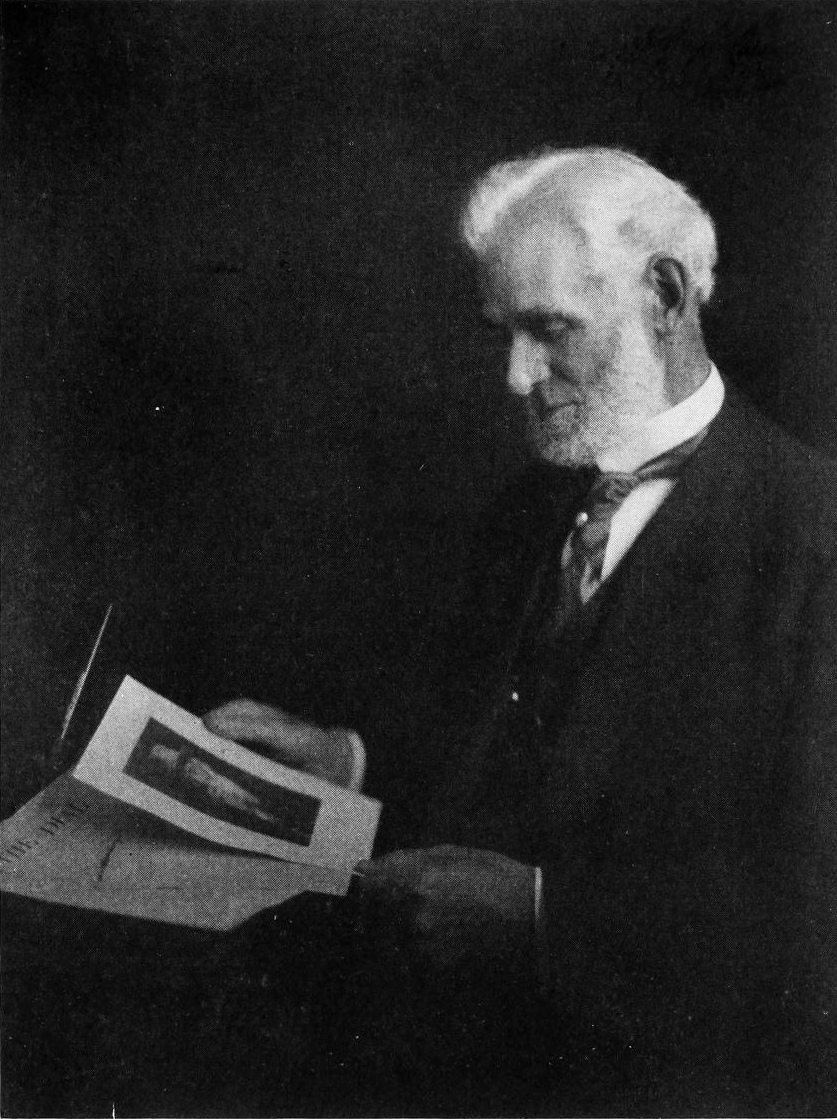
- Born: December 1, 1843; South Halifax, Vermont, U.S.
- Died: May 11, 1913 (aged 69); Santa Barbara, California, U.S.
- Resting place: Mountain View Cemetery and Mausoleum, Altadena, California
- Occupations: Author; poet; literary critic
- Spouse: Susan Seaman Brooks Browne
- Children: Nine children

Francis Fisher Browne (December 1, 1843 – May 11, 1913) was an American editor, poet, and literary critic. Browne was one of the founders and later, an honorary member of the Chicago Literary Club, the Caxton Club (Chicago) and The Twilight Club of Pasadena (California). He served as the Chairman of Committee on Congress at the World's Congress Auxiliary of the Columbian Exhibition, (Chicago World's Fair) in the summer of 1893.

Browne was at the forefront of the 20th century intellectual and literary scene in Chicago, Illinois. A transplant from New England, Browne settled in Chicago in 1867 and founded the literary journal, The Dial, which was a revival of Margaret Fuller's transcendental periodical and served as a venue for modernist literature. Over the years, he had become close friends with John Muir, John Burroughs, Walt Whitman, and other notable figures.

== Biography ==
=== Early life ===
Browne was born in South Halifax, Vermont, to parents William Goldsmith Browne and Eunice (Fisher) Browne. His father was a poet, best known for his poem and hymn, "A Hundred Years To Come." Browne learned the printing trade, working in his father's newspaper, The Chicopee Journal, while he attended high school in Chicopee, Massachusetts.

After his high school education, at the age of 19, Browne enlisted in the 46th Regiment of Infantry, Massachusetts Volunteers, Company D, and was mustered into service on September 25, 1862. He was appointed as 1st Corporal. During his volunteer service, he participated in the Goldsborough Expedition, 2nd Trent Road reconnaissance (March 13, 1863), was part of the garrison of troops sent to Plymouth (April 1863), on the Roanoke River, Gum Swamp, and the Maryland Campaign. He mustered out on July 29, 1863. Thirty-two men died of illness or accident, during their service, one soldier died as a direct consequence of battle.

=== Career ===
After his military service, he worked in a law office in Rochester, New York then left to take a law course at the University of Michigan in 1866, however he left in early 1867, returning to Rochester, where he met and married Susan Seaman Brooks on June 26, 1867. They moved to Chicago, where he was determined to pursue a literary career.

Browne edited the Lakeside Monthly (Chicago) (1869–74), The Alliance (1878–79), and The Dial (1880–1913), a semimonthly literary review. Browne purchased The Dial, however he found Chicago to be somewhat inhospitable to significant intellectual ventures and sacrificed much of his own wealth in the pursuit of The Dial’s success. In May 1880, the first issue of The Dial was released under the publishing firm, Jansen, McClurg & Company, with Browne serving in the position as literary advisor. In contrast to the first incarnations of The Dial, Browne’s endeavor was criticized for its apolitical and conservative content.

Browne also attempted to establish an upscale bookstore, Browne’s Bookstore, in the Fine Arts Building. The store was designed by Frank Lloyd Wright. However, he failed to attract consistent patronage, and closed the store after five years.

=== Personal and literary activities ===
Over the years, he had become close friends with John Muir, John Burroughs, Walt Whitman, and other notable figures. Browne was one of the founders and later, an honorary member of the Chicago Literary Club, the Caxton Club, and The Twilight Club of Pasadena (California). He served as the Chairman of Committee on Congress at the World's Congress Auxiliary of the Columbian Exhibition, in the summer of 1893.

=== Death ===
Browne died at age 69 in Santa Barbara, California.

== Works ==
Browne authored two books as listed below.

- The life of Abraham Lincoln, Thompson Publishing Company, 1886.

Revised versions of the original have been published as well.

- Volunteer Grain, Way & Williams, 1895.

Browne also collected and edited four books of poetry as listed below.

- Golden Poems, by British and American authors, Jansen, McClurg & Company, 1882.
- The Golden Treasury of Poetry and Prose, Thompson, 1883.
- Bugle echoes: A collection of the poetry of the Civil War, Northern and Southern, A. McClurg, 1916.
- Laurel Crowned, a series of standard poetry.
