= Simenon (disambiguation) =

Georges Simenon (1903–1989) was a Belgian author.

Simenon may also refer to:

- Marc Simenon (1939–1999), Belgian filmwriter, son of Georges Simenon
- Tim Simenon, English musician
- Paul Simonon (note spelling; born 1955), English musician
