= Sarah Pritchard =

Sarah Pritchard may refer to:

- Malinda Blalock, female soldier during the American Civil War, also known as Sarah Pritchard
- Sarah M. Pritchard, American academic librarian

== See also ==
- Sara B. Pritchard, American historian of technology and environmental historian
