= By the Blood of Others =

- Directed by: Marc Simenon
- Screenplay by: Jean Max
- Story by: Jean Max
- Cinematography: René Verzier
- Edited by: Étiennette Muse
- Music by: Francis Lai
- Production companies: Kangourou Films; Les Films La Boétie; Verona Produzione; Cinévidéo
- Release dates: March 8, 1974 (Canada); April 10, 1974 (France); May 16, 1974 (Italy)
- Countries: France; Italy; Canada
- Budget: 3.8 million francs

By the Blood of Others (French: Par le sang des autres) is a film directed by Marc Simenon.

== Cast ==
- Yves Beneyton as psychopath
- Francis Blanche as doctor
- Bernard Blier as Gaéton Duteil
- Robert Castel as Pierre
- Mylène Demongeot as Juliette, the prostitute
- Monita Derrieux as Amélie, the post office employee
- Denise Filiatrault Geneviève Barthèlémy
- Jacques Godin as Francis Duteil
- Nathalie Guérin as Caroline Barthélémy
- Georges Géret as commissioner

== Production ==
By the Blood of Others's screenplay is credited to Jean Max and usually identified as the actor Jean Max who died in 1970. His only other film credit as a writer was for television for Claude Chabrol. Roberto Curti and Frank Lafond, the authors of French Thrillers of the 1970s: Volume I, Crime Films (2026), said it was unlikely to be the same person as the actor, as Mylène Farmer, who co-produced By the Blood of Others and said in her memoirs she and her husband had lost contact with the writer after the film's production. Farmer's production company had purchased the script and renamed it Le Poing dans la gueule (lit. 'The Fist in the Mug') and then renamed it Le Sang des autres (lit. 'The Blood of the Others') by September.

By the Blood of Others is a French, Italian and Canadian international co-production. It was produced by the Chesnay based Kangourou Films, the Paris-based Les Films La Boétie, the Rome-based Verona Produzione and Montreal's Cinévidéo. The film remained a majority French production at 60%, with its budget totalling to 3.8 million francs.

Initially, Robert Hossein was considered for the role that was eventually assigned to Yves Beneyton.

== Release ==
By the Blood of Others was released in Canada on March 8, 1974. It was first banned in France for anyone under the age of 16, and was later released in the country on April 10, 1974. It attracted only 182,858 spectators in France. Months after its release in Paris, it was released in the provinces under the title Pour une poignée de salauds (lit. 'For a Fistful of Bastards').

It was released in Italy as Ultimatum alla polizia on May 16, 1974. In New York, it was released under the title By the Blood of Others.

== Reception ==
Curti and Lafond said the French press did not care much for the film, with Michel Grisolia stating the film "easily shatter[ed] the safeguards of gemagogic inteptitute"

Curti and Lafond said it received unanimously negative reviews on its release in New York.
