= Fantômas (1964 film) =

- Theatrical poster
- Directed by: André Hunebelle
- Written by: Pierre Souvestre (novels); Marcel Allain (novels); Jean Halain (screenplay); Pierre Foucaud (screenplay)
- Produced by: Paul Cadéac (delegate producer); Cyril Grize (producer); Alain Poiré (delegate producer)
- Starring: Jean Marais; Louis de Funès; Mylène Demongeot
- Cinematography: Marcel Grignon
- Edited by: Jean Feyte
- Music by: Michel Magne
- Production company: Gaumont
- Distributed by: Gaumont Distribution
- Release date: 4 November 1964 (France)
- Running time: 105 minutes
- Country: France
- Language: French
- Box office: $33.7 million

Fantômas (French pronunciation: [fɑ̃tomas]) is a 1964 French comedy film starring Jean Marais as the archvillain Fantômas opposite Louis de Funès as the earnest but outclassed commissaire Paul Juve. In the film Juve teams up with journalist Fandor, also played by Marais, trying to catch Fantômas but never quite succeeding. It was France's answer, in 1964, to the James Bond phenomenon that swept the world at around the same time. It is the first film of a trilogy, and Fantômas became extremely successful in Europe, the Soviet Union, Japan, and the United States. Mylène Demongeot plays "Hélène Gurn", the girlfriend of "Jérôme Fandor", Fantômas' archenemy. The general tone of the films is more light-hearted than the original Fantômas novels. Commissaire Juve, as played by Louis de Funès, becomes a comedic character, much unlike his literary counterpart.

== Plot ==
Fantômas is a man of many disguises. He uses maquillage as a weapon. He can impersonate anyone using an array of masks and can create endless confusion by constantly changing his appearance. In the first episode of the series he is unhappy with Fandor, because of a fictitious interview the journalist wrote about him. He takes his revenge by abducting Fandor and threatening to kill him. He then uses his formidable makeup skills to commit a spectacular crime while disguised like Fandor. When commissaire Juve joins the chase, chameleon-like Fantômas promptly commits a crime wearing a mask looking like Juve. In the end Fandor, Juve and Fandor's girlfriend Hélène are all on the master criminal's trail, all to no avail as the man of a thousand masks finally manages to escape.

== Cast ==
Actor	Character
Jean Marais	Fantômas / Fandor
Louis de Funès	Commissaire Juve
Mylène Demongeot	Hélène Gurn
Jacques Dynam	Michel Bertrand
Marie-Hélène Arnaud	Lady Beltham

== Release ==
Fantômas was released in France on 4 November 1964 and in the United States on 5 April 1966.

== Reception ==
Fantômas was the fifth most popular film at the French box office in 1964 and it had admissions of 4,492,419.

== The Fantômas trilogy ==
Title	Release date
Fantômas	4 November 1964
Fantômas se déchaîne	8 December 1965
Fantômas contre Scotland Yard	16 March 1967
