= The Mushroom (1970 film) =

- Directed by: Marc Simenon
- Written by: Alphonse Boudard; Marc Simenon
- Starring: Mylène Demongeot; Alida Valli
- Cinematography: Marcel Combes
- Music by: Zoo
- Release date: 1970
- Language: French

The Mushroom (French: Le champignon, Italian: L'assassino colpisce all'alba, also known as The Murderer Strikes at Dawn, The Killer Strikes at Dawn and L’assassin frappe à l’aube) is a 1970 French-Italian crime film written and directed by Marc Simenon.

== Plot ==
A physician, growing distant from his workaholic wife, befriends an artist. After a night spent drinking and taking hallucinogenic mushroom with the artist, the physician discovers that his wife had died, and begins to question what took place.

== Cast ==
- Mylène Demongeot as Anne Calder
- Alida Valli as Linda Benson
- Jean-Claude Bouillon as Éric Calder
- Catherine Allégret as Jeannette
- Philippe Monnet as Gaëtan
- Jean Claudio as Kogan
- Georges Géret as Kurt
- François Simon as Le Juge
