= The Unvanquished (film) =

L'Insoumis
- Film poster
- Directed by: Alain Cavalier
- Written by: Jean Cau; Alain Cavalier
- Produced by: Alain Delon (uncredited); Georges Beaume
- Starring: Alain Delon; Lea Massari; Georges Géret
- Cinematography: Claude Renoir
- Music by: Georges Delerue
- Production companies: Delbeau Prod Cipra (Paris); PCM (Rome)
- Distributed by: Metro-Goldwyn-Mayer
- Release date: 25 September 1964 (France)
- Running time: 114 minutes
- Countries: France; Italy
- Language: French
- Box office: 711,339 admissions (France)

The Unvanquished (French: L'Insoumis; Italian: Il ribelle di Algeri; also known as Have I the Right to Kill?) is a 1964 film noir directed by Alain Cavalier and starring Alain Delon opposite Lea Massari.

The film's background is the Algerian War and Alain Delon plays Thomas Vlassenroot, a deserter of the French Foreign Legion in Algeria during the 1961 uprising. When a former lieutenant who now works for the OAS proposes to him to kidnap lawyer Dominique Servet (played by Massari), Thomas agrees. Caught giving Dominique water, Thomas goes on the run after a shoot out with his OAS colleagues, who subsequently begin to hunt them down.

The film was not a completely happy experience for Alain Delon. He sustained physical injuries while filming and the reception of the picture by the French public was not good. The censors insisted on a number of cuts which compromised the artistic integrity of the film.

== Synopsis ==
Thomas Vlassenroot, a citizen of Luxembourg, after his divorce, decides to enlist in the French Foreign Legion. He is posted to Algeria, where the film opens with him trying in vain to save a wounded comrade while under fire from the rebels. Thomas deserts to join the OAS on the order of Lieutenant Fraser (Georges Géret).

After the 1961 putsch, a disillusioned Thomas wants to return home but agrees to take part in a plan to kidnap lawyer Dominique Servet in return for enough money to enable him to pay smugglers who can ferry him to France.

Dominique Servet is in Algiers working for the prosecution on a case involving important Europeans, her Algerian witnesses making her a target of the OAS. While guarding Dominique, Thomas' conscience is aroused by Dominique's plight, and he is attracted to her—she implores him to release her, but instead he agrees to give her water—the other guard, Amerio (a Pied-Noir) warns him at gunpoint not to get soft. Thomas is also armed, and they end up shooting at each other. Amerio is killed, while Thomas is wounded. Dominique pays Thomas the smuggling fee in exchange for freeing her and another prisoner. Thomas locks up Fraser when he comes to check on them, and is warned that the OAS will never stop hunting Thomas if he goes through with this—Amerio's death can be forgiven, but not the betrayal of releasing the prisoners. He says Thomas would be better off killing him—but Thomas refuses to kill Fraser—to him, that would be murder. He puts water in the cell, and tells his girlfriend Maria (whose devotion he can only partly return) to go and release Fraser once he's safely out of Algeria.

Arriving in France, Thomas takes the train back to Luxembourg but during a stop in Lyon he disembarks, taking the chance that Dominique will provide help—and wanting to see her again. Thomas finds Dominique at home and a doctor is called to help get Thomas into a hospital under a fake name once she learns how serious his injuries are.

She takes him to a room he can hide out in while waiting, and in spite of her loyalty to her husband, she ends up going to bed with him there. Fraser, who had been watching Dominique's house, follows them to the room with an associate. He intends to kill them both, but takes too long explaining to Thomas that his betrayal of the movement was unnecessary; he would have kept his word about not punishing Thomas for the death of Amerio. Fraser can't understand the real reasons Thomas did what he did, anymore than he understood why Fraser would risk his life for a dying man. Thomas asks for a moment to adjust his bandages then shoots the other OAS man with a gun he had concealed under the bedclothes—again leaving Fraser alive, because he can't kill in cold blood.

Dominique drives him in her Citroën DS. On the way back to his home they go through roadblocks, get shot at by the police, and finally with the help of Dominique's understanding husband he finally crosses the border to Luxembourg and reaches his mother's bee farm. He is increasingly aware that his untreated wound will be fatal, but is obsessed with getting back before he dies.

He enters his home and finds his little girl sitting at the table. She is frightened by what and who she sees before her, and runs away. He collapses on the floor and dies while passing his hand over his face as if to close his eyes. Dominique still waiting outside the fence cries out his name. The film closes on a silent black screen with Thomas Vlassenroot's name and dates of birth and death, 1933–1961.

== Cast ==
- Alain Delon as Thomas Vlassenroot
- Lea Massari as Dominique Servet
- Georges Géret as Lieutenant Fraser
- Maurice Garrel as Pierre Servet
- Robert Castel as Amerio
- Viviane Attia as Maria
- Robert Bazil as Maria's father
- Paul Pavel as Félicien

== Production ==
The film was made for Alain Delon's own company. It was distributed by MGM, for whom Delon had also made Any Number Can Win and Joy House. He had a five-picture deal with the studio and would go on to make Once a Thief and The Yellow Rolls-Royce for them.

== In popular culture ==
A film still featuring Delon was used by the English rock band The Smiths for the cover of their album The Queen Is Dead.

== Books ==
- Alain Delon, l'insoumis (1957–1970) by Henry-Jean Servat
