= Méfiez-vous, mesdames =

1963 film

Méfiez-vous, mesdames!
- Theatrical poster
- Directed by: André Hunebelle
- Written by: Pierre Foucaud; Jean Halain
- Produced by: Paul Cadéac; Alain Poiré
- Cinematography: Raymond Lemoigne
- Edited by: Jean Feyte
- Music by: Michel Magne
- Production companies: Cineriz; P.A.C. Société Nouvelle des Établissements Gaumont (SNEG); Zebra Films
- Distributed by: Gaumont Distribution
- Release date: 3 October 1963
- Running time: 81 minutes
- Countries: France; Italy
- Language: French
- Box office: $8.9 million

Méfiez-vous, mesdames! (English title: Be Careful, Ladies!) is a 1963 French comedy film directed by André Hunebelle. The screenplay was written by Pierre Foucaud and Jean Halain, based on a novel by Ange Bastiani. It tells the story of a former lawyer who discovers a woman's murder plot.

== Cast ==
- Michèle Morgan as Gisèle Duparc
- Danielle Darrieux as Hedwige
- Sandra Milo as Henriette
- Paul Meurisse as Charles Rouvier
- Martine Sarcey as Colette de Marval
- Yves Rénier as Christian
- Marcel Pérès as Le gardien de prison
- Léon Zitrone as Himself

== See also ==
- Servez-vous, mesdames
