= Jean Claudio =

French actor (1927–1992)

- Born: Claude Daniel Robert Martin; 28 March 1927; Neuilly-sur-Seine, Hauts-de-Seine, France
- Died: 11 January 1992 (aged 64); Saint-Cloud, Hauts-de-Seine, France
- Occupation: Actor
- Years active: 1938-1990

Jean Claudio (28 March 1927 – 11 January 1992) was a French actor.

== Biography ==
Born Claude Daniel Robert Martin, he began his acting career in the cinema at the age of ten, playing the role of the Tsarevich, son of Tsar Nicolas II in The Imperial Tragedy.

In 1938, at the age of eleven, he played Mathieu Sorgue in Les Disparus de Saint-Agil by Christian-Jaque. He entered the Paris Conservatory, where, at fourteen, he was given the role of Chérubin in Le Mariage de Figaro. He has since had an international career, particularly in the United States.

He wrote a collection of poems, Les faux joies (published in 1950), as well as several novels: The Hot Season, Les Torts Reciprocals, Monsieur Damoclès and L'inconnu de Genève.

== Selected filmography ==
- Rasputin (1938) - Le tsarevitch
- The Postmaster's Daughter (1938) - Boy
- Boys' School (1938) - Mathieu Sorgue
- Crossroads (1938) - Paul de Vétheuil
- The Phantom Carriage (1939) - Un enfant
- L'Enfer des anges (1941) - Le jeune Lucien
- Andorra ou les Hommes d'airain (1942) - Angelo
- The Heart of a Nation (1943) - Félix enfant
- Les Cadets de l'océan (1945) - Michel
- Moulin Rouge (1952) - Drunken Reveller (uncredited)
- Marie Antoinette Queen of France (1956) - Fouquier-Tinville
- Elena and Her Men (1956) - Lionel Villaret
- Sylviane de mes nuits (1957) - Jean
- Dangerous Exile (1957) - DeCastres, Philippe's Paris Comrade
- Pourquoi viens-tu si tard? (1959) - Le grand-duc russe
- Nathalie, agent secret (1959)
- Picnic on the Grass (1959) - Rousseau
- Charge of the Black Lancers (1962) - Sergio Di Tula
- Messalina vs. the Son of Hercules (1964) - Gaio Silio
- The Beauty Jungle (1964) - Armand
- Crimine a due (1964) - Davide Lugani
- The Magnificent Cuckold (1964) - The Man at the Swimming Pool (uncredited)
- Gentlemen of the Night (1964)
- Darling (1965) - Raoul Maxim
- Witness Out of Hell (1966) - Charlos Bianchi
- Espions à l'affût (1966) - Max Savelan
- Triple Cross (1966) - Sergeant Thomas
- Moto Shel Yehudi (1969) - Kassik
- Una storia d'amore (1970) - Marco
- The Mushroom (1970) - L'inspecteur Kogan
- Children of Mata Hari (1970) - Fédor 'La Filature'
- Le fou (1970) - L'agent d'affaires
- Sentivano uno strano, eccitante, pericoloso puzzo di dollari (1973)
- A Thousand Billion Dollars (1982) - Vittorio Orta
