= Robert Castel (actor) =

French actor (1933–2020)

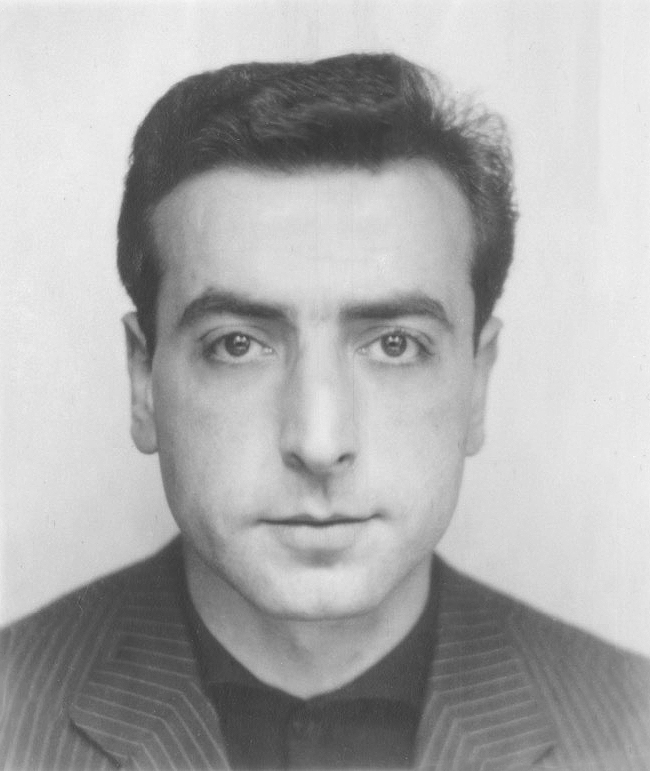
- Born: 21 May 1933; Bab El Oued, French Algeria
- Died: 5 December 2020 (aged 87); Paris, France
- Burial place: Cimetière parisien de Pantin
- Occupation: Actor

Robert Castel (21 May 1933 – 5 December 2020) was a French actor.

== Biography ==
Castel was born in Bab El Oued on 21 May 1933. He was the son of Lili Labassi, a singer-songwriter of Chaabi music. He started his career as a musician, accompanying his father in Franco-Arabic songs. He began his acting career in the troupe of the Centre régional d'art dramatique in Algiers. He played the role of Robert in the play on the people of the Pied-Noir, titled La Famille Hernandez. He began his film career at the age of 24 with Les Amants de demain, directed by Marcel Blistène and Witness in the City, directed by Édouard Molinaro. He continued his acting career for the remainder of the 20th Century, ending his career with the 2017 documentary Les Magnifiques, which featured Charley Marouani, Enrico Macias, and Philippe Clair. The documentary covered pop culture in France from the 1960s to the 1980s.

Castel was the widower of Pied-Noir actress Lucette Sahuquet, who died in 1987. The couple appeared on Les Grosses Têtes, broadcast on RTL, and Les Jeux de 20 heures, broadcast on France Régions 3. Robert Castel died in the Hôpital de la Pitié-Salpêtrière in Paris on 5 December 2020 following a long illness. He was buried on 9 December at the Cimitière parisien de Pantin.

== Filmography ==
=== Cinema ===
- Port du désir (1955)
- Les Amants de demain (1957)
- Witness in the City (1959)
- The Unvanquished (1964)
- An Idiot in Paris (1967)
- Les Gros Malins (1969)
- Trois hommes sur un cheval (1969)
- La Honte de la famille (1969)
- L'homme orchestre (1970)
- La Ville bidon (1971)
- Il était une fois un flic (1971)
- The Tall Blond Man with One Black Shoe (1972)
- Elle court, elle court la banlieu (1973)
- Le Complot (1973)
- Two Men in Town (1973)
- Les Permis de conduire (1973)
- By the Blood of Others (1974)
- Le Plumard en folie (1974)
- Vos gueules, les mouettes ! (1974)
- Par ici la monnaie (1974)
- The Common Man (1975)
- C'est dur pour tout le monde (1975)
- Attention les yeux ! (1976)
- Les Grands Moyens (1976)
- Arrête ton char... bidasse ! (1977)
- Vas-y maman (1978)
- Je suis timide mais je me soigne (1978)
- Les Borsalini (1979)
- Mais qu'est-ce que j'ai fait au bon Dieu pour avoir une femme qui boit dans les cafés avec les hommes ? (1980)
- Sacrés gendarmes (1980)
- Le bahut va craquer (1980)
- Hassan Taxi (1982)
- Les P'tites Têtes (1982)
- Le Braconnier de Dieu (1983)
- Sandy (1983)
- C'est facile et ça peut rapporter... 20 ans (1983)
- Les Marchands de sable (2000)
- Trois zéros (2002)
- Iznogoud (2005)
- Du jour au lendemain (2006)
- Un matin d'espérance (2009)
- Teenagers (2011)
- El Gusto (2012)
- The Jews (2016)

== Decorations ==
- Knight of the Legion of Honour (2011)
