= The Mysteries of Paris (1962 film) =

- Directed by: André Hunebelle
- Written by: Diego Fabbri; Pierre Foucaud
- Produced by: André Hunebelle
- Starring: Jean Marais
- Cinematography: Marcel Grignon; Jean Tournier
- Edited by: Jean Feyte
- Music by: Jean Marion
- Distributed by: Les Films Océanic
- Release date: 2 October 1962 (France)
- Running time: 110 minutes
- Countries: France, Italy
- Language: French
- Box office: 3,147,172 admissions (France)

The Mysteries of Paris (French: Les Mystères de Paris) is a French-Italian film from 1962, set in Paris. It was directed by André Hunebelle, written by Diego Fabbri and Pierre Foucaud, starring Jean Marais. The scenario was written on the basis of the novel Les Mystères de Paris. It has several precursors including The Mysteries of Paris (1912), The Mysteries of Paris (1935).

== Cast ==
- Jean Marais as Rodolphe de Sambreuil, lover of Irène
- Raymond Pellegrin as Baron de Lansignac, the enemy of Rodolphe
- Jill Haworth as Marie Godin
- Dany Robin as Irène
- Pierre Mondy as Chourineur
- Georges Chamarat as Jérôme Foulon
- Noël Roquevert as Mr. Pipelet, the concierge
- Jean Le Poulain as The Teacher
- Renée Gardès as the Owl
- Alain Decock as the young person Fanfan Morel
- Robert Dalban as the boss of the inn of the Destructives
- Paulette Dubost as Mrs Pipelet, the concierge
- Benoîte Lab as Louise Morel, the woman of the suit
- Gabriel Gobin as Mr. Morel, the suit
- Madeleine Barbulée as Mrs Godin
- Maria Meriko as Mrs Georges
- Charles Bouillaud as Mr. Godin
- Raoul Billerey as Amédée
- Guy Delorme as policeman
- Jacques Sablon

== See also ==
- List of highest-grossing films in the Soviet Union
