= Gold for the Caesars =

- Screenplay by: Arnold Perl; Sabatino Ciuffini; Millard Lampell
- Based on: Gold for the Caesars by Florence A. Sward
- Produced by: Joseph Fryd; Attilio Riccio; Bernard Borderie
- Starring: Jeffrey Hunter; Mylène Demongeot; Ron Randell; Massimo Girotti
- Cinematography: Raffaele Masciocchi
- Edited by: Franco Fraticelli
- Music by: Franco Mannino
- Production companies: Adelphia Compagnia Cinematografica; Compagnie Industrielle et Commerciale Cinématographique; Films Borderie
- Distributed by: Metro-Goldwyn-Mayer
- Release date: 9 March 1963 (Italy)
- Running time: 100 minutes
- Countries: Italy; France

Gold for the Caesars (Italian: Oro per i Cesari) is a 1963 peplum film starring Jeffrey Hunter and Mylène Demongeot. Originally planned as an American production, the film later became an Italian-French international co-production after the poor box office return of King of Kings. It was shot in Italy in 1962. The film is credited to Andre de Toth in the United States and both de Toth and Sabatino Ciuffini in Italy. Second unit director Riccardo Freda has claimed to have shot the entire film, while De Toth biographies make little input regarding his work on the film. Actress Mylène Demongeot has also backed up that Freda had taken charge on the films set.

== Plot/Synopsis ==
In 96A.D., aspiring Caesars finance their political ascent and power by having slaves mine for large quantities of gold near Cartago Nova (New Carthage - Cartagena) in Hispania (Spain). There is a massacre involving Spanish Celts and also a truce for a gold-searching expedition.

Lacer is an architect slave who overseas a Roman mine run by cruel centurion Rufu. Lacer has been promised his freedom if he helps finish the mine. He falls in love with Penelope, mistress of the pro consul Maximus.

== Cast ==
- Jeffrey Hunter as Lacer
- Mylène Demongeot as Penelope
- Ron Randell as Centurion Rufus
- Massimo Girotti as Pro-consul Caius Cornelius Maximus
- Giulio Bosetti as Scipio
- Ettore Manni as Luna the Celt
- Georges Lycan as Malendi the Celt
- Furio Meniconi as Dax the Gaul

== Production ==
Gold for the Caesars was an Italian-French peplum film produced by Joseph Fryd, Bernard Borderie and Freda's friend Attilio Riccio. It featured Jeffrey Hunter and Ron Randell from King of Kings.

The film was based on the 1961 Florence A. Seward novel of the same name.

The film was originally intended to be made by MGM as early as 1961, but was put off after the box-office disappointment of King of Kings (1961).

Fryd took over the production to make it a lower budget production in Europe. This also had the film's story drastically changed from the novel with a greater focus on the action than characterisation.

The film was shot near Terni in 1962. Filming commenced September 1962.

Dahlia Lavi was originally announced as the female lead.

André De Toth is credited as the director in the American version of the film. The Italian version of the film credits Sabatino Ciuffini as the director, while De Toth is credited as the "supervising director". This would make the film Ciuffini's only directorial role.

Second unit director Riccardo Freda, who is officially credited as a second unit director, stated that "I claim the whole film as mine from start to finish. The producers put De Toth aside on the second day of shooting. André de Toth did not shoot anything."

The film was one of several De Toth made in Italy, others including Morgan the Pirate and The Moguls. De Toth described his films in Italy as "a vacation, taking a breather between climbing new peaks. Unfortunately, I climbed the wrong one, and when I skied down one of the Swiss Alps, I broke my neck. And that wasn't on the schedule," which only had De Toth return to directing in 1968.

In his memoirs, De Toth mentions the film in passing in De Toth on De Toth. He said "I loved Italy, I loved them [the actors in his films] and the dolce vita. I did what I could, I was up front, I didn’t hoodwink them or myself. Those films served them and were good for me as an experiment."

The film's female lead Mylène Demongeot wrote in her own autobiography Tiroirs secrets stated that "De Toth seemed more interested in playing golf than in movies. He willingly left free ground to Riccardo Freda, who shot very spectacular scenes."

Ron Randell called the film "sheer murder. It was a miracle no one was killed." He said Ricardo Freda was "a killer - but a great action director. He seemingly doesn't care if you're stepped on by a horse."

== Release ==
Gold for the Caesars was released in Italy on March 9, 1963. It was later released in the United States as Gold for the Caesars in June 1964 where it was distributed by MGM. The film was released on DVD by Warner Archives on-demand series.

== Reception ==
In a contemporary review, "Dale." of Variety called the film "an acceptable piece of product that may satisfy the most undemanding filmgoers"

A review in the Monthly Film Bulletin noted the film had a "ragged" and "unconvincing" storyline concluding that "even if all its virtues are negative, the film is agreeable enough to watch and its swift development prevents it from becoming too tedious."
