= Kick, Raoul, la moto, les jeunes et les autres =

Kick, Raoul, la moto, les jeunes et les autres is a 1980 French television series. It premiered on May 15, 1980, on TF1 and 6 episodes lasting 52 minutes each were broadcast. It was filmed in villages of the Ardèche including Alba-la-Romaine, Saint Pons, and Saint Jean Le Centenier. The series was directed by Marc Simenon and script written by Louis Rognoni and Daniel Goldenberg.

== Cast ==
- Frédéric de Pasquale : Raoul
- Eric Do : Roger
- Catherine Leprince : Christine
- Gérard Loussine : Lucien
- Alain Desplanques : Jean-François
- Louis-Michel Colla : Vincent
- Mehdi El Glaoui : Philippe
- Frédéric Witta : Bernard
- Charlotte Wallior : Anne
- Mario D'Alba : Johny Speed
- Évelyne Dandry : Martine
- Mylène Demongeot : Martine #2
- Paul Préboist : Jules
- Maurice Chevit : Roulède
- Van Doude : Guilbeau
- Michel Bardinet : Gravier
- Philippe Moreau : Anglade
- Jacques Verlier : Perrin
- Paul Rieger : Chaille
- Hong Maï Thomas : Mme Chaille
- Pierre Bojic : Le médecin
- Bernard Charlan : René

== Episodes ==
1. Johnny Speed
2. Le Moto Club
3. Le Hold-up
4. L’Enduro
5. Le Champion
6. Martine
