= Tropical Fantasy (album) =

Studio album by Michel Magne
- Released: 1962
- Genre: Exotica
- Label: Bel Air (France), Columbia (United States)

Tropical Fantasy is a 1962 album by French composer Michel Magne, credited to "Michel Magne et son grand orchestre." It was released in France by Bel Air records (with a cover photo from Three Lions) and in the United States, with two fewer tracks, by Columbia Records (with cover art by Marilyn Bass). It was reissued digitally in 2012.

The album was recorded at Barclay-Hoche Studios.

== Background ==
Although Magne is known primarily as a film composer, Tropical Fantasy is not his first, or his only, album of original music. In 1956, Magne released Musique pour films, which, despite the title, consisted entirely of music not written for films. And in 1959, "Michel Magne et son grand orchestre à cordes" released Paris, an easy listening album of music divided into four musical eras (1900, 1925, 1935, and 1955). In the same year, showing himself to be a pioneer of the genre, he released an album of electronic music, Musique tachiste.

In 1962, the year Tropical Fantasy was released, Magne was nominated for an Academy Award for Best Original Score, for his score for the Gene Kelly-Jackie Gleason film Gigot.

== Reception ==
Professional ratings
Review scores
Source	Rating
Jason Ankeny, AllMusic	4.5/5 stars
Billboard	4/4 stars

In a 4.5-star review for AllMusic, Jason Ankeny called it "one of the most unique and daring records in the exotica canon." Billboard said it had "more gusto" than Martin Denny, and also noted the stereo effects, writing that the album "may appeal to new stereo fans."

Geoff Alexander, in his 2019 book America Goes Hawaiian, wrote that Magne "included elements of musique concrète…. and he surprisingly created a seamless pastiche that may never be equalled, in terms of its orchestral complexity."

Space Age Pop Music said that "Magne manages to cram together into one album virtually all there is to love about space age pop music."

== Track listing ==
=== French version ===
Side A
No.	Title	Writer(s)	Length
1.	"Amapola"	Joseph Lacalle	2:02
2.	"Congo"	Michel Magne	2:09
3.	"Baia"	Ary Barroso	3:13
4.	"Tabou"	Margarita Lecuona	2:25
5.	"Peanut Vendor"	Moisés Simons	1:27
6.	"Acércate Más"	Jacques Larue, Osvaldo Farrés	2:16
7.	"Copacabana"	Alberto Ribeiro, João De Barro	1:50
8.	"Brazil"	Ary Barroso, Jacques Larue	2:32
Total length:			17:54

Side B
No.	Title	Writer(s)	Length
1.	"Two Silhouettes"	Charles Wolcott, Ray Gilbert	2:44
2.	"Sahara"	Michel Magne	2:46
3.	"Solamente Una Vez"	Agustin Lara	1:58
4.	"Quizás, Quizás, Quizás"	Jacques Larue, Osvaldo Farrés	2:09
5.	"Bésame Mucho"	Consuelo Velazquez	2:07
6.	"Perfidia"	Alberto Domínguez	2:12
7.	"El Cumbachero"	Rafael Hernández	1:25
8.	"Tropical"	Morton Gould	2:20
Total length:			17:41

=== US version ===
Side A
No.	Title	Writer(s)	Length
1.	"Bahia"	Ary Barroso	3:13
2.	"Sahara"	Michel Magne	2:46
3.	"Brazil"	Ary Barroso, Jacques Larue	2:32
4.	"Perfidia"	Alberto Domínguez	2:12
5.	"The Peanut Vendor"	Moisés Simons	1:27
6.	"Come Closer to Me"	Jacques Larue, Osvaldo Farrés	2:16
7.	"Two Silhouettes"	Charles Wolcott, Ray Gilbert	2:44
Total length:			17:43

Side B
No.	Title	Writer(s)	Length
1.	"Congo"	Michel Magne	2:09
2.	"Bésame Mucho"	Consuelo Velazquez	2:07
3.	"Tropical"	Morton Gould	2:20
4.	"Tabu"	Margarita Lecuona	2:25
5.	"El Cumbachero"	Rafael Hernández	1:25
6.	"You Belong to My Heart"	Agustin Lara	1:58
7.	"Perhaps, Perhaps, Perhaps"	Jacques Larue, Osvaldo Farrés	2:09
Total length:			15:03
