= Pierre Foucaud =

French writer and director

- Born: 19 March 1908; Bordeaux, Gironde, France
- Died: 5 August 1976 (aged 68); Saint-Nazaire-sur-Charente, Charente-Maritime, France
- Occupations: Writer, Director
- Years active: 1951–1968 (film)

Pierre Foucaud (1908–1976) was a French screenwriter and film director. He wrote a number of screenplays for the director André Hunebelle.

== Selected filmography ==
- Quay of Blondes (1954)
- Mademoiselle Strip-tease (Striptease de Paris) (1957)
- Le Bossu (1959)
- Captain Blood (1960)
- The Miracle of the Wolves (1961)
- The Mysteries of Paris (1962)
- Méfiez-vous, mesdames (1963)
- OSS 117 Is Unleashed (1963)
- Shadow of Evil (1964)
- Fantômas contre Scotland Yard (1964)
- Fantômas (1964)
- Fantômas se déchaîne (1965)
- OSS 117 Mission for a Killer (1965)
- Atout cœur à Tokyo pour OSS 117 (1966)
- OSS 117 – Double Agent (1968)

== Bibliography ==
- Rège, Philippe. Encyclopedia of French Film Directors, Volume 1. Scarecrow Press, 2009.
