= Fantômas contre Scotland Yard =

- Film poster
- Directed by: André Hunebelle
- Written by: Pierre Souvestre (novels); Marcel Allain (novels); Jean Halain (adaptation, screenplay and dialogue); Pierre Foucaud (adaptation)
- Produced by: Paul Cadéac; Alain Poiré
- Starring: Jean Marais; Louis de Funès; Mylène Demongeot
- Cinematography: Marcel Grignon; Vladimir Ivanov
- Edited by: Pierre Gillette
- Music by: Michel Magne
- Production company: Gaumont
- Distributed by: Gaumont Distribution
- Release date: 16 March 1967
- Running time: 96 minutes
- Country: France
- Language: French
- Box office: $26.7 million

Fantômas contre Scotland Yard (French pronunciation: [fɑ̃tomas kɔ̃tʁ skɔtland jaʁd], "Fantomas Against Scotland Yard") is the final installment of a trilogy of films starring Jean Marais as the archvillain Fantômas opposite Louis de Funès as the earnest but outclassed commissaire Juve and the journalist Fandor, also played by Marais. The trilogy was France's humorous answer, starting in 1964, to the James Bond phenomenon that swept the world at around the same time. The Fantômas films became extremely successful in Europe and USSR, and they also found success in the United States and Japan.

== Plot ==
In the third and final film of the trilogy, Fantômas imposes a head tax on the rich, threatening to kill those who do not comply. Journalist Fandor and commissaire Juve are invited to Scotland by Lord McRashley (played by Jean-Roger Caussimon). Lord McRashley, one of Fantômas' potential victims, uses his castle as the headquarters to set up a trap for the menace called Fantômas.

== Cast ==
| Actor | Character |
|---|---|
| Jean Marais | Fantômas / Fandor |
| Louis de Funès | Commissioner Juve |
| Mylène Demongeot | Hélène Gurn |
| Jean-Roger Caussimon | Lord McRashley |

== Filming locations ==
The film was shot in France, England and Scotland. A prominent filming location in France was the Château de Roquetaillade; in the film it is Lord McRashley's Scottish castle.

== Release ==
Fantômas contre Scotland Yard premiered in France on 16 March 1967 and had admissions in France of 3,557,971.

== The Fantômas trilogy ==
| Title | Release date |
|---|---|
| Fantômas | 4 November 1964 |
| Fantômas se déchaîne | 8 December 1965 |
| Fantômas contre Scotland Yard | 16 March 1967 |

== Cancelled sequel ==
A fourth film titled Fantômas à Moscou (Fantômas in Moscow) was planned, but Jean Marais and Louis de Funès did not get on and refused to work together again. As a result, the project never got off the ground. According to the script, Fandor was Fantomas' son.
