= Kenneth Nebenzahl =

- Born: 1927
- Died: 2020 (aged 92–93)
- Occupation: seller of antiquarian books and maps, author

Kenneth Nebenzahl (September 16, 1927 – January 29, 2020) was an internationally known antiquarian book- and mapseller, author, and supporter and benefactor of the field of the history of cartography.

== Career ==
After serving in the U.S. Marines during World War II Nebenzahl attended Columbia University and then worked as a salesman for the Paul Masson Winery in Ohio and New Orleans. He married Jocelyn (Jossy) Spitz in 1953.

The couple moved to Chicago and established ‘Kenneth Nebenzahl, Inc.' as an antiquarian book company specializing in rare maps. His catalogs were titled Compass for Map Collectors and The Print Collector.

He also worked with libraries to develop map collections, notably the Newberry Library in Chicago.

Nebenzahl served on the boards of the Newberry Library, the University of Chicago, the Adler Planetarium , and the Antiquarian Booksellers' Association of America. He was a charter member of the Chicago Map Society.

He served on the Steering Committee of the Philip Lee Phillips Map Society of Library of Congress which supports the mission of the Geography and Map Division.

He served on the board of Imago Mundi: International Journal for the History of Cartography, from 1978-2020.

== Nebenzahl Lectures ==
In 1965 Nebenzahl and his wife, Jossy, established a fund to support a series of lectures in the History of Cartography at the Newberry Library named for their late son. The first Kenneth Nebenzahl Jr. Lectures in the History of Cartography were presented in 1966 by the Keeper of the Map Room at the British Library, R. A. Skelton.

The University of Chicago Press publishes The Kenneth Nebenzahl Jr. Lectures in the History of Cartography. These include:

- Decolonizing the Map : Cartography from Colony to Nation.
- Ancient Perspectives : Maps and Their Place in Mesopotamia, Egypt, Greece & Rome.
- The Imperial Map : Cartography and the Mastery of Empire.
- Art and Cartography : Six Historical Essays.
- Maps: A Historical Survey of Their Study and Collecting.

== Publications ==
- Nebenzahl, Kenneth. "A Stone Thrown at the Map Maker." The Papers of the Bibliographical Society of America 55, no. 4 (1961): 283-288.
- Nebenzahl, Kenneth. Atlas of the American Revolution. Edited by Kenneth . Chicago: Rand Mc Nally. 1974
- Nebenzahl, Kenneth, and Mazal Holocaust Collection. 1986. Maps of the Holy Land : Images of Terra Sancta through Two Millennia. New York: Abbeville Press.
- Nebenzahl, Kenneth, and Rand McNally and Company. 1990. Atlas of Columbus and the Great Discoveries. Chicago: Rand McNally.
- Nebenzahl, Kenneth. 2004. Mapping the Silk Road and beyond : 2,000 Years of Exploring the East. London: Phaidon.
