= Marc Simenon =

French film director (1939–1999)

Marc Jean Chrétien Simenon (19 April 1939 – 24 October 1999) was a French director and screenwriter. Born in Brussels, Belgium, he was the son of writer Georges Simenon (1903–1989) and the husband of Mylène Demongeot from 16 September 1968 up until his death. On October 24, 1999, Simenon died after sustaining a fall from the stairs of his home in Paris. He was 60 years old.

== Filmography ==
=== Film ===
- 1959: Le Déjeuner sur l'herbe by Jean Renoir
- 1964: Le Gendarme de Saint-Tropez by Jean Girault
- 1964: Les Gorilles de Jean Girault
- 1965: Le Gendarme à New York by Jean Girault
- 1970: Le Champignon
- 1971: L'Explosion
- 1972: Douce est la revanche
- 1974: By the Blood of Others (Par le sang des autres)
- 1977: La Moto qui tue (L’Échappatoire) by Claude Patin
- 1981: Signé Furax

=== Television ===
- 1968: Les Dossiers de l'agence O
- 1980: Kick, Raoul, la moto, les jeunes et les autres
- 1986: Le Petit docteur
- 1992: Vacances au purgatoire
- 1994–1995: Chien et chat
- 1996: Chercheurs d'or
- 1998: Micro climat
