= Michèle Cloonan =

American library and information science educator

Michèle V. Cloonan (born July 14, 1955) is an American library and information science educator. She is a professor in the School of Library and Information Science at Simmons University, in Boston, Massachusetts, and Dean Emerita of the Graduate School of Library and Information Science at Simmons. She is an advocate for the preservation of cultural heritage.

Cloonan is known for her interdisciplinary approach to the study of preservation. She has examined preservation's cultural, political, social, and historical aspects and called for an increased respect for cultural differences in the preservation of cultural objects. She has also studied the role of women in book trade history with a particular focus on bookbinding and collecting.

== Biography ==
Born in Chicago, Illinois, Cloonan graduated from Bennington College in 1975. She has an A.M. in the humanities from the University of Chicago, and an M.S., and Ph.D. in library and information science from the University of Illinois.

Cloonan has worked as a book conservator (Newberry Library), a preservation administrator (Brown University) and rare book curator (Smith College). At UCLA she was an assistant and associate professor, and chair of the Department of Information Studies (1997-2002). At Simmons University she was dean and professor of the Graduate School of Library and Information Science from 2002-2012. Since then she has been professor and Dean Emerita at Simmons.

From 2013-2018 she was editor of Preservation, Digital Technology & Culture, published by De Gruyter. She has served on the board of directors of the Northeast Document Conservation Center since 2017.

She is the proprietor of the Doe Press, with her husband Sidney E. Berger. Publications include: Thom Gunn. Lament, 1985; Ernest Kroll. Six Letters to An Apprentice, 1994; Donald Justice. Banjo Dog, 1995, and Michele Cloonan, The Invisible Presence of Gertrude Stiles, 2010.

Also with Sidney E. Berger, she compiled a collection of more than 22,000 pieces of paper, now the Berger-Cloonan Collection of Decorated Paper at the Cushing Library, Texas A&M University.

=== Awards ===
- University of Mary Washington Center for Historic Preservation, 2019 Book Prize for The Monumental Challenge of Preservation: The Past in a Volatile World.
- Society of American Archivists Preservation Publication Award 2016 for Preserving Our Heritage: Perspectives from Antiquity to the Digital Age.
- Service Award, Association for Library and Information Science Education (ALISE), 2010.
- Paul Banks and Carolyn Harris Preservation Award, Association for Library Collections and Technical Services, American Library Association, 2010.

== Publications ==
- Advancing Preservation, with Elizabeth Joffrion. Chicago: Society of American Archivists, 2020. (ISBN 978-1-945246-35-7)
- "Has American Exceptionalism Made the United States an Outlier on the Global Academic Stage?" Charleston Library Conference 2018, Proceedings, Purdue University Press, 2019.
- Libraries, Archives, and Museums Today: Insights from the Field, with Peter Botticelli and Martha Mahard. Lanham, MD: Rowman & Littlefield, 2019. (ISBN 978-1-5381-2554-0)
- The Monumental Challenge of Preservation: The Past in a Volatile World. Cambridge: MIT Press, 2018. (ISBN 978-0-262-03773-0)
- Special Issue: Protecting Cultural Heritage Today: Challenges and New Opportunities. Co-author of articles on Europe, Africa, Syria, and Asia. Preservation, Digital Technology & Culture 45.2 (2016).
- Preserving Our Heritage: Perspectives from Antiquity to the Digital Age. Selections and Commentary by Michele V. Cloonan. Chicago: ALA; London: Facet, 2015. (ISBN 978-1-55570-937-2)
- "Janus at 60: Performance & Participation." Parenthesis 29 (Autumn 2015).
- With Jeannette Bastian and Ross Harvey, "From Teacher to Learner to User: Developing a Digital Stewardship Pedagogy," Library Trends 59.4 (Spring 2011).
  - Winner of the ACRL-New England Chapter Best Paper Award, 2012.
- With Rebecca Knuth, "Libraries, Archives, and the Pursuit of Access," chapter 13, in volume 4 of, The Impact of 9-11: The Day that Changed Everything? Edited by Matthew J. Morgan and Rory Stewart. Palgrave Macmillan, 2009. (ISBN 978-0-230-10300-9)
- "The Paradox of Preservation," Library Trends (Summer 2007), co-edited by Ross Harvey and Michèle Cloonan, The Preservation of Cultural Heritage.
- "The Moral Imperative to Preserve," Library Trends (Winter 2007).
- "A Storied Legacy of Learning," The Boston Globe (November 18, 2007).
- "Alice Millard and the Gospel of Beauty and Taste," chapter in Women in Print, University of Wisconsin Press, 2006. (ISBN 0-299-21783-3)
