= The Twilight Club of Pasadena (California) =

The Twilight Club
- Founded: October 16, 1895
- Type: Private Social Club
- Activities: Evening dinner meetings with program
- Membership: Limited to 135
- Admission: Through sponsorship by a member
- Meetings: 8 per year, mostly at Annandale Golf Club
- Archives: Maintained by Pasadena Museum of History

The Twilight Club of Pasadena (California) is a private social group that was founded in 1895 as an organization where prominent men could assemble on a regular basis and be stimulated by lectures from notables of the day and entertained by individuals and groups of distinguished talent. From its earliest days its membership size was fixed and a waiting list kept. Its sole function was to serve as a convocation of interested and interesting people who gathered to hear speakers on issues of the day. The group met eight evenings a year. The group is much the same today.

== History ==
The club was founded during a very active period in the life of the new city of Pasadena. Other institutions that began life around the time of the Twilight Club’s founding were the Rose Parade in 1890 and Throop Institute (now the California Institute of Technology) in 1891. Pasadena had been incorporated 22 years earlier as the first city in Los Angeles County other than the City of Los Angeles.

The Club staked out strongly anti-German, anti-Irish, anti-Black, and generally xenophobic views in its early years, though it did support questionable policies it believed benefited Native Americans in California. Although the Club had female speakers throughout its history, it did not admit its first female member until 1995, a century after the Club's founding.

John Windell Wood, in his Pasadena, California, Historical and Personal: A Complete History of the Organization of the Indiana Colony, wrote, “This club represents the highest type of intellectual life in men’s clubs, and with it membership limited to eighty, there is always a long waiting list.”

== Present Club ==
The Twilight Club meets eight times a year, has a fixed limit of 135 members and still has a waiting list of individuals who have been proposed by existing members, vetted by a committee and who have been voted on by the overall membership. The most significant change is that the group is no longer all-male. The first woman admitted into the club was The Honorable Cynthia H. Hall, a judge on the Ninth District Court of Appeals, in 1995.

The club keeps careful records of its programs and can document every speaker and subject of every single meeting back to its November, 1895, meeting when Charles F. Lummis spoke on “The Pleasures of Southern California.” The Pasadena Museum of History keeps the club’s archives.

== Speakers ==
Its speakers over the years have included:

- General Thaddeus Lowe, on his use of lighter than air balloons in the recent Civil War.
- Poet Alfred Noyes, on his own verse
- Astronomer Edwin P. Hubble
- Author and Ambassador Clare Boothe Luce
- Economist Arthur Laffer
- Photographer A. C. Vroman with lantern slides of Indians who’d been fighting the U.S. only a few decades before
- E. A. Bachelder on the new “Arts and Crafts Movement”
- Author Upton Sinclair
- Nobel laureate and physicist Robert A. Millikan
- Aerospace Engineer Theodore von Kármán
- Journalist, novelist, screenwriter Adela Rogers St. Johns

The list also includes various U.S. Cabinet members, mayors of Los Angeles, successive presidents of Caltech and the Jet Propulsion Laboratory. In 1912 the club hosted Sir Thomas Lipton of tea fame, whose British International yacht race became the America’s Cup.

== Notable Members ==
Twilight Club members have included architects Charles and Henry Greene; industrialists R. Stanton Avery, Arnold Beckman, Joe “Trader Joe” Coulombe; Protestant leader Rev. Eugene Carson Blake; Herbert Hoover, Jr. and successive presidents of the University of Southern California, Caltech and the Jet Propulsion Laboratory.

== See also ==
- Membership discrimination in California clubs

== Bibliography ==
- Read, Nat B. The Twilight Club of Pasadena. Pasadena 2008
- Edwards, Dr. Walter A. The Twilight Club of Pasadena; Its History and Regulations 1935
- 75 Years of the Twilight Club; The Twilight Club of Pasadena, 75th Anniversary. 1970
- 1895 – 1995 The Twilight Club of Pasadena; Centennial, Green Street Press, 1995
- Wood, John Windell. Pasadena, California, Historical and Personal: A Complete History of the Organization of the Indiana Colony, 1917
