= Mylène Demongeot =

French actress and author (1935–2022)

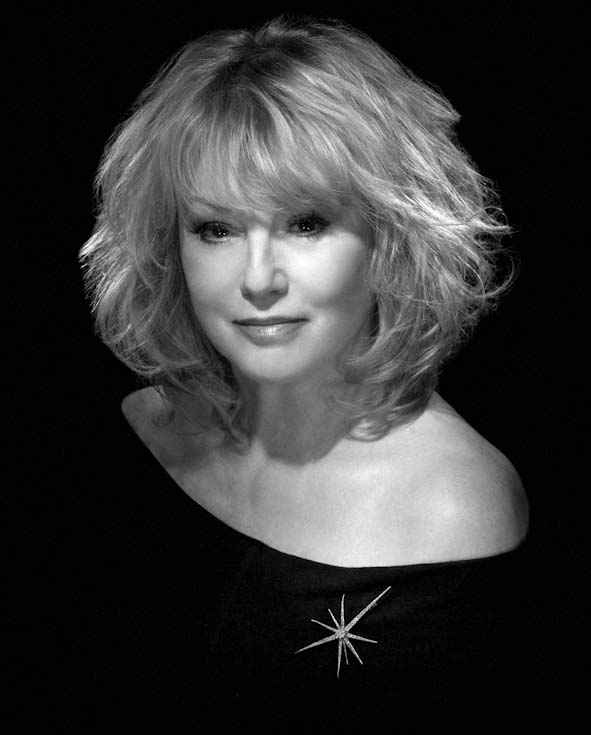
- Demongeot in 2008
- Born: Marie-Hélène Demongeot; 29 September 1935; Nice, France
- Died: 1 December 2022 (aged 87); Paris, France
- Occupation: Actress
- Years active: 1953–2022
- Spouses: Henri Coste (m. 1958; div. 1968) Marc Simenon (m. 1968; died 1999)

Mylène Demongeot (French pronunciation: [milɛn dəmɔ̃ʒo]; born Marie-Hélène Demongeot [maʁi elɛn]; 29 September 1935 – 1 December 2022) was a French film, television and theatre actress and author with a career spanning seven decades and more than 100 credits in French, Italian, English and Japanese speaking productions.

Demongeot became a star at age 21 with her portrayal of Abigail Williams in The Crucible (1957) which garnered her a BAFTA Award for Most Promising Newcomer to Leading Film Roles nomination and the best actress prize at the socialist Karlovy Vary International Film Festival. Some other notable film roles include Elsa in Otto Preminger's Bonjour Tristesse (1958), alongside Deborah Kerr and David Niven, and as Milady de Winter in Les Trois Mousquetaires (1961).

A "veteran of cinema" who started as one of the blond sex symbols of the 1950s and 1960s, she managed to avoid typecasting by exploring many film genres including thrillers, westerns, comedies, swashbucklers, period films and even pepla, such as Romulus and the Sabines (1961) opposite Roger Moore or Gold for the Caesars (1963).

Demongeot also has a cult following based on the Fantomas trilogy, as Hélène Gurn opposite Louis de Funès and Jean Marais: Fantômas (1964), Fantômas Unleashed (1965) and Fantômas Against Scotland Yard (1967). Thirty years later, she starred again in another one of France's most successful comedy trilogies as Madame Pic in Fabien Onteniente's Camping (2006), Camping 2 (2010) and Camping 3 (2016).

She was twice nominated for Best Supporting Actress at the César Awards for 36 Quai des Orfèvres (2004) and French California (2006). In 2007, she was made a Commander of the Ordre des Arts et de Lettres of the French Republic. In 2017, she was inducted into the Légion d'Honneur by ethologist and neurologist Boris Cyrulnik, with the rank of Chevalier.

She remained popular until her death from peritoneal cancer. At the time of her death, she was starring in Thomas Gilou's film Maison de retraite (2022) alongside Gérard Depardieu, one of the biggest box office hits of 2022 in France. Through an Élysée Palace official tribune, President Emmanuel Macron paid a long tribute to her which included : "we salute the career of a great figure in the French Seventh Art, who knew how to shine in all its genres to move all French people".

== Early life ==
Demongeot was born in September 1935 in Nice, Alpes-Maritimes, the daughter and only child of Alfred Jean Demongeot, a high-ranking civil servant, born on 30 January 1897 in Nice (himself the son of Commandant Marie Joseph Marcel Demongeot and Clotilde Faussonne di Clavesana, an Italian aristocrat) and Claudia Troubnikova, born on 17 May 1904 in Kharkiv (Ukraine, Russian Empire). Her parents, both actors themselves, had met in Shanghai, China, where her half-brother, Léonid Ivantov, from the first marriage of her mother, was born, in Harbin on 17 December 1923.

Like hundreds of other major European figures of stage and screen, she trained at the Cours Simon in Paris where her classmates included Jean-Pierre Cassel, Claude Berri and Guy Bedos. She was a classically trained pianist and her first ambition was of becoming a professional.

== Career ==
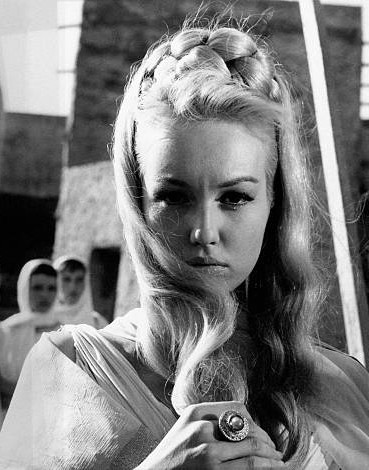
Demongeot in Romulus and the Sabines, 1961

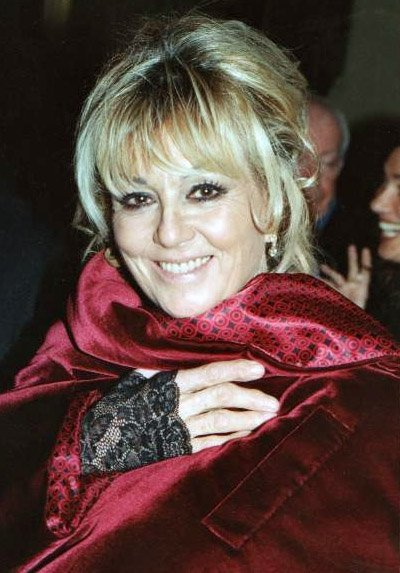
Mylène Demongeot at the César Award ceremony in 2005

In the United Kingdom she appeared in several comedies, including It's A Wonderful World (1956) and Upstairs and Downstairs (1959). Several of her films were made for the Rank Organisation.

Between September 2013 and June 2014, she was a columnist member of the radio show Les Grosses Têtes by Philippe Bouvard on RTL.

== Personal life ==
Demongeot was married to director Marc Simenon from 1968 until his death in 1999. She resided in a country house in Mayenne surrounded by animals. She was a member of the honor committee of the Association pour le droit de mourir dans la dignité (English: Right to Die with Dignity - ADMD; a member of the World Federation of Right to Die Societies).

Demongeot was the victim of a financial scam set up by her account manager who stole €2 million from her, money which was used to make loans to numerous high-profile personalities, like Isabelle Adjani, Alexandre Arcady or Samy Naceri. Justice took hold of the case in June 2012 and two banks were found guilty. She recounts these years of proceedings in her book Très chers escrocs… (2019, English: Very Dear Crooks…).

Demongeot died of primary peritoneal cancer on 1 December 2022, at the age of 87.

=== Quotes ===
Among the quotes on or from her colleagues, are found:

- Brigitte Bardot wrote in one of her books: "Mylène was my little cinema sister, then became my combat sister, a libra like me, she has always loved animals, even going so far as to save a baby lion from set that she brought back to the hotel which hosted her during the filming".
- Arthur Miller wrote: "Mylene Demongeot was [in The Crucible] truly beautiful, and so bursting with real sexuality as to become a generalized force whose effects on the community transcended herself."
- Demongeot met Gary Cooper at the opening of the first escalator to be installed in a cinema, at the Rex Theatre in Paris, on 7 June 1957. She declared in a filmed interview: "Gary Cooper was sublime, there I have to say, now he, was part of the stars, Gary Cooper, Cary Grant, John Wayne, those great Americans who I've met really were unbelievable guys, there aren't any like them anymore."
- On David Niven she said in a filmed interview: "He was like a lord, he was part of those great actors who were extraordinary like Dirk Bogarde, individuals with lots of class, elegance and humour. I only saw David get angry once. Preminger had discharged him for the day but eventually asked to get him. I said, sir, you had discharged him, he left for Deauville to gamble at the casino. So we rented a helicopter so they immediately went and grabbed him. Two hours later, he was back, full of rage. There I saw David lose his British phlegm, his politeness and class. It was royal. [Laughs]."

== Filmography ==
Year	Title	Role	Director	Notes
1953	Children of Love	Nicole	Léonide Moguy	
1955	Frou-Frou	The mistress	Augusto Genina	
1955	School for Love	The vocalist	Marc Allégret	
1955	Papa, maman, ma femme et moi	The woman at the door	Jean-Paul Le Chanois	
1956	Quand vient l'amour	Micheline	Maurice Cloche	
1956	It's A Wonderful World	Georgie Dubois	Val Guest	Credited as Mylène Nicole
1957	The Crucible	Abigail Williams	Raymond Rouleau	Karlovy Vary International Film Festival - Best Actress; Nominated - BAFTA Award for Most Promising Newcomer to Leading Film Roles
1957	A Kiss for a Killer	Éva Dollan	Henri Verneuil	
1958	That Night	Sylvie Mallet	Maurice Cazeneuve	
1958	Bonjour tristesse	Elsa	Otto Preminger	
1958	Be Beautiful But Shut Up	Virginie Dumayet	Marc Allégret	
1959	Le vent se lève	Catherine Mougin	Yves Ciampi	
1959	Women are Weak	Sabine	Michel Boisrond	
1959	Bad Girls Don't Cry	Laura	Mauro Bolognini	
1959	The Giant of Marathon	Andromeda	Jacques Tourneur & Mario Bava	
1959	Upstairs and Downstairs	Ingrid	Ralph Thomas	
1960	Love in Rome	Anna Padoan	Dino Risi	
1960	Under Ten Flags	Zizi	Duilio Coletti	
1961	The Three Musketeers	Milady de Winter	Bernard Borderie	
1961	The Singer Not the Song	Locha de Cortinez	Roy Ward Baker	
1961	Romulus and the Sabines	Réa	Richard Pottier	
1962	Copacabana Palace	Zina von Raunacher	Steno	
1962	I Don Giovanni della Costa Azzurra		Vittorio Sala	
1963	Girl's Apartment	Mélanie	Michel Deville	
1963	Doctor in Distress	Sonia & Helga Stronberg	Ralph Thomas	
1963	Gold for the Caesars	Penelope	Andre de Toth & Sabatino Ciuffini	
1963	Because, Because of a Woman	Lisette	Michel Deville	
1964	Fantômas	Hélène Gurn	André Hunebelle	
1964	Cherchez l'idole	Herself	Michel Boisrond	
1965	Uncle Tom's Cabin	Harriet	Géza von Radványi	
1965	Fantômas se déchaîne	Hélène Gurn	Haroun Tazieff & André Hunebelle	
1965	OSS 117 Mission for a Killer	Anna-Maria Sulza	André Hunebelle	
1966	Tender Scoundrel	Muriel	Jean Becker	
1967	Fantômas contre Scotland Yard	Hélène Gurn	André Hunebelle	
1968	The Private Navy of Sgt. O'Farrell	Gabby	Frank Tashlin	
1968	Les dossiers de l'agence O	Myle Holga	Marc Simenon	TV series (1 Episode)
1969	The Thirteen Chairs	Judy	Nicolas Gessner	
1970	The Mushroom	Anne Calder	Marc Simenon	
1971	L'Explosion	Katia	Marc Simenon	
1972	The Rebels (Quelques arpents de neige)	Laura	Denis Héroux	
1972	Montreal Blues		Pascal Gélinas	
1973	Enuff Is Enuff (J'ai mon voyage!)	Madame De Chatiez	Denis Héroux	
1973	Les aventures du capitaine Luckner	Daphne	François Villiers	TV series (1 Episode)
1974	By the Blood of Others	The prostitute	Marc Simenon	
1975	Les noces de porcelaine	Julia	Roger Coggio	
1975	Il faut vivre dangereusement	Laurence	Claude Makovski	
1977	L'échappatoire	Elisabeth	Claude Patin	
1977	Recherche dans l'intérêt des familles	Alcine Briant	Philippe Arnal	TV series (1 Episode)
1978	Douze heures pour mourir	Germaine	Abder Isker	TV movie
1979	Un jour un tueur	Cécile Pallas	Serge Korber	
1980	Kick, Raoul, la moto, les jeunes et les autres	Martine	Marc Simenon	TV series (1 Episode)
1981	Signé Furax	Malvina	Marc Simenon	
1982	Marion	Marion Treguier	Jean Pignol	TV series (6 Episodes)
1983	Le bâtard	Brigitte	Bertrand Van Effenterre	
1983	Flics de choc	The teacher	Jean-Pierre Desagnat	
1983	Surprise Party	Geneviève Lambert	Roger Vadim	
1984	Retenez Moi...Ou Je Fais Un Malheur	The bench woman	Michel Gérard	
1984	Série noire	The Baroness	Jacques Rouffio	TV series (1 Episode)
1986	Tenue de soirée	Wife in house 3	Bertrand Blier	
1986	Paulette, la pauvre petite milliardaire	Madame Gulderbilt	Claude Confortès	
1988	Big Man	Fernande	Steno	TV Mini-Series
1989	The Man Who Lived at the Ritz	Madame Rochaise	Desmond Davis	TV movie
1992	Vacances au purgatoire	Mathilde	Marc Simenon	TV movie
1994	La Piste du télégraphe	Muriel	Liliane de Kermadec	
1994	Minder	Madeleine	Ken Hannam	TV series (1 Episode)
1995	Chien et chat	Annabelle Montbrial	Marc Simenon	TV series (1 Episode)
1997	L'Homme idéal	Guillemette	Xavier Gélin	
2004	Victoire	The mother	Stéphanie Murat	
2004	Red Lights	The summer camp director	Cédric Kahn	
2004	36 Quai des Orfèvres	Manou Berliner	Olivier Marchal	Nominated - César Award for Best Supporting Actress
2005	Tokyo Tower	The governess	Takashi Minamoto	
2005	La tête haute	La Tine	Gérard Jourd'hui	TV movie
2006	Camping	Laurette Pic	Fabien Onteniente	
2006	French California	Katia	Jacques Fieschi	Nominated - César Award for Best Supporting Actress
2007	Les toits de Paris	Thérèse	Huner Saleem	
2007	Le fantôme du lac	Louise Perreau	Philippe Niang	TV movie
2009	Tricheuse	Madame Vallardin	Jean-François Davy	
2009	Oscar and the Lady in Pink	Lily	Éric-Emmanuel Schmitt	
2010	Camping 2	Laurette Pic	Fabien Onteniente	
2011	Si tu meurs, je te tue	Geneviève	Huner Saleem	
2011	Maman !	The mother	Hélène de Fougerolles	Short
2013	On My Way	Fanfan	Emmanuelle Bercot	
2013	La balade de Lucie	The mother	Sandrine Ray	TV movie
2013	Les mauvaises têtes	Virginie	Pierre Isoard	TV movie
2014	Des roses en hiver	Madeleine	Lorenzo Gabriele	TV movie
2015	No Limit	Christine Libérati	Ludovic Colbeau-Justin	TV series (2 Episodes)
2016	Camping 3	Laurette Pic	Fabien Onteniente	
2016	3 Mariages et un coup de foudre	Mamita	Gilles de Maistre	TV movie
2017	The Midwife	Rolande	Martin Provost	
2017	Caïn	Jacqueline Benedetti	Bertrand Arthuys	TV series (1 Episode)
2018	Infidèle	Giulia	Didier Le Pêcheur	TV Mini-Series
2018	A l'intérieur	Rose Da Costa	Vincent Lannoo	TV series (2 Episodes)
2022	Maison de Retraite	Simone Tournier	Thomas Gilou	

== Theater ==
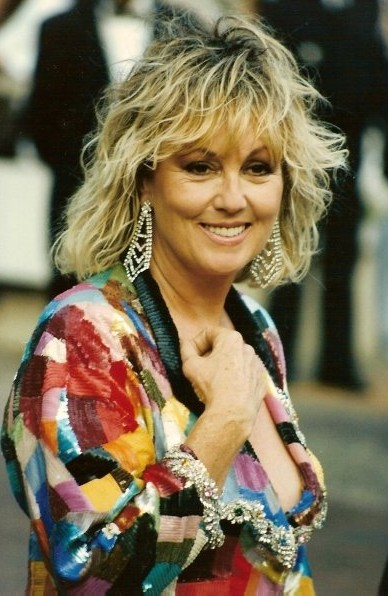
Mylène Demongeot at the Festival de Cannes 1990.

Year	Title	Author	Director
1958	Dangerous Corner	John Boynton Priestley	Raymond Rouleau
1968	Gugusse	Marcel Achard	Michel Roux
1988	Salome	Oscar Wilde	Francis Sourbié
1988	Caviale e lenticchie	Giulio Scarnicci & Renzo Tarabusi	Jacques Rosny
1992	The Secretary Bird	William Douglas-Home	Pierre Mondy
1992	Piège pour un homme seul	Robert Thomas	Robert Thomas
1994	Electra	Jean Giraudoux	Raymond Gérôme
1994	Un homme pressé	Bernard Chartreux	Jean-Pierre Vincent
2000	Becket	Jean Anouilh	Didier Long
2017	Love Letters	A. R. Gurney	Stéphanie Fagadau

== Bibliography ==
- Demongeot, Mylène (September 2001). Tiroirs secrets. Paris: Le Pré aux Clercs. ISBN 2-84228-131-4.
