= Georges Géret =

French actor

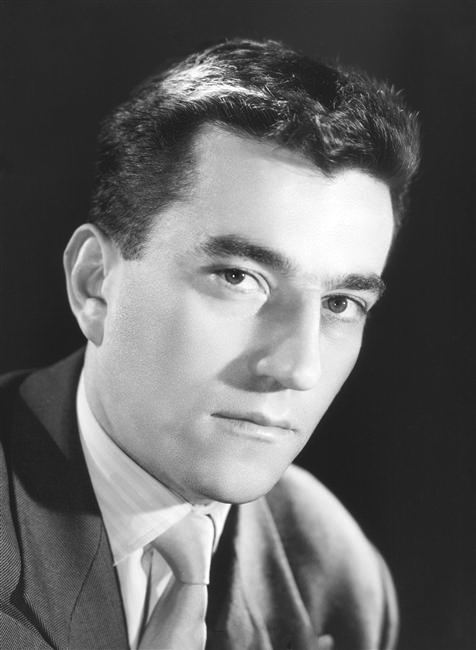
- Géret in 1956
- Born: 18 October 1924; Lyon, France
- Died: 7 April 1996 (aged 71); Paris, France
- Occupation: Actor
- Years active: 1954–1992

Georges Géret (18 October 1924 – 7 April 1996) was a French film actor. He appeared in over 80 films between 1954 and 1992. He was born in Lyon, France.

== Selected filmography ==
- The Unfrocked One (1954) - Un militaire à l'Oflag et à l'église
- Les Nuits de Montmartre (1955)
- L'Homme aux clés d'or (1956) - L'avocat de la défense
- Ces dames préfèrent le mambo (1957) - Le policier de Miami
- Le Désert de Pigalle (1958) - René
- Ramuntcho (1959) - Arrochkoa
- Le Caïd (1960) - Jo
- Le Sahara brûle (1961)
- Climats (1962)
- Le monte-charge (1962) - Un homme se disputant au bar
- Diary of a Chambermaid (1964) - Joseph
- L'Insoumis (1964) - Le lieutenant Fraser
- Weekend at Dunkirk (1964) - Pinot
- Mata Hari, Agent H21 (1964) - Soldier #2
- Crime on a Summer Morning (1965) - Max Zegetti
- The Sleeping Car Murders (1965) - Un agent de police (uncredited)
- God's Thunder (1965) - Roger
- La Métamorphose des cloportes (1965) - Joseph Rouquemoute dit Le Rouquin
- The Poppy Is Also a Flower (1966) - Superintendent Roche
- Roger la Honte (1966) - Roger Laroque
- Is Paris Burning? (1966) - The Baker
- La Grande Sauterelle (1967) - Marco
- Dead Run (1967) - Carlos
- The Stranger (1967) - Raymond Sintes
- Love in the Night (1968) - Bourgoin
- The Most Beautiful Month (1968) - Cyprien Boromès
- They Came to Rob Las Vegas (1968) - Leroy
- A Quiet Place in the Country (1968) - Attilio
- Ankle Bone (1968) - Jean
- The Southern Star (1969) - Andre
- Z (1969) - Nick
- Le Bourgeois gentil mec (1969) - Durante
- A Very Curious Girl (1969) - Gaston Duvalier
- The Mushroom (1970) - Kurt
- Le Pistonné (1970) - Corsican Adjutant
- Les Jambes en l'air (1971) - César Grandblaise
- Biribi (1971) - Craponi
- A Reason to Live, a Reason to Die (1972) - Sergente Spike
- L'Insolent (1973) - Marco
- Un officier de police sans importance (1973) - Rémy Scoto
- Le mataf (1973) - Basilio Hagon
- La Punition (1973) - Manuel
- Le Solitaire (1973) - François Gosset
- By the Blood of Others (1974) - L'inspecteur
- La Gueule de l'emploi (1974) - Le boxeur
- Le Protecteur (1974) - Samuel Malakian
- Le Bougnoul (1975) - Le chauffeur de l'autobus
- Le Faux-cul (1975) - Rousselet
- The Track (La Traque) (1975) - Le braconnier
- Spermula (1976) - Grop
- Et vive la liberté ! (1976) - Le sergent
- L'Amour en question (1978) - Le commissaire Lachot
- Cop or Hood (1979) - Theodore Musard
- La Gueule de l'autre (1979) - Commissaire Javert
- Le Guignolo (1980) - Joseph
- Signé Furax (1981) - Capitaine Fauderche
- Teheran 43 (1981) - Dennis Pew
- La Guérilléra (1982) - El Mariscal
- Pour cent briques, t'as plus rien... (1982) - Bouvard
- Salut la puce (1983) - Le poète
- La bête noire (1983) - M. Guyot
- Das Autogramm (1984) - Dr. Gallo
- Urgence (1985) - Patrick Villard
- Exit-exil (1986) - Joachim
- Hôtel du Paradis (1986) - Dr. Jacob
- I ragazzi di via Panisperna (1988) - Francese, amico di ettore
- Stranger in the House (1992) - Ange Brunetti
