= Sarah M. Pritchard =

American librarian

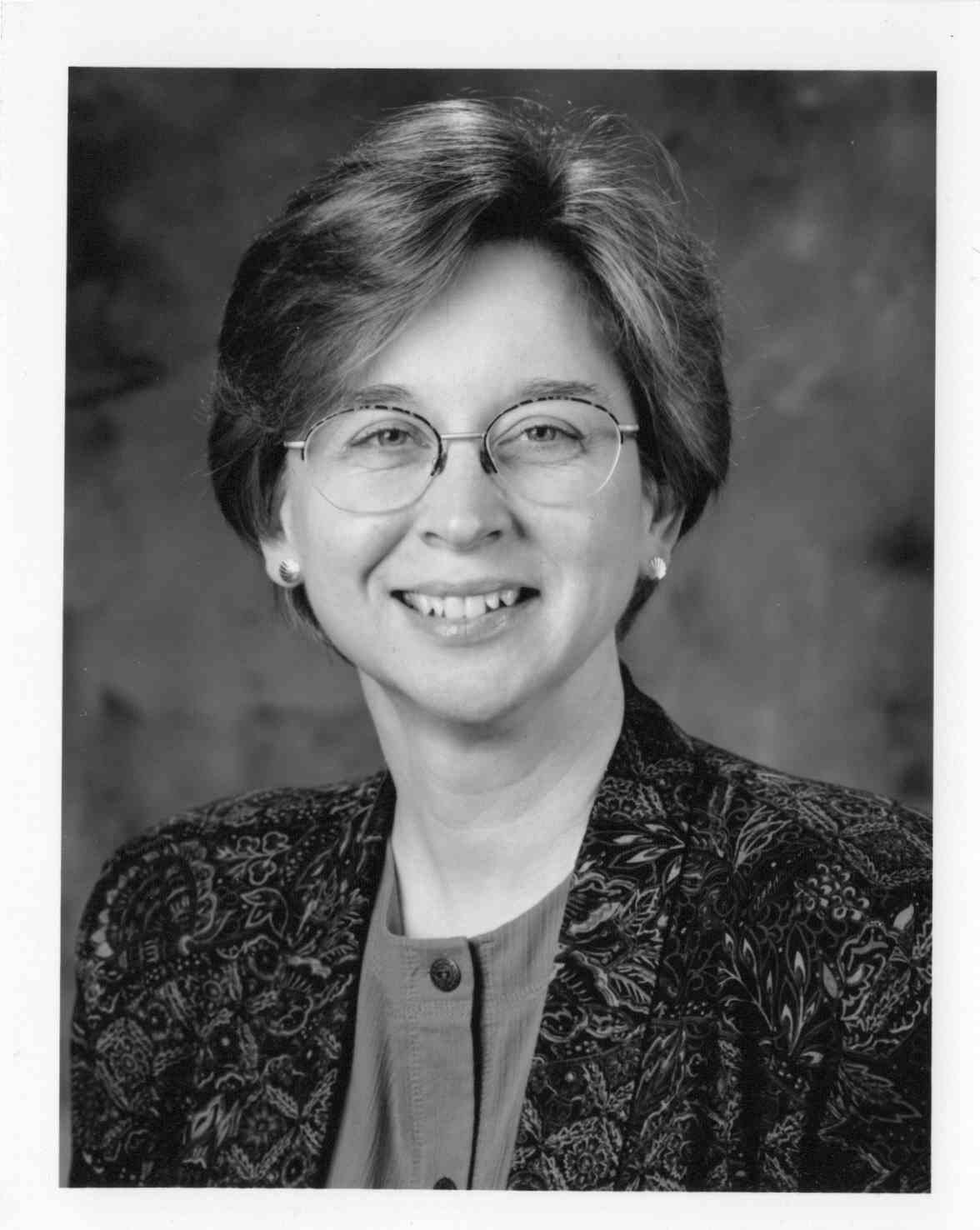
- Education: University of Maryland; University of Wisconsin-Madison MA French Literature); MA Library and Information Science
- Occupations: Librarian, scholar, educator

Sarah M. Pritchard is an American academic librarian known for her contributions to research library governance, women's studies and the future of digital libraries.

== Education and career ==
Pritchard graduated with a bachelor's degree in French Studies from the University of Maryland in 1975, and two master's degrees in French Literature (1976) and Library Science (1977) from the University of Wisconsin-Madison.

Pritchard has held leadership positions in academic institutions, influencing library administration, digital initiatives, and scholarly research. Her expertise encompasses diverse areas, including women studies, feminism, collection development, technology integration, scholarly communication, and international library partnerships. She has made significant contributions to diversity and inclusion within the academic and research library field.

Pritchard began her career in 1977 at the Library of Congress where she later became the first reference specialist in women’s studies, then head of the Library’s Microform Reading room.

In 1988 she was selected for the Council on Library Resources’ Academic Library Management Intern program and then served as Associate Executive Director (1990–1992) of the Association of Research Libraries.

In 1992 she was appointed Director of Libraries at Smith College where she served until 1999.

From 1999 to 2006 Pritchard was University Librarian at the University of California-Santa Barbara, overseeing library services, collections, digital resources, capital projects, fundraising and consortial initiatives.

In 2006 Pritchard was appointed Charles Deering McCormick University Librarian and Dean of Libraries at Northwestern University She retired in 2023. Accomplishments over her tenure included expanding the collections to over 7 million items, developing a 20-year strategic space plan, construction of a high-density climate controlled shelving facility, transformation of the Mudd Library building, establishing positions for digital humanities and data management, new collaborations with other campus entities such as the Block Museum of Art, overseeing an improved business model for the University Press, and formally confirming the faculty status of librarians.

== Professional associations and editing ==
Pritchard has held numerous offices in library professional associations and regional consortia, including 13 years on the governing Council of the American Library Association (ALA).

She also served on the ALA Committee on the Status of Women in Librarianship, and was chair, Women's Studies Section of the Association of College and Research Libraries. She served on the Task Force that produced A Women’s Thesaurus.

In 2003, the Governor of California, Gray Davis, appointed Pritchard as a member of the Library of California Board.

Pritchard was the compiler of the Association of Research Libraries publications, ARL Statistics (1989–91) and the ARL Salary Survey (1990–91).

Pritchard was founding board member of portal – Libraries and the Academy published by the Johns Hopkins University Press and editor from 2009-2014.

She served on the Board of the Center for Research Libraries from 2017-2020.

Pritchard has been invited to present her research at professional conferences in Europe, Asia and South America, and presented the program, “Libraries and the Persistence of Knowledge,” as the George Carlington Simmons Lecture at the University of the Southern Caribbean in 2018.

She served on the Association of Research Libraries Board of Directors from 2019-2022.

She was a founding director of the Chicago Collections Consortium an organization of libraries, museums, historical societies, and other cultural heritage organizations collaborating to preserve and promote the history of the Chicago region. and served on its Board for over 10 years, including three as the chair.

From 2023 to 2025, Pritchard was President of the Caxton Club in Chicago, where she was instrumental in promoting bibliophily and the appreciation of fine printing through various events and initiatives. Previous to her tenure, Pritchard was actively engaged with scholars, collectors, and curators in special collections and archives.

== Honors and awards ==
- Phi Beta Kappa, University of Maryland, 1975.
- Wisconsin Alumni Research Foundation (WARF) graduate fellowships: 1975–77.
- Library of Congress awards: Meritorious Service, 1984; Special Achievement, 1986, 1988.
- American Library Association Equality Award 1997.
- University of Wisconsin School of Library and Information Studies, Outstanding Alumna, 1997.
- Association of College and Research Libraries/Greenwood Press, Career Achievement in Women's Studies, 2001.
- Deering Family Award, 2022.

== Family ==
Her father, Wilbur Pritchard, was a satellite engineering pioneer and her mother, Kathleen Pritchard, was an award-winning horologist.

== Selected publications ==
- “Collaborating to Shape New Information Services,” portal: Libraries and the Academy 16:4 (October 2016), pp. 691–695.
- “Report from the Repositories and Preservation Workgroup,” co-author, Proceedings of the Open Scholarship Initiative, 1 (2016), George Mason University. http://dx.doi.org/10.13021/G89W24.
- “Innovative Research in Libraries: Do Editorials, Agendas, or Think Tanks Make a Difference?” portal: Libraries and the Academy 14, no. 2 (April 2014): 133-136.
- “Special Collections and Assessing the Value of Academic Libraries,” RBM: A Journal of Rare Books, Manuscripts and Cultural Heritage 13:2 (Fall 2012), pp. 191–194.
- Pritchard, Sarah M. (February 29, 2012). "Library History and Women's History: An Ongoing Convergence". American Libraries Magazine.
- “Deconstructing the Library: Reconceptualizing Collections, Spaces and Services.” Journal of Library Administration 48:2 (2008), pp. 219–233.
- “The Converging Trends of Media Ownership and Copyright Extension: The Impact on Access to Scholarly Information,” pp. 373–389 in Ronald E. Rice (Ed.), Media Ownership: Research and Regulation. Cresskill, NJ: Hampton Press., 2007.
- “Informatics and Knowledge Management for Faculty Research Data.” With Smiti Anand and Larry Carver. EDUCAUSE Center for Applied Research, Research Bulletin 2005: 2 (January 18, 2005).
- “Budget Care for the Heart of the University: Diet or Surgery?” Library Issues 24:4 (March 2004).
- “From Stone Tablets to the Internet: The Library Delivers the Universe to you. ” Coastlines 32:4 (Spring 2002): 6–9, 28.
- “Libraries and the Undergraduate Curriculum.” Library Issues 17:3 (January 1997).
- “Determining Quality in Academic Libraries.” Library Trends 44:3 (Winter 1996): 572–594.
- “Library Benchmarking: Old Wine in New Bottles?” Journal of Academic Librarianship 21:6 (November 1995): 491–495. [Paper for ACRL 7th Annual Conference, Pittsburgh, PA, March 30, 1995.]
- “Women’s Studies Scholarship: Its Impact on the Information World.” In Women, Information, and the Future: Collecting and Sharing Resources Worldwide, ed. Eva Steiner Moseley, pp. 15–23. Fort Atkinson, WI: Highsmith Press, 1995.
- “Foreign Acquisitions.” In Collection Management: A New Treatise, ed. Charles Osburn and Ross Atkinson, pp. 351–372. (Foundations in Library and Information Science, Vol. 26B.) CT: JAI Press, 1992.
- RLG Conspectus in Women’s Studies. Stanford, CA: Research Libraries Group, 1990. 30pp. [also in Collection Development Policies for Women’s Studies, Association of College and Research Libraries, 1992.]
- The Women’s Annual, #4, 1983-1984. Edited by Sarah M. Pritchard. (Boston) G. K. Hall & Co., 1984.
