= Michel Magne =

French composer

Michel Magne (20 March 1930 in Lisieux, Calvados, France – 19 December 1984 in Cergy-Pontoise, Val-d'Oise) was a French film and experimental music composer.

== Early life ==
He was the fifth child in a family of eight. As young as age five, he was intrigued by his parents' piano. The Lisieux cathedral's organist taught him to play keyboards, and soon he played the harmonium during Sunday services. At age nine he found his parents' Wagner discs, and thereafter would often quote Wagner in his works.

He then studied music at the French: Caen Conservatory, in Caen, France. By age 16 he had written an oratorio and a piano concerto. In 1946, he left Caen to attend the Paris Conservatory, where he had lessons by Simone Plé-Caussade and Olivier Messiaen.

== Achievements, career, recording studio ==
He was nominated in 1962 for an Academy Award and Golden Globe Award for adapting the Jackie Gleason score to film Gigot. He also scored Barbarella and a series of OSS 117 films.

In 1962, he released the studio album Tropical Fantasy.

Magne wrote some songs with lyrics by Françoise Sagan for Juliette Gréco and provided orchestral accompaniment.

In 1962, he purchased the Château d'Hérouville, near Pontoise, and converted it into a residential recording studio in 1969, known as Studio d'enregistrement Michel Magne, which through the 1970s was used by a series of artists such as Elton John (at his Honky Château), Pink Floyd, David Bowie, Jethro Tull, Cat Stevens, and the Bee Gees among many others.

In the 1970s, Jean-Claude Petit scored Magne's films, without due credit.

== Personal life and death ==
In 1972, he married Marie-Claude, née Calvet, having met her in 1970 near Hérouville while she was hitch-hiking as a schoolgirl. The couple moved to the south of France in 1974.

Magne committed suicide in 1984, in a hotel room.

== Film scores ==
- 1955
  - Le Pain vivant
- 1960
  - Détournement de mineures
  - Les Sérum de bonté (TV series)
  - Les Filles sèment le vent
- 1961
  - Les Livreurs
  - Les Laches vivent d'espoir
  - Rodophe Bresdin
- 1962
  - Gigot (arranged and conducted only)
  - Le Diable et les Dix Commandements
  - Le Repos du guerrier
  - Les filles de La Rochelle
  - Konga Yo
  - Un singe en hiver
  - Les Bricoleurs
  - Le Gorille a mordu l'archevêque
- 1963
  - Les Tontons flingueurs
  - Germinal
  - Les Grands Chemins
  - Symphonie pour un massacre
  - Les Femmes d'abord
  - Le Vice et la vertu
  - Des frissons partout
  - Méfiez-vous, mesdames
  - OSS 117 se déchaîne
  - Tante Aurore viendra ce soir
  - Mélodie en sous-sol
- 1964
  - Angélique, Marquise des Anges
  - Les Barbouzes
  - Fantômas
  - La Ronde
  - Cyrano et d'Artagnan
  - La chasse à l'homme
  - Le Monocle rit jaune
  - Banco à Bangkok pour OSS 117
- The Man from Cocody
  - Les Gros bras
- 1965
  - Fantômas se déchaîne
  - How to Keep the Red Lamp Burning
  - Coplan FX 18 casse tout
  - Mission spéciale à Caracas
  - Par un beau matin d'été
  - Furia à Bahia pour OSS 117
  - A Woman in White
  - Marvelous Angelique
  - La Bonne Occase
  - Compartiment tueurs
- 1966
  - Atout cœur à Tokyo pour OSS 117
  - To Skin a Spy
  - Brigade antigangs
  - Angelique and the King
  - Galia
  - Estouffade à la Caraïbe
- 1967
  - Untamable Angelique
  - Johnny Banco
  - À cœur joie
  - Un homme de trop
  - Fantômas contre Scotland Yard
  - Batouk
- 1968
  - The Sergeant
  - Sous le signe de Monte-Cristo
  - Le Bâtard (musical direction)
  - Barbarella (musical direction)
  - Angelique and the Sultan
  - Catherine, il suffit d'un amour
  - Fleur d'oseille
- 1969
  - Les Étrangers
- 1970
  - Cran d'arrêt
  - Cold Sweat
- 1972
  - Tout le monde il est beau, tout le monde il est gentil
- 1973
  - Le Complot
  - Don Juan ou Si Don Juan était une femme... de Roger Vadim (orchestration)
  - Moi y'en a vouloir des sous
- 1974
  - Les Chinois à Paris
- 1976
  - Néa
- 1978
  - Viol
- 1982
  - Les Misérables
  - T'es folle ou quoi?
- 1983
  - S.A.S. à San Salvador
  - Surprise Party
  - L'indic
- 1984
  - Réveillon chez Bob
  - Emmanuelle 4
