= Richard Alden =

British businessman

- Born: 1963 (age 62–63)
- Occupations: Entrepreneur, business executive

Richard Alden (born 1963) is a British entrepreneur who was the founding director of Spanish telecommunications operator ONO and chief executive of communications operator Wananchi Group in East Africa. Alden is currently the president of parcel delivery startup Citibox.

== Career ==
Alden began his career as a chartered accountant at Deloitte, one of the "Big Four" accounting firms, and in 1996, was a senior manager in audit and corporate finance.

=== ONO ===
Alden became the founding director of Spanish cable and telecom firm ONO in 1998, and its CEO from 2000 to 2009, when he left the firm. In 2014, ONO was acquired by the British telecommunications company Vodafone for $10 billion and the ONO brand was completely retired in early 2019.

=== Later career ===
In 2010, Alden was appointed non-executive chairman of Mirada, a Spanish TV production firm specialising in audiovisual content interaction. That same year, he was also named president of European operations of SaaS-systems provider TOA Technologies.

Alden joined Brazil's Blue Interactive as non-executive chairman in 2011. Subsequently, he worked as non-executive vice chairman of Euskaltel SA in Spain, then joined Kenyan pay TV company Wananchi Group in 2013 as CEO. He left the group in November 2015.

Since 2019, Alden has been the president of Madrid-based delivery startup Citibox, raising €11 million.

== Personal life ==
Alden is married and divides his time between Lisbon, Madrid and Cape Town. After the end of his contract with Wananchi, Alden was charged with murder, following the death of Kenyan national Grace Wangechi Kinyanjui on 6 June 2016 at his Nairobi home. He pleaded not guilty to the charges, and was acquitted of all charges by the Kenyan Courts on 30 October 2017, following independent ballistics evidence that proved Kinyanjui had mishandled a gun and accidentally shot herself. Alden had rushed her to the hospital, where she later died.
