= Sidney E. Berger =

American historian

Sidney E. Berger is an American educator, librarian, and scholar who has worked and published extensively in literature, librarianship, and bibliography and the book arts, with a primary focus on papermaking, paper history, watermarks, and paper decoration.

== Education ==
Born in Brooklyn, NY, and raised in Los Angeles, CA, Berger received his B.A. from the University of California, Berkeley in 1965, his M.A. and PhD from the University of Iowa in 1971, and his M.S. / L.I.S. at the University of Illinois, Urbana-Champaign in 1987.

== Career ==
Since 2003 he has been adjunct professor in the School of Library and Information Science at Simmons University and adjunct professor in the iSchool / School of Library and Information Science at the University of Illinois, Urbana-Champaign. In both schools he teaches courses in rare books, special collections, and bibliography. At Simmons, he also teaches a course in editing in the Department of Communications.

As an English professor he taught at the University of California, Davis, and as an adjunct at the University of California, Riverside. From 1987 to 1990, Berger was Head of Printed Books and Head of Manuscripts at the American Antiquarian Society. He was Head of Special Collections and University Archivist at the University of California, Riverside from 1990 until 2000. From 2000 to 2003, he was the Head of the California Center for the Book, based at UCLA, where he was adjunct professor in their Library School.

Berger was the Ann C. Pingree Director of the Phillips Library at the Peabody Essex Museum from 2007 to 2014, and is now Director Emeritus of that library.

== Publications ==
His notable books are:

- A Norton Critical Edition of Mark Twain’s Pudd’nhead Wilson and Those Extraordinary Twins (New York: Norton, 1980; 2nd ed. New York: Norton, 2004) (ISBN 978-0393925357)
- Medieval English Drama: A Bibliography of Recent Criticism. New York: Garland Publishers, 1990; second issue in the series Routledge Library Editions: The Medieval World; Volume 4. London and New York: Routledge, 2018 (ISBN 978-0824057909)
- The Design of Bibliographies: Observations, References, and Examples. London: Mansell Publishers; Westport, CT: Greenwood, 1991 (ISBN 978-0313284250)
- Paper Terms: A Thesaurus for Use in Rare Book and Special Collections Cataloguing. Chicago: Association of College and Research Libraries, American Library Association, 1990; author/compiler; thesaurus issued by the Bibliographical Standards Committee (ISBN 0-8389-7427-9)
- The Anatomy of a Literary Hoax. New Castle, DE: Oak Knoll Books, 1994 (ISBN 978-0938768494)
- Fleuronologia. Northampton, Massachusetts: Gehenna Press, 1996
- Printing and the Mind of Merker: A Bibliographical Study. New York: The Grolier Club, 1997 (ISBN 9780910672191)
- The Magical Painted Papers of Eric Carle. Northampton, Massachusetts: Gehenna Press, 1997
- The Hand Made Papers of Japan. North Hills, PA: Bird & Bull Press, 2001
- Forty-Four Years of Bird & Bull: A Bibliography, 1958-2002. Compiled by Sidney E. Berger. North Hills, PA: Bird & Bull Press, 2002
- Karli Frigge’s Life in Marbling. North Hills, PA: Bird & Bull Press, 2004
- Edward Seymour and the Fancy Paper Company. New Castle, DE: Oak Knoll Press, 2006 (ISBN 9781584561897)
- [As editor and author of introduction] Marbled and Paste Papers: Rosamond Loring’s Recipe Book, Cambridge, MA: Houghton Library, Harvard University, 2007 (ISBN 9780976547259)
- Chiyogami Papers. North Hills, PA: Bird & Bull Press, 2011
- Rare Books and Special Collections. Chicago: Neal-Schuman, American Library Association, 2014; winner of the 2015 ABC Clio / American Library Association award for Best Book in Library Literature, 2015 (ISBN 978-1555709648)
- The Dictionary of the Book: A Glossary for Book Collectors, Booksellers, Librarians, and Others. Lanham: Rowman & Littlefield, 2016 (ISBN 9781442263406)
- The Book of Death. Waban, MA: Doe Press, 2017 (ISBN 9780998783604)
- [As editor] Josef Halfer and the Revival of the Art of Marbling Paper, by Richard J. Wolfe. New Castle, DE: Oak Knoll Press, 2018. (ISBN 9781584563778)

Since 2003, Berger has published about 100 scholarly articles, and he has been the “Decorated Paper” columnist for Hand Papermaking Newsletter for which publication he has written over 60 articles.

With his wife Michèle V. Cloonan he is the proprietor of the Doe Press, which has published fine-press books including: Thom Gunn. Lament. 1985; Ernest Kroll. Six Letters to An Apprentice. 1994; Donald Justice. Banjo Dog. 1995, and Michele V. Cloonan, The Invisible Presence of Gertrude Stiles, 2010.

Also with Michèle V. Cloonan, he amassed a collection of over 22,000 pieces of paper, now the Berger-Cloonan Collection of Decorated Paper at the Cushing Library, Texas A&M University.
