= Jean Rollin filmography =

Jean Rollin was a French director, producer, screenwriter, novelist and actor. In a career spanning over five decades, Rollin began as an actor and experimental filmmaker of short projects, before moving on to create mainstream films. His works remain notable for their unique cinematic style, mixing stunning visuals with a dream-like atmosphere; although the majority of his films fall within the fantastique or horror genres, many themes and subgenres are present, including, melodrama, eroticism, and adventure, and to a lesser extent, crime, gore, Satanism, and films which have depicted the subjects of mental illness and memory disorder, while his most recognisable work being the recurring theme of vampirism.

Throughout his career, most of Rollin's films were met with criticism and hostility, and due to negative response, he found it difficult to receive financial support for his intended projects, and as an alternative, turned to the pornographic industry, working under several pseudonyms, in order to raise the funds to produce mainstream films. In later years, Rollin's work as a filmmaker has become more appreciated, while his films are now considered cult classics, earning him the Lifetime Achievement Award at the Fantasia International Film Festival in 2007, for his contribution to fantastical cinema.

== Films ==
=== Main films ===
| Year | Film | | Credited as | | | Notes | Ref. |
| Year | Original title | English title | Director | Producer | Writer | Notes | Ref. |
|---|---|---|---|---|---|---|---|
| 1968 | Le viol du vampire | The Rape of the Vampire | Yes | Yes | Yes | (Note: Alternatively titled "The Queen of the Vampires") | |
| 1970 | La vampire nue | The Nude Vampire | Yes | | Yes | (Note: Alternatively titled "The Naked Vampire") | |
| 1971 | Le frisson des vampires | The Shiver of the Vampires | Yes | Yes | Yes | (Note: Literal English translation: "The Thrill of the Vampires". Alternatively titled "Sex and the Vampire" and "Strange Things Happen at Night") | |
| 1971 | Requiem pour un vampire | Requiem for a Vampire | Yes | | Yes | (Note: Alternatively titled "Caged Virgins" (North America) and "Virgins and the Vampires" (North America)) | |
| 1973 | La rose de fer | The Iron Rose | Yes | | Yes | (Note: French working title: "La Nuit du cimetière" (lit. "The Night of the Cemetery"). Alternatively titled: "The Crystal Rose") | |
| 1974 | Les démoniaques | The Demoniacs | Yes | | Yes | (Note: Alternatively titled: "Curse of the Living Dead" and "Les diablesses" (lit. "The She Devils")) | |
| 1975 | Lèvres de sang | Lips of Blood | Yes | | Yes | (Note: French working title: "Jennifer") | |
| 1978 | Les raisins de la mort | The Grapes of Death | Yes | | Yes | (Note: Alternatively titled: "Pesticide" (France)) | |
| 1979 | Fascination | Fascination | Yes | | Uncredited | (Note: Widely known by its original French title, "Fascination", in most countries.) | |
| 1980 | La nuit des traquées | The Night of the Hunted | Yes | | Yes | (Note: Literal English translation: "The Night of the Stalking") | |
| 1981 | Les paumées du petit matin | The Escapees | Yes | | Yes | (Note: Literal English translation: "The Dawns of the Early Morning". Alternatively titled: "The Runaways" and "Fuges mineures" (lit. "Runaway Minors")) | |
| 1982 | La morte vivante | The Living Dead Girl | Yes | | Yes | (Note: Literal English translation: "The Living Dead". Alternatively titled: "Lady Dracula" (West Germany) and "Zombie Queen" (Japan)) | |
| 1984 | Les trottoirs de Bangkok | The Sidewalks of Bangkok | Yes | | Uncredited | (Note: Alternatively titled: "Bangkok Interdit" (lit. "Bangkok Forbidden")) | |
| 1989 | Perdues dans New York (TV) | Lost in New York | Yes | | Yes | (Note: Television movie.) | |
| 1993 | Killing Car | Killing Car | Yes | | | (Note: French working title: "Femme Dangereuse" (lit. "Dangerous Woman"). Alternatively titled: "The Blood Red Car".) | |
| 1997 | Les deux orphelines vampires | The Two Orphan Vampires | Yes | | Yes | (Note: Alternatively titled "Сиротки-вампиры" (lit. "Vampire Orphans")) | |
| 2002 | La fiancée de Dracula | Dracula's Fiancee | Yes | | Yes | (Note: Alternatively titled: "Fiancee of Dracula" and "Le retour de Dracula" (lit. "The Return of Dracula").) | |
| 2007 | La nuit des horloges | The Night of the Clocks | Yes | | Yes | (Note: Alternatively titled: "La nuit transfiguree" (lit. "The Transfigured Night")) | |
| 2009 | Le masque de la Méduse | The Mask of Medusa | Yes | | Yes | (Note: Final film) | |

=== Other films ===
| Year | Film | Credited as | | Notes | Ref. |
| Year | Film | Director | Writer | Notes | Ref. |
|---|---|---|---|---|---|
| 1962 | Un cheval pour deux | Assistant | | (Note: lit. "A Horse for Two".) | |
| 1973 | La nuit des étoiles filantes | Additional | | (Note: Additional sequences, added in 1981. Known by its English title, "A Virgin Among the Living Dead".) | |
| 1980 | Mondo cannibale | | Uncredited | (Note: Alternative title: "White Cannibal Queen".) | |
| 1981 | Le lac des morts vivants | Yes | | (Note: Credited as J.A. Laser. Known in English as "Zombie Lake". lit. "The Lake of the Living Dead") | |
| 1985 | Ne prends pas les poulets pour des pigeons | Yes | | (Note: Credited as Michel Gentil. lit. "Don't take chickens for pigeons".) | |

=== Short films ===
| Year | Film | Credited as | | | | Notes | Ref. |
| Year | Film | Director | Producer | Writer | Editor | Notes | Ref. |
|---|---|---|---|---|---|---|---|
| 1957 | La guerre du silence | | | | Yes | (Note: Documentary. lit. "The War of Silence".) | |
| 1958 | Les mécaniciens de l'Armée de l'Air | | | | Yes | (Note: Documentary. lit. "Air Force mechanics".) | |
| 1958 | Les amours jaunes | Yes | | | | (Note: Known by its English title, "The Yellow Lovers", lit. "The Yellow Loves".) | |
| 1961 | Ciel de cuivre | Yes | | | | (Note: lit. "Copper Sky".) | |
| 1964 | Vivre en Espagne | Yes | | Yes | | (Note: Documentary. Known by its English title, "Life in Spain", lit. "Living in Spain".) | |
| 1965 | Le pays loin | Yes | | | | (Note: lit. "The Far Country".) | |
| 1966 | Tristesse des anthropophages | | Yes | | | (Note: lit. "Sadness of Cannibals".) | |
| 1967 | Faire quelque chose | | Yes | | | (Note: lit. "Do Something".) | |
| 1990 | La griffe d'Horus (TV) | Yes | | Yes | | (Note: Short TV movie. lit. "The Claws of Horus") | |
| 1991 | Et le temps s'en va... | | Executive | | | (Note: lit. "And Time is Running Out…".) | |
| 1991 | À la poursuite de Barbara... | Uncredited | | | | (Note: lit. "Chasing Barbara".) | |

=== Adult and pseudonym films ===
| Year | Film | Credited as | | | | Notes | Ref. |
| Year | Film | Director | Producer | Writer | Supervisor | Notes | Ref. |
|---|---|---|---|---|---|---|---|
| 1973 | Jeunes filles impudiques | Yes | | | | (Note: Credited as Michel Gentil. Known in English as "Schoolgirl Hitchhikers", lit. "Immodest Maidens". Also served as production manager credited as Jean Pierre Sammut.) | |
| 1974 | Tout le monde il en a deux | Yes | | Yes | | (Note: Credited as Michel Gentil. Known in English as "Fly Me the French Way", lit. "Everyone Has Two". Alternative title: "Bacchanales Sexuelles".) | |
| 1975 | Phantasmes | Yes | | Yes | | (Note: Known in English as "Once Upon a Virgin", lit. "Phantasms". Alternative titles: "Les fantasmes d'Isabelle" (lit. "Isabelle's Fantasies"), "Phantasme pornographique" (lit. "Pornographic Fantasy") and "The Seduction of Amy" (North America).) | |
| 1976 | Douces pénétrations | Yes | | Yes | | (Note: Credited as Michel Gentil. lit. "Sweet Petetrations".) | |
| 1976 | Amours collectives | | | Yes | | (Note: lit. "Collective Loves".) | |
| 1976 | Suce-moi vampire | Yes | | | | (Note: Credited as Michel Gand. lit. "Suck Me Vampire". Hardcore version of "Lèvres de sang".) | |
| 1976 | La comtesse Ixe | Yes | | | | (Note: Credited as Michel Gentil. Known in English as "Countess X", lit. "The Countess Ixe".) | |
| 1976 | Apothéose porno | | | | Yes | (Note: lit. "Porn Apotheosis") | |
| 1977 | Hard Penetration | Yes | | Yes | | (Note: Credited as Michel Gentil.) | |
| 1977 | Vibrations sexuelles | Yes | | | | (Note: Credited as Michel Gentil. lit. "Sexual Vibrations".) | |
| 1977 | Saute-moi dessus | Yes | | Yes | | (Note: Credited as Michel Gentil. lit. "Jump on Me".) | |
| 1977 | Positions danoises | Yes | Yes | Yes | | (Note: Credited as Michel Gentil. lit. "Danish Positions".) | |
| 1978 | Disco Sex | Yes | | Uncredited | | (Note: Credited as Robert Xavier.) | |
| 1978 | Remplissez-moi... les 3 trous | Yes | Yes | Yes | | (Note: Credited as Robert Xavier. lit. "Fill Me… All 3 Holes".) | |
| 1978 | Petites pensionnaires impudiques | Yes | | | | (Note: Credited as Michel Gentil. lit. "Immodest Little Boarders".) | |
| 1978 | Lèvres entrouvertes | Yes | | | | (Note: Credited as Michel Gentil. lit. "Parted Lips".) | |
| 1978 | Hyperpénétrations | Yes | Yes | Yes | | (Note: Credited as Robert Xavier.) | |
| 1979 | Gamines en chaleur | Yes | | | | (Note: Credited as Robert Xavier. lit. "Girls in Heat".) | |
| 1979 | Bouches lascives et pornos | Yes | | Yes | | (Note: Credited as Robert Xavier. lit. "Lascivious mouths and porn".) | |
| 1979 | Pénétrations vicieuses | Yes | | | | (Note: Credited as Michel Gentil. lit. "Vicious Penetrations".) | |
| 1979 | Jeux d'adultes pour gamines expertes | | Yes | | | (Note: lit. "Adult Games for Expert Kids". Alternative title: "Teenage Love".) | |
| 1979 | Entrez vite... vite, je mouille! | | Yes | | | (Note: lit. "Come in quickly... quickly, I'm wet!".) | |
| 1980 | Minouche, fillette insatiable | | Yes | | | (Note: lit. "Minouche, Insatiable Girl". Alternative title: "Unlimited Girls".) | |
| 1982 | Rêves de sexes | Yes | | | | (Note: Credited as René Xavier. lit. "Sex Dreams".) | |
| 1983 | Folies anales | Yes | | | | (Note: Credited as Robert Xavier. lit. "Anal Madness".) | |
| 1984 | Sodomanie | Yes | | Yes | | (Note: Credited as Robert Xavier. lit. "Sodomy".) | |
| 1988 | Emmanuelle 6 | Uncredited | | | | (Note: Alternative titles: "Emmanuelle VI: Wild Paradise" (North America).) | |
| 1994 | Le parfum de Mathilde (TV) | Uncredited | | Yes | | (Note: Television movie. lit. "Mathilde's perfume") | |

=== Actor ===
| Year | Film | Role | Notes | Ref. |
|---|---|---|---|---|
| 1956 | Crime et châtiment | Le prêtre chantant (uncredited) | (Note: lit. Crime and Punishment) | |
| 1966 | Tristesse des anthropophages | Un client du restaurant scatophage (uncredited) | (Note: See note af) | |
| 1968 | Le viol du vampire | Un villageois (uncredited) | (Note: See note a) | |
| 1968 | La femme bourreau | Un flic | (Note: Known by its English title, "A Woman Kills", lit. The Executioner Woman) | |
| 1971 | La secte du diable | Le prêtre sataniste | (Note: lit. The Devil's Sect) | |
| 1973 | La rose de fer | Le rôdeur | (Note: See note e) | |
| 1973 | Jeunes filles impudiques | Man in red turtleneck (uncredited) | (Note: See note ak) | |
| 1973 | Le sourire vertical | Undisclosed role | (Note: lit. The Vertical Smile) | |
| 1974 | Les démoniaques | Le marin qui danse avec le travesti (uncredited) | (Note: See note f) | |
| 1975 | Lèvres de sang | Le gardien du cimetière (uncredited) | (Note: See note g) | |
| 1975 | Phantasmes | L'agresseur | (Note: See note am) | |
| 1976 | Douces pénétrations | Le chef cuisinier (uncredited) | (Note: See note an) | |
| 1976 | Amours collectives | Mike Gentle - the vampire | (Note: See note ao) | |
| 1976 | Suce-moi vampire | Un chasseur | (Note: See note ap) | |
| 1977 | Saute-moi dessus | Invité fin | (Note: See note au) | |
| 1977 | Les Queutardes | Undisclosed role | (Note: lit. "The Queutards") | |
| 1978 | Les raisins de la mort | Le viticulteur (uncredited) | (Note: See note h) | |
| 1978 | Disco Sex | Sound Engineer | (Note: See note aw) | |
| 1978 | Remplissez-moi... les 3 trous | Guest (uncredited) | (Note: See note ax) | |
| 1978 | Lèvres gloutonnes | Undisclosed role | (Note: lit. "Gluttonous Lips") | |
| 1978 | Hyperpénétrations | Invité | (Note: See note ba) | |
| 1979 | Gamines en chaleur | Un convive (uncredited) | (Note: See note bb) | |
| 1979 | Entrez vite... vite, je mouille! | Undisclosed role | (Note: See note bf. Credited as Michel Gentil in acting role) | |
| 1980 | Clinique pour soins très spéciaux | Undisclosed role | (Note: lit. "Clinic for Very Special Care". Known in English as "Anal Hospital") | |
| 1980 | La nuit des traquées | Un infirmier tueur (uncredited) | (Note: See note j) | |
| 1981 | Le lac des morts vivants | Stiltz | (Note: See note bh) | |
| 1981 | Les paumées du petit matin | Un client au Vénus club (uncredited) | (Note: See note k) | |
| 1982 | La morte vivante | Salesman (uncredited) | (Note: See note l) | |
| 1984 | Les trottoirs de Bangkok | Killer in Opening Scene / Narrator (uncredited) | (Note: See note m) | |
| 1985 | Sanguine | L'éditeur | (Note: Short film) | |
| 1985 | Haemophilia | Police Inspector | | |
| ???? | Le prince des vampires | Undisclosed role | (Note: Short film. Directed by Thierry Racine.) | |
| 1991 | À la poursuite de Barbara... | Undisclosed role | (Note: See note ac) | |
| 1992 | Alien Platoon | Maj. Taylor | (Note: Direct-to-video) | |
| 1992 | Trepanator | Dr. Roll | (Note: Direct-to-video) | |
| 1993 | Dinosaur from the Deep | Professeur Nolan | (Note: Direct-to-video) | |
| 1993 | Killing Car | Bandaged Man | (Note: See note o. Credited as Michel Gentil in acting role.) | |
| 1997 | Marquis de Slime | Homme du gouvernement | (Note: Short film) | |
| 2007 | Life Like | The Director | (Note: Short film) | |
| 2009 | Le masque de la Méduse | L'homme qui enterre la tête | (Note: See note s) | |

=== Other works ===
- Drôles d'histoires (TV series, writer, episode: "Cabinet particulier", 1989)

=== Unfinished works ===
- L'itinéraire marin (1963, director and writer)
- Beastiality (1985), a werewolf film which was set to star Brigitte Lahaie.
- Détectives de charme (1991) (Note: lit. Charming Detectives)
- Le retour de Dracula (1992), a proposed TV series which was set to air on France 3. (Note: lit. The Return of Dracula)

== Recurring collaborators ==
| Work Actor | 1968 | 1970 | 1970 | 1971 | 1973 | 1974 | 1975 | 1978 | 1979 | 1980 | 1981 | 1982 | 1984 | 1989 | 1993 | 1997 | 2002 | 2007 | 2009 |
| Work Actor | Le viol du vampire | La vampire nue | Le frisson des vampires | Requiem pour un vampire | La rose de fer | Les démoniaques | Lèvres de sang | Les raisins de la mort | Fascination | La nuit des traquées | Les paumées du petit matin | La morte viviante | Les trottoirs de Bangkok | Perdues dans New York | Killing Car | Les deux orphelines vampires | La fiancée de Dracula | La nuit des horloges | Le masque de la Méduse |
| Jean-Loup Philippe | ✓ | | | | | | ✓ | | | | ✓ | | | | ✓ | | | ✓ | |
| Olivier Rollin | ✓ | ✓ | | | | | | ✓ | | | | | ✓ | | | | | | |
| Paul Bisciglia | | ✓ | | ✓ | | ✓ | ✓ | ✓ | | | | | | | | | | | |
| Catherine Castel | | ✓ | | | | | ✓ | | | | | | | | | | ✓ | ✓ | |
| Marie-Pierre Castel | | ✓ | ✓ | ✓ | | | ✓ | ✓ | | | | | | | | | | | |
| Nathalie Perrey | | ✓ | | | ✓ | | ✓ | | | ✓ | ✓ | | | ✓ | | ✓ | ✓ | ✓ | |
| Dominique | | | ✓ | ✓ | | | | | | | | | | | | | | ✓ | |
| Louise Dhour | | | | ✓ | | ✓ | | | | | ✓ | | | | | | | | |
| Mireille Dargent | | | | ✓ | ✓ | ✓ | ✓ | | | | | | | | | | | | |
| Jean-Pierre Bouyxou | | | | | | ✓ | | ✓ | | | | ✓ | ✓ | | ✓ | ✓ | | | ✓ |
| Brigitte Lahaie | | | | | | | | ✓ | ✓ | ✓ | ✓ | | | | | ✓ | ✓ | | |
| Jean Hérel | | | | | | | | | | ✓ | ✓ | ✓ | | | | | | | |
| Françoise Blanchard | | | | | | | | | | | | ✓ | ✓ | | | | | ✓ | |
| Marie-Laurence | | | | | | | | | | | | | | ✓ | | ✓ | ✓ | | |
| Sabine Lenoël | | | | | | | | | | | | | | | | | ✓ | ✓ | ✓ |

Note: This list includes actors who have appeared in three or more of Jean Rollin's mainstream works.
