= List of French films of 1975 =

A list of films produced in France in 1975.

== Films ==
Title	Director	Cast	Genre	Notes
7 morts sur ordonnance	Jacques Rouffio	Michel Piccoli, Gérard Depardieu, Jane Birkin,		French-West German-Spanish co-production
Aloïse	Liliane de Kermadec	Delphine Seyrig, Isabelle Huppert, Michel Lonsdale	Drama	
La Bête	Walerian Borowczyk	Sirpa Lane, Lisbeth Hummel, Elizabeth Kaza	Fantasy	
Beyond Fear	Yannick Andréi	Michel Bouquet, Michel Constantin, Marilù Tolo		French-Italian co-production
Black Moon	Louis Malle	Cathryn Harrison, Therese Giehse, Joe Dallesandro	Avant-garde, fantasy, science fiction	
Bons Baisers de Hong Kong	Yvan Chiffre	Les Charlots, Mickey Rooney	Comedy	
La Chair de l'orchidée	Patrice Chéreau	Charlotte Rampling, Bruno Cremer, Simone Signoret	Thriller	
Le Chat et la souris	Claude Lelouch	Michèle Morgan, Serge Reggiani, Philippe Léotard		
Cher Victor	Robin Davis	Bernard Blier, Jacques Dufilho, Alida Valli	Drama	
Chobizenesse	Jean Yanne	Jean Yanne	Musical Comedy	
The Common Man	Yves Boisset	Jean Carmet, Pierre Tornade, Jean Bouise	Drama	
Cousin Cousine	Jean-Charles Tacchella	Marie-Christine Barrault, Victor Lanoux, Marie-France Pisier	Comedy, romance	
Emmanuelle 2	Francis Giacobetti	Sylvia Kristel, Umberto Orsini, Catherine Rivet	Adult	
Flic Story	Jacques Deray	Alain Delon, Jean-Louis Trintignant, Renato Salvatori		French-Italian co-production
The French Detective	Pierre Grainier-Deferre	Lino Ventura, Patrick Dewaere, Victor Lanoux		
Les Galettes de Pont-Aven	Joel Seria	Jean-Pierre Marielle, Bernard Fresson, Jeanne Goupil	Comedy	French–Italian co-production
A Genius, Two Partners and a Dupe	Damiano Damiani	Terence Hill, Miou-Miou, Patrick McGoohan	Western	Italian–French–West German co-production
Le Gitan	José Giovanni	Alain Delon, Paul Meurisse, Annie Girardot		French-Italian co-production
Incorrigible	Philippe de Broca	Jean-Paul Belmondo, Geneviève Bujold, Julien Guiomar	Comedy	
India Song	Marguerite Duras	Delphine Seyrig, Michel Lonsdale, Mathieu Carrière	Avant-garde	
Innocents with Dirty Hands	Claude Chabrol	Romy Schneider, Rod Steiger	Crime	French–Italian–West German co-production
Jacques Brel Is Alive and Well and Living in Paris	Denis Héroux	Mort Shuman, Elly Stone, Joe Masiell		Canadian-French co-production
Jeanne Dielman, 23 quai du Commerce, 1080 Bruxelles	Chantal Akerman	Delphine Seyrig, Jan Decorte, Chantal Akerman	Avant-garde	Belgian–French co-production
L'ibis rouge	Jean-Pierre Mocky	Michel Simon, Michel Serrault	Crime comedy	
Let Joy Reign Supreme	Bertrand Tavernier	Philippe Noiret, Jean Rochefort, Jean-Pierre Marielle	Historical film	
Lily, aime-moi	Maurice Dugowson	Rufus, Jean-Michel Folon, Patrick Dewaere	Drama	
Lips of Blood	Jean Rollin	Jean-Loup Philippe, Annie Belle, Nathalie Perrey		
Malicious Pleasure	Bernard Toublanc-Michel	Jacques Weber, Claude Jade, Anny Duperey	Thriller	
Numéro Deux	Jean-Luc Godard	Sandrine Battistella, Pierre Oudrey, Alexandre Rignault	Avant-garde film	
Pas de problème!	Georges Lautner	Miou-Miou, Jean Lefebvre, Bernard Ménez		
The Night Caller	Henri Verneuil	Jean-Paul Belmondo, Charles Denner, Adalberto Maria Merli	Thriller	French–Italian co-production
The Pink Telephone	Édouard Molinaro	Mireille Darc, Pierre Mondy, Michael Lonsdale	Comedy drama	
Playing with Fire	Alain Robbe-Grillet	Jean-Louis Trintignant, Philippe Noiret, Anicée Alvina	Avant-garde, comedy, mystery	
Pleasure Party	Claude Chabrol	Paul Gégauff, Danielle Gégauff, Clemence Gégauff	Drama	French–Italian co-production
Quand la ville s'éveille	Pierre Grasset	Raymond Pellegrin, Marc Porel, Neda arneric		
Raging Fists	Éric Le Hung	Tony Gatlif, Marie-Georges Pascal, Philippe Lavot	Crime	
Salò, or the 120 Days of Sodom	Pier Paolo Pasolini	Paolo Bonacelli, Giorgio Cataldi, Umberto Paolo		Italian–French co-production
Le Sauvage	Jean-Paul Rappeneau	Yves Montand, Catherine Deneuve, Luigi Vannucchi	Adventure, comedy	French–Italian co-production
Section spéciale	Costa-Gavras	Louis Seigner, Michel Lonsdale, François Maistre	Drama	French–Italian–West German co-production
Le Sexe qui parle	Claude Mulot		Adult	
The Story of Adele H.	François Truffaut	Isabelle Adjani, Bruce Robinson, Sylvia Marriott	Drama	
Story of O	Just Jaeckin	Corinne Cléry, Udo Kier, Anthony Steel	Drama	
Tarzoon: Shame of the Jungle	Boris Szulzinger, Michel Gast, Picha		Animated film, adventure, comedy	Belgian–French co-production
That Most Important Thing: Love	Andrzej Żuławski	Romy Schneider, Fabio Testi Jacques Dutronc	Romance, drama	French–Italian–West German co-production
The Track	Serge Leroy	Mimsy Farmer, Jean-Pierre Marielle, Jean-Luc Bideau	Thriller	
Le vieux fusil	Robert Enrico	Philippe Noiret, Romy Schneider	Drama	
Wanted: Babysitter	René Clément	Maria Schneider, Sydne Rome, Vic Morrow, Robert Vaughn	Thriller	French–Italian–West German co-production
The Wild Goose Chase	Claude Zidi	Pierre Richard, Jane Birkin	Comedy	
Zorro	Duccio Tessari	Alain Delon, Stanley Baker, Moustache	Adventure	Italian–French co-production

== See also ==
- 1975 in France
