= Erotic horror =

Subgenre of horror fiction

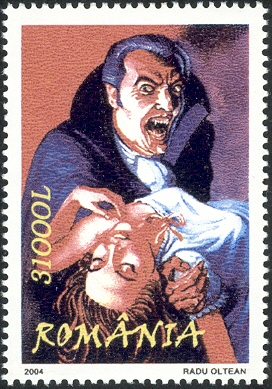
Dracula by Bram Stoker is an early example of erotic horror fiction

Erotic horror, alternately called horror erotica or dark erotica, is a genre of fiction that explores the melding of sensual or sexual imagery with horrific elements for the purpose of sexual arousal. Horror fiction of this type can be found throughout all different cultures and time periods, today commonly found in literature, film and video games.

== In film ==
Erotic horror has had influences on Spanish, French, and American horror films. The works of Jean Rollin, such as Le Viol du Vampire and Fascination, are considered quintessential erotic horror films, blending deeply sexual imagery with gore. American cinema has also featured notable erotic horror film franchises, such as Candyman. An example of a British erotic horror film series is Hellraiser. Alien features heavy erotic imagery, with the design of the Xenomorph by H. R. Giger featuring both phallic and yonic imagery, intended to symbolize the horrifying nature of rape, as well as aspects of pregnancy.

Body horror films, such as Crimes of the Future and Titane, have been likened to erotic horror.

== Women's erotic horror ==
Erotic horror especially that of dark romance has a large female audience, however the exploration of taboo topics of sex in horror is controversial in feminists circles. Many feminists have been hesitant to accept erotic horror, as both the erotic and horror have been criticized for their appeal to the male gaze. Pornography and horror media often depict coercion of women to perform monstrous, incestuous and sexual acts, thus some deem these forms of erotic horror to not be transgressive, empowering or feminist. Some contemporary women's horror, however, celebrates the erotic and encourages combining horror with eroticism while still centering self-determination and sexual choice.

Writers of feminist erotic horror have used their works to express themselves as both a subject and object within a fantasy context. Many feminist erotic horror pieces involve romantic relationships with a monster, such as vampires, werewolves, and/or the reworking of existing fairytales in order for female protagonists to take control of their own sexual fate.

== Monster erotica ==
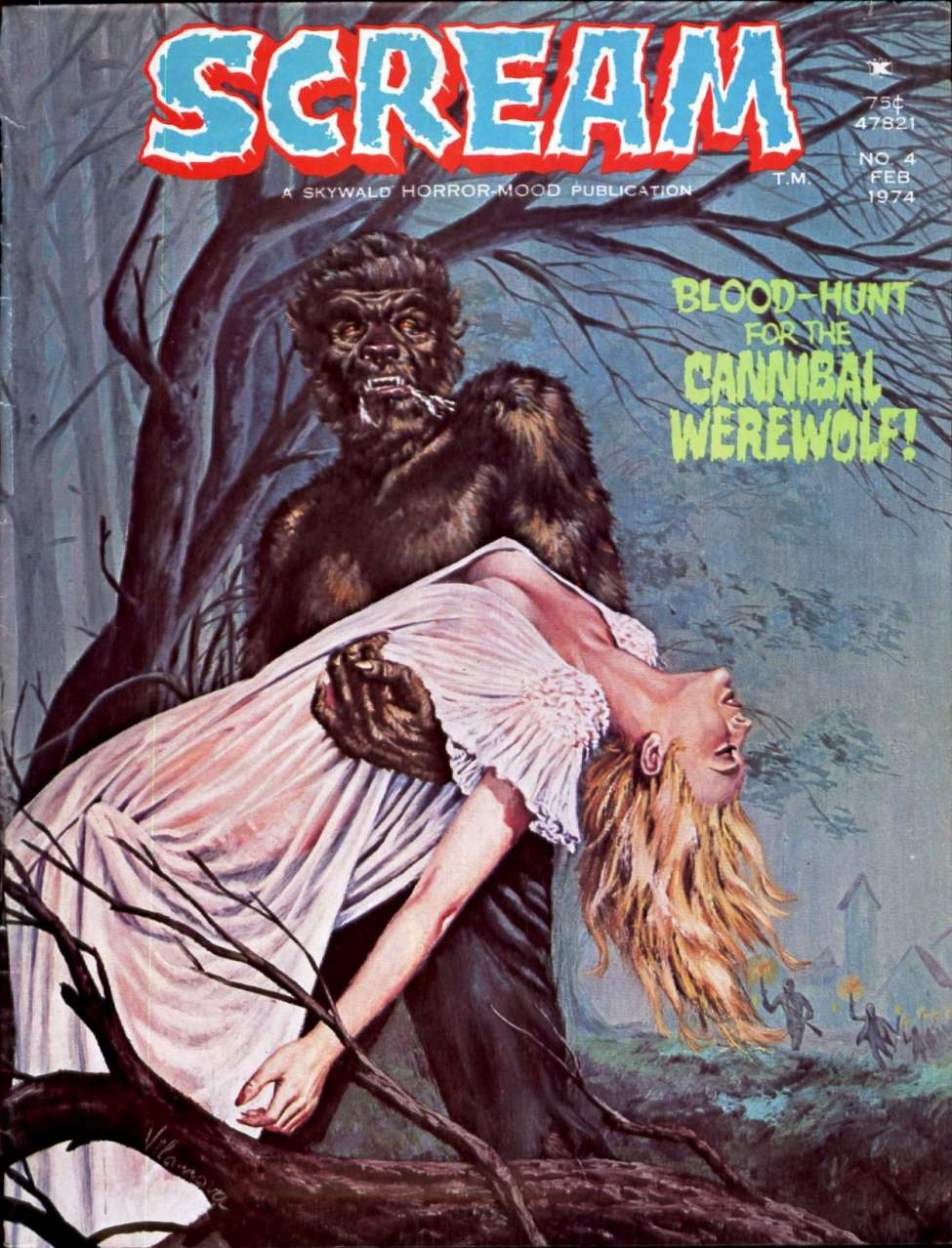
The cover of Scream magazine depicting a werewolf holding a woman

Monster erotica, also known as monster porn, is a genre of erotic art or pornography that features sexual encounters between humans and monsters. The monsters present in this genre are often are pre-existing folkloric or mythical creatures, that can range form more animalistic beasts, such dragons and werewolves to more humanoid, such as vampires, and zombies. The monsters present are often intelligent and sapient; that being said, rape often takes place against humans in the genre.

The taboo nature of this genre has resulted in the removal of some monster erotica works for its depictions of rape, incest, and bestiality. Such as in 2013 when various online retailers removed hundreds of self-published monster erotica books from their websites. Monster erotica also appears in Japanese media, with examples such as tentacle hentai being popular.

== Vampire erotica ==
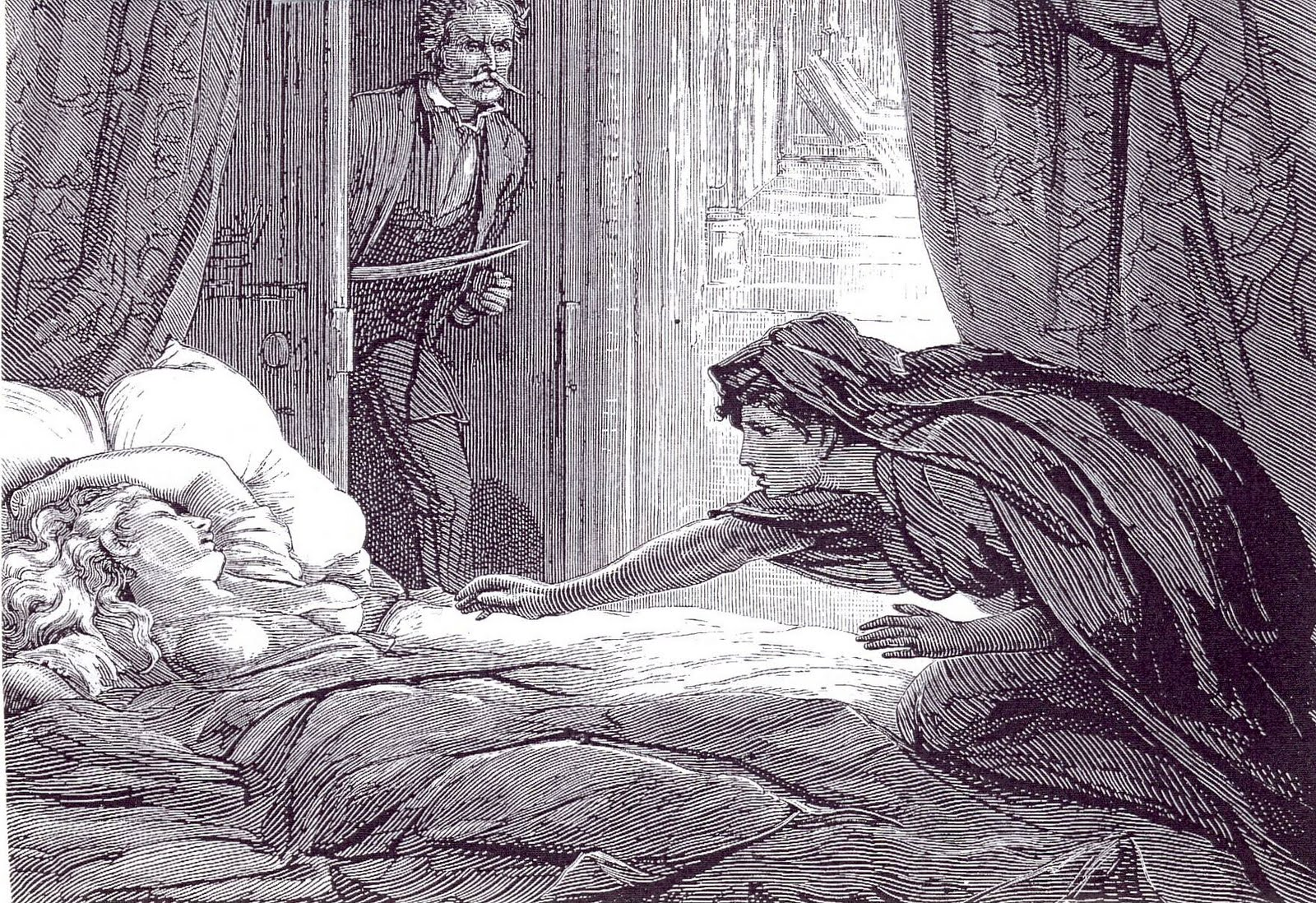
Carmilla by Sheridan Le Fanu is an example of lesbian vampire erotic horror

Vampires have been known to be icons of erotic horror since conception, especially Bram Stoker’s Dracula which includes overt female sexuality and voyeurism. In different iterations of vampire stories, the vampire is constantly described as attractive and sexually alluring to humans. Vampire bites and feeding are often described as pleasurable and sexual, as Violet Fenn notes in her analysis of vampire feeding within Dracula: "blood and lust are as one." Killing a vampire has also been analyzed as being sexually charged as it requires impalement or penetration by a stake to the heart. Andrew Green notes in his analysis that the language used by Stoker for the death of the vampire Lucy Westenra is reminiscent of the language used to describe orgasms.

Although the vampire is traditionally understood as a masculine devourer of women, modern erotic stories featuring women vampires are often transgressive in nature – women in these stories do not conform to expectations about marriage, sexual freedom, or heterosexual desire – and may be understood as altogether feminist. Several of these stories feature the lesbian vampire, a trope in which vampirism and lesbian identity are connected. In the 1970s, erotic vampire lesbian films (like Twins of Evil by John Hough, 1971) projected lesbian identity and vampirism as intertwined, and audiences viewed both as horrifying elements. Erotic vampire lesbian horror is a diverse genre, and lesbian identities are constructed in several different ways: As members of a shared sisterhood, sexually violent, sadomasochistic, or supporting butch and femme distinctions. More generally, although early works were limiting, modern lesbian erotic horror transgresses popular conceptions of what appropriate sexual desire can look like and celebrates difference.

== Ero guro ==
Ero guro (エログロ), also known as just guro, is a Japanese genre of erotic art that focuses on a mix of eroticism with grotesque and horror elements. Originating from the ero guro nansensu subculture of the Shōwa era, it first gained prominence in the popular literature of Japan in the 1920s and 1930s, and regularly features violent scenes such as dismemberment, disembowelment, eyeball gore, and exploding wombs. Following the Sada Abe Incident of 1936, in which a woman strangled and castrated her lover for sexual pleasure, ero guro media faced censorship. Such erotica made a reemergence in the postwar period, especially in manga. Later sub genres of hentai would be influenced by ero guro, including tentacle hentai. In the 21st century, guro hentai has gained popularity in the United States.

== See also ==
- Erotic thriller
- LGBTQ themes in horror fiction
- Paranormal romance
- Teratophilia
- Taboo
