= Lost in New York =

Lost in New York may refer to:

- Perdues dans New York, a 1989 French film directed by Jean Rollin and titled in English as Lost In New York
- Home Alone 2: Lost in New York, a 1992 film starring Macaulay Culkin
