= Escapee =

Escapee or Escapees may refer to:

- A person who has escaped from imprisonment or confinement, particularly:
  - A fugitive
  - A person who has made a prison escape
  - A defector from an authoritarian regime
- "Escapee", a song from the 2011 Architecture in Helsinki album, Moment Bends
- The Escapees, alternate title of the 1981 film, Les Paumées du Petit Matin
- OnEscapee, 1997 action-adventure video game
