= Claudine Beccarie =

French pornographic actress

- Born: 14 June 1945 (age 81); Créteil, Val-de-Marne, France
- Occupation: Pornographic actress
- Years active: 1972–1982

Claudine Beccarie ([klodin bɛkaʁi]; born 14 June 1945) is a French pornographic actress of the 1970s. She has been called "the French Linda Lovelace" and she was described by The New York Times as being "one of France's most successful pornography performers."

== Career ==
Beccarie was working as an exotic dancer when Sylvia Bourdon introduced her to Lasse Braun. Bourdon had told Beccarie about Braun's pornographic films. Beccarie traveled to Breda, Netherlands with Bourdon to meet Braun. In 1972, she starred her first film, an 8 mm loop of her performing with Braun. The film was released in the Netherlands. Beccarie and Bourdon came up with the concept for Cake Orgy, Braun's iconic 1973 film. Beccarie was one of the stars of the film, which ended with her urinating on her fellow cast members. Cake Orgy was banned in the United States and Reuben Sturman was charged, and later acquitted, on obscenity charges.

In 1975, she starred in the documentary Exhibition, which contained several staged hardcore scenes and gained the title "first French porn star".

In 1976, she appeared in the role of Claudine in the original Lèvres de sang and starred as Jennifer the remake of the film. Months later, she quit hardcore pornography. From the late 1970s until the 1980s, Beccarie appeared in several Nazi exploitation films.

== Views on sexuality and pornography ==
Beccarie identified as sexually liberated. In a 1975 interview with Cinema X, she shared "I'm not a lesbian. Nor bisexual. I believe in men. Sexually liberated is what I am!"
