= Le masque de la Méduse =

- Original poster
- Directed by: Jean Rollin
- Written by: Jean Rollin
- Starring: Simone Rollin; Sabine Lenoël; Marlène Delcambre; Juliette Moreau; Delphine Montoban
- Cinematography: Benoit Torti
- Edited by: Janette Kronegger
- Music by: Philippe D'Aram
- Distributed by: Insolence Productions; Les Films ABC
- Release date: 19 November 2009
- Running time: 75 minutes
- Country: France
- Language: French
- Budget: €150,000

Le masque de la Méduse (English: The Mask of Medusa) is a 2009 fantasy horror film directed by Jean Rollin. The film is a modern-day telling of the Greek mythological tale of the Gorgon and was inspired by the 1964 classic Hammer Horror film of the same name and the 1981 cult classic Clash of the Titans. It was Rollin's final film, as the director died in 2010.

== Cast ==
- Simone Rollin as la Méduse
- Sabine Lenoël as Euryale
- Marlène Delcambre as Sthéno
- Juliette Moreau as Juliette
- Delphine Montoban as Cornelius
- Jean-Pierre Bouyxou as le gardien
- Bernard Charnacé as le collectionneur
- Agnès Pierron as la colleuse d'affiche au Grand-Guignol
- Gabrielle Rollin as la petite contrebassiste
- Jean Rollin as l'homme qui enterre la tête
- Thomas Smith as Thomas

== Production ==
It was thought that Rollin's 2007 film La nuit des horloges was the final film of his career, as he had mentioned in the past. However, in 2009, Rollin began preparation foe Le masque de la Méduse. Rollin originally directed the film as a one-hour short, which was screened at the Cinémathèque de Toulouse, but after the release, Rollin decided to add 20 minutes of additional scenes and then cut the film into two distinct parts, as he did with his first feature, Le Viol du Vampire. The film was shot on location at the Golden Gate Aquarium and Père Lachaise Cemetery, as well as on stage at the Theatre du Grande Guignol, which is where the longest part of the film takes place. It was shot on HD video on a low budget of €150,000. Before the release, it was transferred to 35mm film.

== Release ==
The film was not released theatrically, although it premiered on 19 November 2009 at the 11th edition of the Extreme Cinema Film Festival at the Cinémathèque de Toulouse. As part of "An Evening with Jean Rollin", it was shown as a double feature with Rollin's 2007 film La nuit des horloges.

== Home media ==
No official DVD was released, although for a limited time, a DVD of La masque de la Méduse was included with the first 150 copies of Rollin's book Jean Rollin: Écrits complets Volume 1.
