= The Grapes of Death =

- Original theatrical poster
- French: Les raisins de la mort
- Directed by: Jean Rollin
- Written by: Jean-Pierre Bouyxou; Christian Meunier; Jean Rollin
- Produced by: Christian Ruh
- Starring: Marie-Georges Pascal; Félix Marten; Serge Marquand
- Edited by: Christian Stoianovich; Dominique Saintcyr
- Music by: Philippe Bissmann
- Distributed by: Rush Distribution
- Release date: 5 July 1978
- Running time: 90 minutes
- Country: France
- Language: French

The Grapes of Death (French: Les raisins de la mort, also known as Pesticide) is a 1978 French horror film directed by Jean Rollin and starring Marie-Georges Pascal, Félix Marten, and Serge Marquand. It centres on a young woman who becomes trapped in a village where a dangerous pesticide has turned the residents into aggressive zombies.

== Plot ==
At the Roublès winemaking vineyard, the workers spray the fields with pesticides. When one of the workers becomes ill, complaining of a pain in his neck, his boss insists it's just a minor injury and tells him to go back to work.

Élizabeth is travelling by train to Roublès to live with Michel, her fiancé and the owner of the vineyard, and makes a friend with Brigitte, a woman on the train. Brigitte excuses herself to visit the restroom and doesn't return for a long time; then the vineyard worker comes aboard, encounters Brigitte, and a bit later joins Élizabeth in her compartment. In time, the man's neck suddenly grows an ulcer which starts oozing blood. Panicked, Élizabeth escapes him, stumbling upon Brigitte's corpse on the way.

Leaving the train, Élizabeth flees to a nearby village for help. A man named Pierre and his daughter Antoinette take her in, but react coldly to her tale. Élizabeth panics when she sees Pierre's arms disfigured by infection, but Antoinette holds her back, telling her to get upstairs to take a rest. When Élizabeth enters the bedroom and discovers a woman whose throat has been cut, Antoinette explains that the dead woman is her mother, and that her father killed her because he's become insane. Élizabeth and Antoinette try to leave the house, but Pierre, now featuring the same facial ulcers as the vineyard worker, catches them and rips open his daughter's blouse, revealing similar ulcers on her body. He kills Antoinette with a pitchfork, but Élizabeth flees and takes Pierre's car. When he gets in front of it and begs her to kill him, she runs him over and drives off.

Élizabeth travels further into the area to look for help and is approached by a man whose head is covered with ulcers and who is asking for help. When the pain from the infection makes him smash the car's window, the panicked Élizabeth shoots him with a revolver taken from the glove compartment. She comes across a blind girl named Lucie, who is searching for her caregiver, Lucas. While helping her, Élizabeth comes upon more bodies covered with the same strange ulcers strewn all over the village, while others are stumbling around like zombies, driven into murderous insanity by the infection. Élizabeth declines to tell Lucie, who runs off on her own and is killed and decapitated by Lucas, who has also been infected.

As the infected chase her, a blonde woman rescues Élizabeth. This woman has been trapped in a house for a few days, so she and Élizabeth try to get out and run, but the woman suddenly grabs Élizabeth and leaves her to the infected. Two men, Paul and Lucien, show up and start killing the infected. They encounter the blonde, who convinces them that she is not infected by briefly disrobing, and they tell her to wait by their truck. Escaping her assailants, Élizabeth reaches the truck, where she and the woman get into a fight. Élizabeth clubs her with a torch, revealing previously hidden infection boils on the woman's face. The woman then tosses the torch into an open dynamite crate on the truck, blowing the car up and killing her.

While Élizabeth, Paul and Lucien leave the village on foot, they begin to deduce that the infestation happened just after a wine festival on the Sunday before. Élizabeth suggests seeking out her fiancé for answers, and so the three proceed to the vineyard. Finding it apparently abandoned, Paul and Lucien sit down for a meal after learning from a phone call that the authorities are aware of the infection. Restless, Élizabeth searches the grounds and finds Michel, also infected but still lucid. He reveals that he invented the pesticide which tainted the wine that started this baleful infection, which spread so quickly because he had illegally employed immigrants as cheap labor, which prevented him from notifying the police.

Despite Michel's urgings that she stay away, Élizabeth embraces him. When Paul comes looking for her and discovers the two, Michel, unwilling to become insane, leaps at Paul, compelling the latter to shoot him. Now apparently infected herself, Élizabeth picks up Paul's gun and shoots him, then ambushes and kills Lucien when he comes looking for them. The film ends with Élizabeth allowing Michel's blood to drip on her face from the loft above.

== Cast ==
- Marie-Georges Pascal as Élizabeth
- Félix Marten as Paul (credited as Felix Marten)
- Serge Marquand as Lucien
- Mirella Rancelot as Lucie
- Patrice Valota as Pierre
- Patricia Cartier as Antoinette
- Michel Herval as Michel
- Paul Bisciglia as Lucas
- Brigitte Lahaie as Tall Blonde Woman (credited as Brigitte Lahaye)
- Olivier Rollin as Undead Who Smashes his Head
- Françoise Pascal as Train Passenger
- Evelyne Thomas as Brigitte
- Jean-Pierre Bouyxou as Undead with Scythe
- Jean Rollin as Man in Vineyard (uncredited)

== Release ==
Les raisins de la mort was released theatrically in France on 5 July 1978 by Rush Distribution.

=== Home media ===
Les raisins de la mort was first made available on DVD in the United States via Synapse Films on 25 April 2002; this special edition release preserved its original aspect ratio of 1.66:1. It was released again in the United States, by Redemption Films, on 20 May 2008. Both releases of the film in the US were uncut. In the United Kingdom, the film was released on DVD by Redemption Films on 25 April 2005, also in its original aspect ratio of 1.66:1.

Redemption released the film for the first time on Blu-ray in the United States and Canada on 25 April 2013. A 4K UHD Blu-ray edition was released in North America and the UK by Powerhouse Films on 28 April 2026.
