= La nuit des horloges =

- Directed by: Jean Rollin
- Written by: Jean Rollin
- Produced by: Jacques Orth
- Starring: Ovidie; Françoise Blanchard; Dominique; Maurice Lemaître; Nathalie Perrey; Jean-Loup Philippe
- Cinematography: Norbert Marfaing-Sintes
- Distributed by: Avia Films, Les Films ABC
- Release date: 16 July 2007
- Running time: 90 minutes
- Country: France
- Language: French

La nuit des horloges (English: The Night of the Clocks or Night Clocks) is a 2007 French fantasy film directed by Jean Rollin. The film stars the French writer and former pornographic actress Ovidie, with others who have appeared in many of Rollin's early works - Françoise Blanchard, Dominique, Nathalie Perrey and Jean-Loup Philippe. His penultimate film, it marks forty years of Rollin's career and pays homage to many of his earlier film works and serves as a thank you to his many loyal fans.

== Plot ==
A young woman named Isabelle has recently inherited a country mansion from her late uncle, writer, and filmmaker, Jean Michel. Upon her arrival, Isabelle goes to visit her uncle's grave at Père Lachaise Cemetery and then to his former home which is now hers. Once there, Isabelle discovers that the property retains a vivid memory of her cousin and that both the cemetery and her new home are haunted by the characters and fantasies of his life.

== Cast ==
- Ovidie ... Isabelle
- Françoise Blanchard ... Lethal
- Dominique ... Herself
- Maurice Lemaître ... A Ghost
- Nathalie Perrey ... The Keeper of the Keys
- Jean-Loup Philippe ... A Ghost
- Jean Depelley ... Man-Owl
- Fabrice Maintoux ... Man-Cock
- Sabine Lenoël ... Femme ailée
- Jean-Pierre Bouyxou (voice)

== Release ==
The film initially premiered on 16 July 2007 at the Fantasia International Film Festival which was held at Concordia University in Montreal, with Rollin receiving a Lifetime Achievement Award. It received its screening in France on 30 March 2008 at the Lyon L'Étrange Festival.

A DVD was released in France on 3 February 2010 via LCJ distribution, the company behind the re-issues of many of Rollin's earlier films. The DVD contained a limited edition copy of Rollin's 2008 book, MoteurCoupez! Memoirs of a Singular Filmmaker, with the first 150 copies.

== Reception ==
The film received mixed reviews from online critics. As of February 2023, it holds a rating of 5.7/10 at the Internet Movie Database.
