= The Sidewalks of Bangkok =

Les trottoirs de Bangkok
- Theatrical release poster
- Directed by: Jean Rollin
- Written by: Jean-Claude Benhamou
- Produced by: André Samarcq
- Starring: Yoko; Françoise Blanchard; Brigitte Borghese; André-Richard Volniévy; Jean-Paul Bride; Antonina Laurent; Chokie; Olivier Rollin; Jean-Pierre Bouyxou; Pierre Pattin; Jean-Claude Benhamou; Gérard Landry
- Cinematography: Claude Bécognée
- Edited by: Janette Kronegger
- Music by: Georges Lartigau
- Production companies: Impex Films; Les Films ABC
- Distributed by: Cyrile Distribution
- Release date: 24 October 1984 (France)
- Running time: 85 minutes
- Country: France
- Language: French

Les trottoirs de Bangkok (English: The Sidewalks of Bangkok, also known as Bangkok Interdit) is a 1984 French erotic thriller film directed by Jean Rollin. The film was inspired by the 1932 Boris Karloff film The Mask of Fu Manchu. The film was released in France on 24 October 1984 by Cyrile Distribution. Hubert Toyot worked as a cameraman in this film.

In contrast to Rollin's usual themes of vampires, dream-like atmosphere and crumbling châteaus, Les Trottoirs des Bangkok mixes themes of adventure, crime and mystery with comic book dialogue, while still featuring naked women and sex, which his films were known for.

== Plot ==
Rick, a French secret service agent, is shot and killed. His friend Jacques retrieves Rick's camera, which contains shots of a young woman named Eva. The secret service concludes that she possesses the item Rick was killed for, a deadly substance that would kill an entire city if released. The secret service fly back to Bangkok to search for Eva, who works in a local brothel. Two women break into the secret service apartment, kill a man and retrieve the film canister; these women work for an evil syndicate which is run by a lady who is also in search of Eva. Since the secret service cannot afford to fly out to Paris, the syndicate get to Eva first.

Eva is helped by Claudine, another woman who works for the syndicate, who tries to arrange for Eva to be taken away on board a cargo ship and smuggled into France. Claudine arranges the murder of a French secret service agent and poses as the dead agent's wife when Agent Roger arrives. She takes him to the nightclub, where they pretend that Eva is nowhere to be found. During this visit, the film and its nature are revealed. Claudine tries to protect Eva, but they are captured by the syndicate. Eva is chained up and whipped. Claudine tries to save her but is killed. It turns out that Rick was not murdered after all. He shows up to rescue Eva, killing everyone, then tells Eva that he must kill her too. Eva overpowers him and kills him instead.

== Cast ==
- Yoko as Eva
- Françoise Blanchard as Claudine
- Jean-Claude Benhamou as Le Chef des Espions
- Jean-Pierre Bouyxou as Capitaine Bouyxou
- Jean-Paul Bride as Tong
- Gérard Landry as Rick
- Brigitte Borghese as Rita
- Chokie
- Michel Guibe
- Antonina Laurent
- Pierre Pattin
- Tiane Pochier
- Olivier Rollin
- André-Richard Volniévy
- Jean Rollin as Un Tueur (uncredited)

== Home media ==
Les Trottoirs de Bangkok was released on VHS in France on 18 August 1999 by LCJ.

The film was released on DVD in the United States on 27 August 2002 by Image Entertainment in a widescreen edition, and in the United Kingdom on 28 June 2004 by Redemption Films in full frame.
