= Le Sexe qui parle =

- American theatrical poster
- Directed by: Claude Mulot (as Frédéric Lansac)
- Produced by: Francis Leroi
- Starring: Pénélope Lamour; Jean-Loup Philippe
- Cinematography: Roger Fellous
- Music by: Mike Steïthenson
- Release date: 5 November 1975
- Running time: 70 minutes
- Country: France
- Language: French

Le Sexe qui parle is a 1975 French adult film by Claude Mulot. It was the first exclusive hardcore feature film produced and released in France to meet international success, and has since garnered a cult following. In 1977, Mulot directed the sequel Le Sexe qui parle II, which starts with the "infection" passed by Eric to a prostitute.

== Plot ==
Joëlle (Pénélope Lamour) is a beautiful executive at an advertising company who is married to Eric (Jean-Loup Philippe). Her vagina becomes infected with a mysterious affliction, ostensibly after being seduced by an attractive blonde girl, leading her to engage in indecent sexual acts. However, it is soon revealed that her problems stem from her sexual hardships and obsessions during adolescence. In the finale, she has sex with Eric, passing the "infection" to his penis.

== Cast ==
- Pénélope Lamour: Joëlle
- Jean-Loup Philippe (as Nils Hortzs): Eric
- Sylvia Bourdon: Barbara, Joëlle's aunt
- Béatrice Harnois: Young Joëlle
- Ellen Earl: Martine, the psychiatrist
- Vicky Messica: Richard, the reporter

== Cultural background ==
The film is an example of a significant tradition in literature and art of talking vaginas, dating back to the ancient folklore motif of the vagina loquens, or "talking cunt". These tales usually involve vaginas talking due to the effect of magic or charms, and often admitting to their unchastity. Talking female genitals feature in the Ozark folktale The magic walking stick, are an early theme in French literature, most notably in Les bijoux indiscrets and the 13th century fabliau Le Chevalier qui faisoit parler les cons et les culs, and the theme continues with The Vagina Monologues.

== US release ==
The film was exported to the United States with the title Pussy Talk and started a period of French porn chic in America, followed soon by films such as Candy’s Candy (Candice Candy) and Kinky Ladies of Bourbon Street (Mes Nuits avec Alice, Pénélope, Arnold, Maude et Richard) in 1976.
