= The Shiver of the Vampires =

Le frisson des vampires
- Original release poster
- Directed by: Jean Rollin
- Written by: Monique Natan; Jean Rollin
- Starring: Sandra Julien; Jean-Marie Durand; Jacques Ribiolles; Michel Delahaye; Marie-Pierre Castel; Kuelan Herce; Nicole Nancel; Dominique
- Edited by: Olivier Gregoire
- Music by: Groupe Acanthus
- Distributed by: Les Films ABC
- Release date: 21 April 1971
- Running time: 95 minutes
- Country: France
- Language: French

Le frisson des vampires (English: The Shiver of the Vampires, lit. The Thrill of the Vampires) is a 1971 film directed by Jean Rollin. It is his third vampire movie.

== Plot ==
Two newlyweds, Isle and Antoine, are on their honeymoon, on their way to visit Isle's two cousins. When they arrive in the town they discover that her cousins died the day before. Isle and Antoine go to the chateau where they lived anyway. Once there they are greeted by two female renfields who show them to a room.

Isle goes to the cemetery to visit the graves of her cousins, and a woman named Isabelle tells Isle that she was about to marry both of her cousins, but in a way she was already their brides. Isle decides to sleep alone on that night because she is upset. While getting ready for bed a woman emerges from the grandfather clock. She introduces herself as Isolde and takes Isle back to the cemetery where she bites Isle in the neck. Antoine, feeling lonely, goes to see Isle, but she isn't in her room. He searches the castle and comes to the chapel where it seems a human sacrifice is taking place. Two of the participants turn out to be Isle's cousins and explain they must kill the woman or she will become like them — vampires. Antoine goes back to find Isle in her room and isn't sure whether it was all a dream.

The next morning at breakfast the renfields tell Isle and Antoine that her cousins aren't really dead. Antoine goes to the library to meet the cousins but is instead knocked out by books. When he comes to, Antoine goes back to the dining room where he finally meets the cousins. That night Isle decided to sleep alone again, leaving Antoine angry. Isolde returns to Isle and bites her in the neck again. Isabelle tells a friend that Isle's cousins were once vampire slayers and were bitten by vampires. Isabelle later discovers that the cousins are still alive and under Isolde's control and Isolde tells her she is no longer welcome at the castle. She grabs Isabelle and pierces her breasts with her pointed nipple covers. Angry at her for doing this the cousins rape Isolde.

That night the renfields wake Antoine and take him to the chapel where a ceremony is about to take place that involves Isle, Isolde, the renfields and the cousins. Antoine breaks open the door to discover they have all disappeared. Unsure whether this was also a dream, he runs to Isle's room to tell her they must escape. She tells him no and that her cousins are the only family she has left, so Antoine decides to sleep on the couch in her room. The next morning Isle cries out that the sunlight hurts her eyes when Antoine opens the curtains. That night is Isle's initiation when she will be given the final kiss and made a vampire. Antoine tries to break it up by taking Isle away. The cousins follow them to a beach. Isolde tries to get into her coffin but finds it on fire. The renfields put a cross on the tomb door, sealing Isolde inside, so Isolde bites her wrist and dies. Antoine begs Isle to go with him but she stays with her cousins as they await the sunrise.

== Cast ==
- Sandra Julien as Isle
- Jean-Marie Durand as Antoine
- Jacques Robiolles
- Michel Delahaye
- Marie-Pierre Castel
- Kuelan Herce
- Nicole Nancel as Isabelle
- Dominique as Isolde

== Other titles ==
The title Le Frisson des Vampires has been translated into many titles in English, including:

- The Shiver of the Vampires
- Sex and Vampires
- Strange Things Happen at Night
- Terror of the Vampires
- Thrill of the Vampire
- Vampire Thrills

== Production ==
The love scene on the graves was filmed inside the cemetery at Clichy. Jean Rollin revealed that, "They would have never allowed us to shoot such an explicit sex scene inside a cemetery, so we lied to the caretakers about what we were going to do in there. Because it was late at night, there was only one cemetery guard around, and Natalie Perrey went to him with a couple of liquor bottles and kept him 'entertained' and distracted."

== Home media ==
Le Frisson des Vampires was released on VHS, in a full-frame version, in the UK by Redemption Films on 27 September 1993.

It was released on DVD by Encore in Europe as a two-disc set including a new 16:9/1.77:1 anamorphic widescreen version, digitally remastered French and English (dubbed) audio tracks, a slideshow of rare photos, audio commentary by Rollin, deleted scenes, the original trailer and a 32-page booklet. It was released on DVD again by Redemption on 27 September 2004 in the UK, and in the US on the 14 September 1999 by Image Entertainment.

The film was issued on Blu-ray in 2012 by Kino Lorber as part of a five-disc collection, along with La Rose de Fer, Fascination, La Vampire Nue and Lèvres de Sang.

It was released on Ultra HD Blu-ray on May 8, 2023, by Powerhouse Films along with Les deux orphelines vampires as the inaugural films of their series of Rollin restorations.

== Reception ==
In a contemporary review, the Monthly Film Bulletin stated, "Excellent visual qualities outweigh an inadequate narrative and some irritating music".
