= Two Orphan Vampires =

Les deux orphelines vampires
- Original theatrical release poster
- Directed by: Jean Rollin
- Written by: Jean Rollin
- Starring: Alexandra Pic; Isabelle Teboul; Bernard Charnacé; Nathalie Perrey
- Cinematography: Norbert Marfaing-Sintes
- Edited by: Nathalie Perrey
- Music by: Philippe D'Aram
- Distributed by: Les Films ABC; Avia Films
- Release date: 9 July 1997
- Running time: 107 minutes
- Country: France
- Language: French
- Budget: ₣3,000,000

Les deux orphelines vampires (English: Two Orphan Vampires) is a 1997 French fantasy horror/drama film directed by Jean Rollin. The film was an adaptation of Rollin's novel of the same name. Rollin was primarily known for his vampire-themed works, but Les deux orphelines vampires was actually Rollin's first vampire film since 1979's Fascination.

== Plot ==
Louise and Henriette are a pair of orphaned sisters, innocent and sightless. After sunset, though, they begin to see (although they see everything through a shade of blue) and to crave blood. The girls embark on a journey through the city of Paris to find victims and quench their thirst, otherwise they would die. Their only refuges are the cemeteries, where they find solitude and piece together the fragmented memories of their past lives.

== Cast ==
- Alexandra Pic as Louise
- Isabelle Teboul as Henriette
- Bernard Charnacé as Dr. Dennary
- Nathalie Perrey as Sister Marthe
- Anne Duguël as Mother Superior
- Nathalie Karsenty
- Anissa Berkani-Rohmer as Nicole
- Raymond Audemard
- Tina Aumont as Ghoul
- Catherine Day
- Camille Delamarre
- Véronique Djaouti as Venus
- Michel Franck
- Frederique Haymann
- Paulette Jauffre

== Production ==
The film was shot on location in Paris and New York. The same locations were used in Rollin's 1989 film Perdues dans New York (Lost in New York).

== Reception ==
The film has received mixed reviews. Online reviewer DVD Resurrections has said that the film is "fairly good if one is in the right mood", and gave the film 6.5 out of 10. Online reviewer Digital Vampiric Discs has said, "You'll probably find it boring if you're not used to Rollin's style, and even if you are you'll probably have to be in the mood for this one". Götterdämmerung said that it is "an interesting little film that is a bit plodding in places and that requires some patience to decide", and that "nevertheless a rewarding viewing experience".

== Home media ==
Les deux orphelines vampires was released by Kino Lorber on DVD in 1997 and on Blu-ray in 2012. It was remastered and released in 4K UHD by Powerhouse Films in May 2023.
