= Françoise Blanchard =

French actress

- Françoise Blanchard in Jean Rollins's La Morte Vivante (1982)
- Born: Françoise Denise Aline Blanchard; 6 June 1954; Saint-Mandé, Val-de-Marne, France
- Died: 24 May 2013 (aged 58); Caen, Calvados, France
- Occupation: Actress
- Years active: 1976–2013
- Notable work: La morte vivante (1982)

Françoise Denise Aline Blanchard (6 June 1954 – 24 May 2013) was a French actress. Her most notable work is that of her role in the 1982 French film La morte vivante, directed by Jean Rollin. Blanchard had collaborated with Rollin on several occasions in films Les trottoirs de Bangkok (1984), À la poursuite de Barbara (1991) and La nuit des horloges (2007). She had worked frequently with directors Richard Balducci and Jesús Franco. She was also known for her work as a voice artist, having dubbed films, such as, Robert Altman's Popeye (1980), The NeverEnding Story III (1994) and Hackers (1995), and animated television series, Teenage Mutant Ninja Turtles and Totally Spies!

== Career ==
Blanchard's career stretched from between the late 1970s until the early 1990s. She may have been best known for playing Catherine Valmont in 1982 horror La Morte Vivante (The Living Dead Girl), a film from Jean Rollin.

She also appeared in films by directors Jess Franco and Bruno Mattei. She recalled her career in an interview, which was featured on the Encore release of La Morte Vivante, she mentioned that it was a tragedy and a coincidence that started her career in the late 1970s. While trying to make ends meet as a hand model, she lost her brother in the late 1970. Around that same time she was offered her first role, coincidentally as someone who had also lost a family member. Françoise approached the part skeptically as she remembered that at that time she was, "aggressive against people but also a bit confused" due to the death of her brother. She enjoyed the experience and took a serious interest in acting, so decided to take acting lessons afterwards.

Blanchard soon became involved in several B movies when her career quickly became intertwined with the legendary Eurocine company. "I liked the feel of these B movies, especially horror", Françoise noted to Encore, which perhaps explains why she became so popular to several of the most noteworthy genre directors of the late 1970s. She also mentioned that she didn't mind nudity and even went so far as to pose for Lui Magazine in the early 1980s. After several films directors such as Pierre Chevalier, Françoise took a role in Bruno Mattei's Caligula and Messalina in 1981. The following year she appeared in Jess Franco's Revenge In The House Of Usher, and she liked Franco and admired his creativity and fire.

She then appeared in the La Morte Vivante with Rollin. The night shoot on the film was mostly difficult and there were many problems with the special effects but, despite some disagreements, she liked and admired Rollin and admitted to Encore that, "he is really nice and is very much there". She enjoyed working with and admired her co-star in the film, Italian actress Marina Pierro, and noted, "she is very maternal with me." Françoise worked again with Rollin in Les Trottoirs De Bangkok (The Sidewalks Of Bangkok), a film which she had a lot of fun making, and she appeared in his newest film production La nuit des horloges (The Night of Clocks) opposite Ovidie.

== Death ==
Blanchard died on 24 May 2013, twelve days before her 59th birthday. The cause of death was not disclosed.

== Filmography ==
Film
Year	Title	Role
1976	Sexuella	(unnamed / unknown role)
1979	Les joyeuses colonies de vacances	L'infirmière
1980	Une si jolie petite fille	Françoise
1980	Une maison bien tranquille	(unnamed / unknown role)
1981	Caligula et Messaline	Agrippina / Caligula's sister
1981	Les brigades roses	(unnamed / unknown role)
1981	La maison Tellier	La veuve
1982	L'oasis des filles perdues	Annie
1982	Nerone e Poppea	poppea (credited as Patricia Derek)
1982	N'oublie pas ton père au vestiaire...	Juliette
1982	Les p'tites têtes	Paloma
1982	La morte vivante (The Living Dead Girl)	Catherine Valmont
1983	Revenge in the House of Usher (French version)	Melissa
1983	On l'appelle Catastrophe	La fille
1983	L'émir préfère les blondes	Sylvie
1984	Vénus	Annie
1984	Les trottoirs de Bangkok (The Sidewalks of Bangkok)	Claudine
1985	Y'a pas le feu...	Juliette
1985	Le facteur de Saint-Tropez	Maria Ficelle
1986	Les amazones du temple d'or	Blonde Amazon
1986	Sida, la peste del siglo XX	(unnamed / unknown role)
1987	Manières d'amour	Françoise
1991	À la poursuite de Barbara (short)	(unnamed / unknown role)
1997	Alliance cherche doigt	La femme de Chaneloup
2007	La nuit des horloges (The Night of the Clocks)	Lethal

Voice work
Year	Title	Role	Notes
1980	Popeye	Olive Oyl	French dub (played by Shelley Duvall)
1989–91	Babar	Unnamed role	Seasons 1, 3 & 4 (3 episodes)
1991	Lucky Luke	Coyotito	Season 2 (6 episodes)
1991	Bucky O'Hare and the Toad Wars	Unnamed role	Season 1, Episode 1 (French dub)
1991	Little Dracula	Unnamed role	Unknown episode(s) (French dub)
1991–92	Teenage Mutant Ninja Turtles	Unnamed role	"Michaelangelo Meets Mondo Gecko" (French dub) "Rock Around the Block" (French dub)
1992	Souris souris	Unnamed role	Unknown episodes(s)
1994	The NeverEnding Story III	Jane Bux	French Dub (played by Tracey Ellis)
1995	Hackers	Margo Wallace	French Dub (played by Lorraine Bracco)
1995	Pride and Prejudice	Caroline Bingley	French dub; BBC miniseries (played by Anna Chancellor)
1996–97	Poil de carotte	Remi / Agathe	Unknown episode(s)
1997	Michel Strogoff	Sangarre la Bohémienne	Miniseries (10 episodes)
2000	Dracula: Resurrection	Dorko/Mina	Video game
2000	Les globulyss	Unnamed role	Unknown episode(s)
2000	Dracula 2: The Last Sanctuary	Dorko/Mina	Video game
2003–04	Martin Mystery	Unnamed role	"Terror from the Sky" "Return of the Dark Druid"
2006	Team Galaxy	Mrs. Roskoff	Unknown episode(s)
2009–10	The Amazing Spiez!	Unnamed role	"Operation Dyno-might!" "Operation Trudy on Duty"
2004–13	Totally Spies!	Unnamed role	"Physics 101 Much?" "The Anti-Social Network"
