= Lips of Blood =

- Theatrical poster
- Directed by: Jean Rollin
- Written by: Jean-Loup Philippe; Jean Rollin
- Produced by: Lionel Wallmann; Jean-Marie Ghanassia
- Starring: Jean-Loup Philippe; Annie Belle; Nathalie Perrey
- Cinematography: Jean-François Robin
- Edited by: Olivier Grégoire
- Music by: Didier William Lepauw
- Distributed by: Off Production; Scorpion V; Nordia Films
- Release date: 27 May 1975
- Running time: 87 minutes
- Country: France
- Language: French

Lips of Blood (French: Lèvres de sang) is a 1975 French horror film directed by Jean Rollin, and starring Jean-Loup Philippe, Annie Belle, and Nathalie Perrey. The film tells the story of a man who begins to have visions of a young woman dressed in white who is locked behind the gates of a château.

The film was released theatrically in France in May 1975. The following year, a 71-minute alternative version of the film was released under the title Suce-moi vampire (lit. Suck me, vampire), featuring an altered storyline and hardcore sex scenes.

== Plot ==
At a reception for the launch of a new perfume, a man named Frédéric sees a photo of the ruins of an old château by the sea. His mind takes him back to when he was a young boy, walking up to the gate of the château and speaking with a girl who appears to be a little older than he is. Young Frédéric opens the gate and the girl tells him to go to sleep, and later she returns and wakes him. He leaves her and closes the gate behind him. The girl tells him to open the gate but he promises her that he will be back to free her. Frédéric's mind then comes back to reality and he becomes convinced that the meeting between him and the girl actually happened. He tells his mother, who begins to act strangely and tells him he must have imagined it. He does not agree and sets out to find the girl and set her free.

Jennifer, the girl from the château, begins to appear to Frédéric in a number of visions, but she does not speak to him, which makes it much more difficult to find her at the château. On one of her appearances, Jennifer leads Frédéric to a cemetery, where she makes him open up coffins that unleash a hoard of female vampires. Frédéric runs off and is soon met by a woman claiming to be Jennifer as she is now. The woman leads him to an abandoned apartment block and locks him in, as the real Jennifer watches from a distance. The woman is then killed by the vampires, who free Frédéric. A man with a gun almost kills Frédéric, but he manages to escape the gunman and go home, where his mother has him committed to a mental hospital. It is revealed that his mother was behind the attempts by the woman and the gunman to prevent Frédéric from finding the château.

At the hospital, Jennifer appears to Frédéric again, but he begins to doubt his sanity when she does not speak. The vampires show up at the hospital and kill his psychiatrist and let him escape. Walking along the streets, Frédéric buys a postcard of the château from a blind man; the name of it is Sauveterre Castle. As he boards a train, Jennifer appears once more to him and smiles, knowing that he is on his way to her. Once at the château, he is met by the vampires and then finds Jennifer's coffin, which is surrounded by a shrine. Before he can open it, his mother appears in the doorway and tells him not to free Jennifer and that he did not imagine meeting her as a young boy. His mother goes on to explain that Jennifer is a vampire and that she infected several people, including the four female vampires he freed. As daylight sets in, Frédéric's mother and a group of men hunt and kill the four vampires. She asks Frédéric to kill Jennifer. He brings the head of a doll, which his mother thinks is Jennifer's head, to be burned along with the four other vampires. Frédéric and Jennifer go to the beach, and she is happy to see daylight again after 20 years. Jennifer bites Frédéric to turn him into a vampire and they climb into the coffin to let the tide take them out into the ocean which will lead them to a desert island called Sand Island so they can prey on unexpected rich sailors with impunity.

== Cast ==
- Jean-Loup Philippe as Frédéric
- Annie Belle as Jennifer (credited as Annie Briand)
- Nathalie Perrey as La Mère de Frédéric
- Martine Grimaud
- Catherine Castel as Jumelle Vampire
- Marie-Pierre Castel as Jumelle Vampire
- Hélène Maquin
- Anita Berglund
- Claudine Beccarie as Claudine
- Béatrice Harnois
- Sylvia Bourdon
- Mireille Dargent
- Paul Bisciglia as Le Psychiatre
- Willy Braque as Le Tueur
- Julien Etchevery
- Serge Rollin as Frédéric enfant
- Jean Rollin as Le Gardien du Cimetière (uncredited)

== Production ==
Filming of Lèvres de Sang took place in Paris. Rollin shot numerous sequences in abandoned and decrepit section of Belleville that was in the process of being demolished. The ruin featured in the film is the Château Gaillard in Eure, Normandy.

== Release ==
=== Home media ===
Lèvres de Sang was released on DVD in the US by Image Entertainment on 9 November 1999 in a widescreen, letterboxed 1.65:1 version, with a French Dolby Digital 1.0 audio track and English subtitles. The special features included a stills gallery and filmography.

It was released in the UK by Redemption Films on 29 March 2004 in a widescreen, letterboxed 1.65:1 version, with a French Dolby Digital 2.0 audio track and English subtitles. The special features included the theatrical trailer and a stills gallery.

It was released in Europe by Encore Entertainment on 30 November 2005 as a 3-disc limited edition set with a new anamorphic widescreen 1.78:1 version and a French Dolby Digital 2.0 audio track with English, Dutch, German, Italian, Spanish, Portuguese, Finnish, Danish, Norwegian, Swedish and Polish subtitles. The special features included an introduction by Rollin; a selected scenes commentary by Rollin; interviews with Castel, Perry and Philippe; the featurette This Beach That Follows Me; the short film Les Amours Jaunes; and a 64-page booklet.

The film was released again in the US by Redemption on 29 July 2008 in its original widescreen version, and a French Dolby Digital 2.0 audio track with English subtitles. The extras included an introduction by Rollin, interviews with Perry and Philippe, and a stills gallery.

Lèvres de Sang was released on Blu-ray in 2012 by Kino Lorber as part of a five-disc collection, along with La Rose de Fer, Fascination, Le Frisson des Vampires and La Vampire Nue; a standalone disc was also released.

In October 2023, Indicator Films released limited edition 4K UHD and standard Blu-ray editions of the film in both the United Kingdom and United States, featuring newly-commissioned bonus material.

== Sources ==
- Smith, Gary A. (2017). Vampire Films of the 1970s: Dracula to Blacula and Every Fang Between. Jefferson, North Carolina: McFarland. ISBN 978-1-476-62559-1.
