= Jean-Loup Philippe =

French actor, writer and director (1934–2025)

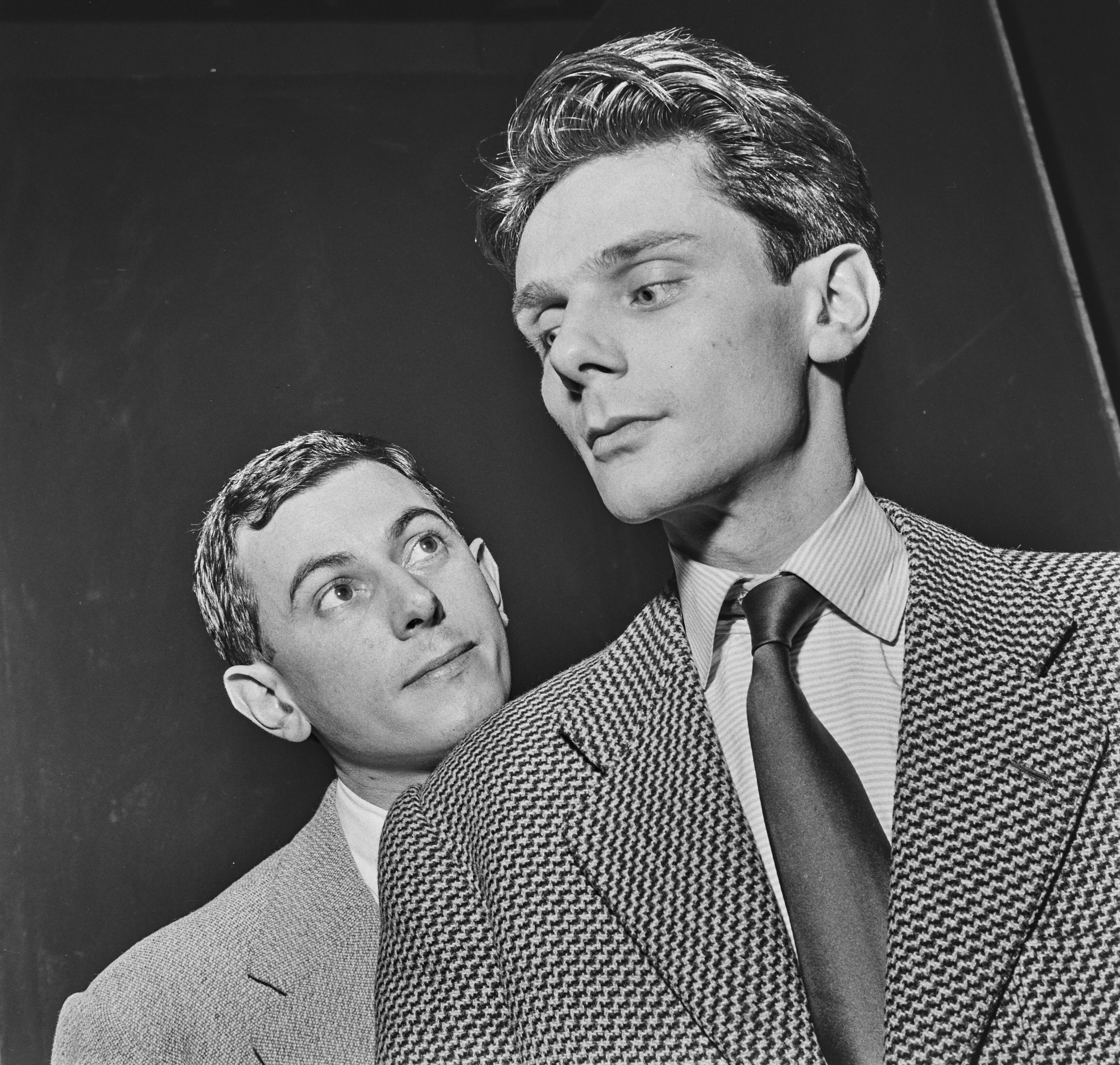
- Born: 24 March 1934; Paris, France
- Died: 3 February 2025 (aged 90); Poissy, France
- Occupations: Actor, writer, director
- Years active: 1956–2013

Jean-Loup Philippe (24 March 1934 – 3 February 2025) was a French actor, writer and director of film and theatre He is best known for his role in Jean Rollin's 1975 horror classic Lèvres de sang. He collaborated with Rollin on several occasions, having worked on Les paumées du petit matin (1981), Killing Car (1993) and La nuit des horloges (2007).

== Life and career ==
Philippe began his acting career in 1956, appearing uncredited in the film En effeuillant la marguerite, with Daniel Gélin and Brigitte Bardot. He had a larger role in his next film, Escapade, with Louis Jourdan. Following his 1957 film, Une manche et la belle, his acting career became somewhat erratic, with film appearances occurring every few years. After a long break, Philippe returned with the film, L'itinéraire marin in a small role, and his first time working with French director Jean Rollin. He starred in the 1963 film Les bonnes causes, with award-winning actors Marina Vlady, Bourvil, and Virna Lisi. His final film of the sixties was the comedy Les gros bras. Following another long break, Philippe starred in Jean Rollin's Lèvres de sang, his first leading role, and a film he is best known for, for which he also served as dialogue writer. His final three films were also directed by Rollin, Les paumées du petit matin, Killing Car and La nuit des horloges. Philippe's other credits include the adult feature, Le sexe qui parle and Un jour un tueur, with the award-winning actress Mylène Demongeot.

Philippe also appeared on television, his first appearance was in the 1964 television film Mademoiselle Molière. He guest starred in the long-running television comedy series Au théâtre ce soir and the mini-series Cinq à sec.

In 2011, Philippe appeared in the Jean Rollin documentary Jean Rollin, le rêveur égaré.

Philippe died on 3 February 2025, at the age of 90.

== Filmography ==
Film
Year	Title	Role	Notes
1956	En effeuillant la marguerite	Ami de Daniel	Uncredited; Mam'selle Striptease
1957	Escapade	Philippe	Escape
1957	A Kiss for a Killer	Bob Farnwell	
1961	Aimez-vous Brahms?		Goodbye Afain?
1963	L'itinéraire marin		
1963	Les bonnes causes	L'ami de Gina	Good Causes
1964	Les gros bras	Éric - le frère de Barbara	
1968	Le viol du vampire	Dr. Samsky	Uncredited; The Rape of the Vampire
1975	Lèvres de sang	Frédéric	Lips of Blood
1975	Suce moi vampire	Frédéric	Hard core version of Lèvres de sang
1975	Le sexe qui parle	Eric	The Sex Talk, Pussy Talk
1979	Un jour un tueur	Fabrizio	
1981	Les paumées du petit matin		The Escapees, The Runaways
1989	Killing Car	Antique Dealer	
2007	La nuit des horloges		The House of the Clocks
2013	Bien profond dans ton âme	L'empereur	

Television
Year	Title	Role	Notes
1964	Mademoiselle Molière	Baron	Television film
1966	Au théâtre ce soir	Georges	Episode: "Les portes claquent"
1977	Cinq à sec	Blanchard	Television mini-series

== Theatre ==
- 1956: Thé et sympathie (Tea and Sympathy) (Tom), directed by Jean Mercure - Théâtre de Paris
- 1959: Spectacle, directed by Jacques Polieri - Théâtre de l'Alliance
- 1960: Le centre (The Centre), directed by Jacques Polieri - Théâtre de l'Alliance
- 1960: À vous Wellington (Wellington to You), directed by François Maistre - Théâtre du Vieux-Colombier
- 1966: Les portes claquent (The Doors Slam) (Georges)
