= The Iron Rose =

- Theatrical poster
- French: La rose de fer
- Literally: The Iron Rose
- Directed by: Jean Rollin
- Written by: Jean Rollin; Tristan Corbière; Maurice Lemaître
- Produced by: Sam Selsky
- Starring: Françoise Pascal; Hugues Quester; Nathalie Perrey; Mireille Dargent; Michel Dalessalle
- Cinematography: Jean-Jacques Renon
- Edited by: Michel Patient
- Music by: Pierre Raph
- Distributed by: Les Films ABC
- Release date: 6 December 1973
- Running time: 90 minutes
- Country: France
- Language: French

The Iron Rose (French: La rose de fer, also known as The Crystal Rose) is a 1973 French horror drama film directed by Jean Rollin, and starring Françoise Pascal, Hugues Quester, Nathalie Perrey, Mireille Dargent, and Michel Dalessalle. It was his first film not to feature vampires, a theme for which he was best known, but it still features all the dream-like qualities associated with his films.

== Plot ==
A young woman and man meet at a wedding reception and arrange a date. They meet at a railway station and go for a picnic and bike ride. While cycling, they see the entrance of a lonely cemetery and decide to go inside.

Once inside the huge cemetery, the woman becomes anxious. The man calms her and persuades her to enter a crypt with him. A strange man watches the couple. The man and the woman make love in the crypt. A clown places some flowers on a nearby grave and leaves. An old woman closes the cemetery gates.

When the couple finally exit the crypt, night has fallen and they cannot find their way out. They begin to panic. They discover a small building; inside are several child-sized coffins holding small skeletons. The woman becomes moody and exhibits bizarre behavior and personality changes. She locks her lover in the crypt and he suffocates. Dawn finds the woman dancing around the cemetery, and later entering the crypt herself. The old woman reopens the cemetery gates. Finding the crypt closed, she puts flowers on top of it.

== Cast ==
- Françoise Pascal as La femme
- Hugues Quester as L'homme
- Natalie Perrey as La vieille femme au cimetière
- Mireille Dargent as Le Clown
- Michel Delesalle as Le vampire
- Jean Rollin as Le rôdeur

== Release ==
The Iron Rose was released in France on 6 December 1973 by Les Films ABC.

== Home media ==
La Rose de Fer was released on DVD in its original aspect ratio of 1.62:1 on 20 January 2005 in Europe by X-Rated Kult DVD, in the UK on 28 March 2005 by Redemption Films and in the US on 25 September 2007 by Redemption.

It was released on Blu-ray on 24 January 2012 by Kino Lorber/Redemption in a newly restored HD remaster in an aspect ratio of 1.67:1, containing an English dubbed version and the original French audio, both in LPMC 2.0, with the inclusion of optional English subtitles. Special features on the set included trailers, interviews with Pascal and Perrey, and a booklet essay by Video Watchdog editor Tim Lucas.

The film was additionally released on Blu-ray by Redemption as part of a five-disc collection, along with Fascination, La Vampire Nue, Le Frisson des Vampires and Lèvres de Sang.

In 2017, it was announced that The Iron Rose will be released on Blu-ray in the United Kingdom by Screenbound Pictures subsidiary Black House on 16 November 2017; it will be the first Rollin film available in the UK in that format.

In 2025, The Iron Rose was re-released on Blu-ray and 4K Blu-ray in both the United Kingdom and the United States by Indicator, in an edition featuring a new master and both the French and UK versions of the film.
