= Les paumées du petit matin =

1981 film by Jean Rollin

Les paumées du petit matin; The Escapees
- Directed by: Jean Rollin
- Written by: Jacques Ralf; Jean Rollin
- Starring: Laurence Dubas; Christiane Coppé; Marianne Valiot; Patrick Perrot; Louise Dhour; Brigitte Lahaie
- Cinematography: Claude Bécognée
- Music by: Philippe D'Arm
- Distributed by: Les Films ABC; Impex Films
- Release date: 27 October 1982
- Running time: 95 minutes
- Country: France
- Language: French

Les paumées du petit matin (English: The Escapees, also known as The Runaways) is a 1981 drama film directed by Jean Rollin. A drama, it maintained the fairytale and romantic qualities of Rollin's earlier films Requiem pour un Vampire, Fascination and La Nuit des Traquées, but departed from his usual horror themes.

== Synopsis ==
The story begins in a mental asylum run by nuns. Michelle, a troubled teenager, has been returned to the asylum after escaping and is put in a straitjacket and then locked in a room. She manages to get the attention of a new patient, Marie, a quiet girl who just seems to sit in the garden in a rocking chair. Marie helps Michelle by removing her straitjacket, and the pair run off together.

At first, Michelle wants to leave on her own, but Marie wants to go with her and the two form a tenuous friendship. They follow a group of burlesque dancers who they encounter in an old scrapyard as they roam the countryside. They befriend a thief named Sophie, who helps them escape when the burlesque show is busted. Sophie tells them of a crate with clothes inside, so the trio go to get the clothing. When there, a man attempts to attack Marie so she runs off, Michelle chasing after her. Marie finds herself in an ice skating rink and changes into the clothing, skating beautifully before ending in a fit of a hysterics, where Michelle holds her in her arms. They open up to each other about being abandoned (Michelle as a baby, Marie later on), and gain a better understanding of each other. Ending up in a shipyard, they connect with bar owner Madame Louise, who takes in runaways.

Sophie convinces her sailor boyfriend to not only stow her away for the next voyage, but the other two as well. Marie and Michelle later meet two men and two women at Louise's, who take them away to a mansion. The two women get handsy with Marie as Michelle is shown by one of the men on the floor above his room of military paraphernalia and weapons. Marie stabs the women as they try to rape her, while Michelle hearing Marie's cries for help shoots the man above, running downstairs as the other man calls the police.

Sophie couldn't leave her friends behind, waiting with her boyfriend and finally choosing to get off the ship. When she gets off she is placed in handcuffs for an earlier pickpocketing episode, and chooses to run and jumps off the dock to her death onto some pontoons floating below. When the police arrive at the mansion, a gun battle ensues, and with their last two bullets, Michelle and Marie share a kiss before agreeing to fulfill a suicide pact. Marie, however, can't bring herself to pull the trigger, so Michelle walks out holding her body. Michelle walks down to the water with Marie's body, the film ends on this shot.

== Cast ==
- Laurence Dubas as Michéle
- Christiane Coppé as Marie
- Marianne Valiot as Sophie
- Patrick Perrot as Pierrot
- Louise D'hour as Mme Louise
- Jean-Louis Fortuit as Roger
- Jean Herel as Maurice's Associate
- Claude Lévêque as Maurice
- Patricia Mercurol as Patty
- Brigitte Lahaie as Roger's Friend
- Celina Royce as Roger's Friend
- Jean-Philippe Delamarre as Senior Policeman
- Bernard Papineau as Doctor
- Nathalie Perrey as Nurse
- Pearl June as Pearl
- Doriane Gaschette as Maria
- Jean-Loup Philippe as Momo

== Home media ==
VHS releases of Les Paumées du Petit Matin were only available in some countries, such as France, Canada and Turkey.

A DVD edition was released 26 January 2009 by Redemption Films in the UK, and 31 March 2009 by Salvation Films in the US. These DVD editions included an interview with Rollin which runs for almost an hour where he discusses the film and other works.

The film was released on Blu-ray on 26 May 2015 by Redemption. For the first time, the film was remastered in HD from the original 35 mm negative.
