= The Night of the Hunted =

La nuit des traquées
- Original theatrical poster
- Directed by: Jean Rollin
- Written by: Jean Rollin
- Produced by: Lionel Wallmann
- Starring: Brigitte Lahaie; Vincent Gardère; Dominique Journet; Bernard Papineau; Catherine Greiner
- Edited by: Gilbert Kikoine
- Music by: Gary Sandeur
- Distributed by: Impex Films
- Release date: 20 August 1980
- Running time: 91 minutes
- Country: France
- Language: French

La nuit des traquées (English: The Night of the Hunted, lit. The Night of the Stalking) is a 1980 French horror film directed and written by Jean Rollin, and starring Brigitte Lahaie, Dominique Journet, and Catherine Greiner. It follows a group of people who have lost their memories in an environmental accident and are confined in a high-rise hospital.

== Plot ==
On a cold dark night, a man is driving through the countryside and discovers a young woman who seems to be running from something. The man stops and puts her in his car and does not notice another woman, who is completely naked, calling out for her. The woman tells the man that her name is Elizabeth; she insists there are people after her but she seems to be confused and frightened. He takes Elizabeth to his apartment in Paris and realizes she is incapable of remembering anything for any length of time. He tells her his name is Robert, which she has trouble remembering a few minutes later. She begs him not to leave her as she will forget him, and the pair make love, during which Robert tells Elizabeth to remember his face so she will never forget this time together. The next morning Robert has to go to work and when he's gone, Dr. Francis breaks into his apartment to persuade Elizabeth to return to the clinic, where she escaped from, where people are being treated for memory loss.

On her return to the clinic, Elizabeth seems to remember the woman, the one who called out for her the night before, but they only remember each other's name, nothing more. The two of them attempt another escape and manage to get in contact with Robert, as Elizabeth remembers him, but they are both recaptured. Robert locates the clinic where he is told by Dr. Francis that the patients are suffering from a disease that slowly takes their memories away, and soon all the afflicted will become like the walking dead, but Robert refuses to believe this and is determined to rescue Elizabeth.

The doctors at the clinic begin to dispose of the people whose memories have gone completely. Robert manages to find Elizabeth, but it is too late now that the disease has taken her completely. Dr. Francis shoots Robert in the head and he becomes just like Elizabeth. Unaware what is going on around them, Elizabeth and Robert join hands and walk side by side.

== Cast ==
- Brigitte Lahaie as Elizabeth
- Vincent Gardère as Robert
- Dominique Journet as Véronique
- Bernard Papineau as Le Docteur Francis
- Rachel Mhas as Solange
- Catherine Greiner
- Nathalie Perrey as La Mère (credited as Natalie Perrey)
- Christian Farina
- Élodie Delage as Marie (credited as Véronique Délaissé)
- Cyril Val (credited as Alain Plumey)
- Jean Hérel as Jacques
- Jacques Gatteau as Pierre
- Dominique Saint-Clare
- Grégoire Cherlian as Le Gardien
- Jean Cherlian as L'homme de Main

== Release ==
=== Home media ===
Redemption Films released La Nuit des Traquées on Blu-ray in 2013. Powerhouse Films released editions on 4K Blu-ray and standard Blu-ray formats in North America on 22 August 2023.

== Sources ==
- The Scarecrow Video Movie Guide (2004). The Scarecrow Video Movie Guide. Seattle, Washington: Sasquatch Books. p. 216. ISBN 978-1-570-61415-6.
