= Nathalie Perrey =

French actress (1929-2012)

- Born: Marie–Therese Amelie Perrey; 28 February 1929; Metz, France
- Died: 25 March 2012 (aged 83); Paris, France
- Other name: Natalie Perrey
- Occupations: Actress, various
- Years active: 1967–2009
- Children: Cyrille Gaudin

Nathalie Perrey (born Marie–Therese Amelie Perrey; 28 February 1929 – 25 March 2012) was a French actress, best known for her many years working with director Jean Rollin. Her long career also included regular work as a film editor and script supervisor.

== Career ==
Perrey worked for nearly four decades in the French film industry., most notably as an actress. She appeared in many small or supporting roles, and is best known for her work with director Jean Rollin in various productions over a thirty-year period. Perrey made her film debut in 1969 in Rollin's La vampire nue, his second feature film. She went on to play minor roles in a number of his other films, including La rose de fer, Lèvres de sang, ''La nuit des traquées, Les paumées du petit matin, Perdues dans New York, Les deux orphelines vampires, La fiancée de Dracula and La nuit des horloges.

Perrey also worked with Rollin in various other capacities. In 1970, she was a production assistant for Rollin's third feature, Le frisson des vampires. She subsequently served as a screenplay writer for Tout le monde il en a deux, an assistant director for Fascination and Les paumées du petit matin, for which she also worked as script supervisor, and as editor on Les deux orphelines vampires and La fiancée de Dracula for which she also served as costume designer and script supervisor. Perrey also worked as script supervisor on Requiem for a Vampire and La Rose de Fer .

== Filmography ==
Film
Year	Title	Role	Notes
1969	La Vampire Nue	Old Woman	The Naked Vampire
1970	Paris interdit	Une élève du cours de danse	Forbidden Paris; uncredited role
1971	On ne se dit pas tout entre époux		Short film
1971	La débauche	La femme du poète	Wife Swapping: French Style
1972	La rose de fer	Woman in Cemetery	The Iron Rose
1973	Le sourire vertical	Mère Jeanne des Anges	The Vertical Smile
1975	Lèvres de sang	Frédéric's Mother	Lips of Blood
1976	Suce moi vampire	Frédéric's Mother	Suck Me Vampire; Lips of Blood (hard version)
1978	Entrechattes	Dorothée Richemond	
1978	Jouir!	Mado	
1980	La nuit des traquées	La mère	Night of the Hunted
1981	Les paumées du petit matin	Asylum Nurse	The Escapees, The Runaways
1982	Mélodie pour Manuella	Manuella's Mother	Bizarre Marilyn
1982	Les défonceuses	La patronne du coffee-shop	
1983	Baby Cat		
1984	Jeans Tonic	Customer	
1989	Perdues dans New York	Old Michelle	Lost in New York
1997	Les deux orphelines vampires	Nun, School Teacher	The Two Orphan Vampires
2002	La fiancée de Dracula	La sorcière	Dracula's Fiancee
2005	Quelque chose de mal	La grande-mère	Short film
2007	La nuit des horloges		Night of Clocks
2009	L'histoire de Marie	Old Woman	Short film

Year	Title	Notes
1967	Don Cherry	Short documentary; director
1969	Hallucinations sadiques	Sadistic Hallucinations; costumer
1970	Bartleby	Short film; script girl
1970	Le frisson des Vampires	Production assistant
1971	Requiem pour un vampire	Script
1971	La débauche	Assistant director
1972	Les petits enfants d'Attila	Script girl
1972	Le seuil du vide	Continuity
1972	La rose de fer	Script
1972	Pervertissima	Unit production manager
1974	Q	Prickly Problems; Script supervisor
1974	Tout le monde il en a deux	Screenplay writer
1976	Candice Candy	French Nympho; continuity
1977	Je suis une belle salope	I am a Beautiful Bitch; script supervisor
1977	Suprêmes jouissances	Exquisite Pleasure; script supervisor
1977	La grande baise	Script supervisor
1977	Les hôtesses du sexe	Writer
1977	Le roi des bricoleurs	Assistant director; editor
1979	Le piège à cons	script supervisor
1979	Pénétrez-moi par le petit trou	script supervisor
1979	Fascination	Assistant director
1980	Le segrete esperienze di Luca e Fanny	Summer in the Country; script supervisor
1981	Les Paumées du Petit Matin	Continuity, first assistant director
1982	Les défonceuses	Script supervisor
1983	Baby Cat	Continuity
1990	Le trésor des îles chiennes	Editor
1992	La plage des enfants perdus	Editor
1992	Coyote	Editor (Paris)
1995	Shéhérazade	Short film; editor
1995	Le poids du ciel	Short film; editor
1995	La prière de l'absent	Editor
1995	Jonathan	Short film; editor
1997	Les tourments de Miss Murphy	Short film; editor
1997	Les deux orphelines vampires	Editor
1998	Bye-Bye Souirty	Editor
2000	Banco	Script supervisor
2000	Ma sexualité de A à X	Direct-to-video; script supervisor
2001	Le septième ciel	Short film; script supervisor
2001	Le septième ciel	Short film; script supervisor; editor
2002	La fiancée de Dracula	Script supervisor; costume designer; editor
2002	Le miroir du fou	Continuity girl, script supervisor; editor
2002	Au premier dimanche d'août	A Summer Night Rendez-vous; short film; editor
2004	Julie Meyer	Short film; script supervisor
2007	Fi Intidar Pasolini	Editor
2009	L'histoire de Marie	Script supervisor
