= The Rape of the Vampire =

Le viol du vampire
- Original poster
- Directed by: Jean Rollin
- Written by: Jean Rollin
- Starring: Solange Pradel; Bernard Letrou; Catherine Deville; Ursule Pauly; Nicole Romain; Marquis Polho; Louise Horn; Jacqueline Sieger
- Edited by: Jean-Denis Bonan; Mireille Abramovici
- Music by: Yvon Garault
- Distributed by: Les Films ABC
- Release date: May 1968
- Running time: 95 minutes
- Country: France
- Language: French
- Budget: ₣500,000

Le viol du vampire (English: The Rape of the Vampire, also known as The Queen of the Vampires) is a 1968 film directed by Jean Rollin. It was his directorial debut. The film consists of two parts: The Rape of the Vampire and The Vampire Woman/Queen of the Vampires. Originally, the film was only supposed to be a short, but a second part was filmed and added later so that it could be released as a feature film.

Critical reaction to the film was very hostile. Its poetic spirit and strong inspiration from American serials did not seem to attract viewers or critics at the time of its release. The film was received negatively and provoked a scandal, but it remains an important film in the Rollin oeuvre. Themes developed in his subsequent feature films were already present: vampires, a fascination with old cemeteries, lesbianism and a pronounced taste for eroticism. Some scenes and characters were copied almost identically in his later films.

== Synopsis ==
=== The Rape of the Vampire ===
Four sisters living in an old château are convinced that they are vampires. One believes she was raped by the villagers years before and is blind. Another is afraid of sunlight. They all react violently to crucifixes. The sisters are being manipulated by a sinister old man who alternates between admonishing them to kill newcomers that threaten their exposure and groping their breasts. The four seem to worship a bestial idol in the forest who speaks to them with a disembodied voice.

The newcomers are three Parisians, Thomas, Brigitte, and Marc, who have come to the countryside to cure the sisters of their so-called illness. They do not believe that the sisters are vampires and don't believe in vampires at all. Thomas is a psychoanalyst, determined to cure them of their madness. He believes it has been induced by the superstitious villagers, who have driven the confused women insane with their religious symbols and persecution. Thomas tries to convince them that crucifixes and sunlight won't harm them and that the blind sister can actually see. He takes all of this as proof that their vampirism is all in their minds. When one of the sisters falls for Thomas' charms, the old man orders another sister to kill him, Brigitte and Marc. When this fails, he unleashes the peasants, who brutally murder all the women they can find, including Brigitte.

Thomas asks one of the sisters to bite him to prove her wrong and discovers she is, in fact, a vampire and that his own preconceptions misled him. The two flee to the beach and are gunned down by Marc, who is distraught by Brigitte's death at the hands of the peasants.

=== Queen of the Vampires/The Vampire Woman ===
The vampire queen is introduced. She briefly arrives by boat to the beach where the dead couple lies. She commands her hooded cohort to grab the old man and pin him down to the slab of rock, then proceeds to sacrifice him, and licks the knife covered in his blood. The vampire queen tells her leading female minion to dismember the bodies of Thomas and the vampire sister so that they don't come back to life, but she fails. It is later revealed that she is in rebellion against the vampire queen. The blood from the old man revives Thomas and the vampire sister.

The human doctor who runs the demented clinic is under the supervision of the vampire queen and he has been secretly searching for a cure for vampirism.

The vampires abduct Brigitte's body from the cenotaph, and Thomas later discovers that Brigitte is alive. She tells him that he imagined the entire trip, but he doesn't believe her. He follows her to the hospital where she is listening to an instruction tape. He stops the tape and kills her.

The doctor's plot is later uncovered. While the vampire queen stages a ceremony to marry the doctor to his assistant, her minions strip the assistant and whip her on the beach. The malcontents have not bowed to her rule and the revolution explodes, which ends with the vampires being killed and the vampire queen poisoned. Thomas and the vampire wall themselves in the cellar to await death. They do not wish to feed on the living, but are too afraid that if they stay free, their thirst will drive them to murder, so they sacrifice themselves instead, ending their freedom in each other's arms.

== Cast ==
- Solange Pradel as Brigitte
- Bernard Letrou as Thomas
- Catherine Deville
- Ursule Pauly
- Nicole Romain as Marc
- Marquis Polho
- Louise Horn
- Doc Moyle
- Yolande Leclerc
- Philippe Druilette
- Jean Aron
- Mei Chen
- Edith Ponceau-Lardie
- Jean-Denis Bonan
- Jacqueline Sieger as the Vampire Queen (uncredited)
- Ariane Sapriel (uncredited)
- Alain Yves Beaujour (uncredited)
- Annie Merlin (uncredited)
- Oliver Rollin (uncredited)
- Barbara Girard (uncredited)
- Jean Rollin (uncredited)

== Production ==
Le Viol du Vampire opening at a French theatre

In 1967, French retailer Jean Lavie, owner of a Paris network of small theatres including The Scarlett, Styx and Midi Minuit, commissioned a short film from Rollin on the theme of vampires. It was to serve as a prologue to an old American fantasy film of the 1940s, The Vampire, a Creature of the Devil, which he had bought the rights to and planned to rebroadcast. At the time, Rollin was still an apprentice film director, having only done his early short films and documentaries, but he wanted to embark on more ambitious projects and specialize in particular in the fantasy genre. He accepted the proposal from Lavie enthusiastically. With producer Sam Selsky, he was given a budget of 200,000 francs, which gave him the opportunity to assemble a small team and start shooting the film.

=== Casting ===
Rollin could not bring in professional actors due to the low budget. Among the cast playing the four vampire sisters were Ursule Pauly, a model, and Nicole Romain, a stripper. Pradel, Letrou and Polho, who played the three heroes, had never acted in a movie before; nor had the rest of the cast. None had undergone training in drama except Ariane Sapriel.

=== Filming ===
The filming of Le Viol du Vampire began in 1967 and took place almost entirely around an old abandoned house which served as the home of the four vampire sisters. The surrounding woods and fields furnished the framework for the outdoor sequences. This abandoned house, Château de Gressy, was located in the Paris suburbs at Gressy, Claye-Souilly. According to Rollin, this château was destroyed in a fire. Later, the city hall of Gressy was built on this location. Only the death scene of Thomas and the vampire sister was not filmed in Île-de-France. Instead, Rollin chose Pourville-lès-Dieppe, a beach near Normandy which was dear to his heart since his teens and had already been used as a setting in 1958 for his first short film, Les Amours Jaunes (The Yellow Lovers). The beach was seen again on numerous occasions throughout the filming, and the same beach was used as a setting in his later films. During the scene, in which the four vampire sisters were attacked, the peasants were played by Polho and several members of the crew, who had been employed for the occasion as actors because Rollin could not hire extras.

== Release ==
=== Reception ===
On 27 May 1968, Le Viol du Vampire was released to theaters in Paris by Jean Lavie and his associates. Its release coincided with local political events, which resulted in it drawing large audiences. Due to strikes and riots, it was one of few theatrical productions available for viewing at the time. Screenings of the film unleashed taunts, jeers and threats of damage against Rollin.

Jean Rollin explained in an interview: "Le Viol was a terrible scandal here in Paris. People were really mad when they saw it. In Pigalle, they threw things at the screen. The principal reason was that nobody could understand the story".

=== Home media ===
Unlike other Rollin films, Le Viol du Vampire remained unreleased on VHS in France for a very long time, due to it being shot in black and white. It was not until 2000 that Norbert Moutier, a friend of the director, finally issued it on VHS via NG Mount International.

A VHS edition was released in the UK on 1 May 2000 by Salvation Films.

The film was released on DVD in the US on 19 March 2002 by Image Entertainment. It was presented in 1.66:1, which was not enhanced for widescreen televisions. Another DVD edition was released in France in 2003 by CRA. It was released again on DVD in Europe on October 20, 2007, by Encore Films in a restored version with a new aspect ratio of 1.78:1 and extra materials including a 28-page booklet.

Le viol du vampire was released on Blu-ray in the US via Redemption on 29 May 2012. The Blu-ray, as well as a DVD reissue, contained the film presented uncensored in its original 1.66:1 aspect ratio from a newly remastered negative in HD. Special features included an introduction from Rollin; two short films from Rollin (Les amours jaunes and Le pays loin); an alternate version of one scene; "Fragments of Pavements Under the Sand", documentary by Daniel Gouyette featuring interviews with Rollin, Jean-Denis Bonan and Jean-Pierre Bouyxou; additional interviews with Rollin and Jean-Loup Philippe; original theatrical trailers; and a 16-page booklet with an essay by Video Watchdog editor Tim Lucas.

== See also ==
- Vampire film
