= Perdues dans New York =

1989 film by Jean Rollin

- DVD cover
- Written by: Jean Rollin
- Directed by: Jean Rollin
- Starring: Adeline Abitbol; Funny Abitbol; Catherine Herengt; Catherine Lesret; Sophie Maret; Marie-Laurence; Mélissa; Nathalie Perrey; Catherine Rival
- Music by: Phillippe d'Aram
- Country of origin: France
- Original language: French

Production
- Editor: Janette Kronegger
- Running time: 52 minutes

Original release
- Release: 1989

Perdues dans New York (English: Lost in New York) is a 1989 French television film written and directed by Jean Rollin, who is most notable for his cult vampire films. In the 2010s, the film went viral when clips were used in an unofficial music video to Clams Casino's instrumental "I'm God".

== Premise ==
Two girls discover a magical wooden device, called a Moon Goddess, which allows them to travel through time and space. They imagine they are grown-up and see New York City. Meeting again with their memories as old women, after a dreamlike journey of self-discovery, they return to their days of youth.

== Home media ==
Perdues dans New York was released on DVD in the United Kingdom by Redemption Films on 16 July 2007 in a non-anamorphic 1.66:1 transfer with a Dolby 2.0 mono soundtrack. Extras included two of Rollin's early short films (Les Amours Jaunes and Les Pays Lion) and a stills gallery.

== Legacy ==
In July 2011, scenes from the film were cut together into an unofficial music video to Clams Casino's instrumental "I'm God", and uploaded onto YouTube by AceDaCreator. The video has since amassed over 25 million views, and the film's imagery has become synonymous with the song because of it. In April 2020, the song was officially released on streaming platforms, using a still from the film as its cover art, in a homage to AceDaCreator's video.
