= Jean Rollin =

French film director

- Jean Rollin
- Born: Jean Michel Rollin Roth Le Gentil; 3 November 1938; Neuilly-sur-Seine, Hauts-de-Seine, France
- Died: 15 December 2010 (aged 72); Paris, France
- Occupations: Director, actor, writer
- Years active: 1957–2010
- Spouse: Simone Rollin
- Children: 2
- Website: Official site

Jean Michel Rollin Roth Le Gentil (3 November 1938 – 15 December 2010) was a French film director, actor, and novelist best known for his work in the fantastique genre.

Rollin's career, spanning over fifty years, featured early short films and his achievements with his first four vampire classics Le viol du vampire (1968), La vampire nue (1970), Le frisson des vampires (1970), and Requiem pour un vampire (1971). Rollin's subsequent notable works include La rose de fer (1973), Lèvres de sang (1975), Les raisins de la mort (1978), Fascination (1979), and La morte vivante (1982).

His films are noted for their exquisite, if mostly static, cinematography, off-kilter plot progression, poetic dialogue, playful surrealism and recurrent use of well-constructed female lead characters. Outlandish dénouements and abstruse visual symbols were trademarks. Belied by high production values and precise craftsmanship, his films were made with little money, often against deadlines. In the mid-1970s, lack of regular work led the director to direct mostly pornographic films under various pseudonyms, an activity he continued until the early 1980s.

== Early life ==
Jean Rollin was born in Neuilly-sur-Seine (now Hauts-de-Seine), France, to Claude Louis René Rollin-Roth-Le Gentil, an actor and theatre director who went by the stage name Claude Martin, and his wife Denise (née Leffroi), an artists' model. His half-brother was actor Olivier Rollin.

== Career ==
Rollin had a passion for cinema from an early age. He saw his first film during the second World War. It was Capitaine Fracasse, a 1942 film directed by Abel Gance. Rollin decided he wanted to make films when he grew up; his father, a theatre actor, was a heavy influence on him. During his teens, he developed an obsession for American serials and read comic books.

When he was 16, he found a job at Les Films de Saturne, helping write invoices while earning some money though he wanted to be involved in cinema. They specialized in creating opening and closing credits and short cartoons, but real films were also shot such as industrial shorts and documentaries. Rollin was part of the crew in a short documentary about Snecma, a big factory in France which built motors and planes. He arranged the tracking shots, laid the tracks, checked the electricity, and helped the cameraman.

When Rollin did his military service for the French army, he worked as an editor in the cinema department alongside Claude Lelouch. They worked on army commercials with Lelouch directing and Rollin editing. They also made two films, Mechanographie, a documentary, and La Guerre de Silence (The War of Silence), a fiction film.

In 1958 after leaving the army, he directed his first short film Les Amours Jaunes (The Yellow Lovers). He shot it on a 35mm Maurigraphe camera, and used a beach in Dieppe as his location, the same beach used in his later films.

=== 1960s ===
In 1960, Rollin decided to direct his first feature film, but later abandoned the project as he had no money to finish it. His next short, Ciel de Cuivre (Sky of Copper), was directed in 1961, and was quite surreal though it told a sentimental story. He did not finish the film because he ran out of money and it was not very good. The footage is now lost.

In 1962, he was as an assistant director on the film Un Cheval pour Deux (A Horse for Two), which was not a great experience for him, and he decided to approach cinema in a different way. In the early sixties, Rollin became interested in politics and made a short documentary in 1964 called Vivre en Espagne (Life in Spain). It was about Generalissimo Francisco Franco, thirty minutes were filmed but he risked a lot to get it made. Rollin and the crew found themselves pursued by the police and just managed to make it back into France. Jean also directed a short film in 1965 called Les Pays Loins.

Rollin prior to receiving the Life Time Achievement Award at the Montreal Fantasia Film Festival on 15 July 2007

In 1968, Jean directed his first feature Le viol du vampire (The Rape of the Vampire). At the time he was still not known in the world of cinema, having only done a few short films and documentaries. The film was shot on a low budget, and consisted of two parts because it was originally intended to be another short film; the second part was later added so that it was released as a feature film. The release of Le Viol caused public scandal and outrage, his strong inspiration of American serials did not attract viewers. It was released during the events of May 1968, and due to the riots, it was a rare theatrical production at the time. Rollin himself was also threatened due to this scandal, because of this, he briefly decided to give up making films.

His second feature La vampire nue (The Nude Vampire) was his first film in colour. It was mostly inspired by the 1916 film Judex, and also surrealism in general. Rollin wanted to do something a little more temperate than Le Viol, a traditional mystery film. Anyway, as he himself stated, it came to be the same kind of film as his first feature, it also has the same spirit. La vampire nue also became notable in that it introduced Catherine and Marie-Pierre Castel, twin sisters who frequently collaborated with Rollin during the early years of his career.

Following La vampire nue, Rollin found himself in a financial crisis and having suffered an accident during production which left him traumatized, the circumstances took a positive turn when he met with producer Monique Nathan, owner of the Films Moderns company. Nathan having put her faith and support in Rollin, turned down several a number of the most prominent French New Wave filmmakers for financing and instead entirely supported Rollin as both a producer and a co-screenwriter for his next project, Le Frisson des Vampires (Shiver of the Vampires) which was heavily influenced by the trappings of the hippie movement. It did however retain many of the themes one could expect from a Rollin film and one of the most iconic scenes ever to appear in a Rollin film: actress Dominique emerging from an old grandfather clock. Production for the film took place in an abandoned castle in Soissons, a commune in the Aisne department of Picardy.

=== 1970s ===
1971, Rollin directed Requiem pour un vampire (Requiem for a Vampire), which became one of his most successful films, and it was another low budget production, which almost took no money to produce. There was no dialogue in the first forty minutes of the film, this was in Rollin's words to make the "ultimate naive film", simplifying the story, direction and cinematography. Initially, Rollin had Catherine Castel in mind to play one of the leading ladies in Requiem; however, Castel was unable to accept the role due to being pregnant, which forced Rolling to offer the role to Maire-Pierre. The second female lead was portrayed by Mireille D'argent whom Rollin chose after she was introduced to him by an agent. Rollin discovered that D'argent's agent was collecting her wages, which prompted him to contact a lawyer and have her wages returned to her. Requiem was filmed in the small village of Crêvecoeur. The graveyard was located outside the village on a knoll. The castle, a historical place entirely furnished with genuine antiques, all of which were worth a fortune, had been rented from the duchess of Roche-Guyon. It wasn't her castle that Rollin and the crew were interested in, but the ruins of the dungeon above, that overlooked the entire area. Following this, Rollin made a temporary departure to creating films associated with the erotic vampire genre.

A beach, located in Dieppe, is frequently used in several of Rollin's films.

Having risen to success during his early vampire era, Rollin embarked on a different approach to filmmaking. Rollin financed his 1973 film La rose de fer (The Iron Rose) himself and was convinced that it would become a failure, leading to financial ruin. Prior to production, he engaged in a deal with Impex films to direct a number of hardcore porn films in the near future in order to produce La rose de fer and ensure that it would not fail. The story follows two young lovers (Françoise Pascal and Hugues Quester) who meet at a wedding reception and agree to go on a date, for which they decide to take a walk in an enormous cemetery. As they make love in an underground tomb, strange and bizarre occurrences take place above ground. As night falls, they frantically try to escape from the cemetery, and with no luck, end up where they started. They are slowly overcome with hysteria and paranoia which brings about their mortality. The film was shot in the city of Amiens over a four-week period and premiered at the 2nd Annual Convention of the Fantastique in Paris in April 1973 and was initially met with a negative reception and as a result, Rollin was unable to find anyone to back his future personal projects.

Rollin directed the adult sex films Jeunes filles impudiques (Schoolgirl Hitchhikers), Le sourire vertical (The Vertical Smile), and Tout le monde il en a deux (Bacchanales sexuelles or Fly Me the French Way) under the pseudonym Michel Gentil as he was financially unable to come up with a budget for another mainstream feature film. However, in 1974 Rollin directed the horror adventure and self-proclaimed "Expressionist" film Les démoniaques which was inspired by the adventure classics he had enormous admiration for in his youth. The film includes Joëlle Cœur and Willy Braque whom Rollin worked with on Jeunes filles impudiques. The story follows two young women who have been involved in a shipwreck and are brutally raped and murdered by a group of rogue pirates, only to be resurrected after making love to the devil so that they can seek their revenge. Rollin had many disputes with the producers of the film during production of the project as they insisted on a low budget. He was hospitalized for two weeks following the work due to mental and physical exhaustion. Further problems would arise including the working title, Les diablesses, having to be changed as the copyright was not free of charge and with the Castel Twins being unavailable for the roles of the avenging ghosts, the parts where offered to inexperienced actresses Lieva Lone and Patricia Hermenier.

Rollin made a brief return to the erotic vampire genre in 1975 when he wrote and directed Lèvres de sang (Lips of Blood). The film includes all the surreal dreamlike aspects for which Rollin's films are known. The story follows a young man named Frederic who is on a quest to find a woman dressed in white following the discovery of a photo of a ruined château. The photo triggers a suppressed childhood memory, which may be a dream. Despite his mother trying to convince him that it was dream, Frederic becomes fixated and obsessed with location the castle and the woman that may be inside. Lèvres de sang features Jean-Loup Philippe, whom Rollin co-wrote the film with, Annie Belle, and Nathalie Perrey, whom Rollin had worked with frequently throughout his career as a credited actress, script writer and editor. The film also sees the return of the Castel Twins as part of a group of vampires.

Due to the commercial failures of both La rose de fer and Lèvres de sang, Rollin again had no choice but to direct another adult sex film for financial reasons as there was no possible way to produce a feature film for the foreseeable future. Phantasmes (Once Upon a Virgin) was written and directed by Rollin for release in 1975 and was the first and only pornographic film in which he was credited under his own name because he liked what he did in the film. Rollin mentioned that the film is his "first and final attempt at a serious" adult film, wanting to create a film that didn't just "poke fun at sex". The score for Phantasmes is considered one of the films best attributes, courtesy of composer Didier William Lepauw of Lèvres de sang. (Note: Richey, Jeremy (23 February 2009). "The Hidden Cinema of Jean Rollin: Phantasmes (1975)". Fascination: The Jean Rollin Experience.)

Between 1976 and 1977, his work consisted strictly of hardcore pornographic films as there was a lack of money and producers reluctant to fund any new mainstream projects due to his previous commercial failures. Seven porn films were produced within this period under his pseudonym Michel Gentil, and one of which, Suce moi vampire (Suck Me Vampire: the hardcore version of Lèvres de sang), he credited himself as Michel Gand. His 1976 hardcore film Douces pénétraitions marked the final time the Castel Twins would appear together working for Rollin, and the final time Marie-Pierre would work with him altogether. Catherine would continue to appear in his films for several years.

Jean Rollin returned in 1978, when he wrote and directed Les raisins de la mort (The Grapes of Death) which has been considered the first French gore film. It has been described as one of the most pivotal films in his entire canon (Note: Richey, Jeremy (3 April 2009). "The Cinema of Jean Rollin: Le Raisins de la Mort (The Grapes of Death) 1978". Fascination: The Jean Rollin Experience.) and is seen as a rare departure from his usual dreamlike and poetic works. Following the negative reception and commercial failures of his previous films and having to direct pornographic pictures, Rollin eventually gained financial backing to produce his next mainstream feature. The story here features a young woman, Elisabeth (Marie-Georges Pascal) who is travelling to a secluded vineyard in the mountains owned by her fiancé. There she discovers that the local residents who occupy the village have been transformed into mindless zombies by a dangerous pesticide which contaminated the grapes growing at the vineyard following a wine festival which occurred some days before.

The film includes pornographic actress Brigitte Lahaie, in her first mainstream role, as Rollin was the first French director to recognise her acting capabilities and offer her much more prominent roles in his subsequent films. Rollin stated that Les raisins de la mort was his "first traditional, almost conventional, production" which was because the film acquired solid finances with made a change and with special effects supplied by Italian experts. Claude Becognee served as director of photography which added to the film's success. Rollin would credit much of the film's success to Marie-Georges Pascal's portrayal of Elisabeth, whom he would recall delivered a very "moving" performance in the film. Les raisins de la mort was shot in the deserted mountain region of Les Cévennes.

The film is often referred to as being influenced by George A. Romero's Night of the Living Dead. However, it has more in common with Jorge Grau's 1974 Spanish-Italian horror film Let Sleeping Corpses Lie (also known as The Living Dead at Manchester Morgue). The film does not follow the tradition zombie method, instead, Rollin's zombies centre on madness with a strong environmentally conscious message. As he has mentioned, the zombies "have retained their consciousness" and they finally "suffer for what they are". With the film as a notable success, Rollin would continue with pornographic films under a new pseudonym, Robert Xavier, while retaining the Michel Gentil credit.

One of Rollin's best-known collaborations with actress Brigitte Lahaie in an iconic scene from Fascination (1979).

In 1979, and now established as a somewhat successful director, Rollin created Fascination in which he returned to the roots of the fantastique genre his early works are known for. The film is inspired by the short story Un verre de sang (A Glass of Blood) from French poet Jean Lorrain with tells the tale of wealthy French people, who, at the turn of the century, begin to drink the blood of bulls in order to cure anemia. The title of the film refers to and pays homage to a French magazine of the same name which is dedicated to different forms of eroticism in art. (Note: Richey, Jeremy (15 May 2009). "The Cinema of Jean Rollin: Fascination (1979)". Fascination: The Jean Rollin Experience.) Rollin's story of Fascination differs slightly from that of Lorrain's novel, in that, in the year 1905 a group of wealthy Parisian women arrive at an abattoir to drink the blood of an ox as it is believed to be a curative for anemia. The central story follows two lovers Elizabeth and Eva (Franca Maï and Brigitte Lahaie respectively), chambermaids-in-waiting who reside at a deserted castle and are suddenly interrupted by a thief named Mark (Jean-Pierre Lemaire), who takes refuge at the castle in order to hide from a group of thieves he has stolen coins from. When Mark makes love to Eva, she is forced to go outside and confront the thieves in the nearby stables to make a deal; she is forced to have sex with one of the male thieves and subsequently they are murdered by Eva in an iconic scene with Eva wielding a scythe. It is soon revealed that Elizabeth and Eva are expecting a group of women to arrive where sensual love making takes place and the women are revealed to devour the blood of humans.

The film is often said to be of the vampire genre. However, it does not feature the elements which his early vampire films are known for, aside from the drinking of blood. The production of Fascination was not without complications; as it may have been one of the easiest films to shoot in Rollin's experience, despite the low budget, the story was met with disapproval from the film's producer, Christine Renaud. As Rollin himself had said, the "co-producer wanted (him) to make a very explicit sex film-straight exploitation fare without too much emphasis on the fantastical elements". Rollin overcame these obstacles and made the film he wanted. Additional members of the crew included Nathalie Perrey, who designed the costumes, and Philippe D'Aram, who provided the score. It was predicted that Fascination would lead to success, as did Les raisins de la mort. However, in a setback, one of the directors of UGC, a huge French distributor, cancelled the screenings Rollin had been promised. As the film was yet another financial failure for Rollin, he had little choice but to resume his pornographic works with continued until the end of the 1970s.

=== 1980s ===
As Jean Rollin's career continued into the 1980s, he started off the decade with the release of La nuit des traquées (The Night of the Hunted) in the summer of 1980. This mainstream feature saw the return of pornographic actress Brigitte Lahaie, in her first leading role in a Rollin film. Upon the film's debut, it was considered a failure. However, it eventually garnered somewhat of a following in later years, as several of Rollin's works have done in the past. La nuit des traquées was shot in less than ten days on an extremely low budget, similar to his pornographic films. Rollin admitted that "I was tired of X-films", as the film was intended to be another hardcore sex film and told the producer "if you want a horror film for the same cost", then, "I can make it in 9 days". Rollin came to the decision to cast actors of the pornographic industry in the picture in order to keep production cost down and to give the actors the opportunity to show their legitimate talent. (Note: Richey, Jeremy (16 June 2009). "The Cinema of Jean Rollin: La Nuit des Traquées (The Night of the Hunted)". Fascination: The Jean Rollin Experience.) The film stands as a noteworthy piece of work in Rollin's canon, as it differs from any of his previous work and is a departure from the fantastique genre that his films are greatly known for; the film is often poetic, yet it serves a realistic tone and chilling atmosphere. Lahaie portrays the character of Elizabeth, a young woman discovered wandering around in the rain on a dark night, by a man named Robert (Vincent Gardère). As Elizabeth has no recollection of why she is there and frequently continues to lose her memory every few minutes, Robert drives her to his apartment in the city where they make love. The following morning while Robert goes to work, a doctor named Francis and a woman named Solange (Bernard Papineau and Rachel Mhas) locate Elizabeth and accompany her back to the clinic where she has escaped from. It is revealed that Elizabeth and fellow patients are currently confined to the hospital for a deteriorating disease in which they have been contaminated by an environmental accident.

In addition to Lahaie, Rollin had actress Martine Delva in mind for the role of Lahaie's character's friend Véronique. Delva was introduced to Rollin and Lionel Wallman by actor Alain Plumey and when offered the role, she accepted the role. Prior to production, which was intended to take place in La Défense district, she was involved in a serious car accident which left her unconscious with a broken leg and she died within one week from her injuries. The role of Véronique then offered to Dominique Journet. Pornographic actress Catherine Greiner and frequent collaborator, Natalie Perrey appeared as patients at the hospital.

In the early year of the film, it was met with a negative reception and did not please audiences during its release; not receiving a successful response at the Stigès Festival. It did however receive positive reaction when it was screened at a festival in Trieste, where it was applauded and viewed as a highly subversive work. Rollin himself had stated that "I don't think it is a very good film and it is probably one of my worst" and that if he could remake just one of his films it would be La nuit des traquées.

In 1980, Rollin directed the Spanish zombie horror feature, Le lac des morts vivants (commonly known as Zombie Lake) under the pseudonym J.A. Lazer. Jésus Franco was intended to direct the film, and with an unfortunate turn of events he became unavailable. At this point, Rollin was planning to take a vacation, and on the morning he was expecting to leave, he received a phone call from the production company Eurociné asking if he would be interested directing the horror film which was due to start filming the next morning, as Franco could not be located. Rollin agreed, and arrived on set the following morning. The company could not attach Rollin's name to the project due to issues with the contact, as a Spanish name had to be credited for the film and J.A. Lazer was chosen. Le lac des morts vivants was released in 1981 and Rollin admitted that he never really cared for the film. It contains most of the elements which one would expect from a Franco film, and includes Franco's frequent collaborators such as actors Howard Vernon, Nadine Pascal, Antonio Mayans and Alain Petit, and composer Daniel White. Photography for the film was courtesy of Max Monteillet, who Rollin would later work with in several projects. Rollin himself made a cameo appearance in the film. (Note: Richey, Jeremy (11 August 2009). "The Hidden Cinema of Jean Rollin: 1980's Le Lac Des Mortes Vivantes (Zombie Lake)". Fascination: The Jean Rollin Experience.)

In 1981, Rollin returned with the drama film, Les paumées du petit matin (The Escapees or The Runaways). It marks a departure to the usual horror tones which his films are notable for, and here mixes drama with elements of adventure, thriller and crime, while maintaining erotic and poetic themes and remains a distinctive and unique piece of work from Rollin. The story follows two young women who are confined to mental asylum in the countryside; Michelle (Laurence Dubas), a troubled teenager, has been returned to the asylum after escaping and is forced into a straitjacket. She manages to get the attention of Marie (Christiane Coppé), a teenage girl who is who sits in the garden on a rocking chair, while staring into space and never speaks, by dropping a tin food dish from her bedroom window and the sound somehow brings Marie back to reality. They escape from the asylum and encounter a group of burlesque dancers, a bar singer and a group of women who proceed to rape Marie. Their journey ends when they become involved in crime and death. The cast includes Rollin's usual collaborators Louise Dhour, Nathalie Perrey, Brigitte Lahie and a cameo appearance from Rollin himself. Les paumées du petit matin unfortunately failed to receive a proper theatrical in 1981 which resulted in it being one of the most difficult Rollin films to find in future. It did however receive its first DVD release in 2009 in the United States courtesy of Redemption Films, with a subsequent release in the United Kingdom. Again with a limited budget an issues with the script, Rollin stated that there were many problems with the production right from the beginning; that it was "an incredible mess", filled with "clichés and platitudes of melodrama." Later reviews of the film have been quite positive; Cathal Tohill and Pete Tombs would go so far as to call it a schizophrenic work in their wonderful Immoral Tales, but they would also note that "the beginning and end are pure Rollin" and "what is good in (The Escapees) is very good." (Note: Richey, Jeremy (21 September 2009). "The Cinema of Jean Rollin: Les Paumees Du Petit Matin (The Escapees)". requiemforjeanrollin.blogspot.com.)

Rollin in 1982

His 1982 film, La morte vivante (The Living Dead Girl) was his most commercial and successful work since Les raisins de la mort. In addition to its small budget, Rollin again had to contend with producers to construct a film that he wanted, as they required another zombie piece. He was reluctant to do so and was influenced to create a film with combinations from his previous works. Rollin described that the living dead girl is sort of a vampire woman who devours the blood of humans, taking the idea from his vampire works, but not exactly making her a vampire. The gore is a notable aspect taken from Les raisins de la mort. His usual poetic, supernatural and horror themes are still present within the film. Rollin created the story of a young woman named Catherine Valmont (Françoise Blanchard) who has been dead and buried in her family vault beneath the Valmont mansion for the past two years. As three thieves enter the vaults and plan to rob Catherine and her deceased relative of their jewellery as they lay in their coffins, an earth tremor occurs, which suddenly resurrects Catherine. Unaware of her surroundings, she must acquire human victims and drink their blood to prevent her descending into madness and possibly death, with drifting in and out of childhood memories of her childhood friend, Hélène (Marina Pierro). During which, a photographer, Barbara (Carina Barone), becomes fascinated by Catherine when she discovers her and thinks she is quite peculiar, and sets out to uncover a mystery. Catherine's childhood friend, Hélène is intending to buy the Valmont mansion, which is currently on the market and a strange phone call leads her to the home where she discovers that Catherine is alive and the bodies of the thieves and the real estate agent and her boyfriend. Trying to convince herself that Catherine did not actually die, she realises that she has returned from the dead and must help her by bringing her unsuspecting victims. Some of the financing for the film was courtesy of Jacques Raif, who co-wrote the feature. The film's photographer Pierre LeBlond, found a castle which would become the Valmont mansion, which they rented. The castle provided accommodation for the cast and crew, in which the owner offered to cook. According to Rollin, the owner insisted on being referred to as "His Lordship" and that he was very difficult to get along with Actress, Françoise Blanchard was introduced to Rollin by Fanny Magier, a co-star actress who appeared in the film. When Blanchard arrived, Rollin was unsure whether to offer her the role of Catherine due to the fact that in the first scene in which her character is resurrected, Blanchard appeared wearing trousers which wasn't required for the scene and Rollin did not ask her to remove them. She did however receive the role due to good contact. Blanchard showed great professionalism in her role and in one particular scene, the final scene of the film, in which Blanchard's character cries and screams after devouring her childhood friend, the crew became concerned over her mental state as they thought she has descended into madness. She gave an amazing performance for the role. During the preparation of the film, Rollin had been to Rome with Lionel Wallman to find an actress to portray the role of Hélène. Rollin had Teresa Ann Savoy in mind for the role, whom he was greatly impressed with. After speaking with Savoy and showing her a script for a pornographic picture which was in English and devoid of interest and not for La morte vivante, as she didn't speak French, she refused the role and told her agent that she would never in her life shoot with a guy like him. His second choice was actress Marina Pierro, a recurring collaborator with director Walerian Borowczyk, whom Rollin instantly liked. Pierro accepted the role. In the role of the photographers, American actor Mike Marshall, whom Rollin enjoyed working with during the production received the role of Greg and Canadian actress Carina Barone, was offered the role of Barbara due to a previous actress who featured in Les paumées du petit matin turning it down as she unmistakable believed that it was supposedly an erotic film. The film was a commercial success within theatres and received quite a positive reception, especially in Italy. Upon its release, Rollin was betrayed by a dishonest distributor who premiered in a select number of small theatres behind his back, as the film deserved a much larger audience in highly established theatres. However, La morte vivante was selected in many festivals which gave the film little success, particularly in Rome where Rollin's friend, Andriano Pintaldi presented the film in his festival where it was given the public's award.

After directing three additional pornographic features following La morte Vivante, Rollin's next feature film, Les trottoirs de Bangkok (The Sidewalks of Bangkok) was released in 1984. It is a rare production for Rollin, in that it does not contain his traditional fare of the supernatural, horror, or the fantastique genre. It is highly influenced by Rollin's childhood passion for old serials as it contains themes of adventure, crime and mystery, comic-book fantasy and is inspired by the 1932 Boris Karloff classic The Mask of Fu Manchu. The leading protagonist of the film is pornographic actress, Yoko, whom Rollin mentioned that he had "never worked with an actor who was so open-minded and easy to direct." She portrays the role of Eva, who is on the run from the French Secret Service and a rival syndicate who desperate require a deadly chemical which she possesses. This is her only mainstream role outside of the pornographic industry. Françoise Blanchard returns in her second film with Rollin, as she appears in the role of Claudine, a woman who works for the syndicate and is forced to locate Eva and hand her over to her villainous boss, instead she chooses to protect Eva. Supporting cast includes Argentina actor Gérard Landry, Israeli actress Brigitte Borghese, Jean-Pierre Bouyxou, whom Rollin has worked with on numerous occasions throughout his career, and a cameo appearance from Rollin. On a limited budget, and again working with producer Lionel Wallman and cinematographer Claude Becognee, the production of Les trottoris de Bangkok was filmed in several locations, many of which were not given permission to; the Chinese Quarter of Porte d'Italie and on the docks where goods from Asia were unloaded, an abandoned den near the Champs-Élysées, and on part of the French railroad. The film became a success and Rollin admitted that despite the fact that the film was a mess, he said "the entire shoot was great fun." Working with Yoko prompted Rollin to write a new film which included her alongside Brigitte Lahaie which unfortunately never became a film as Yoko retired from acting in the early nineties. (Note: Richey, Jeremy (26 January 2010). "The Cinema of Jean Rollin: Les Trottoirs de Bangkok (The Sidewalks of Bangkok)". Fascination: The Jean Rollin Experience.)

Rollin received minor work following Les trottoirs de Bangkok; in 1985, he resumed his pseudonymous work as "Michel Gentil" with a non-pornographic feature, the slapstick comedy, Ne prends pas les poulets pour des pigeons which reunited Brigitte Borghese and Gérard Landry from his previous film, and included French actor and comedian Popeck. Rollin was hired, and therefore his real name was not attached to the project. In 1988, he received the uncredited directorial role in the erotic sequel Emmanuelle 6, for which he wrote the screenplay. The film suffered many flaws during production under direction from Bruno Zincone and Rollin became involved in an attempt to salvage what he could and see that production was completed for the financiers. (Note: Richey, Jeremy (21 March 2010). "The Hidden Cinema of Jean Rollin: Emmanuelle 6 (1988)". Fascination: The Jean Rollin Experience.)

At the end of the decade, Rollin created Perdues dans New York (Lost in New York) which was produced in 1989. Rollin mentioned that the film was "an anthology of all the themes and obsessive images I have used in my films", and that it, "brought to an end what had been started within the previous 13 films." A friend of Rollin's who was a producer insisted his help as he need location shots of New York an upcoming TV series he was working on. Rollin agreed and travelled to New York with a small film crew and a 16mm camera. While filming the shots, Rollin was struck with an idea to improvise a theme in which two young women are separated and desperately search for one another. He produced the film with a runtime of just under one hour and immediately struggled to find distribution, whether it be released to theatres or television. It was difficult to find distribution for independent and exploitation pictures in the late eighties as in a time of revolution and change, distributors would only pick up more commercial and high-budget film. It was not until the following years that the film found its audience on the home video market. (Note: Richey, Jeremy (17 April 2010). "The Cinema of Jean Rollin: Lost in New York (1991)". Fascination: The Jean Rollin Experience.) Initially, Perdues dans New York was to be the final production of Rollin's canon as he has become ill during this period, and he expressed gratitude to his many fan by paying homage to his early works.

Despite his intentions to retire from directing following Perdues dans New York, his final film of the 1980s, Killing Car (working title Femme dangereuse) was produced in 1989. It is a revenge thriller and one of his most underrated and overlooked works. Initially intended to be a softcore production under the Michel Gentil pseudonym, Rollin attached his own name to the project and made it one of his most personal and self-referential of all his works. The film was shot on 16mm and in less than a week on a minimal budget of under $100,000. Australian model Tiki Tsang, originally of Brisbane, Queensland, had been residing in Paris, France for sometime when she was discovered by Rollin and offered her the role of "The Car Woman", a strange woman who steals an old Buick and proceeds to kill a number of people to seek revenge for a past tragedy. The part of "The Car Woman" was written especially for Tsang in what is the only film credit to her name. Killing Car gives nod to previous Rollin works including Tsang emerging from a grandfather clock (as did Dominique in an iconic scene from Les frisson des vampires). Max Monteillet returned as cinematographer and Philippe Brejean provided the score. Cast includes recurring collaborators Jean-Pierre Bouyxou and Jean-Loup Philippe. Following the production, Rollin was hospitalized due to exhaustion and started editing the film after his recovery. The editing process lasted two years. (Note: Richey, Jeremy (20 June 2010). "The Cinema of Jean Rollin: Killing Car (1993)". Fascination: The Jean Rollin Experience.) Several problems would arise during post-production, as the film found it difficult to receive distribution, like Perdues dans New York, if it could not receive a theatrical distribution, Rollin would settle for a video or television release. The film was eventually released in 1993. It was announced that no usable print or negative of the film exists today, and all known film negatives are considered lost.

=== 1990s ===
Rollin's final adult production came in 1994 when he made a brief return to direct (uncredited) and wrote the scenario for Le Parfume de Mathilde (The Scent of Mathilde). Rollin was initially required as a screenwriter for the production due to the fact that he was to replace producer Marc Dorcel's in-house auteur Michele Ricaud, who has just recently passed away. However, Rollin became co-director of the made-for-video film. Following his final time working on a sex film, Rollin later returned to his traditional works when he would go on to resume what he was best known for. (Note: Richey, Jeremy (25 July 2010). "The Hidden Cinema of Jean Rollin: The Scent of Mathilda (1994)". Fascination: The Jean Rollin Experience.)

Rollin continued his career into the 1990s, following what was intended to be a brief return in 1994 when he directed and wrote a final pornographic film. He remained true to form for what were to be his final years of film making, and his next feature went into production in 1995; Les deux orphelines vampires (The Two Orphan Vampires) saw the return of his most recognizable work, and his first vampire film since 1975's Levres de sang. With the then recent increase in popularity of Rollin's works, and with the resurgence with the vampire genre in general, most notable with Bram Stoker's Dracula, this prompted Rollin to create a new vampire feature, quite different from Francis Ford Coppola's 1992 blockbuster, as he stated that it was "not a good film at all", and that "it just doesn't work for one second". The idea of the film was based upon Rollin's novel of the same name and went into production in June 1995 for a mere ₣3,000,000, which is actually more than his prior works received. Locations for the shoot included four days in New York at the beginning, with the remaining three weeks in Paris. Cinematography was provided by Norbert Marfaing-Sintes, who previously worked with Italian director Duccio Tessari, as Max Monteillet was not available. Nathalie Perrey introduced Rollin to Marfaing-Sintes, as she had experience working with Marfaing-Sintes in many films; to show his gratitude, Rollin offered Perrey a role in Les deux orphelines vampires. The leading roles were offered to two inexperienced actresses, Alexandra Pic and Isabelle Teboul, whom Rollin choose while answering a newspaper ad they had printed. Brigitte Lahaie received a minor role in the film. Following an extensive period in post-production, the film was eventually released on 9 July 1997.

His next directorial feature, La fiancée de Dracula (The Fiancée of Dracula) went into production in 1999. Rollin had written the screenplay for the film, as he did with many of his previous works. During which time, Rollin was receiving dialysis for kidney disease and for periods of time, did not remain with the film crew and production was shared with Jean-Noël Delamarre in his absence, while Rolling was staying at a hotel in Caen. Filming locations included the islands of Chausey where the majority of the filming took place, a cemetery in Épinay-Champlâtreux, a castle in Blandy, Seine-et-Marne, and port of Pourville-lès-Dieppes. Long-time collaborators Brigitte Lahaie, Catherine Castel and Nathalie Perrey returned for prominent roles in the film. Rollin's niece, Sandrine Thoquet appeared in the film as a young vampire burned by the rays of the sun. Following production, Rollin received a kidney transplant in October 2000 during the post-production which lasted for almost two years. The film was successfully shown in theatres on 14 August 2002, for which Rollin was not completely satisfied of the release date. However, he was pleased that it was released to theaters and was somewhat well received.

== Personal life and death ==
Rollin was married to Simone Rollin Roth Le Gentil (née Morel), with whom he had two sons, Serge and Carel. He was married to Simone until his death.

Rollin died on 15 December 2010 after a long battle with cancer and was survived by his wife Simone, son Serge and granddaughter Gabrielle. He is buried at Père Lachaise Cemetery in Paris. Rollin's son, Carel (1973–2001), and his wife, Simone (1934–2016), rest alongside him.

== Selected filmography ==
The following list consists of Jean Rollin's mainstream works as both director and writer and not of his pseudonymous or pornographic works. For a complete list of his entire work, including producer and acting credits, see full filmography.

Original title	Year	Director	Writer	English Title	Ref
Le viol du vampire	1968	Yes	Yes	The Rape of the Vampire	
La vampire nue	1970	Yes	Yes	The Nude Vampire	
Le frisson des vampires	1971	Yes	Yes	The Shiver of the Vampires	
Requiem pour un vampire	1971	Yes	Yes	Requiem for a Vampire	
La rose de fer	1973	Yes	Yes	The Iron Rose	
Les démoniaques	1974	Yes	Yes	The Demoniacs	
Lèvres de sang	1975	Yes	Yes	Lips of Blood	
Les raisins de la mort	1978	Yes	Yes	The Grapes of Death	
Fascination	1979	Yes	Yes	Fascination	
La nuit des traquées	1980	Yes	Yes	The Night of the Hunted	
Le lac des morts vivants	1980	Yes	Yes	Zombie Lake	
Les paumées du petit matin	1981	Yes	Yes	The Escapees	
La morte vivante	1982	Yes	No	The Living Dead Girl	
Les trottoirs de Bangkok	1984	Yes	No	The Sidewalks of Bangkok	
Perdues dans New York	1989	Yes	Yes	Lost in New York	
Killing Car	1993	Yes	No	Killing Car	
Les deux orphelines vampires	1997	Yes	Yes	The Two Orphan Vampires	
La fiancée de Dracula	2002	Yes	Yes	The Fiancée of Dracula	
La nuit des horloges	2007	Yes	Yes	The Night of Clocks	
Le masque de la Méduse	2009	Yes	Yes	The Mask of Medusa	

== Bibliography ==
- Coulthart, John (8 December 2014). "Review of Saga de Xam by Nicolas Devil (1967)". { feuilleton }.
- Rollin, Jean (1990). Le temps d'un visage. Éd. Saint-Germain de Prés. ISBN 2-243-03253-8.
- — (1993). Les deux orphelines vampires. Fleuve Noir. ISBN 978-2-265001-11-4. Other titles in the same series include Anissa, Les Voyageuses, Les Pillardes, Les Incendiaires
- — (1996). Ombres vives. Éd. Saint-Germain-des-Prés. ISBN 978-2-243-03542-1.
- — (1998). Les dialogues sans fin: précédés de quelques souvenirs sur George Bataille, Maurice Blanchot et Michel Fardoulis-Lagrange. Éd. Mirandole. ISBN 978-2-912965-10-3.
- — (1998). Cauchemar d'anniversaire. R. de Surtis. ISBN 978-2-912271-25-9.
- — (1998). Monseigneur Rat roman. Paris: Sortilèges. ISBN 978-2-251-49126-4.
- — (1998). La cabriole a disparu. Illustrated by Michel Solliec. Le Faouët: Liv'éditions. ISBN 978-2-910781-66-8.
- — (1998). Enfer privé. Belles lettres. ISBN 978-2-251-82004-0.
- — (1998). La statue de chair. Belles lettres. ISBN 978-2-251-82007-1.
- — (1999). La promeneuse romans. Belles lettres. ISBN 978-2-251-49137-0.
- — (2001). Vies et aventures de Jean-Pierre Bouyxou. Éd. Films ABC. ISBN 978-2-84672-009-0.
- — (2001). Tuatha. Belles lettres. ISBN 978-2-251-49154-7.
- — (2001). Gargouillis glauques (Pour une fontaine de feu). R. de surtis. ISBN 978-2-912271-98-3.
- — (2001). La petite fille au cerceau. Éd. Films ABC. ISBN 978-2-84672-010-6.
- — (2003). Estelle et Edwige, les demoiselles de l'étrange. Paris: E-dite. ISBN 978-2-84608-108-5.
- — (2004). Rien n'estvrai. Éd. Films ABC. ISBN 978-2-915160-02-4.
- — (2004). Jean-Pierre Bouyxou contre la femme au masque rouge. Paris: E-dite : Films ABC. ISBN 978-2-84608-121-4.
- — (2004). Les voleuses de foudre. Éd. Films ABC. ISBN 978-2-915160-00-0.
- — (2006). Alice et Aladin détectives de l'impossible. Éd. Films ABC. ISBN 978-2-915160-03-1.
- — (2005). Déraison. Éd. Films ABC. ISBN 978-2-915160-04-8.
- — (2005). Bestialité. Oulon: Éd. Nuit d'avril. ISBN 978-2-35072-015-9.
- — (2007). La petite Ogresse. Films ABC. ISBN 978-2-91516-007-9.
- — (2008). MoteurCoupez!: mémoires d'un cinéaste singulier. ISBN 978-2-84608-253-2.
- — (2009). Bille de clown. Paris: E-dite. ISBN 978-2-84608-254-9.
- — (2010). Jean Rollin: Écrits complets Volume 1. Paris: Édite. ISBN 978-2-84608-277-8.
- — (2011). Jean Rollin: Écrits complets Volume 2. E/dite. ISBN 978-2-84608-281-5.
