= Sylvia Bourdon =

French activist

- Born: Sylvia van Ginneken; 29 January, 1949; Koln, Germany
- Occupations: Businesswoman, activist, former pornographic actress, artist.
- Known for: Adult film career, pro-European activist, Graphic Ecu Competition (GCE) founder.

Sylvia Bourdon (born 1949) is a French-German businesswoman and former pornographic actress. She gained prominence in the 1970s as an actress in pornographic films. She has also been involved in political campaigns, particularly in advocating for use of a single currency in the EU.

== Early life and education ==
Bourdon was born in 1949 in Cologne, Germany. Sometime in her life, she earned a degree in economic science.

== Career ==
=== Pornographic film industry ===
During the 1970s, Bourdon appeared in several pornographic films. Among them include Candice Candy (1976), Rêves pornos (1975), Sylvia dans l'extase (1976), and Africa Love (1976).

In 1978, she opened an erotic art gallery which featured artists including French visual artist, Jean-Jacques Lebel.

=== Politics ===
Bourdon started advocating for a single-use currency across the European Union starting from 1985. She was also given a mandate by then vice-president of the European Investment Bank (EIB), Panagiotis Gennimatas, to help economically develop Greece.

== Filmography ==
Year	Title	Distributor
French Blue	1974	Alpha Blue Archives
A bout de sexe	1975	France-Continental
Candy's Candy	1975	Variety Films
Dans la chaleur de Julie	1975	VCX
Draguse: Les perversions lubriques	1975	Impex Films
House of Love	1975	France-Continental
Porn's Girls	1975	Europrodis
Pornocrates	1975	Contrechamp
Prostitution clandestine	1975	Unknown
Pussy Talk	1975	Alpha Blue Archives
Randy Widow	1975	Productions du Chesne
Eva et l'amour	1976	Avia Films
Exces	1976	Avia Films
Games for an Unfaithful Wife	1976	Alpha France
Hurlements de plaisir	1976	Unknown
P comme penetration	1976	France-Continental
Big Fuck	1977	Alpha France
Nicole par-dessus par-dessous	1978	Productions du Chesne
