= Jean-Pierre Bouyxou =

French film critic and actor (1946–2025)

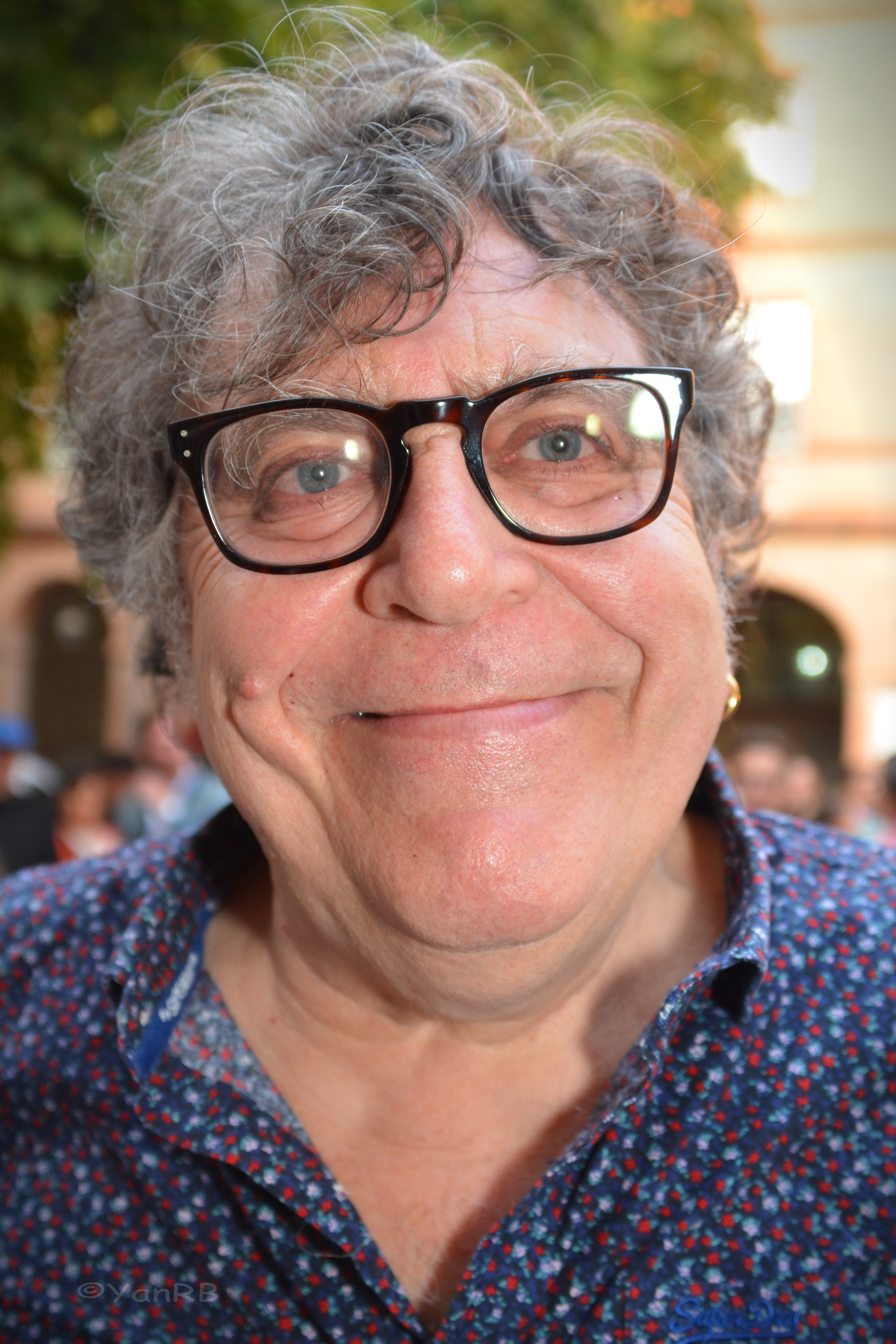
- Bouyxou in 2017
- Born: 16 January 1946; Bordeaux, Gironde, France
- Died: 2 September 2025 (aged 79)
- Other names: J.P Buixou; Jerôme Fandor; Georges Le Gloupier; Annie Schon
- Occupations: Actor; writer; director; editor
- Years active: 1964–2025

Jean-Pierre Bouyxou (16 January 1946 – 2 September 2025) was a French film critic, author, filmmaker and actor.

== Life and career ==
Bouyxou started his career as a writer in 1964 when his article was published in fanzines (Mercury, Lunatique). Some other magazines he wrote for were Vampirella, Sex Stars System, Zoom (1969–1976), Métal hurlant, L'Écho des savanes, Penthouse, Lui, Hara-Kiri, Paris Match.

He was editor-in-chief of Fascination for thirty issues, from 1978 to 1986.

Bouyxou participated in the happenings of Jean-Jacques Lebel.

He worked with Roland Lethem, Étienne O'Leary, Jesus Franco, Jean Rollin and Alain Payet.

Bouyxou died on 2 September 2025, at the age of 79.
