= List of twin performers on stage and screen =

This is a list of twins who appeared together in entertainment acts or performing arts.

== Shared roles ==
Primarily among identical twins, and particularly with child actors (so as not to work them at the same level as adults), producers have sometimes taken the opportunity to divide up a single role between two performers.

Names	Year of birth	Nationality	Genre	Role	Source
Andrew and Steven Cavarno	1992	United States	Television drama	Owen Salinger in Party of Five	
Lindsay and Sidney Greenbush	1970	United States	Television drama	Jill Hayden in Sunshine, Carrie Ingalls in Little House on the Prairie	
Frankie and George McLaren	1997	England	Film	Marcus in Hereafter	
Diane and Erin Murphy	1964	United States	Television sitcom	Tabitha Stephens in Bewitched (As fraternal twins, both Diane and Erin played the role in the show's third season, but as their looks diverged, subsequent seasons featured Erin only. Diane filled in once during the fifth season when Erin was ill, and also made guest appearances in other roles.)	
Rachel and Amanda Pace	2000	United States	Television and film	Abby Carlton in The Young and the Restless, Hope Logan in The Bold and the Beautiful, Madeline Barton in Elevator (see below for performances where they appeared in separate roles)	
Kyle and Ryan Pepi	1993	United States	Television and film	Kirkland Harrison in Another World, Jackie Dunphy in Outside Providence, Billy Underwood in The X-Files (Episode: "Invocation")	
Anniston and Tinsley Price	2012	United States	Television and film	Holly Wheeler in Stranger Things, Young Tiffany in Galveston	
Jason and Kristopher Simmons	2002	United States	Television drama	Wyatt Halliwell in Charmed	
Dylan and Cole Sprouse	1992	United States	Television and film	Patrick Kelly in Grace Under Fire, Julian McGrath in Big Daddy, Sammy Jr. in Diary of a Sex Addict, Buddy in The Nightmare Room (Episode: "Scareful What You Wish For"), Young Pistachio in The Master of Disguise, Jack Pyne in Apple Jack, Older Jeremiah in The Heart Is Deceitful Above All Things (see below for performances where they appeared in separate roles)	
Brenda and Wendi Turnbaugh	1977	United States	Television drama	Grace Ingalls in Little House on the Prairie	
Aaron and Adam Weis	1981	United States	Film	Bradley Bradshaw in Top Gun	

== Shared performances ==
Names	Identical?	Year of birth	Nationality	Genre	Appearances	Source
Kaya and Sarp Akkaya		1980	Turkey	Acting	Muhteşem Yüzyıl	
John and Tony Alberti		1986	United Kingdom	Reality television	Love Island	
Nadiya and Natalie Anderson		1986	United States	Reality television	The Amazing Race, Survivor: San Juan del Sur	
Aaron and Shawn Ashmore		1979	Canada	Acting	Blackout (TV film), Fringe (Episode: "Amber 31422")	
Electra and Elise Avellan	Yes	1986	Venezuela	Acting	Grindhouse, The Black Waters of Echo's Pond, Machete, Machete Kills	
Amanda and Michelle Babin	Yes	1988	United States	Reality television	America's Next Top Model	
Conrad and Bonar Bain	Yes	1923	Canada	Acting	Maude (Episode: "Vivian's Surprise"), Diff'rent Strokes (Episode: "The Van Drummonds")	
Karina and Raechelle Banno	Yes	1993	Australia	Acting	Pandora (Episode: "Chimes of Freedom"), Better Man, short films Second Best and Phenomena	
Pili and Mili (Pilar and Emilia Bayona)	Yes	1947	Spain	Musical comedy	Como dos gotas de agua, Dos chicas locas, locas, Whisky and Vodka, Sharp-Shooting Twin Sisters, Scandal in the Family, Un novio para dos hermanas, Dos gemelas estupendas, Agáchate, que disparan, Princesa y vagabunda, La guerra de las monjas	
Anna and Mats Bergman	No	1948	Sweden	Acting	Fanny and Alexander	
Gayle and Gillian Blakeney	Yes	1966	Australia	Soap opera, pop music	TV: Wombat, Neighbours, Silk Stalkings (Episode: "Pas de Deux")	
Gayle and Gillian Blakeney	Yes	1966	Australia	Soap opera, pop music	Singles: "All Mixed Up", "Mad If Ya Don't!", "Wanna Be Your Lover"	
Isabella and Sofia Bliss	No	1998	Australia	Reality television	Junior MasterChef Australia	
Igor and Grichka Bogdanoff	Yes	1949	France	Television hosts	Temps X, Rayons X	
Marilyn and Rosalyn Borden		1932	United States	Acting	Nightclub and television variety shows, I Love Lucy (Episode: "Tennessee Bound"), CHiPs (Episode: "Green Thumb Burglar"), Maude (Episode: "Musical '78"), The Ropers (Episode: "Your Money or Your Life"), Lottery! (Episode: "San Diego: Bingo!"), Out of This World (Episode: "Evie's Double Trouble")	
Les Twins, Larry and Laurent Bourgeois		1988	France	Dance, acting	Dance: Cirque du Soleil's Michael Jackson: The Immortal World Tour; music videos and tours with Beyoncé, Jason Derulo	
Les Twins, Larry and Laurent Bourgeois		1988	France	Dance, acting	Film: Men in Black: International, Cats	
Nicholas Brendon and Kelly Donovan		1971	United States	Acting	Coherence	
The Brewster Twins, Barbara and Gloria		1918	United States	Acting	Ditto, Life Begins in College, Wake Up and Live, Love and Hisses, Wife, Doctor and Nurse, Happy Landing, Hold That Co-ed, Little Miss Broadway, My Lucky Star, Thanks for Everything, The Flame of New Orleans	
Clare and Julie Buckfield	Yes	1976	England	Teen drama	Grange Hill	
Thomas and Stephen Buell		1992	United States	Reality television	The Challenge: Battle of the Bloodlines	
Claire and Shawn Buitendorp		1990	United States	Reality television	Project Runway, Twinning	
The Fabulous Wonder Twins (Carlos and Louis Campos)		1967	El Salvador	Drag performers	Nightclubs and music videos, including Gloria Estefan's "Everlasting Love"	
Alex and Charlotte Caniggia	No	1993	Argentina	Reality television	Mujeres ricas, Bailando por un Sueño, Caniggia libre, Resistiré, Cantando, El hotel de los famosos	
Charlie and Max Carver	Yes	1988	United States	Acting	TV: Desperate Housewives, Teen Wolf, The Leftovers	
Charlie and Max Carver	Yes	1988	United States	Acting	Film: Fist Fight, A Midsummer Night's Dream, In the Cloud, The Batman	
Catherine and Marie-Pierre Castel		1949	France	Acting	The Nude Vampire, Lips of Blood, Rene the Cane, various erotic films directed by Jean Rollin and others	
Shannon and Shannade Clermont		1994	United States	Reality television	Bad Girls Club	
Nicola and Teena Collins	Yes	1978	England	Acting	Snatch, Caffeine	
Madeleine and Mary Collinson	Yes	1952	Malta	Acting	Come Back Peter, Permissive, Groupie Girl, She'll Follow You Anywhere, The Love Machine, Twins of Evil	
Cooper and Luca Coyle, as Sugar (Solay) and Spice		1998	United States	Drag performers	TikTok, RuPaul's Drag Race	
Dennis and Phillip Crosby		1934	United States	Singing	Part of The Crosby Brothers (with brother Lindsay Crosby) - Nightclub and television variety shows, released 1 album and several singles	
Brittany and Cynthia Daniel		1976	United States	Acting	TV: Sweet Valley High, The New Leave It to Beaver (Episode: "Man's Greatest Achievements"), Burke's Law (Episode: "Who Killed the Legal Eagle?"), That '80s Show (Episode: "Sophia's Depressed")	
Brittany and Cynthia Daniel		1976	United States	Acting	Film: The Basketball Diaries, Cheaper by the Dozen	
Angela and Maureen Deiseach		1972	Canada	Teen drama	Degrassi	
The Dolan Twins, Ethan and Grayson		1999	United States	Comedy	Vine, YouTube, Total Request Live	
The Dolly Sisters, Jenny and Rosie	Yes	1892	Hungary	Vaudeville, revue	Ziegfeld Follies	
Winston and Weston Doty		1914	United States	Acting	One Terrible Day, Peter Pan	
Madeline and Marion Fairbanks		1900	United States	Silent film, revue, musical theatre	Film: 37 motion pictures, often as "The Thanhouser Twins"	
Madeline and Marion Fairbanks		1900	United States	Silent film, revue, musical theatre	Stage: Ziegfeld Follies, Two Little Girls in Blue, Oh, Kay!	
Emily and Haley Ferguson		1992	United States	Reality television	The Bachelor, Bachelor in Paradise	
Paul and Peter Frame		1957	United States	Ballet	New York City Ballet	
Melanie and Martina Grant		1971	United Kingdom	Television presenters, singing	Cheerleaders on Fun House, released 1 album as "A Twin Thing" in Japan	
Sabrina and Morgane Gromer		1993	France	Reality television	Secret Story	
Isa and Jutta Günther		1938	Germany	Acting	11 films, including Two Times Lotte, Vier Mädels aus der Wachau (together with the Kessler Twins), and The Twins from Zillertal	
The Hager Twins, Jim and Jon		1941	United States	Country music, comedy	Discography: 6 albums	
The Hager Twins, Jim and Jon		1941	United States	Country music, comedy	TV: Hee Haw, The Bionic Woman, Twin Detectives, Country Kitchen	
Deidre and Andrea Hall	Yes	1947	United States	Soap opera	Days of Our Lives	
The Aswirl Twins, Ron and Richard Harris		1953	United States	Reality television	America's Next Top Model	
Abby and Brittany Hensel		1990	United States	Reality television	Abby & Brittany	
Elza and Nellie Jenkins	Yes	1992	New Zealand	Reality television	New Zealand's Next Top Model	
Allie and Lexi Kaplan		1993	United States	Reality television	Ex on the Beach (US)	
Ingrid and Monique Kavelaars		1971	Canada	Acting	National Lampoon's Senior Trip, Jeremiah (Episode: "Moon in Gemini")	
Leigh and Leslie Keno		1957	United States	Television hosts	Antiques Roadshow, Find!, Buried Treasure	
The Kessler Twins, Alice and Ellen		1936	Germany	Dance, acting, singing	Variety shows, Eurovision Song Contest 1959, about 20 films (often in dance roles), various albums and singles (some as a duo, others as a trio partnered with Peter Kraus)	
Brent and Shane Kinsman		1997	United States	Acting	Cheaper by the Dozen, Cheaper by the Dozen 2, Desperate Housewives, ER (Episode: "The Book of Abby")	
Diane and Elaine Klimaszewski		1971	United States	Acting	Film: Problem Child 2, Tiger Heart, Spy Hard, Looking for Lola, Scary Movie 3, Drop Dead Sexy, Date Movie, Bachelor Party Vegas	
Diane and Elaine Klimaszewski		1971	United States	Acting	TV: Weird Science (Episode: "Bikini Camp Slasher"), The Last Frontier (Episode: "Babes in Joyland"), Pauly (Episode: "Pauly Come Home"), Star Trek: Enterprise (Episode: "Broken Bow", part 1), Nikki (Episode: "Family Lies"), The Drew Carey Show (Episode: "A Means to an End"); also appeared in Coors Light "Love Songs" ad campaign and were dubbed the "Coors Light Twins"	
The Lane twins, Gary and Larry	Yes	1975	United States	Acting	Eating Out: All You Can Eat, Jack and Jill, Acting Dead	
Pauline Lapointe and Louise Portal		1950	Canada	Acting	Emma	
Mirtha and Silvia Legrand		1927	Argentina	Acting	Educating Niní, Bajo un mismo rostro	
Peyton and Spencer List	No	1998	United States	Acting	Bereavement, The Thinning: New World Order	
Jason and Jeremy London	Yes	1972	United States	Acting	7th Heaven (Episode: "Smoking"), Hunt Club, Neglected	
Kenny and Keith Lucas	Yes	1985	United States	Comedy	Film: 22 Jump Street, Babes	
Kenny and Keith Lucas	Yes	1985	United States	Comedy	TV: Lucas Bros. Moving Co., Friends of the People, The Grinder, Lady Dynamite	
Laurent and Pierre Malet		1955	France	Acting	Boomerang	
Samanda (Amanda and Samantha Marchant)	Yes	1988	United Kingdom	Reality television	Big Brother (UK)	
Billy and Bobby Mauch	Yes	1921	United States	Acting	The Prince and the Pauper, Penrod and Sam, Penrod and His Twin Brother, Penrod's Double Trouble	
Dario and Raphy Medrano		1992	United States	Reality television	The Challenge: Battle of the Bloodlines	
The Merrell Twins, Veronica and Vanessa	Yes	1996	United States	Social media, comedy	YouTube, Jane the Virgin, Faking It (Episode: "Prom Scare"), Like a Boss, Mean Girls	
Adria Montgomery-Klein and Natalie Montgomery-Carroll		1974	United States	Reality television	Big Brother (US)	
Camilla and Carey More	Yes	1957	England	Acting	Lottery! (Episode: "Honolulu: 3 − 2 = 1"), Calendar Girl Murders, Friday the 13th: The Final Chapter, The Twin, Days of Our Lives	
Tia and Tamera Mowry		1978	United States	Acting, R&B vocalists	Featured roles (TV): Sister, Sister, Detention, Seventeen Again, Twitches, Twitches Too, Tia & Tamera	
Tia and Tamera Mowry		1978	United States	Acting, R&B vocalists	Guest appearances: Rosie (Episode: "Adventures in Blondiesitting"), True Colors (Episode: "In a Flash"), Full House (Episode: "The Devil Made Me Do It"), Are You Afraid of the Dark? (Episode: "The Tale of the Chameleons"), Smart Guy (Episode: "Brother, Brother"), Strong Medicine (Episode: "My Sister, My Doctor, Myself")	
Tia and Tamera Mowry		1978	United States	Acting, R&B vocalists	Film: The Hot Chick; Music: Part of girl group Voices before their acting careers got underway	
Skyler and Spencer Nick		1992	United States	Reality television	Worst Cooks in America, Twinning	
Mary-Kate and Ashley Olsen	No	1986	United States	Acting	Featured roles (TV): Full House, To Grandmother's House We Go, Double, Double, Toil and Trouble, How the West Was Fun, Two of a Kind, Switching Goals, So Little Time	
Mary-Kate and Ashley Olsen	No	1986	United States	Acting	Guest appearances: Hangin' with Mr. Cooper (Episode: "Hangin' with Michelle"), Sister, Sister (Episode: "Slime Party"), All My Children, 7th Heaven (Episode: "Gossip"), The Simpsons (Episode: "Diatribe of a Mad Housewife")	
Mary-Kate and Ashley Olsen	No	1986	United States	Acting	Film: The Little Rascals, It Takes Two, New York Minute, plus 8 direct-to-video films and 2 series released by their company Dualstar	
Rachel and Amanda Pace	Yes	2000	United States	Acting	Weeds, Private Practice (Episodes: "In Which Addison Finds the Magic" and "Shotgun"), Ringer (Episode: "It's Gonna Kill Me, But I'll Do It"), Kirstie (Episode: "Maddie's Agent"), Switched for Christmas (see above for performances where they alternated in a single role)	
James and Oliver Phelps	Yes	1986	England	Acting	Harry Potter film series, Kingdom (Series 3, Episode 5)	
Cassie and Connie Powney		1983	England	Acting	Hollyoaks, What a Girl Wants, Dalziel and Pascoe (2 episodes)	
Kathryn and Megan Prescott		1991	England	Acting	Doctors (Episode: "Dare, Double Dare, Truth"), Skins	
Giovanni and Marissa Ribisi	No	1974	United States	Acting	My Two Dads (Episode: "She'll Get Over It"), Some Girl, According to Spencer, On the Verge (Episodes: "The Big Sneeze" and "The Cat That Shat")	
Dominic and Felix Roco		1989	Philippines	Acting	Otso-Otso: Pamela-Mela Wan, Super Inggo, Fantastikids, Super Twins, Zorro, What Isn't There	
Camilla and Rebecca Rosso	Yes	1994	England	Teen comedy, singing	The Suite Life of Zack & Cody, Legally Blondes, The Suite Life on Deck (Episode: "Model Behavior"); sang as The Rosso Sisters with two siblings	
Jean and Liz Sagal	Yes	1961	United States	Acting	Double Trouble, Grease 2, Picket Fences (Episodes: "Nuclear Meltdowns" and "The Body Politic")	
Keith and Kevin Schultz	Yes	1953	United States	Acting	The Monroes, Brothers (Episode: "Two-Timin' Man")	
Drew and Jonathan Scott	Yes	1978	Canada	Reality television	Property Brothers	
Kristina and Karissa Shannon		1989	United States	Reality television	The Girls Next Door, Celebrity Big Brother, Botched (TV series), Rob & Chyna; acting cameo in Somewhere	
Darcey and Stacey Silva		1974	United States	Reality television	Darcey & Stacey	
The Sklar Brothers, Randy and Jason	Yes	1972	United States	Comedy	Cheap Seats, Partners, Mighty Med, Those Who Can't	
Dylan and Cole Sprouse		1992	United States	Acting	Featured roles (TV): The Suite Life of Zack & Cody, The Suite Life On Deck, The Suite Life Movie (see above for performances where they alternated in a single role)	
Dylan and Cole Sprouse		1992	United States	Acting	Guest appearances: That '70s Show (Episode: "Eric's Depression"), The Emperor's New School (Episode: "Oops, All Doodles/Chipmunky Business"), That's So Raven (Episode: "Checkin' Out"), According to Jim (Episode: "I Drink Your Milkshake"), Wizards of Waverly Place (Episode: "Cast-Away (To Another Show)"), Hannah Montana (Episode: "Super(stitious) Girl") I'm in the Band (Episode: "Weasels on Deck"), So Random! (Episode: "Cole and Dylan Sprouse")	
Dylan and Cole Sprouse		1992	United States	Acting	Film: Eight Crazy Nights (voice acting roles), Just for Kicks (direct-to-video), voice actors in several other direct-to-video films	
Dan and Don Stanton		1952	United States	Acting	Film: Good Morning, Vietnam, Gremlins 2: The New Batch, Terminator 2: Judgment Day, Mom and Dad Save the World, Looney Tunes: Back in Action, Kill Your Darlings	
Dan and Don Stanton		1952	United States	Acting	TV: Eerie, Indiana (Episodes: "Forever Ware", "Zombies in P.J.s", and "The Broken Record"), Just My Imagination, Lois & Clark: The New Adventures of Superman (Episode: "A Bolt From the Blue"), The Suite Life of Zack & Cody (Episode: "Twins at the Tipton")	
Zarko and Zeljko Stojanovic		1987	Serbia	Reality television	Secret Story	
Karissa and Katie Strain		1990	Canada	Acting	Todd and the Book of Pure Evil (Episode: "Terrible Twin Turf Tussle"), Murdoch Mysteries (Episodes: "Blood and Circuses" and "Rhapsody in Blood"), Carrie, Odd Squad (Episode: "The Jackies/Invasion of the Body Switchers"), Rogue (Episode: "Dirty Laundry"), Wynonna Earp (Episode: "Landslide"), Twinsanity, Slip (Episode: "The Dakini")	
Manpei and Shinpei Takagi		1985	Japan	Drama, live-action manga	Juken Sentai Gekiranger (Episode: "Biba-Biba! Another Retsu"), Mei-chan no Shitsuji, Lessons for a Perfect Detective Story (episode 9), Ouran High School Host Club	
Renee and Rosie Tenison	Yes	1968	United States	Television sitcom	Married... with Children (Episodes: "Lookin' for a Desk in All the Wrong Places" and "Torch Song Duet"), CB4, Martin (TV series) (Episode: "Housekeeper from Hell"), The Jamie Foxx Show (Episode: "Who's Da Man?"), Malcolm & Eddie (Episode: "Lockdown"), The Steve Harvey Show (Episode: "Party of Five"), The Parkers (Episode: "She's a Bad Mamma Jamma")	
Elliott and Luke Tittensor	Yes	1989	England	Acting	Brookside	
David and Nicholle Tom	No	1978	United States	Acting	Criminal Minds (Episode: "Damaged")	
Jools and Lynda Topp		1958	New Zealand	Country music, comedy	Topp Twins discography: 5 albums	
Jools and Lynda Topp		1958	New Zealand	Country music, comedy	TV/film: Do Not Adjust Your Twinset, The Topp Twins: Untouchable Girls	
Harry and Luke Treadaway		1984	England	Acting	Brothers of the Head	
Blake and Dylan Tuomy-Wilhoit		1990	United States	Television sitcom	Full House, Fuller House	
Keaton and Kylie Tyndall	Yes	1992	United States	Acting	City of Angels, Animal Jam, Joan of Arcadia (Episode: "Silence"), The Way Station, The Bold and the Beautiful, Insatiable (Episode: "Pilot"), Big Love (Episodes: "The Happiest Girl", "Take Me as I Am", and "Oh, Pioneers"), And They're Off	
Danielle and Gabrielle Victor		1988	United States	Reality television	Bad Girls Club	
Andrew and Elliot Weber		1983	United States	Reality television	The Amazing Race	
Lee and Lyn Wilde		1922	United States	Singing, acting	Filmography (singing): Juke Box Jenny, Reveille with Beverly, Presenting Lily Mars, Two Girls and a Sailor, Till the Clouds Roll By	
Lee and Lyn Wilde		1922	United States	Singing, acting	Filmography (acting): Andy Hardy's Blonde Trouble, Twice Blessed, Campus Honeymoon, Look for the Silver Lining	

== Other twin performers ==
Fraternal twin sisters from Italy (born 1932), Anna Maria and Maria Luisa Pierangeli, had substantial acting careers and each won a Golden Globe, but never appeared on screen together. Anna Maria was discovered first and given the stage name Pier Angeli for her MGM contract. Her success led to Maria Luisa receiving a contract from Paramount and adopting the name Marisa Pavan. The closest they came to a shared performance was that each starred in a separate episode of the Westinghouse Desilu Playhouse series: Pier Angeli in Season 1's "Song of Bernadette", the first regular episode after the show's kickoff, and Marisa Pavan in Season 2's "Come Back to Sorrento". Additionally of note is that Sodom and Gomorrah, in which Pier Angeli starred, also featured the Kessler Twins as dancers.

Similarly, identical twins Lauren and Lorraine Vélez (born 1964) have each appeared in episodes of Law & Order and Elementary, but not together.

== Families on screen with twins ==
In addition to those competing and performing in reality television shows as included in the table, two prominent shows featuring large families included twins. Jon & Kate Plus 8 had the Gosselin twins (Cara and Mady) along with their younger sextuplet siblings. The Duggar family of 19 Kids and Counting included two sets of twins, Jana and John-David (fraternal) and Jedidiah and Jeremiah (identical).

Two other shows centered on families with dwarfism also happened to involve twins. Our Little Family featured the Hamill family with parents, an older son, and twins CeCe and Cate. The Roloff family in Little People, Big World included twin brothers Jeremy and Zach.

== See also ==
- Lisa and Lottie
- The Parent Trap (film series)
- Twinning (TV series)
- List of twins
- List of twin teammates in sports
