= Killing Car =

- DVD cover (Region 1)
- Directed by: Jean Rollin
- Produced by: Jacques Michel
- Starring: Tiki Tsang; Bertrand Biget; Jack Mitchel
- Cinematography: Max Monteillet
- Edited by: Janette Kronegger
- Music by: Philippe Brejean
- Production company: Tanagra Productions
- Distributed by: Impex Films
- Release date: 1993
- Running time: 87 minutes
- Country: France
- Languages: French; English
- Budget: $100,000 (in USD)

Killing Car (original title: Femme dangereuse, lit. Dangerous Woman, also known as The Blood Red Car) is a 1993 French surreal revenge thriller film directed by Jean Rollin. Starring Tiki Tsang, it centres on a mysterious woman who assassinates a number of people, while a pair of detectives follow her trail. The film pays homage to Rollin's earlier works, such as, Le frisson des vampires, Les raisins de la mort, and Fascination.

== Plot ==
A mysterious, young Asian woman enters a scrapyard where the salesman offers her payment-in-kind in exchange for a car; the woman appears to be in favour of his service, but suddenly draws a gun and shoots him dead. The woman proceeds to steal a '58 Edsel Corsair, only to be disturbed by the salesman's girlfriend, who begins to shoot back. Following a brief shoot-out between the women, the girlfriend approaches a group of prostitutes. The woman gives chase, gunning down the prostitutes, while the girlfriend escapes, but is eventually located and killed. A little toy car is discovered amongst the body as a calling card as two detectives investigate the case. One the which, the senior detective, almost due for retirement, seems to be dismissive of the situation, while the young detective is convinced there is more to it than meets the eye.

The mysterious woman tracks a couple, Robert and Sylvie, to a country farmhouse, killing Sylvie, and severely wounding Robert. Before he dies he realises that he and the woman were connected to an incident that occurred one year prior. A man named Marc and his girlfriend, Monique, arrive at the farmhouse to meet with Robert to do an illegal deal over a stolen Goddess of Fertility statue, only to find the woman waiting for them and claiming to be an acquaintance of Robert's. Marc agrees to do the deal with her, but Monique is suspicious of her intentions. Monique goes to the barn and screams when she finds Robert and Sylvie's bodies. Marc runs to her aid and is shot dead, while Monique tries to defend herself, to no avail, the woman impales her through the chest with a pitchfork.

A photographer named Pascale returns from New York to Paris and meets with the woman to engage in a modelling photo shoot. Pascale becomes unsettled by the woman's haunting appearance. Following a nude shoot, they are interrupted by Pascale's friend, Barbara, who suggests they do a shoot for fun with the woman as an executioner, while Barbara plays the victim. The woman goes into a trance and proceeds to cut Barbara's throat when Pascale is forced to slap her. This invokes a memory for the woman and she stabs Pascale. Barbara attempts to lead her to safety, but the pair are shot and killed. The detectives retrieve the negatives from Pascale's camera and by this point, with the stolen Edsel and the toy cars planted among the bodies, the woman has been dubbed "Car Woman".

The Car Woman's next victim is a young office worker who recognises the car parked in the street; she instantly recalls an incident that happened one year earlier and is shot and wounded by the Car Woman but manages to survive. She then auditions for the job of a night club dancer as a means of luring the owner, Sam Spade, to his death along with his current performer. Lastly, she lures two antique dealers to a back alley where she discusses a trade with the Goddess of Fertility statue, planning to ambush them, only for one of them to recognise the vehicle and question her, where she reveals that one year ago she and her lover were involved in a car accident in the same Edsel, leaving her lover blind and disfigured. The Car Woman somehow managed to acquire information on the identities of those who drove by and failed to help and swore vengeance. Following the murders of the antique dealers, it becomes evident that someone has been assisting her along the way, in which she instructs this person to meet her in a designated spot to receive payment.

The Car Woman, having made a promise to her lover by exacting revenge on those who wronged them, kisses him goodbye and puts him out of his misery by shooting him. She goes to a deserted wasteland where her assistant is revealed to be the senior police detective and pays him for his services. As she walks away, the young detective, having discovered the truth, confronts the senior detective, who attempts to bribe him before drawing his gun, but is killed first by the young detective. In her despair, the Car Woman wanders off as her mission has come to an end.

== Cast ==
- Tiki Tsang as "Car Woman"
- Bertrand Biget as Senior Police Detective
- Jack Mitchel as Police Detective
- Frédérique Haymann as Car Saleswoman
- Jean-Jacques Lefeuvre as Car Salesman
- Karine Swenson as Sylvie
- Jean-René Gossard as Robert
- Karine Hulewicz as Monique
- Pascal Montsegur as Marc
- Barbara Annovozi as Barbara
- Pascale Lemaire as Pascale
- Omu Dierryla as Club Dancer
- Samuel Tastet as Sam Spade
- Morgan Buquen as Office Girl (Christian's girlfriend)
- Jean-Pierre Bouyxou as Christian
- Anissa Berkani–Rohmer as Helpful Woman
- Maurice Rohmer as Helpful Man
- Fabienne Beze as Lisa (female antique dealer)
- Jean-Loup Philippe as Male Antique Dealer
- Meline Genot as Police Informer
- Jean Rollin as Bandaged Man (credited as Michel Gentil)
- Véronique Djaouti as Véro (uncredited)

== Production ==
In 1991, Jean Rollin's career as a filmmaker began to rapidly decline. He had planned to produce his most latest feature, Charming Detectives, which was partially filmed, and the proposed television series Dracula's Return, which was submitted for commission for France 3 in 1992 but was not picked up. Both projects were ultimately abandoned.

Rollin eventually accepted a deal from Michel Gué, who financed Killing Car (working title Femme dangereuse) in 1989, but the project was temporarily shelved and remained in the pre-production process for three years. The film was produced in ten days beginning in November 1992, with additional scenes filmed within five days in January 1993. Filmed in Paris, the Parisian Suburbs and Viglain in Sologne, the production process proved to be difficult as a Siberian cold fell that winter. The role of the "Car Woman" was specifically written for Australian model Tiki Tsang, and it remains her only film credit. Jean-Loup Philippe, having appeared in several of Rollin's works, was cast in the role as an antique dealer. Many of the female roles were filled by models, in particular, Frédérique Haymann and Véronique Djaouti, had both appeared in Charming Detectives. Djaouti was a close friend of Rollin's and worked as an assistant director on Killing Car, as well as working with him on several of his other productions.

it was shot on a minimal budget ($100,000 in USD) and on 16 mm film. All usable print or negative is apparently lost and therefore the film cannot be remastered a proper high-definition restoration. Following the shoot, Rolling had taken seriously ill and post-production was postponed for several months.

== Home media ==
The film had initial difficulty in finding distribution. While unable to release it theatrically, Rollin made a failed attempt to sell it to the television market, before it was eventually made available for a direct-to-video release. Due to its moderate success, particularly among Rollin fans, the film was released to international audiences several years later, including its first-ever DVD release and television broadcast in the UK in October 2006 on Zone Horror, which was the final Jean Rollin film to premiere on the network, having previously aired The Rape of the Vampire, The Nude Vampire, Requiem for a Vampire, The Iron Rose, The Demoniacs, The Grapes of Death, Fascination, The Living Dead Girl and The Two Orphan Vampires.

Killing Car was released in France on VHS on 1 January 1996 and on DVD as part of the Jean Rollin collection from LCJ Editions on 15 November 2004.

In the United Kingdom, the film was released via Redemption Films on 23 January 2006. Special features for this release contain a stills gallery, video art and a partial Jean Rollin filmography. It misleadingly lists an exclusive interview between Jean Rollin and noted horror specialist and academic Dr. Patricia McCormack, Redemption Films preview trailers and a bonus feature of the music video to the song "Spell" by the band Cadaveria, though the release does not contain any of these three features, which were available on previous Redemption releases. The film contains its original French language version of the film as well as optional English subtitles.

The US DVD of the film by Redemption Films on 29 April 2008 included an interview with Rollin.

As of 2024, the film is being planned for Blu-ray release in the UK from Powerhouse Films, under their Indicator subsidiary label, as are several other of Rollin's titles, which are being released in both 4K and standard Blu-ray formats. It has not yet been announced when the film will be made available, or whether it will be available in 4K or standard Blu-ray format.
