= Paul Bisciglia =

French actor (1928–2010)

- Born: Paul Antoine Alphonse Bisciglia; 30 July 1928; Algiers, Algeria
- Died: 18 April 2010 (aged 81); Nanterre, France
- Occupation: Actor
- Years active: 1950–1999

Paul Antoine Alphonse Bisciglia (30 July 1928 – 18 April 2010) was a French film actor.

== Career ==
Throughout his acting career, Bisciglia appeared in more than one hundred feature films. He made his debut in the 1950 film Trois télégrammes. What followed was several uncredited roles, before landing a much larger part in drama Clara de Montargis. During the fifties, he appeared in many drama films, including the award-winning Avant le déluge, with Antoine Balpêtré, and again several more uncredited roles. During the sixties, Bisciglia began to appear more frequently in television series and television films, although he was included in many films such as The Wretches, with Michèle Morgan, Les vieux de la vieille, with Pierre Fresnay, Paris nous appartient, Le signe du lion, and in 1966, he appeared in his first leading role in Alain Cuniot's L'or et le plomb.

In 1969, Bisciglia had a small role in the horror film La vampire nue, the second feature film from director Jean Rollin. It was Bisciglia's first of several times working with Rollin. He worked with the director again in the successful films Requiem pour un vampire, with Marie-Pierre Castel and Mireille D'Argent, Les démoniaques, Lèvres de sang, and the zombie classic Les raisins de la mort, with Marie-Georges Pascal.

His career continued through the seventies and eighties, such as the Golden Globe-nominated Les aventures de Rabbi Jacob, Club privé pour couples avertis, with Philippe Gasté of Jean Rollin's Requiem pour un vampire, Verdict, with Sophia Loren, L'aile ou la cuisse, Family Rock, and he voiced in three animated films Astérix et la surprise de César (Asterix vs. Caesar), Astérix chez les Bretons (Asterix in Britain) and Astérix et le coup du menhir (Asterix and the Big Fight). Bisciglia's acting career continued until 1999, during which he appeared in two final feature films, Profil bas and Montana Blues.

Bisciglia also had a successful television career appearing in a number of television series and films. He made his first appearance in the 1957 television film L'équipage au complet. His television films include Elle s'abaisse pour vaincre, Les fiancés de Loches, Claudine à Paris and the television film remeke Les liaisons dangereuses. His television series credits include Le théâtre de la jeunesse, Rocambole, Les saintes chéries, Schulmeister, espion de l'empereur, Les brigades du Tigre, De mémoire d'homme, Les cinq dernières minutes, Désiré Lafarge, Commissaire Moulin, Les enquêtes du commissaire Maigret and Julien Fontanes, magistrat.

== Selected filmography ==
- Three Telegrams (1950) - Jeune facteur
- Beware of Blondes (1950) - (uncredited)
- Under the Paris Sky (1951) - (uncredited)
- The Beautiful Image (1951) - (uncredited)
- Clara de Montargis (1951)
- Le désir et l'amour (1951)
- La grande vie (1951)
- Le Dindon (1951) - Victor - le groom
- Before the Deluge (1954) - Jean-Jacques Noblet
- Quay of Blondes (1954) - Le chasseur de l'hôtel
- Papa, Mama, the Maid and I (1954) - Un locataire du sixième étage (uncredited)
- Men in White (1955) - Un interne
- M'sieur la Caille (1955) - Loupe
- Forgive Us Our Trespasses (1956)
- Short Head (1956) - Un chasseur de l'hôtel (uncredited)
- Les lumières du soir (1956) - Un copain de Catherine au restaurant
- The Hunchback of Notre Dame (1956) - Un homme à la fête des fous (uncredited)
- The River of Three Junks (1957) - Le chauffeur de taxi / Driver (uncredited)
- The Seventh Commandment (1957) - Le chasseur
- Funny Face (1957) - Photographer (uncredited)
- Comme un cheveu sur la soupe (1957) - Le livreur de fleurs (uncredited)
- Le souffle du désir (1958)
- La liberté surveillée (1958) - Riri
- La p... sentimentale (1958) - Le chauffeur
- Les Cousins (1959) - Marc
- Twelve Hours By the Clock (1959)
- Checkerboard (1959) - (uncredited)
- Witness in the City (1959) - Un chauffeur de taxi
- Bal de nuit (1959)
- Lovers on a Tightrope (1960) - Le mécano
- Les scélérats (1960)
- Les mordus (1960) - Le peintre
- The Old Guard (1960) - Jojo, le fiancé de Mariette
- Les filles sèment le vent (1961)
- La Belle Américaine (1961) - Un coursier (uncredited)
- All the Gold in the World (1961) - Un photographe
- Paris Belongs to Us (1961) - Paul
- The Sign of Leo (1962) - Willy
- Arsène Lupin Versus Arsène Lupin (1962) - Un croque-mort (uncredited)
- The Bamboo Stroke (1963)
- Méfiez-vous, mesdames (1963) - Le barman
- Cherchez l'idole (1964) - L'assistant du tailleur (uncredited)
- The Troops of St. Tropez (1964) - Le conseiller du prince (uncredited)
- La grosse caisse (1965) - Un machiniste (uncredited)
- Pas de caviar pour tante Olga (1965)
- Le caïd de Champignol (1966)
- L'or et le plomb (1966)
- Is Paris Burning? (1966) - Un homme sur un char (uncredited)
- The Sunday of Life (1967) - Le vendeur de journaux (uncredited)
- Action Man (1967) - Le barman (uncredited)
- Hibernatus (1969) - Le prêtre moderne (uncredited)
- La vampire nue (1970) - Butler
- Children of Mata Hari (1970)
- The Little Theatre of Jean Renoir (1970, TV Movie) - Un clochard (segment "Le dernier réveillon")
- Dougal and the Blue Cat (1970) - Le Chat Bleu (voice)
- Comptes à rebours (1971)
- Le cinéma de papa (1971) - L'acteur refusé à l'audition
- Bof... Anatomie d'un livreur (1971) - Le contremaître
- Requiem pour un vampire (1971) - L'homme au vélo
- Le Viager (1972) - Un maquisard (uncredited)
- Fusil chargé (1972)
- L'oeuf (1972) - Un employé de Dufiquet
- Les galets d'Étretat (1972)
- Murder Is a Murder (1972) - L'employé de Kastner
- Les voraces (1973)
- Elle court, elle court la banlieue (1973) - M. Max
- Don Juan, or If Don Juan Were a Woman (1973)
- There's No Smoke Without Fire (1973)
- Le désir et la volupté (1973)
- L'affaire Crazy Capo (1973) - Le barman
- The Mad Adventures of Rabbi Jacob (1973) - Le pompiste
- La dernière bourrée à Paris (1973)
- Mais où est donc passée la septième compagnie ? (1973) - Le père
- Housewives on the Job (1973)
- Club privé pour couples avertis (1974) - Le livreur (uncredited)
- Bloody Murder (1974) - Le médecin légiste
- On s'est trompé d'histoire d'amour (1974) - Un chauffeur de taxi
- Comment réussir quand on est con et pleurnichard (1974) - Le chasseur PLM
- Grandeur nature (1974) - Le douanier (uncredited)
- Comme un pot de fraises (1974)
- Verdict (1974) - Un juré
- La kermesse érotique (1974) - Cremier
- The Slap (1974) - Le serveur
- Young Casanova (1974) - Le flic dubitatif
- Les démoniaques (1974) - Paul - un naugrageur
- La soupe froide (1975) - Le garde-champêtre
- L'important c'est d'aimer (1975) - L'assistant-metteur en scène
- Lévres de sang (1975) - Le psychiatre
- On a retrouvé la 7ème compagnie ! (1975) - Claumachet
- Indécences (1975) - L'homme des bois
- Lumière (1976) - La Bougie
- Perversions (1976) - Le couple au square
- Suce-moi vampire (1976) - Le médecin
- The Wing or the Thigh (1976) - Le bagagiste
- Soumissions perverses (1977) - Jules Larrigau
- Délectations (1977) - Orgon
- Exhibitions danoises (1977) - Le patron du théâtre
- Vicieuses et insatisfaites (1977)
- Brigade call-girls (1977) - Henri
- Animal (1977) - Le gardien
- Marche pas sur mes lacets (1977)
- Les raisins de la mort (1978) - Lucas
- Les ringards (1978)
- Cause toujours... tu m'intéresses! (1979) - L'agent de police
- Ta gueule, je t'aime! (1980) - Le metteur en scène
- Trop au lit pour être honnête (1980) - La garçon
- Anthracite (1980) - Le concierge
- Les contes de La Fontaine (1980) - Messire Jean
- Les deux mains (1980) - L'émir
- Julien Fontanes, magistrat (1980-1986, TV Series) - Albert Piot / L'interviewer / Le technicien TV
- Belles, blondes et bronzées (1981)
- Salut... j'arrive! (1982)
- Lucie sur Seine (1982) - Le commissaire #1
- Family Rock (1982)
- La baraka (1982) - Le client
- C'est facile et ça peut rapporter... 20 ans (1983)
- Les planqués du régiment (1983)
- Asterix Versus Caesar (1985) - (voice)
- La dernière image (1986)
- Love Without Pity (1989) - L'homme de l'Huma
- Asterix and the Big Fight (1989) - Agecanonix (voice)
- Profil bas (1993) - Le patron du bistrot
- Montana Blues (1995) - Le chauffeur de taxi
