= Ayana Ife =

American Muslim fashion designer

Ayana Ife is an American Muslim fashion designer most known for her appearance on the television show Project Runway, where Ife was named runner-up of season 16 and the first designer of modest clothing to make it that far. Before her appearance on the show, Ife attended Middle Tennessee State University where she studied Textile Merchandising and Design.

== Background ==
Ife was born in Brooklyn, New York and raised in a small town in upstate New York alongside 10 siblings. Her family comes from Trinidad and Tobago.

Her passion for fashion design has existed since she was a child. She learned to sew when she was 6 years old and sold her first original piece at the age of 10. She would practice her skills on scraps from her mother, who was a seamstress, and hand-me-down items she inherited from her sisters.

After graduating in 2015, Ife moved to Salt Lake City, Utah for a fresh start. She spent her time in Utah improving her business skills, joining an entrepreneur group, and applying for Project Runway multiple times. Two years later and her fourth time applying, she was chosen to compete on Project Runway and debuted her modest clothing collection at the New York Fashion Week.

After finishing Project Runway, Ife earned her master's degree in Brand and Business Management at Politecnico di Milano in Milan, Italy. She briefly worked for designer Zac Posen in New York City as an intern. In 2021, Ife co-hosted the annual Textile Merchandising and Design Fashion Show at her alma mater, where she also taught fashion promotion.

Since its 2024 debut, Ayana has been selling pieces from her modest activewear line called Ayana Active. She also currently holds bridal consultations in Danville, Pennsylvania.

== Modest clothing and significance ==
Definitions of modest clothing can vary, and Ife's presence on television demonstrated the diversity of modest style to its viewers. Ife's modesty is defined by full-length garments that do not show skin, which she says may be either too modest or not modest enough for others.

Ife's purpose for creating modest clothing is to fill a gap she noticed in the Western-style clothing market, which lacked modest clothing that was also adventurous and trendy. When she originally applied for Project Runway, Ife's goal was to become an international designer, but upon receiving praise from fans who felt she was representing Muslim women in the United States, she has remained a role model for American Muslims.
