= Tiki Tsang =

Australian former actress and model (born 1968)

- Born: 19 June 1968 (age 57); Brisbane, Queensland, Australia
- Education: St. Bridgadines College (class of 1984)
- Occupation: Model • Actress
- Years active: 1989 (actress)
- Notable work: Killing Car (1989)

Tiki Tsang (born 19 June 1968) is an Australian former actress and model. She is best known for her role in the 1989 French revenge thriller Killing Car, directed by Jean Rollin.

== Early life ==
Tsang was born in Brisbane, Queensland, Australia in 1968. She graduated from St. Bridgadines College in 1984. She was raised Roman Catholic.

== Career ==
Following high school, Tsang relocated to France to pursue a career in modeling. In 1989, she was cast in the leading role in the revenge thriller Killing Car, directed by Jean Rollin, in which she played a strange woman who steals an American car and proceeds to track down and kill a number of people, for no apparent reason. Rollin said that the part of "The Car Woman" was written for her. Although this is the only film credit to her name, Tsang is known to Rollin fans for collaborating with the director. The film, which was filmed in about one week during early 1989, did not receive an initial release until 1993. Following the role, Tsang continued to model in various locations in the world.

== Personal life ==
In early 2012, Tsang returned to Australia.
