= Requiem for a Vampire =

- Theatrical release poster
- Directed by: Jean Rollin
- Produced by: Sam Selsky
- Starring: Marie-Pierre Castel; Mireille Dargent; Philippe Gasté; Dominique; Louise Dhour
- Music by: Pierre Raph
- Distributed by: Les Films ABC
- Release date: 1972
- Running time: 87 minutes
- Country: France
- Language: French

Requiem for a Vampire (French: Requiem pour un Vampire, also known as Caged Virgins) is a 1972 French erotic horror/fantasy film directed by Jean Rollin, about two young women who find themselves trapped in a haunted castle ruled by vampires.

== Plot ==
Two women dressed as clowns and a male driver are being chased through the countryside, for unknown reasons. As the man drives, the women shoot at their pursuers. When the man is shot, the women are forced to burn the car with his body inside and once they remove their costumes, they run through a forest, and later a cemetery, in which one of the women, Michelle, is almost buried alive.

Walking through a field, they come to the outside of a gothic castle. There they are bitten by vampire bats, which lead them to go into the castle, where they have sex in a cozy bed. They tour the castle and discover a few skeletons along with a woman playing an organ. She begins to follow them, so they shoot at her, but she doesn't die. They run away and are caught by some men who force themselves on them. A vampire woman stops the men, and the vampire woman who chased them almost bites them until they break away. They soon come across a male vampire, the last of his kind. He has plans for the women. They are bitten in order to continue his bloodline, but they must stay virgins. Michelle likes the idea of everlasting life but her girlfriend has serious doubts, and by having sex with Frédéric, a random passerby, she not only jeopardizes the vampire's plans but also puts the mutual love and friendship between her and Michelle to the ultimate test. The vampire realizes that he must not continue the bloodline, and lets Michelle and her girlfriend escape.

== Production ==
=== Casting ===
Marie-Pierre Castel, who starred in Rollin's previous films La Vampire Nue and Le Frisson des Vampires, joined the cast of Requiem because her twin sister Catherine Castel was unavailable. An agent had introduced Rollin to Mireille Dargent, who would play Marie's partner in the film. This agent was a crook, and collected Dargent's wages for his own benefit. Rollin hired a lawyer and the agent paid the earnings back to her. Requiem was Louise Dhour's first film. She used to sing Damia's songs at Paris nightclub La Ville Grille. As the vampires' maidservant in the film, she was given the most important of her roles and thus became part of the Films ABC family.

=== Location ===
The movie was filmed in the small village of Crêvecoeur. The graveyard was located outside the village on a knoll. The castle, a historical place entirely furnished with genuine antiques, all of which were worth a fortune, had been rented from the duchess of Roche-Guyon. It wasn't her castle that Rollin and the crew were interested in, but the ruins of the dungeon above, that overlooked the entire area.

=== Censorship ===
The infamous whipping scene from Requiem pour un Vampire

Due to the nudity, some of the scenes had to be shot twice for such countries as the UK. For the scene where Dargent is whipping the naked Castel, another scene was shot with her wearing a bra and panties. For the two other scenes, where Castel and Dargent have sex, two scenes were shot: the original with them completely naked, and the other fully clothed. In the original scene where Dargent is being chased by the man, she was topless; in the censored scene, she was clothed.

== Cast ==
- Marie-Pierre Castel as Marie
- Mireille Dargent as Michelle
- Philippe Gasté as Frédéric
- Dominique as Erica
- Louise Dhour as Louise
- Michel Dalesalle as Le vieux vampire
- Antoine Mosin as Le premier barbare
- Olivier François as Le deuxième barbare
- Dominique Toussaint as Le troisième barbare
- Agnès Petit as Le troisième victime des vampires
- Agnes Jacquet as Le premier victime des vampires
- Anne-Rose Kurra as Le deuxième victime des vampires
- Paul Bisciglia as L'homme au vélo

== Home media ==
The film was released on VHS in France as part of the Collectorror collection. The North American VHS edition, retitled Caged Virgins, were released on August 22, 1995. A UK VHS edition was released by Salvation.

Several versions of the film were released on DVD in different countries. For the North American DVD release, issued on 30 March 1999, the film was retitled Requiem for a Vampire. The film was released in France as part of the Jean Rollin Collection on 24 June 2004, with extras including an interview with Rollin, a biography and a filmography. The UK DVD was released on 9 September 2004 by Redemption Films, in a full-frame version. The North American DVD editions were re-released on 24 February 2009, with extras including alternative scenes, a 10-minute interview with Dhour, trailers, additional scenes and a photo gallery.

A three-disc DVD limited edition was released by Encore in Europe in a new 1.78:1 anamorphic widescreen version, with extras including audio commentary and introduction by Rollin, original trailers, a slideshow, alternative scenes, interviews with Bisciglia and Dhour, and a 64-page booklet.
