= Willy Braque =

French actor (1933–2022)

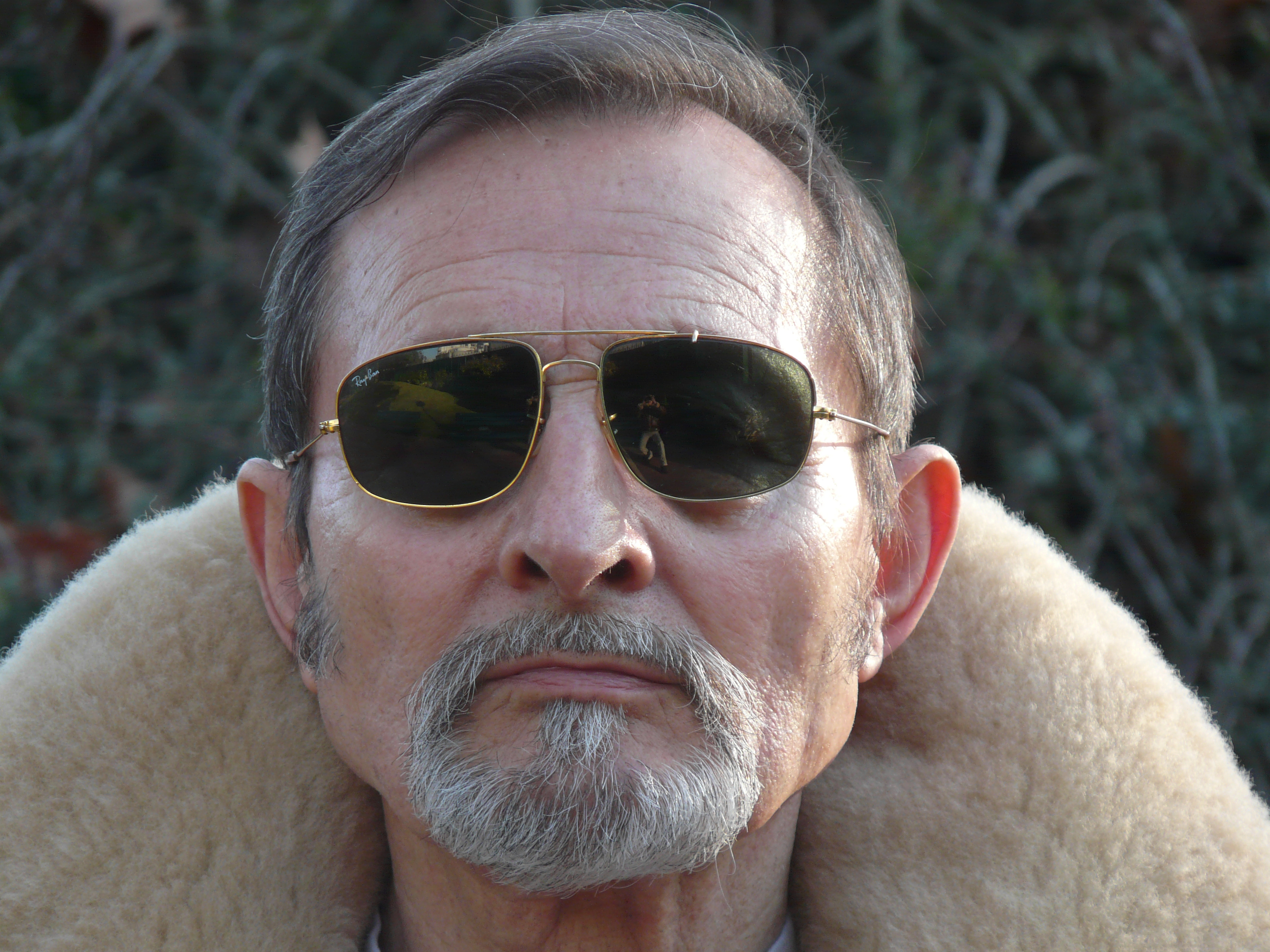
- Born: Guy Francisque Peyraud; 28 June 1933; Roanne, France
- Died: 26 May 2022 (aged 88); Clichy, Hauts-de-Seine, France
- Occupations: Actor, director, producer, writer
- Years active: 1952–1989

Willy Braque (born Guy Francisque Peyraud, 28 June 1933 – 26 May 2022) was a French actor, director, producer and writer. He was perhaps best known for his roles in Jean Rollin classics Les démoniaques (The Demoniaques) and Lèvres de sang (Lips of Blood) Braque also appeared in Rollin's more erotic films, such as Jeunes Filles Impudiques (Shameless Young Schoolgirls) and Tout le Monde il en a Deux. He worked with directors including Jess Franco, José Bénazéraf, Robert Hossein, Jean-Pierre Mocky and Lasse Braun.

== Filmography ==
Film
Year	Title	English	Role	Notes
1952	Le chemin de Damas	The Road to Damas	(Unknown role)	Uncredited
1962	Les culottes rouges	Red Panties	Un prisonnier à l'office religieux	Uncredited
1963	Un drôle de paroissien	Heaven Sent	Albert, le domestique	Uncredited
1963	Le concerto de la peur	The Concerto of Fear	Martin, un complice de Sacha	
1963	Des frissons partout	Jeff Gordon, Secret Agent	Émile - un homme de Lorenz	
1964	La mort d'un tueur	The Death of a Killer	(Unknown role)	
1964	Laissez tirer les tireurs	Let the Shooters Shoot	Petit rôle	Uncredited
1964	Coplan prend des risques	Coplan Takes Risks	(Unknown role)	Uncredited
1964	Aimez-vous les femmes?	Do You Like Women?	Un sbire de Larsen	
1964	Lucky Jo		Raymond Garcia	
1964	Le gorilles	The Gorillas	(Unknown role)	Uncredited
1965	L'enfer dans la peau	Hell in the Skin	François/Frankie	
1966	La longue marche	The Long Walk	Robert	
1966	Massacre pour une orgie	Massacre of pleasure	Willy	
1966	Little Girls		Projector man	
1967	Salut les copines	Hello Friends	(Unknown role)	
1967	Amnésie 25	Amnesia 25	L'homme	Short
1968	Flash Love		(Unknown role)	
1969	Chute libre	Free Fall	(Unknown role)	Short
1970	Bartleby		L'infirmier	Short
1971	La secte du diable	The Devil's Sect	(Unknown role)	Short
1972	La guerre des espions	The War of Spies	(Unknown role)	
1973	Jeunes filles impudiques	Schoolgirl Hitchhikers	Fred	
1974	Les démoniaques	The Demoniacs	Le Bosco	
1975	Lèvres de sang	Lips of Blood	Le tueur de l'aquarium	
1975	Le jouisseur	The Enjoyer	Gangster	
1975	Les chatouilleuses	The Ticklish Ones	Gómez	
1975	La planque 2	The Hide Out 2	(Unknown role)	
1976	Les emmerdeuses	The Annoying Ones	Kashfi	

Adult film
Year	Title	English	Role	Notes
1973	Close-up		(Unknown role)	Short
1974	La kermesse érotique	The Erotic Fair	Le 'fou du premier'	
1976	Suce-moi vampire	Suck Me Vampire	Le tueur de l'aquarium	(Note: Pornographic version of Lévres de Sang, with hardcore scenes added to the film in 1976.)
1976	Made in Sex		Willy	
1976	Amours collectives	Collective Loves	Willy	
1976	Projections spéciales	Special Screenings	Serge - le réalisateur	
1977	Positions danoises	Danish Positions	Willy	
1977	Jeux de langues	Language Games	L'homme	
1977	Entrecuisses	Crotch	Hubert	
1977	Un dîner très spécial	A Very Special Dinner	(Unknown role)	
1978	Ouvre-toi	Open Yourself	(Unknown role)	
1980	Amours d'adolescentes pubères	Love of Pubescent Teenagers	(Unknown role)	

Television
Year	Title	English	Role	Notes
1964	L'abonné de la ligne U	The U Line Subscriber	(Unknown role)	(Unknown episodes)
1985	Néo Polar		Trésor	Season 1, episode 7

Non-acting work
Year	Title	English	Notes
1965	Mission spéciale à Caracas	Mission to Caracas	Car stunts
1967	Amnésie 25	Amnesia 25	Short film; director, writer & producer
1969	Chute libre	Free Fall	Short film; director & writer
1971	La secte du diable	The Devil's Sect	Feature film; director and writer
