= La Longue marche =

- Directed by: Alexandre Astruc
- Screenplay by: Alexandre Astruc; Jacques-Laurent Bost; Jean-Charles Tacchella
- Produced by: Georges Casati
- Cinematography: Jean-Jacques Rochut
- Edited by: Claudine Bouché
- Music by: Antoine Duhamel
- Production company: Transatlantic Productions
- Release date: 1966
- Running time: 90 minutes
- Country: France
- Language: French

La Longue marche is a 1966 French drama film directed by Alexandre Astruc, starring Robert Hossein, Jean-Louis Trintignant and Maurice Ronet. The narrative is set in 1944 within the French Resistance. Principal photography took place from 29 September to 13 November 1965. The film had 532,532 admissions in French cinemas.

== Cast ==
- Robert Hossein as Carnot
- Jean-Louis Trintignant as Philippe
- Maurice Ronet as Chevallier
- Jean-Pierre Kalfon as Piton
- Berthe Grandval as the pharmacist's daughter
- Robert Dalban as the pharmacist
- Willy Braque as Robert
- Paul Frankeur as Morel
