= Roadrunners (The X-Files) =

- The X-Files episode
- The parasitic creature, believed by a cult to be the Second Coming of Jesus Christ. The creature was created through the use of animatronics.
- Episode no.: Season 8 Episode 4
- Directed by: Rod Hardy
- Written by: Vince Gilligan
- Production code: 8ABX05
- Original air date: November 26, 2000
- Running time: 44 minutes

Guest appearances
- Bryan Dilbeck as Disabled Man; David Barry Gray as Hank Gulatarski; Todd Jeffries as Agent Brian Mayfield; Conor O'Farrell as Sheriff Ciolino; William O'Leary as Gas Station Man; Lawrence Pressman as Mr. Milsap; Rusty Schwimmer as Female Bus Driver

Episode chronology
← Previous "Patience"	Next → "Invocation"
- The X-Files season 8

"Roadrunners" is the fourth episode of the eighth season and the 165th episode overall of the science fiction television series The X-Files. "Roadrunners" is a "Monster-of-the-Week" story, unconnected to the series' wider mythology. The episode first aired in the United States on November 26, 2000, on Fox and on March 1, 2001, on Sky1 in the United Kingdom and Ireland. It was written by Vince Gilligan and directed by Rod Hardy. The episode earned a Nielsen household rating of 8.3 and was watched by 13.6 million viewers. The episode received mixed reviews from television critics.

The series centers on FBI special agents Dana Scully (Gillian Anderson) and her new partner John Doggett (Robert Patrick)—following the alien abduction of her former partner, Fox Mulder (David Duchovny)—who work on cases linked to the paranormal, called X-Files. In this episode, Scully, working alone, pursues a cult that worships a slug-like organism that it believes it to be the Second Coming of Jesus Christ. But in her efforts to save an injured stranger, she discovers she is in over her head.

The episode was written by Gilligan to be intentionally "creepy". Furthermore, Gilligan wanted to show the audience that John Doggett was a good person and an ally of Scully's. The parasitic creature that was used in the episode was designed to look like a banana slug and was created via animatronics. Several of the scenes were so gruesome that producer Paul Rabwin later noted that some of the cameramen "start[ed] to lose it" during filming.

== Plot ==
In the desert near Sugarville, Utah, a hitchhiker catches a ride from a passing bus, which soon stops without explanation. The hitchhiker watches a man with crutches leave the bus, joined by the other passengers. Following them, he sees them stone the man to death. They later surround the hitchhiker as he tries in vain to escape.

FBI special agent Dana Scully (Gillian Anderson) goes to investigate the murder. The victim, a twenty-two-year-old backpacker, now shows signs of body decay usually associated with old age. Later, at a pay phone, she asks her partner, John Doggett (Robert Patrick), to check the X-Files for cases mentioning glycoproteins. While discussing the case with Doggett, the bus passes her, and she follows it to a gas station in the middle of the desert. A man with an injured hand learns that she is a medical doctor and fills her car with gasoline laced with water. After her car stalls, Scully returns to the gas station and is told that rain got into the gas canister.

The attendant tells Scully that Mr. Milsap is the only person with a working phone, but she discovers that the line is dead. Mr. Milsap offers Scully a room at the local boarding house, but Scully tries the rest of the town only to be ignored by everyone; they are all too engrossed in Bible-study groups. Disturbed by the turn of events, she keeps her gun close at hand. The next morning, Mr. Milsap tells Scully that there is a man who needs help downstairs. She goes with him and finds the hitchhiker from the episode's opening scene having a seizure. She advises them to take him to the hospital, but they claim that they do not have any cars. While examining the man, Scully discovers a strange, circular wound on his back. Meanwhile, Doggett calls the sheriff at Scully's original destination and learns that Scully has not yet arrived and he sets out to find her.

The sick man begins to recover, and Scully talks to him while the townspeople are gone. He does not seem to know who he is or how he arrived. She inspects his wound again and finds a lump moving along the man's spine; digging into the open wound, she pulls out a piece of a large worm. Scully talks with the hitchhiker, Hank, about the creature and believes she cannot get it out without killing him. Scully goes to find a car but, moments after leaving, Hank immediately tells the townspeople what she is up to and that "another swap" is needed. Concurrently, Doggett arrives in Utah and informs the Sheriff about a series of X-Files involving similar back wounds and death by stoning.

Scully is eventually captured by the townspeople and the worm is inserted into her body. She is tied to a bed and told by the people what an honor this is. When Doggett arrives she tries to alert him but is gagged before she can do so. Eventually, Doggett finds Scully, cuts the worm out of her, and shoots the creature dead. Later, Scully is packing her things in the hospital when Doggett comes in to inform her about the trial of the cult members; they are offering little defense except that they claim that they are being persecuted for their religious beliefs. Scully muses that they thought the worm was the Second Coming of Jesus Christ. She apologizes to Doggett for going out on the mission alone and promises never to do so again.

== Production ==
=== Writing ===
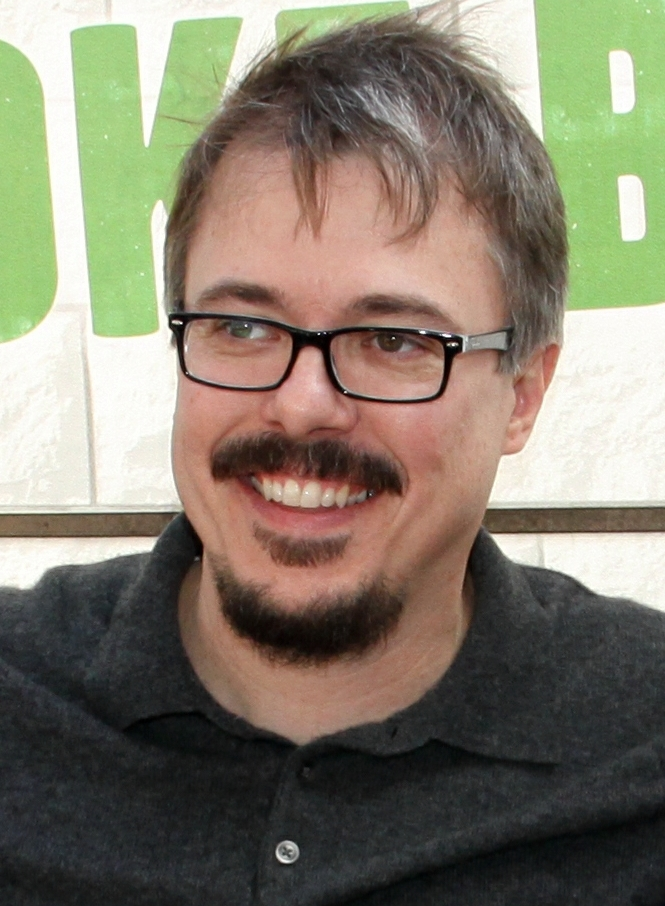
"Roadrunners," written by Vince Gilligan, was described as "uncharacteristically brutal."

"Roadrunners" was written by Vince Gilligan and was inspired by the thriller film Bad Day at Black Rock (1955). The script, called "uncharacteristically brutal" for Gilligan—who had been noted for his comedic episodes like season five's "Bad Blood" and "X-Cops"—was written with the expressed intent to make, according to Gilligan, "a really all-out scary, creepy, get under-your-skin—literally and figuratively—X-File." Gilligan also wanted the episode to show the audience that John Doggett was on the side of the heroes. The writer explained, "I wanted this gangbusters episode, one that showed Doggett was a good guy; someone to be counted on."

Many fans were unhappy with Doggett's condescension towards Scully during her apology. Robert Patrick, the actor who portrayed Doggett, however, had a different interpretation: "The whole essence of the scene was, 'Look, I'm here for you. I've got your back. We're partners now.' And you give that the weight of a Marine saying to someone, 'I'll jump on a grenade for you, so you can trust me.' The idea was to really assure the fans that the show was continuing on."

Several of the characters in the episode were named after real-life individuals, including: the character of Hank, who was named after the brother of Vince Gilligan's girlfriend; Mr. Milsap, whose name is a reference to the American country music singer and pianist Ronnie Milsap; and Sheriff Ciolino who was named after Gilligan's mortgage broker.

=== Directing ===
The episode was directed by Rod Hardy, making it his first credit for the series. Hardy was offered the role after an unknown individual working at The X-Files saw his TBS remake of the film High Noon. The parasitic creature that was used in the episode was created using animatronics and was designed to look like a banana slug. During the scene where the creature is inserted into Scully's back, the production crew created a false fiberglass back for Gillian Anderson. To create the illusion that the creature was crawling up the body, the fiberglass was placed on top of Anderson, and then the animatronic slug was pressed against the fake back. Anderson later described the scene as "fun to shoot", although she also called it "exhausting" because she had to struggle on the bed, all the while tied down, with her arms being attached to the headboard and her legs to the footboard. Paul Rabwin later noted that he had several cameramen "start to lose it" during the scene.

== Reception ==
=== Ratings ===
"Roadrunners" first aired in the United States on Fox on November 26, 2000. The episode earned a Nielsen household rating of 8.3, meaning that it was seen by 8.3% of the nation's estimated households. The episode was seen by 13.6 million viewers. The episode ranked as the 38th most-watched episode for the week ending November 26. In the United Kingdom and Ireland, the episode made its first appearance on television on March 1, 2001, on Sky1. "Roadrunners" was the seventh most watched program that week and received 0.67 million viewers.

=== Reviews ===
"Roadrunners" received mixed reviews from critics. Den of Geek writer Juliette Harrisson named the episode the "finest stand-alone episode" of the show's eighth season. Harrisson praised the character development in "Roadrunners" and noted that the episode "effectively brings [Scully and Doggett] together as partners." Robert Shearman, in his book Wanting to Believe: A Critical Guide to The X-Files, Millennium & The Lone Gunmen, rated the episode four stars out of five. The author note that, "for the first half-hour, this works as a slow burn horror story ... It's the transition of Gillian Anderson's performance from wry exasperation to outright paranoia ... which makes this so effective." However, Shearman did criticize the cutting of John Doggett's role to a minimum. Emily St. James of The A.V. Club awarded the episode an "A−" and wrote that it "is an episode that’s dedicated to helping us move past the Mulder era." She praised the creepiness of Gilligan's script, as well as the characterization of Scully, writing that even though she is in a situation that is over her head, she is still smart in her attempts to escape; she also praised Anderson's acting. However, St. James was more critical of the final scene, noting that it made Doggett come across as "kind of an asshole". Paul Spragg of Xposé wrote positively of the episode, saying it features a "return to the body horror stories that had worked so well in the early seasons". Spragg added that "Roadrunners" is "certainly close" to the highly acclaimed first-season episode "Ice".

Not all reviews were positive. George Avalos and Michael Liedtke of the Knight Ridder Tribune wrote that the episode's slug "continued the series' fine tradition of monsters that made us queasy as we squirmed in our seats". Despite enjoying the gore and the reality of Scully's isolation, the two were critical of the cult's motivations, writing that "we were given absolutely no clue as to why the Utah cult members believed the slug represented the Second Coming of Jesus Christ." The two ultimately concluded that "Roadrunners" fell "well short of a classic." Paula Vitaris from Cinefantastique gave the episode a scathing review and awarded it no stars out of four. She heavily derided the plot, sarcastically referring to Doggett as a "man's man" and the parasite a "phallic-shaped giant slug". Furthermore, she criticized Scully's actions to go off on an assignment without telling her partner. Dave Golder from SFX criticized the episode and called it a retread of the first season episode "Ice".

== Work cited ==
- Hardy, Rod (2005), ""Vienen": Commentary", The X-Files Mythology, Volume 4 – Super Soldiers (DVD), 20th Century Fox Home Entertainment
- Hurwitz, Matt; Knowles, Chris (2008). The Complete X-Files. Insight Editions. ISBN 978-1-933784-80-9.
- Shearman, Robert (2009). Wanting to Believe: A Critical Guide to The X-Files, Millennium & The Lone Gunmen. Mad Norwegian Press. ISBN 978-0-9759446-9-1.

This article incorporates material derived from the "Roadrunners" article on the X-Files wiki at Fandom (formerly Wikia) and is licensed under the Creative Commons Attribution-Share Alike 3.0 License (March 7, 2012).
