= Twinning (TV series) =

American reality show

- Genre: Reality television
- Presented by: Angie Greenup
- Country of origin: United States
- Original language: English
- No. of seasons: 1
- No. of episodes: 11

Production
- Executive producers: Susan Levison; Jill Holmes; Kristen Kelly; Fernando Mills; Tricia Biggio
- Producers: Howard Schultz; Rob LaPlante; Jeff Spangler
- Running time: 60 minutes (including commercials)
- Production company: Lighthearted Entertainment

Original release
- Network: VH1
- Release: July 22 – September 30, 2015

Twinning is a VH1 reality show that premiered on July 22, 2015. The series featured twelve sets of identical twins, testing their "twin-tuition" in mental and physical challenges.

== Format ==
During the competition, all contestants were housed in two adjacent houses, one green, one blue. One of each pair of twins lived in the green house, while the other lived in the blue house, keeping everyone separated from their twin.

Each week, there was a "Double-Down Challenge", a game that tested physical or mental abilities. The nature of the challenges varied each week, but mostly required coordination between pairs of twins without direct communication. After each challenge, the highest-scoring twin pairs won the right to move freely between the two houses for a limited time, allowing them visit their twins. The winning twins were also allowed to vote for two pairs of twins to enter the "Twin-Off".

At the end of each week, two pairs of twins were pitted against each other in a "Twin-Off". During the Twin-Off, contestants were asked questions about personal opinions or preferences without being allowed to communicate. If a pair of twins gave the same answer, they score a point, and the first pair to score five points wins the Twin-Off and are allowed to remain in the competition, while the losers of the Twin-Off were eliminated.

== Contestants ==
Twins	Placement
Shawn & Claire Buitendorp	Winners
Torian & Tre Fields	Runners-up
Kristina & Kamila Podvisotskaya	3rd
Ji & Le Otun	4th
Skyler & Spencer Nick	5th
GinaMarie & AnnaMarie Russo	6th
Bennett & Winston Butterfield	7th
Adam & Cory Zinker	8th
Dylan & Taylor Cash	9th
Roxanne & Nicole Frilot	10th
Chris & Josh Martinez	11th
MeMe & Key Vickers	12th

== Game progress ==
Teams	Episodes										
Teams	1	2	3	4/5	6	7	8	9	10	11	
Shawn & Claire	WIN	WIN	SAFE	WIN	WIN	BTM	WIN	BTM	BTM	WIN	WINNERS
Torian & Tre	SAFE	WIN	SAFE	WIN	WIN	BTM	WIN	SAFE	WIN	BTM	RUNNERS-UP
Kristina & Kamila	SAFE	SAFE	WIN	BTM	SAFE	WIN	SAFE	WIN	SAFE	ELIM	
Ji & Le	SAFE	SAFE	SAFE	WIN	SAFE	WIN	BTM	WIN	ELIM		
Skyler & Spencer	BTM	WIN	SAFE	SAFE	BTM	SAFE	SAFE	ELIM			
GinaMarie & AnnaMarie	WIN	BTM	BTM	SAFE	SAFE	SAFE	ELIM				
Bennett & Winston	SAFE	SAFE	WIN	SAFE	WIN	ILL					
Adam & Cory	SAFE	SAFE	WIN	SAFE	ELIM						
Dylan & Taylor	WIN	WIN	WIN	ELIM							
Roxanne & Nicole	SAFE	SAFE	ELIM								
Chris & Josh	WIN	ELIM									
Meme & Key	ELIM										

=== Notes ===
WINNER: The set of twins won the final Twin-Off and Twinning.
RUNNERS-UP: The set of twins lost the final Twin-Off and was the Runner-Up team.
WIN: The set of twins won the challenge.
BTM: The set of twins was voted into the Twin-Off and won.
ELIM: The set of twins was eliminated at the Twin-Off.
ILL: The set of twins was removed from the competition due to illness.

In episode 4, Torian & Tre pulled a prank on the houseguests by switching houses when they weren't one of the winning teams. Therefore, host Angie said that they were forced to switch houses.

Episode 4 ended in with a fight between Kristina and Ji & Le. In episode 5, Host Angie asked all the twins to gather in one house, and asked them if anyone wanted Ji & Le or Kristina & Kamila to be sent home. They all agreed that both teams should stay in the house. The game went on with the Twin-Off between Kristina & Kamila and Dylan & Taylor.

In Episode 5, Bennett was sent to the ER after the producers thought he needed medical attention after a severe headache and fever. Therefore, Winston voted by himself.

In Episode 7, the twin-off was cancelled after Bennett was deemed too sick to continue in the competition. As a result, Winston was forced to leave the house and therefore the team was medically unable to continue.

In Episode 11, Shawn & Claire won the final challenge, sending Torian & Tre and Kristina & Kamila into the semi-final Twin-Off. After Torian & Tre defeated Kristina & Kamila, they faced Shawn & Claire in the final Twin-Off.

== Episodes ==
No.	Title	Original release date	US viewers (millions)
1	"Twinvasion"	July 22, 2015	0.39
2	"Twinstinct"	July 29, 2015	0.47
3	"Twinstigate"	August 5, 2015	0.40
4	"Twinsanity"	August 12, 2015	0.52
5	"Twintastrophy"	August 19, 2015	0.60
6	"Twinpulation"	August 26, 2015	0.55
7	"Twinfection"	September 2, 2015	0.41
8	"Twinjob"	September 9, 2015	0.54
9	"Twinwreck"	September 16, 2015	0.57
10	"Twinception"	September 23, 2015	0.40
11	"Twinners"	September 30, 2015	0.46

== Other appearances ==
- Shawn & Claire competed on Project Runway (season 16) in 2017, Shawn finished in 10th place and Claire finished in 9th place after being disqualified for cheating.
- Skylar & Spencer competed on the sixteenth season of Worst Cooks in America in 2018, Skylar finished in 12th place and Spencer finished in 9th place.
