= Redrum (The X-Files) =

- The X-Files episode
- Episode no.: Season 8 Episode 6
- Directed by: Peter Markle
- Story by: Steven Maeda; Daniel Arkin
- Teleplay by: Steven Maeda
- Production code: 8ABX03
- Original air date: December 10, 2000
- Running time: 44 minutes

Guest appearances
- Derick Alexander as Bailiff; Brien Blakely as Reporter; Lee Duncan as Al Cawdry; Kayla Henry as Haley Wells; Roger Hewlett as Tall Guard; James Howell as Homicide Detective; Anne-Marie Johnson as Vicky Wells; J. Patrick McCormack as Brent Tufeld; Cynthia Martells as District Attorney Carter; Joe Morton as Martin Wells; Luis Rodgriguez as Gangbanger; Joanna Sanchez as Trina Galvez; Jack Shearer as Benjamin Kinberg; Shane Sinutko as Lead Officer; Guy Torry as Shorty; Danny Trejo as Cesar Ocampo; Bellamy Young as Janet Wilson

Episode chronology
← Previous "Invocation"	Next → "Via Negativa"
- The X-Files season 8

"Redrum" is the sixth episode of the eighth season of the American science fiction television series The X-Files. It premiered on the Fox network on December 10, 2000. The story for the episode was developed by Steven Maeda and Daniel Arkin, the teleplay was written by Maeda, and the episode was directed by Peter Markle. "Redrum" is a "Monster-of-the-Week" story, unconnected to the series' wider mythology. The episode received a Nielsen rating of 8.1 and was viewed by 13.2 million households. Overall, the episode received moderately positive reviews from critics.

The series centers on FBI special agents Dana Scully (Gillian Anderson) and her new partner John Doggett (Robert Patrick)—following the alien abduction of her former partner, Fox Mulder (David Duchovny)—who work on cases linked to the paranormal, called X-Files. In this episode, a lawyer friend of Doggett's named Martin Wells tries to clear his name of the crime after his wife is murdered. Unfortunately for him, his perception of time regresses backwards, day by day. This leads to confusion, but ultimately an answer as to who killed Wells' wife.

"Redrum", described as a "Twilight Zone-type thriller" by critics, heavily featured the actor Joe Morton, who had previously played a role in the 1991 sci-fi film Terminator 2: Judgment Day alongside series co-star Robert Patrick. The title of the episode was purposely picked by episode writer Steven Maeda to be "murder" spelled backwards, a reference to Stephen King's The Shining. The episode's main character, Martin Wells, was named after famed 19th century author H. G. Wells.

== Plot ==
Martin Wells, a renowned Baltimore prosecutor, wakes in a prison cell with a stitched wound on his cheek. His longtime friend, FBI Agent John Doggett (Robert Patrick), and Dana Scully (Gillian Anderson) meet him for a transfer. Outside, a man that Wells recognizes shoots him. As Wells dies, he watches the hands of Scully's watch stop and begin turning backwards. Wells then awakens again, but with no bullet wounds. Doggett tells him he is accused of murdering his wife, Vicky, and initially believes Wells is feigning confusion to build an insanity defense. In court, Wells recognizes his father-in-law, Al Cawdry, as the man who shot him. When his next court date is announced as Thursday, Wells realizes he has somehow traveled back to the day before his death.

Wells tells Scully and Doggett that he cannot remember the previous few days. A nanny cam from his home shows that Wells was apparently the only person there around the time of Vicky's murder. He later discovers it is now Wednesday and realizes he is "living the week backwards." Wells next awakens at Doggett's home and describes the killer, who has not yet been arrested. Retrieving the nanny cam, they discover someone disabled it using a remote known only to Wells, Vicky, and their nanny, Trina Galvez. At Galvez's home, they find Cesar Ocampo, who threatened Trina's family to gain entrance to the Wells' home. Ocampo reveals that his brother, Hector, was falsely convicted and hanged himself in jail. Wells had suppressed evidence in Hector's case, giving Cesar a motive for revenge.

Wells next awakens in a hotel room a little over two hours before Vicky's murder. Desperate to save her, he confesses his evidence suppression to Doggett and explains that Hector Ocampo's brother is seeking revenge. Wells rushes home and finds Vicky alive, but Cesar arrives and attacks them. As Cesar prepares to slit Vicky's throat, Doggett and Scully arrive and shoot him dead. Wells sees that Scully's watch is moving forward again, signaling that his journey backwards through time has ended. Wells eventually goes to prison for suppressing evidence—a punishment he feels he deserves.

== Production ==
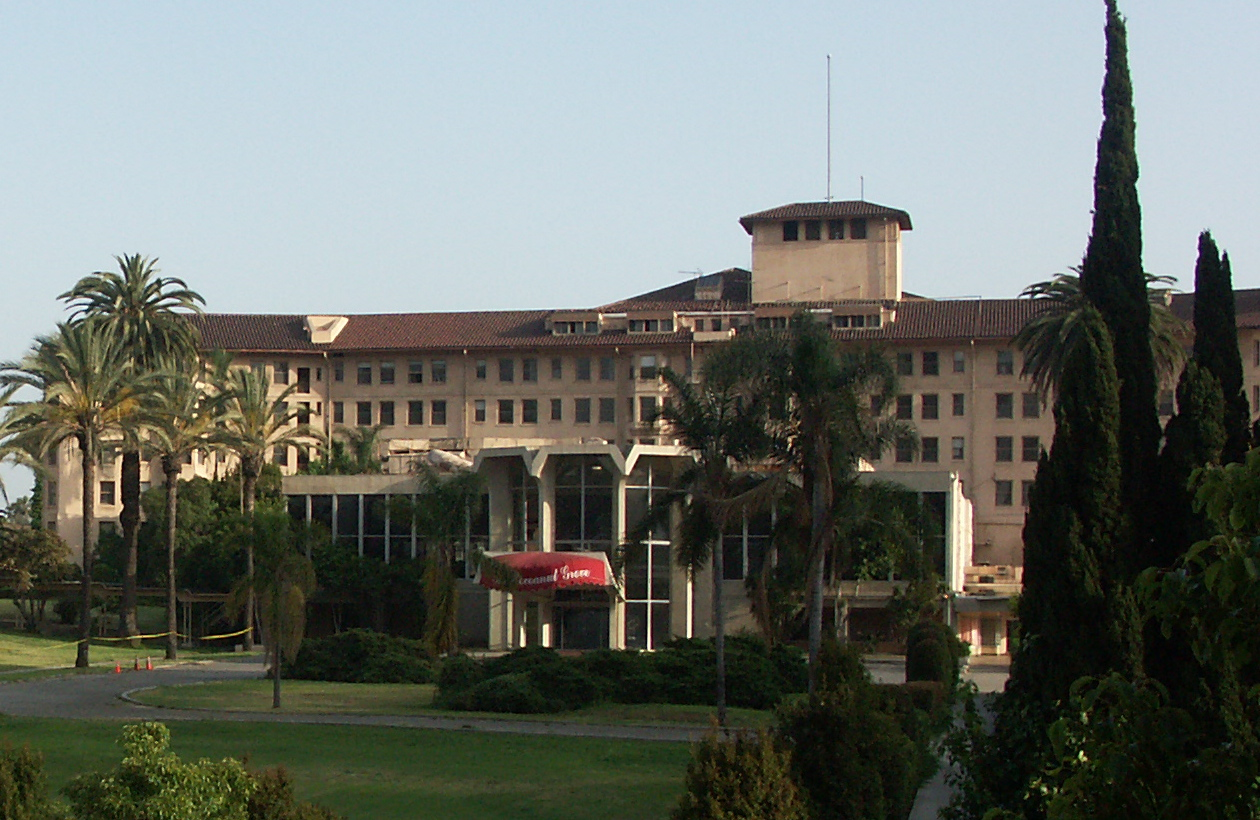
Wells' assassination scene was filmed at the Ambassador Hotel in Los Angeles

"Redrum", described as a "Twilight Zone-type thriller" in The Complete X-Files, was developed by Steven Maeda and Daniel Arkin, while the teleplay was written solely by Maeda. Maeda purposely picked the title to be the backwards spelling of "murder" (a device famously used by novelist—and one-time X-Files writer—Stephen King in his book The Shining). Maeda used the spider and its web to symbolize Martin Wells' confusion at being trapped in his situation.

Several of the names in the episode were allusions to historical figures or acquaintances of the writer. Most notably, Martin Wells is named after famed 19th century author H.G. Wells, noted for his contributions to science fiction with The Time Machine in 1896 and The War of the Worlds in 1898. Furthermore, the character of Janet Wilson, the lawyer of Wells, was named after Maeda's wife.

Wells was played by noted actor Joe Morton who had previously played a role in the 1991 sci-fi film Terminator 2: Judgment Day. Robert Patrick later noted that "Joe Morton is a fantastic actor. We never worked together in [Terminator 2], but we're in that movie together. And Joe was The Brother from Another Planet." The scene in which Martin Wells is assassinated was at the "legendary" Ambassador Hotel in Los Angeles. This location, which has been the shooting location for over 200 productions, is perhaps more infamous as the site of Presidential candidate Robert F. Kennedy's assassination by Sirhan Sirhan in 1968.

== Reception ==
"Redrum" first aired on Fox on December 10, 2000. The episode earned a Nielsen household rating of 8.1, meaning that it was seen by 8.1% of the nation's estimated households. The episode was seen by 13.2 million viewers. The episode ranked as the 40th most-watched episode for the week ending December 10. The episode subsequently aired in the United Kingdom on the BBC Two on April 14, 2002.

Critical reception to the episode was moderately positive. Juliette Harrisson of Den of Geek wrote positively of the episode, calling it "an excellent backwards episode, in which the audience is left satisfied that the horrific event that sparked it off has been prevented, but the guest protagonist has to pay a high price for the happy outcome." However, she was slightly critical that the episode "barely features the regular characters at all". Paula Vitaris from Cinefantastique gave the episode a moderately positive review and awarded it three stars out of four. She called the episode "a double mystery: on one hand Martin's investigation of his wife's murder; and on the other, an investigation into the workings of his own soul." Vitaris, too, was critical of the ending monologue, noting that "the voiceover ruins the mood of the final shot."

Zack Handlen of The A.V. Club awarded the episode a "B+", writing that it was an "example of an episode that starts off strong, only to fumble when it comes to the follow through". He was particularly praiseworthy towards Morton's performance, noting that his presence "more than makes up for" the lack of Doggett and Scully. He concluded of the episode that "it's smart that the script makes Wells in some way culpable for what happened, and tries to establish him as a merciless hard-ass" but that the "reveal is never really satisfying." Robert Shearman, in his book Wanting to Believe: A Critical Guide to The X-Files, Millennium & The Lone Gunmen, gave the episode a moderately positive review and rated it three-and-a-half stars out of five. The author noted that the episode was "constructed with great skill by Steven Maeda and Daniel Arkin." Despite this, Shearman noted that "with the series in flux, this is an especially unhelpful time to attempt an episode which so abandons the house style; The X-Files urgently needs to assert what it is, not what it isn't."

== Bibliography ==
- Hurwitz, Matt; Knowles, Chris (2008). The Complete X-Files. Insight Editions. ISBN 978-1933784809.
- Miles, Lawrence; Lars Pearson; Christia Dickson (2003). Dusted. Mad Norwegian Press. ISBN 0972595902.
- Shearman, Robert (2009). Wanting to Believe: A Critical Guide to The X-Files, Millennium & The Lone Gunmen. Mad Norwegian Press. ISBN 978-0975944691.

This article incorporates material derived from the "Redrum" article on the X-Files wiki at Fandom (formerly Wikia) and is licensed under the Creative Commons Attribution-Share Alike 3.0 License (May 2, 2012).
