= Mireille Dargent =

French film actress

- Born: Mireille d'Argent; 1951 (age 74–75); France
- Occupation: Actress
- Years active: 1971–1976

Mireille Dargent (born 1951) is a French film actress.

== Career ==
She is best known for appearing in Jean Rollin films, like Requiem pour un vampire, alongside Marie-Pierre Castel in the two leading roles. When an agent introduced Mireille to Rollin, Rollin discovered he was stealing her wages and keeping them for himself. Rollin hired a lawyer for Mireille and the agent was made to pay back everything to Mireille. Her other appearances in Rollin's films include La rose de fer (The Iron Rose), Les démoniaques (The Demoniacs) and Lèvres de sang (Lips of Blood). Mireille has also worked with directors Pierre Chevalier, Marius Lesoeur and Jacques Orth. She has been credited in her films as "Dily D'Argent" and "Dily Dargent".

== Filmography ==
- 1971: Requiem pour un Vampire as 'Michelle'
- 1973: Avortement clandestin as 'Sophie Beltois'
- 1973: La rose de fer as Clown in Cemetery
- 1974: Les démoniaques as Clown of the Haunted Ruins
- 1975: Lèvres de sang
- 1976: Paris Porno
- 2007: La nuit des horloges (archive images)
