= Sheriff of Wichita =

1949 film by R. G. Springsteen

- Theatrical release poster
- Directed by: R. G. Springsteen
- Screenplay by: Robert Creighton Williams
- Produced by: Gordon Kay
- Starring: Allan Lane; Eddy Waller; Roy Barcroft; Lyn Wilde; Clayton Moore; Gene Roth
- Cinematography: John MacBurnie
- Edited by: Tony Martinelli
- Music by: Stanley Wilson
- Production company: Republic Pictures
- Distributed by: Republic Pictures
- Release date: January 22, 1949
- Running time: 60 minutes
- Country: United States
- Language: English

Sheriff of Wichita is a 1949 American Western film directed by R. G. Springsteen and written by Robert Creighton Williams. The film stars Allan Lane, Eddy Waller, Roy Barcroft, Lyn Wilde, Clayton Moore and Gene Roth. The film was released on January 22, 1949, by Republic Pictures.

== Cast ==
- Allan Lane as Sheriff Rocky Lane
- Black Jack as Black Jack
- Eddy Waller as Nugget Clark
- Roy Barcroft as Sam Stark
- Lyn Wilde as Nancy Bishop
- Clayton Moore as Raymond D'Arcy
- Gene Roth as Howard Thornton
- Trevor Bardette as Captain Ira Flanders
- House Peters, Jr. as Deputy Jack Thorpe
- Earle Hodgins as Jess Jenkins
- Edmund Cobb as U.S. Marshal James
- John Hamilton as Prison Warden
- Steve Raines as Henchman Will
- Jack O'Shea as Henchman Joe
