= Invocation (The X-Files) =

- The X-Files episode
- Episode no.: Season 8 Episode 5
- Directed by: Richard Compton
- Written by: David Amann
- Production code: 8ABX06
- Original air date: December 3, 2000
- Running time: 44 minutes

Guest appearances
- Erich Anderson as Doug Underwood; Maggie Baird as Sharon Pearl; Barry Cullison as Sheriff Sanchez; Rodney Eastman as Ronald Purnell; Jake Fritz as Luke Doggett; Kim Greist as Lisa Underwood; Colton James as Josh Underwood; Kyle Pepi & Ryan Pepi as Billy Underwood; Leslie Sachs as Lisa Underwood's friend; Sheila Shaw as Marcia Purnell; Steve Stapenhorst as Principal; Jim Cody Williams as Cal Jeppy

Episode chronology
← Previous "Roadrunners"	Next → "Redrum"
- The X-Files season 8

"Invocation" is the fifth episode of the eighth season of the American science fiction television series The X-Files. It premiered on the Fox network on December 3, 2000. The episode was written by David Amman and directed by Richard Compton. "Invocation" is a "monster-of-the-week" story, unconnected to the series' wider mythology. The episode received a Nielsen rating of 8.2 and was viewed by 13.9 million viewers. Overall, the episode received mixed reviews from critics.

The series centers on FBI special agents Dana Scully (Gillian Anderson) and her new partner John Doggett (Robert Patrick)—following the alien abduction of her former partner, Fox Mulder (David Duchovny)—who work on cases linked to the paranormal, called X-Files. In this episode, a little boy mysteriously reappears after having been kidnapped for ten years. However, he has not aged one bit after his disappearance. While the case stirs up painful memories for Doggett, suspicion stirs that the boy is not all he seems.

"Invocation" would introduce both the character of Luke Doggett, the deceased son of John Doggett, as well as a story arc involving his father trying to solve his murder. A majority of the episode was filmed in Pasadena, California.

== Plot ==
In 1990, Billy Underwood goes missing at a school fair in Dexter, Oklahoma. Ten years later, Billy's mother Lisa Underwood is called to the local elementary school. She learns that Billy has mysteriously re-appeared at the school, but does not seem to have aged in the decade he was missing.

Dana Scully (Gillian Anderson) and John Doggett (Robert Patrick) arrive at the police station to see Billy. Doggett interviews the boy, who seems to be mute. In an attempt to get Billy to speak, Doggett keeps his backpack from him. This infuriates Lisa and leads Scully to question Doggett’s expertise in child abduction cases. Scully suggests that Billy is an alien abductee, but Doggett believes Ronald Purnell, a local delinquent, may have been involved in the boy's disappearance. Doggett questions Purnell, who expresses confusion when the agent suggests that he should meet Billy. As Doggett sits in his car, he pulls out a school photo of a young boy.

When Billy is returned home, his brother and father are uneasy about his presence; Lisa is blind to these problems. While Lisa and her husband Doug argue about Billy, he wanders into his brother’s room holding a knife. Lisa finds a bloody knife in Josh's bed the next morning, although the boy is unscathed. Billy stands in the room staring at Josh. Forensic analysis shows the blood to be Billy's, although there are no injuries on him. The knife bears a crude star-like symbol that Billy drew while being interrogated by Doggett, a symbol that was also drawn by a psychic investigator who worked with the police following Billy's disappearance ten years earlier. The Underwoods reluctantly agree to let Billy speak with the psychic, but when Doug attempts to drive him to the meeting, Billy seemingly disappears from inside the family minivan, only to reappear in Josh's room, frightening Josh with his silent staring. Meanwhile, at Purnell's trailer, his mother's boyfriend, Cal Jeppy, shows up and hassles him. Purnell goes into the woods and digs up a skull. Later, Jeppy blackmails Purnell into silence over something related to Billy.

Scully and Doggett bring the psychic, Sharon Pearl, to meet Billy. After touching Billy, Pearl says that she feels powerful forces acting through him, and that she senses emanations from Doggett as well, claiming he lost someone just like Billy. She then appears to suffer a seizure and the mysterious symbol forms on her forehead. As Scully and Doggett discuss Sharon's condition, Scully plays a taped recording of her utterances while having the seizure, then reverses the tape to reveal a child's voice singing a lullaby, All The Pretty Little Horses. They notice Purnell driving up to the Underwood home and Doggett gets out to question Purnell. Purnell panics when he sees Billy inside his car, driving off when Doggett also sees the child, but after a short pursuit, Purnell is arrested and the agents fail to find Billy in the vehicle. Elsewhere in town at a gas station, Josh Underwood is lured from his father's car by a pony and horse trailer. As his abduction unfolds, the star-like symbol Billy and the psychic drew is shown to be a painted logo on the trailer for Cal's Pony Ride-Along.

After interrogation by Doggett, Purnell confesses to snatching Billy in 1990 on behalf of someone else. Doggett recognizes Purnell was also a victim, and with enough prodding, gets a name: Cal Jeppy. The police and the two FBI agents go to Jeppy’s home and find Josh in a compartment under the floor of his horse trailer. Doggett chases Jeppy into the woods, catches him, and, after catching a glimpse of Billy, discovers the skull Purnell dug up earlier where the now vanished boy was standing. As the Underwoods grieve over the shallow grave of their long-dead son, Doggett expresses incredulity that the case's conclusion was an instance of justice from beyond the grave and laments their inability to explain it. Scully, however, reasons that the body is explanation enough and that the important thing is that Josh Underwood was saved from the same fate.

== Production ==
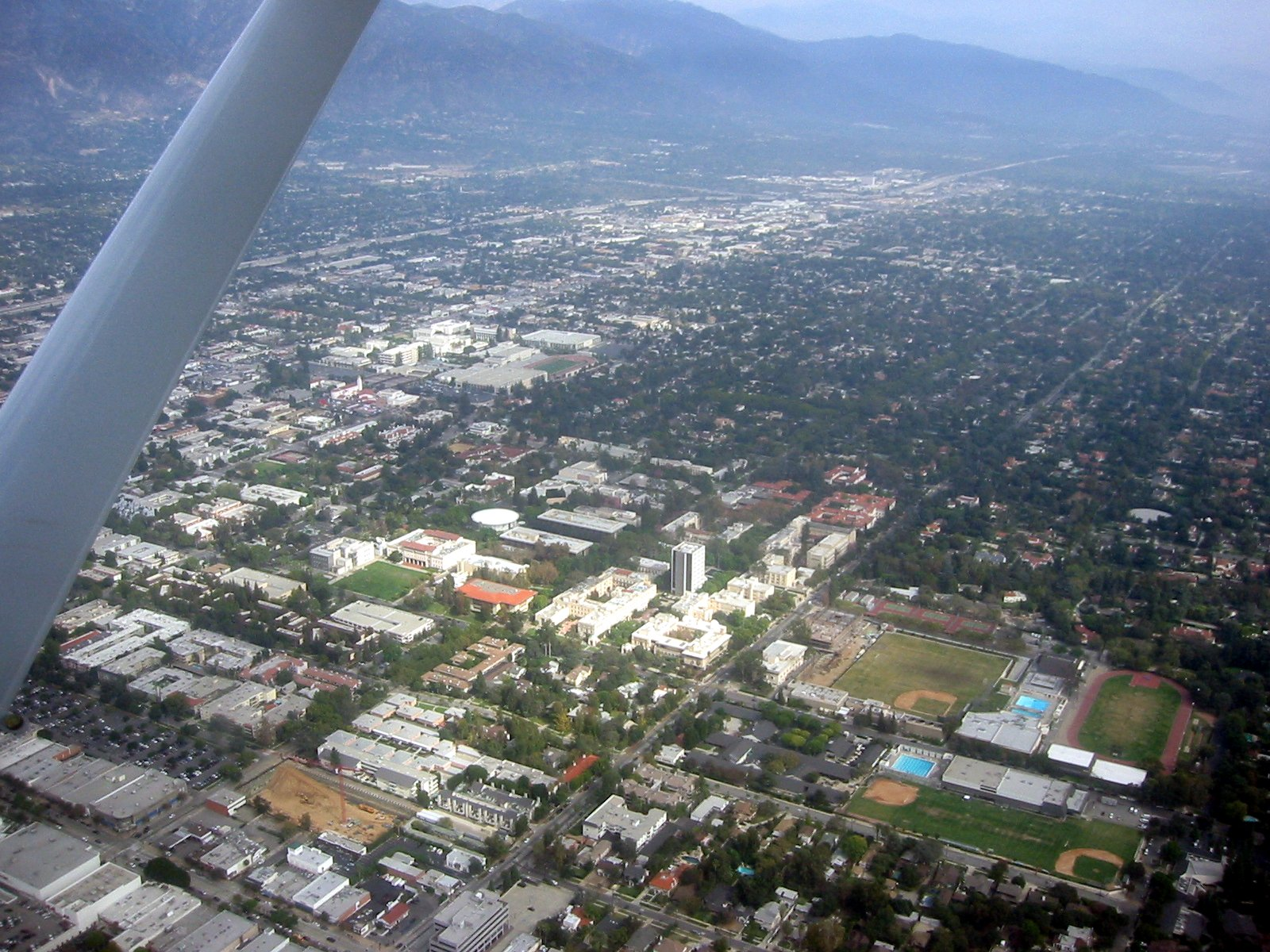
Many of the episode's scenes were filmed in Pasadena, California.

"Invocation" was written by producer David Amann, and marked his fifth script contribution to the series. "Invocation" was the first of two episodes of The X-Files to be directed by Richard Compton; he would later go on to direct the eighth season episode "Medusa". Although the episode was the fifth aired in the season, it was actually the sixth one filmed, as evidenced by its production number. A majority of the episode was filmed in Pasadena, California. Many of the extras from the episode auditioned via General Casting, a casting agency.

In the episode, Doggett is told by a psychic that his very own son was kidnapped and murdered; thus, "Invocation" would mark the first appearance of Luke Doggett, the son of John. Luke's story would develop into an arc featuring Doggett trying to find out the truth about his son's murder. Robert Patrick noted "['Invocation' started] a very important arc, because you start to see the vulnerability of the Doggett character, what drives him. That's where we first realize something's happened to him. There's a tragedy that's involved with him."

The song that Ronald Purnell sang to Billy to keep him quiet and that was featured as a backmasked message on Scully's tape-recorder is a traditional African American lullaby from the American South called "All the Pretty Horses".

== Reception ==
"Invocation" first aired on Fox on December 3, 2000. The episode earned a Nielsen household rating of 8.2, meaning that it was seen by 8.2% of the nation's estimated households. The episode was seen by 13.9 million viewers. The episode ranked as the 41st most-watched episode for the week ending December 3. The episode aired in the United Kingdom and Ireland on Sky1 on March 8, 2001 and received 0.64 million viewers, making it the eighth most watched episode that week.

Zack Handlen of The A.V. Club awarded the episode a "B−", writing that it is "an okay entry that’s kept from being completely forgettable by some memorable shots […] and some decent Scully/Doggett banter." Handlen held a mixed feeling toward's Doggett's backstory, noting that its introduction "does push the character in ways that undermine some of his strongest traits". Robert Shearman, in his book Wanting to Believe: A Critical Guide to The X-Files, Millennium & The Lone Gunmen, rated the episode two-and-a-half stars out of five. The author praised Amman's ability to "elicit real-world reactions out of fantastical situations". However, Shearman took issue with the way Doggett's backstory was extrapolated. He noted that Doggett had been portrayed, up to the point in the series, as a "solid and reliable" character. However, "Invocation" sees him "[break] protocol and [behave] like a bully" because of a case reminiscent of that of his deceased son's, a situation that, the author reasons, is too similar to Mulder's own search for the truth about his sister, Samantha. Paula Vitaris from Cinefantastique gave the episode a mixed review and awarded it two stars out of four. Vitaris bluntly wrote, "'Invocation' is a masterpiece, but only if you grade it on a 'Roadrunners' bell-curve." She elaborated, calling it "a run-of-the-mill stand-alone, a combination of 'Revelations' and 'The Calusari'"

== Bibliography ==
- Fraga, Erica (2010). LAX-Files: Behind the Scenes with the Los Angeles Cast and Crew. CreateSpace. ISBN 9781451503418.
- Hurwitz, Matt; Knowles, Chris (2008). The Complete X-Files. Insight Editions. ISBN 978-1933784809.
- Shearman, Robert (2009). Wanting to Believe: A Critical Guide to The X-Files, Millennium & The Lone Gunmen. Mad Norwegian Press. ISBN 978-0975944691.

This article incorporates material derived from the "Invocation" article on the X-Files wiki at Fandom (formerly Wikia) and is licensed under the Creative Commons Attribution-Share Alike 3.0 License (May 11, 2012).
