= Twice Blessed (film) =

1945 film by Harry Beaumont

- Theatrical release poster
- Directed by: Harry Beaumont
- Screenplay by: Ethel Hill; Michael Kraike; Mortimer Braus
- Produced by: Arthur Field
- Starring: Preston Foster; Gail Patrick; Lee Wilde; Lyn Wilde
- Cinematography: Ray June
- Edited by: Douglass Biggs
- Music by: David Snell
- Production company: Metro-Goldwyn-Mayer
- Distributed by: Loew's Inc.
- Release date: May 31, 1945
- Running time: 76 minutes
- Country: United States
- Language: English

Twice Blessed is a 1945 American comedy film directed by Harry Beaumont and starring Preston Foster, Gail Patrick, and Lee and Lyn Wilde. It was an MGM vehicle for the Wilde twins, who were first introduced in Andy Hardy's Blonde Trouble (1944).

== Plot summary ==
Stephanie and Terry are identical twins who have been split up since their parents divorced seven years before. Although identical in appearance, the twins are very different: Stephanie is shy but brilliant, while Terry is outgoing and loves dancing. When the twins reunite, each envies the life style of the other. They decide, without telling their father Jeff or their mother Mary, to switch families for a day or two.

The switch quickly starts trouble, for both twins. Stephanie, disguised as Terry, is expected to win a jitterbug contest, but she cannot dance. Terry, disguised as Stephanie, is expected to behave quietly and properly, but she just wants to have fun. The boyfriends of the twins are surprised to see their girlfriends acting so different: Mickey is happy to see Stephanie (actually Terry) is more confident, while Jimmy is pleased to see Terry (actually Stephanie) is more gentle.

Mickey takes Stephanie to a charity event, where Stephanie surprises him with her dancing talent. Soon after, Mickey gets into a fight with a rude dancer, and the charity event erupts into a brawl. A reporter named Alice (Jeff's ex-girlfriend) photographs Stephanie dancing wildly and caught up in the fight, and plans to blackmail Stephanie's father to force him to marry her. The twins team up with their new boyfriends to successfully outsmart Alice, reunite their parents, and find true love.

== Cast ==
- Preston Foster as Jeff Turner
- Gail Patrick as Mary Hale
- Lee Wilde as Terry Turner
- Lyn Wilde as Stephanie Hale
- Richard Gaines as Senator John Pringle
- Jean Porter as Kitty
- Marshall Thompson as Jimmy
- Jimmy Lydon as Mickey Pringle
- Gloria Hope as Alice
- Douglas Cowan as Jake
- Warren Mills as Whitey
- Joel Friedkin as Mr. Winters
- Ralph Brooke as Chet
- Ralph Hoopes as Lionel
- Don Hayden as Alfi
- Tommy Bond as Horace
- Ethel Smith as Herself at the organ

== Gallery ==
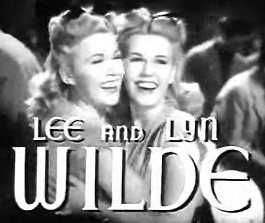
Lee and Lyn Wilde

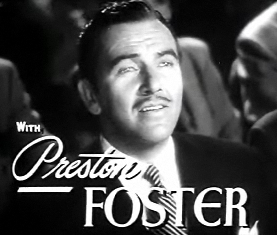
Preston Foster

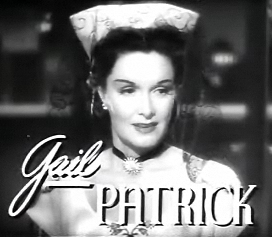
Gail Patrick
