= Lee and Lyn Wilde =

American actresses

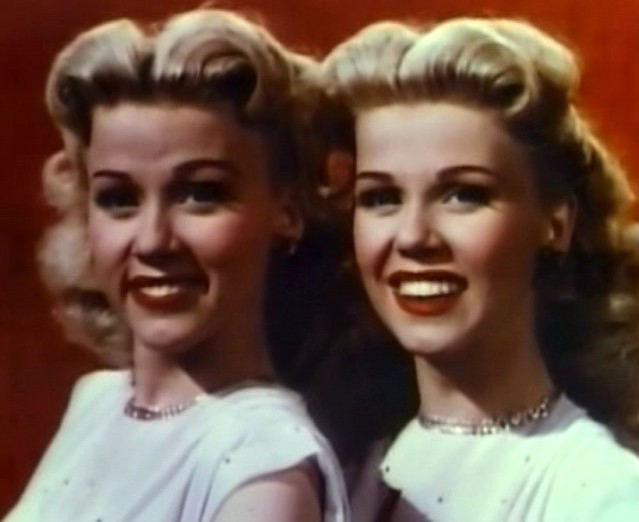
- Lyn (left) and Lee Wilde in Till the Clouds Roll By (1946)

Lee Wilde
- Born: Marion Lee Wilde; October 10, 1922; East St. Louis, Illinois, U.S.
- Died: September 7, 2015 (aged 92)
- Occupation: Actress
- Years active: 1940–1949
- Spouse: Thomas Matthew Cathcart (m. 1947; died 2010)

Lyn Wilde
- Born: Mary Lyn Wilde; October 11, 1922; East St. Louis, Illinois, U.S.
- Died: September 11, 2016 (aged 93); Michigan City, Indiana, U.S.
- Occupation: Actress
- Years active: 1940–1953
- Spouse(s): Jim Cathcart (m. 1942; died 1970) Dwight Oberlink (m. 1973; died 1996)
- Children: 2, including James Carter Cathcart

Lee and Lyn Wilde, sometimes billed as The Wilde Twins, were twin sisters who appeared in films of the early to mid-1940s.

== Early years ==
Born in East St. Louis, Illinois, Lee was the older of the two, born shortly before midnight of October 10, 1922, with Lyn born in the early hours of the following morning.

They began singing with their siblings in church, and by their teens were singing hymns for their local radio station, as well as performing in Illinois and Kentucky. They graduated from East St. Louis Senior High School in 1939.

== Singing ==
By 1940 they were band singers, and in 1942 they made their film debuts as vocalists for the Charlie Barnet Band, performing one song in the Harriet Hilliard film Juke Box Jenny. They also performed with Bob Crosby for a short while.

== Film ==
The twins' live performances led to another featured film appearance in the Judy Garland film Presenting Lily Mars in 1942. Joe Pasternak was very impressed by them and signed them to a seven-year contract with Metro-Goldwyn-Mayer studios. They played roles in Andy Hardy's Blonde Trouble (1944), followed by Twice Blessed, a film written specifically to introduce them to a wider audience.

The sisters appeared in nine films together up until 1949. Lyn briefly continued her film career after that, appearing in six more films until 1953.

== Personal lives ==
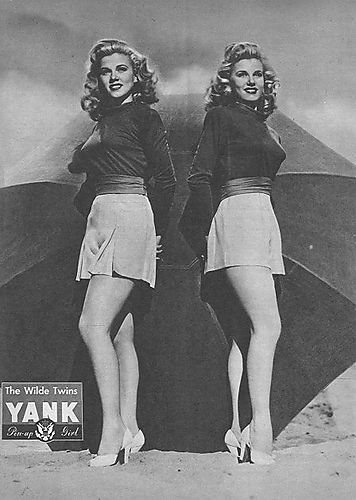
Lee and Lyn Wilde from 1945 issue of Yank Magazine.

The twins married brothers Jim (who married Lyn in 1942) and Tom Cathcart (who married Lee February 22, 1947, in Michigan City, Indiana). They focused their attentions on family life rather than continuing in show business, but they retained a love of music.

In 1948, Lee was reported to be "seriously ill following a caesarian operation" at Good Samaritan Hospital in Hollywood. She had given birth to a daughter on September 28.

After leaving show business, Lee pursued many activities, including flying. She earned her pilot's license in 1961. She also attended college in Palm Desert, earning an associate degree from College of the Desert, and later graduated with a Bachelor of Arts degree in Foreign Languages from the University of California, Irvine. In 1989, they recorded a reunion album titled Back to Together Once Again and continued to perform occasionally into the 1990s.

Lyn had two children, James Carter (1954–2025) and Lee Ann, with her first husband. After her husband's death in 1970, she remarried to Dwight Oberlink in 1973. They remained married until Oberlink's death in 1996. Her son also became an actor and musician. She also had four grandchildren, four great-grandchildren, three stepchildren, and seven step-grandchildren.

Lyn died on September 11, 2016, at age 93. Her twin sister Lee predeceased her in 2015.

== Filmography ==
Feature films
Year	Film	Role	Notes
1942	Snowtime Serenade		Universal Musical Short, with Gloria Jean and the Sportsmen
1942	Juke Box Jenny	Themselves	Universal, singing "Fifty Million Nickels" with the Charlie Barnet Band
1943	Reveille with Beverly	Themselves	Columbia, singing "Big Noise From Winetka" with Bob Crosby & His Band
1943	Presenting Lily Mars	Themselves	MGM, singing "When You Think of Lovin', Baby, Think of Me" w/Bob Crosby and His Band
1944	Two Girls and a Sailor	Themselves	MGM, singing "Take It Easy" w/Lina Romay & Virginia O'Brien
1944	Andy Hardy's Blonde Trouble	Lyn and Lee Walker	MGM
1945	Twice Blessed	Lyn: Stephanie Hale; Lee: Terry Turner	MGM
1946	Till the Clouds Roll By	Themselves	MGM, singing "She Didn't Say Yes, She Didn't Say No"
1947	Campus Honeymoon	Lee: Patricia Hughes; Lyn: Skipper Hughes	Republic
1949	Look for the Silver Lining	Lee: Claire Miller; Lyn: Ruth Miller	Warner Bros.
1949	Tucson	Gertie Peck	Lyn only
1949	Sheriff of Wichita	Nancy Bishop	Lyn only
1951	Show Boat	chorus girl	MGM, Lyn only
1952	Singin' in the Rain	chorus girl	MGM, Lyn only
1952	Has Anybody Seen My Gal	Charleston Dancer	Lyn only
1952	The Belle of New York	one of Frenchie's Girls	Lyn only
1953	The Girl Next Door	Peggy	Lyn only

== See also ==
- Pin-ups of Yank, the Army Weekly
