= Campus Honeymoon =

1948 film by Richard Sale

- Theatrical release poster
- Directed by: Richard Sale
- Screenplay by: Jerome Gruskin; Richard Sale
- Story by: Thomas R. St. George
- Starring: Lyn Wilde; Lee Wilde; Adele Mara; Richard Crane; Hal Hackett; Wilson Wood
- Cinematography: John MacBurnie
- Edited by: Arthur Roberts
- Music by: Nathan Scott
- Production company: Republic Pictures
- Distributed by: Republic Pictures
- Release date: February 1, 1948
- Running time: 61 minutes
- Country: United States
- Language: English

Campus Honeymoon is a 1948 American comedy film directed by Richard Sale, written by Jerome Gruskin and Richard Sale, and starring Lyn Wilde, Lee Wilde, Adele Mara, Richard Crane, Hal Hackett and Wilson Wood. It was released on February 1, 1948 by Republic Pictures.

== Plot ==
Twin sisters Skipper and Patricia Hughes are new students at a college where homecoming soldiers Bob Watson and Rick Adams intend to enroll. Unable to find lodging required for enrollment, the foursome is invited by Bessie Ormsbee, a WAC, to take up residence in a veterans' housing facility, mistakenly believing them to be two married couples.

Bessie and husband Busby are in charge of the housing facility, which is opposed by Senator Hughes, uncle of the twins, who is trying to curb government funding. Trouble also ensues when their nephew Junior begins to suspect the four aren't married, and the sweethearts of Skipper and Bob show up on campus.

Bob proposes a marriage of convenience to Skipper, who declines, even though she's fallen in love with him. Senator Hughes, discovering the arrangement, points out that due to common-law marriages, the girls and guys are already legally husbands and wives. All four happily decide to keep it that way.

== Cast ==
- Lyn Wilde as Skipper Hughes
- Lee Wilde as Patricia Hughes
- Adele Mara as Bessie Ormsbee
- Richard Crane as Robert Watson
- Hal Hackett as Richard Adams
- Wilson Wood as Busby Ormsbee
- Stephanie Bachelor as Dean Carson
- Teddy Infuhr as Junior Ormsbee
- Edwin Maxwell as Sen. Hughes
- Boyd Irwin as Dr. Shumway
- Kay Morley as Polly Walker
- Charles Smith as Benjie Briggs
- Edward Gargan as Motorcycle Cop
- Maxine Semon as Waitress
- William Simon as Messenger
