= Rene the Cane =

- Directed by: Francis Girod
- Written by: Francis Girod; Jacques Rouffio
- Starring: Gérard Depardieu; Sylvia Kristel; Michel Piccoli
- Cinematography: Aldo Tonti
- Music by: Ennio Morricone
- Release date: 1977
- Language: French

Rene the Cane (French: René la Canne; Italian: Tre simpatiche carogne) is a 1977 French-Italian crime film directed by Francis Girod and starring Sylvia Kristel and Gérard Depardieu.

It was released in France in 1977 and recorded admissions of 534,714.

== Cast ==
- Gérard Depardieu: René Bornier
- Sylvia Kristel: Krista
- Michel Piccoli: Inspector Marchand
- Stefano Patrizi: Gino
- Riccardo Garrone: Karl
- Jacques Jouanneau: Fourgue
- Jean Rigaux: Vieuchêne
- Orchidea De Santis: Kim
- Venantino Venantini: Carlo
- Valérie Mairesse: Martine
- Jean Carmet: Cannes Police Commissioner
- Maria van der Meer: Krista's Mother
- Annie Walther: Martha
- Doris Walther: Bretzel
- Georges Conchon
- Évelyne Bouix
- Catherine Castel
- Marie-Pierre Castel
