= The Demoniacs =

Les démoniaques
- Theatrical release poster
- Directed by: Jean Rollin
- Written by: Jean Rollin
- Starring: Joëlle Coeur; Lieva Lone; Patricia Hermenier; John Rico; Willy Braque
- Edited by: Michel Patient
- Music by: Pierre Raph
- Distributed by: Général Films; Les Films A.B.C.; Nordia Films
- Release date: 5 December 1974
- Running time: 100 minutes
- Countries: France; Belgium
- Language: French

Les démoniaques (English: The Demoniacs; also known as Curse of the Living Dead) is a 1974 French rape and revenge supernatural horror film written and directed by Jean Rollin, and starring Joëlle Coeur, Lieva Lone, Patricia Hermenier, John Rico, and Willy Braque.

== Plot ==
A band of notorious shipwreckers force a ship to crash and they ransack its contents; led by the Captain, the group also includes two subordinates, Le Bosco and Paul, and the Captain's lover, Tina. The ruthless gang brutally attack two young women survivors of the wreck by raping and beating them, causing Tina to become sexually aroused.

While drinking in a local tavern, the Captain begins to have visions of the women's dead bodies. The tavern’s landlady, Louise, a clairvoyant, suspects that he has a guilty conscience, which riles him up into a frenzy. A bar fight erupts as Le Bosco and Paul attempt to bring the Captain under control. Word gets around that spectres of the two women were seen wandering around a ship cemetery, near haunted ruins, where a demon has been imprisoned for a century. The community fears the ruins, and believe the demon's return is imminent.

The shipwreckers believe that the women are still alive and track them to the ship cemetery, intent on killing them. They set fire to the ships as a means to lure them out and Tina attacks them, before they fight her off and escape. They make their way to the haunted ruins with Tina in pursuit. She is stopped by the Captain, as even he and the other wreckers fear the grounds.

Upon arrival, the women meet a friendly clown and an Exorcist. The Exorcist informs the demon that the women have arrived and tells him to have mercy on them if they wish to free him from his confinement. The women remain mute due their ordeal, and the Exorcist agrees to aid them in their revenge against the shipwreckers. However, he explains that the only way to seek their revenge is to free the man imprisoned within the ruins, who is possessed by a demon, and that he is unpredictable, which could ultimately lead to either their peace or their death.

The Captain remains on the cusp of complete madness, skeptical of whether the women are alive or dead and is convinced that they are coming for him. The demon eventually calls the two women to his dungeon; Louise is able to guide them telepathically, and helps them unlock the door. The demon makes a pact with the women, making love to them, and temporarily providing them with his entire power, whereby they become the "demoniacs" of the title.

The women enter the tavern. Le Bosco lunges at them with a blade, stabbing one but she does not die. The shipwreckers flee. Tina taunts the men for being cowardly and heads to the tavern, where she kills Louise. She goes to the haunted ruins to make her attack and the women use telekinesis, causing statues to fly at her. Tina is almost crushed beneath one of them, but manages to slip away. Meanwhile the men have seriously wounded the clown and the Exorcist. The only way to save them is for the women to sacrifice their revenge and instead remain by their side to keep them alive using their powers. These will eventually diminish and return to the demon by morning. The women forgo their revenge and the clown and Exorcist are revived. The demon wishes the women luck. After they leave he tells the clown and Exorcist that they are fated to die, as are their attackers.

The following morning, the women are walking along the beach and encounter Paul, who is drunk and charges at them with a glass bottle, before stumbling, breaking the bottle, and cutting his throat with the broken shards. The women are then ambushed by the Captain and Le Bosco who tie them to the remains of a burnt ship and rape them at Tina's request, while she pleasures herself. The Captain, suddenly overcome with guilt and regret, strangles Tina to death, before stabbing Le Bosco. Having found redemption, he attempts to rescue the women before the tide comes in, but ultimately drowns along with them. The Exorcist and the clown look on in despair as they disappear beneath the sea.

== Cast ==
- Joëlle Coeur as Tina
- John Rico as Le Capitaine
- Willy Braque as Le Bosco
- Paul Bisciglia as Paul - un naufrageur
- Lieva Lone as La première démoniaque
- Patricia Hermenier as La deuxième démoniaque
- Louise Dhour as Louise
- Ben Zimet as L'exorciste Chadron
- Mireille Dargent as Le clown
- Miletic Zivomir as Le Diable

== Home media ==
Les démoniaques was released on DVD in the United States (region 1) on 21 September 1999 via Redemption Films, in the United Kingdom (region 2) on 26 July 2004 by Redemption Films, and in France (region 2) on 27 January 2005 via LCJ Editions. A special three-disc set was made available in Europe, through Encore Entertainment, on 30 August 2005. It was re-released on DVD in the UK, from Redemption, on 24 August 2015.

The film was released on Blu-ray (along with DVD) in the United States, from Redemption, on 29 May 2012, while it was made available in Germany from Wicked Vision, on 31 March 2017, in limited edition Blu-rays sets, containing three different styles of cover art (500 units per set). The film received its first UK Blu-ray release on 5 February 2018 by Screenbound Pictures' subsidiary label, Black House Films.

Les démoniaques was again released on Blu-ray and 4K in the UK by Powerhouse Films on 29 April 2024 (limited to 4,000 and 6,000 units, respectively). The set contains the theatrical cut, the export cut (containing extended sex scenes), and the heavily edited U.S. version (also known as Curse of the Living Dead). Both sets are also available in the United States.
