= Our Little Family =

- Genre: Reality television
- Starring: Dan Hamill; Michelle Hamill; Jack Hamill; Cate Hamill; CeCe Hamill; Eliezer Rodas; Co-Estrella
- Country of origin: United States
- Original language: English
- No. of seasons: 2
- No. of episodes: 17

Production
- Running time: 21–42 minutes
- Production company: Discovery Studios

Original release
- Network: TLC (2015, 2018)
- Release: February 17 – October 27, 2015

Our Little Family is an American reality television series that premiered on the TLC cable network, on February 17, 2015. But was shown again on November 17, 2018. The series revolves around the Hamill family: a family of five that live with dwarfism. The family consists of parents Dan and Michelle, their son Jack, and fraternal twins CeCe and Cate.

== Episodes ==
=== Series overview ===
Season	Episodes	Originally released	
Season	Episodes	First released	Last released
1	8	February 17, 2015	March 17, 2015
2	9	August 25, 2015	October 27, 2015

=== Season 1 (2015) ===
No. overall	No. in season	Title	Original release date
1	1	"Meet the Hamills!"	February 17, 2015
2	2	"A Hamill Halloween"	February 17, 2015
3	3	"Our Little Family"	February 24, 2015
4	4	"It's Potty Training Time!"	February 24, 2015
5	5	"The Hamills Take on D.C."	March 3, 2015
6	6	"The Twins Turn Three"	March 3, 2015
7	7	"Giving Thanks and Making Space"	March 10, 2015
8	8	"New Holiday Traditions"	March 17, 2015

=== Season 2 (2015) ===
No. overall	No. in season	Title	Original release date
9	1	"A Mother's Day Surprise!"	August 25, 2015
10	2	"Let's Get Healthy"	September 1, 2015
11	3	"Size Doesn't Matter"	September 15, 2015
12	4	"Happy Father's Day, Daddy!"	September 22, 2015
13	5	"What's One More Hamill?"	September 29, 2015
14	6	"Independence Week for the Hamills"	October 6, 2015
15	7	"Hamill Hustle and Bustle"	October 13, 2015
16	8	"NYC, Here We Come!"	October 20, 2015
17	9	"Small Talk"	October 27, 2015
