= Catherine Castel =

French actress and director

- Born: Catherine Marie Simone Tricot; 5 February 1949; Villejuif, Val-de-Marne, France
- Died: 19 September 2018 (aged 69); Alès, Gard, Occitania, France
- Occupations: Actress, makeup artist
- Years active: 1969–2002
- Relatives: Marie-Pierre Castel (sister)

Catherine Marie Simone Tricot (5 February 1949 – 19 September 2018), known professionally as Catherine Castel, or Cathy Tricot, was a French actress and makeup artist.

== Career ==
She was best known for appearing in films directed by Jean Rollin, alongside her twin sister Marie-Pierre Castel. Catherine has appeared in several Rollin films with Marie-Pierre including his vampire classics The Nude Vampire and Lips of Blood and his erotic films Bacchanales Sexuelles and Hard Penetrations. She also appeared in several other Rollin films, such as La comtesse Ixe, Sexual Vibrations and The Fiancée of Dracula (2002), which was her final film.

Rollin originally wanted Castel to appear in his earlier films The Shiver of the Vampires and Requiem for a Vampire, but she became pregnant and the roles were offered to Marie-Pierre.

=== Other ===
She was a make-up artist for La comtesse Ixe and Phantasmes. She has been credited in films as "Cathy Tricot", "Catherine Tricot" and "Cathy Castel".

== Filmography ==
- 1969: La vampire nue (The Nude Vampire) - 'Georges' servant'
- 1974: Tout le mondeil en a deux (Bacchanales Sexuelles) - 'Une souris'
- 1975: Le Journal érotique d'un bûcheron (Erotic Diary) (later hardcore insert)
- 1975: Lèvres de sang (Lips of Blood) - 'Jumelle Vampire'
- 1975: Suce moi vampire (Suck Me Vampire) - 'Jumelle Vampire' (hard version of Lévres de Sang)
- 1975: À bout de sexe - 'La vendeuse'
- 1975: Les dépravées du plaisir (Le gibier)
- 1975: Phantasmes (Once Upon a Virgin)
- 1976: Introductions (Les weekends d'un couple pervers)
- 1976: Douces pénétraitions (La Romancière lubrique) - 'Une soubrette'
- 1976: La comtesse Ixe- 'Une invitée'
- 1976: Amours collectives - 'Cathy'
- 1976: Apothéose porno
- 1977: Coctail porno
- 1977: René la canne (Rene the Cane)
- 1977: Hard Penetration
- 1977: Vibrations Sexuelles (Sexual Vibrations)
- 1977: Saute-moi dessus
- 1977: Les queutardes
- 1977: Désirs et perversions
- 1982: Les Bachelières en chaleur (archive footage)
- 1984: Les Débordements vicieux de Stella (archive footage)
- 1989: Impudeur lesbiennes (direct-to-video)
- 2002: La fiancée de Dracula (The Fiancee of Dracula) - 'Soeur à la corde à sauter'
- 2007: La Nuit des horloges (archive footage)
