= Andy Hardy's Blonde Trouble =

1944 film by George B. Seitz

- Directed by: George B. Seitz
- Screenplay by: Harry Ruskin; William Ludwig; Agnes Christine Johnston
- Based on: characters created by Aurania Rouverol
- Produced by: Carey Wilson (uncredited)
- Starring: Lewis Stone; Mickey Rooney; Fay Holden; Sara Haden; Herbert Marshall
- Cinematography: Lester White
- Edited by: George White
- Music by: David Snell; Song: "Easy to Love"; Cole Porter
- Production company: Metro-Goldwyn-Mayer
- Distributed by: Loew's Inc.
- Release date: May 4, 1944 (New York City)
- Running time: 107 minutes
- Country: United States
- Language: English

Andy Hardy's Blonde Trouble is a 1944 romantic comedy film directed by George B. Seitz, the fourteenth in the series starring Mickey Rooney as Andy Hardy. In the film, Andy goes to college, but soon gets in trouble with some pretty female students.

== Plot ==
Blonde Trouble picks up from the previous installment of the Andy Hardy saga with Andy on a train to begin his college career at Wainwright College. While on the train, he meets Kay Wilson (Bonita Granville), and learns that Wainright College has just become a coeducational institution. The Dean of Wainwright College (and soon to be Andy's faculty advisor), Dr. Standish (Herbert Marshall) is also on the train. Dr. Standish's identity is not revealed to Andy until later.

Problems begin almost immediately for Andy as he learns his father forgot to give him his train ticket. Lyn and Lee Walker (Wilde Twins) are also on the train in a private cabin. They are on their way to Wainright College as well, but their father thinks Lee is on her way to spend some time with her aunt in Vermont. The twins can't handle the idea of being separated, so they travel together to Wainright College in hopes of passing themselves off as one student. On the train, and later at Wainwright, the twins pull the switcheroo on Andy, leaving him completely confused with this mysterious blonde's ever-changing behavior.

After discovering that they have run out of money, the twins coax Andy into giving them a total of $37.95 ($727.76 in 2026) cash before he realizes that he has been fooled. After classes at Wainwright College begin, Andy's troubles continue to build, causing him to consider quitting college. Before this happens, though, he manages to help the twins out of their trouble.

== Cast ==
- Lewis Stone as Judge James K. Hardy
- Mickey Rooney as Andrew "Andy" Hardy
- Fay Holden as Mrs. Emily Hardy
- Sara Haden as Aunt Milly Forrest
- Herbert Marshall as Dr. M.J. Standish
- Bonita Granville as Kay Wilson
- Jean Porter as Katy Anderson
- Keye Luke as Dr. Lee Wong Howe
- Lee Wilde as Lee Walker
- Lyn Wilde as Lyn Walker
- Marta Linden as Mrs. Townsend
- Emory Parnell as Train Conductor

== Production ==
Andy Hardy's Blonde Trouble was filmed at the MGM Studios in Culver City, California, with location shooting taking place at the University of Nevada at Reno. The film was shot from July to September 1943 prior to Mickey Rooney's induction into the US Army in June 1944; the film was released in 1944.

== See also ==
- List of American films of 1944
