= Project Runway season 16 =

Project Runway
- Season 16
- No. of tasks: 14
- No. of contestants: 16
- Winner: Kentaro Kameyama

Release
- Original network: Lifetime
- Original release: August 17 – November 30, 2017

Season chronology
- ← Previous; Season 15 Next → Season 17

Project Runway Season 16 is the sixteenth season of the television show Project Runway, appearing on Lifetime. The season began on Thursday, August 17, 2017. There are 16 designers competing to become "the next great American designer." Supermodel Heidi Klum, Marie Claire creative director Nina Garcia, and fashion designer Zac Posen are all returning as judges this season. Tim Gunn maintains his role as the workroom mentor. This was the last season to air on Lifetime and the last to feature Klum, Gunn, and Posen.

Season 16 was the first time the show emphasized diversity and inclusivity in the size of its models, who ranged from sizes 0 to 22.

== Contestants ==
Contestant	Age	Hometown	Finish	Outcome
Vincent "ChaCha" Yu	24	Taipei, Taiwan	Episode 1	16th place
Sentell McDonald	33	New York City, NY	Episode 2	15th place
Kudzanai Karidza	32	Atlanta, GA	Episode 3	14th place
Deyonte Weather	36	Lynnwood, WA	Episode 4	13th place
Aaron Myers	23	Brooklyn, NY	Episode 5	12th place
Samantha Rei	36	Minneapolis, MN	Episode 6	11th place
Shawn Buitendorp	27	Grand Ledge, MI	Episode 7	10th place
Claire Buitendorp	27	Grand Ledge, MI	Episode 8	Disqualified
Batani Khalfani	32	Inglewood, CA	Episode 9	7th place
Amy Bond	46	Los Angeles, CA	Episode 9	7th place
Michael Brambila	25	Oakland, CA	Episode 10	6th place
Kenya Freeman	37	Atlanta, GA	Episode 13	5th place
Margarita Alvarez	30	San Juan, Puerto Rico	Episode 14	4th place
Brandon Kee	24	San Francisco, CA	Episode 14	3rd place
Ayana Ife	27	Salt Lake City, UT	Episode 14	Runner-up
Kentaro Kameyama	38	Los Angeles, CA	Episode 14	Winner

- Batani was originally eliminated after Shawn, but returned to the competition following Claire's disqualification.

== Designer progress ==
Designers	1	2	3	4	5	6	7	8	9	10	11	12	13	14
Kentaro	IN	IN	LOW	HIGH	IN	WIN	HIGH	HIGH	IN	LOW	LOW	ADV	ADV	WINNER
Ayana	IN	WIN	IN	IN	IN	IN	IN	IN	HIGH	WIN	HIGH	ADV	ADV	RUNNER-UP
Brandon	HIGH	HIGH	WIN	IN	WIN	IN	HIGH	IN	HIGH	HIGH	WIN	ADV	ADV	3RD PLACE
Margarita	IN	IN	HIGH	IN	IN	LOW	WIN	LOW	HIGH	HIGH	SAFE	ADV	ADV	4TH PLACE
Kenya	HIGH	HIGH	IN	LOW	HIGH	HIGH	LOW	HIGH	IN	HIGH	HIGH	ADV	OUT	
Michael	IN	IN	IN	WIN	HIGH	IN	IN	LOW	WIN	OUT				
Amy	IN	LOW	IN	IN	IN	IN	LOW	IN	OUT					
Batani	LOW	HIGH	HIGH	IN	IN	IN	HIGH	OUT	OUT					
Claire	IN	LOW	IN	IN	LOW	LOW	LOW	DQ^{2}						
Shawn	LOW	LOW	IN	HIGH	IN	HIGH	WD^{1}							
Samantha	IN	LOW^{3}	IN	IN	LOW	OUT								
Aaron	IN	HIGH	IN	LOW	OUT									
Deyonte	WIN	IN	LOW	OUT										
Kudzanai	IN	IN	OUT											
Sentell	IN	OUT												
ChaCha	OUT													

^1: Claire and Shawn were the losing team, but the judges were unable to decide whom to eliminate, so they were tasked with creating a look in one hour to decide who is eliminated. Shawn forfeited the challenge to Claire and was eliminated.
^2: Claire won the challenge but was caught breaking the rules and was disqualified. The losing designer, Batani, was spared elimination. Due to Claire's disqualification, there was no winning designer. Though Brandon’s print will be available on coffee cups.
^3: Samantha was given positive critique despite being in a losing team.

The designer won Project Runway Season 16.
The designer advanced to Fashion Week.
The designer won the challenge.
The designer came in second but did not win the challenge.
The designer had one of the highest scores for that challenge, but did not win.
The designer had one of the lowest scores for that challenge, but was not eliminated.
The designer was in the bottom two, but was not eliminated.
The designer lost and was eliminated from the competition.
The designer lost, but was brought back to the competition by Tim Gunn.
The designer was disqualified from the competition.
The designer withdrew from the competition.

== Model progress ==
Model Progress Table
Model	1	2	3	4	5	6	7	8 ^{1}	9	10	11	12	13	14
Sanita	MB	SM	AM	AB	BT	KF	CB	–	BK	KF	MA	AI	KT	KT
Meisha	AB	AI	BT	BK	KT	KT	MA	–	MB	AI	BK	KT	AI	AI (2ND)
Liris	BK	CB	DW	KT	MB	MB	SB	–	AI	KT	KF	MA	BK	BK (3RD)
Jazzmine	BT	BK	CB	DW	MA	SR	MB	–	AB	BK	KT	KF	MA	MA (4TH)
Christina	SB	AM	AB	AI	BK	MA	BK	–	KF	MB	AI	BK	KF	
Janine	KF	MA	MB	SB	AI	SB	KT	–	KT	MA	OUT			
Sian	AM	AB	AI	BT	CB	CB	KF	–	MA	OUT				
Monique	DW	KF	KD	MB	AM	BT	AI	–	BT	OUT				
Colleen	CB	KT	KF	MA	SB	BK	AB	–	OUT					
Lena	KT	KD	MA	SR	AB	AI	BT	–	OUT					
Marsha	AI	BT	BK	CB	KF	AB	OUT							
Yordanos	CC	DW	KT	KF	SR	OUT								
Samantha	MA	SR	SB	AM	OUT									
Liz	KD	MB	SR	OUT										
Kylie	SM	SB	OUT											
Katie	SR	OUT												

^1: In episode 8, the designers had other clients as their models.

The model was paired with the winning designer of Project Runway Season 16.
The model wore the design that advanced the designer to fashion week.
The model wore the winning design.
The model wore the design with the second-highest score.
The model wore the design with one of the highest scores but did not win.
The model wore the design with one of the lowest scores.
The model wore the design that landed in the bottom 2.
The model wore the losing design.
The model was eliminated.

== Model assignments ==
Designer Legend

- Aaron Myers: AM
- Amy Bond: AB
- Ayana Ife: AI
- Batani-Khalfani: BT
- Brandon Kee: BK
- ChaCha: CC
- Claire Buitendorp: CB
- Deyonté Weather: DW
- Kentaro Kameyama: KT
- Kenya Freeman: KF
- Kudzanai Karidza: KD
- Margarita Alvarez: MA
- Michael Brambila: MB
- Samantha Rei: SR
- Sentell McDonald: SM
- Shawn Buitendorp: SB

== Episodes ==
=== Episode 0: Road to the Runway ===
Original airdate: August 10, 2017 (présentation des candidats)

=== Episode 1: One Size Does Not Fit All ===
Original airdate: August 17, 2017

The designers enter Season 16 in style as they must create a red carpet look that demonstrates their fashion point of view. But the real surprise comes when the designers learn they will be working with models of all sizes!

- Challenge: Create a red carpet look with your own signature style.
- Judges: Heidi Klum, Nina Garcia, Zac Posen
- Guest Judge: Olivia Munn
- WINNER: Deyonté
- ELIMINATED: ChaCha

=== Episode 2: An Unconventional Recycling ===
Original airdate: August 24, 2017

In their first team challenge, the designers struggle to make their voices heard. However, this is an unconventional materials challenge and many of them stumble when forced to create a fashion forward look out of recyclable materials.

Team Name	Team Members
Ballin' on a Budget	Batani, Aaron, Kenya, Brandon, Ayana
Wabi-Sabi	Margarita, Kentaro, Deyonté, Kudzanai, Michael
Tsunami	Sentell, Samantha, Amy, Shawn, Claire

- Challenge: Create a high fashion mini collection from recycled materials.
- Judges: Heidi Klum, Nina Garcia, Zac Posen
- Guest Judge: Maggie Q & Anne Fulenwider
- WINNER: Ayana
- ELIMINATED: Sentell

=== Episode 3: A Leap of Innovation! ===
Original airdate: August 31, 2017

The designers are treated to a private screening of the film Leap! as well as a performance by Hiplet and must draw inspiration for an innovative and edgy design in order to survive another week.

- Challenge: Create a look inspired by dance, movement and innovation.
- Judges: Heidi Klum, Nina Garcia, Zac Posen
- Guest Judge: Maddie Ziegler
- WINNER: Brandon
- ELIMINATED: Kudzanai

=== Episode 4: We're Sleeping Wear? ===
Original airdate: September 7, 2017

It’s the Heidi Klum Sleepwear Challenge and the designers are feeling on top of the world, literally. If a slumber party on the roof of the Empire State Building doesn’t bring them the inspiration they need to impress Heidi, nothing will!

- Challenge: Create a sleepwear look for Heidi Klum Intimates.
- Judges: Heidi Klum, Nina Garcia, Zac Posen
- Guest Judge: Demi Lovato
- WINNER: Michael
- ELIMINATED: Deyonté

=== Episode 5: Descending into Good and Evil ===
Original airdate: September 14, 2017

Drawing inspiration from the hit film Descendants 2, the designers visit Lyndhurst Castle and are tasked with creating a look that represents “Good” or “Evil.” Most of the results are angelic, but as always, the devil is in the details.

Inspiration	Assigned Designers
Good	Amy, Brandon, Kentaro, Aaron, Ayana, Claire
Evil	Michael, Kenya, Samantha, Shawn, Margarita, Batani

- Challenge: Create an evening wear look inspired by good or evil.
- Judges: Heidi Klum, Nina Garcia, Zac Posen
- Guest Judge: Dove Cameron & China Anne McClain
- WINNER: Brandon
- ELIMINATED: Aaron

=== Episode 6: Models Off Duty ===
Original airdate: September 21, 2017

The models become much more than runway eye candy as they serve for inspiration to the designers to create a street style look, to be featured in a photo shoot. But ceding creative control to the models proves to be a difficult chore for some designers.

- Challenge: Create a streetwear look for models on their day off.
- Judges: Heidi Klum, Nina Garcia, Zac Posen
- Guest Judge: Georgina Chapman & Kelsea Ballerini
- WINNER: Kentaro
- ELIMINATED: Samantha

=== Episode 7: The Ultimate Faceoff ===
Original airdate: September 28, 2017

It’s the JC Penney Challenge and the designers must use men’s fabrics and designs to create a fashion forward look for their female models. Not only that, they must work in teams to do it, leading to a runway elimination that no one saw coming!

Teams
Kentaro & Brandon
Amy & Kenya
Claire & Shawn
Margarita & Batani
Michael & Ayana

- Challenge: Create a stylish fall outfit inspired by menswear.
- Guest Judge: Asia Kate Dillon
- WINNER: Margarita
- ELIMINATED: Shawn
  - In a twist, after Claire and Shawn are declared the losing team, they are given one hour to create all-new looks, in competition against each other. Shawn forfeited the challenge and was eliminated.

=== Episode 8: Client on the Go ===
Original airdate: October 5, 2017

The designers are tasked with creating an on-the-go look for friends and family of the Project Runway crew, but the good spirited challenge takes an ugly turn when accusations of cheating cloud the results of a contentious runway.

- Challenge: Create a print and head-to-toe look.
- Judges: Heidi Klum, Nina Garcia, Zac Posen
- Guest Judge: Sophia Stallone & Yolanda Hadid
- DISQUALIFIED: Claire
  - Claire was disqualified for breaking the rules and her win was rescinded. Although Brandon's print was announced to be put into print for Dixie cups, there was no replacement winner for the challenge and Batani was spared elimination.

=== Episode 9: A "Little" Avant Garde ===
Original airdate: October 12, 2017

The dramatic fallout from the cheating scandal rocks the designers and leaves everyone wondering how they’ll move forward in the competition. But the show must go on and the designers rally to create an Avant Garde look inspired by Shopkins characters.

- Challenge: Create an avant garde look inspired by Shopkins Shoppies.
- Judges: Heidi Klum, Nina Garcia, Zac Posen
- Guest Judge: Kate Upton
- WINNER: Michael
- ELIMINATED: Batani & Amy

=== Episode 10: Driving Miss Unconventional ===
Original airdate: October 19, 2017

It’s the Lexus Challenge, but this one is Unconventional and nobody is safe! The designers must use safety materials to create a look that wows the judges as Fashion Week is right around the corner.

- Challenge: Create a runway look using unconventional materials.
- Guest Judge: Carly Chaikin
- WINNER: Ayana
- ELIMINATED: Michael

=== Episode 11: Warrior Fashion ===
Original airdate: October 26, 2017

It’s an emotional Runway as the designers create looks inspired by “Warrior Women” — women who have battled breast cancer.

- Challenge: Create an editorial look inspired by Warrior Women.
- Judges: Heidi Klum, Nina Garcia, Zac Posen
- Guest Judge: Rachel Brosnahan
- WINNER: Brandon
- SAVED: Margarita

=== Episode 12: There's Snow Business like Sew Business ===
Original airdate: November 2, 2017

The runway is converted into a Winter Wonderland as the designers are tasked with creating a winter-themed look that will decide who goes to NY Fashion Week and who gets left out in the cold.

- Challenge: Create a high fashion winter look.
- Judges: Heidi Klum, Nina Garcia, Zac Posen
- Guest Judge: Katie Holmes
- ADVANCED TO FASHION WEEK: Kentaro, Brandon, Ayana, Margarita, & Kenya
- ELIMINATED: None

=== Episode 13: Finale Part 1 ===
Original airdate: November 9, 2017

After heading home to work on their Fashion Week collections, the five finalists are visited by Tim who is not impressed with everything they have created so far. The designers return to New York and present the judges with 2 pieces from their collection. With only four designers remaining for the second part of the finale, everything is on the line.

- Challenge: Present two pieces from your final collection.
- Judges: Heidi Klum, Nina Garcia, Zac Posen
- Guest Judge: None
- ADVANCED TO FASHION WEEK: Brandon, Ayana, Margarita, Kentaro
- ELIMINATED: Kenya

=== Episode 14: Finale Part 2 ===
Original airdate: November 16, 2017

Fashion week is finally here and the designers rush to put the final touches on their collections. Four designers will have their dream of showing at New York Fashion Week, but only one designer will reach the ultimate goal of being crowned the next Project Runway Winner!

- Challenge: Present a 10-piece final collection at New York Fashion Week.
- Judges: Heidi Klum, Nina Garcia, Zac Posen
- Guest Judge: Jessica Alba
- WINNER: Kentaro
- ELIMINATED: Ayana (2nd Place), Brandon (3rd Place), Margarita (4th Place)

=== Episode 15: Season 16 Reunion Special ===
Original airdate: November 30, 2017

The season 16 designers reunite with mentor Tim Gunn to discuss their Project Runway experience. They come ready to reminisce, share emotions, and get to the bottom of the cheating scandal that rocked the season. And some of our favorite models also swing by!
