= The Nude Vampire =

La vampire nue
- Directed by: Jean Rollin
- Screenplay by: Jean Rollin; Serge Moati
- Produced by: Jean Lavie
- Starring: Caroline Cartier; Olivier Rollin; Maurice Lemaitre; Bernard Musson
- Cinematography: Jean-Jacques Renon
- Edited by: Jean-Denis Bonan
- Music by: Yvon Gerault; François Tusques; Acanthus
- Production companies: Films A.B.C. (A.B.C. Films); fr:Tigon British Film Productions
- Distributed by: Les Distributeurs Associés
- Release date: 20 May 1970 (France)
- Running time: 85 minutes
- Country: France
- Language: French

La vampire nue (English: The Nude Vampire, lit. The Naked Vampire) is a 1970 French film directed by Jean Rollin. It concerns a suicide cult led by a mysterious man known as "The Master".

== Plot ==
In a strange laboratory, three men in weird masks take the blood of a naked young woman in a hood. Another woman in an orange négligée is wandering the streets and is followed by a group of people wearing animal heads. The woman comes across a man named Pierre who tries to help her, but the masked men corner them and shoot the woman; Pierre escapes unharmed. The masked men take the woman into a building, and Pierre follows. Guests then arrive for some sort of party, but Pierre can't get into the building. Another scene reveals his father is behind it.

Pierre gatecrashes the next party, and a woman commits suicide in front of the other guests when a man shows her picture up on a projector. The woman in the orange nightgown appears and drinks the woman's blood. Pierre's face then appears on the projector. The other guests turn on Pierre. He escapes and is stopped by a man in a white cape who tells him to go to his father's office, where more mysteries await him.

Pierre goes to his father's office and confronts him, who explains that the girl he saw is his protégée and an orphan. Pierre's father was a friend of her family. The girl has an unknown blood condition, and her wounds heal right away; she is also believed to be a goddess by certain fanatics. What the father is saying is that she is a vampire. People are working to find someone with the same condition so that they can find a cure. The hoods and masks hide human faces from her so that she does not know she is different. They are hiding her from a group of vampires.

The vampire in the white cape takes the woman and tells Pierre to protect her. A fight then occurs between the vampires and the humans, leading to a beach where the woman sees the sunlight for the first time. They explain that they are not vampires but mutants and that the human race will one day evolve and all have the power of immortality.

== Cast ==
- Caroline Cartier as Vampire, woman in an orange négligée (credited as Christine François)
- Olivier Rollin as Pierre Radamante (Jean Rollin's half-brother, credited as Olivier Martin)
- Maurice Lemaitre as Georges Radamante
- Bernard Musson as Voringe
- Jean Aron as Fredor
- Ursule Pauly as Solange
- Catherine Castel as Georges' Servant (credited as Cathy Tricot)
- Marie-Pierre Castel as Georges Servant (credited as Pony Tricot)
- Michel Delahaye as Grandmaster
- Ly Lestrong
- Pascal Fardoulis as Robert
- Paul Bisciglia as Butler
- René-Jean Chauffard

== Credits ==
- Sound editor: Michel Patient
- Art Direction: Jio Berk
- Masks: Jacques Courtois
- Poster designer: Philippe Druillet
- Photographer: Michel Maiofis
- Assistant director: Pierre Leblond
- Film processing: Laboratoires L.T.C Saint-Cloud
- Sound stages: Avia Films
- Filming locations:

- Paris
- Rochefort-en-Yvelines (Château Porgès)
- Hautot-sur-Mer (beach at Pourville-lès-Dieppe)

== Release ==
La Vampire Nue was distributed in France by Les Distributeurs Associés on 20 May 1970. It is available on Blu-ray from Kino and streaming on their Kino Cult platform. It was released on 4K and Blu-ray in the UK by Powerhouse Films on 22 April 2024 in a limited edition.

== Reception ==
In 1973, David McGillivray of the Monthly Film Bulletin reviewed a 79-minute dubbed version of the film. McGillivray described the film as a "disconcerting mixture of traditional horror and futuristic sci-fi effects-achieves at its best a quality that is more hallucinatory than erotic." McGillivray found that the set, costume designs and sequences at the baroque chateau have "a certain bizarre extravagance, but the essential thinness of the script is reinforced by Rollin's tendency to strive for a sustained mood of mystery by holding shots for several seconds after the action has been completed." McGillivray concluded that the "cumulative effect of these delays a deadendingly slow pace which appears more contrived than supernatural."

"It would be so easy to just write this off as garbage, an example of eurotrash not worth your time. There is a story here but it has been lazily cobbled together, with plotholes that are insulting rather than annoying. It defies even its own twisted internal logic which, trust me, is seriously difficult if you see how much leeway Rollin allows himself. Add to that a grating amateurism which keeps popping up in the oddest places, like with the wooden acting and the prop use" — Ard Vijn, January 2008

"...a mad fever dream as lysergic as you could hope...it takes place in a sort of alternative nocturnal world that resembles our own, but which is firmly rooted in dream-logic" — Jonathan Sisson, February 2017

"La Vampire Nue, as it was released in France, was the second feature film directed and written by artist Jean Rollin after Le Viol Du Vampire. Both films received poor reviews upon their original release but quickly grew into cult classics as audiences celebrated Rollin's intensely moody interpretations of a vampire-ruled society."

"One of Rollin's early, cruder efforts, this weird and sometimes wonderful film mixes bizarre fashions, clumsy action, beautiful locations, dream images, casual eroticism and, unusually, a strangely humane finale....Absurdly plotted, this is still somehow rather impressive, with a novel premise and leaving you somehow rooting for the vampires, no mean feat." — empireonline.com, 2000

"costume design is also striking, particularly the masked costumes and outfits worn by the Castel twins, in their Rollin film debut" — John Kirk, Blueprint: Review, 2024

"In the interest of truth in advertising, the movie should have been titled The Vampire in the See-through Nightie." — Gregory J. Smalley, February 2012, 366 Weird Movies, 2024
