= Marie-Pierre Castel =

French actress (1949–2013)

- Born: Marie-Pierre Yvonne Tricot; 5 February 1949; Villejuif, Val-de-Marne, France
- Died: 10 February 2013 (aged 64); Nîmes, France
- Other names: Pony Tricot; Pony Castel
- Occupation: Actress
- Years active: 1969–1977
- Known for: Requiem pour un Vampire
- Relatives: Catherine Castel (sister)

Marie-Pierre Yvonne Tricot (5 February 1949 – 10 February 2013), known professionally as Marie-Pierre Castel, or Pony Tricot, was a French actress. She became notable for her collaboration with Jean Rollin, appearing in a number of his films, including, La vampire nue (1970), Le frisson des vampires (1970), Requiem pour un vampire (1971), and Lèvres de sang (1975).

== Career ==
Castel started her career working in the beauty industry, as a barber, before deciding on acting as a career choice. She made her screen debut in 1970, when she was cast in Jean Rollin's La vampire nue, appearing alongside her twin sister, Catherine, in the first of several roles which she would appear with her sister. The sisters were credited under their own surname of Tricot for their debut roles, but were subsequently known under the pseudonym name of 'Castel', a surname of their relatives. This was followed by more collaborations with Rollin, including Le frisson des vampires, and, in her first leading role, Requiem pour un Vampire, which is perhaps her most notable performance. Both films were intended to feature Catherine, but when she fell pregnant, Rollin had to find new girls to pair Marie-Pierre with.

Castel would continue to appear in a number of Rollin's films, such as, the comedy, Tout le monde il en a deux, and one of his most successful works, Lèvres de sang, which starred Jean-Loup Philippe and Annie Belle. Castel accepted work in several of Rollin's pornographic films, when the director was facing financial difficulty at the time while trying to make up the budget for his intended projects, turning to the adult film industry as a viable option; featuring in Phantasmes, Douces pénétrations, Introductions and in her final collaboration with Rollin, Suce moi vampire, which was an extended pornographic version of Lèvres de sang, with the hardcore scenes shot and inserted into the film in 1976.

She has also worked with directors, Jean-Marie Pallardy and Bernard Launois. Her final acting appearance was in the 1977 Francis Girod film, René la canne, starring Gérard Depardieu, Sylvia Kristel and Michel Piccoli.

== Death ==
Castel died on 10 February 2013 in Nîmes, France, five days after her 64th birthday. The cause of her death was not specified.

== Filmography ==
Year	Title	English title	Role	Ref.
1970	La vampire nue	The Nude Vampire	Georges' servant	
1971	Le frisson des vampires	The Shiver of the Vampires	Servant	
1971	Requiem pour un vampire	Requiem for a Vampire	Marie	
1973	Le journal érotique d'un bûcheron (Note: Later hardcore insert.)	Erotic Diary		
1974	Tout le monde il en a deux	Fly Me the French Way	Une souris	
1975	Lèvres de sang	Lips of Blood	Jumelle vampire	
1975	Les dépravées du plaisir	The Depraved of Pleasure		
1975	Phantasmes	Once Upon a Virgin	La jumelle scout	
1976	Douces pénétrations	Sweet Penetrations	Une soubrette	
1976	Introductions	Weekends of a Perverted Couple	Twin	
1976	Suce-moi vampire (Note: Hardcore version of Lèvres de sang (Lips of Blood).)	Suck Me Vampire	Jumelle vampire	
1977	René la canne	Rene the Cane		
