= List of French erotic films =

This is a list of the most notable softcore erotic films and sex comedy films produced in France (including co-productions).

== List ==
Title	Director	Cast	Genre	Notes
1967
Belle de Jour	Luis Buñuel	Catherine Deneuve, Jean Sorel, Michel Piccoli	Drama	
1971
Good Little Girls (Les Petites Filles modèles)	Jean-Claude Roy	Marie-Georges Pascal, Michèle Girardon, Bella Darvi	Comedy	
Requiem pour un Vampire	Jean Rollin	Marie-Pierre Castel, Mireille Dargent, Philippe Gasté	Horror / Fantastic	
I Am a Nymphomaniac	Max Pécas	Sandra Julien, Janine Reynaud, Michel Lemoine	comedy / Fantasy	
Blanche	Walerian Borowczyk	Michel Simon, Ligia Branice, Georges Wilson	Drama / Historic	
1972
Last Tango in Paris	Bernardo Bertolucci	Marlon Brando, Maria Schneider, Jean-Pierre Léaud	Romantic / Drama	
1973
I Am Frigid... Why?	Max Pécas	Sandra Julien, Marie-Georges Pascal, Catherine Wagener	Drama	
Immoral Tales	Walerian Borowczyk	Paloma Picasso, Charlotte Alexandra, Fabrice Luchini	anthology	
Marianne's Temptations	Francis Leroi	Rosa Fumetto, Bob Asklöf, Bernard Tixier	Drama	
Bananes mécaniques	Jean-François Davy	Marie-Georges Pascal, Anne Libert, Pauline Larrieu	Comedy	
Don Juan, or If Don Juan Were a Woman	Roger Vadim	Brigitte Bardot, Robert Hossein, Jane Birkin	Drama	
Female Vampire (La Comtesse noire)	Jesús Franco	Lina Romay, Jack Taylor, Monica Swinn	Horror / Fantastic	
1974
Going Places (Les Valseuses)	Bertrand Blier	Gérard Depardieu, Patrick Dewaere, Miou-Miou	Comedy / Drama	
Les Démoniaques	Jean Rollin	Joëlle Coeur, Willy Braque, Mireille Dargent	Horror / Fantastic	
Hot and Naked	Guy Maria	Marie-Georges Pascal, Bob Asklöf, Jean-Michel Dhermay	Action / Drama	
Emmanuelle	Just Jaeckin	Sylvia Kristel, Alain Cuny, Christine Boisson	Romantic	
1975
La Bête	Walerian Borowczyk	Sirpa Lane, Lisbeth Hummel, Marcel Dalio	Comedy / Horror / Drama	
Emmanuelle 2	Francis Giacobetti	Sylvia Kristel, Laura Gemser, Umberto Orsini	Romantic	
Maîtresse	Barbet Schroeder	Bulle Ogier, Gérard Depardieu, André Rouyer	Comedy	
Story of O (Histoire d’O)	Just Jaeckin	Corinne Cléry, Udo Kier, Anthony Steel	Drama	
1976
Spermula	Charles Matton	Udo Kier, Dayle Haddon, Karin Petersen	fantasy	
1977
Bilitis	David Hamilton	Patti D'Arbanville, Bernard Giraudeau, Mathieu Carrière	Romantic / Drama	
1978
Goodbye Emmanuelle	François Leterrier	Sylvia Kristel, Olga Georges-Picot, Umberto Orsini	Romantic	
1979
Fascination	Jean Rollin	Brigitte Lahaie Franka Mai, Jean-Pierre Lemaire	Fantastic	
Laura	David Hamilton	Maud Adams Dawn Dunlap, James Mitchell	Romantic	
1980
Tendres Cousines	David Hamilton	Thierry Tevini Anja Schüte, Valérie Dumas	Romantic	
1981
A Summer in St. Tropez	David Hamilton	Anne, Monica Broeke, Catherine	Romantic / Drama	
Beau-père	Bertrand Blier	Patrick Dewaere, Ariel Besse	Melodrama / Drama	
1984
Premiers désirs	David Hamilton	Monica Broeke, Patrick Bauchau, Emmanuelle Béart	Romantic	
Emmanuelle 4	Francis Leroi, Iris Letans	Mia Nygren, Sylvia Kristel, Dominique Troyes	Romantic / Drama	
1987
Emmanuelle 5	Walerian Borowczyk	Monique Gabrielle, Crofton Hardester, Dana Burns Westburg	Romantic / Drama	
1992
The Lover (film)	Jean-Jacques Annaud	Jane March	Romantic / Drama	
2006
Lady Chatterley	Pascale Ferran	Marina Hands, Jean‑Louis Coulloc'h	Drama	
2013
Blue Is the Warmest Colour	Abdellatif Kechiche	Léa Seydoux, Adèle Exarchopoulos	Romantic / Drama	
Young & Beautiful (Jeune et jolie)	François Ozon		Action / Drama / Romance	

== Sources ==
- Dictionnaire des films français pornographiques et érotiques en 16 et 35 mm, Serious Publishing 2011, directed by Christophe Bier
- The 2 Unforgettable French Erotic Movies – Old and New
