= List of French films of 1971 =

This is a list of films produced in France in 1971.

== Films ==
Title	Director	Cast	Genre	Notes
Un aller simple	José Giovanni	Jean-Claude Bouillon, Nicole Fernande Grisoni, Maurice Garrel		French-Italian-Spanish co-production
Les Assassins de l'ordre	Marcel Carné	Jacques Brel, Catherine Rouvel, Charles Denner		French-Italian co-production
Les Aveux les plus doux	Édouard Molinaro	Philippe Noiret, Roger Hanin, Caroline Cellier	Crime	French-Algerian-Italian co-production
The Boat on the Grass	Gérard Brach	Claude Jade, Jean-Pierre Cassel, John McEnery	Drama	
Bonaparte et la Revolution	Abel Gance	Albert Dieudonné, Antonin Artaud, Edmond van Daele	Historical film	
The Burglars	Henri Verneuil	Jean-Paul Belmondo, Omar Sharif, Dyan Cannon	Crime	
The Cat o' Nine Tails	Dario Argento	Carlo Alighiero, Catherine Spaak, Rada Rassimov	Thriller	Italian-West German-French co-production
Le Chat	Pierre Granier-Deferre	Jean Gabin, Simone Signoret	Drama	French-Italian co-production
Comptes à rebours	Roger Pigaut	Michel Bouquet, Serge Reggiani, Jeanne Moreau	Polar	French-Italian co-production
Daughters of Darkness	Harry Kümel	Delphine Seyrig, Daniele Ouimet, John Karlen		Belgian-French-West German co-production
The Deadly Trap	René Clément	Faye Dunaway, Frank Langella, Barbara Parkins		
Death in Venice	Luchino Visconti	Dirk Bogarde, Bjorn Andresen, Silvana Mangano	Drama	Italian-French co-production
La Débauche	Jean-François Davy	Philippe Gasté, Karine Jeantet, Denyse Roland		
The Decameron	Pier Paolo Pasolini	Wolfgang Hillinger, Vittorio Fanfoni, Patrizia de Clara	Comedy	Italian-French-West German co-production
Don't Deliver Us from Evil	Joël Séria	Jeanne Goupil, Bernard Dheran, Henri Poirier	Crime, drama	
Easy, Down There!	Jacques Deray	Alain Delon, Nathalie Delon, Paul Meurisse		French-Italian co-production
Four Flies on Grey Velvet	Dario Argento	Mimsy Farmer, Tom Felleghy, Francine Racette	Crime, mystery, thriller	Italian-French co-production
Four Nights of a Dreamer	Robert Bresson	Guillaume des Forets, Isabelle Weingarten, Maurice Monnoyer	Drama, romance	French-Italian co-production
Girl Slaves of Morgana Le Fay	Bruno Gantillon	Michele Perello, Doninique Delpierre, Alfred Baillou		
Good Little Girls	Jean-Claude Roy	Marie-Georges Pascal, Michèle Girardon, Jessica Dorn		
I Am a Nymphomaniac	Max Pécas	Sandra Julien, Janine Reynaud, Yves Vincent	Comedy, fantasy	
The Iguana with the Tongue of Fire	Riccardo Freda	Luigi Pistilli, Dagmar Lassander, Anton Diffring	Giallo	Italian-French-West German co-production
Just Before Nightfall	Claude Chabrol	Stéphane Audran, Michel Bouquet, François Périer	Drama	French-Italian co-production
The Legend of Frenchie King	Christian-Jaque, Guy Casaril	Brigitte Bardot, Claudia Cardinale, Michael J. Pollard	Western	French-Italian-Spanish-British co-production
Love Hate	Jean-Pierre Mocky	Jean-Pierre Mocky, Marion Game, Paul Müller	Thriller	
La Part des lions	Jean Larriaga	Robert Hossein, Charles Aznavour, Michel Constantin	Crime	French-Italian co-production
Le saut de l'ange	Yves Boisset	Jean Yanne, Senta Berger, Sterling Hayden		French-Italian co-production
Macédoine	Jacques Scandelari	Michèle Mercier, Bernard Fresson, Robert Webber	Comedy	French-Italian co-production
The Married Couple of the Year Two	Jean-Paul Rappeneau	Jean-Paul Belmondo, Marlène Jobert, Laura Antonelli	Adventure	French-Italian-Romanian co-production
Max et les Ferrailleurs	Claude Sautet	Michel Piccoli, Romy Shcneider, Bernard Fresson	Crime	French-Italian co-production
Murmur of the Heart	Louis Malle	Lea Massari, Daniel Gélin, Michel Lonsdale	Comedy	French-Italian-West German co-production
Out 1	Jacques Rivette	Jean-Pierre Léaud, Juliet Berto	Comedy drama	
Le Prussien	Jean L'Hôte			
Popsy Pop	Jean Herman	Claudia Cardinale, Stanley Barker, Henri Charrière		French-Italian co-production
Raphael, or The Debauched One	Michel Deville	Philippe Moreau, Maurice Barrier, Maurice Barriern	Drama	
Red Sun	Terence Young	Charles Bronson, Ursula Andress, Toshiro Mifune	Western	French-Italian-Spanish co-production
Rendezvous at Bray	André Delvaux	Anna Karina, Mathieu Carrière, Roger Van Hool	Avant-garde, drama	Belgian-France co-production
Requiem for a Vampire	Jean Rollin	Paul Bisciglia, Michel Delesalle, Antoine Mosin	Horror	
Return of Sabata	Gianfranco Parolini	Lee Van Cleef, Reiner Schöne, Giamppiero Albertini	Western	Italian-French-German co-production
La Saignée	Claude Mulot	Bruno Pradal, Charles Southwood, Gabriele Tinti	Polar	French-Italian co-production
The Shiver of the Vampires	Jean Rollin	Sandra Julien, Jean-Marie Durand, Jacques Robiolles		
Someone Behind the Door	Nicolas Gessner	Charles Bronson, Anthony Perkins, Jill Ireland	Thriller	French-Italian co-production
The Sorrow and the Pity	Marcel Ophüls		Documentary	
Touch and Go	Philippe de Broca	Marlène Jobert, Michel Piccoli, Michael York		French-Italian co-production
Trafic	Jacques Tati	Jacques Tati, Maria Kimber, Marcel Fravel	Comedy	
Two English Girls	François Truffaut	Jean-Pierre Léaud, Kika Markham, Stacey Tendeter	Drama, romance	
Les Vieux loups bénissent la mort	Pierre Kaflon	Jess Morgane, Victor Guyau, Jean Valmont		
Web of the Spider	Antonio Margheriti	Anthony Franciosa, Michèle Mercier, Klaus Kinski	Horror	Italian-French-West German co-production
Without Apparent Motive	Philippe Labro	Jean-Louis Trintignant, Dominique Sanda, Sacha Distel		French-Italian co-production

== See also ==
- 1971 in France

== Notes ==
=== Sources ===
- Buening, Michael. "Quattro Mosche di Velluto Grigio". AllMovie. Archived from the original on July 30, 2012.
- Erickson, Hal. "Le Chat". AllMovie. Archived from the original on February 28, 2012.
- Erickson, Hal. "Death in Venice". AllMovie. Archived from the original on August 5, 2012.
- Curti, Roberto (2017). Riccardo Freda: The Life and Works of a Born Filmmaker. McFarland & Company. ISBN 978-1476628387.
- Curti, Roberto (2017). Italian Gothic Horror Films, 1970–1979. McFarland & Company. ISBN 978-1476629605.
- Curti, Roberto; Lafond, Frank (2026). French Thrillers of the 1970s: Volume I, Crime Films. Jefferson, North Carolina: McFarland & Company. ISBN 978-1-4766-8681-3. LCCN 2025048366.
- Firsching, Robert. "The Cat o' Nine Tails". AllMovie. Archived from the original on August 1, 2012.
- Fountain, Clarke. "Someone Behind the Door". AllMovie. Archived from the original on March 25, 2012.
- German, Yurid. "Quatre Nuits d'un Rêveur". AllMovie. Archived from the original on June 8, 2016.
- Grant, Kevin (2011). Any Gun Can Play. Fab Press. ISBN 9781903254615.
- Wiener, Tom. "Two English Girls". AllMovie. Archived from the original on March 13, 2013.
