= List of French films of 1973 =

A list of films produced in France in 1973.

== Films ==
Title	Director	Cast	Genre	Notes
A Full Day's Work	Jean-Louis Trintignant	Jacques Dufilho, Luce Marquand	Comedy	
L'Affaire Crazy Capo	Patrick Jamain	Maurice Ronet, Jean-Pierre Marielle, Jean Servais		French-Italian co-production
Los amantes de la isla del Diablo	Jesús Franco	Andres Resino, Genevieve Deloir, Dennis Price	Women-in-prison film	Spanish-French co-production
Amarcord	Federico Fellini	Bruno Zanin, Magali Noël, Pupella Maggio	Drama	Italian-French co-production
Anita: Swedish Nymphet	Torgny Wickman	Christina Lindberg, Stellan Skarsgård	Adult	Swedish-French co-production
Baba Yaga	Corrado Farina	Carroll Baker, Isabelle De Funès, George Eastman		Italian-French co-production
Bananes mécaniques	Jean-François Davy	Marie-Georges Pascal, Elisabeth Drancourt, Anne Libert	Sex comedy	French-West German co-production
Brothers Blue	Luigi Bazzoni	Guido Mannari, Tina Aumont, Jack Palance	Western	Italian-French co-production
The Burned Barns	Jean Chapot	Simone Signoret, Alain Delon, Paul Crauchet		
Can Dialectics Break Bricks?	René Viénet			
Un capitan de quince aňos	Jesús Franco	José Manuel Marcos, Edmund Purdom, William Berger	Adventure	Spanish-French co-production
Chino	John Sturges, Diulio Coletti	Charles Bronson, Marcel Bozzuffi, Jill Ireland		Italian-Spanish-French co-production
Le complot	René Gainville	Michel Bouquet, Michel Duchaussoy, Raymond Pellegrin		French-Spanish-Italian co-production
Day for Night	François Truffaut	Jacqueline Bisset, Valentina Cortese, François Truffaut		French-Italian co-production
The Day of the Jackal	Fred Zinnemann	Edward Fox, Michel Lonsdale, Alan Badel	Thriller	French-British co-production
Défense de savoir	Nadine Trintignant	Jean-Louis Trintignant, Michel Bouquet, Charles Denner		French-Italian co-production
The Demons	Jesús Franco	Anne Libert, Britt Nichols, Alberto Dalbés	Horror	Spanish-French-Portuguese co-production
La dernière bourrée à Paris	Raoul André	Francis Blanche, Roger Coggio, Annie Cordy	Comedy	
Le Dingue	Daniel Daërt	Michel Creton, Catherine Daërt, Christian Baltauss		
Dirty Weekend	Dino Risi	Marcello Mastroianni, Oliver Reed, Carole André		Italian-French co-production
The Dominici Affair	Claude Bernard-Aubert	Jean Gabin, Victor Lanoux, Paul Crauchet	Crime	French-Italian co-production
Don Juan, or If Don Juan Were a Woman	Roger Vadim	Brigitte Bardot, Maurice Ronet, Mathieu Carrière	Drama	French-Italian co-production
Les Ébranlées	Jesús Franco	Anne Libert, Doris Thomas, Howard Vernon	Drama	
L'emmerdeur	Édouard Molinaro	Lino Ventura, Jacques Brel, Caroline Cellier	Comedy	French-Italian co-production
The Erotic Rites of Frankenstein	Jesús Franco	Alberto Dalbés, Dennis Price, Howard Vernon	Horror	Spanish-French co-production
Escape to Nowhere	Claude Pinoteau	Lino Ventura, Leo Genn, Suzanne Flon, Robert Hardy, Lea Massari	Spy film, thriller	French-Italian-British co-production
Fantastic Planet	René Laloux		Science fiction	French-Czechoslovak co-production
Le Fils	Pierre Grannier-Deferre	Yves Montand, Lea Massari, Marcel Bozzuffi		French-Italian co-production
Flatfoot	Steno	Bud Spencer, Adalberto Maria Merli, Raymond Pellegrin		Italian-French co-production
Flesh for Frankenstein	Paul Morrissey	Joe Dallesandro, Udo Kier, Monique van Vooren	Horror	Italian-French co-production
Forbidden Priests	Denys de La Patellière	Robert Hossein, Claude Jade	Drama	
Les Gants blancs du diable	László Szabó	Bernadette Lafont, Jean-Pierre Kalfon, Yves Afonso		
La Grande Bouffe	Marco Ferreri	Marcello Mastroianni, Michel Piccoli, Ugo Tognazzi	Comedy drama	French-Italian co-production
Happy New Year	Claude Lelouch	Lino Ventura, Francoise Fabian, Charles Gérard	Crime	French-Italian co-production
Here We Go Again, Eh Providence?	Alberto De Martino	Tomas Milian, Gregg Palmer, Carole Andre	Western	Italian-Spanish-French co-production
Home Sweet Home	Benoît Lamy	Claude Jade, Jacques Perrin, Ann Petersen	Drama	French-Belgian co-production
The Hostages	Édouard Molinaro	Daniel Cauchy, Bulle Ogier, Gilles Ségal		French-Italian co-production
Il n'y a pas de fumée sans feu	André Cayatte	Annie Girardot, Bernard Fresson, Michel Bouquet	Thriller	French-Italian co-production
Immoral Tales	Walerian Borowczyk	Lise Danvers, Paloma Picasso, Fabrice Luchini		
The Iron Rose	Jean Rollin	Françoise Pascal, Hugues Quester, Nathalie Perrey	Horror	
L'Insolent	Jean-Claude Roy	Henry Silva, Andre Pousse, Philippe Clay		
Killing in the Sun	Daniel Vigne	Michel Constantin, Marcel Bozzuffi, Nicole Calfan	Crime	French-Italian co-production
Lucky Luciano	Francesco Rosi	Gian Maria Volonté, Rod Steiger, Edmond O'Brien	Crime	Italian-French co-production
The Mad Adventures of Rabbi Jacob	Gérard Oury	Louis de Funès, Marcel Dalio, Claude Giraud	Comedy	French-Italian co-production
Le Magnifique	Philippe de Broca	Jean-Paul Belmondo, Jacqueline Bisset, Vittorio Caprioli	Comedy	French-Italian co-production
Massacre in Rome	George Pan Cosmatos	Richard Burton, Marcello Mastroianni, Leo McKern	War	Italian-French co-production
Le mataf	Serge Leroy	Michel Constantin, Adolfo Celi, Georges Geret		French-Italian co-production
Mean Frank and Crazy Tony	Michele Lupo	Lee Van Cleef, Tony Lo Bianco, Edwige Fenech		Italian-French co-production
The Mother and the Whore	Jean Eustache	Jean-Pierre Léaud, Françoise Lebrun, Bernadette Lafont	Drama	
My Name Is Nobody	Tonino Valerii	Terence Hill, Henry Fonda, Jean Martin		Italian-French-West German co-production
Night Flight from Moscow	Henri Verneuil	Yul Brynner, Henry Fonda, Dirk Bogarde	Spy film	French-Italian-West German co-production
Now Where Did the 7th Company Get to?	Robert Lamoureux	Jean Lefebvre, Pierre Mondy, Aldo Maccione	Comedy	French-Italian co-production
The Nun and the Devil	Domenico Paolella	Claudia Gravy, Muriel Catala, Anne Heywood	Drama	Italian-French co-production
Oh, If Only My Monk Would Want	Claude Pierson	Jean-Marie Proslier, Gilles Latulippe, Marcel Sabourin	Sex comedy	French-Canadian coproduction
Papillon	Franklin J. Schaffner	Steve McQueen, Dustin Hoffman	—N/a	American-French co-production
The Pelican	Gérard Blain	Gérard Blain, Dominique Ravix, Daniel Sarky	Drama	
A Police Officer Without Importance	Jean Larriaga	Marc Porel, Robert Hossein, Julien Negulesco	Crime	
A Rare Bird	Jean-Claude Brialy	Barbara, Pierre Bertin, Anny Duperey	Comedy	
Revolver	Sergio Sollima	Oliver Reed, Fabio Testi, Paola Pitagora	Crime	Italian-French-West German co-production
Salut, voleurs!	Frank Cassenti	Jacques Higelin, László Szabó, Anout Ferjac		
Seven Deaths in the Cat's Eye	Antonio Margheriti	Jane Birkin, Hiram Keller, Venantino Venantini		Italian-West German-French co-production
Sinner: The Secret Diary of a Nymphomaniac	Jesús Franco	Howard Vernon, Doris Thomas, Anne Libert	Drama	
The Society of the Spectacle	Guy Debord		Experimental documentary	
Le Solitaire	Alain Brunet	Hardy Kruger, Raymond Pellegrin, Georges Geret		French-West German co-production
Themroc	Claude Faraldo	Michel Piccoli, Béatrice Romand, Jeanne Herviale	Comedy	French-Italian co-production
Tony Arzenta	Duccio Tessari	Alain Delon, Richard Conte, Carla Gravina	—N/a	Italian-French co-production
Two Men Against the Law	José Giovanni	Jean Gabin, Alain Delon, Michel Bouquet	Drama	French-Italian co-production
Vivre ensemble	Anna Karina	Anna Karina, Michel Lancelot, Viviane Blassel	Drama	
Les Volets clos	Jean-Claude Brialy	Marie Bell, Jacques Charrier, Catherine Rouvel		
Les Voraces	Sergio Gobbi	Helmut Berger, Francoise Fabian, Paul Meurisse	Crime	French-Italian co-production
Wedding in Blood	Claude Chabrol	Stéphane Audran, Michel Piccoli, Claude Piéplu	Crime	French-Italian co-production
White Fang	Lucio Fulci	Franco Nero, Virna Lisi, Fernando Rey	Western	Italian-Spanish-French co-production
Without Warning	Bruno Gantillon	Maurie Ronet, Mario Adorf, Bruno Cremer		French-Italian co-production

== See also ==
- 1973 in France
- 1973 in French television
