= List of French films of 1978 =

A list of films produced in France in 1978.

== Films ==
Title	Director	Cast	Genre	Notes
L'amour en question	Andre Cayatte	Annie Girardot, Bibi Andersson	Crime	
L'Argent des autres	Christian de Chalonge	Jean-Louis Trintignant, Claude Brasseur, Michel Serrault	Drama	
Blood Relatives	Claude Chabrol	Donald Sutherland, Aude Landry, Lisa Langlois	—N/a	French-Canadian co-production
Les Bronzés	Patrice Leconte	Josiane Balasko, Michel Blanc, Gérard Jugnot	Comedy	
Bye Bye Monkey	Marco Ferreri	Gérard Depardieu, Marcello Mastroianni, James Coco	Comedy drama	Italian–French co-production
La Cage aux Folles	Édouard Molinaro	Ugo Tognazzi, Michel Serrault, Michel Galabru	Comedy	French–Italian co-production
Dossier 51	Michel Deville	François Marthouret, Daniel Mesguich, Philippe Rouleau	Thriller	
Empire of Passion	Nagisa Oshima	Kazuko Yoshiyuki, Tatsuya Fuji, Takahiro Tamura	Drama	Japanese-French co-production
Enfantasme	Sergio Gobbi	Agostina Belli, Stefano Satta Flores	—N/a	Italian–French co-production
Fedora	Billy Wilder	Marthe Keller, William Holden, Hildegard Knef		West German–French co-production
Fire's Share	Étienne Périer	Michel Piccoli, Claudia Cardinale, Jacques Perrin	—N/a	
Get Out Your Handkerchiefs	Bertrand Blier	Gérard Depardieu, Patrick Dewaere, Carole Laure	Comedy	Belgian–French co-production
The Green Room	François Truffaut	Jean Dasté, François Truffaut, Nathalie Baye	Drama	
The Guardian Angel	Jacques Fournier	Margaret Trudeau, André Falcon, Francis Lemaire	Romantic comedy	
Je suis timide... mais je me soigne	Pierre Richard	Pierre Richard, Aldo Maccione, Mimi Coutelier	—N/a	
The Last Tasmanian	Tom Haydon	Leo McKern, Jim Allen, Rhys Jones	Documentary, drama, history	Australian-French co-production
Little Girl in Blue Velvet	Alan Bridges	Michel Piccoli, Claudia Cardinale, Lara Wendel	—N/a	
One Page of Love	Maurice Rabinowicz	Ève Bonfanti, Adrian Brine	—N/a	Ắ
Un papillon sur l'épaule	Jacques Deray	Lino Ventura, Nicole Garcia, Claudine Auger	Thriller	
The Pawn	Christian Gion	Henri Guybet, Claude Jade, Maureen Kerwin	Comedy	
Perceval le Gallois	Éric Rohmer	Fabrice Luchini, André Dussolier, Arielle Dombasle	Drama	French–Italian-West German co-production
Les petits câlins	Jean-Marie Poiré		—N/a	
Les Raisins de la Mort	Jean Rollin	Marie-Georges Pascal, Serge Marquand, Felix Marten	Horror	
Les Rendez-vous d'Anna	Chantal Akerman	Aurore Clément, Helmut Griem, Magali Noël	Drama	West German–Belgian–French co-production
The Medusa Touch	Jack Gold	Richard Burton, Lino Ventura, Lee Remick	Thriller	French–British co-production
Second Wind	Gérard Blain	Robert Stack, Anicée Alvina	Drama	
A Simple Story	Claude Sautet	Romy Schneider, Bruno Cremer, Claude Brasseur	Drama	
Surprise Sock	Jean-François Davy	Bernadette Lafont, Rufus, Anna Karina	Comedy	
The Suspended Vocation	Raúl Ruiz			
Le Témoin	Jean-Pierre Mocky	Alberto Sordi, Philippe Noiret, Roland Dubillard		French-Italian co-production
Victims of Vice	Jacques Scandelari	Marie-Georges Pascal, Patrice Valota, Philippe Castelli	Crime	
Violette Nozière	Claude Chabrol	Isabelle Huppert, Jean Carmet, Stéphane Audran	Drama	
Who Is Killing the Great Chefs of Europe?	Ted Kotcheff	George Segal, Jacqueline Bisset, Robert Morley	Comedy	
La Zizanie	Claude Zidi	Louis de Funès, Annie Girardot, Maurice Risch	Comedy	

== See also ==
- 1978 in France
- 1978 in French television
