= François About =

French film director and photographer (1939–2026)

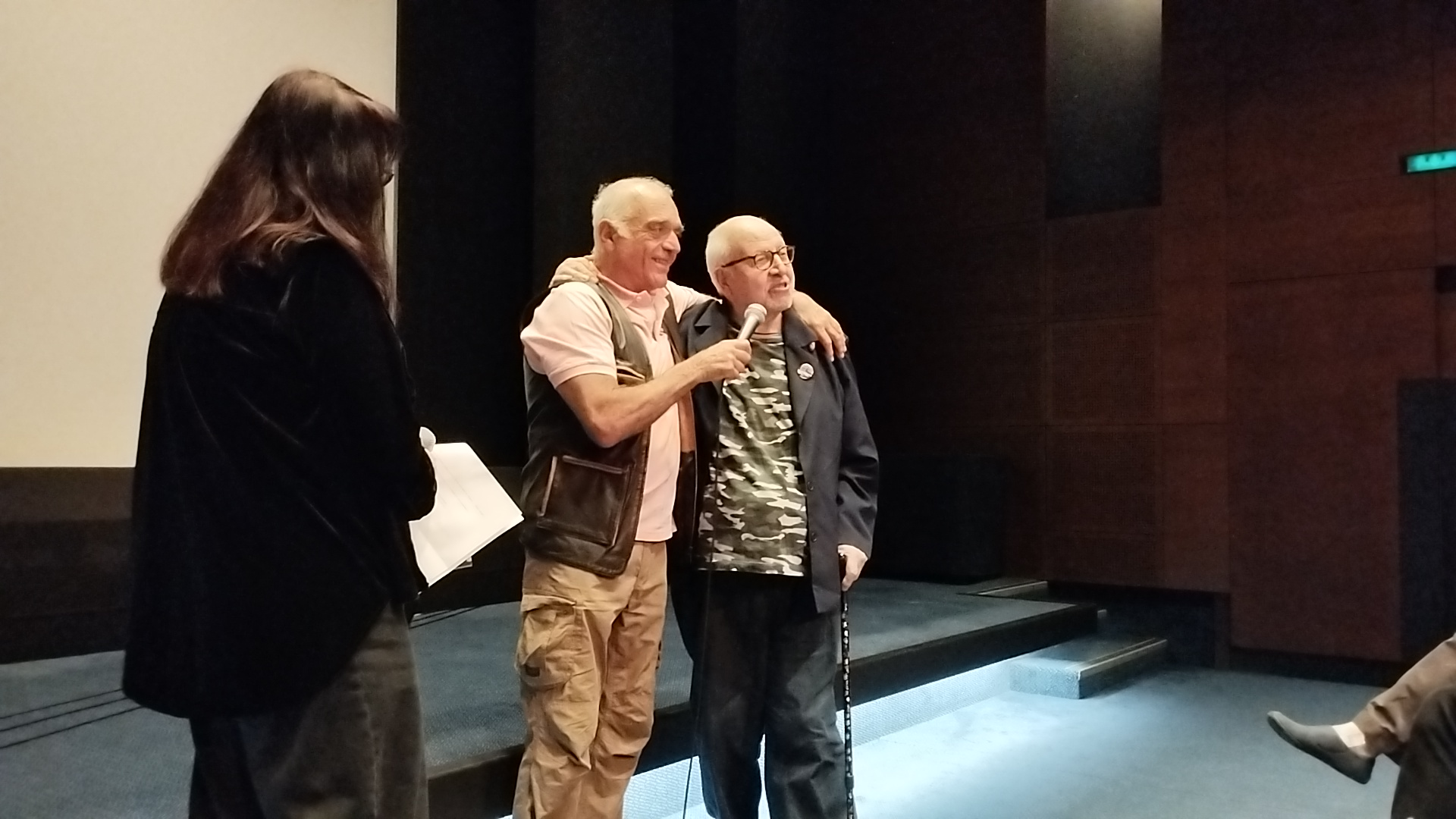
- About (right) in 2023
- Born: 1 September 1939; Nancy, France
- Died: 7 July 2026 (aged 86)
- Education: École nationale supérieure Louis-Lumière
- Occupations: Film director Photographer

François About (French: [fʁɑ̃swˈa ɐbˈa͡ʊt]; 1 September 1939 – 7 July 2026) was a French film director and photographer.

A graduate of the École nationale supérieure Louis-Lumière, he worked closely with Jacques Scandelari.

About died on 7 July 2026, at the age of 86.

== Filmography ==
=== As photography director ===
- New York City Inferno (1978)
- Victims of Vice (1978)
- Emmanuelle 7 (1993)

=== As film director ===
- Éric à New York (1980)
- Un Arabe à New York (1981)
- À la recherche de Douglas (1982)
- Virginia (1990)
- La Fièvre de Laure (1996)
- Fantasmes en été (2000)
- Entre femmes (2000)
- Pulsions sauvages (2001)
- Désir fatal (2001)
