= Michel Charrel =

French actor (1936–2026)

- Born: 13 September 1936; Tarare, France
- Died: 14 February 2026 (aged 89)
- Education: Institut des hautes études cinématographiques (Bac)
- Occupation: Actor

Michel Charrel (French: [miʃˈɛl ʃaʁˈɛl]; 13 September 1936 – 14 February 2026) was a French actor.

After growing up in a family of grocery store owners, he earned his Baccalauréat from the Institut des hautes études cinématographiques. He received his first large roles in the 1960s and expanded his career in the 70s.

Charrel died on 14 February 2026, at the age of 89.

== Filmography ==
- Fort du Fou (1963)
- Landru (1963)
- The World's Most Beautiful Swindlers (1964)
- Coplan Takes Risks (1964)
- The Train (1964)
- Fantômas (1964)
- Le Tigre aime la chair fraiche (1964)
- The Vampire of Düsseldorf (1965)
- Un mari à prix fixe (1965)
- Le Chant du monde (1965)
- Three Rooms in Manhattan (1965)
- The Wise Guys (1965)
- The Gardener of Argenteuil (1966)
- An Idiot in Paris (1967)
- Belle de Jour (1967)
- Dead Run (1967)
- Les risques du métier (1967)
- Pasha (1968)
- Love in the Night (1968)
- Leontine (1968)
- The Black Hand (1968)
- Goto, Island of Love (1969)
- The Unfaithful Wife (1969)
- This Man Must Die (1969)
- A Golden Widow (1969)
- Last Known Address (1970)
- The Blood Rose (1970)
- L'homme orchestre (1970)
- Children of Mata Hari (1970)
- Last Leap (1970)
- Murmur of the Heart (1971)
- The Deadly Trap (1971)
- Les Bidasses en folie (1971)
- The Monk (1972)
- Bananes mécaniques (1973)
- Chinese in Paris (1974)
- Serious as Pleasure (1975)
- Flic Story (1975)
- Incorrigible (1975)
- Frauengefängnis (1975)
- The Good and the Bad (1976)
- Surprise Sock (1978)
- Gandahar (1987)
- Le Brasier (1991)
- Regular Lovers (2005)
- Irreplaceable (2016)
- De plus belle (2017)
- The Salt of Tears (2020)

== Publications ==
- L'Album (2003)
- Jesus l'asiatique (2004)
- Femme musulmane, séropositive (2005)
- Le hameau du Rossignol (2008)
