= French erotic film =

French erotic film can refer to:

- "French Erotic Film", an animutation featuring the song "Opblaaskrokodil" by Ome Henk
- Softcore pornography produced in France
  - Emmanuelle, a fictional character who has come to symbolize French erotic film
  - List of French erotic films
