= The Edifying and Joyous Story of Colinot =

The motivating and Joyous Story of Colinot
- Italian poster
- Directed by: Nina Companéez
- Written by: Nina Companéez
- Produced by: Mag Bodard
- Starring: Francis Huster; Nathalie Delon; Brigitte Bardot; Bernadette Lafont
- Cinematography: Ghislain Cloquet
- Edited by: Raymonde Guyot
- Music by: Guy Bontempelli
- Distributed by: Warner Bros.
- Release dates: 25 October 1973 (France); 17 May 1974 (Italy)
- Running time: 105 minutes
- Country: France
- Language: French
- Box office: 913,333 admissions (France)

The Edifying and Joyous Story of Colinot (French: L'histoire très bonne et très joyeuse de Colinot Trousse-Chemise) is a 1973 French comedy film directed and written by Nina Companéez. Francis Huster stars as the title character, Colinot. It was the final film appearance of Brigitte Bardot who retired from the entertainment industry when the film went into post-production.

== Plot ==
Colinot's (Huster) world is turned upside down when his fiancee is kidnapped. This leads him to dangerous chase around 15th century France only to find that she has found love in the arms of a nobleman. His fortunes take a turn when he meets Arabelle (Bardot) who teaches him many life lessons.

== Cast ==
- Francis Huster as Colinot
- Brigitte Bardot as Arabelle
- Nathalie Delon as Bertrade
- Ottavia Piccolo as Bergamotte
- Francis Blanche as vagrant
- Bernadette Lafont as Rosemonde
- Alice Sapritch as Dame Blanche
- Muriel Catala as Blandine
- Jean-Claude Drouot as Masnil Plassac
- Julien Guiomar as Rosemonde's husband
- Jean Le Poulain as Brother Albaret
- Paul Müller as Brother Hugo
- Rufus as Gagnepain
- Henri Tisot as Tournebeuf
- Évelyne Buyle as The paid companion
- Guy Grosso as Lucas
- Catherine Lachens
- Marie-Georges Pascal
- Maurice Barrier
- Mike Marshall
