= Le Plumard en folie =

1974 film by Georges Combret

- Directed by: Jacques Lemoine; Georges Combret
- Written by: Rita Krauss; Jacques Lemoine; Robert Thomas
- Produced by: Georges Combret; Pierre David; Paul Laffargue
- Starring: Alice Sapritch; Michel Galabru; Jacques Préboist
- Cinematography: Raymond Lemoigne
- Edited by: Claude Guérin
- Music by: Charles Dumont
- Distributed by: Impex Films; Europrodis
- Release date: 3 April 1974
- Running time: 87 minutes
- Countries: Canada; France
- Language: French

Le Plumard en folie (meaning "the crazy feather bed") (or Le Lit... Ze Bawdy Bed ) is a 1974 Canadian-French comedy film directed by Jacques Lemoine and Georges Combret and starring Alice Sapritch, Michel Galabru and Jacques Préboist.

== Cast ==
- Alice Sapritch as La vieille blonde
- Michel Galabru as Charles
- Jacques Préboist as Jacky, le livreur
- Paul Préboist as Paul, le livreur
- Jean Lefebvre as Adrien
- Anna Gaël as Sylviane, la femme de chambre
- Robert Castel as M. Albert, le directeur de l'hôtel
- Christian Duvaleix as L'évadé 1
- Henri Tisot as L'amateur de parties fines
- Claude Gensac as Adrienne
- Denise Filiatrault as Fabienne
- Claude Michaud as Oscar, le garçon d'étage
- Willie Lamothe as L'évadé 2
- Anne Libert as Mademoiselle Prudent
- Patrick Topaloff as Monsieur Loyal
- Vincent Gauthier as Le gigolo
- Jacqueline Laurent
- Roger Carel as The voice of the bed

== Bibliography ==
- Gerald Pratley. A Century of Canadian Cinema. Lynx Images, 2003.
