= Tony Arzenta =

1973 film directed by Duccio Tessari

- Italian film poster
- Directed by: Duccio Tessari
- Screenplay by: Ugo Liberauce; Franco Verucci; Roberto Gandus
- Story by: Franco Verucci
- Produced by: Luciano Martino; Alain Delon; Raymond Danon
- Starring: Alain Delon; Richard Conte; Carla Gravina; Marc Porel; Giancarlo Sbragia; Umberto Orsini
- Cinematography: Silvano Ippoliti
- Edited by: Mario Morra
- Music by: Gianni Ferrio
- Production companies: Mondial Te.Fe; Adel Productions
- Distributed by: Titanus (Italy); Gaumont Distribution (France)
- Release dates: 23 August 1973 (France); 7 September 1973 (Italy)
- Running time: 113 minutes
- Countries: Italy; France
- Box office: ₤1.946 billion (Italy); 866,746 admissions (France)

Tony Arzenta (Note: Billed on-screen as Tony Arzenta - Big Guns) (also released internationally as No Way Out) is a 1973 poliziottesco film directed by Duccio Tessari. It stars Alain Delon (who also co-produced), Richard Conte, Carla Gravina, Marc Porel, Giancarlo Sbragia, and Umberto Orsini. Delon plays a mob hitman seeking vengeance against his former employers, after they kill his family. This Italian and French co-production was released on 23 August 1973, and was a commercial success.

== Plot ==
Tony Arzenta is the top hitman of a Milan-based mob led by Nick Gusto. With a family to take care of, he decides to retire from the business. However, his bosses think he knows too much and try to kill him with a car bomb, which accidentally kills his wife and child instead. Arzenta embarks on a one-man war against the mob in revenge.

== Cast ==
- Alain Delon as Tony Arzenta
- Richard Conte as Nick Gusto
- Carla Gravina as Sandra
- Marc Porel as Domenico Maggio
- Giancarlo Sbragia as Luca Dennino
- Umberto Orsini as Isnello
- Roger Hanin as Carré
- Nicoletta Machiavelli as Anna Arzenta
- Guido Alberti as Don Mariano
- Lino Troisi as Rocco Cutitta
- Anton Diffring as Hans Grunwald
- Silvano Tranquilli as Interpol Inspector Montani
- Corrado Gaipa as Arzenta's father
- Carla Calò as Nunzia, Arzenta's mother
- Ettore Manni as Gesmundo
- Loredana Nusciak as Gesmundo's lover
- Rosalba Neri as Cutitta's wife
- Erika Blanc as Prostitute
- Nazzareno Zamperla as Hitman
- Maria Pia Conte as Carré's secretary
- Alberto Farnese as Nightclub contact

== Production ==
The film was shot on-location in Milan, Turin, Copenhagen, Paris, and Syracuse.

== Release ==
Tony Arzenta was released in France on 23 August 1973. The film was released in Italy on 7 September 1973, where it was distributed by Titanus. It grossed a total of 1,945,982,000 Italian lire on its release.

=== Home media ===
The film was released on Blu-ray in Germany by Explosive Media in January 2022, and in the United Kingdom by Radiance Films in March 2024.

== See also ==
- List of Italian films of 1973
- List of French films of 1973

== Footnotes ==
=== References ===
- Curti, Roberto (2013). Italian Crime Filmography, 1968-1980. McFarland. ISBN 978-0786469765.
