= Roger Lumont =

French actor and artistic director (1934–2025)

- Born: 21 February 1934; Les Lilas, France
- Died: 4 December 2025 (aged 91)
- Occupations: Actor, artistic director

Roger Lumont (French: [ʁɔʒe lymɔ̃]; 21 February 1934 – 4 December 2025) was a French actor and artistic director.

Lumont started his career in the theatre, notably being cast in La Grosse Valse, directed by Robert Dhéry. In film, he received leading roles in the productions Chance Glory and Le Voleur de feuilles. He worked for Synchro France as an artistic director, notably on the television series A Touch of Frost and Law & Order.

Lumont died on 4 December 2025, at the age of 91.

== Filmography ==
- The Train (1964)
- Lucky Jo (1964)
- Fantômas se déchaîne (1965)
- Is Paris Burning? (1966)
- Gendarme in New York (1965)
- How to Steal a Million (1966)
- The Big Restaurant (1966)
- The Night of the Generals (1967)
- Woman Times Seven (1967)
- Mayerling (1968)
- Coplan Saves His Skin (1968)
- The Brain (1969)
- Slogan (1969)
- Les Femmes (1969)
- The Sicilian Clan (1969)
- Tout peut arriver (1969)
- Cran d'arrêt (1970)
- The Lady in the Car with Glasses and a Gun (1970)
- Children of Mata Hari (1970)
- Last Known Address (1970)
- Tropic of Cancer (1970)
- Le Distrait (1970)
- Atlantic Wall (1970)
- The Cop (1970)
- The Savior (1971)
- Just Before Nightfall (1971)
- The Burglars (1971)
- La Part des lions (1971)
- Le Viager (1972)
- The Day of the Jackal (1973)
- I Don't Know Much, But I'll Say Everything (1973)
- The Black Windmill (1974)
- Borsalino & Co. (1974)
- Love and Death (1975)
- Barry of the Great St. Bernard (1977)
- The Hostage Tower (1980)
- Litan (1982)
