= Alice Sapritch =

French actress

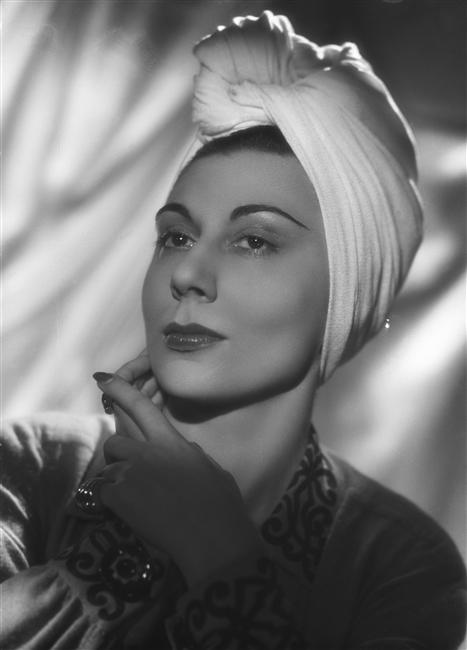
- Sapritch in 1944
- Born: 29 July 1916; Istanbul, Turkey
- Died: 24 March 1990 (aged 73); Paris, France
- Occupation: Actress
- Years active: 1950–1989
- Awards: Cavalier of Legion of Honour

Alice Sapritch (29 July 1916 – 24 March 1990) was a French film actress. She appeared in 66 films between 1950 and 1989.

== Partial filmography ==
- Le tampon du capiston (1950) – La pharmacienne
- Le crime du Bouif (1952)
- If Paris Were Told to Us (1958) – Une dame de la cour (uncredited)
- Premier mai (1958) – Une entraîneuse
- The Gambler (1958) – Marfa
- Checkerboard (1959) – (uncredited)
- Testament of Orpheus (1960) – La Reine des Gitans / Gipsy Queen (uncredited)
- Les Scélérats (1960) – L'invitée qui complimente Thelma
- Shoot the Piano Player (1960) – Concierge (uncredited)
- Candide ou l'optimisme au XXe siècle (1960) – La soeur du baron (uncredited)
- The Menace (1961) – La cliente
- The Girl with the Golden Eyes (1961) – Mme Alberte (uncredited)
- Le Tracassin ou Les Plaisirs de la ville (1961) – La femme au parapluie (uncredited)
- The Two Orphans (1965) – La Frochard
- Who Are You, Polly Magoo? (1966) – The Queen Mother
- Lamiel (1967) – Mme Legrand
- La fille d'en face (1968)
- Le démoniaque (1968) – Mme Fernande Brussette
- L'île aux coquelicots (1970) – La comtesse
- Perched on a Tree (1971) – Lucienne Roubier
- Delusions of Grandeur (1971) – Dona Juana
- Les joyeux lurons (1972) – Léonie, la bonne du curé
- Elle court, elle court la banlieue (1973) – L'automobiliste hargneuse
- La raison du plus fou (1973) – La directrice de la maison de repos
- Le concierge (1973) – La comtesse de Beauchamp-Laville – la locataire du deuxième
- L'affaire Crazy Capo (1973) – Mme Rose
- A Slightly Pregnant Man (1973) – Ramona Martinez
- L'histoire très bonne et très joyeuse de Colinot trousse-chemise (1973) – Dame Blanche
- Les vacanciers (1974) – Tante Aimée
- Le plumard en folie (1974) – La vieille blonde
- Le führer en folie (1974) – Eva Braun
- Gross Paris (1974) – La grande comédienne
- Les Guichets du Louvre (1974) – La vieille dame / Old Lady
- L'intrépide (1975) – Minor rôle (uncredited)
- The Twelve Tasks of Asterix (1976) – (voice)
- Le trouble-fesses (1976) – Marlène
- L'arriviste (1976) – La mère de Marc
- Drôles de zèbres (1977) – Gilda Simfrid
- L'horoscope (1978) – La voyante
- The Bronte Sisters (1979) – La tante Elizabeth Brontë
- A Good Little Devil (1983) – Léontine MacMiche
- Adam et Ève (1984) – Fanchette, dite la Maldiva
- National Lampoon's European Vacation (1985) – Dowager on the Eiffel Tower
