= Housewives on the Job =

1973 film by Ernst Hofbauer

- Directed by: Ernst Hofbauer
- Written by: Werner P. Zibaso
- Produced by: TV13 Filmproduktion
- Starring: Ingrid Steeger; Marie-Georges Pascal; Anne Libert; Elisabeth Volkmann
- Cinematography: Klaus Werner
- Release date: 25 January 1973
- Running time: 88 minutes
- Country: West Germany
- Language: German

Housewives on the Job (German: Hausfrauen Report international) is a 1972 German erotic comedy film directed by Ernst Hofbauer and starring Ingrid Steeger, Marie-Georges Pascal, and Elisabeth Volkmann. Released in 1973, Housewives on the Job is one of the six Hausfrauen Report films produced by Hofbauer, also known for his other sex report film series of Schulmädchen-Report.

== Synopsis ==
Budapest, Londres, Madrid, New York, Paris, Munich: Bernt Mittler reports on housewives' sex lives.

== Cast ==
- Gernot Mohner: Bernt Mittler
- Angelika Baumgart: Brigitte Mittler

Paris:

- Marie-Georges Pascal: Janine
- Paul Bisciglia: Gérard, Janine's husband
- Philippe Gasté: taxi driver

Budapest:

- Anne Libert: Ilona
- Katharina Herbecq: Marika
- Claus Tinney: Istvan

Londres:

- Shirley Corrigan: Grace Stevenson
- Horst keitel: Richard Stevenson
- Peter Kranz: Marty Stevenson

Madrid:

- Elisabeth Volkmann: Doña Dolores
- Rinaldo Talamonti: Dolores's lover
- Erich Padalewski: Don Geronimo
- Gaby Borck: Candelaria

New-York:

- Günther Kieslich: Doctor Goodfellow
- Dorothea Rau: Mabel
- Ingrid Steeger: Sheila
- Karin Lorson: Pamela

Munich:

- Maria Raber: Linda
- Josef Moosholzer: Xaver Kirchhofer
