= Marc Chapiteau =

French actor (born 1946)

Marc Chapiteau (born 17 August 1946) is a French actor.

== Selected filmography ==
- You Can't Hold Back Spring (1971)
- The Best Way to Walk (1976)
- Julien Fontanes, magistrat (1987–88)
- Our Happy Lives (1999)
- Je te mangerais (2007)
- Blood from a Stone (2012)
