= Children of Mata Hari =

1970 film

- Theatrical poster
- Directed by: Jean Delannoy
- Written by: Francis Ryck (novel); Jean Cau; Jean Delannoy
- Produced by: Maurice Jacquin
- Starring: Klaus Kinski
- Cinematography: Edmond Séchan
- Music by: François de Roubaix
- Release date: 3 June 1970
- Running time: 110 minutes
- Countries: France; Italy; West Germany
- Language: French

Children of Mata Hari (French: La Peau de Torpedo, Italian: Dossier 212 - destinazione morte, German: Der Mann mit der Torpedohaut, also known as Pill of Death and The Deathmakers) is a 1970 international co-production crime film directed by Jean Delannoy and starring Klaus Kinski.

== Cast ==
- Stéphane Audran as Dominique
- Klaus Kinski as Pavel Richko / Torpédo I
- Lilli Palmer as Helen
- Michel Constantin as Coster
- Angelo Infanti as Jean / Gianni
- Jean Claudio as La Filature
- Frédéric de Pasquale as Nicolas Baslier
- Noëlle Adam as L'amie de Dominique
- Philippe March as Le vendeur (as Aimé de March)
- Christine Fabréga as Sylvianne Collet
- Jacques Harden as L'inspecteur de Police de Paris
- Micheline Luccioni as L'employée des postes
- Georges Lycan as Torpédo II
- Philippine Pascal as La femme policier
- Bernard Musson as L'inspecteur de Police de Fécamp
- Roger Lumont as Le chauffeur routier
- Robert Favart as Le commissaire principal
- Catherine Jacobsen as La 'boîte aux lettres'
- Pierre Koulak as Un inspecteur
- Michel Charrel as Un inspecteur
- Paul Bisciglia
