= Camille O'Grady =

American musician, visual artist, poet, drag king and performance artist

Camille O'Grady (December 31, 1949 – March 17, 2020) was an American musician, visual artist, poet, drag king, and performance artist. She described herself as a "multimedium" artist.

== Early life ==
Camille O'Grady was born in Orange, New Jersey and was raised in nearby Montclair, New Jersey. She was raised Catholic. She was the eldest of seven siblings. After high school she moved to New York City and studied fine art at the Pratt Institute. At Pratt she met photographer Robert Mapplethorpe.

== Career ==
In 1974 she started the band Leather Secrets, which then became Secrets and then the Camille O'Grady Band. She and her band were involved with the New York punk scene, playing many venues associated with the punk movement such as CBGB and Max's Kansas City. Leather Secrets played with Television and both bands were mentioned by David Bowie, who said “Yes, I've seen a lot of good new bands this time. A lot of bands with good names, anyway, how d'ya like 'Leather Secrets' and 'Television'?” In 1978 Lou Reed invited her to open for him on his Street Hassle tour. Reed described her as "Patti Smith without a social conscience." That same year she also appeared in the gay experimental film New York City Inferno.

O'Grady performed at gay bars and leather clubs, and was one of the few women allowed in New York gay sex club the Mineshaft. She performed as a drag king named "Jake Savage". In 1979 she moved to San Francisco and began to date photographer and art gallery owner Robert Opel. On July 8, 1979, Opel was killed by two men. Camille O'Grady was present for the murder and testified against Opel's killers. She was in the 2010 documentary Uncle Bob, which was about Robert Opel.

== Death ==
On March 17, 2020, Camille O'Grady died from liver cancer.
