= Barry of the Great St. Bernard =

1977 Disney television film

- Genre: Drama
- Based on: Barry of the Great St. Bernard by Adolf Fux
- Directed by: Frank Zuniga
- Starring: Jean-Claude Dauphin; Maurice Teynac; Roger Lumont
- Narrated by: Brad Crandall
- Country of origin: United States
- Original language: English

Production
- Production company: Walt Disney Productions

Original release
- Network: NBC
- Release: January 30 – February 6, 1977

Barry of the Great St. Bernard is a 1977 American television drama film produced by Walt Disney Productions for The Wonderful World of Disney. Directed by Frank Zuniga, it aired in two parts on January 30 and February 6, 1977.

The film was based on Adolf Fux's 1972 book of the same name.

The Robesonian called the film a "thrilling two-part tale", while the Austin Daily Herald described it as an "adventure with a dash of history", and The Manhattan Mercury declared "Barry the St. Bernard is a scene stealer".

== Cast ==
The cast includes:

- Jean-Claude Dauphin as Martin
- Maurice Teynac as Prior
- Roger Lumont as Dr. Bernay
- Sacha Pitoëff as the Sergeant
- Brad Crandall as the Narrator
- Pierre Tabard as Julius
- Pascale Christophe as Simone
