= Countryman (film) =

- Directed by: Dickie Jobson
- Written by: Dickie Jobson; Michael Thomas
- Produced by: Chris Blackwell
- Starring: Countryman (aka Edwin Lothan); Hiram Keller; Carl Bradshaw
- Cinematography: Dominique Chapuis
- Edited by: Peter Boyle; John Victor-Smith
- Music by: Wally Badarou
- Distributed by: Island Pictures
- Release date: 1982
- Running time: 102 minutes
- Country: Jamaica
- Language: English

Countryman is a 1982 action/adventure film directed by Dickie Jobson. It tells the story of a Jamaican fisherman whose solitude is shattered when he rescues two Americans from the wreckage of a plane crash. The fisherman, called Countryman, is hurled into a political plot by the dangerous Colonel Sinclair. Countryman uses his knowledge of the terrain and his innate combat skills to survive and protect his new friends from being caught by Sinclair. This film explores Jamaican culture; at the end of the film, it is described as a tribute to the musical legend Bob Marley whose music is often played throughout the film.

The film was the first from Island Records' new film division. The film was shot in Jamaica and featured a reggae soundtrack performed by Lee "Scratch" Perry, Bob Marley & the Wailers, Steel Pulse, Dennis Brown, Aswad, Toots & The Maytals and Rico Rodriguez. It was written by Jobson and produced by Island Records founder Chris Blackwell and has become a cult classic.

== Cast ==
- Edwin Lothan as Countryman
- Hiram Keller as Bobby Lloyd
- Carl Bradshaw as Capt. Benchley
- Basil Keane as Colonel Sinclair
- Freshey Richardson as Mosman
- Kristina St. Clair as Beau Porter
- Jahman
- Papa Threecards as Sadu Baba
- Munair Zacca as Periera
- Dee Anthony as Mr. Porter
- Ronnie McKay as Wax
