= Tout peut arriver (1969 film) =

- Film poster
- Directed by: Philippe Labro
- Written by: Philippe Labro
- Produced by: Mag Bodard, Gilbert de Goldschmidt
- Starring: Jean-Claude Bouillon, Prudence Harrington and Catherine Allégret
- Cinematography: Willy Kurant
- Edited by: Claude Barrois
- Music by: Eddie Vartan
- Production companies: Madeleine Films, Marianne Productions, Parc Film
- Release date: 1969
- Running time: 85 minutes
- Country: France
- Language: French

Tout peur arriver (Anything Can Happen) is a 1969 French drama film directed and written by Philippe Labro and starring Jean-Claude Bouillon, Prudence Harrington and Catherine Allégret.

== Plot ==
Returning to France after a few months in the United States, a journalist sets out to find his ex-wife, Laura, who has been missing for two months.

At the same time, he hitchhikes across France to write articles about strangers as Jean, Fabrice, and Stella, an American student in Dijon with whom he falls in love.

== Cast ==
- Jean-Claude Bouillon as Philippe Marlot
- Catherine Allégret as Karine, the widow of the singer who committed suicide
- Prudence Harrington as Stella, an American student
- Chantal Goya as Chantal
- Fabrice Luchini as Fabrice
- André Falcon as Jean, the motorist
- Marius Laurey as the man with the gun
- Catherine Deneuve as herself (in an interview)
- Bob Asklöf as the backpacker
- Roger Lumont as the mustachioed trucker
- Jean-François Gobbi as the radio host
- Alix Dufaure as the prostitute with protectors
- O.W. Riegel as Stella's father
- Louis Nucera as The first policeman in the café
- André Asséo as The second policeman in the café
- Philippe Labro as The policeman with the hat
- Bertrand Tavernier as A spectator at the Studio Bertrand film club
- Jacques Lanzmann as Himself, talking about the adaptation of Hair (musical)
- James Arch as A friend of Marlot

== Production ==
The film was partly shot in Dijon.
