= Woman Times Seven =

1967 film by Vittorio De Sica

- Theatrical release poster
- Directed by: Vittorio De Sica
- Screenplay by: Cesare Zavattini
- Produced by: Arthur Cohn
- Starring: Shirley MacLaine; Alan Arkin; Rossano Brazzi; Michael Caine; Vittorio Gassman; Peter Sellers; Anita Ekberg; Elsa Martinelli; Robert Morley; Lex Barker; Patrick Wymark
- Cinematography: Christian Matras
- Edited by: Teddy Darvas; Victoria Spiri-Mercanton
- Music by: Riz Ortolani
- Production companies: Joseph E. Levine Productions; Cormoran Films
- Distributed by: Embassy Pictures (United States); 20th Century Fox (international)
- Release dates: June 27, 1967 (New York City); October 10, 1967 (France); October 27, 1967 (Italy)
- Running time: 108 minutes
- Countries: United States; Italy; France
- Language: English

Woman Times Seven (Italian: Sette volte donna) is a 1967 sex comedy anthology film directed by Vittorio De Sica from a screenplay by Cesare Zavattini. It consists of seven segments, all starring Shirley MacLaine and set in Paris, most of which deal with aspects of adultery.

== Plot ==
=== Paulette (Funeral Procession) ===
Leading a walking funeral procession behind the hearse containing her late husband's coffin, young widow Paulette slowly overcomes her grief when propositioned by her family doctor, the charming Jean.

=== Maria Teresa (Amateur Night) ===
Returning home from Italy a day earlier than planned, Maria Teresa is furious to find her husband Giorgio in bed with her best friend. Out of revenge, she vows to have sex with the first man she meets and storms out. She encounters a group of prostitutes in the Bois de Boulogne who try to help her achieve her goal, but as she loses her nerve, one of the prostitutes has her pimp, Didi, drive Maria Teresa home. On their arrival, Giorgio insults Didi, who responds by punching him in the face, and Marie Teresa rushes to Giorgio's aid.

=== Linda (Two Against One) ===
At a party, beautiful interpreter Linda attracts the attention of an Italian and a Scotsman. While her boyfriend, a flight attendant, is overseas, Linda invites both suitors back to her apartment, where she reads T. S. Eliot in the nude and presents a slideshow of artworks. When one of the men touches Linda, she angrily admonishes them. To redeem themselves, the men repeatedly slap each other. As she becomes aroused, Linda throws her boyfriend's picture out of the window and prepares to join the men in bed.

=== Edith (Super Simone) ===
Edith is the self-effacing wife of Rik, a successful novelist who is obsessed with his wild and adventurous female characters. To compete with her husband's heroines, Edith attempts to emulate one of them, Super Simone. Unnerved by Edith's odd behavior, Rik invites Dr. Xavier, a psychiatrist, to the house to examine her for mental illness. She escapes onto the rooftops, and as Rik scoops her up, she wails, "I'm not crazy! I'm just in love!"

=== Eve (At the Opera) ===
Parisian socialite Eve is appalled to learn that her rival Mme Lisière is wearing a replica of her new gown to the gala reopening of the Palais Garnier that night, even though it was supposed to be an exclusive design. Eve enlists the aid of an employee at her husband's company, who sabotages Lisière by planting a small bomb in her Rolls-Royce. Eve makes a grand entrance at the Palais Garnier, but when an elderly woman arrives wearing the same gown, she runs out of the theater in tears. Upon seeing Lisière arrive, her version of the gown in tatters from the bomb blast, Eve bursts into laughter.

=== Marie (The Suicides) ===
Feeling rejected by the world, two adulterous lovers, Marie and Fred, decide to commit suicide together in a shabby hotel room in Paris, dressed as a bride and groom for the wedding they will never have. However, they argue over the method they should choose, and as they face their planned suicide more seriously, Marie goes into the bathroom. Fred has a change of heart and prepares to sneak away, only to find that Marie has broken out of the bathroom window and has run down the fire escape.

=== Jeanne (Snow) ===
While strolling down the Champs-Élysées on a winter afternoon, two friends, Jeanne and Claudie, notice a handsome man following them. The women decide to go their separate ways to see which one he is after. Jeanne is elated to see that the man is following her. Going home to her husband Victor, Jeanne looks out the window to find the stranger sitting on a bench in the snow. Unbeknownst to Jeanne, the man is a private detective hired by her jealous husband to follow her. The man calls Victor from a nearby phone booth and reassures him that Jeanne is telling the truth about how she spent her day. Afterwards, Jeanne watches as her mystery man departs, while Victor apologizes to her for his jealousy.

== Cast ==
"Funeral Procession"

- Shirley MacLaine as Paulette
- Peter Sellers as Jean
- Elspeth March as Annette
- Vittorio De Sica as mourner (uncredited)

"Amateur Night"

- Shirley MacLaine as Maria Teresa
- Rossano Brazzi as Giorgio
- Laurence Badie as prostitute
- Judith Magre as Bitter Thirty
- Catherine Samie as Jeannine
- Zanie Campan as prostitute
- Robert Duranton as Didi

"Two Against One"

- Shirley MacLaine as Linda
- Vittorio Gassman as Cenci
- Clinton Greyn as MacCormack

"Super Simone"

- Shirley MacLaine as Edith
- Lex Barker as Rik
- Elsa Martinelli as pretty woman
- Robert Morley as Dr. Xavier
- Jessie Robins as Marianne, Edith's maid

"At the Opera"

- Shirley MacLaine as Eve Minou
- Patrick Wymark as Henri Minou, Eve's husband
- Adrienne Corri as Mme Lisière
- Michael Brennan as Monsieur Lisière
- Jacques Ciron as Féval (uncredited)
- Roger Lumont as Nossereau (uncredited)
- Roger Trapp as Crosnier (uncredited)
- Louis Alexandre Raimon as himself (uncredited)

"The Suicides"

- Shirley MacLaine as Marie
- Alan Arkin as Fred

"Snow"

- Shirley MacLaine as Jeanne
- Michael Caine as handsome stranger
- Anita Ekberg as Claudie
- Philippe Noiret as Victor
- Georges Adet as old man (uncredited)
- Jacques Legras as salesman (uncredited)

== Production ==
Woman Times Seven was the first of what was intended to be three films made by Joseph E. Levine, producer Arthur Cohn and Vittorio De Sica working together. As Levine and De Sica had critical and financial success with the films Yesterday, Today and Tomorrow (1963) and Marriage Italian Style (1964), Levine asked De Sica for a similar film, and De Sica used some sketches made by his collaborator Cesare Zavattini as the basis. The first choice for the lead role, Natalie Wood, declined the role.

Filming took place from October 10, 1966, to January 10, 1967, at the Boulogne Studios in Paris. Wardrobe was supplied by Pierre Cardin, jewelry by Van Cleef & Arpels, furs by Henri Stern and hairdressing by Louis Alexandre Raimon.

Lord Lucan, later to be suspected of murder, unsuccessfully screen-tested for a role in the film. After that failure, he declined an invitation from Albert R. Broccoli to audition for the part of James Bond.

== Reception ==
=== Box office ===
According to Fox records, the film needed to earn $2,975,000 in rentals to break even, and made $1,100,000, meaning it made a loss.

=== Critical response ===
In a contemporary review for The New York Times, critic Bosley Crowther harshly denounced the film: "For a man who has treated women as nicely as Vittorio De Sica has—as witness the several classic characters he has created with Sophia Loren—it is shocking and thoroughly bewildering to find him kicking them around as he does in his new picture ... Not one of the seven silly females whom Shirley MacLaine portrays in this series of seven blackout sketches provokes any feeling but disgust—or possibly embarrassment and pity—for the weaker (shall we say minded?) sex. Not one of them has the charm, the humor or the vitality we've come to expect in Mr. De Sica's women. And not one of them shows a spark of truth."

Variety wrote: "Woman Times Seven means a seven-segment showcase for the talents of Shirley MacLaine, playing in tragicomedy and dramatic fashion a variety of femme types. MacLaine is spotted in many different adult situations, and largely convinces with each switcheroo."

=== Accolades ===
The film earned Shirley MacLaine a nomination for Best Actress in a Motion Picture – Musical or Comedy at the 25th Golden Globes.

== Novelization ==
Shortly before the release of the film Fawcett Gold Medal released a novelization by author and TV dramatist Charles Einstein.
