= 1978 in French television =

This is a list of French television related events from 1978.

== Events ==
- 26 March – Joël Prévost is selected to represent France at the 1978 Eurovision Song Contest with his song "Il y aura toujours des violons". He is selected to be the twenty-second French Eurovision entry during a national final.
- 22 April – The 23rd Eurovision Song Contest is held at the Palais des Congrès in Paris. Israel wins the contest with the song "A-Ba-Ni-Bi", performed by Izhar Cohen and the Alphabeta.

== Debuts ==
- 4 January – 1, rue Sésame (1978–1982)

La vérité est au fond de la marmite

== Television shows ==
=== 1940s ===
- Le Jour du Seigneur (1949–present)

=== 1950s ===
- Présence protestante (1957–)

=== 1960s ===
- Les Dossiers de l'écran (1967–1991)
- Monsieur Cinéma (1967–1980)
- Les Animaux du monde (1969–1990)
- Alain Decaux raconte (1969–1987)
- Télé-Philatélie

=== 1970s ===
- Aujourd'hui Madame (1970–1982)
- 30 millions d'amis (1976–2016)
- Les Jeux de 20 Heures (1976–1987)

== Ending this year ==
- La Piste aux étoiles (1956–1978)
- La Tête et les Jambes (1960–1978)

== Births ==
- 22 July – Louise Ekland, British-born TV presenter

== See also ==
- 1978 in France
- List of French films of 1978
