= You Will Be Mine =

You Will Be Mine Je te mangerais
- Directed by: Sophie Laloy
- Written by: Sophie Laloy
- Starring: Judith Davis; Isild Le Besco
- Production company: Little Stone Distribution
- Release date: 2009 (France)
- Running time: 96 minutes
- Country: France
- Language: French

Je te mangerais (literally I will eat you in English; marketed under the title You Will be Mine) is a 2009 French drama film written and directed by Sophie Laloy.

== Synopsis ==
Marie (Judith Davis) moves to Lyon to attend the conservatory. Her parents have arranged for her to live in the apartment of a distant friend, Emma. Emma (Isild Le Besco) has been living alone since her father died and her mother left her to move to New York. Living together with this childhood friend, whom she had forgotten, proves difficult for Marie, as Emma is very possessive. Emma's demands, which she put up with at first, turned out to be increasingly painful for Marie, who does not have friends. One evening, Emma loses control of herself and tries to get intimate with Marie, who is so upset that her studies suffer. Emma wants Marie to be all hers, and in her sick desire, she will do anything. Marie realizes that Emma is like a child deprived of love, but she is unable to bear the intimacy that is destroying her life. The result is a tumultuous relationship between the two students, who are successively friends, lovers and enemies; the feelings between them evolve to the rhythm of the music.

== Cast ==
- Judith Davis : Marie Dandin
- Isild Le Besco : Emma
- Édith Scob : Mademoiselle Lainé
- Johan Libéreau : Sami Decker
- Marc Chapiteau : Hervé Dandin
- Fabienne Babe : Odile Dandin
- Alain Beigel : Yves
- Denis Ménochet : Yves's friend

== Production ==
The film was shot in Paris, as well as in Lyon for many of the exteriors.
