= Lifespan (film) =

1976 film

- DVD edition cover
- Directed by: Alexander Whitelaw
- Written by: Judith Rascoe; Alva Ruben; Sandy Whitelaw
- Produced by: Alexander Whitelaw
- Starring: Hiram Keller; Tina Aumont; Klaus Kinski
- Cinematography: Eduard van der Enden
- Edited by: Jan Dop
- Music by: Terry Riley
- Release date: 1 October 1976
- Running time: 85 minutes
- Country: Netherlands
- Language: English

Lifespan is a 1976 Dutch thriller film directed by Alexander Whitelaw and starring Hiram Keller, Tina Aumont and Klaus Kinski.

== Plot ==
American Dr. Ben Land travels to Amsterdam to meet with Dr. Linden, an expert on aging who is supposedly close to a breakthrough. Unfortunately, Dr. Linden is discovered hanged and Ben is left with only baffling clues. He becomes intimate with Anna, who worked as a bondage model for the doctor. In an extended and controversial scene, the two engage in light shibari bondage of Anna, the first such instance of bondage in mainstream media. Later, Ben discovers that Anna knows more than she should about the mysterious 'Swiss man', Nicholas Ulrich.

== Cast ==
- Hiram Keller as Dr. Ben Land
- Tina Aumont as Anna
- Klaus Kinski as Nicholas Ulrich
- Adrian Brine as Dr. Winston
- Rudi Falkenhagen as Police inspector
- Rudolf Lucieer as Journalist
- Sacco van der Made as Animal feeder
- Paul Melton as Journalist
- Helen van Meurs as Psychiatrist
- Onno Molenkamp as Director of old age home
- Frans Mulder as Pim Henke
- Lydia Polak as Lydia
- Fons Rademakers as Prof. van Arp
- Joan Remmelts as Family doctor
- Dick Scheffer as Official from ministry of science
- Eric Schneider - as . Linden
- André van den Heuvel as Felix Dolda
- Albert Van Doorn as Emile van der Lutte
