= You Can't Hold Back Spring =

1971 drama film

- Directed by: René Gilson
- Screenplay by: René Gilson
- Produced by: Pierre Braunberger
- Starring: Marc Chapiteau; Jeanne Goupil
- Cinematography: Pierre-William Glenn
- Edited by: Thierry Derocles; Chantal Ellia-Gilson
- Release date: 1971
- Language: French

You Can't Hold Back Spring (French: On n'arrête pas le printemps) is a 1971 French drama film written and directed by René Gilson. It was screened at the 32nd edition of the Venice Film Festival.

== Cast ==
- Marc Chapiteau as Jean
- Jeanne Goupil as Sylvie
- Gilda Laghan as Jeanne
- Didier Blandeuil as Julien
- René Gilson
- André Thorent
