= A Real Young Girl =

1976 French film

- French poster
- French: Une vraie jeune fille
- Directed by: Catherine Breillat
- Written by: Catherine Breillat
- Based on: Le Soupirail by Catherine Breillat
- Produced by: Pierre Richard Muller; André Génovès
- Starring: Charlotte Alexandra; Hiram Keller; Rita Maiden; Bruno Balp
- Cinematography: Patrick Daert; Pierre Fattori
- Edited by: Annie Charrier; Michèle Quevroy
- Music by: Mort Shuman
- Distributed by: Rézo Films
- Release date: 4 February 1999 (IFFR); (produced in 1976)
- Running time: 93 minutes (uncut)
- Country: France
- Language: French

A Real Young Girl (French: Une vraie jeune fille) is a 1976 French drama film about a 14-year-old girl's sexual awakening, written and directed by Catherine Breillat. It was based on her fourth novel, Le Soupirail.

This film, Breillat's first, is notable for its graphic depiction of sex scenes, which include Charlotte Alexandra exposing her breasts and vulva and the male actors displaying their penises. This led to the film being banned in many countries, and it was not released to theatres until 2000.

== Plot ==
Alice Bonnard is a 14-year-old girl attending a boarding school in France who comes back to her home in the Landes forest for the summer of 1963. In voiceover, she complains that she dislikes coming home because she is frequently bored. In one scene, as she has coffee with her parents, she inserts a spoon into her vagina. During her evening walk, she pulled her underwear to her ankle and strolled around the yard. At night after dinner, she vomits and starts to write in her diary.

She flashes back to her time at school, where she frequently masturbated out of boredom. Her father hires a young man named Jim, with whom Alice immediately becomes infatuated. Over the days, Alice continuously visits the factory to chance upon Jim. Alice has a graphic sexual fantasy in which Jim ties her to the ground with barbed wire and attempts to insert an earthworm into her vagina. When the earthworm will not fit, Jim tears it into small pieces and puts them in Alice's pubic hair.

At a carnival, a middle-aged man exposes himself to her on a ride. She then arrives home and imagines seeing her father's penis. She exposes herself to Jim, and the two masturbate in front of each other, to Alice's chagrin. She discovers her father is having an affair, and Jim tries pressuring her into having sex. She agrees, but only if he has a contraceptive pill to avoid pregnancy. It develops that he has a fiancée and must sneak in at night to meet up with Alice. He is shot and killed by a trap that Alice's father set up to keep wild boar out of his maize field.

== Cast ==
- Charlotte Alexandra as Alice Bonnard
- Hiram Keller as Pierre-Evariste Renard / "Jim" / "Earthworm Jim"
- Rita Maiden as Mrs. Bonnard
- Bruno Balp as Mr. Bonnard
- Georges Guéret as Martial
- Shirley Stoler as Grocer in Aupom

== Production ==
This film has no closing credits; instead, an instrumental version of the song "Suis-je une petite fille" (Am I a little girl) plays over a black screen.

Though playing a 14-year-old, Charlotte Alexandra was 20 years old at the time of the film's production.

== Reception ==
On review aggregator website Rotten Tomatoes the film has a score of 71% based on reviews from 7 critics, with an average rating of 6.8/10.

Critic Brian Price called A Real Young Girl a "transgressive look at the sexual awakening of an adolescent girl", an "awkward film" which "represents Breillat at her most Bataillesque, freely mingling abstract images of female genitalia, mud, and rodents into this otherwise realist account of a young girl's" coming of age. Price argued that the film's approach is in line with Linda Williams's defense of literary pornography, which Williams describes as an "elitist, avant-garde, intellectual, and philosophical pornography of imagination" versus the "mundane, crass materialism of a dominant mass culture". He added "there is no way ... to integrate this film into a commodity driven system of distribution", because it "does not offer visual pleasure, at least not one that comes without intellectual engagement, and more importantly, rigorous self-examination". As such, Breillat has insisted that sex is the subject, not the object, of her work.

Lisa Alspector, reviewing the film in the Chicago Reader, called the film's "theories about sexuality and trauma ... more nuanced and intuitive than those of most schools of psychology", and noted the film's use of a blend of dream sequences with realistic scenes. John Petrakis of the Chicago Tribune noted that Breillat "has long been fascinated with the idea that women are not allowed to go through puberty in private but instead seem to be on display for all to watch, a situation that has no parallel with boys". Petrakis points out that Breillat's film "seems acutely aware of this paradox". A. O. Scott from The New York Times called the film "crude, unpolished, yet curiously dreamy". Maitland McDonagh in TV Guide also commented on the film's curious nature in her review: "neither cheerfully naughty nor suffused with gauzy prurience, [the film] evokes a time of turbulent (and often ugly) emotions with disquieting intensity". Other reviewers, such as The Christian Science Monitor's David Sterritt, view the film as a waypoint in the director's early development toward becoming "a world-class filmmaker".

Several reviewers have commented on the film's frank treatment of unusual sexual fantasies and images. Filmcritic.com's Christopher Null pointed out that the film was "widely banned for its hefty pornographic content", and called it one of Breillat's "most notorious" films. Null says "viewers should be warned" about the film's "graphic shots" of "sexual awakening ... (and) sensory disturbances", such as the female lead vomiting all over herself and playing with her earwax. While Null rated this "low-budget work ... about a 3 out of 10 on the professionalism scale" and admitted that "it barely makes a lick of sense", he conceded that "there's something oddly compelling and poetic about the movie". The Village Voice's J. Hoberman called the film a "philosophical gross-out comedy rudely presented from the perspective of a sullen, sexually curious 14-year-old". The New York Post's Jonathan Foreman called the film a "test of endurance, and not just because you need a rather stronger word than 'explicit' to describe this long-unreleased, self-consciously provocative film".

== See also ==
- 36 Fillette
- Fat Girl
- List of mainstream movies with unsimulated sex
