= A Night at the Moulin Rouge =

- Directed by: Jean-Claude Roy
- Written by: Gloria Phillips; Jean-Claude Roy
- Produced by: Alphonse Gimeno; Gloria Phillips
- Starring: Tilda Thamar; Noël Roquevert; Jean Tissier
- Cinematography: Pierre Dolley
- Edited by: Jacques Mavel
- Music by: Francis Lopez
- Production company: Gimeno Phillips Films
- Distributed by: Globe Omnium Films
- Release date: 7 August 1957
- Running time: 90 minutes
- Country: France
- Language: French

A Night at the Moulin Rouge (French: Une nuit au Moulin-Rouge) is a 1957 French comedy film directed by Jean-Claude Roy and starring Tilda Thamar, Noël Roquevert and Jean Tissier. Much of the film is portrayed as taking place in the Moulin Rouge cabaret nightclub in Paris.

== Cast ==
- Tilda Thamar as Tania Tango
- Noël Roquevert as Gaston Guillaumet
- Jean Tissier
- Maurice Baquet
- Marie Dubas
- Amédée
- Miguel Amador
- Michèle Bardollet
- Armand Bernard
- Denise Carvenne
- Georges Galley
- Gascard
- Lisette Lebon
- Doris Marnier
- Gaston Orbal
- Dominique Page
- Maurice Sarfati
- Robert Seller

== Bibliography ==
- St. Pierre, Paul Matthew. E.A. Dupont and his Contribution to British Film: Varieté, Moulin Rouge, Piccadilly, Atlantic, Two Worlds, Cape Forlorn. Fairleigh Dickinson University Press, 2010.
