= Goto, Island of Love =

1969 film

- Film poster
- Directed by: Walerian Borowczyk
- Written by: Walerian Borowczyk; Dominique Duvergé
- Produced by: Louis Duchesne; René Thévenet
- Starring: Pierre Brasseur
- Cinematography: Guy Durban
- Edited by: Charles Bretoneiche
- Release date: 19 January 1969
- Running time: 93 minutes
- Country: France
- Language: French

Goto, Island of Love (French: Goto, l'île d'amour) is a 1969 French drama film directed by Walerian Borowczyk and starring Pierre Brasseur.

== Cast ==
- Pierre Brasseur - Goto
- Ligia Branice - Glossia
- Jean-Pierre Andréani - Gono
- Ginette Leclerc - Gonasta
- Fernand Bercher - L'instituteur / Professor
- Michel Charrel - Grymp
- Pierre Collet
- Raoul Darblay - General Gwino
- Rudy Lenoir - Le juge d'instruction

== Critical reception ==
In her review for Le Monde, Nicole Zand stated:

With this realistic parody that is Goto, Borowczyk discovers a new path for his exploration of the nightmare of the world, and his film, disturbing, subtle, tender, and cruel, reflects a freedom possessed only by true creators.
