= Hot and Naked =

- Directed by: Guy Maria
- Written by: Georges Combret
- Produced by: Paul Laffargue
- Starring: Bob Asklöf; Marie-Georges Pascal
- Cinematography: Jacques Ledoux
- Edited by: Roger Ikhlef
- Distributed by: Étoile Distribution (France); Cinépix Film Properties (Canada)
- Release dates: 10 April 1974 (France); 23 August 1975 (Japan); 1976 (Canada)
- Running time: 88 minutes
- Country: France
- Language: French

Hot and Naked, also known as Thrill Seekers (French: Quand les filles se déchaînent) is a 1974 French erotic action film directed by Guy Maria.

== Cast ==
- Bob Asklöf : Karl
- Jean-Michel Dhermay : Jimmy
- Marie-Georges Pascal : Melanie (Mylène in French original version)
- Anne Kerylen : Lily (Liliane)
- Jacqueline Laurent (actress, 1941) : Camilla (Camille)
- Maurice Bataille : Le patron des cascadeurs

== Releases ==
DVD Released in 2007 in the US by Substance. (English dubbed)
