= Seven Deaths in the Cat's Eye =

- Italian film poster
- Directed by: Antonio Margheriti
- Screenplay by: Giovanni Simonelli; Antonio Margheriti
- Produced by: Luigi Nannerini
- Starring: Jane Birkin; Hiram Keller; Venantino Venantini; Doris Kunstmann
- Cinematography: Carlo Carlini
- Edited by: Giorgio Serrallonga
- Music by: Riz Ortolani
- Production companies: Falcon International Film S.r.l.; Roxy Film GmbH & Co. KG; Capitole Films
- Distributed by: Jumbo
- Release dates: 12 April 1973 (Italy); 7 December 1973 (West Germany)
- Running time: 95 minutes
- Countries: Italy; West Germany; France
- Box office: ₤219.556 million

Seven Deaths in the Cat's Eye (Italian: La morte negli occhi del gatto) is a 1973 Gothic horror film directed by Antonio Margheriti. It is also a rare example of an Italian giallo that is set in period, taking place some time in the 1890s.

== Plot ==
In Scotland, a man is murdered with a razor. The killer then drags the body into a dungeon and is followed by a ginger cat. A carriage later drives up to Dragonstone Castle, a castle in the highlands of Scotland. The passenger, Corringa, used to spend her summers with her mother there. A gorilla watches the carriage from an upper window in the castle.

At the castle, Corringa reunites with her mother, Lady Alicia, and her aunt, the penniless owner of the castle, Lady Mary MacGrieff. Other residents of the castle are Dr. Franz, a Priest, French teacher Suzanna, and the mad son and heir of Lady Mary, Lord James MacGrieff. After the dinner party, the killer suffocates Lady Alicia with a pillow as she sleeps while the ginger cat watches. Meanwhile, Corringa is disturbed by finding James standing outside her window. Afterward, she hears the cat meowing, which leads her to find a secret passageway hidden behind a portrait in her room. The passageway takes her to the dungeon, where she finds the man's body. Frightened, Corringa faints and is found by the servants. They try to tell her mother of the incident but instead find her dead. During the funeral, the cat jumps on the casket, which is supposedly a sign that the deceased is a vampire, according to the legend of the MacGrieffs. This legend states that any MacGrieff killed by another MacGrieff will come back to life as a vampire.

After the funeral, Corringa goes to her cousin James' room seeking answers. There she is frightened to discover the gorilla, James, in a cage among other animals that are dead. She leaves after telling him of the body in the cellar and him telling her to go to the police. Mr. Angus is then murdered outside the tomb of Lady Alicia by a gloved figure who slits his throat with a razor while the cat watches. That same night, Corringa dreams that her mother is a vampire, and the cat disturbs her sleep. Mr. Angus is found by Dr. Franz the following morning.

The next night, the gloved hand unlocks the gorilla's cage. Concurrently, Corringa visits her mother's tomb to search for confirmation that her mother is still there. She finds the coffin splintered, and her mother's tomb is open. She runs away, frightened, and James catches her and takes her back to the house. That night, James and Corringa sleep together. They are interrupted by Lady Mary looking for Dr. Franz. When she does not find him there, she goes to his bedroom and sees him kissing Suzanna. Convinced he'll be thrown out of the house, Dr. Franz goes to James' room to tell him the truth about his little sister's death. Once inside, his throat is slashed with a razor by a gloved hand with the cat watching.

In the morning, a detective comes to collect the death certificates of the two known deaths, and Corringa reveals to him that her mother's body is not in the coffin. When they go to the tomb, her body is missing, but Dr. Franz's body is there. Corringa finds James' cufflink on the ground beside it. When she confronts James about it, he says he moved the body but did not kill him. James, the gorilla, was also killed. The detective believes James is responsible for the deaths, causing him to hide beneath the castle's passages. There, he hears moaning that leads him to the dying priest who has blood on his forehead.

The next victim is Suzanna, who is killed the same way as the men. Corringa finds Lady Mary leaning over Suzanna's body and believes her to be the killer. After she runs through the secret passageway from her room to the cellar, she finds her mother's body. The priest then comes down the stairs and reveals himself to be a MacGrieff, masquerading as the priest to kill the remaining MacGrieffs so that he can inherit the estate. James, the detective, and the police come just in time to shoot him before he can kill Corringa.

== Cast ==
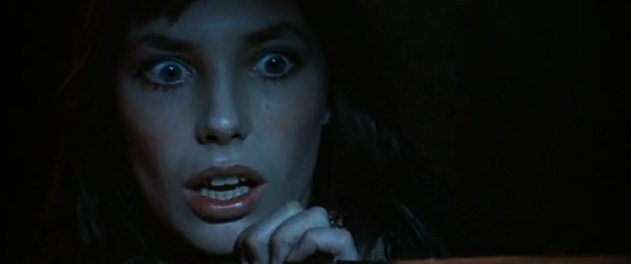
Jane Birkin as Corringa in Seven Deaths in the Cat's Eye

- Jane Birkin as Corringa
- Hiram Keller as Lord James MacGrieff
- Françoise Christophe as Lady Mary MacGrieff
- Venantino Venantini as Padre Robertson
- Doris Kunstmann as Suzanne
- Anton Diffring as Dr. Franz
- Dana Ghia as Lady Alicia
- Serge Gainsbourg as a Police Inspector
- Konrad Georg as Campbell
- Alan Collins as Angus
- Bianca Doria as Janet Campbell

== Historical context ==
In the 1970s Italy went through a major economic crisis and a reordering of the class system. The aristocracy were disadvantaged because of the economic crisis. In the film, this is reflected through Lady MacGrieff's financial troubles that cause her to consider the castle that has been in the family for many years. Because the film also has roots in France, it is appropriate to look at the impact that the condition of France in the 1970s had on the film. France in the 1970s was in the midst of "student turmoil", where many young students fought for the new age and liberation from traditional ideas. This is reflected in the film by the bisexual French teacher Suzanne, who attempts to find sexual liberation and recognition for other bisexuals.

== Production ==
The film's credits state its story is based on a novella by Peter Bryan. It is unclear whether this was a pseudonym for an author of Italian giallo magazines, or the British novelist Peter Bryan who wrote scripts for Hammer such as The Hound of the Baskervilles and Brides of Dracula. Film historian Roberto Curti origin story being an adaptation of a novel, finding no proof of the book ever existing. Curti notes the original script does not credit Bryan's story and only credits to Margheriti and Simonelli.

Seven Deaths in the Cat's Eye was filmed between February and March 1972. Among the cast was Jane Birkin, at the time still mainly known for the popular song "Je t'aime... moi non plus" which she had recorded with her lover Serge Gainsbourg. Margheriti also cast Gainsbourg in a bit part, and later stated that Gainsbourg had asked, while visiting Birkin on set, to play a cameo in the film. The film's score by Riz Ortolani uses cues from previous Margheriti films such as The Virgin of Nuremberg, Castle of Blood and Seven Deaths.

== Release ==
Seven Deaths in the Cat's Eye was released in Italy, where it was distributed by Jumbo, as La morte negli occhi del gatto on 12 April 1973. The film grossed 219,556,000 Italian lire domestically. The film was later released in West Germany on 7 December 1973, under the title Sieben Tote in den Augen der Katze.
