= Don't Deliver Us from Evil =

- French-language poster
- French: Mais ne nous délivrez pas du mal
- Literally: Don't Deliver Us from Evil
- Directed by: Joël Séria
- Written by: Joël Séria
- Produced by: Bernard Legargeant; Joël Séria
- Starring: Jeanne Goupil; Catherine Wagener
- Cinematography: Marcel Combes
- Edited by: Philippe Gosselet
- Music by: Claude Germain; Dominique Ney
- Production companies: Société Générale de Production; Productions Tanit
- Distributed by: Les Films Fernand Rivers
- Release dates: 5 April 1971 (Cannes); 7 January 1972 (United Kingdom)
- Running time: 101 minutes
- Country: France
- Language: French

Don't Deliver Us from Evil (French: Mais ne nous délivrez pas du mal) is a 1971 French horror drama film directed by Joël Séria, in his directorial debut, and starring Jeanne Goupil, Catherine Wagener, and Bernard Dhéran. It follows two Catholic schoolgirls in France who are drawn toward increasingly evil deeds. It is loosely based on the Parker–Hulme murder case of 1954.

The film was controversial upon release due to its depiction of adolescent crime and sexuality, receiving an X rating in the United Kingdom and being banned in its native France.

== Plot ==
Anne de Boissy and Lore Fournier are two adolescent girls at a Catholic boarding school, both from affluent and conservative families living near each other in the countryside. Exclusive friends, they read poems about the beauty of death and engage in malicious pranks and petty theft, believing not only that church is downright fatuous but that they are special and untouchable.

During the summer vacation, when Anne's parents take a long trip and leave her behind in their château, she and Lore spend much time together. The girls set fire to the barn of a local farmer and let his cows loose as punishment for his attempted rape of Lore. Anne persecutes the mentally handicapped groundskeeper, killing his caged bird just to make him suffer. After stealing hosts and vestments from the church, the girls prepare an abandoned chapel for a Black Mass in which they wed themselves to Satan, promising more wicked works in his name, and mingle their blood to seal their bond.

One night, a motorist runs out of fuel near the château. The girls invite him in, offer him alcohol, strip to their underclothes, and begin to entice him. When the man attempts to rape Lore, Anne saves her by bludgeoning him to death and the two dispose of the body in the lake. The girls are among people questioned by the police about the missing man, but reveal nothing.

Back at school, a senior detective arrives to question each further and they become really frightened. Suspecting that the detective knows what they have done, they plan a suicide pact, convinced they will go to Hell and be rewarded by Satan for their service. At a school concert attended by all the parents, every performance gets loud applause, including Anne and Lore who recite a dark poem by Baudelaire. As the audience clap and cheer, they douse themselves with petrol and set themselves alight.

== Cast ==
- Jeanne Goupil as Anne de Boissy
- Catherine Wagener as Lore Fournier
- Bernard Dhéran as motorist
- Gérard Darrieu as Émile
- Marc Dudicourt as almoner
- Michel Robin as Léon
- Véronique Silver as Countess de Boissy
- Jean-Pierre Helbert as Count de Boissy
- Nicole Mérouze as Mrs. Fournier
- Henri Poirier as Mr Fournier
- Serge Frédéric as priest
- René Berthier as Gustave
- Frédéric Nort
- Jean-Daniel Ehrmann

== Production ==
The film's screenplay by writer-director Joël Séria was loosely based on the 1954 Parker–Hulme murder case in New Zealand, in which two adolescent girls—Pauline Parker and Juliet Hulme—plotted and killed Parker's mother.

== Release ==
The film was screened as part of the Directors Fortnight at the 1971 Cannes Film Festival, It was submitted for approval by the British Board of Film Classification in December 1971 and received an X rating before being released theatrically in the United Kingdom on 7 January 1972. Despite significant cuts, the film was banned in its native France by the Ministry of Cultural Affairs, who issued the statement:

The theme, extremely daring in itself, has been exploited to the full and gives rise to a work that the Commission considers as one of the most unhealthy that it has had to examine, on account of the perversion, the sadism and the seeds of moral and mental destruction that are contained therein.

It also went unreleased theatrically in the United States. The film's controversy was utilized in its British marketing campaign, which advertised it as "The French film banned in France!"

=== Critical response ===
Patrick Gibbs of The Daily Telegraph addressed the film's controversial content, but added that, "artistically, it's beautifully done, with just the right touch of fantasy, and, as things go in the cinema these days, it's not only moral in conclusion but, I think, generally inoffensive." Critic Derek Malcolm praised the lead performances in the film, though he noted that its pacing "becomes a little too repetitive. Some of the necessary subtlety is clearly beyond [Séria]. But as a first film it is at least provoking and original."

=== Home media ===
Mondo Macabro released Don't Deliver Us from Evil on DVD in June 2006 before issuing a newly restored 2K Blu-ray disc in February 2023.

== See also ==
- Les Chants de Maldoror, which the girls read from and reference.
- Les Fleurs du mal, from which the girls chant various poems before dying.
- Heavenly Creatures, another film based on the same murder case.
