= New York City Inferno =

1978 film by Jacques Scandelari

- Film title card
- Directed by: Jacques Scandelari (Note: Credited as Marvin Merkins.)
- Screenplay by: Jacques Scandelari; Elliott Stein
- Produced by: Jean-Pierre Salomon
- Starring: Alain-Guy Giraudon; Bob Bleecker
- Cinematography: François About
- Edited by: Pierre-Alain Beauchard
- Music by: Jacques Morali; Village People
- Production companies: Troika Films; Verbois Films
- Distributed by: Verbois Films
- Release date: June 14, 1978
- Running time: 95 minutes
- Country: France
- Languages: French, English

New York City Inferno (alternately titled From Paris to New York and Cock Tales in certain North American home video releases) is a 1978 French experimental gay pornographic film by Jacques Scandelari. The film follows Jérôme (Alain-Guy Giraudon), a Parisian man who has traveled to New York City in search of his lover Paul (Bob Bleecker). New York City Inferno is directed by Scandelari, who also wrote the film's screenplay based on a concept by Elliott Stein. The soundtrack is arranged by Jacques Morali, and features officially-licensed songs by the Village People.

== Plot ==
In June 1977, Paul departs Paris for a week-long vacation to New York City, a trip taken in part to reflect on his strained relationship with his lover Jérôme. He writes to Jérôme daily, and in his last letter, states that he has decided to leave Jérôme and stay in New York permanently. In December, Jérôme travels to New York to search for Paul, and to determine why he has left Paris.

In New York, a cab driver with whom Jérôme subsequently has sex in a meat locker suggests that he visit Warehouse, a popular new BDSM gay bar in Greenwich Village. Over the course of his week-long visit, Jérôme visits the locations mentioned by Paul in his letters, including the Meatpacking District, the Christopher Street Pier, a sex shop, and a tattoo parlor. At each location he cruises for sex and is introduced to the city's thriving gay scene; he meets a French woman getting her first tattoo, an activist with the National Gay Task Force campaigning against Anita Bryant, and multiple paramours.

Jérôme visits an oracle mentioned by Paul at a market in Spanish Harlem, who performs a ritual with Jérôme's semen. The oracle divines that Paul left Paris because he wished to be dominated, and that he will only return if Jérôme becomes the master to Paul's new lover. He instructs Jérôme to visit Warehouse that Friday; Jérôme visits in leather garments, where he witnesses Paul collared and leashed to his new lover at the center of an orgy. Jérôme and Paul make extended eye contact, and the film abruptly cuts to Jérôme and Paul departing New York together as Paul's lover looks on.

== Cast ==
- Alain-Guy Giraudon (Note: Credited as Christopher Dock.) as Jérôme
- Bob Bleecker as Paul
- John Houston as Rex
- Bill Grove as Joe
- David Charles as Tom
- Luke Morelay as The Oracle
- David Barrow as Keith
- Camille O'Grady as Leather Club Performer
- Dady La Flippée as Tattooed Girl

Rodger Gay, Keeson, Greg Christopher, Mark Lexington, Frank Bedford, Vic Sheridan, Steven Bank, Tommy Charles, and Victor Hudson are credited as additional actors.

== Production and release ==
New York City Inferno was directed by Jacques Scandelari, with a screenplay by Scandelari based on a concept from Elliott Stein. The film's soundtrack was arranged by record producer Jacques Morali and features licensed music from the Village People, specifically "I Am What I Am" and "Macho Man". New York City Inferno is Scandelari's second gay pornographic film, following his 1977 film Homologues. It is one of six films funded by French gay pornography producer Norbert Terry that were shot on location in New York City, and was filmed in and around the Meatpacking District and Greenwich Village. Principal photography on the film was completed in just four days.

New York City Inferno was given an X rating by the Centre national du cinéma, which noted that the film's scenes contained "a certain element of cruelty." The English language portions of the film were not subtitled in the film's initial French release, though a translation of the scene featuring Jérôme and the National Gay Task Force activist was published in the French gay men's magazine Soft Men.

== Reception and legacy ==
Critic Maxime Lachaud has described New York City Inferno as an "unclassifiable work", comparing it to mondo cinema for its depictions of unsimulated sex, its pseudo-documentary filming style, and its unvarnished portrayal of New York City gay life prior to the 1980s HIV/AIDS epidemic. Lachaud offers specific praise for the film's "richness of tone and its almost experimental construction," calling it a "radical work of art at a time when homosexuality in France was still considered a crime."

In his review for Spécial Man: L'homosexualite Au Cinema, Philippe de Mazières wrote "the bestial relations of the mustached queens in New York City are incomparable to the tender juvenile pettings of little French boy scouts; it's a journey to the end of the night, a tale of exhaustion and the proximity of death; New York City Inferno is the reflection of a wild and violent desire."

New York City Inferno has enjoyed contemporary success as a cult film. In 2014, it was chosen by director Jacques Audiard to be screened at L'Étrange Festival.
