= Immoral Tales (film) =

1973 film directed by Walerian Borowczyk

- Film poster for Immoral Tales
- Directed by: Walerian Borowczyk
- Written by: Walerian Borowczyk
- Story by: André Pieyre de Mandiargues
- Produced by: Anatole Dauman
- Starring: Lise Danvers; Paloma Picasso; Charlotte Alexandra; Fabrice Luchini; Florence Bellamy; Pascale Christophe
- Cinematography: Bernard Daillencourt; Guy Durban; Noël Véry; Michel Zolat
- Edited by: Walerian Borowczyk
- Music by: Maurice Le Roux
- Distributed by: Argos Films
- Release dates: September 1973 (United Kingdom); August 28, 1974 (France)
- Running time: 105 minutes
- Country: France
- Language: French

Immoral Tales (French: Contes immoraux) is a 1973 French anthology film directed by Walerian Borowczyk. The film was Borowczyk's most sexually explicit at the time. The film is split into four erotic-themed stories that involve the loss of virginity, masturbation, bloodlust, and incest.

== Plot ==
The film is separated into four stories:

- The first story involves André (Fabrice Luchini), who takes his 16-year-old cousin (played by Lise Danvers) to the beach to perform fellatio on him in tune to the waves of the incoming tide.
- The second story is titled 'Thérése the Philosopher', an adaptation of the 1748 novel of the same name. It involves a teenage country girl (Charlotte Alexandra) who intermingles sexual desires in her imagination with her dedication to Christ after being locked in her room.
- The third story features Elizabeth Báthory (Paloma Picasso) as a countess who murders young girls in order to gain eternal youth by bathing in their blood and a girl (Marie Forså) putting pearls inside her vagina.
- The final story involves the daughter of Pope Alexander VI, Lucrezia Borgia (Florence Bellamy), having sex with her male relatives.
- One more episode, La Bête (starring Sirpa Lane), was originally placed between the second and the third, but removed from the film in many countries, and later produced as a separate film.

== Production ==
By 1972, Walerian Borowczyk was known predominantly for his various short films which were made to support feature-length releases. Borowczyk's feature films had made very little income from their theatrical releases while short films were not in demand as much as supporting features in cinemas. At this time, Borowczyk met with producer Anatole Dauman, who suggested that because France's film censors had relaxed the laws concerning censorship, Borowczyk should make an erotic feature to gain an audience.

The film's stories are taken from various sources, including surrealist writers and poets. The first story in the film is taken from surrealist writer André Pieyre de Mandiargues. The title of the second story is taken from an anonymous sacrilegious novel from the 18th century. The third story is a re-telling of the case of Elizabeth Báthory from the study of surrealist poet Valentine Penrose.

A fifth story in the Immoral Tales was originally planned, but was taken out of the film and developed into the feature film La Bête (1975). Arrow Films released a version of the movie on physical media with the story added as the third tale.

30 gallons of real blood (from pigs) were used for the Countess Bathory's bath.

== Release ==
Immoral Tales was screened in Britain in September 1973 as an incomplete work. This version included the short film A Private Collection, The Tide and The Beast of Gévaudan. Immoral Tales was released in French theaters on August 28, 1974. The French film magazine Le Film français stated in 1974, 128 films that were classified as "erotic" were screened in Paris. This accounted for 16% of the total French box office. Immoral Tales sold 359,748 tickets, making it the second most popular release of these films, the most popular being Emmanuelle.

It was shown at the 17th Regus London Film Festival held in November and December 1973. The film won the London Festival Choice award at the festival.

Immoral Tales was shown at the 12th Kinoteka Polish Film Festival in London in May 2014.

== Reception ==
In 1974, Immoral Tales won the Prix de L'Âge d'or, an award intended to commemorate the spirit of surrealism. After the release of Immoral Tales, Borowczyk began to fall out of favor with film critics. New York Magazine wrote an unfavourable review, referring to the film as "episodic and disjointed, but also written with a great deal of stupidity" and describing the story-telling, directing, acting and photography in the film as "wretched."

Among modern reviews, AllMovie gave the film three stars out of five, feeling that first two stories did not work as well as the second two as well as saying that it was Borowczyk's move from "art house material and toward softcore; as such, the material displays its director's characteristic intelligence but lapses into exploitation a little too often." In an overview of Borowczyk's work in the film magazine Senses of Cinema, Immoral Tales is referred to as his weakest amongst his first five feature films and that "an unsensational approach to the material and detached gaze of the camera make it closer to a surrealist text than a pornographic movie." Dave Kehr wrote a review for the Chicago Reader praising that the film "contains some very elegant images" but compared it negatively to Borowczyk's followup The Story of Sin, which Kehr proclaimed "avoided the trap of superficiality by adopting an ironic mode. Here, he seems entirely too sincere—and more than a little dull."

In his 2014 review for The Guardian, Peter Bradshaw praises the film, citing the influence of Ken Russell and Pier Paolo Pasolini.

== See also ==
- List of French films of 1973
