= Henri Tisot =

French actor

Henri Tisot (1 June 1937 – 6 August 2011) was a French actor, writer, and humorist. He was best known for playing Adolf Hitler in the farcical film The Fuhrer Runs Amok, for his parodies of the speeches of General Charles de Gaulle, and for the television series La trilogie marseillaise.

Henri Tisot was born in La Seyne-sur-Mer. He died at the age of 74 in Sanary-sur-Mer, Var, France.

== Work ==
=== Film ===
- 1985 Hell Train
- 1983 Une jeunesse
- 1982 La baraka
- 1979 Charles and Lucie
- 1975 Maître Pygmalion
- 1974 Gross Paris
- 1974 The Fuhrer Runs Amok
- 1974 Le plumard en folie
- 1974 Le Lit... Ze Bawdy Bed
- 1973 The Edifying and Joyous Story of Colinot
- 1970 Happy He Who Like Ulysses
- 1969 Aux frais de la princesse
- 1969 Les gros malins
- 1965 Killer Spy
- 1963 Le roi du village
- 1963 Le temps des copains
- 1962 My Uncle from Texas
- 1962 The Devil and the Ten Commandments
- 1962 Tales of Paris
- 1961 La menace
- 1961 Les amours de Paris
- 1961 Lafayette
- 1959 Marriage of Figaro
- 1958 Would-Be Gentleman

=== Television ===
- 2000 La trilogie marseillaise: César (movie)
- 2000 La trilogie marseillaise: Fanny (movie)
- 2000 La trilogie marseillaise: Marius (movie)
- 1987 Série noire (series)
- 1986 Le dindon (movie)
- 1986 Cinéma 16 (series)
- 1985 La poudre aux yeux (movie)
- 1983 Vichy dancing (movie)
- 1982 L'australienne (movie)
- 1981 La scélérate Thérèse (movie)
- 1981 Les gaietés de la correctionnelle (series)
- 1981 Le cocu magnifique (movie)
- 1980 Vient de paraître (movie)
- 1979 Joséphine ou la comédie des ambitions (mini-series)
- 1979 La nuit de l'été (movie)
- 1971-1978 Au théâtre ce soir (series)
- 1976 Le milliardaire (movie)
- 1975 Les Zingari (series)
- 1973 Arsène Lupin (series)
- 1972 Le voleur de riens (movie)
- 1970 Les lettres de mon moulin (movie)
- 1969 D'Artagnan (mini-series)
- 1961-1962 Le temps des copains (series)
- 1961 Le théâtre de la jeunesse (series)
- 1960 Cyrano de Bergerac (movie)
- 1960 Les cinq dernières minutes (series)
- 1960 Rouge (movie)
- 1959 Le chandelier (movie)
