= Philippe Labro =

French author, journalist and film director (1936–2025)

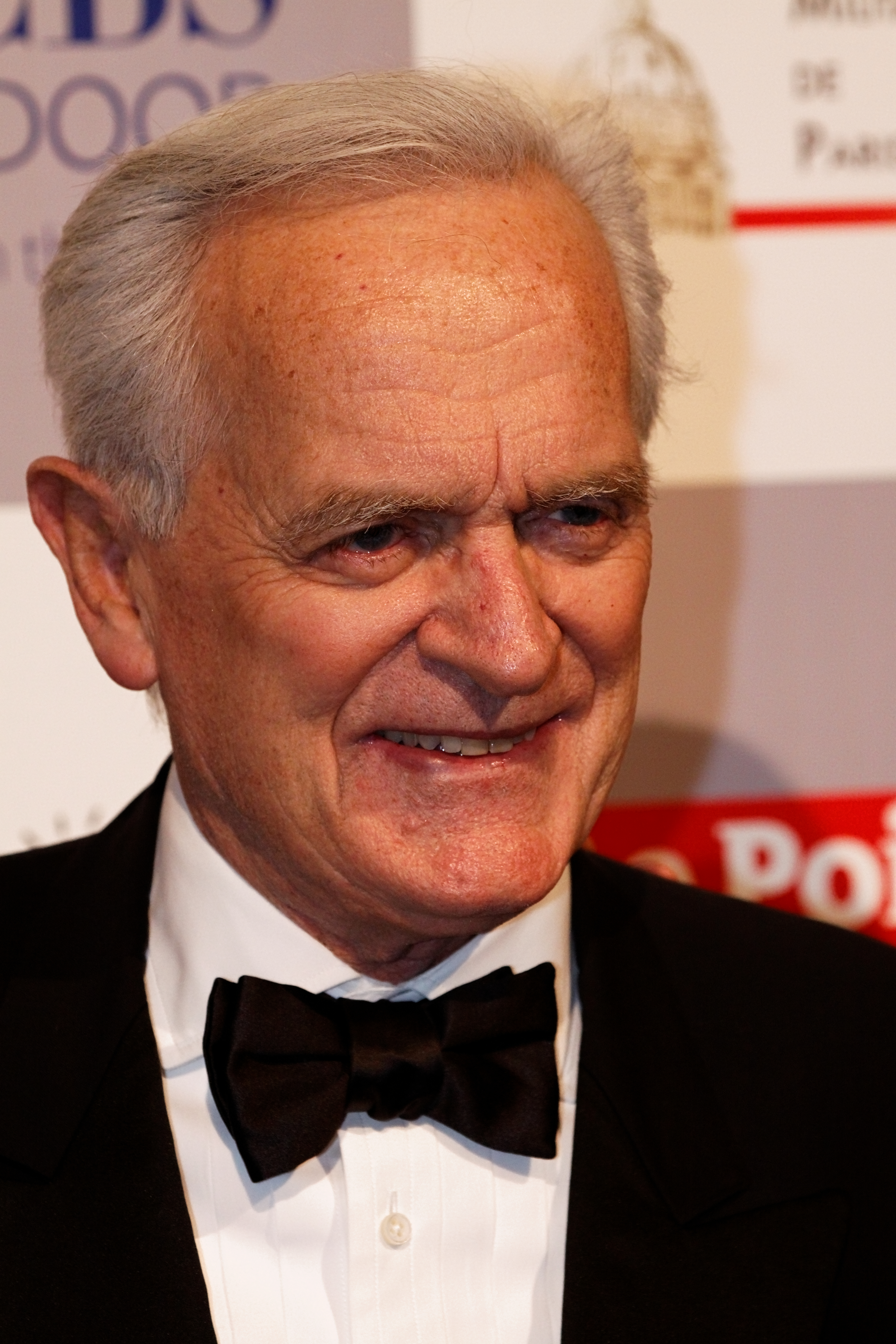
- Labro in 2012
- Born: 27 August 1936; Montauban, France
- Died: 4 June 2025 (aged 88); Paris, France
- Education: Washington and Lee University
- Occupations: Journalist; novelist; film director
- Employer: C8

Signature
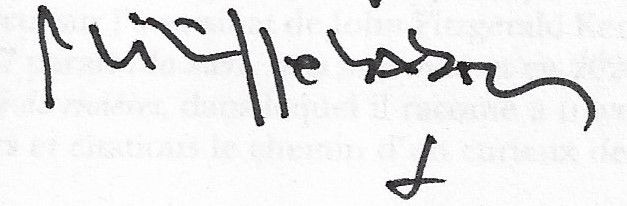

Philippe Labro (27 August 1936 – 4 June 2025) was a French author, journalist and film director. He worked for RTL, Paris Match, TF1, and Antenne 2. He received the Prix Interallié for his autobiography L'Étudiant étranger in 1986.

== Life and career ==
At the age of eighteen, Labro left France to study at Washington and Lee University in Virginia. He then travelled across the United States. On his return to Europe, he became a reporter. From 1960 to 1962, during the Algerian war, Labro was a member of the military. He then returned to his journalistic activities. While covering the assassination of John F. Kennedy for French newspaper France-Soir, he met Jack Ruby in Dallas days before he shot and killed Lee Harvey Oswald; he was thus subsequently officially interviewed by the Warren Commission. He wrote and directed many films and was a close friend of Jean-Pierre Melville, as he recalls in the 2008 documentary Code Name Melville. From 1985 to 2000, he was director of programmes at RTL becoming the vice president of the station in 1992.

In April 2010, he became Commander of the Légion d'honneur.

Labro died from cancer in Paris, on 4 June 2025, at the age of 88.

== Selected filmography ==
- Tout peut arriver - with Jean-Claude Bouillon and Catherine Allégret (1969)
- Without Apparent Motive – with Jean-Louis Trintignant (1971)
- The Inheritor – with Jean-Paul Belmondo (1973)
- Le Hasard et la Violence (Chance and Violence) – with Yves Montand and Katharine Ross (1974)
- The Hunter Will Get You – with Jean-Paul Belmondo (1976)
- La Crime (Cover Up) – with Claude Brasseur, Jean-Louis Trintignant and Jean-Claude Brialy (1983)
- Rive droite, rive gauche – with Gérard Depardieu, Nathalie Baye and Carole Bouquet (1984)

== Selected bibliography ==
- Un Américain peu tranquille (1960)
- Des feux mal éteints (1967)
- Ce n'est qu'un début (1968)
- Des bateaux dans la nuit (1982)
- Des cornichons au chocolat (1983)
- L'Étudiant étranger (1986)
- Un été dans l'Ouest (1988)
- Le Petit Garçon (1988)
- Quinze ans (1992)
- Un début à Paris (1994)
- La Traversée (1996)
- Rendez-vous au Colorado (1997)
- Manuella (1999)
- Je connais gens de toutes sortes (2002)
- Tomber sept fois, se relever huit (2003)
- Franz et Clara (2006)
- Les Gens (2009)
- 7 500 signes (2010)
- On a tiré sur le Président (2013)
- Le Flûtiste invisible (2013)
- Ma mère, cette inconnue (2017)
- J'irais nager dans plus de rivières (2020)
- Deux gimlets sur la 5ème avenue (2024)
