= Anne Kerylen =

French actress (1943–2021)

- Born: 6 December 1943; Paris, Vichy France
- Died: 23 March 2021 (aged 77)
- Occupation: Actress

Anne Kerylen (6 December 1943 – 23 March 2021) was a French actress who specialized in dubbing.

== Biography ==
Kerylen grew up with a distinguished passion for the theatre. In her adolescence, she acted in her first piece. She studied literature at the University of Lille upon the persistence of her parents. She then became a professor of Latin, French, and Greek. She then entered the Conservatoire de Lille and was an amateur theatre actress after her graduation. She subsequently moved to Paris to devote herself to television.

Kerylen grew some stardom after her appearance on the soap opera Les Gens de Mogador and the television program Au théâtre ce soir. From 1978 on, she mainly worked in dubbing. She dubbed over many American series, such as Charlie's Angels, Little House on the Prairie, Santa Barbara, The Young and the Restless, and others. She also worked as an artistic director for Dubbing Brothers and Télétota.

Anne Kerylen died on 23 March 2021 at the age of 77.

== Filmography ==
=== Cinema ===
- Pano ne passera pas (1969)
- Céleste (1970)
- I Am Frigid... Why? (1972)
- Tout bas (1974)
- Véronique ou l'été de mes 13 ans (1975)

=== Television ===
- La Brigade des maléfices (1971)
- Les Gens de Mogador (1972)
- Au théâtre ce soir (1974)
- La Famille Cigale (1977)
- Claire (1986)
- 1996 (1987)
- La Femme abandonnée (1992)
