= Charlotte Alexandra =

English actress

- Born: 19 November 1954 (age 71); England
- Occupation: Actress

Charlotte Alexandra Mary Seeley, usually credited as Charlotte Alexandra, is an English film actress. She is best known for her appearance in several controversial, sexually-explicit feature films in the mid- to late 1970s.

She has also acted under her given name Charlotte Seeley.

== Career ==
In 1973, Alexandra appeared in the film Contes immoraux (Immoral Tales), an erotica film directed by Walerian Borowczyk, and Les Baiseuses which was titled Jailbait or That Girl Is a Tramp in the US. In 1976, Alexandra had a starring role in Une vraie jeune fille which was directed and written by Catherine Breillat. Alexandra played the role of a 14-year-old girl who goes through a turbulent sexual awakening. In English-speaking countries, the film was called A Real Young Girl in the US and A Real Young Lady in the UK. The film was not released until 1999 due to its graphic depiction of sexuality, including explicit close-ups of Alexandra's vulva.

In 1976, she also appeared in the film L'Acrobate, a comedy-drama directed by Jean-Daniel Pollet. In 1977, she appeared in Goodbye Emmanuelle and The Strange Case of the End of Civilization as We Know It, and her later films included Spookies and Personal Services under the name Charlotte Seeley.

She appeared as Georgina Marshall (wife to Paul Nicholas' character Vince Pinner) in the third & final series of Just Good Friends, originally broadcast in 1986.

== Filmography ==
=== Film ===
Year	Title	Role	Notes
1972	Les baiseuses	La surveillante de la maison de correction	Pornographic film
1973	Immoral Tales	Thérèse	
1976	L'acrobate	Louise	
1976	A Real Young Girl	Alice Bonnard	
1977	The Strange Case of the End of Civilization as We Know It	Miss Moneypacket	
1977	Goodbye Emmanuelle	Chloe	
1977	The Fortune Teller		Short film
1979	The Knowledge	Housewife	credited as Charlotte Seely, TV movie
1985	Dead End	Tina	
1986	Spookies	Adrienne	credited as Charlotte Seeley
1987	Personal Services	Diane	

=== Television ===
Year	Title	Role	Notes
1986	Just Good Friends	Georgina	4 episodes, credited as Charlotte Seeley
1986	Lytton's Diary	Valerie von Wolfenberg	Episode: "The Ends and the Means", credited as Charlotte Seely
1987	Tandoori Nights	Yuppie	Episode: "Sage Struck", credited as Charlotte Seely
