= Jeanne Goupil =

French actress (born 1950)

Jeanne Goupil (born April 4, 1950) is a French television and film actress from Soisy-sous-Montmorency who is known for the Don't Deliver Us from Evil (1971), Cookies (1975) and The Grocer's Son (2007).

== Filmography ==
- You Can't Hold Back Spring (1971)
- Don't Deliver Us from Evil (1971)
- Charlie et ses deux nénettes (1973)
- Cookies (1975)
- Marie, the Doll (1976)
- The Bait (1995)
- The Grocer's Son (2007)
