= Without Apparent Motive =

- Sans mobile apparent
- Directed by: Philippe Labro
- Screenplay by: Philippe Labro; Jacques Lanzmann
- Based on: Ten Plus One by Ed McBain
- Produced by: Jacques-Éric Strauss
- Starring: Jean-Louis Trintignant; Carla Gravina; Jean-Pierre Marielle; Dominique Sanda
- Cinematography: Jean Penzer
- Edited by: Claude Barrois; Nicole Saunier
- Music by: Ennio Morricone
- Production companies: Cinétel; Président Films; Euro International Film
- Distributed by: Valoria Films
- Release dates: September 15, 1971 (France); December 22, 1971 (Italy)
- Running time: 100 minutes
- Countries: France; Italy
- Language: French

Without Apparent Motive (French: Sans mobile apparent) is a 1971 thriller film directed by Philippe Labro and adapted from the 1963 novel Ten Plus One by Ed McBain. Set in Nice, it tells the story of a police detective faced with a series of unexplained killings of apparently unconnected people by a mystery sniper.

== Plot ==
Unmarried police detective Carella sees Jocelyne, a sexy old flame who is being trailed by an Englishman. Any thoughts of taking up with her again are put aside because he has to investigate the assassination by a single shot from a long-range 0.22 rifle of Forest, a prominent local businessman. The widow is no help but the man's stepdaughter Sandra mentions an associate Barroyer, who later that day is killed in exactly the same way. Sandra also finds her stepfather's secret diary, which among many trysts recorded a steamy night with Jocelyne. Next day, Carella asks Jocelyne round to his flat and she is shot dead on the steps outside. He has learned that both Forest and Barroyer smuggled money through an astrologer and drug dealer called Kleinberg, who is shot later that day. After four deaths in two days, Carella's boss is frantic. Though the police have linked the victims to money laundering, narcotics, and prostitution, nothing adds up to a motive for murdering them.

Sandra gives them a big clue, as she knows two men who were at university with the four victims, one is a TV presenter called Sabirnou and the other a theatre director called Palombo. Both are brought in for questioning and a picture emerges. With two women whose present married names are unknown, as students all were in the cast of a play together. Why this should lead to their deaths remains unknown until next day, one of the two unknown women, Hélène, approaches the police. She reveals to Carella that the end of run party degenerated into a mass sex orgy and that when Juliette, the other unknown woman, refused to join in she was gang raped. It remains to find Juliette, which happens next day when her husband rings the police. Arriving to take her in for questioning, Carella is shot at by a long-range rifle and, returning fire, he wounds the sniper. When he rushes into the building, he finds his assailant was her English husband, who has been systematically tracking down and killing all those involved in her rape.

== Cast ==
- Jean-Louis Trintignant as Stéphane Carella
- Carla Gravina as Jocelyne Rocca
- Laura Antonelli as Juliette Vaudreuil
- Jean-Pierre Marielle as Perry Rupert Foote
- Dominique Sanda as Sandra Forest
- Sacha Distel as Julien Sabirnou
- Stéphane Audran as Hélène Vallée
- Paul Crauchet as Francis Palombo
- Erich Segal as Hans Kleinberg

== Production ==
Without Apparent Motive was a French and Italian co-production between the Paris-based companies Cinétel and Président Films and the Rome-based Euro International Film Euro Intertnaional provided 30% of the budget of 3.5 million francs.

The screenplay was adapted by Philippe Labro, Jacques Lanzmann, and Vincenzo Labella, from Ten Plus One, a police procedural novel by Ed McBain. Detective Steve Carella in Ed McBain's novel was renamed Stéphane Carella in the French version.

== Release ==
Without Apparent Motive was released in France on September 15, 1971 as Sans mobile apparent. It performed well in France with over 1,290,000 spectators during its theatrical run. It was released in Italy as Senza movente on December 22, 1971 where it grossed 979,884,400 Italian lire.

Without Apparent Motive was released theatrically in the United States on February 19, 1972. It was released on blu-ray by Vinegar Syndrome on July 28, 2026.

== Reception ==
TV Guide called it "a deft thriller in the hardboiled tradition of Raymond Chandler and Dashiell Hammett", and said that "Labro slowly builds up a feeling of impending doom, holding the mystery's solution until the very end and maintaining a consistent mood."
