= Catherine Wagener =

French actress (1952–2011)

Catherine Gisèle Jeanne Wagener
- Born: 2 June 1951; Paris, France
- Died: 3 May 2011 (aged 59); Paris, France
- Occupation: Actress

Catherine Gisèle Jeanne Wagener (2 June 1951 – 3 May 2011) was a French actress from Paris, known for the Don't Deliver Us from Evil (1971), Les Glaces (1973), and I Am Frigid... Why? (1972).

== Filmography ==
- Les risques du métier (1967)
- Désirella (1970)
- Don't Deliver Us from Evil (1971)
- I Am Frigid... Why? (1972)

=== Television ===
- Les Glaces (1973)
