= Ligia Borowczyk =

Polish actress (1932–2022)

- Born: 7 December 1932; Krasnystaw, Poland
- Died: 6 September 2022 (aged 89); Warsaw, Poland
- Education: AST National Academy of Theatre Arts in Kraków; Aleksander Zelwerowicz National Academy of Dramatic Art in Warsaw; Łódź Film School
- Occupation: Actress

Ligia Borowczyk (7 December 1932 – 6 September 2022) was a Polish actress.

== Life and career ==
Borowczyk was married to film director Walerian Borowczyk and held roles in some of his earlier films, including Goto, Island of Love and Blanche. She made an appearance in the Chris Marker film La Jetée.

Borowczyk died in Warsaw on 6 September 2022, at the age of 89.

== Filmography ==
Year	Title	Role	Notes
1957	Zimowy zmierzch	Celinka	
1957	Spotkania	Maja	
1959	The Astronauts	Woman at the window	Short
1962	La Jetée	A woman from the future	
1969	Goto, Island of Love	Glossia	
1971	Kamizelka	Anna	TV Movie
1971	Blanche	Blanche	
1978	Behind Convent Walls	Sister Clara	(final film role)
