= Hiram Keller =

American actor (1944–1997)

- Born: Hiram Keller Undercofler Jr. May 3, 1944; Moody Field, Georgia, U.S.
- Died: January 20, 1997 (aged 52); Atlanta, Georgia, U.S.
- Other names: Hyram Keller; The Face; Rusty; Rusty Underkoffer
- Occupations: Actor; model
- Spouse: Kristina St. Clair (m. 1981; div. 1987)
- Children: 1

Hiram Keller (born Hiram Keller Undercofler Jr.; May 3, 1944 – January 20, 1997), nicknamed "The Face", was an American actor and model. Keller was an actor in the original line-up Broadway production of Hair, but he is best known for his role as Ascyltus (credited as Ascilto) in Federico Fellini's 1969 film Satyricon. His professional career spanned around 14 years. He also worked as a runway and print model and acted in the New York underground scene with Andy Warhol.

== Early life and education ==
Hiram Keller Undercofler Jr. was born to Hiram Keller Undercofler Sr. and Flora Gatewood in Moody Field, Georgia on May 3, 1944. His father was a lieutenant in the United States Army Air Corps before becoming the Chief Justice of the Supreme Court of Georgia.

Keller studied law at the University of Georgia before dropping out and moving to Palm Beach, Florida, where he worked as a window designer. After a vacation in California, he moved to New York to live with an uncle.

== Career ==
In 1966, Keller attended classes taught by Stella Adler at Lee Strasberg's Actors Studio at Carnegie Hall. "I sat in on a lot of classes and I really couldn't get into it. It just wasn't my cup of tea," he said. He did not adopt Adler's method acting style. "If you tell a producer you're a Method actor, he doesn't want to know you ... It costs a fortune to work with Method actors. It's very tedious, and very long."

Keller dated actress Monique van Vooren. Initially, he used the stage name Rusty Underkoffer, changing to Hiram Keller. When Monique invested in the original production of Hair in 1968, she asked producer Michael Butler to put Keller in the cast. Keller was a member of "the tribe, a group of politically active, long-haired hippies of the 'Age of Aquarius' living a bohemian life in New York City and fighting against conscription into the Vietnam War. Hiram was the first male "nudie" on Broadway, which caused controversy.

Keller and his Hair co-star Emmaretta Marks appeared on the cover of the November 1969 issue of After Dark for a special feature on erotica.

Keller caught the attention of Italian filmmaker Franco Zeffirelli, who gave his picture to Italian director Federico Fellini. Fellini invited him to fly out to Rome for an audition and cast him in the role of Ascyltus in his surreal adaptation of the surviving portions of Gaius Petronius's work of fiction Satyricon. In describing the character Ascyltus, Keller said: "He's vulgar. He lived for his own self-satisfaction. He's a product of the time. He's me." This role boosted Keller's career internationally. Fellini's long-time employee and screenwriter Bernardino Zapponi wrote of Keller's representation:"[He] has a very photogenic smile and is full of knowledge as required by his role."

After this success, Keller received major roles in the European film market. He had the leading role in the Greek motion picture Orestis (1969), in 1970 he appeared with John Phillip Law in Strogoff, an Italian-French-German-Bulgarian co-production based on Jules Verne's Michel Strogoff; two years later, he starred with Giancarlo Giannini in Alberto Lattuada's comedy Sono stato io and had the male lead role opposite Jane Birkin in the Antonio Margheriti-directed horror movie Seven Deaths in the Cat's Eye. In 1973, Keller had the opportunity to play the role of Jean, L'ange in Marcel Carné's La Merveilleuse Visite however he lost the role to Gilles Kohler after failing to fulfill the obligations in his contract to learn French. In 1975, he had the main role in the science fiction thriller Lifespan, with Tina Aumont and Klaus Kinski, followed by Catherine Breillat's A Real Young Girl (1976). He appeared in 1974 in two productions for Italian television, Miklós Jancsó's historical drama Roma rivoule Cesare and in the series Orlando furioso, based on Ludovico Ariosto's epic poem.

Keller and his Satyricon co-star Donyale Luna appeared on the cover of the October 1974 issue of Interview magazine.

In 1982, Keller starred with his wife, at the time, Kristina St. Clair in the cult Jamaican production Countryman, his last film.

== Personal life ==
Keller was bisexual. Among those he was involved with was actress Monique van Vooren, ballet dancer Rudolf Nureyev, actress Talitha Getty, film director Wallace Potts and Warhol superstar Jackie Curtis.

He learnt to speak basic Italian while living in Europe.

He was married to actress Kristina St. Clair from 1981 to 1987 and had a daughter named Serena Keller Undercofler, also known as Cole Keller Undercofler, who works in the film industry as a music supervisor.

His last years were spent with his family in Atlanta, Georgia.

== Death ==
Keller died of liver cancer at age 52 in Atlanta, Fulton County, Georgia, on January 20, 1997. His resting place is located at the Oak Grove Cemetery in Americus, Georgia.

== Filmography ==
- 1969 Fellini Satyricon - Ascilto
- 1969 Fellinikon - Himself
- 1969 Orestis - Orestis
- 1970 Ciao, Federico! - Himself
- 1970 Strogoff (The Courier of the Czar) - Ivan Ogareff
- 1972 La notte dei fiori - Hiram
- 1972 Grazie signore p... - Marco Rossetti
- 1972 Smile Before Death - Paolo - Dorothy's Lover
- 1972 Rosina Fumo viene in città... per farsi il corredo - Francesco
- 1973 Sono stato io - Kid
- 1973 Seven Deaths in the Cat's Eye - Lord James MacGrieff
- 1974 Roma rivuole Cesare (for TV) - Ottavio
- 1974 Orlando furioso (for TV) - Brandimarte
- 1974 Noa Noa - Fletcher Christian
- 1975 Lifespan - Dr. Ben Land
- 1976 A Real Young Girl - Pierre-Evariste Renard / "Jim" / "Earthworm Jim"
- 1982 Countryman - Bobby Lloyd
