= I Am Frigid... Why? =

- Directed by: Max Pécas
- Written by: Max Pécas
- Produced by: Max Pécas
- Starring: Sandra Julien; Marie-Georges Pascal
- Cinematography: Robert Lefebvre
- Edited by: Michel Pécas
- Music by: Derry Hall
- Release date: 22 March 1973
- Running time: 99 minutes
- Country: France
- Language: French

I Am Frigid... Why? (French: Je suis frigide... pourquoi ?) is a 1972 French erotic film directed by Max Pécas.

== Plot ==
After being initiated by force by Eric and Carla, incestuous brother and sister, Doris tries to overcome her trauma living various sexual experiences...

== Cast ==
- Sandra Julien : Doris
- Marie-Georges Pascal : Carla Chambon
- Jean-Luc Terrade : Eric Chambon
- Thierry Murzeau : Luc, Doris's lover
- Robert Lombard : Mr Chambom
- Arlette Poirier : Mrs Chambon
- Georges Guéret : Doris's father
- Anne Kerylen : Eva
- Catherine Wagener : Léa
- Virginie Vignon : Patricia
- Frédérique Aubrée : Lina
- Joëlle Cœur : Girl at the party

== Bibliography ==
- Dictionnaire des films français pornographiques et érotiques en 16 et 35 mm, Serious Publishing 2011, Christophe Bier
