= Good Little Girls =

1971 film by Jean-Claude Roy

- Original poster
- Directed by: Jean-Claude Roy
- Written by: François de Bernis
- Produced by: Louis Duchesne
- Starring: Marie-Georges Pascal; Michèle Girardon; Bella Darvi
- Cinematography: Claude Saunier
- Edited by: Florence Eymon; Marcel Teulade
- Music by: Maurice Lecœur
- Release date: 5 May 1971
- Running time: 95 minutes
- Country: France
- Language: French

Good Little Girls (French: Les Petites Filles modèles) is a 1971 French film directed by Jean-Claude Roy. The movie is a pastiche of Countess of Ségur's novel Les Petites Filles modèles matching comedy and erotism.

== Plot ==
In the early 1970s, the Countess of Ségur's heroines have grown up. They are now teenagers with the usual preoccupations of their age. In the area of Fleurville the good little girls (and their mothers) feel something is missing, which their girlish games cannot really fulfil; "a lack of men ..."

== Cast ==
- Jessica Dorn : Madeleine de Fleurville
- Marie-Georges Pascal : Camille de Fleurville
- Cathy Reghin : Marguerite de Rosbourg
- Sylvie Lafontaine : Sophie
- Michèle Girardon : Madame de Fleurville
- Bella Darvi : Madame de Rosbourg
- Béatrice Arnac : Madame Fichini
- François Guérin : doctor Luçon
- Nicole Isimat : Elise, the maid
- Pierre Moncorbier : Nicaise, the servant
- Vincent Gauthier : Julien, the yogi
- Romain Bouteille : Courpied
- Jean Franval : Pinko, the painter
- Dominique Paturel : Narrator (voice only)

== DVD releases ==
DVD released in the UK in 2011 by Nucleus Films (French with English subtitles)

== Bibliography ==
- Christophe Bier, Dictionnaire des films français pornographiques et érotiques en 16 et 35 mm (Serious Publishing, 2011)
