= Victims of Vice =

1978 film by Jacques Scandelari

- Directed by: Jacques Scandelari
- Written by: Pierre Germont; Jacques Robert; Jacques Scandelari
- Starring: Patrice Valota; Odile Michel; Marie-Georges Pascal
- Cinematography: François About
- Edited by: Pierre-Alain Beauchard
- Music by: Marc Cerrone
- Release date: 2 August 1978 (France)
- Running time: 80 minutes
- Country: France
- Language: French

Victims of Vice (French: Brigade mondaine) is a 1978 French film directed by Jacques Scandelari based on Michel Brice's novel edited by Gérard de Villiers.

== Cast ==
- Patrice Valota: inspector Boris Corentin
- Odile Michel: Micheline
- Florence Cayrol: Annie
- Marie-Georges Pascal: Peggy
- Patrick Olivier: Patrick Morel
- Jacques Berthier: Paul-Henri Vaugoubert de Saint-Loup
- Marianne Comtell: Nada
- Jacques Dacqmine: chief of police
- Jean-Pol Brissart: inspector Brichot
- Gisèle Grimm: Mrs. Pandolini
- Hélène Hily: mother of the victim
- Philippe Castelli: headwaiter
