= Surprise Sock =

1978 film

- Directed by: Jean-François Davy
- Written by: Jean-François Davy; Jean-Claude Carrière
- Produced by: Jean-François Davy
- Starring: Anna Karina
- Cinematography: Jacques Guérin
- Edited by: Thierry Derocles
- Music by: Marie-Paule Belle
- Distributed by: Compagnie Commerciale Française Cinématographique (CCFC); Groupement des Editeurs de Films (GEF)
- Release date: 1978
- Running time: 96 minutes
- Country: France
- Language: French

Surprise Sock (French: Chaussette surprise) is a 1978 French comedy film directed by Jean-François Davy and starring Anna Karina.

== Cast ==
- Bernadette Lafont – Bernadette
- Anna Karina – Nathalie
- Christine Pascal – Juliette
- Rufus – Antoine
- Michel Galabru – L'obsédé de la télévision
- Bernard Haller – Bernard
- Bernard Le Coq – Raphaël
- Claude Piéplu – Doctor
- Agnès Soral – Charlotte
- Marcel Dalio – Monsieur L'église
- Henri Guybet – Assistant
- Micha Bayard – Nurse
- Didier Sauvegrain – Luc
- Jean-Claude Carrière – Fournier
- Michel Blanc – The intern
- Lucien Jeunesse – L'animateur du jeu TV
