= Sandra Julien =

French actress (born 1950)

- Born: Sandra Calaputti; 14 February 1950 (age 75); Toulon, France
- Other names: Sandra Jullien
- Occupation: Actress
- Years active: 1970–1975
- Spouse: Pierre Julien

Sandra Julien (born Sandra Calaputti 14 February 1950 in Toulon, France) is a French actress. Her acting career only lasted a few years, but one of the films she is remembered for is Le Frisson des Vampires (The Shiver of the Vampires), a film by director Jean Rollin.

== Career ==
Julien's acting career only lasted about five years. She got her first role in Le Frisson des Vampires in 1970, and that was her only time working with director Jean Rollin. Rollin had also worked with her husband, Pierre Julien. She mainly appeared in erotic films. Max Pécas gave her the leading role in I Am a Nymphomaniac and in I Am Frigid... Why?, opposite Marie-Georges Pascal. She left the sets after the advent of hardcore pornography.

== Filmography ==
Film
Year	Title	Role	Notes
1970	Le Frisson des Vampires	Isle	other titles - The Shiver of the Vampires; Strange Things Happen at Night
1971	Atout Sexe		
1971	Je Suis une Nymphomane	Carole	other titles - Libido: The Urge to Love; Forbidden Passion; Libido; The Sensuous Teenager; The Urge to Love
1972	Gendai Porno-den: Senten-sei Inpu		
1972	Tokugawa Sekkusu(sex) Kinshi-rei: Shikijô Daimyô	French Slave	
1972	Dany la Ravageuse	Dany	other title - Dany the Ravager
1972	L'étrangleur		other title - The Strangler
1973	Je Suis Frigide... Pourquoi?	Doris	other titles - I Am Frigid... Why?, Let Me Love You
1973	Les Gourmandines	Sandra	other title - Three into Sex Won't Go
1974	Le Permis de Conduire	Nathalie, la Séductrice	
1974	Nada		other title - The Nada Gang
1974	La Maison des Filles Perdues	Magda	other title - The House of the Lost Dolls
1975	Les Filles du Golden Saloon	Molly	other title - The Girls of the Golden Saloon
1975	Rêves Pornos		archive footage
