= Bananes mécaniques =

1973 film by Jean-François Davy

- Directed by: Jean-François Davy
- Written by: Jean-François Davy
- Starring: Marie-Georges Pascal; Anne Libert; Pauline Larrieu
- Cinematography: Roger Fellous
- Edited by: Claude Cohen; Christel Micha
- Music by: Raymond Ruer
- Distributed by: SND
- Release date: 19 July 1973
- Running time: 90 minutes
- Country: France
- Language: French

Bananes mécaniques is a 1973 French erotic comedy directed by Jean-François Davy.

== Plot ==
When summer comes, five young, pretty and penniless women decide to squat at the villa of one of their fathers who's gone for holidays. The girls just want to have fun and the place could looks like heaven for a man who would join in,

== Cast ==
- Marie-Georges Pascal: Marie-Georges
- Anne Libert: Anne, the starlet
- Pauline Larrieu: Pauline
- Elisabeth Drancourt: Elisabeth
- Marie-Claire Davy: Marie-Claire
- Philippe Gasté: François
- Patrice Pascal: the young woodcutter
- Patrice Valota: Marc
- Christine Laurent: Juliette (uncredited)
- Antoine Marin: the mayor of the village
- Paul Pavel: the grocer of the village
- Pierre Forget: Pauline's father
- Jacques Robiolles: the hippie
- Christel Micha: young mistress of Pauline's father (uncredited)
- Jean-François Davy: Babette's friend (uncredited)
