= Jacques Scandelari =

Jacques Scandelari (July 5, 1943 in Dinard, France – June 2, 1999 in Paris, France) was a French film director, screenwriter and producer. He also produced gay pornographic films, under the pseudonym Marvin Merkins.

== Career ==
Jacques Scandelari gained notoriety for his second film Beyond Love and Evil that was loosely adapted from Marquis de Sade’s play Philosophy in the Bedroom. Set in the present day, a cult of depraved hedonists cavort at a remote, elegant mansion. Scandelari often chose the topic of sex, exploring connected themes such as Isolation and social alienation.

== New York ==
In 1977, Scandelari moved to New York City, where he produced the now famous gay pornographic film New York City Inferno. The film is notorious for its grim, documentary-style and its authorized use of songs of the Village People. In 1978 he worked together with La Grande Bouffe actress Florence Giorgetti in the bleak exploitation movie Flashing Lights.

== Filmography ==
Year	Film	
Year	Film	Notes
1969	Beyond Love and Evil	
1971	Macédoine	
1977	Homologues ou La soif du mâle	Credited as Marvin Merkins; released in English as Man's Country
1978	New York City Inferno	Credited as Marvin Merkins; released in English as From Paris to New York
1978	Flashing Lights	alternately titled Monique and New York After Midnight
1978	Victims of Vice	
1978	Un couple moderne	Credited as Marvin Merkins
