= Jean-Claude Roy =

French film director, producer and screenwriter

- Born: June 7, 1933; Boulogne-Billancourt, Hauts-de-Seine, France
- Died: August 7, 2018 (aged 85); Paris, France
- Occupations: Director, Writer, Producer
- Years active: 1955-1991 (film)

Jean-Claude Roy (June 7, 1933 – August 7, 2018) was a French film director, producer and screenwriter. He was sometimes credited as Patrick Aubin.

== Selected filmography ==
- A Night at the Moulin Rouge (1957)
- Good Little Girls (1971)

== Bibliography ==
- Peter Cowie & Derek Elley. World Filmography: 1967. Fairleigh Dickinson University Press, 1977.
