= Marie-Georges Pascal =

French actress (1946–1985)

- Marie-Georges Pascal in Les Raisins de la Mort
- Born: Marie-Georges Charlotte Faisy; October 2, 1946; Cambrai, France
- Died: November 9, 1985 (aged 39); Paris, France
- Occupation: Actress
- Years active: 1970–1985
- Notable work: Good Little Girls; Le Dessous du ciel D'Artagnan Amoureux; Les Raisins de la Mort

Marie-Georges Pascal (born Marie-Georges Charlotte Faisy; October 2, 1946 – November 9, 1985) was a French film, television and theatre actress.

== Early life ==
Marie-Georges Pascal was born in Cambrai in northern France. She later described her childhood as "very hard" and " very sad". Her parents, who dreamed of seeing her becoming a concert artist, forced her to spend her days playing the piano. At the age of sixteen, after the death of her mother and her father's remarriage, she left home and got a job as a model.

== Career ==
=== On screen ===
She made her debut in 1971, appearing in Jean-Claude Roy's French classic Les Petites Filles modèles, in which she played one of the lead roles alongside Jessica Dorn, Cathy Reghin, Michele Girardon and Bella Darvi.

From 1972 to early 1973 she performed six erotic films including Je suis frigide... pourquoi? with Sandra Julien, German film Hausfrauen Report international, Bananes mécaniques, with Anne Libert, Pauline Larrieu, Philippe Gasté and Patrice Valota, Quand Les Filles se Déchaînent, Les Infidèles and Les confidences érotiques d'un lit trop accueillant, with Olga Georges-Picot.

In 1973, she received roles in comedy films, L'Historie Très Bonne et Très Joyeuse de Colinot Trousse-Chemise, with Brigitte Bardot and Gross Paris, and in a drama La Rage au poing, alongside Tony Gatlif.

In 1974, she received the leading role in Le Dessous du ciel, playing a young woman passionate for parachuting. Mixing adventure and romance, the series was a success and substantially increased her popularity in France. The series is well received in countries such as Germany, thanks to Pierre Brice's presence in the cast. Her next television credits include leading roles in drama series, Les Pilotes de courses, La Vie des autres and a part in an episode of the long-running crime series Les Cinq Dernières Minutes. Pascal has also starred in television films and mini-series like D'Artagnan Amoureux.

In other countries such as the United States and United Kingdom, she is best known for playing the lead role as Élisabeth in the 1978 Jean Rollin classic horror Les Raisins de la Mort, in which Rollin himself said she was very "moving" and that "she made her character's descent into madness is extremely real". The same year, she also appeared in Brigade Mondaine, an adaptation of a novel edited by Gérard de Villiers with a soundtrack by Marc Cerrone. During the 1980s she appeared in two films, Cauchemar and Flics de choc with Mylène Demongeot, which was her final film.

=== On stage ===
Robert Hossein gave her the opportunity to make her debut on stage in 1970 in an adaptation of Georges Simenon's novel La Neige était sale. In 1972, she showed off various skills in the musical Madame Pauline. Then she played both in comedies and dramas.

She played in Marc Camoletti's success of Boulevard theatre Duos sur canapé (1974) and Boeing-Boeing (1976), Eugène Labiche's classical Vaudeville The Italian Straw Hat (1980), Molière's Les Femmes Savantes (1979) and Jean Anouilh's Le Nombril (1983).

She also played dramatic characters like Chimène in Corneille's Le Cid (1975), Ismene in Anouilh's Antigone (1975-1976), Jeanie in Henry Miller's Just wild about Harry (1977), Estelle Rigault in Jean-Paul Sartre's No Exit (1982) and Germaine Lechat in Octave Mirbeau's Business is business (1985).

== Death ==
Marie-Georges Pascal died in Paris at the age of 39. The apparent cause of her death was suicide.

== Filmography ==
Film
Year	Title	Role	Notes
1971	Les petites filles modèles	Camille de Fleurville	
1972	Je suis frigide... pourquoi?	Carla Chambon	
1973	Hausfrauen Report international	Janine	
1973	Les infidèles	Une fille chez Sophie	
1973	Bananes mécaniques	Marie-Georges	
1973	Les confidences érotiques d'un lit trop accueillant	Noëlle	
1973	L'histoire très bonne et très joyeuse de Colinot Trousse-Chemise	A Bather	
1974	Quand les filles se déchaînent	Mylène	
1974	Gross Paris		
1975	La rage au poing	Christine	
1978	Les raisins de la mort (The Grapes of Death)	Élisabeth	
1978	Brigade mondaine	Peggy	
1980	Cauchemar	Lydia	
1983	Flics de choc	L'assistante de la 'Maîtresse'	

Television
Year	Title	Role	Notes
1972	La Mort d'un champion	Maria Chamart	TV movie
1974	Le Dessous du ciel	Joëlle Gavarnier	
1975	Pilotes de courses	Brigitte Ducel	
1976	Le Milliardaire	Cécile Fabre-Simmons	TV movie
1977	D'Artagnan amoureux	Julie de Colineau du Val	Miniseries
1977	Mini-chroniques de René Goscinny	The dream girl	Episode: "La Croisière"
1978	Quand flambait le bocage	Mme de Montsorbier	TV movie
1979	Par-devant notaire	Minouche	Episode: "La Résidence du bonheur"
1979	Mme de Sévigné: Idylle familiale avec Bussy-Rabutin	Louise de Bussy	TV movie
1980	La Vie des autres	Audrey Caldwell	Episode: "Le Scandale"
1981	La Double Vie de Théophraste Longuet	Jane de Montfort	Miniseries
1983	Les cinq dernières minutes	Lydie Vignal	Episode: "Rouge Marine"

=== Archive footage ===
- 1975: Rêves pornos / Le Dictionnaire de l'érotisme, directed by Max Pécas (edited from Je Suis Frigide...Pourquoi?) ... Carla
- 1999: Eurotika !, documentary television series directed by Andy Stark and Pete Tombs : Episodes: Vampires and Virgins: The Films of Jean Rollin (edited from Les Raisins de la Mort), Is there a Doctor in the House: Medicine gone bad (edited from Je Suis Frigide...Pourquoi?), I am a Nymphomaniac: Erotic Films of Max Pécas (edited from Je Suis Frigide...Pourquoi?)
- 2007: La Nuit des horloges, directed by Jean Rollin (edited from Les Raisins de la Mort) .. Élisabeth
- 2007: Secret Cinema (Das geheime Kino), short directed by Michael Wolf (edited from Les Raisins de la mort)
- 2008: Spark of Life, short directed by Mike Bazanele (edited from Les Raisins de la mort)
- 2008: Grindhouse Universe, (trailer of Les Petites Filles modèles)
- 2011: Jean Rollin, le rêveur égaré, documentary directed by Damien Dupont and Yvan Pierre-Kaiser (edited from Les Raisins de la mort)
- 2015: Jean Rollin, être et à voir, documentary directed by Jean-Loup Martin (edited from Les Raisins de la mort)

== Theatre ==
- 1970 : La Neige était sale (Frédéric Dard and Georges Simenon, directed by Robert Hossein) ... Minna
- 1972 : La Maison de Zaza (musical by Darry Cowl from Gaby Bruyère's play) ... Fleur-de-Pêcher
- 1974 : Duos sur canapé (Marc Camoletti, directed by Marc Camoletti) ... Bubble
- 1975 : Le Cid (Pierre Corneille, directed by Michel Le Royer) ... Chimène
- 1975 : Antigone (Jean Anouilh, directed by Nicole Anouilh) ... Ismene
- 1976 : Boeing-Boeing (Marc Camoletti, directed by Christian-Gérard) ... Judith
- 1977 : Just wild about Harry (Henry Miller, directed by François Joxe) ... Jeanie
- 1978 : Boeing-Boeing (Marc Camoletti, directed by Christian-Gérard) ... Judith
- 1979 : Les Femmes Savantes (Molière, directed by Jean Térensier) ...
- 1979 : Boeing-Boeing (Marc Camoletti, directed by Christian-Gérard) ... Judith
- 1980 : Duos sur canapé (Marc Camoletti, directed by Marc Camoletti) ... Bubble
- 1980 : Soir de grève (Odile Ehret, directed by Virgil Tanase) ... the woman
- 1981 : The Italian Straw Hat (Eugène Marin Labiche and Marc-Michel, directed by Guy Kayat) ... Hélène
- 1982 : No Exit (Jean-Paul Sartre, directed by Georges Wilson) ... Estelle Rigault
- 1983 : Le Nombril (Jean Anouilh, directed by Jean Anouilh and Roland Piétri) ... Joséphine
- 1985 : Business is business (Octave Mirbeau, directed by Pierre Dux) ... Germaine Lechat
