= Jean-François Davy =

French film producer (1945–2025)

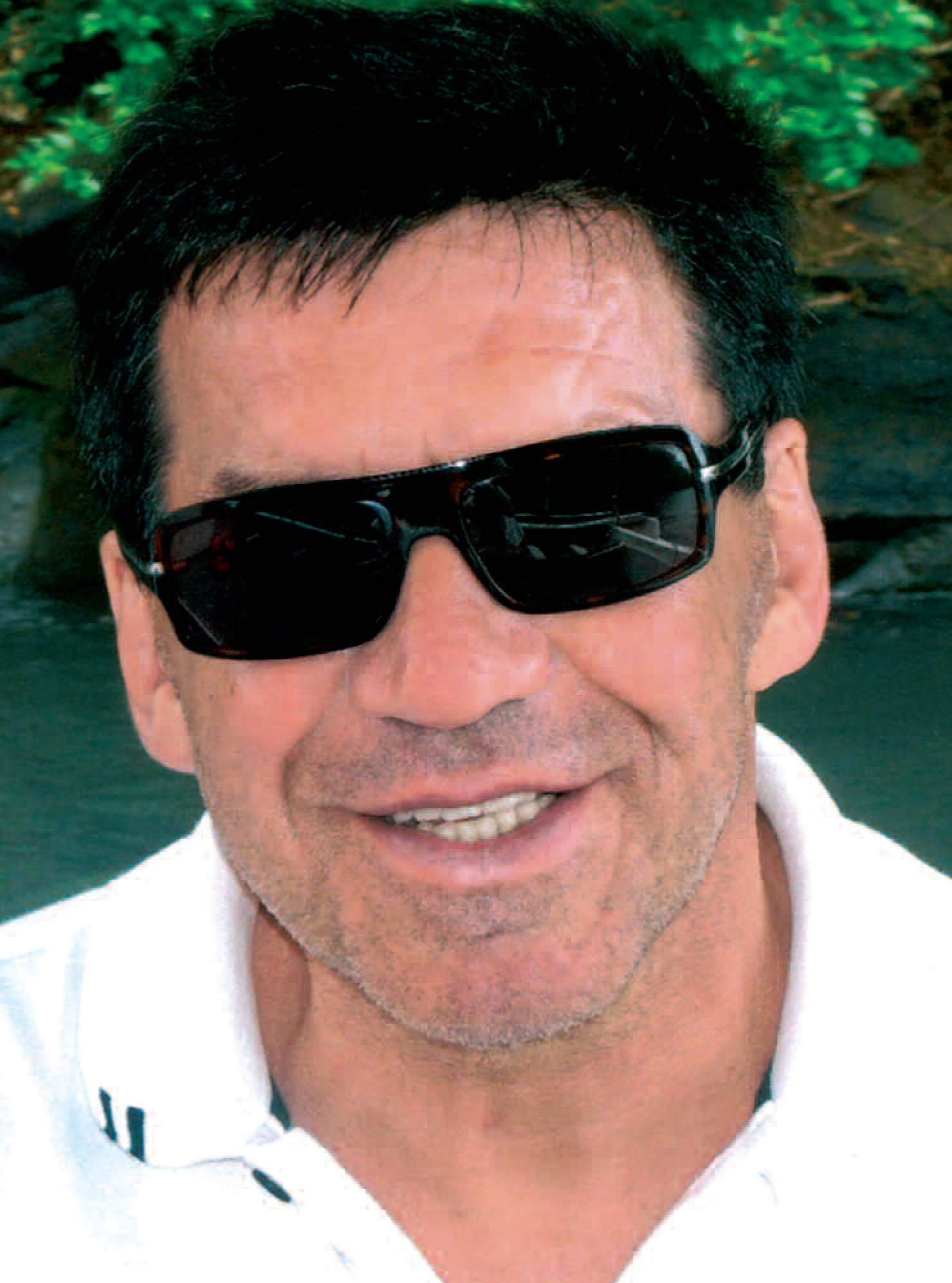
- Davy in 2009
- Born: 3 May 1945; Paris, France
- Died: 2 May 2025 (aged 79)
- Occupations: Film producer, film director, screenwriter, actor
- Years active: 1966–2025

Jean-François Davy (French: [ʒɑ̃fʁɑ̃swa davi]; 3 May 1945 – 2 May 2025) was a French film producer, director, screenwriter, and actor. He directed the 1978 film Surprise Sock, which starred Anna Karina. Davy died on 2 May 2025, one day before his 80th birthday.

== Selected filmography ==
- Bananes mécaniques (1973)
- Surprise Sock (1978)
