= Mad Foxes =

1981 film by Paul Grau

- Original German-language poster
- Directed by: Paul Grau
- Written by: Hans R. Walthard; Paul Grau; Melvin Quiñones; Jaime Jesús Balcázar
- Produced by: Erwin C. Dietrich (uncredited)
- Starring: José Gras; Laura Premica; Laly Espinet; Peter John Saunders; Brian Billings; Eric Falk
- Cinematography: Kurt Aeschbacher; Hans-Toni Aschwanden
- Edited by: Peter Baumgartner
- Music by: Walter Baumgartner
- Production companies: Reflection Film; Balcázar Producciones Cinematográficas
- Release dates: 16 September 1981 (Spain); 1 January 1982 (Switzerland)
- Running time: 80 minutes
- Countries: Switzerland; Spain
- Languages: English; Spanish; German

Mad Foxes, known in Switzerland as The Mad Foxes – Feuer auf Räder (lit. 'The Mad Foxes – Wheels on Fire'), and in Spain as Los Violadores (lit. 'The Rapists'), is a 1981 Swiss-Spanish vigilante action film directed and co-written by Paul Grau, starring José Gras, Laura Premica and Eulalia "Laly" Espinet. It chronicles the rivalry between a Corvette-driving playboy and a neo-Nazi biker gang, which escalates from a futile traffic altercation to an all-out vendetta.

Mad Foxes is regarded as a quintessential example of European exploitation cinema, and has been noted for its lurid violence and disjointed plot, which initially caused producer Erwin C. Dietrich to disown it. In some countries including Switzerland and Germany, it was marketed with the subtitle Stingray 2, to tie it to the 1978 American film Stingray, which had been distributed in the region by Dietrich but is otherwise unrelated.

== Plot ==
On his way to a club, Corvette-driving playboy Hal Martin has an altercation with the Rockers, a gang of dirt bike-riding neo-Nazis, which leads to Hal using his car to force one of the bikers into a fatal crash. Afterwards, the gang finds Hal and beats him up and rapes his virginal date.

Hal enlists his karate instructor friend to help him take revenge on the Rockers. Hal, his friend and the students of his dojo attack the gang as they hold a funeral for their fallen comrade, and Hal's friend castrates their leader at Hal's behest. However the next day the gang retaliates and shoots up the dojo, killing Hal's friend and his students. The gang finds out where Hal lives, but Hal manages to escape in his Corvette.

Hal retreats to his elderly parents' home in the country, but the Rockers track him there and kill his parents and their servants while he is out. Hal decides to hunt down the Rockers one by one, killing them in various ways. He returns to his apartment to find his new lover threatened by the Rockers' leader with a pistol and a remote controlled bomb; although Hal tries to talk him out of it, the leader sets off the bomb, killing all three off screen.

== Cast ==
- José Gras as Hal (credited as Robert O'Neal)
- Laura Premica as Silvia Godo
- Eulalia "Laly" Espinet as Babsy (credited as Sally Sullivan)
- Peter John Saunders as Rocker Leader
- Brian Billings as Rocker Hardy
- Eric Falk as Stiletto
- Helmi Sigg as Ronnie (credited as Siggy Helm)
- Guillermo Balcázar as El Nino
- Paul Grau as Karate Instructor
- Antonio Molino Rojo as Parking Manager

== Production ==
=== Development ===
Paul Grau was an established music video director in both Spain and Germanic Europe. In addition, he worked as a production manager for Swiss exploitation film mogul Erwin C. Dietrich. In 1980, Grau founded his own company Reflection Film, and approached Dietrich about helping him put together his feature debut. Through his distribution outfit Ascot, Dietrich had released the German-language version of the 1978 American film Stingray, to some success. Unimpressed by Grau's original ideas, he instructed him to make a derivative of that movie, again showcasing the eponymous sports car.

The director convened with a friend who worked for Swiss tabloid Blick, and they hastily cobbled together eight pages worth of sensational crimes that would form the synopsis of the new project. Some of the men hired to play the bikers were actual Hells Angels, with whom actor Eric Falk had had a heated encounter during his day job as a bodyguard. He was able to defuse the situation by inviting them to participate.

=== Filming ===
Photography spanned two weeks in December 1980. The filming title Stingray II remains visible in the background of one scene. Zurich, Switzerland, hosted interior scenes while the rest of filming took place in Barcelona, Spain, in partnership with local company Balcázar Producciones. The Nazi ceremony was shot at the Teatre Grec in Montjuïc. In this scene as in most outdoor bits, the swastikas are absent from the bikers' flag and armbands due to laws proscribing the public display of such symbols. The stunt coordinator behind the anglicized stage name Ronnie Lee was a Swiss named Roland Kathriner. The hero's vehicle was a customized Corvette C3 from Neufeld's Special Cars, a Zurich exotic dealership, which was brought to Barcelona. However, the production had to make do with light bikes such as Spanish Montesas, rather than the choppers expected from a biker gang, which threw off the riders.

As the project had been brought to him by Grau, Dietrich did not closely oversee the making of it. Actor Helmi Sigg noted Grau's disorganization compared to Dietrich's regular productions, while Grau himself conceded that his directorial effort had "failed terrifically". When he discovered the finished product, Dietrich was so appalled that he could not watch it to its conclusion, and opted to pass on his producer credit. He later claimed that this was the only time in his entire career that he ever tried to obfuscate his involvement with a film.

== Release ==
=== Theatrical ===
Mad Foxes opened in Germany on 14 August 1981 through Dietrich's company Ascot Film, drawing an estimated 225,000 admissions over its national run. The German poster added the subtitle Stingray 2, after the picture it was designed to cash in on. The film debuted in Spain on 16 September 1981 through distributor Regia Films Arturo Gonzales, drawing a total of 147,830 patrons in the country. In Switzerland, the earliest screening on record came in Lucerne on 21 October 1981, before it traveled to other cities. Some promotional materials inverted the film's German subtitle, which read The Mad Foxes – Räder auf Feuer.

There is no trace of a U.S. release, however the film received a run at a Cinépix-affiliated Toronto theater in the week of 19 January 1987, which coincided with a home video release by the same company. This was billed as Mad Foxes' Toronto premiere, although it had been certified in Quebec on 21 May 1982. In the United Kingdom, it was submitted to the BBFC for cinemas by Miracle Films, and cut by some five minutes. However, there is no trace of an actual theatrical release.

=== Home media ===
Mad Foxes was released on German-language videotape in 1982 by Movie-Video Verkaufs, which carried many Dietrich productions. In Spain, a video certificate was issued for the film in 1984, but one source claims that it already appeared in distributor Vidis Asociados' 1982 catalogue, as just Stingray 2. In the U.K., it was one the first two titles—alongside Blackout—from Merlin Video, a joint venture between Miracle Films and Cantley Film Service. It was issued in 1982 through distributor VCL. Although falling in the pre-cert era, that release was similar in length to the censored cut approved for theaters by the BBFC. There is no indication that Mad Foxes was issued on U.S. videotape. However, it did receive an English-language cassette from Cinépix subsidiary Cinema International Canada (CIC) in 1987, which coincided with a brief Toronto theatrical run from the same company. The Stingray 2 subtitle was retained for that edition.

Dietrich brought the film to DVD on his own ABCDVD imprint in 2003, which featured an English track. In 2018, the film was brought to U.S. DVD by Full Moon Features. The film was re-issued on Blu-ray by Austrian outfit Illusions Unlimited in 2013, also with an English track. In 2025, U.S. label Cauldron Films re-issued the film on Blu-ray and 4K Blu-ray, its world premiere on the latter medium.

=== Bans ===
Mad Foxes was indexed in Germany in 1982 by the Federal Review Board for Media Harmful to Minors. It was pulled from the index in 2017. The film was also named to Section 3 of the so-called "Video Nasties" list during the infamous British moral panic of the same name, which meant that people found in possession of the title would not be prosecuted for obscenity, but were still subject to seizure and destruction of their copy.

== Reception ==
Mad Foxes has been universally panned by reviewers. British compendium DVD Delirium declared: "Bullet-paced and completely indefensible, Mad Foxes is one of the most absurd trash-epics ever made. Every single element screams outrageousness — from its tasteless acts of violence and gore to its non-stop slate of sexual shenanigans and nudity (including some startlingly casual male full-frontal shots)." In his opus about 1980s low-budget films, author Daniel Budnik called it "one of the nuttiest films ever" which "there is no proper way to critique". In her 2011 book Rape-Revenge Films: A Critical Study, Alexandra Heller-Nicholas called the film a "brazenly incoherent mélange of kung fu, softcore porn, Nazi fetishism and bike film pegged loosely to a rape-revenge structure, albeit one caught in a garbled narrative loop". American publication Shock Cinema deemed that Mad Foxes "takes you on a truly rancid joyride" which "flows along with its own unfathomable logic" and "combines the brutality of Last House on the Left with the rampant stupidity of Eric Von Zipper."

Grau later became a high-ranking television executive in Switzerland, and has faced occasional scrutiny over the film's controversial content. Towards the end of his life, Dietrich had come to grips with the film's dubious legacy and looked at it more amusingly, even though its censorship issues prevented him from recouping all of his investment.

=== Accolades ===
In a 2011 article, American magazine HorrorHound included Mad Foxes on their list of the most notable revenge films of the 1960–2010 era.

== Soundtrack ==
Director Grau had a working relationship with Swiss hard rockers Krokus, for whom he filmed promos and designed the cover of the 1980 album Metal Rendez-vous. Two songs from their latest record Hardware were featured in Mad Foxes. The band's logo was also displayed on the movie's German-language poster. More incongruously, the club scene includes a group choreography set to a track by boogie-woogie act The Jackys. The song and accompanying footage, which was taken from a TV spot made by Grau for the band's 20 Rock'n'Roll and Boogie-Hits album, were spliced in to pad out the running time after it came up short.
