= Peter Baumgartner (cinematographer) =

Swiss cinematographer (1939–2021)

- Born: 14 February 1939; Zürich, Switzerland]
- Died: 23 August 2021 (aged 82); Zürich, Switzerland
- Occupation: Cinematographer
- Years active: 1962–1990 (film)

Peter Baumgartner (14 February 1939 – 23 August 2021) was a Swiss cinematographer. He worked frequently with the producer-director Erwin C. Dietrich during his career. He was the nephew of the composer Walter Baumgartner.

== Selected filmography ==
- Two Bavarians in Bonn (1962)
- St. Pauli Between Night and Morning (1967)
- The Colonel's Nieces (1968)
- Bed Hostesses (1973)
- Jack the Ripper (1976)
- Love Letters of a Portuguese Nun (1977)
- High Test Girls (1980)
- Code Name: Wild Geese (1984)
- Commando Leopard (1985)

== Bibliography ==
- Peter Cowie & Derek Elley. World Filmography: 1967. Fairleigh Dickinson University Press, 1977.
