= Franca Maï =

French actress and novelist

- Born: Françoise Baud; 26 July 1959; Paris, France
- Died: 8 February 2012 (aged 52); Villejuif, Val-de-Marne, France
- Occupations: Actress, novelist
- Years active: 1978–1988 (actress)
- Spouse: Georgie Fromentin (m.?–?)
- Website: francamai.net

Franca Maï (born Françoise Baud; 26 July 1959 – 8 February 2012) was a French actress and novelist. She is perhaps best known for her role in the Jean Rollin vampire classic Fascination.

== Early life ==
Franca Maï was born Françoise Baud in 1959 in Paris, France and was the eldest of four children, having two younger sisters and a brother. She spent most of her childhood growing up between Paris and Eure-et-Loir.

== Career ==
In 1979, Maï made her film debut when she received the leading role in Jean Rollin's classic vampire tale Fascination, which is considered to be one of the best films in all of Rollin's canon. In Fascination, Maï portrayed the role of 'Elisabeth', a mysterious chambermaid who resides in a deserted château with her lesbian lover (Brigitte Lahaie), when they are encountered by a charming jewel thief (Jean-Marie Lemaire) who takes refuge in the château. What followed was three further feature films, in which she received minor roles; Zig Zag Story, a 1983 comedy written and directed by Patrick Schulmann, Ody Roos' Point mort and finally in 1987, Le moustachu, which was written and directed by Dominique Chaussois. Maï appeared in two television films; Quatre femmes, quatre vies: Des chandails pour l'hiver in 1981 and Les idiots in 1987. She had a guest role in the ORTF and Antenne 2 crime drama series Les enquêtes du commissaire Maigret. In 1988, her final appearance as an actress came when she was cast in the short film Berceaumniaque, which was written and directed by Maï's then life companion Yoram Mevorach Oyoram.

In 1993, she directed, wrote, produced and edited the short film L'an de mes II. Yoram Mevorach Oyoram served as cinematographer and co-editor on the film. In her second short, in 2003, Maï not only directed, wrote, edited the film, she tried her hand at cinematography and performed the song "La chanson du garde-barrière".

In her later life, Maï became a successful novelist. Eight novels were published between 2002 and 2009; Momo qui kills, Jean-Pôl & la môme caoutchouc, Speedy Mata, L’ultime Tabou, Pedro, L’Amour Carnassier, Crescendo and Divino Sacrum: Carnet de bord d’une vieille cancéreuse fripée, respectively. Her final book, Divino Sacrum, which was written during her long battle with cancer, was published and released posthumously.

Maï was also a successful singer, photographer, poet and the co-creator of a website.

== Death ==
Maï was diagnosed with cancer in 2008. Having gone through long-term chemotherapy and radiation therapy she relapsed. She died on 8 February 2012 at 52 in Villejuif, Val-de-Marne, France.

== Filmography ==
Film & television
Year	Title	Role	Notes
1978	En l'autre bord	(unknown role)	Feature film
1979	Fascination	Elisabeth	Feature film
1981	Quatre femmes, quatre vies: Des chandails pour l'hiver	Une Journaliste	Television film
1983	Les enquêtes du commissaire Maigret	La Serveuse	Television series; Episode — "La colère de Maigret'
1983	Zig Zag Story	Béatrice	Feature film
1984	Point mort	Lena	Feature film
1987	Le moustachu	Catherine Fruck	Feature film
1987	Les idiots	La prostituée	Television film
1988	Berceaumniaque	La Pythie	Video short

Short films
Year	Title	Credited work					
Year	Title	Director	Producer	Writer	Editor	Cinematographer	Soundtrack
1993	L'an de mes II					—N/a	—N/a
2003	FuckAnge		—N/a	(Note: Story: "Le clochard ricanant")			(Note: Performer: "La chanson du garde-barrière")
2011	Soins palliatifs à domicile		—N/a		—N/a	—N/a	—N/a
