= Jack the Ripper (1976 film) =

1976 film by Jesús Franco

- West German film poster
- German: Jack the Ripper - Der Dirnenmörder von London
- Directed by: Jesús Franco
- Written by: Jesús Franco
- Produced by: Erwin C. Dietrich
- Starring: Klaus Kinski; Josephine Chaplin; Andreas Mannkopff; Herbert Fux; Lina Romay
- Cinematography: Peter Baumgartner
- Edited by: Marie-Louise Buschke
- Music by: Walter Baumgartner
- Production company: Cinemec-Film
- Distributed by: Avis Filmverleih
- Release date: September 23, 1976 (West Germany)
- Running time: 91 minutes
- Country: West Germany
- Language: German

Jack the Ripper (German: Jack the Ripper - Der Dirnenmörder von London, lit. 'Jack the Ripper - The London Prostitute Murderer') is a 1976 West German horror film directed by Jesús Franco, and starring Klaus Kinski, Josephine Chaplin, Andreas Mannkopff, Herbert Fux and Lina Romay.

Despite its title, the film is largely re-staged version of Franco's earlier film The Awful Dr. Orloff (1962), with Franco's signature 'Orloff' character filling the historical Jack the Ripper role. This was one of several films Franco made for producer Erwin C. Dietrich during the 1970s. The West German and Swiss co-production was filmed largely in Zurich, and was released on September 23, 1976.

== Plot ==
Dr. Dennis Orloff leads a secret double life. By day, he selflessly cares for his needy patients in his practice, while by night he prowls the streets of London as a serial killer of prostitutes, dubbed "Jack the Ripper" by the press. He's haunted by memories of his abusive prostitute mother, which instilled in him a hatred of women and of sex workers in particular.

After the remains of his latest victim are found in the Thames, a witness to one of Orloff's killings comes forward – an elderly blind man. Based on the testimony, Scotland Yard Inspector Anthony Selby is able to determine that is a person of high social standing, well-dressed, and likely a doctor. Meanwhile, Selby's fiancée Cynthia, has her own plan to catch the killer, disguising herself as a prostitute and roaming the streets to attract the Ripper's attention.

Charlie, a day laborer and one of Orloff's patients, recognizes the doctor from the blind man's description and tries to blackmail him. However his plan fails, Orloff kills him and hides the body in his attic, where its later discovered by his landlady, who informs the police

Orloff kidnaps Cynthia. Before he can kill her, the police led by Selby stop him, and take him into custody.

== Cast ==
- Klaus Kinski as Dr. Dennis Orloff
- Josephine Chaplin as Cynthia
- Andreas Mannkopff as Inspector Anthony Selby
- Herbert Fux as Charlie
- Lina Romay as Marika Stevenson
- Nikola Weisse as Frieda ("Flora" in the English dub)
- Ursula von Wiese as Ms. Higgins
- Hans Gaugler as John Bridger
- Francine Custer as Sally Brown
- Olga Gebhard as Mrs. Baxter
- Angelika Arndts as Mrs. Stevenson
- Peter Nüsch as Sgt. Rupert
- Esther Studer as Jeannie

Cast adapted from Flowers of Perversion: The Delirious Cinema of Jesús Franco: Volume Two (2018).

== Production ==
In April 1976, director Jesús Franco suggested to producer Erwin C. Dietrich to make a horror film based on the case of Jack the Ripper. Franco biographer Stephen Thrower said that despite the title, the film predominantly a re-staged version of his film The Awful Dr. Orloff (1962). In an interview with Swiss journalist Hans D. Furrer, Franco said that he needed his version of Jack the Ripper to have a name, leading him to say "So why not Orloff? He is my favorite such figure and I had the opportunity, this time, to shoot a larger Orloff film. One thing that's very important to me in this film its that I was lucky enough to get the actor Klaus Kinski. I have already made several films with him. He is an actor I admire, and my Orloff is an ideal role for Kinski."

The project was designed from the beginning to have Klaus Kinski as the lead actor. When working on the film Marquis de Sade: Justine (1969), director Jesús Franco would first work actor Klaus Kinski. Franco would work with Kinski on three more films together with Jack the Ripper being the last of their collaborations. In 1977, Kinski spoke about his work with Franco, stating that the director was "the exact opposite of so many others. In a way, I'll always stick up for him. He shoots in his own style, very fast, very swift, he doesn't dwell on things. He makes films with whatever he has to hand, and that's where his talent lies; he can make you weep by his ability to bring out what's inside people."

Franco had initially wanted Edmund Purdom for the role of the inspector, but the role eventually went to Andreas Mannkopff. Franco initially wanted to shoot in London and southern France, with Dietrich and Franco eventually settling to shoot in Zurich. This included location shooting along the Schanzengraben canal which was to represent the River Thames.

According to cinematographer Peter Baumgartner, Franco began on pre-production for Jack the Ripper in May 1976 after returning from Paris. It was shot between June 1 and the 25th. Jack the Ripper was a West German film production from the Berlin-based Cinemec-Film. The film was shot without any sound recorded. All dialogue on location was spoken in whatever language the actors preferred to talk in.

During editing, Jack the Ripper was made to match the script and written in German, which Dietrich considers to be the "original version of the film."

== Release ==
Jack the Ripper was released in Germany under the title Jack the Ripper - Der Dirnenmérder Von London where it was distributed by Avis Filmverleih. The film was only one of the few productions by Dietrich to release in France, where it was released as Jack l'eventreur. It has been released by United Kingdom and American-based DVD distributors as Jack the Ripper.

Jack the Ripper on Blu-ray by Ascot Elite Home Entertainment on September 24, 2013.

== Reception ==
Robert Firsching of AllMovie described it as "one of the better efforts" from Franco, specifically noting the performances from Kinski and Lina Romay.

== See also ==
- Klaus Kinski filmography
- Horror films of Europe
