= Eva Christian =

German actress (born 1937)

- Born: Evelyne Gutmann; 27 May 1937 (age 88); Berlin, Germany
- Occupation: Actress
- Years active: 1958–present

Eva Christian (née Evelyne Gutmann, born 27 May 1937) is a German actress who has appeared in numerous films since her 1958 film debut. Born in Berlin, she grew up in Romania, and made her stage debut at the Bucharest Comedy Theater. In 1962, she went to Germany, where she appeared at the Freie Volksbühne Berlin, under Erwin Piscator.

== Selected filmography ==
Film
Year	Title	Role	Notes
1957	Erupția	Anca	
1967	St. Pauli Between Night and Morning	Arlette	
1970	Anjos e Demônios	Virgínia	
1971	The Woman in White	Marian Halcombe	TV miniseries
1972	Ohne Nachsicht	Luise	
1972	Tears of Blood	Karin	
1974	Aux frontières du possible	Christa Neumann	TV series, 3 episodes
1982	The Life of Verdi	Teresa Stolz	TV miniseries
2001	Resurrection	Agrafena	
2005	The Fisherman and His Wife	Alina	
