= Bed Hostesses =

- Swiss DVD cover
- German: Die Bett-Hostessen
- Directed by: Erwin C. Dietrich
- Written by: Erwin C. Dietrich
- Produced by: Erwin C. Dietrich
- Starring: Ingrid Steeger; Karin Hofmann; Christa Free
- Cinematography: Peter Baumgartner
- Edited by: Marie-Luise Buschke
- Music by: Walter Baumgartner
- Production company: Ascot Film
- Distributed by: Avis Film
- Release date: 6 April 1973
- Running time: 79 minutes
- Countries: Switzerland; West Germany
- Language: German

Bed Hostesses (German: Die Bett-Hostessen) is a 1973 West German-Swiss sex comedy film directed by Erwin C. Dietrich and starring Ingrid Steeger, Karin Hofmann and Christa Free.

== Cast ==
- Ingrid Steeger as Hostess at Cyclist Carlo
- Karin Hofmann as Ev'chen - the forest fairy
- Christa Free as Ilona
- Monica Marc as Nurse Angelika
- Kurt Meinicke as Ilona's lover and 'Bunny'
- Kenita Flynn
- Carlo Monti as Carlo Salvatore - the cyclist
- Christian van Bergen as one of the rangers
- Max Crottet
- Rolf Häubi as Ernesto
- Roman Huber
- Jürg Coray as County Court bailiff
- Fritz Steinmann
- Yuma Streiff
- Raphael Britten as Oberarzt Adolar
- Britt Corvin as Maxi
