= The Woman in White (1971 TV series) =

West German television series

- DVD cover
- Genre: Historical mystery
- Based on: The Woman in White by Wilkie Collins
- Written by: Herbert Asmodi
- Directed by: Wilhelm Semmelroth
- Starring: Heidelinde Weis; Eva Christian; Eric Pohlmann
- Composer: Hans Jönsson
- Country of origin: West Germany
- Original language: German
- No. of series: 1
- No. of episodes: 3

Production
- Cinematography: Dieter Naujeck
- Running time: 260 minutes
- Production company: Westdeutscher Rundfunk

Original release
- Network: ARD
- Release: 16 May – 30 May 1971

The Woman in White (German: Die Frau in Weiß) is a West German historical mystery television series which originally aired on ARD between 16 May and 30 May 1971. It is an adaptation of the 1860 novel The Woman in White by the British writer Wilkie Collins.

== Cast ==
- Heidelinde Weis as Die Frau in Weiß/Laura
- Eva Christian as Marian Halcombe
- Christoph Bantzer as Walter Hartright
- Pinkas Braun as Sir Percival Glyde
- Helmut Käutner as Sir Frederic Fairlie
- Eric Pohlmann as Conte Fosco
- Edith Lechtape as Contessa Fosco
- Hans Hinrich as Rechtsanwalt Gilmore
- Alf Marholm as Rechtsanwalt Merriman
- Wolfgang Unterzaucher as Pesca
- Tana Schanzara as Frau Clements
- Jenny Thelen as Frau Catherick
- Erwin Scherschel as Lehrer Dempster
- Theo Heinemann as Sergeant Blain
- Arthur Jaschke as Doktor Dawson
- Willy Lindberg as Doktor Goodrick
- Jaromír Borek as Rechtsanwalt Wansborough
- Jürgen Schneider as Schüler Tommy
- Victor Beaumont as Mann in Schwarz
- Frank Barufski as Küster

== Bibliography ==
- Musial, Torsten & Wiebel, Martin. Die Fernsehspielredaktion des WDR 1965 - 1979: Einsichten in die Wirklichkeit. 2004.
