= Erwin C. Dietrich =

Swiss film director

- Born: 4 October 1930; Glarus, Switzerland
- Died: 15 March 2018 (aged 87); Zürich, Switzerland
- Occupations: Film director, film producer, actor, cinematographer

Erwin C. Dietrich (4 October 1930 – 15 March 2018) was a Swiss film director, producer and actor, often regarded as one of the most influential cinematographers in Switzerland.

== Biography ==
Dietrich was born on 4 October 1930 in Glarus. He died on 15 March 2018 in Zürich.

== Career ==
He quit his dream of becoming an actor rather early on and instead started focusing on his sense for artistic trends appealing to audiences. Starting in 1955 he began producing movies, first with his company "Urania": The films The Man in the Black Derby and The Model Husband starring Swiss comedian Walter Roderer turned into big successes. At around the time where the "Edgar Wallace" thrillers became popular in Germany, Erwin brought Nylon Noose and The Strangler of the Tower starring German movie stars, such as Dietmar Schönherr, to the cinemas.

He achieved commercial success with his directorial debut in 1968, the film adaptation of Guy de Maupassant's novel The Colonel's Nieces. Over 45 more films followed until 1980. Movies that he either directed or produced, often using pseudonyms such "Michael Thomas" or "Manfred Gregor" under the umbrella of newly "Elite-Film" (later: "Ascot Film GmbH"). Most of these movies came to life in a very informal environment, with a small crew in his studios in Rümlang, where the set pieces were rearranged on the fly. Some highlights can be found, in particular those starring Ingrid Steeger or French erotic star number one, Brigitte Lahaie. These movies have meanwhile advanced to cult status and are long running favorites at movie festivals and in home cinemas worldwide. Erwin often mentioned his favorite movie to be his remake of The Colonel's Nieces, starring Brigitte Lahaie.

Jess Franco, who for years has been ridiculed as a cheap grunge director and yet in the end received the "Goya" award, the Spanish Oscar, made 17 films in this work period with Erwin C. Dietrich and called it the most productive and pleasant period of his career. Film such as Love Letters of a Portuguese Nun or Jack the Ripper with performances by Klaus Kinski were praised by industry friends and fans such as Joe Dante and Quentin Tarantino who once called Erwin the "Swiss Roger Corman".

The Story of Piera produced by him and directed by Marco Ferreri, starring Isabelle Huppert and Marcello Mastroianni, may not have been a commercially comparable success to Erwin's other productions but it turned into a huge hit at the festivals, and Hanna Schygulla received the "Golden Palm" in Cannes for her performance.

The action film The Wild Geese, which he distributed, garnered him international recognition. The cast included Richard Harris, Roger Moore, Richard Burton, and Hardy Krüger did its share; the movie was seen by 4 million movie-goers in Germany alone and advanced to become a huge blockbuster in 1978, ultimately winning the "Goldene Leinwand" award. Following this success Erwin acquired distribution rights to additional big productions on the big screen, including Escape to Athena and The Sea Wolves. Convinced by their success Erwin began production along with business partner Peter Baumgartner (and Peter's dubbing studios in Berlin, "Cinephon") three action spectacles to be shot in the Philippines. Emphasized by a gigantic marketing campaign (including an ecstatic Klaus Kinski dominating the promo tour) he released in the mid-80s the "mercenary trilogy" consisting of Code Name: Wild Geese, Commando Leopard and The Commander on the big screen, the cast included Klaus Kinski, Ernest Borgnine, and Lee Van Cleef.

During that time he also opened up the first cinema-multiplex in Switzerland called "Capitol". Later he expanded it with the "Cinemax". In the beginning of the 1990s, after the dance film Dance Academy 2: Dance to Win, the two Swiss comedies Ein Schweizer namens Nötzli and Der doppelte Nötzli, Deitrich retired from the active movie production business and committed himself to his movie distribution company "Ascot-Elite" which was taken over by his children.

== Selected filmography ==
- 1955: Das Mädchen vom Pfarrhof
- 1957: The King of Bernina
- 1959: The Model Husband
- 1960: The Man in the Black Derby
- 1961: Die Gejagten
- 1961: Die Hazy Osterwald Story
- 1962: Two Bavarians in Bonn
- 1963: The Nylon Noose
- 1964: Coffin from Hong Kong
- 1966: The Strangler of the Tower
- 1966: Black Market of Love
- 1967: St. Pauli Between Night and Morning
- 1967: Seitenstraße der Prostitution
- 1968: …und noch nicht sechzehn
- 1968: Unruhige Töchter
- 1968: Hinterhöfe der Liebe
- 1968: The Colonel's Nieces
- 1969: Weisse Haut auf schwarzem Markt
- 1969: Die Mühle der Jungfrauen
- 1969: Die Nichten der Frau Oberst, 2. Teil – Mein Bett ist meine Burg
- 1969: Nackter Norden
- 1969: Die Neffen des Herrn General
- 1969: Champagner für Zimmer 17
- 1969: The Ribald Tales of Robin Hood (a.k.a. Robin Hood und seine lüsternen Mädchen)
- 1970: Schwarzer Nerz auf zarter Haut
- 1970: Porno Baby
- 1970: Intimità proibite di una giovane sposa
- 1970: La salamandra del deserto (a.k.a. Tamar Wife of Er)
- 1970: Ich – ein Groupie
- 1970: Django Nudo und die lüsternen Mädchen von Porno Hill (a.k.a. Brand of Shame)
- 1971: Die Sexabenteuer der drei Musketiere
- 1971: The Lustful Turk
- 1971: The Young Seducers
- 1971: The Swingin' Stewardesses
- 1972: The Young Seducers 2
- 1972: Mädchen mit offenen Lippen
- 1972: Die Mädchenhändler
- 1972: Blutjunge Masseusen
- 1972: The Calendar Girls
- 1973: Bed Hostesses
- 1973: Mädchen, die nach Liebe schreien
- 1973: Eine Armee Gretchen
- 1974: Der Teufel in Miss Jonas
- 1974: Mädchen, die sich hocharbeiten
- 1974: Frauen, die für Sex bezahlen
- 1974: Heisser Sex in Bangkok
- 1974: Die bumsfidelen Mädchen vom Birkenhof
- 1975: Heisser Mund auf feuchten Lippen
- 1975: Mädchen ohne Männer
- 1975: Mädchen, die sich selbst bedienen
- 1975: Rolls-Royce Baby
- 1975: Was geschah wirklich mit Miss Jonas
- 1976: Heisse Berührungen (a.k.a. Midnight Party)
- 1976: Mädchen, die am Wege liegen
- 1976: Frauengefängnis (a.k.a. Barbed Wire Dolls)
- 1976: Downtown – Die nackten Puppen der Unterwelt
- 1976: Mädchen im Nachtverkehr (Girls of the Night Shift)
- 1976: Jack the Ripper
- 1976: Die Marquise de Sade (a.k.a. The Portrait of Doriana Gray)
- 1977: Ilsa, the Wicked Warden (a.k.a. Greta, the Mad Butcher)
- 1977: Love Letters of a Portuguese Nun
- 1977: Die Sklavinnen (The Slaves)
- 1977: Nach Bangkok… der Liebe wegen
- 1977: Tänzerinnen für Tanger
- 1977: In 80 Betten um die Welt (Around the World in 80 Beds)
- 1977: Weisse Haut auf schwarzen Schenkeln (White Skin, Black Thigh)
- 1977: Das Frauenhaus (a.k.a. Le Cabaret des filles perverses)
- 1977: Die teuflischen Schwestern (a.k.a. Deux sœurs vicieuses)
- 1977: Frauen im Liebeslager (Love Camp)
- 1977: Ruf der blonden Göttin (The Call of the Blonde Goddess)
- 1978: Frauen ohne Unschuld (Women Without Innocence)
- 1978: Women in Cellblock 9
- 1978: Mädchen nach Mitternacht
- 1978: The Wild Geese
- 1979: Sechs Schwedinnen im Pensionat
- 1980: The Colonel's Nieces
- 1980: Gefangene Frauen
- 1980: High Test Girls (a.k.a. Sechs Schwedinnen von der Tankstelle)
- 1980: Julchen und Jettchen
- 1981: Mad Foxes
- 1981: Sechs Schwedinnen auf Ibiza
- 1982: Ein lasterhafter Sommer
- 1982: Heisser Sex auf Ibiza
- 1982: Sechs Schwedinnen hinter Gittern (Ball Game)
- 1983: The Story of Piera
- 1983: Sechs Schwedinnen auf der Alm
- 1984: The Future Is Woman
- 1984: Code Name: Wild Geese
- 1985: Commando Leopard
- 1986: Operation Nam
- 1988: The Commander
- 1988: Ein Schweizer namens Nötzli
- 1989: Dance Academy II
- 1990: Der doppelte Nötzli
