= St. Pauli Between Night and Morning =

1967 film

- Directed by: José Bénazéraf
- Written by: Wolfgang Steinhardt
- Produced by: Erwin C. Dietrich; Willy Zeyn
- Starring: Eva Christian; Helmut Förnbacher; Dunja Rajter
- Cinematography: George Balogh; Peter Baumgartner
- Edited by: Eva Zeyn
- Music by: Frank Valdor
- Production company: Urania Film
- Distributed by: Avis Film
- Release date: 13 April 1967
- Running time: 89 minutes
- Country: West Germany
- Language: German

St. Pauli Between Night and Morning (German: St. Pauli zwischen Nacht und Morgen) is a 1967 West German crime film directed by José Bénazéraf and starring Eva Christian, Helmut Förnbacher and Dunja Rajter. Shot and set in the St. Pauli red light district of Hamburg, it was one of a number of crime films produced in the era that used the city as a backdrop.

== Synopsis ==
Helmut Schmidt a Zurich-based Interpol officer is seconded to Hamburg to infiltrate a gang of drug smugglers. Working out that it is based out of a nightclub, he recruits the French dancer Arlette to assist him in working undercover. But the two start a relationship and Schmidt begins to think of double-crossing his own police colleagues and fleeing abroad with Arlette and the cash from a planned robbery.

== Cast ==
- Eva Christian as Tänzerin Arlette
- Helmut Förnbacher as Helmut Schmidt, Leiter der Interpol Zürich
- Dunja Rajter as Stripperin Linda
- Rolf Eden as Nachtclubbesitzer Bernie
- Hans Waldherr as Geldtransporträuber
- Tom Riedel as Playboy Galinski
- Bob Iller as Freund von Bernie
- Jochen Sehrndt as Geldtransporträuber
- Edgar Maschmann as Polizeipräsident

== Bibliography ==
- Eppenberger, Beni & Stapfer, Daniel. Mädchen, Machos und Moneten: die unglaubliche Geschichte des Schweizer Kinounternehmers Erwin C. Dietrich. Verlag Scharfe Stiefel, 2006.
- Naumann, Gerd & Kramp, Joachim. Die Jerry-Cotton-Filme. Ibidem-Verlag, 2011.
