= Teufel im Fleisch =

1964 film

- Directed by: Hermann Wallbrück
- Written by: Hermann Wallbrück
- Produced by: Kurt Palm
- Starring: Aleksandar Gavrić; Ruth Gassmann; Peter Heim; Dunja Rajter; Ingrid Boyer; Maria Rohm
- Cinematography: Stevo Landup
- Edited by: Marlis Detjens
- Music by: Karl Schröder
- Production company: Rewa-Films
- Distributed by: Gloria (West Germany)
- Release date: 7 January 1964 (West Germany)
- Running time: 83 minutes
- Country: West Germany
- Language: German

Teufel im Fleisch ("Devil in the flesh" in German) is a 1964 West German film directed by Hermann Wallbrück.

== Plot ==
As young people dance the twist carefree, a voice-over warns of impending sexually-transmitted diseases. Doctors Alexander, Esters and Jensen leave Trieste by boat for Africa to search for the causes there. In a flashback, we learn that Dr. Alexander and Dr. Esters met through treatment for syphilis. Dr. Alexander and Dr. Jensen, in turn, saved the beautiful Jenny from being attacked by Soviet soldiers at the end of the war. Since then, they have worked together with Jenny as an assistant. When a squad of soldiers storms the clinic, they attack Jenny.

Back in the present, the ship's doctor, Dr. Beuron heads to his apprenticeship in Marseille. There he is beaten by pimps before the police arrest the prostitutes. The next day, a stowaway is discovered. She also tells her story in a flashback. Upon reaching East Africa, the researchers visit a clinic there. A local colleague explains that the white man brought a nasty disease. They see evidence of prostitution everywhere before flying back home. There, Dr. Alexander gives a lecture with photos of syphilis patients. Dr. Esters complements the lecture with her report, visible as a flashback, about a sick person who has gone insane. Finally, Dr. Jensen provides insight into the moral decay in today's youth.

== Cast ==
- Aleksandar Gavrić as Dr. Alexander
- Ruth Gassmann as Dr. Esters
- Peter Heim as Dr. Jensen
- Dunja Rajter as Jenny
- Ingrid Boyer as Stowaway
- Maria Rohm as Prostitute
- Manrik Schumacher as Dr. Beuron

== Production ==
Location shooting took place in Addis Ababa, Massawa, Asmara, Venice, Geneva, Munich, Vienna, and Hamburg. The film, which was shot in 1963, had its world premiere on January 7, 1964, at the Royal Cinema in Munich.

== Reception ==
Author Rolf Thissen regarded Teufel im Fleisch as a traditional "old" sex education film, which "on the one hand speculates on the viewer's fear of the undesirable consequences of lust and on the other hand encourages them by showing something that otherwise would not have been tolerated in the cinema" in contrast to the "new" educational films that appeared a few years later.

Criticism of the film mainly focused on how the film's synopsis mostly consists of flashbacks. Süddeutsche Zeitung of January 10, 1964 wrote: "The film calls itself a 'documentary', but is really just an unusually poorly staged 'illustrated film.'"

The Münchner Merkur of January 9, 1964 summed it up: "But the fact that such a 'devil in the flesh' can be expelled by creating fatigue is probably the only novel aspect of this film".

Filmdienst commented: "A speculative, quickly-shot film with no relevance and no effective educational effect".

== Bibliography ==
- Thissen, Rolf (1995). Sex verklärt. Der deutsche Aufklärungsfilm [Sex transfigured. The German Enlightenment Film] (in German). Munich: Wilhelm Heyne Verlag. ISBN 3-453-09005-5.
