= Aux frontières du possible =

French television show

- Created by: Henri Viard
- Starring: Pierre Vaneck, Elga Andersen
- Countries of origin: France, Germany
- No. of episodes: 13

Production
- Running time: approx. 50 min per episode

Original release
- Network: ORTF
- Release: 4 October 1971 – 6 April 1974

Aux frontières du possible (To the Boundaries of the Possible) is a French television show that was broadcast from 1971 and 1974. The show was created by Henri Viard and Jacques Bergier, based on the latter's book Scientific Espionage. 13 50-minute episodes were made, and the series was shown on channel 2 of the French ORTF network. In Canada, the series was broadcast in 1972 and 1974 on Radio-Canada.

== Synopsis ==
This series depicts two agents from the "International Bureau of scientific prevention" (BIPS, "Bureau international de prévention scientifique") who are responsible for protecting mankind from the criminal use of the latest scientific discoveries.

== Cast ==
- Pierre Vaneck : Yan Thomas
- Elga Andersen : Barbara Andersen

== Episodes ==
=== First series (1971) ===
1. Le Dossier des mutations « V » (The "V" mutations folder)
2. Attention, névroses mentales (Caution, neuroses)
3. Terreur au ralenti (Slow-motion terror)
4. Menaces sur le sixième continent (Menaces on the 6th continent)
5. L'Homme-radar (The Radar Man)
6. Protection spéciale ultra-sons « U » (Special protection of U-ultrasound)

=== Second series (1974) ===
1. Le Dernier Rempart (The Last Bastion)
2. Le Cabinet noir (The Black Cabinet)
3. Les Hommes volants (The Flying Men)
4. Meurtres à distance (Long-distance Murder)
5. Alerte au Minotaure (Minotaur Alert!)
6. Le Créateur de visible (The Creator of Visible)
7. L'Effaceur de mémoire (The Mind-Wiper)

== Production ==
=== Development ===
Before becoming a writer, Jacques Bergier was a chemical engineer. He was also a spy and resistance fighter during the Second World War. Jacques Bergier was deported to the Mauthausen-Gusen concentration camp from November 1943 to May 1945 for creating a scientific espionage network: Marco-Polo. He received many decorations, both for his discoveries in the field of chemistry and for his exploits as a spy. It is from his scientific knowledge and his experience as a spy and resistance fighter that Jacques Bergier writes most of his books, including L'Espionnage scientifique which is at the origin of the series Aux frontières du possible.

In an interview published in Télémagazine on October 9, 1971, Jacques Bergier explains how he came up with the idea for the series : "By filing my papers, a few years ago, I found a certificate that had been sent to me in 1946, signed by Marshal Montgomery. He congratulated me for the espionage work I had done during the war. But this certificate was issued to me not from a particular nation, but from the United Nations. It gave me the idea that there could, perhaps be, a secret service of the United Nations, working only for peace. I expressed this idea quite seriously in my book: Scientific Espionage."

Henri Viard was then seduced by Jacques Bergier's book and wanted to adapt it for television. Together, they wrote the screenplay for the series. The United Nations spy bureau that Jacques Bergier imagines becomes in the series the B.I.P.S. (International Bureau of Scientific Prevention)

=== Concept ===
- The series is at the confluence of two genres: the detective and science fiction or rather "realistic anticipation" according to Henri Viard, co-writer of the series. According to him, the series describes "the life of tomorrow in the time of today". In an interview published in Le Journal d'Elbeuf on Tuesday, September 28, 1971, Henri Viard declared: "The series we have made is not science fiction, but predictive science."
- Episode format: each episode is a whole with an isolated plot around a mysterious phenomenon that the members of the B.I.P.S. will have to solve. The heroes (members of the B.I.P.S.) find themselves from adventure to adventure.

=== Opening and closing credits ===
Each episode opens with a five-second card with the title of the series "Aux frontières du possible" written on an orange background and accompanied by the music of Jacques Arel. Then, a sequence of about three minutes presents the plot of the episode, the mysterious phenomenon that will be the subject of an investigation by the B.I.P.S. and then the credits begin.

The credits start with the mention of the title of the episode. Yan Thomas and Barbara Andersen are seen getting out of a car and entering the offices of the B.I.P.S (the logo is displayed on the sliding doors of the entrance to the building). To the music of Jacques Arel, we see the two protagonists walking the corridors of the agency, passing several security gates in order to reach their unit. Credits mentioning authors, producers and directors accompany the characters in their walk. The credits close with a transition that plunges the viewer into the diegesis of the episode: with the help of a sound fade, we see Yann and Barbara start a conversation while walking in a final corridor. Then they enter the office of Courtenay-Gabor who announces the subject of the investigation treated in the episode in question.

The title of the series is not mentioned in the credits but at the beginning of the episode before the introductory sequence.

=== Filming ===
- During Season 2, Elga Andersen was replaced by Eva Christian, who plays Yan Thomas' new assistant, Christa Neumann. In order to respect the narrative continuity of the series, Barbara Andersen's character is interned in the hospital after being brainwashed.
- Actress Elga Andersen shoots the first ten episodes as Barbara. She then left the series after being hired to star in Lee's film Le Mans. H. Katzin.
- As the series was a Franco-German co-production, it was established from the outset that the heroes would each be of one of the two nationalities.
- The two directors of the series, Victor Vicas and Claude Boissol, alternated to shoot the episodes. When one was shooting, the other was preparing to shoot the next episode, and vice versa. In an interview, Claude Boissol says: "I was very good friends with Victor Vicas and it went very well: while one was shooting, the other was preparing and vice versa. I even replaced Vicas, bedridden by a stroke of renal colic, for a shoot in Montreal."
- Most of the series was shot in the Paris region and at the Radio-Astronomie station in Nançay.
- Some episodes are shot partially abroad in collaboration with local broadcasters:
- Finland - Episode "The Flying Men" in collaboration with M.T.V.
- Canada - Episodes "Les Créateurs de visible" and "L'Effaceur de mémoire" in collaboration with Radio-Canada

=== Scientific foundation ===
Each episode, whose adventures are imaginary, is based on real and scientific facts, existing at the time, at the level of laboratories or pilot plants. This relationship to scientific reality and the possibilities offered by these new scientific discoveries gives the name of the series: "At the frontiers of the possible".

Jacques Bergier and Henri Viard are inspired by the most recent scientific and technological advances or unexplained phenomena to write the scenarios of the episodes. They explore the extrapolations that could be imagined from these discoveries.

Many episodes of the series are directly inspired by scientific discoveries of the time:

The episode "The V Mutation File" is based on the work of Professor Pirie in England, who is seriously studying the possibilities of making diamonds from plants. The episode "The Radar Man": is inspired by the work of Dr. Delgado of the New York Academy of Sciences, who had the idea of attaching implants and transistors to the nervous system of chimpanzees in order to teleguide them

== Reception ==
Upon its release, the series was the subject of several various reviews. On October 12, 1971, Maurice Cruchon wrote in Sud-Ouest, following the second episode, the series is "a good time, if not a highlight".

Nevertheless, when the last episode of the first season is broadcast, Jean-Paul Aymon, still in “France-Soir” but on October 13, 1971, writes of the series that it “reached its cruising speed the same evening where we are presented with the sixth and last episode of the first season of this science fiction series ”. For him, "Elga Andersen and Pierre Vaneck are leaving too soon".

== Note ==
=== Articles ===
- Jacques Benoit, "Dans les coulisses de la télévision avec Henri Viard", Le Journal d'Elbeuf, 28 September 1971
- Alain Diana, "Jacques Bergier est devenu un personnage de Tintin et Milou", TéléMagazine No. 833, p. 64-65, 9 October 1971

=== Bibliography ===
- Baudou, Jacques; Schleret, Jean-Jacques (1995). Merveilleux, fantastique et science-fiction à la télévision française. Bry-sur-Marne / Paris: INA / Huitième art | Les dossiers du 8e art. p. 183. ISBN 2-908905-09-4..
- Baudou, Jacques; Schleret, Jean-Jacques (1990). Meurtres en séries | les séries policières de la télévision française. Paris: Huitième art. p. 289. ISBN 2-7304-0540-2..
