= The Strangler of the Tower =

1966 film

- Directed by: Hans Mehringer
- Written by: Erwin C. Dietrich
- Produced by: Erwin C. Dietrich
- Starring: Charles Regnier; Kai Fischer; Hans Reiser
- Cinematography: Andreas Demmer
- Edited by: Peter Münger
- Music by: Walter Baumgartner; Hans Möckel; Bruno Spoerri
- Production companies: Interopa Film; Urania-Filmproduktion
- Distributed by: Pallas Filmverleih
- Release date: 2 June 1966
- Running time: 83 minutes
- Country: West Germany
- Language: German

The Strangler of the Tower (German: Der Würger vom Tower) is a 1966 West German crime film, directed by Hans Mehringer. It starred Charles Regnier, Kai Fischer and Hans Reiser.

Like the contemporaneous series of Edgar Wallace adaptations by Rialto Film, it has a British setting.

== Synopsis ==
A Scotland Yard detective investigates the theft of a priceless Indian jewel.

== Cast ==
- Charles Regnier as Mr. Cliften
- Kai Fischer as Grace Harrison
- Hans Reiser as Inspektor Harvey
- Ellen Schwiers as Lady Trenton
- Ady Berber as The Strangler
- Christa Linder as Jane Wilkins
- Birgit Bergen as Dodo
- Rainer Bertram as Kiddie
- Inigo Gallo as Pietro Broggini
- Gerhard Geisler as Dr. Livingstone
- Edi Huber as Masters
- Ruth Jecklin as Maisie
- Lis Kertelge as Djaipur
- Walter Kiesler as Sir Burley
- Peter W. Loosli as Travers
- Albert Mol as Larry the Glad
- Alfred Schlageter as Sir Humphry

== Bibliography ==
- Michael R. Pitts. Famous Movie Detectives III. Scarecrow Press, 2004.
