= Ady Berber =

Austrian actor

- Born: 4 February 1913; Vienna, Austria
- Died: 3 January 1966 (aged 52); Vienna, Austria
- Occupation: Actor
- Years active: 1936-1966

Ady Berber (4 February 1913 – 3 January 1966) was an Austrian film actor, professional wrestler and café owner. He appeared in more than 40 films between 1936 and 1966. He was born and died in Vienna, Austria.

== Selected filmography ==
- Court Theatre (1936) - Heurigensänger
- I Am Sebastian Ott (1939) - Meinhardt, Ganove
- Donauschiffer (1940)
- Der Herr Kanzleirat (1948) - Krautstoffel
- Season in Salzburg (1952) - Sepp, Gärtner
- Knall and Fall as Imposters (1952) - Bademeister
- The White Horse Inn (1952) - Luggage porter at 'Weisses Rössl' (uncredited)
- To Be Without Worries (1953) - Wachmann Nestroy
- Die Nacht ohne Moral (1953)
- Die fünf Karnickel (1953) - Franz
- Carnival Story (1954) - Groppo
- Marianne of My Youth (1955) - Diener
- Lola Montès (1955) - Bulgakov (uncredited)
- And Who Is Kissing Me? (1956) - Boxer
- Almenrausch und Edelweiß (1957) - Masseur (uncredited)
- A Thousand Stars Aglitter (1959) - Marko
- Ben Hur (1959) - Malluch (uncredited)
- Peter Voss, Hero of the Day (1959) - Leslie aus Texas
- Mein Schatz, komm mit ans blaue Meer (1959) - Glatzköpfiger Schläger (uncredited)
- Gauner-Serenade (1960) - Adi
- Das Dorf ohne Moral (1960) - 'Tiger-Hai', Chef des "Tabarin"
- The Dead Eyes of London (1961) - Jacob "Der blinde Jack" Farrell
- The Secret Ways (1961) - Sandor
- The Return of Doctor Mabuse (1961) - Alberto Sandro
- Schlagerrevue 1962 (1961)
- The Door with Seven Locks (1962) - Peter Cawler / Giacco
- The Gypsy Baron (1962) - Ein Schatzgräber
- The Black Cobra (1963) - Punkti
- The Nylon Noose (1963)) - Henry
- The Indian Scarf (1963) - Chiko
- Scotland Yard Hunts Dr. Mabuse (1963) - Hangman
- Im singenden Rößl am Königssee (1963) - Harald
- Our Crazy Aunts in the South Seas (1964) - Medizinmann Wudu-Budu
- Frühstück mit dem Tod (1964) - Ernie, Leibwächter von Adama
- Tim Frazer and the Mysterious Mister X (1964) - Lode Van Dijk
- Hotel of Dead Guests (1965) - Hoteldiener Teddy
- Tausend Takte Übermut (1965) - Hausdiener
- Diamonds Are Brittle (1965) - Max
- The Murderer with the Silk Scarf (1966) - Kriminalinspektor Stenzel
- The Strangler of the Tower (1966) - Strangler
