= Herbert Fux =

Austrian actor (1927–2007)

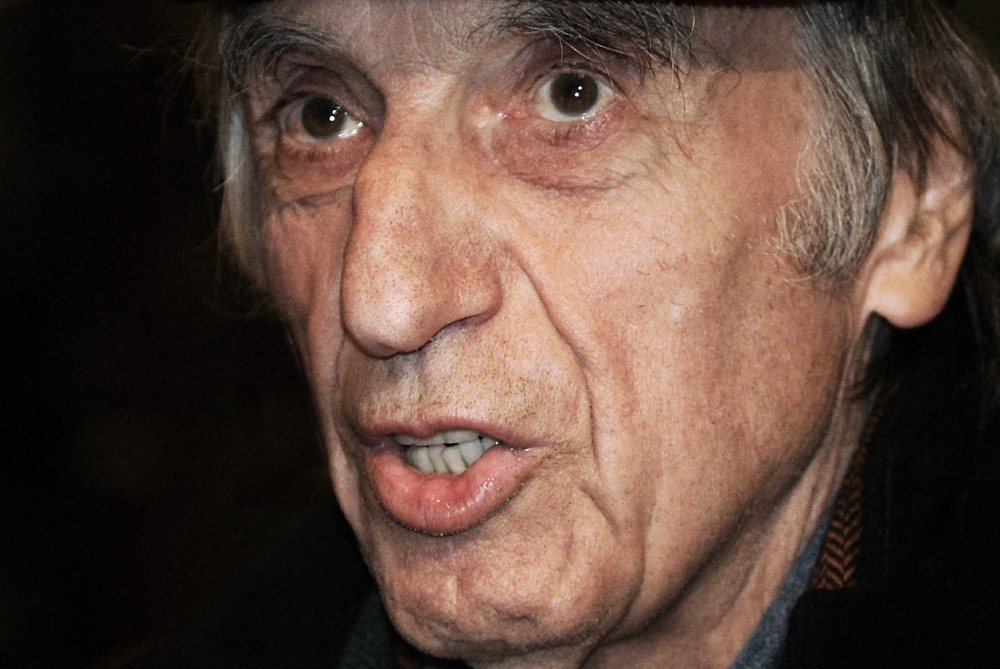
- Fux in November 2006
- Born: 25 March 1927; Hallein, Austria
- Died: 13 March 2007 (aged 79); Zürich, Switzerland
- Occupation: Actor
- Years active: 1960–2007

Herbert Fux (25 March 1927 – 13 March 2007) was an Austrian film actor and politician. He appeared in more than 140 films between 1960 and 2007.

== Life ==
Fux was born in Hallein, at the age of five he moved with his family to the city of Salzburg, where his stepfather worked as a board member of the Landestheater. Having passed his matura exams under the circumstances of late World War II in 1944, he studied at the Salzburg Mozarteum University and began a career as a theatre actor.

From the 1960s, Fux appeared on the screen, later also on television, often performing as villain in numerous B movies and crime films but also Spaghetti Westerns and even Bavarian porn films. The huge number of Fux' appearances in about 120 film and 300 TV productions, also under the direction of renowned filmmakers, included a wide range of secondary parts, often distinctive, quirky characters. During his long career, he worked with directors like Michael Anderson, Christian-Jaque, Wolfgang Staudte, Volker Schlöndorff, Franz Antel, Ingmar Bergman, and Werner Herzog as well as with famous actors such as Klaus Kinski, Udo Kier, Vincent Price, and Ulrich Matthes.

Fux died at the age of 79 with the help of the Swiss euthanasia association Dignitas in Zürich, Switzerland.

== Politics ==
In 1977 Fux was among the founders of a citizens' initiative against commercialization and uglification of Salzburg's historic townscape and became an elected member of the city council. In 1982 he and others established the Austrian United Greens party (Vereinte Grüne Österreichs, VGÖ), which in 1986 merged into the Green Alternative (Grüne Alternative). Fux was elected MP of the Austrian National Council in the 1986 legislative election, he retained his seat until December 1988 and again entered into parliament in November 1989. In November 1990 he retired and later served as culture committee chairman in his hometown Salzburg.

== Selected filmography ==
- The Good Soldier Schweik (1960), as Man at Door (uncredited)
- Geständnis einer Sechzehnjährigen (1961)
- The Secret Ways (1961), in a minor role (uncredited)
- … und du mein Schatz bleibst hier (1961), as Dancing bystander (uncredited)
- Man in the Shadows (1961), as Hofleitner
- Jedermann (1961), as Knecht
- The Elusive Corporal (1962), as Surveyor directing two men working with measuring tape (uncredited)
- Der rote Rausch (1962), as Truck Driver
- Adorable Julia (1962), as Inspizient am Theater
- Lulu (1962), as guest at night club (uncredited)
- Waldrausch (1962), as Bauführer Seidl
- Romance in Venice (1962), as Servant at Villa in Venice
- Mariandl's Homecoming (1962), as Policeman
- The Bandit and the Princess (1962), as Hahn
- The Black Cobra (1963), as Marco
- Maskenball bei Scotland Yard – Die Geschichte einer unglaublichen Erfindung (1963), as Policeman
- Is Geraldine an Angel? (1963)
- Im singenden Rössel am Königssee (1963), as Tankwart (uncredited)
- The Invisible Terror (1963), as Rocco
- Tim Frazer and the Mysterious Mister X (1964), as Man with sunglasses (uncredited)
- Condemned to Sin (1964) (uncredited)
- Geissel des Fleisches (1965), as Alexander Jablonsky
- Congress of Love (1966), as Secretary of Von Gentz (uncredited)
- Killer's Carnival (1966), as Thug #2 (Vienna segment) (uncredited)
- Liselotte of the Palatinate (1966), as Lorraine's Butler
- The Quiller Memorandum (1966), as Oktober's Man (Man with pipe) (uncredited)
- Das Mädchen mit dem sechsten Sinn (1966), as Jakob, Chauffeur
- Funeral in Berlin (1966), as Artur
- Wilder Reiter GmbH (1967), as Kim
- Death Trip (1967), as Eddie Shapiro
- Hotel Clausewitz (1967), as Dr. Schlack
- Das Kriminalmuseum: Teerosen (1967, TV Series), as Ferry
- Dead Run (1967), as Dr. Harold
- Hot Pavements of Cologne (1967), as Stefan
- The House of 1,000 Dolls (1967), as Abdu
- Operation St. Peter's (1967), as Targout
- Die Verwundbaren (1967)
- Assignment K (1968), as Bavarian Tourist (uncredited)
- Beyond the Law (1968), as Eustaccio / Denholm
- The Long Day of Inspector Blomfield (1968), as Blincky Smith
- 69 Liebesspiele (1968), as Gover
- Anzio (1968), as Officer on Phone (uncredited)
- Andrea the Nympho (1968), as Felix
- The Gorilla of Soho (1968), as Mr. Sugar
- Three-Cornered Bed (1969), as Seaman
- Dead Body on Broadway (1969), as Butler Robin
- Kommissar X – Drei goldene Schlangen (1969), as Fingers, Killer #1
- Hate Is My God (1969), as Killer
- The Castle of Fu Manchu (1969), as Governor (uncredited)
- Die Neffen des Herrn General (1969), as Butler
- Köpfchen in das Wasser, Schwänzchen in die Höh’ (1969)
- Champagner für Zimmer 17 (1969), as Dr. Edmund Caspari
- Angels of the Street (1969), as Holleck
- Kuckucksei im Gangsternest (1969), as Lord Kaputt
- Revenge (1969), as Killer
- Eugenie… The Story of Her Journey into Perversion (1970), as Hardin (uncredited)
- Mark of the Devil (1970), as Jeff Wilkens - Executioner
- Schwarzer Nerz auf zarter Haut (1970), as Dr. Dahl
- Hänsel und Gretel verliefen sich im Wald (1970), as Knecht
- Gentlemen in White Vests (1970), as Luigi Pinelli
- Love, Vampire Style (1970), as Engelmann
- Strogoff (1970), as Pope (uncredited)
- Ritter Orgas muß mal wieder (1970), as Ritter Orgas
- Das haut den stärksten Zwilling um (1971), as Herbert
- Aunt Trude from Buxtehude (1971), as Harry, der Hoteldieb
- Einer spinnt immer (1971), as Ganove
- Ore di terrore / Kreuzfahrt des Grauens (1971), as Prof. Martin
- Kreuzfahrt des Grauens (1971), as Martin
- Lady Frankenstein (1971), as Tom
- Das Messer (1971, TV miniseries), as Smith
- The Young Seducers 2 (1972), as Macky, the murderer at the beach
- Sonny and Jed (1972), as Merril
- À la guerre comme à la guerre (1972), as Lawrientieff
- Trouble with Trixie (1972), as Polizist
- Le Sex Shop (1972), as M. Henri
- Escape to the Sun (1972)
- Night Flight from Moscow (1973), as Gardener
- Little Funny Guy (1973)
- Pan (1973)
- Abenteuer eines Sommers (1973)
- Der Teufel in Miss Jonas (1974), as the Devil
- Undine 74 (1974), as Hotelangestellter
- Der kleine Doktor (1974, TV Series), as Louis
- The Odessa File (1974), as Make-up man (uncredited)
- Auf ins blaukarierte Himmelbett (1974), as Briefträger
- Pogled iz potkrovlija (1974), as Mr. Miller
- Trinity Plus the Clown and a Guitar (1975), as Leader of the Badmen
- Der Kumpel läßt das Jucken nicht (1975), as Pimp
- The Lost Honour of Katharina Blum (1975), as Weninger
- Ich denk’ mich tritt ein Pferd (1975)
- Josefine Mutzenbacher – Wie sie wirklich war: 1. Teil (1976), as Herr Rudolf (voice, uncredited)
- Jack the Ripper (1976), as Charlie, the Fisherman
- The Elixirs of the Devil (1976)
- 21 Hours at Munich (1976, TV Movie), as Shorr
- Rosemary's Daughter (1976), as Vokurka
- The Chinese Miracle (1977), as Menzel
- Love Letters of a Portuguese Nun (1977), as Satan
- Lady Dracula (1977) (uncredited)
- Women in Hospital (1977)
- The Expulsion from Paradise (1977), as Cinematographer
- Three Swedes in Upper Bavaria (1977), as Pfarrer
- The Serpent's Egg (1977) (uncredited)
- Ein echter Wiener geht nicht unter (1977, TV Series), as Policeman
- Die Beichte der Josefine Mutzenbacher (1978), as Wirt (voice, uncredited)
- The Uranium Conspiracy (1978), as Ulrich
- Popcorn and Ice Cream (1978), as Priest
- Zwei Däninnen in Lederhosen (1979), as Calafati
- Goetz von Berlichingen of the Iron Hand (1979), as Bauer Sievers
- Himmel, Scheich und Wolkenbruch (1979), as Number One
- Son of Hitler (1979), as Older Tramp
- Missile X – Geheimauftrag Neutronenbombe (1979)
- Cola, Candy, Chocolate (1979), as Pfarrer Herbert
- Woyzeck (1979), as Unteroffizier
- Zwei tolle Käfer räumen auf (1979)
- Austern mit Senf (1979)
- Why the UFOs Steal Our Lettuce (1980)
- Zärtlich, aber frech wie Oskar (1980), as Pfarrer
- Auf Achse (1980, TV Series), as Schani
- Egon Schiele – Exzess und Bestrafung (1980), as Gendarm
- Years Passed (1981, TV film), as Stroffer
- Der Bockerer (1981)
- Dantons Tod (1981, TV film)
- The Mysterious Stranger (1982, TV Movie), as Hans Katzenyammer
- Ein dicker Hund (1982), as Dr. Uhu
- Die unglaublichen Abenteuer des Guru Jakob (1983), as Wedel
- Plem, Plem – Die Schule brennt (1983), as Siegfried
- Happy Weekend (1983)
- Siggi, the Street Cleaner (1984), as Kroske
- Big Mäc (1985), as Franz Leitner
- Three Crazy Jerks (1987), as Dosser
- Bavaria Blue (1990), as Edi Blecha
- Ilona und Kurti (1991), as Gerichtsvollzieher
- Der Bergdoktor (1992–1998, TV Series), as Mr. Konrad
- Kaisermühlen Blues (1992-2000, TV Series), as Sebesta / Funktionär Sebesta
- Night on Fire (1992), as Eschmann
- Familie Heinz Becker (1993, TV Series), as Taxifahrer
- The Three Musketeers (1993), as Innkeeper
- Großstadtrevier (1994, TV Series), as Knorke
- Du bringst mich noch um (1994), as Playwright
- Stockinger (1996–1997, TV Series), as Michael Fuchs
- Black Flamingos – Sie lieben euch zu Tode (1998)
- Asterix & Obelix Take On Caesar (1999), as Ticketdebus
- Professor Niedlich (2001), as Professor Niedlich
- Feuer, Eis & Dosenbier (2002), as Alm-Öhi
- Silentium (2004), as Taxi driver
- SOKO Kitzbühel (2005, TV Series), as Max Seidel
- Pfarrer Braun (2005, TV Series), as Pater Pankraz
- Agathe kann's nicht lassen (2005, TV Series)
- SOKO Donau (2005, TV Series), as Dolezal
- Vineta (2006), as Fritz Feldmann-See
- Zapping-Alien@Mozart-Balls (2009), as Archbishop
