= The Nylon Noose =

1963 film

- Directed by: Rudolf Zehetgruber
- Written by: Fred Ignor; Thomas Engel
- Produced by: Erwin C. Dietrich
- Starring: Dietmar Schönherr; Helga Sommerfeld; Laya Raki
- Cinematography: Otto Ritter
- Edited by: Anne Demmer
- Music by: Walter Baumgartner
- Production companies: Monachia Zeynfilm; Urania-Filmproduktion
- Distributed by: Europa Film
- Release date: 30 July 1963
- Running time: 81 minutes
- Country: West Germany
- Language: German

The Nylon Noose (German: Die Nylonschlinge) is a 1963 West German mystery crime film directed by Rudolf Zehetgruber and starring Dietmar Schönherr, Helga Sommerfeld and Laya Raki. The film's sets were designed by the art director Albert Bollinger. Filmed in Germany but set in Britain, it was made to imitate the success of the Edgar Wallace Krimi adaptations produced by Rialto Film.

== Synopsis ==
When the lights go up in a Soho striptease joint, the body of an undercover Scotland Yard detective is discovered having been strangled with a noose made of nylon. Another officer, Inspector Harvey is assigned to the case. His investigations take him to the strange Elford Hall, a manor house in the English countryside.

== Cast ==
- Dietmar Schönherr as Inspektor Eric Harvey
- Helga Sommerfeld as Jane Stone
- Laya Raki as Nicole
- Ady Berber as Henry
- Gustav Knuth as Charles Clifton
- Ernst Schröder as G.B. Harrison
- Kurt Beck as Donald Smith
- Hedda Ippen as Mrs. Mabel Wells
- Chris von Loosen as Marilin Wells
- Edi Huber as O'Connor
- Alex Freihart as Sir David Elford
- Walter Kiesler as Van Dorn
- Erwin Parker as Wilkins
- Denys Seiler as Sgt. Masters
- Gustav Kloster as Lord Elford

== Bibliography ==
- Lentz, Harris M. Feature Films, 1960–1969: A Filmography of English-Language and Major Foreign-Language United States Releases. McFarland, 2009.
