= Dunja Rajter =

German singer and actress (born 1946)

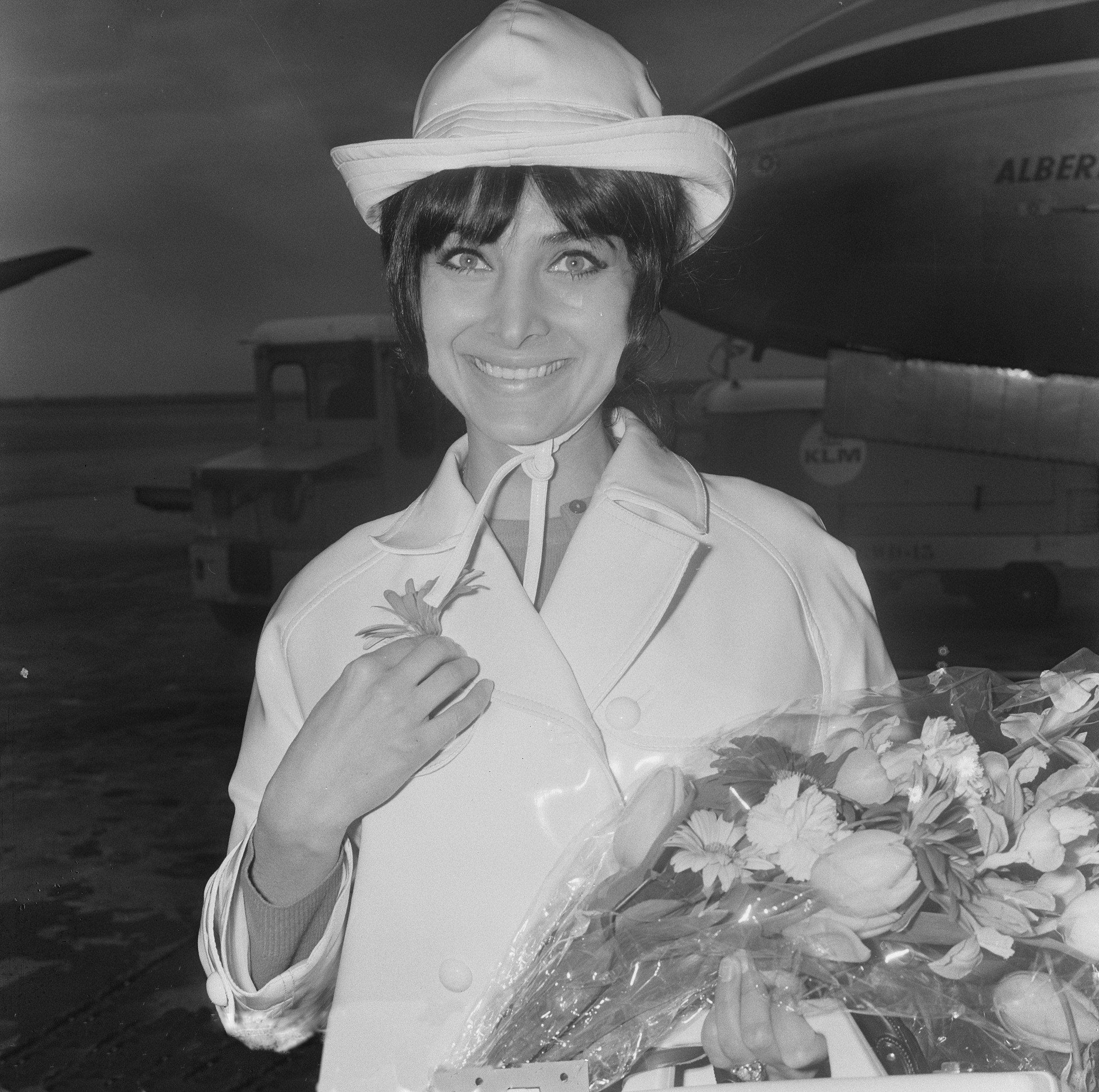
- Dunja Rajter in 1966
- Born: 3 March 1946 (age 80); Našice, Yugoslavia
- Occupations: Actress, singer

Dunja Rajter (born 3 March 1946) is a Croatian-born German singer and actress. She moved to West Germany in 1964 and appeared in film and television. These included the Karl May westerns Apache Gold and Among Vultures. She was married briefly to the Dutch cinematographer Gérard Vandenberg and then the British musician Les Humphries. Since 2009 she is married to marketing consultant Michael Eichler.

== Selected filmography ==
- Apache Gold (1963)
- Among Vultures (1964)
- Teufel im Fleisch (1964)
- The Sinister Monk (1965)
- The Great Happiness (1967)
- Kuckucksjahre (1967)
- St. Pauli Between Night and Morning (1967)
- Das Kriminalmuseum: Teerosen (1967, TV series episode)
- Großer Mann – was nun? (1967–68, TV series, 2 episodes)
- To Grab the Ring (1968)
- Der Kommissar (1970, TV series, 1 episode)
- Zwei himmlische Töchter (1978, TV series, 1 episode)
- Die Brut des Bösen (1979)

== Bibliography ==
- Lentz, Harris M. Feature Films, 1960–1969: A Filmography of English-Language and Major Foreign-Language United States Releases. McFarland, 2009.
