= Ronald Pickup =

British actor (1940–2021)

- Pickup in 'King Lear' BBC Play of the Month (S10.E7) 1975
- Born: Ronald Alfred Pickup; 7 June 1940; Chester, Cheshire, England
- Died: 24 February 2021 (aged 80); Camden, London, England
- Education: University of Leeds; Royal Academy of Dramatic Art
- Occupation: Actor
- Years active: 1964–2021
- Spouse: Lans Traverse (m. 1964)
- Children: 2, including Rachel

Ronald Alfred Pickup (7 June 1940 – 24 February 2021) was an English actor. He was active in television, film, and theatre, beginning with a 1964 appearance in Doctor Who. Theatre critic Michael Billington described him as "a terrific stage star and an essential member of Laurence Olivier's National Theatre company". His major screen roles included the title role in The Life of Verdi (1982) and Prince Yakimov in Fortunes of War (1987).

== Early life and training ==
Pickup was born in Chester on 7 June 1940. His father, Eric, worked as a lecturer; his mother was Daisy (née Williams). Pickup attended the King's School, Chester, and went on to study English at the University of Leeds, graduating in 1962. He then trained at the Royal Academy of Dramatic Art (RADA) in London, receiving the annual Bancroft Medal (silver) on graduation in 1964. He met his wife at RADA and later became a member of the RADA Academy.

== Acting roles ==
=== Television ===
Pickup's television work began with an episode during the first series of Doctor Who (as a physician in part 4 of The Reign of Terror) in 1964. He was paid £30, in what is regarded as the breakthrough in his acting career. He went on to star in the BBC drama series The Dragon's Opponent in 1973, playing Charles Howard, 20th Earl of Suffolk, a World War II bomb disposal expert. In 1976, he appeared in the Thames Television serial Jennie: Lady Randolph Churchill playing Lord Randolph Churchill to Lee Remick's Jennie. The same year he appeared in an adaptation of Jilly Cooper's romance Emily. Almost a decade later, Pickup had the starring role as composer Giuseppe Verdi in the acclaimed The Life of Verdi, written and directed by Renato Castellani.

Pickup appeared opposite Penelope Keith in Moving and as Friedrich Nietzsche in Wagner in 1983; existing in several versions, Wagner has also been released as a film. The following year, Pickup portrayed Jan Tyranowski in the TV movie Pope John Paul II and Albert Einstein in the TV mini series Einstein. He also acted the part of George Orwell in Crystal Spirit: Orwell on Jura; Pickup later revealed in 2012 that this was his favourite role. For this role and a 1983 BBC One adaptation of the play Waters of the Moon, Pickup was nominated for the British Academy Television Award for Best Actor in 1984. He went on to play Prince Yakimov, a hapless, down-at-heel Russo-British aristocrat, opposite Emma Thompson and Kenneth Branagh in the BBC serial Fortunes of War (1987), based on a novel cycle by Olivia Manning. He was the voice of Aslan in the BBC television serial adaptation of The Chronicles of Narnia (1988–1990), derived from the books by C. S. Lewis. Pickup starred in the short lived sit-com Not with a Bang, broadcast in 1990, and appeared opposite Michael Caine in Jekyll & Hyde the same year. In 1992 he appeared alongside Dervla Kirwan in the television adaptation of Melvyn Bragg's book A Time To Dance, considered by some to be one of his best performances.

Pickup's other roles included parts in Hornblower, The Riff Raff Element, Hustle, Foyle's War, Midsomer Murders, Lovejoy, Waking the Dead, The Bill, Silent Witness, Sherlock Holmes, Doc Martin, Inspector Morse, The Rector's Wife, the 1991 television adaptation of John le Carré's A Murder of Quality, and the BBC's 2004 drama for children, Feather Boy. He also appeared in The Ruth Rendell Mysteries series, playing Chief Inspector Moore in "A Case of Coincidence".

Pickup played a regular part, Fraser Cook in the 2004 BBC sitcom The Worst Week of My Life. He starred opposite Judi Dench in the 1989 Channel 4 serial Behaving Badly. In February 2010, he also appeared as Pegleg in the BBC's period drama Lark Rise to Candleford. He played Fr. Moreno Mancini in “Wild Justice”, S5:E2 of Lewis, which aired April 2011.

Pickup appeared in the fifth series of Young Dracula in early 2014, portraying Morgan, chairman of the vampire high council, who later becomes the host of the Blood Seed, the main antagonist of the series finale. He appeared in Holby City as Charles, Lord Byrne, and in November 2014 appeared on Coronation Street in a cameo role as an OAP arranging a birthday party with Michelle Connor in the Rovers Return. Pickup, in 2015, appeared as Sir Michael Reresby an episode of the 6th season of Downton Abbey. In 2016, he played the role of Geoffrey Fisher, the Archbishop of Canterbury, in four episodes of the Netflix series The Crown.

=== Theatre ===
Pickup was also an accomplished stage actor. His first professional role was in 1964 as Friendly in Virtue in Danger at the Phoenix Theatre, Leicester. His London debut was in November 1964 as Octavius in Julius Caesar, for director Lindsay Anderson at the Royal Court Theatre. He worked with Laurence Olivier at the Royal National Theatre, most notably as Baron Tusenbach in Three Sisters (1967) and Long Day's Journey into Night. His first appearance with the company was a minor part in Michael Elliott's production of Miss Julie (1965 Chichester Festival; 1966 Old Vic). This was followed by a role which brought him to popular attention: again at the Old Vic he was Rosalind in Clifford Williams's all-male production of As You Like It, portraying "serious emotion" in an otherwise "comic" production in 1967. He was nominated for a 1998 Laurence Olivier Theatre Award for Best Performance in a Supporting Role for his performance in Amy's View.

Between March and August 2009, Pickup starred as Lucky in Sean Mathias's production of Waiting for Godot by Samuel Beckett opposite Sir Ian McKellen (born 1939) (Estragon), Patrick Stewart (1940–2026) (Vladimir), and Simon Callow (born 1949) (Pozzo). The tour opened in Malvern, Worcestershire, before travelling to Milton Keynes, Brighton, Bath, Norwich, Edinburgh, and Newcastle; its run at the Theatre Royal, Haymarket, was extended due to popular demand.

His last stage appearance was as Mazzini Dunn in Heartbreak House at the Chichester Festival in 2012.

=== Film ===
Pickup appeared as a forger in The Day of the Jackal in 1973. The following year he was seen in Ken Russell's film Mahler, and also appeared in Joseph Andrews in 1977. Pickup played one of the Prussian agents conspiring to blow up the Houses of Parliament in The Thirty Nine Steps (1978).

Pickup played Thomas Cranmer, Archbishop of Canterbury in the BBC Television Shakespeare version of Henry VIII (1979). He played Lt. Harford in Zulu Dawn (1979), Igor Stravinsky in Nijinsky (1980), Prince John in Ivanhoe (1982), and a government official in the James Bond film Never Say Never Again (1983) opposite Sean Connery. He portrayed Portuguese governor Don Hontar in The Mission (1986). Three years later, he played Captain Lancaster, a very strict teacher in Danny, the Champion of the World, and also appeared as a state advocate in A Dry White Season the same year.

Pickup appeared in the film Secret Passage in 2004 alongside John Turturro. The following year, he had a supporting role in the family-based film, The Adventures of Greyfriars Bobby, and the science fiction TV movie Supernova.

Pickup gained international recognition playing one of the main characters, bachelor Norman Cousins, in The Best Exotic Marigold Hotel (2012). He reprised the role in the sequel, The Second Best Exotic Marigold Hotel, released in 2015. In the 2017 film Darkest Hour, Pickup portrayed Prime Minister Neville Chamberlain (replacing John Hurt) as he cedes power to Winston Churchill in the early months of World War II.

== Personal life ==
Pickup married Lans Traverse in 1964 and they had two children: Rachel Pickup, an actress, and Simon Pickup. Ronald and Rachel appeared together in two productions: the Midsomer Murders episode "The Magician's Nephew" (2008), and the motion picture Schadenfreude (2016).

Pickup died on 24 February 2021 following a long illness, aged 80.

== Filmography ==
- Three Sisters (1970) – Baron Nikolaj Tusenbach
- The Day of the Jackal (1973) – The Forger
- Mahler (1974) – Nick
- Joseph Andrews (1977) – Mr. Wilson
- The Thirty Nine Steps (1978) – Bayliss
- Zulu Dawn (1979) – Lt Harford
- Nijinsky (1980) – Igor Stravinsky
- Ivanhoe (1982) – Prince John
- The Letter (1982)
- The Life of Verdi (1982) – Giuseppe Verdi
- Crystal Spirit: Orwell on Jura (TV movie 1983) - George Orwell
- Never Say Never Again (1983) – Elliott
- Wagner (1983) – Friedrich Nietzsche
- Pope John Paul II (1984) – Jan Tryanowski
- Camille (1984) – Jean
- Einstein (1984 TV mini series) – Albert Einstein
- Eleni (1985) – Spiro Skevis
- The Mission (1986) – Hontar
- The Fourth Protocol (1987) – Wynne-Evans
- Testimony (1988) – Marshall Mikhail Tukhachevsky
- The Lion, the Witch and the Wardrobe (1988 TV serial) (1988) - Aslan (voice)
- Danny, the Champion of the World (1989) – Capt. Lancaster
- A Dry White Season (1989) – Louw
- Bethune: The Making of a Hero (1990) – Alan Coleman
- Not with a Bang (1990)
- Kabuto (1991) – Capt. Crawford
- Bring Me the Head of Mavis Davis (1997) – Percy Stone
- Lolita (1997) – Mr. Humbert
- Breathtaking (2000) – Dr. Maclaren
- Evilenko (2004) – Aron Richter
- Secret Passage (2004) – Da Monte
- The Adventures of Greyfriars Bobby (2005) – Cecil Johnson
- A Life in Suitcases (2005) – Monsieur Moitessier
- The Christmas Miracle of Jonathan Toomey (2007) – William McDowell
- Dark Floors (2008) – Tobias
- New Tricks (Season 5, episode 5, 2008) - Sir Wilfred Felspar
- Prince of Persia: The Sands of Time (2010) – King Sharaman
- The Best Exotic Marigold Hotel (2012) – Norman Cousins
- Doc Martin (Season 6, episode 4. 2013) – John Moysey
- The Second Best Exotic Marigold Hotel (2015) – Norman Cousins
- Downton Abbey (Season 6, Episode 3. 2015) – Sir Michael Reresby
- The Crown (2016) – the Archbishop of Canterbury
- The Time of Their Lives (2017) – Frank
- The Rebel (Season 2, Episode 3) (2017) – Dr. Cranmore
- Darkest Hour (2017) – Neville Chamberlain
- The Happy Prince (2018) – Judge
- Stealing Silver (Short) (2018) – Udo
- The Coming of the Martians (2018) – The Curate
- Flicker and go out (Short) (2019) – Mr. Addington
- Summer of Rockets (TV mini-series) (2019) – Walter
- Still Got It (Short) (2019) – Jim
- End of Term (2021) – Damian Self (Posthumous release; Final film role)
