= A Summer in the Country =

Pornographic film

- Directed by: Roberto Girometti; Gérard Loubeau
- Written by: Manlio Capoano (story); Lillo Capoano (screenplay)
- Starring: Gil Lagardère; Jane Baker; Brigitte Lahaie; Lidie Ferdics; Julia Perrin
- Music by: Roberto Pregadio
- Release date: 27 October 1980
- Running time: 103 minutes
- Country: Italy
- Languages: Italian, German, French

A Summer in the Country (German: Ein Sommer auf dem Land) is a 1980 Italian pornographic film directed by Roberto Girometti and Gérard Loubeau. It stars Gil Lagardère, Jane Baker, Brigitte Lahaie, Lidie Ferdics and Julia Perrin. The film is also known by the titles Le segrete esperienze di Luca e Fanny in Italian, Ein Sommer auf dem Lande in German and Ultimate Secrets d'Adolescentes in French.

== Plot ==
15 year old Luca, the son of a wealthy couple arrives at a summer holiday destination a day before anticipated. The couple also host Fanny, a vivacious 16 year old daughter of a couple of friends. Luca's aunt Martha, the strict housekeeper of the Corsican seaside villa constantly scolds and supervises their young and sexy maids Simona and Gina. Both of them have very high sexual appetites and often have sex with strangers whenever they get an opportunity.

That night, Luca and his parents watch the TV in the living room while Fanny reads a book. While switching her posture in the sofa, Fanny unintentionally reveals her panties underneath her skirt which triggers Luca to fantasize them naked, caressing each other and having mutual oral sex. He goes to the Fanny's bedroom and steals a pair of her lingerie, wears them in his bedroom and masturbates. Later Fanny also goes to her bedroom, retrieves an erotic magazine she has hidden under the mattress and masturbates. In the kitchen while dish-washing, Simona and Gina also discuss the sexual adventures each had earlier the day. This only makes them further aroused and Simona suggests they should help each other and the two sneak into their room and have lesbian sex.

Next morning, the maids find Fanny's panties with semen in the crotch area under Luca's bed-sheets and also witness up-skirted Fanny wearing no panties and wrongfully deduce the two teens might have had sex. While Luca's parents assume he has become lazy, sleeping until quite late, he sneaks peaks at Fanny who vigorously masturbates in the toilet. He goes to his room and again wears her lingerie. However, before he starts masturbating, Simona and Gina, who were peeping from outside the window, enter the bedroom. Simona and Gina seduces Luca by taking turns French kissing and fellating him. Aroused, Luca and Simona engage in sexual intercourse while Gina watches them. Fanny continues to masturbate on her bed while looking at her erotic magazine.

Next morning when Luca was missing while the others were enjoying breakfast in the garden, Luca's father sends Gina to fetch him. While Luka tells them to give him a few more minutes from the balcony, Gina caresses his penis and fellates him. Later at night while watching TV, Fanny notices that Luca is continuously looking at Gina's panties while she cleans a stool. The two maids continue their Threesome with Luca to call it a day.

Next day Martha and Fanny play tennis and chess and try to involve Luca, who they thought was bored. Not very interested, Luca asks Simona if they can have sex but Simona insists she needs to do some laundry with Gina and goes to the basement. Following her, Luca finds a frock belonged to Martha from an old chest and poses in-front of a mirror only to be confronted to Fanny. While Fanny strips and wear it herself, Luca narrates that aunt Martha was his first sexual awakening as a kid and that he got his first erection while she was bathing him. He also relates how one night she had to share the bed with him due to party guests staying over night and how Luca up-skirted her and saw his first vagina.

After a two night hiatus, Simona and Gina come to Luca's bedroom and arouse him by telling about how Fanny masturbates every evening while looking at the magazine. While Simona and Luca cuddle together, Gina sneaks into Fanny's bedroom and confronts her while she is masturbating. Gina gradually comforts Fanny and kisses her before giving her a Cunnilingus but not without Simona and Luca watching them from outside the window while having both vaginal and anal sex themselves. Back in Luca's bedroom the two maids continue to arouse Luca by collectively stroking his penis and telling him that Fanny is a Virgin and that he must explore her, but not before the three of them engage in another threesome.

The next day Luca takes courage and convinces Fanny to grant him her virginity. At this point Luca also wants to seduce Martha. He kisses her during a boat ride and takes her to observe a waterfall in the woods and takes the opportunity to seclude himself with her and caress her breasts and kiss her. During the night he goes to her room and Martha passionately blowjobs him before the two have sexual intercourse. Meanwhile unable to find him in his bedroom, Simona and Gina go to Fanny's bedroom and when he's not to be found there also, initiates an erotic lesbian threesome together with Fanny.

In the end, Fanny's parents come back to pick her up and her father, unaware of all these experiences, and decides to capture the moment by taking a photograph of all.

== Cast ==
- Gil Lagardère as Luca
- Jane Baker as Martha
- Brigitte Lahaie as Simona
- Lidie Ferdics as Gina
- Julia Perrin as Fanny
- Guy Bérardant as Simona's Lover
- Piotr Stanislas as Gina's Lover
- Enzo Garinei as Luca's Father
- Daniela Giordano as Luca's Mother
- Aldo Ralli as Fanny's Father
- Annie Carol Edel as Fanny's Mother
