= Sechs Schwedinnen im Pensionat =

1979 film by Erwin C. Dietrich

- DVD cover
- Directed by: Erwin C. Dietrich (as Michael Thomas)
- Written by: Erwin C. Dietrich (Screenplay) (as Manfred Gregor)
- Produced by: Erwin C. Dietrich; Jacques Orth
- Starring: Brigitte Lahaie; Lynn Monteil (as Nadine Pascal); France Lomay (as Aude Mallois); Danielle Troger (as Ella Rose); Kathleen Kane (as Katleen Kane); Elsa Maroussia
- Cinematography: Andreas Demmer; Ruedi Küttel
- Edited by: Claude Guérin
- Music by: Walter Baumgartner
- Production companies: Elite-Film Zürich; Avia-Film Paris
- Distributed by: Ascot Elite Entertainment Group; Filmways Australasian Distributors; Ascot Elite Home Entertainment; Luna Video; Private Screenings
- Release date: September 28, 1979; (Switzerland)
- Running time: 91 min.
- Countries: Switzerland, France
- Language: German

Sechs Schwedinnen im Pensionat (released in the UK as Six Swedish Girls in a Boarding School and in the US as Six Swedes on a Campus) is a 1979 Swiss pornographic film written and directed by Erwin C. Dietrich. It stars Brigitte Lahaie, Lynn Monteil, France Lomay, Danielle Troger, Kathleen Kane and Elsa Maroussia. The film was followed by High Test Girls.

== Plot ==
6 blonde Swedish girls are studying at an elite boarding school. The 7th in their group, Frenchwoman Marie-France, carefully writes down in her diary all the pranks and games of her classmates. And the girls do not deny themselves entertainment, choosing victims both among the male population of the surrounding villages and among the staff of their own school. And everything would have been fine if one of the Swedes, Selma, hadn't fallen behind in all subjects at once. Including sexology. After learning that the girl cannot give up her virginity in any way, her friends decide to resolve this issue at all costs.

== Cast ==
- Brigitte Lahaie as Greta
- Nadine Pascal as Inga
- France Lomay as Kerstin
- Danielle Troger as Lil
- Kathleen Kane as Astrid
- Elsa Maroussia as Selma
- Eric Falk as Karl, der Angler
- Anne Libert as Fräulein Klein

== Reception ==
The website B Movies Heroes said that the film was "a useless movie, but all in all, it's funny if contextualized". Ian Jane from Rock!Shock!Pop also found the movie funny, stating, "Despite the fact that it's quite explicit (though never heads into full on hardcore territory) the best way to describe this movie is fun. There's a goofy, infectious free-spirited feeling to all of this and because of this, we never really question the morality of anyone involved in the naked shenanigans, we just go along for the ride. Everyone involved in the picture seems to be having a great time, and you can very clearly see some completely genuine smiles on the faces of the six female leads as they run (in slow motion, naturally) completely naked through the woods, and in quite a few of the other scenes as well. And of course, those girls are the main reason most would seek this film out – they're all beautiful and while their Swedish roots are certainly more than questionable, it's pretty much impossible not to get a kick out of their antics". Jane also praised the camera work and the "creative cinematography", but panned the film's score, concluding, "There is great camera work featured throughout and some creative cinematography helps to keep things interesting from a framing and composition perspective. The score is repetitive and more than a little familiar to those familiar with his sexploitation output from this period but it works and it suits everything rather well. On top of that, the comedy that is worked into the storyline is actually pretty funny. This one comes together in ways that a lot of similar films don't, and for that reason it's a bit of a softcore classic."
