= Love Letters of a Portuguese Nun =

1977 film

- Film poster
- Directed by: Jesús Franco
- Written by: Mariana Alcoforado (novel)
- Screenplay by: Erwin C. Dietrich; Christine Lembach; Jesús Franco
- Produced by: Erwin C. Dietrich; Max Dora
- Starring: Susan Hemingway; William Berger; Herbert Fux; Ana Zanatti
- Cinematography: Peter Baumgartner
- Edited by: Marie-Luise Buschke (as Marie-Louise Buschke)
- Music by: Walter Baumgartner
- Production companies: Ascot Film; Cinemec Zweite Produktions KG; Elite Film
- Distributed by: Avis Film
- Release date: March 10, 1977 (West Germany)
- Running time: 89 minutes
- Countries: West Germany; Switzerland
- Language: German
- Box office: ESP 36,890,043 (Spain)

Love Letters of a Portuguese Nun (German: Die Liebesbriefe einer portugesischen Nonne) is a 1977 West German-Swiss film directed by Jesús Franco and produced by Erwin Dietrich, loosely based on the Letters of a Portuguese Nun attributed to Mariana Alcoforado. It starred Susan Hemingway, (German actress, born in 1960), and William Berger. Franco co-wrote the screenplay with producer Dietrich.

It tells the story of Maria, a girl in Inquisition-era Portugal, whom a priest sees cavorting with a boy. He orders her to become a nun as penance. In the convent Maria gets subjected to all sorts of torture and humiliation at the hands of the priest and the mother superior.

The movie is part of a genre known as "nunsploitation".

== Cast ==
- Susan Hemingway: Maria Rosalea
- William Berger: Father Vicente
- Herbert Fux: Satan
- Ana Zanatti: Mother Alma, the grand priestess
- Aida Vargas: Juana, a nun (as Aida Kargas)
- Vítor Mendes: António Fernando Queiroz de Melo, the mayor
- Aida Gouveia: Antónia, a nun (as Isa Schneider)
- Herman José: Manuel Gonçalves, the prince (as Hermann Krippahl)
- José Viana: The Grand Inquisitor (as Jose Viana)
- Patricia Da Silva: Maria's mother
- Victor de Sousa: Inquisitor's aid
- Nicolau Breyner: Prince's aid
- Clara Marabuto: Josefina, a nun
- Esther Studer: nun at the ritual
- Dagmar Bürger: nun at the ritual
