= Fascination (1979 film) =

1979 film by Jean Rollin

- Theatrical release poster
- Directed by: Jean Rollin
- Written by: Jean Rollin
- Produced by: Christine Renaud
- Starring: Franca Maï; Brigitte Lahaie; Jean-Marie Lemaire
- Cinematography: Georgie Fromentin
- Edited by: Dominique Saint-Cyr
- Music by: Philippe D'Aram
- Production companies: Comex; Les Films ABC
- Distributed by: Consortium Européen Cinématographique
- Release dates: November 1979 (Germany); 2 January 1980 (France)
- Running time: 82 minutes
- Country: France
- Language: French

Fascination is a 1979 French horror film written and directed by Jean Rollin, and starring Franca Maï, Brigitte Lahaie and Jean-Marie Lemaire. It focuses on a thief who seeks refuge in a remote château where two mysterious women with potentially sinister intentions are residing.

== Plot ==
In April 1905, a group of fashionable Parisian women arrive at an abattoir to drink the blood of an ox as a way to cure anemia, and find the result successful.

Meanwhile, after a successful robbery, Marc, the young leader of a gang of thieves, betrays his four accomplices as he plans to escape to London with the gold coins they have stolen. Chased by his former accomplices, he flees to the countryside and takes refuge in an isolated château inhabited only by two bisexual chambermaids, Elisabeth and Eva, who are awaiting the arrival of the Marchioness and her servants. The women, who appear to be in a romantic relationship, are amused by Marc's presence and assure him they will not turn him in to the police. Eva offers herself to Marc, and the two have sex, sparking Elisabeth's jealousy.

Marc's former accomplices discover his hideout, and a shootout ensues at the château. When Eva goes outside to hand over the gold, the thieves take her to the stables; while two of them count the gold coins, the new leader of the gang forces Eva to give her dress to her wife. The leader then coerces Eva into sex, whereupon she stabs him to death. Armed with a scythe, Eva kills the remaining thieves before calmly returning to the château. Elisabeth tells Marc he can escape before nightfall, but he decides to stay.

That evening, the Marchioness arrives with her servants, and they hold a party in which Marc is the only man, so he gets all the attention. At midnight, the women change into transparent robes, supposedly for a secret ceremony. Since he is still on the run, Marc flees into the stables, looking for a horse he can use to escape. Eva is sent after Marc to bring him back to the château, but Elisabeth intervenes by shooting Eva. Elisabeth and Marc flee while a wounded Eva crawls back to the château, where the servants drain her blood.

In a nearby pigeon loft, Elisabeth explains to Marc that she, Eva and their guests were prescribed ox blood by a doctor as a cure for anemia. However, the women acquired a taste for blood and decided to feast on human blood. They subsequently formed a secret society, luring young men into the château and drinking their blood. Elisabeth admits that she never loved Marc and shoots him dead before tasting his blood. She returns to the château and lies to the Marchioness, claiming that she killed Marc after he killed Eva. The Marchioness tells Elisabeth that she looks beautiful with Marc's blood on her lips.

== Cast ==
- Franca Maï (credited as Franka Mai) as Elisabeth
- Brigitte Lahaie as Eva
- Jean-Marie Lemaire as Marc
- Fanny Magier as Hélène
- Muriel Montosse as Anita
- Sophie Noël as Sylvie
- Evelyne Thomas as Dominique
- Agnès Bert as herself
- Cyril Val (credited as Alain Plumey) as a thief
- Myriam Watteau as the female thief
- Joe De Palmer (credited as Joe De Lara) as a thief
- Jacquel Sansoul as a thief

== Release ==
Fascination was released theatrically in France by the Consortium Européen Cinématographique on 2 January 1980.

=== Critical response ===
Reviewing the film on Blu-ray, Charlie Hobbs of Twitch Film wrote, "Upon my first viewing of this film, I found myself struggling a little bit to remain engaged at first, however, around the halfway point, the film picks up significantly and the third act is a thing of beauty". Budd Wilkins of Slant Magazine, who reviewed the film as part of the five-disc set, wrote, "In Fascination, more than any other film in the set, the sexuality is staged in a manner befitting French erotica".

Steven Jay Schneider, writing in the British Film Institute's Screen Classics book 100 European Horror Films (2019), likens Fascination to the silent films of Louis Feuillade, citing is sparing use of dialogue, adding: "The movie has a delirious dreamlike aura that is hard to shake off afterwards."

=== Home media ===
Image Entertainment released Fascination on DVD in the United States in 1999.

Redemption Films released it on DVD in the United States on 28 October 2008 in its original aspect ratio, with special features including a trailer and stills gallery, and again in 2012.

In 2011, Kino Lorber acquired the Redemption Films catalogue, and released Fascination on Blu-ray in 2012 as part of a five-disc Blu-ray collection, along with La Rose de Fer, La Vampire Nue, Le Frisson des Vampires and Lèvres de Sang. A standalone Blu-ray and DVD were also released by Kino the same year. Wicked-Vision Media released a limited mediabook Blu-ray edition in Germany with three alternate covers in 2019.
