= The Life of Verdi (miniseries) =

- Written by: Leonardo Benvenuti; Renato Castellani; Piero De Bernardi; Gene Luotto
- Directed by: Renato Castellani
- Starring: Ronald Pickup; Carla Fracci; Giampiero Albertini
- Narrated by: Burt Lancaster (English version only)
- Theme music composer: Roman Vlad
- Countries of origin: Italy; France; West Germany; United Kingdom; Sweden
- Original language: Italian

Production
- Cinematography: Giuseppe Ruzzolini
- Editor: Otello Colangeli
- Running time: 630 minutes

Original release
- Release: 13 October – 12 November 1982

The Life of Verdi is a 1982 Italian-language biographical television miniseries directed by Renato Castellani dramatizing the life of Italian composer Giuseppe Verdi. Castellani also co-wrote the original script with Leonardo Benvenuti and Piero De Bernardi. The English version was written by Gene Luotto and narrated by Burt Lancaster. The miniseries first aired in 1982, and was made available on DVD in 2003.

The production stars British actor Ronald Pickup as Giuseppe Verdi, Italian ballet dancer and actress Carla Fracci as Giuseppina Verdi, and Giampiero Albertini as Antonio Barezzi. Funded by a number of European national broadcasting companies, the series is an accurate portrayal of Verdi's life.

According to promotional material for the production, it was "filmed on location in Italy, Leningrad, London, and Paris...(T)his epic mini-series took several years to create, requiring more than 100 actors, 1800 extras, and 4000 costumes."

== Episodes ==
The English version has seven 90-minute episodes totaling 630 minutes; the original Italian version, nine 70-minute episodes.

1. "Childhood, Barezzi & Milan"
2. "Margherita, Tragedy & Nabucco"
3. "Patriotism, I Lombardi & Ernani"
4. "Giuseppina, Revolution & Rigoletto"
5. "Independent Italy, La Traviata & Un Ballo"
6. "Wagner, Teresa & Aida"
7. "Crisis, Otello & Falstaff"

== Cast ==
- Ronald Pickup as Giuseppe Verdi
- Omero Antonutti as Carlo Verdi
- Agla Marsili as Luisa Uttini
- Giampiero Albertini as Antonio Barezzi
- Adriana Innocenti as Maria Barezzi
- Daria Nicolodi as Margherita Barezzi
- Carla Fracci as Giuseppina Strepponi
- Lino Capolicchio as Arrigo Boito
- Enzo Cerusico as Emanuele Muzio
- Eva Christian as Teresa Stolz
- Nino Dal Fabbro as Giulio Ricordi
- Jan Niklas as Angelo Mariani
- Renzo Palmer as Camillo Benso, Count of Cavour
- Raimondo Penne as Francesco Maria Piave
- Tito Schipa Jr. as Franco Faccio
- Nanni Svampa as Impresario Merelli
- Milena Vukotic as Clara Maffei
- Ugo Bologna as Gaetano Donizetti
- Giorgio Trestini as Temistocle Solera
- Leopoldo Trieste as Finola
- Carlo Colombo as Giovannino Barezzi
