= High Test Girls =

1980 film by Erwin C. Dietrich

- Film poster
- Directed by: Erwin C. Dietrich (as Michael Thomas)
- Written by: Erwin C. Dietrich (screenplay) (as Manfred Gregor); Melvin Quiñones (dialogue) (as Mel Quinones)
- Produced by: Erwin C. Dietrich
- Starring: Brigitte Lahaie; Jane Baker; Nadine Pascal; France Lomay (as Francette Maillol); Flore Sollier (as Ella Rose); Élodie Delage; (as Elodie Delage)
- Cinematography: Peter Baumgartner
- Edited by: Marie-Luise Buschke
- Music by: Walter Baumgartner
- Production company: Elite-Film AG Zürich
- Distributed by: Ascot Elite Entertainment Group; Filmways Australasian Distributors; SRC Films; Filmways Home Video; Private Screenings
- Release date: September 19, 1980; (Switzerland)
- Running time: 85 minutes
- Country: Switzerland
- Language: German

High Test Girls (German: Sechs Schwedinnen von der Tankstelle) is a 1980 Swiss pornographic film co-written and directed by Erwin C. Dietrich. It stars Brigitte Lahaie, Jane Baker, Nadine Pascal, France Lomay, Flore Sollier and Élodie Delage. The film is a sequel to Sechs Schwedinnen im Pensionat.

== Plot ==
Six young Swedish girls, who caused so much mischief in the girls' boarding school, are transferred to professional life where they are assigned to operate a restaurant with a filling station. One morning a traveler visits them and rings the bell continuously. Kerstin, Inga & Greta all are having sex in their respective rooms while Astrid is doing some cardio, riding her exercise bicycle. Only Lil who was masturbating while watching TV hears and attends to him. While the car is being filled, she accompanies him inside and they have sex on the sofa. Concomitantly, the two TV announcers also start to have sex. Time passes by and the petrol reaches the brim of the tank and overflows.

In the municipality, Mayor Hans discusses the situation with his wife Marie who insists he should monitor the girls vigilantly. He then attends a meeting with the town officials. As soon as he leaves, Marie lures a town council member who is also supposed to attend the meeting with the Mayor and they have sex in the Mayor's office. The official then rushes to the meeting which has been delayed because of his absence. The meeting commences and they discuss the behavior of the six girls which poses a threat to morality of the town and it is decided to get rid of the girls.

However, the sexual encounters continue as Kerstin and Inga lure a couple of guys and have sex with them and Kerstin proceeds to have sex with the TV with audio guidance by the announcer. In the municipality, when the mayor goes out again for a meeting, Marie lures the town's mechanic Harry into her bedroom and they have sex. At the meeting the mayor decides to hire a lawyer since the girls have legally inherited the land and property. Meanwhile Greta and Kerstin help their clients unwind with refreshments and a game of Ludo prior to having sex. While watching TV the girls see a man dressed as Santa Claus making a lever device which the girls feel might come in handy. Kerstin, a physics major, modifies Astrid's exercise bicycle by affixing a dildo which works as you pedal. All the girls try it and enjoy it immensely and then go out for a naked jog in the wilderness. The town's butcher, mechanic, school teacher, congressman and the mayor pursue them and take a sneak peek using binoculars.

While Inga accompanies a tired client to have sex, Greta and Kerstin identifies as bisexual while having a smoke. They decide to affirm their new found orientation and engage in lesbian sex. In the municipality, Marie blames the mayor for still not getting rid of the girls and this time has sex with the butcher while the mayor has departed to attend the next town meeting. In view of the numerous complaints received by the town elders, they agree to collect concrete evidence. But the girls continue with their sexual frolics more vigorously than ever before. They have multiple visitors in the lobby and Greta lures a very long distance client and they have sex. Before their next meeting, Marie has sex with the school teacher. In this meeting, the officials are disturbed by the deteriorating municipality building and worry that the town's philharmonic orchestra who is scheduled to perform in the town festival in two weeks should be shifted to another location. The most feasible option is to move the event to the filling station due to its large floor area.

The following day, the musicians who include the butcher, mechanic, school teacher, congressman and the mayor arrive. They shift the furniture in the lobby and start practicing the overture as conducted by the senior band leader. However, the musicians one by one sneak into the rooms of the girls, get acquainted with them and have passionate sex.

== Cast ==
- Brigitte Lahaie as Greta
- Nadine Pascal as Inga
- France Lomay as Kerstin
- Flore Sollier as Lil
- Élodie Delage as Astrid
- Elsa Maroussia as Selma
- Jane Baker as Marie, the mayor's wife
- Karl Gysling as Hans, the mayor
- Roman Huber as Harry, the mechanic
- Eric Falk as the butcher
- Will Stoer as male TV announcer
- Barbara Moose as female TV announcer

== Reception ==
The website B Movies Heroes found the film worse than its predecessor, stating, "The good Erwin C. Dietrich creates a cheerful comedy soft-core, which has no great pretensions technical or narrative. There is no doubt, Sechs Schwedinnen von der Tankstelle is more absurd than its predecessor". The French blog Alligatographe criticized almost every aspect of the film and concluded, "With no meanings, no talent, no scenario and no comedians, the film bores most of the time".
