= Women in Cellblock 9 =

1977 film

- Film poster
- Directed by: Jesús Franco
- Written by: Erwin C. Dietrich
- Produced by: Erwin C. Dietrich
- Starring: Karine Gambier
- Edited by: Jesús Franco
- Music by: Walter Baumgartner
- Production company: Elite Film
- Distributed by: Elite Film
- Release date: 17 March 1978 (West Germany)
- Running time: 75 minutes
- Country: Switzerland
- Language: English

Women in Cellblock 9 (German: Frauen für Zellen-Block 9, lit. 'Women for Cell-Block 9') is a 1978 Swiss women in prison film directed by Jesús Franco.

== Plot ==
The film is set in a South American jungle prison during a revolution and starts with the camp's warden and its physician (Dr Costa), waiting at a roadblock for a truck. On board are six young women, three of whom are suspected of revolutionary activities, who are arrested (the other three are made available to the guards to be raped). The three detainees, Karine, Barbara and Aida, are taken to the notorious Cellblock 9 where they are chained naked, with collars around their necks. One by one they are interrogated by Dr Costa and the warden, using various torture methods. Barbara and Aida resist the torture and remain silent, but Karine breaks down and provides information.

In the meantime, a young student called Marie is also bought to the cellblock, as allegedly propaganda material was found on her. She was forced to spend three days without food and water in a single cell, before she is invited to dinner and forced to have oral sex with the warden in order to get a sip of salty Champagne.

After the four women in Cellblock 9 again are forging among themselves, they devise a plan to contact their contacts in the capital. The quartet manages to distract the guard in order to knock him out and flee with his rifle. Shortly after leaving the cellblock, Aida is killed in a gunfight with another guard who is also killed. The other three flee into the jungle, where Barbara has been shot and they progress slowly. They make it to an old temple, where they feel safe and remove the bullet from Barbara's shoulder. Karine and Marie go into the jungle to look for food, but the guards find their trail and meet them at the temple. As Barbara is killed, the other two, alerted by her screams, run back to the temple and are suddenly confronted by the camp commander and the doctor (surrounded by prison guards). In a last desperate action Karine attempts to steal the commander's pistol. When she fails to pull the trigger, the commander gives the order to fire and the last two prisoners are struck down on the spot. With the desecration of the corpses, the film ends.

== Cast ==
- Karine Gambier as Karine
- Howard Vernon as Dr. Milton
- Susan Hemingway as Maria
- Aida Gouveia as Aida Moret
- Esther Studer as Barbara
- Dora Doll as Loba
- Cesar Anahory as Guard

== Release ==
Women in Cellblock 9 was released theatrically in Germany on March 17, 1978. It was released on home video under other English-language titles including Tropical Inferno in Switzerland, Woman of Cellblock 9 in Japan and Woman from Jail Dep. No 9 in West Germany.

In the United Kingdom, the film was refused classification by the British Board of Film Classification (BBFC) in February 2004, with the board citing potential legal issues under the Video Recordings Act 1984, as well as pending updates made to the Protection of Children Act 1978 in England and Wales (under the Sexual Offences Act 2003) set to take effect in May 2004, as issues prohibiting the classification of the film.

== Reception ==
A retrospective review states that "The story for this one is just like all the other films from the time period. We find pretty, young women who are forced to be nude most of the film and are degraded physically, mentally, and sexually. The story is one tracked and leaves very little for the viewer to grab hold of. The film moves as a snails pace and the dialogue is very tedious." The same review adds that this film is one of the rare films by Franco the author would not recommend.
