= Ulrich Falk =

Swiss judoka

Personal information
- Nationality: Swiss
- Born: 14 August 1950 (age 74)
- Occupation: Judoka

Sport
- Sport: Judo

Ulrich Falk (born 14 August 1950) is a Swiss judoka. He competed in the men's open category event at the 1972 Summer Olympics.
