= Walter Baumgartner =

Swiss mid-20th century film composer

- Born: 16 November 1904; Sevelen, Switzerland
- Died: 3 October 1997 (aged 92); Zollikerberg, Switzerland
- Occupation: Composer
- Years active: 1947–1990 (film)
- Spouse: Helen Vita (m. 1956)

Walter Baumgartner (16 November 1904 – 3 October 1997) was a Swiss film composer. He scored over ninety films, working in his later years with the producer-director Erwin C. Dietrich. His nephew was the cinematographer Peter Baumgartner. He was married to the Swiss actress Helen Vita from 1956 until his death.

== Selected filmography ==
- Palace Hotel (1952)
- The Venus of Tivoli (1953)
- The Nylon Noose (1963)
- The Strangler of the Tower (1966)
- Bed Hostesses (1973)
- Frauengefängnis (1975)
- Love Letters of a Portuguese Nun (1977)
- Ilsa, the Wicked Warden (1977)
- Women in Cellblock 9 (1977)
- Sechs Schwedinnen im Pensionat (1979)
- High Test Girls (1980)

== Bibliography ==
- Cowie, Peter; Elley, Derek (1977). World Filmography: 1967. Fairleigh Dickinson University Press.
