= Ingrid Steeger =

German actress and comedian (1947–2023)

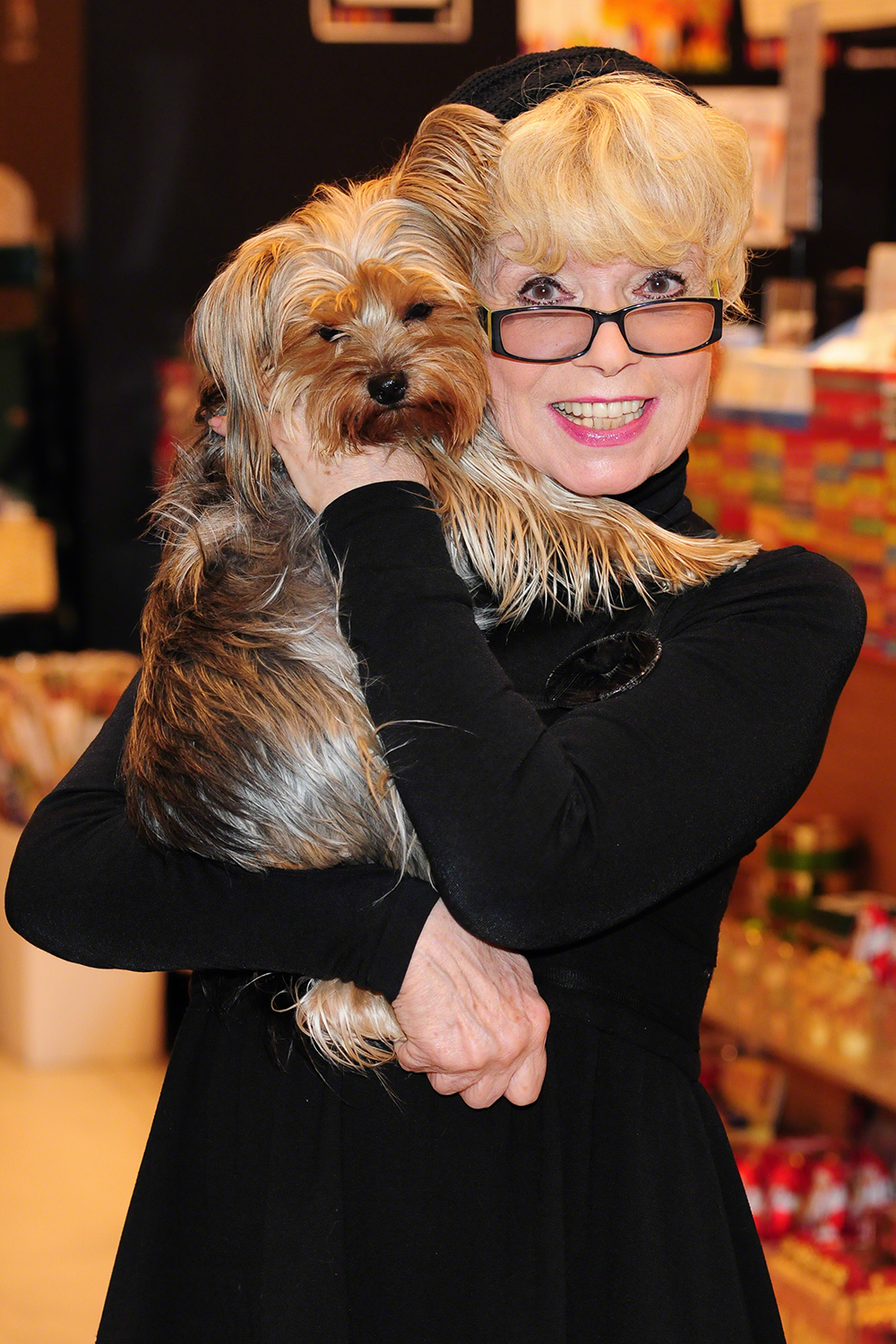
- Steeger in 2013
- Born: Ingrid Anita Stengert; 1 April 1947; Berlin, Germany
- Died: 22 December 2023 (aged 76); Bad Hersfeld, Hesse, Germany
- Burial place: Stahnsdorfer Südwestkirchhof
- Other names: Klimbim-Familie
- Occupation(s): Actress, comedian
- Years active: 1966–2006
- Height: 1.59 m (5 ft 3 in)

Ingrid Steeger (German: [ˈɪŋ.ɡʁiːt ˈʃteː.gɐ]; 1 April 1947 – 22 December 2023) was a German actress and comedian. From 1966 to 2006 she appeared in around 100 films and television productions.

== Life and career ==
Steeger was born in Berlin on 1 April 1947. She worked as a comedian and actress in Germany. After she was discovered as a secretary for modeling she became famous in her role as Gaby Klimbim in Michael Pfleghar's 1973-1979 comedy TV show Klimbim in the 1970s. She made the transition from soft porn actress to comedian.

Steeger dated Pfleghar from 1974 to 1979, lived in Munich, and was married twice.

Ingrid Steeger was committed to animal welfare, supported a Chiemgau animal sanctuary for animal veterans and an association for the repatriation of lost dogs. She also liked to help the mentally disabled, children with AIDS and the homeless.

== Death ==
At the time of her death, she was living in an apartment in the Munich district of Schwabing with her dog, a little Yorkshire terrier named Eliza Doolittle. She died from an intestinal obstruction on 22 December 2023, at the age of 76. Steeger was buried on 17 January in the Stahnsdorfer Südwestkirchhof near Berlin, according to her wish, under a tree.

== Filmography ==
- 1966: Living It Up
- 1968: The Gorilla of Soho
- 1969: The Swingin' Pussycats
- 1970: Die liebestollen Baronessen
- 1970: Ich – ein Groupie
- 1971: The Body in the Thames
- 1971: The Sex Adventures of the Three Musketeers
- 1971: The Lustful Turk
- 1971: The Young Seducers
- 1971: Ehemänner-Report
- 1971: Die goldene Banane von Bad Porno
- 1971: The Swingin' Stewardesses
- 1971: Sonne, Sylt und kesse Krabben (Nackte Liebe im heißen Sand)
- 1971: The Night Driver
- 1972: Bed Hostesses
- 1972: Lonely Wives
- 1972: Bettkarriere
- 1972: The Young Seducers 2
- 1972: Hochzeitsnacht-Report
- 1972: Mädchen, die nach München kommen
- 1972: Massagesalon der jungen Mädchen
- 1972: Schulmädchen-Report 4 – Was Eltern oft verzweifeln läßt
- 1972: Nurse Report
- 1972: The Calendar Girls
- 1973: Housewives on the Job (Hausfrauenreport international)
- 1973: Love in 3-D (Liebe in drei Dimensionen)
- 1973: Der Kommissar (TV series): "Das Komplott"
- 1973: Schulmädchen-Report 5 – Was Eltern wirklich wissen sollten
- 1973: Junge Mädchen mögens heiß, Hausfrauen noch heißer (Mädchen komm, die Liebe juckt)
- 1973: Der Liebesmarkt
- 1974: Ein langer Ritt nach Eden
- 1973–1979: Klimbim (TV series, 29 episodes)
- 1974: Three Men in the Snow
- 1974: Münchner Geschichten (TV series): "Maulhelden"
- 1975: Derrick (TV series): "Hoffmanns Höllenfahrt"
- 1978: Zwei himmlische Töchter (TV miniseries)
- 1980: Susi (TV miniseries, 6 episodes)
- 1985: Andre Handles Them All
- 1985: Glücklich geschieden (TV, as voice of Robert Atzorn's dog)
- 1986: Warten auf Hugo
- 1987: Derrick (TV series): "Absoluter Wahnsinn"
- 1988: Wilder Westen inclusive (TV miniseries)
- 1990: Der neue Mann (TV series)
- 1990: Pension Corona (TV series)
- 1993: The Great Bellheim (TV miniseries)
- 1995: Zwei alte Hasen (TV series): "Grandhotel"
- 1995: Corinna (TV series): "Der Quacksalber"
- 1996: Rosamunde Pilcher – Eine besondere Liebe (TV film)
- 1996: Großstadtrevier (TV series): "Der blonde Engel"
- 1999–2001: Freunde fürs Leben (TV series, 12 episodes)
- 1999: Die blaue Kanone (TV film)
- 1999: Ein Fall für zwei (TV series): "Blutige Noten"
- 2000: Paul Is Dead
- 2003: Die Anrheiner (TV series): "Beste Freunde"
- 2000: SOKO 5113 (TV series): "Leichte Beute"
- 2002: Klinikum Berlin Mitte (TV series): "Die grüne Fee"
- 2002: Gute Zeiten, schlechte Zeiten (TV series, 2 episodes)
- 2003: Bewegte Männer (TV series): "Die Nacht vor der Hochzeit"
- 2004: Edel & Starck (TV series): "Eine Landpartie"
- 2004: Unser Charly (TV series): "Charly und die Zebrafrau"
- 2004: Crazy Race 2 – Warum die Mauer wirklich fiel (TV film)
- 2006: Goldene Zeiten

== Awards ==
- 1975: Bravo Otto in Bronze for TV star
- 1976: Bravo Otto in Silver
- 1976: Goldene Kamera by TV magazine Hörzu
- 1977: Bravo Otto in silver
- 1978: Bravo Otto in gold
- 1990: Bambi
- 2003: German Comedy Awards
