= Brigitte Lahaie =

French actress (born 1955)

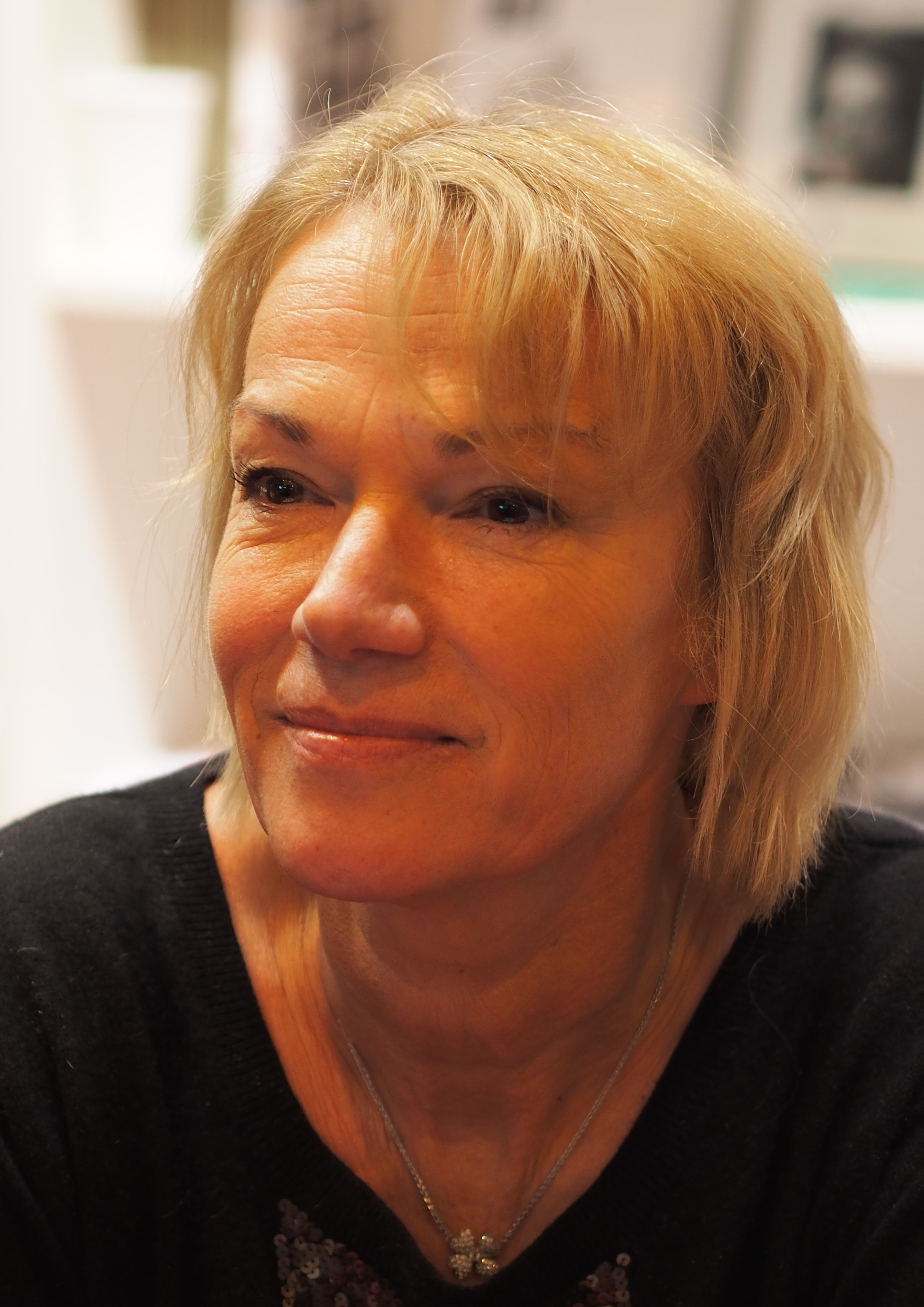
- Lahaie in 2014
- Born: Brigitte Lucie Jeanine Van Meerhaeghe; 12 October 1955 (age 71); Tourcoing, Nord-Pas-de-Calais, France
- Other names: Brigitte Simonin; Fanny; Brigitte Bordeaux; Brigitte Lahaye; Brigitte Van Meerhaegu
- Occupations: Actress, radio host
- Years active: 1976–1995 (pornographic films); 1978–present (film & TV)
- Spouse: Patrick (?-2022)
- Website: brigittelahaie.fr

Brigitte Lahaie (born Brigitte Lucie Jeanine Van Meerhaeghe; 12 October 1955) is a French radio talk show host, mainstream film actress and former pornographic actress. She performed in erotic films from 1976 through 1980 and is a member of the XRCO Hall of Fame.

== Early life and background ==
Brigitte Lucie Jeanine Van Meerhaeghe was born in Tourcoing, France. She left home for Paris when 18 years old, where she started working as a shoe salesgirl. Soon, she was noticed for her physique and accepted a proposal to pose in the nude for erotic magazines.

== Cinema ==
=== Porn ===
She started working at age 20 in the adult film industry in 1976, one year after the legalization of hardcore pornography in France, as "Brigitte Lahaie" and various other stage names. In her first film, she was a body double for another actress' scenes.

Lahaie eventually played in more than one hundred erotic films, most of them hardcore, directed by among many others, Claude Mulot, José Bénazéraf, Gérard Kikoïne, Claude Bernard-Aubert, and Francis Leroi.

She chose to be listed as "Brigitte Lahaie" in most of them, her surname a transfer to French of her Flemish name "vanmeerhaeghe", in which "haeghe" means "hedge", since "la haie" is "the hedge" in French.

=== Horror ===
While she was still working in the adult-movie industry, Jean Rollin, who had directed her in the porn film Vibrations Sensuelles (Sensual Vibrations) in 1976, noticed Lahaie's "distinctly different personality," as he later recalled, and thought she had "incredible charisma." He offered her a role in his 1978 mainstream film, Les Raisins de la Mort (The Grapes of Death), the first gore film produced in France, with Marie-Georges Pascal in the leading role. He then made her the protagonist of his next film, Fascination, in 1979.

=== Mainstream ===
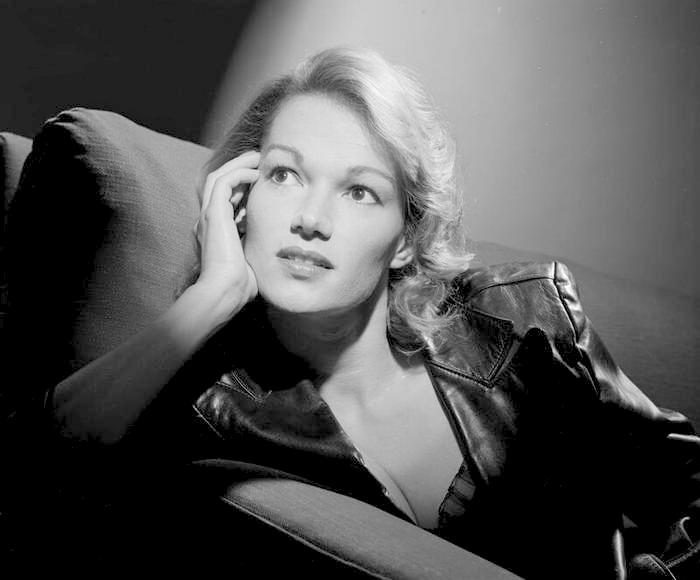
Lahaie in 1988

Lahaie appeared in I as in Icarus (1980), which starred Yves Montand, playing a stripper, in For a Cop's Hide (1981), which starred Alain Delon, in the role of a nurse. She continued to also make softcore and Nazi exploitation movies as well as "video nasties" during this time. In 1987, she played a singer in Michel Denisot's television special "La Plus Belle Nuit du Cinéma" ("The Most Beautiful Night of the Cinema"), transmitted from the Zénith.

The same year, she recorded and released the single "Caresse tendresse" ("Caress tenderness").

According to a 2018 article in Sight & Sound about Jean Rollin, Lahaie plays in his La Nuit des Traquées (Night of the Hunted, 1980) the woman suffering from amnesia with "devastating effect," while she is credited with "lovely, open, untutored performances" for her work in Les Raisins and Fascination.

Lahaie acted in several other mainstream films, including Henry & June (1990) and Calvaire (2004).

== Books and radio ==
Throughout her career, Lahaie published several books, mostly autobiographical, as well as some novels. In the 2000s, she was often featured on the Les Grosses Têtes radio program, broadcast on RTL, while she was also, from 2001, the host of Lahaie, l'Amour et Vous on Radio Monte Carlo, a daily talk show from 14:00 to 16:00 that dealt mostly with love and sex. The show ended in 2016, with the station praising her work on the subject of sexuality as "unique" in terms of success and longevity.

== Personal life ==
Lahaie has no children.

She is a fan of equestrianism, an interest reportedly first inspired when she saw the film White Mane as a teenager. She commentated live on the equestrian events at the 2012 London Olympics for RMC.

== Sexual violence and consent ==
In the aftermath of the Harvey Weinstein scandal and the subsequent Me Too movement, one hundred women in France signed, on 9 January 2018, a public declaration in which they denounced what they claimed was a return to "puritanism" that "actually serves the interests of the enemies of sexual freedom, the religious extremists, the worst reactionaries." Lahaie was a co-signatory of that declaration, along with other celebrities such as Catherine Deneuve, Ingrid Caven, and Catherine Millet. Lahaie went on a TV debate the same evening, where she stated that women could have an orgasm when being raped. A few months later, in May, Lahaie stated, in interviews and on television, that her comment was "taken out of context," that she "does not regret [it]", and that she never supported non-consensual sex or violence of any kind against women.

== Filmography ==
=== Film ===
Year	Title	Role	Notes
1970	Frissons africains		Credited as Brigitte Deslages; English title: Africa Erotica
1977	Jouir jusqu'au délire	Annie	
1977	Couples en chaleur	The saleswoman	
1977	Vibrations sexuelles	The psychiatrist	
1977	Suprêmes jouissances	Doris	English title: Exquisite Pleasure
1977	Les plaisirs fous	Claude	
1977	Chaleurs intimes	Anneer	Uncredited
1977	Sarabande porno		
1977	Parties fines	Baroness Solange	Credited as B. Lahaye; English title: Education of the Baroness
1977	Entrecuisses	Patricia	
1977	Cathy, fille soumise	Mélanie	
1977	C'est la fête à mon cul		
1977	Arrête, tu me déchires		
1977	La face cachée d'Hitler		
1977	Je suis une belle salope	Marianne	English title: Illusions within Girls
1978	Rentre c'est bon	The cousin	
1978	Bordel SS		
1978	Inonde mon ventre	Lise	English title: Night Fever
1978	Caresses Infernales		
1978	Le bijou d'amour	Gordonna	
1978	La rabatteuse	Jocelyne	
1978	Touchez pas au zizi	Karen	
1978	Je suis à prendre	Hélène	English title: I'm Yours to Take
1978	Les grandes jouisseuses	Marianne	
1978	Étreintes		
1978	Bouches expertes	Claudine	
1978	Cuisses infernales	Jocelyne	
1978	Chaude et perverse Emilia		
1978	La mouillette		
1978	Blondes humides		
1978	Les raisins de la mort	The blond woman	Credited as Brigitte Lahaye; English title: The Grapes of Death
1978	Prends-moi de force	Brigitte	
1978	Tout pour jouir	The make-up girl	English title: The Window of Pleasure
1978	Excès pornographiques	Marie-Christine	
1978	Ondées brûlantes	Brigitte	
1978	Langues cochonnes		English title: Sex Roulette
1978	Festival érotique		
1978	Viol, la grande peur	Veterinary student	Credited as Brigitte Lahaye
1978	La clinique des fantasmes	Marilyn Richards	English title: Rx for Sex
1978	Porno roulette		
1978	Les chattes		English Title: Female Cats
1979	La Vitrine du plaisir		
1979	Le chouchou de l'asile	Chief warden	
1979	Couple cherche esclave sexuel	Barbara	English title: Serviced with a Smile
1979	New Generation		
1979	Une femme spéciale		Uncredited
1979	Je brûle de partout	Lorna	
1979	Estivantes pour homme seul	Mélanie	
1979	Anna cuisses entrouvertes		
1979	Parties chaudes	Hélène	
1979	Photos scandale	Juliette	
1979	Auto-stoppeuses en chaleur	Denise, the girl who escapes	Credited as Brigitte Lahaye
1979	Soumission	Madam Clarisse	Credited as Brigitte Lahaye; English title: The House of Fantasies
1979	La grande mouille	A hunter	English title: Hot and Horny
1979	Sechs Schwedinnen im Pensionat	Greta	
1979	Tremblements de chair		
1979	Fascination	Eva	
1979	Pénétrez-moi par le petit trou	Christiane	
1979	Cette malicieuse Martine	A client of uncle	Credited as Brigitte Bordeaux
1979	I comme Icare	Ursula Hoffmann, stripper	English title: I as in Icarus
1979	L'histoire des 3 petits cochons		
1980	Les petites garces	A swinger	
1980	The Colonel's Nieces	Julia	English titles: Come Play with Me 2; Secrets of a French Maid
1980	Pénétrations méditerranéennes	Brigitte	
1980	Gefangene Frauen	Rita	
1980	Le retour des veuves		English title: Take Me Down
1980	Ta gueule, je t'aime!	Ingrid	English title: Shut Up, I Love You!
1980	Le journal érotique d'une Thailandaise	Claudine	Credited as Brigette Lahaye; English titles: Emanuele 3; Emmanuele 3
1980	La Nuit des traquées	Elysabeth	English title: The Night of the Hunted
1980	Maîtresse pour couple	Brigitte	
1980	Sechs Schwedinnen von der Tankstelle	Greta	English title: High Test Girls
1980	Le coup du parapluie	Girl in the pool	Uncredited
1980	Les enfilées	The woman on the rotating bed	
1980	Les petites écolières	The school director	
1980	Le segrete esperienze di Luca e Fanny	Simona, the maid	Credited as Brigitte van Meerhaegue
1981	Enquêtes		
1981	Diva	The girl who escapes	Credited as Brigitte Simonin
1981	Parties très spéciales		
1981	Deux gamines		Uncredited role
1981	Body-body à Bangkok		
1981	For a Cop's Hide	The nurse	Credited as Brigitte Simonin
1981	Si ma gueule vous plaît...	The stripper	Credited as Brigitte Simonin
1981	Les paumées du petit matin	Femme couple bourgeois	English titles: The Escapees; The Runaways
1981	Paul Raymond's Erotica	Brigitte	
1982	Te marre pas... c'est pour rire!	Sandra	Credited as Brigitte Simonin
1982	Nestor Burma, détective de choc	Young girl at the party	Uncredited; English title: Nestor Burma, Shock Detective
1982	N'oublie pas ton père au vestiaire	Mother of the brat	Credited as Brigitte Simonin
1982	Julchen und Jettchen, die verliebten Apothekerstöchter	Jenny	
1982	Hot Action		
1982	Electric Blue 5	Fanny	Video
1983	Baisers exotiques	Elisabeth	
1983	Éducation anglaise	Henriette	
1984	La France interdite		
1985	Brigade des mœurs		Credited as Brigitte Simonin
1985	Joy et Joan	Joy	Alternative title: "Joan and Joy"
1986	L'exécutrice	Martine	English title: The Female Executioner
1986	Suivez mon regard	Woman forsaken	English title: Follow My Gaze
1986	Le couteau sous la gorge	Valérie Landis	
1987	On se calme et on boit frais à Saint-Tropez	Alexandra	
1987	Le diable rose	Naska / Lolita	
1988	Faceless	Nathalie	With Helmut Berger and Telly Savalas
1988	Dark Mission: Flowers of Evil	Mauria	
1990	Henry & June	Henry Miller's whore	With Fred Ward, Uma Thurman, Maria de Medeiros, Richard E. Grant and Kevin Spacey
1995	Electric Blue: Sex Model File #4	Fanny	
1997	Les deux orphelines vampires		English title: The Two Orphan Vampires
1998	Cornets in Time		
2002	La fiancée de Dracula	She-wolf	English titles: Fiancée of Dracula; Dracula's Fiancée
2004	Calvaire	Miss Vicky	English title: The Ordeal; With Laurent Lucas
2009	Quelque chose à te dire		Voice
2013	Le bonheur	Dr Alice	
2020	Une dernière fois	Salomé	

=== Television ===
Year	Title	Role	Notes
1981	Antoine et Julie		Television film Credited as Brigitte Simonin
1982	Les brigades vertes		Television film
1983	Au théâtre ce soir	The phone operator	Episode: "Je leur laisserai un mot"
1983	Le lavabo		Television mini-series
1987	Cinéma 16	The prostitute	Episode: "Johnny Monroe"
1989	Le triplé gagnant		Episode: "Le dernier rendez-vous du président"

=== Short films ===
Year	Title	Role
1987	Thérèse II La mission	Thérèse
1993	Illusions fatales	
1999	Les fourches caudines	
2000	La dame pipi	

== Bibliography ==
- Lahaie, Brigitte (1987). Moi, la scandaleuse [Me, the scandalous one] (in French). Filipacchi/J'ai Lu. ISBN 2-277-22362-X.
- Lahaie, Brigitte (1989). Le zodiaque érotique [The erotic zodiac] (in French). Ergo Press. ISBN 978-2739500266.
- Lahaie, Brigitte (1990). La femme modèle [The model woman] (in French). J'ai Lu. ISBN 2-277-23102-9.
- Lahaie, Brigitte (1994). Les sens de la vie [The senses of life] (in French). Michel Lafon/J'ai Lu. ISBN 2-277-23916-X.
- Lahaie, Brigitte (1996). La sexe défendu [Sex defended] (in French). Michel Lafon. ISBN 2-84098-169-6.
- Cédric Grandguillot and Guillaume Le Disez (2016). Brigitte Lahie: les films de culte, Editions Glenat, S.A. ISBN 2344018999
- Lahaie, Brigitte (2018). Le Bûcher des sexes: La révolution n'aura pas lieu [The Pyre: The revolution will not happen] (in French). Albin Michel. ISBN 978-2226396099.

== See also ==
- Golden Age of Porn
- List of porn stars who appeared in mainstream films
