= Love at Twenty =

1962 film

- Film poster
- Directed by: François Truffaut; Andrzej Wajda; Renzo Rossellini; Shintarō Ishihara; Marcel Ophüls
- Written by: Shintarô Ishihara; Marcel Ophüls; Renzo Rossellini; Yvon Samuel; Jerzy Stefan Stawiński; François Truffaut
- Produced by: Pierre Roustang
- Starring: Jean-Pierre Léaud; Marie-France Pisier
- Cinematography: Raoul Coutard; Mario Montuori; Wolfgang Wirth; Jerzy Lipman; Shigeo Hayashida
- Edited by: Claudine Bouché
- Music by: Georges Delerue
- Distributed by: 20th Century-Fox (France, United Kingdom and Ireland); Medio Film (Italy); Centrala Wynajmu Filmów (Eastern Europe)
- Release date: 22 June 1962
- Running time: 120 minutes
- Countries: France; Italy; Japan; Poland; West Germany
- Languages: French; Polish; Japanese; Italian; German
- Box office: 264,508 admissions (France)

Love at Twenty (French: L'Amour à vingt ans, Japanese: 二十歳の恋, romanized: Hatachi no koi, Italian: L'amore a vent'anni, German: Liebe mit zwanzig, Polish: Miłość dwudziestolatków) is a 1962 French-produced omnibus project of Pierre Roustang, consisting of five segments, each with a different director from a different country. It was entered into the 12th Berlin International Film Festival.

The first segment, titled "Antoine and Colette", is by François Truffaut and returns actor Jean-Pierre Léaud to the role of Antoine Doinel, a role he played three years earlier in The 400 Blows and would return to again in 1968 (Stolen Kisses), 1970 (Bed and Board) and 1979 (Love on the Run). It concerns the frustrations of love for the now 17-year-old Doinel and the unresponsive girl he adores.

The second, titled "Rome", is the directorial debut of 21-year-old Renzo Rossellini, son of Roberto Rossellini and later a noted producer. It tells the story of a tough mistress who loses her lover to an older, wealthier and more appreciative woman.

The third, "Tokyo" by Japanese film director Shintarō Ishihara, has been described as a "weird, grotesque" and "clumsy" tale of obsessive and morbid love.

The fourth, "Munich", is by Marcel Ophüls and was described as a "charming, but somewhat sentimental" story of an unwed mother who contrives to trap her baby's father.

The fifth and final segment, "Warsaw" by Andrzej Wajda, depicts a brief intergenerational liaison based upon multiple misunderstandings.

The episodes are tied together with still photos by Henri Cartier-Bresson and a verse of the film’s theme by Georges Delerue sung by Xavier Depraz in the language of the preceding vignette.

Truffaut's and Wajda's segments (the first and the last, respectively) are considered the highlights.

== Cast ==
- Jean-Pierre Léaud as Antoine Doinel (segment Antoine and Colette)
- Marie-France Pisier as Colette (segment Antoine and Colette)
- Patrick Auffay as René (segment Antoine and Colette)
- Rosy Varte as La mère de Colette (segment Antoine and Colette)
- François Darbon as Le beau-père de Colette (segment Antoine and Colette)
- Jean-François Adam as Albert Tazzi (segment Antoine and Colette)
- Pierre Schaeffer as himself (segment Antoine and Colette)
- Cristina Gajoni as Christina
- Geronimo Meynier as Leonardo
- Eleonora Rossi Drago as Valentina
- Nami Tamura as Fukimo
- Koji Furuhata as Hiroshi
- Barbara Frey as Ursula
- Christian Doermer as Tonio
- Vera Tschechowa as Self
- Werner Finck as Professor Zeifer
- Barbara Lass as Basia (segment "Warszawa")
- Zbigniew Cybulski as Zbyszek (segment "Warszawa")
- Władysław Kowalski as Wladek (segment "Warszawa")
