= Dani (singer) =

French actress and singer (1944–2022)

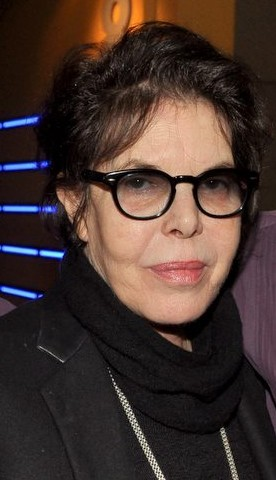
- Dani in 2012

Background information
- Born: Danièle Graule; 1 October 1944; Castres, France
- Died: 18 July 2022 (aged 77) Tours, France
- Genre: French variety
- Years active: 1966–2022
- Label: Universal Music

Danièle Graule (1 October 1944 – 18 July 2022), known as Dani (sometimes as Dany), was a French actress and singer.

== Biography ==
Dani was born in Castres. In 1966 she was contracted to Pathé-Marconi and released her first single "Garçon manqué". In 1968 "Papa vient d'épouser la bonne" sold a million copies and was a major hit. Dani was meant to have been France's Eurovision Song Contest 1974 entry with the song "La Vie à 25 ans", written by Christine Fontane, but President Georges Pompidou died in the week of the competition, so she never entered Eurovision properly. Her only English language record release to date was "That Old Familiar Feeling", which had the same music as "La Vie à 25 ans" but with English lyrics by British singer-songwriter Lynsey de Paul.

On the cinema screen, she played the script-girl Liliane in François Truffaut's Day for Night and in the last Antoine Doinel-adventure Love on the Run a short-time-affair of Antoine, Christine's friend Liliane. Truffaut who made her famous with one role in two movies: she is Liliane in Day for Night. The fickle girlfriend of actor Alphonse (Jean-Pierre Léaud) recruited as a script trainee who is pinching for the English stuntman. In 1978, this Liliane became the friend of Christine Doinel alias Claude Jade in the final film of the Doinel cyclus. Truffaut used Liliane's flashbacks for Love on the Run. Here Liliane becomes the best friend of Christine (Claude Jade). And later, she has an affair with her husband Antoine, again Jean-Pierre Léaud. Thanks to the installation of new and old scenes, Claude Jade also mounted in the flashbacks of Day for Night, it seems Dani was already part of the Doinel Cycle.

She died in Tours on 18 July 2022, aged 77.

== Discography ==
=== Albums ===
- 1967 : "H" comme Hippies
- 1970 : Dani
- 1977 : Les Migrateurs
- 1993 : N Comme Never Again
- 2003 : Tout dépend du contexte
- 2005 : Laissez-Moi Rire
- 2020 : Horizons doré
- 2024 : Attention départ

== Selected filmography ==
- 1970: Tumuc Humac by Jean-Marie Périer, with Marc Porel and François Périer
- 1973: Quelques messieurs trop tranquilles by Georges Lautner, with Bruno Pradal
- 1973: A Police Officer Without Importance by Jean Larriaga, with Marc Porel
- 1973: Day for Night by François Truffaut, with Jean-Pierre Léaud, Jacqueline Bisset
- 1976: Les Anneaux de Bicêtre by Louis Grospierre, with Michel Bouquet, Claude Jade
- 1979: Love on the Run by François Truffaut, with Jean-Pierre Léaud, Claude Jade
- 1988: Story of Women by Claude Chabrol, with Isabelle Huppert, François Cluzet
- 2006: Avenue Montaigne by Danièle Thompson, with Cécile de France, Valérie Lemercier
- 2018: Guy by Alex Lutz, with Alex Lutz, Pascale Arbillot, Élodie Bouchez
