= Zénaïde Rossi =

Zénaïde Rossi (1 May 1923, Nice, France – 28 October 2005, Grasse, France) was a singer, actress, and entertainer, also known under the stage name Irene Reni.

== Life and work ==
Born to Luigi Rossi (Bari, Italy) and Armida Niccolaï (Florence, Italy).

The middle sister of three, she was married to French military officer Alphonse Emil Alfred Latrique for a few years. She had three sons with him: Alain, Marc Y.C.father of Marc Daniel Latrique and Jean-Luc Latrique's father of Jean-Gabriel Latrique. Later, divorced, she met and fell deeply in-love with Gabriel Roche, a successful urban developer during the rebuilding years of France after World War II. They remained together into their elderly ages for more than 40 years only to marry in 2000.

She lived the majority of her years in Nice Geaurot, France. The last few in Cagne-sur-mer, France. She died in a hospital in Grasse, France.

Early in her career she was mostly a singer and eventually became an actress. She most notably played the role of Madame Lajoie in François Truffaut's Academy Award for Best Foreign Language Film winner, Day for Night (1973) (originally billed as La Nuit américaine, France) for which Truffaut was also nominated for the Academy Award for Best Director. The film won the 1973 BAFTA Award for Best Film. She played the role of Madame Pouche in Philippe Ducrest's television programme Chambre 17 (1981), as well as an "old woman" in the mini-television-series A Year in Provence (1993). Grosses bises a toute la famille.

== Filmography ==
- 1973: La Nuit américaine (official release) / Day for Night (USA release) (Motion Picture/Film) (directed by François Truffaut) (starring Jacqueline Bisset, Jean-Pierre Léaud) - Madame Lajoie
- 1979: Ils sont grands, ces petits (Motion Picture/Film) (directed by Joël Santoni) (starring Catherine Deneuve) - Concierge
- 1981: Chambre 17 (Television) (directed by Philippe Ducrest) - Madame Pouche
- 1993: A Year in Provence (Television) - old woman (final appearance)

== Death ==
On 28 October 2005, Zénaïde Rossi Roche passed, survived at that time by her two youngest sons. Her remains were donated to science as per her wishes.
