= Serge Rousseau =

French actor (1930–2007)

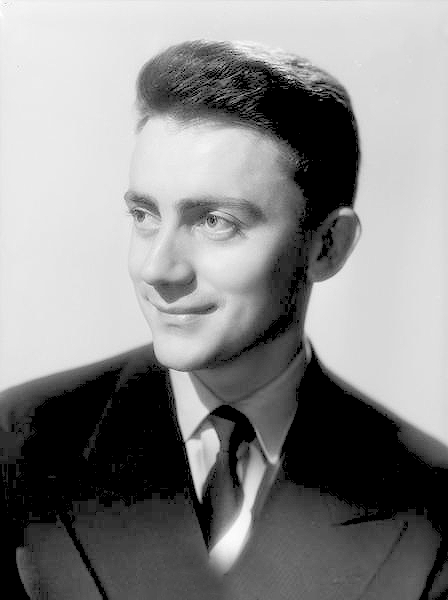
- Image of Serge Rousseau
- Born: 13 March 1930; Aube, Orne, France
- Died: 3 November 2007 (aged 77)
- Occupation: Actor
- Spouse: Marie Dubois

Serge Rousseau (13 March 1930 – 3 November 2007) was a French film and television actor and agent. He was a close friend of François Truffaut. He played the murdered husband of Jeanne Moreau in The Bride Wore Black and the unknown man who declares his love for Claude Jade at the end of Stolen Kisses. He married Marie Dubois in 1961, and they remained together until his death by cancer at the age of 77. They had a daughter, actress Dominique Rousseau.

== Selected filmography ==
- Maigret and the Saint-Fiacre Case (1959) - Émile Gaulthier
- Le bonheur est pour demain (1961) - Le jeune caréneur
- Les Mauvais Coups (1961) - Duval
- Portrait-robot (1962)
- La foire aux cancres (Chronique d'une année scolaire) (1963) - L'aspirant
- Mata Hari, Agent H21 (1964) - (uncredited)
- Thomas l'imposteur (1965)
- The Sleeping Car Murders (1965) - Le contrôleur du train
- Is Paris Burning? (1966) - Col. Fabien (uncredited)
- The Bride Wore Black (1968) - David
- Stolen Kisses (1968) - Le type qui suit Christine
- Bed and Board (1970) - Petit rôle (uncredited)
- Nous n'irons plus au bois (1970) - Albert
- Les zozos (1973) - Le Professeur
- The Green Room (1978) - Paul Masigny
- Patrick Dewaere (1992) - Himself
- La Cérémonie (1995) - (final film role)
