= Antoine and Colette =

1962 short film by François Truffaut

- 2021 French re-release poster
- French: Antoine et Colette
- Directed by: François Truffaut
- Written by: François Truffaut
- Produced by: Pierre Roustang
- Starring: Jean-Pierre Léaud; Marie-France Pisier; Patrick Auffay
- Cinematography: Raoul Coutard
- Edited by: Claudine Bouché
- Music by: Georges Delerue
- Production companies: Ulysse Productions; Unitel
- Distributed by: 20th Century Fox; Embassy Pictures
- Release date: 22 June 1962
- Running time: 32 minutes
- Country: France
- Language: French

Antoine and Colette (French: Antoine et Colette) is a 1962 French short film written and directed by François Truffaut. It is the second installment in Truffaut's five-film series about Antoine Doinel, the character he follows from boyhood to adulthood. Antoine and Colette was made for the 1962 anthology collection Love at Twenty, which also featured shorts from directors Shintarô Ishihara, Marcel Ophüls, Renzo Rossellini and Andrzej Wajda.

Antoine Doinel—and Jean-Pierre Léaud, the actor who played him in all five films—had made his screen debut in 1959 with Truffaut's first film, The 400 Blows. Truffaut's semi-autobiographical film about the young Antoine and his gradual descent into petty crime had introduced the world to the French New Wave, a highly influential outpouring of work from young filmmakers such as Jean-Luc Godard, Agnès Varda, Claude Chabrol and Éric Rohmer.

== Plot ==
Antoine and Colette catches up with Antoine as a solitary 17-year-old who works at Philips manufacturing LPs to support himself. He lives in a furnished room by himself in Place Clichy, listening to opera and classical music and spending time with René (Patrick Auffay), his school friend from The 400 Blows.

One day, while attending a Berlioz Music Programme with René, he spots Colette (Marie-France Pisier), a secondary school student, and falls in love for the first time.

Colette is his own age, but unlike Antoine has a warm, supportive family with whom she still lives. Antoine forms a strong friendship with Colette and, eventually, also her parents who begin to treat him as if he were a part of their family.

Colette's feelings for Antoine are at first ambiguous and, harbouring some hope that she might grow to return them, he leaves his apartment at the Place Clichy and moves into an apartment across the road from her family's. Although she continues to treat him kindly, it slowly becomes apparent that she is not interested in him romantically. He sulks about this and at first refuses to see her, but he is lured back by a dinner invitation. It is clear that her family still consider him a surrogate son and are possibly hoping for something romantic to happen between the two teenagers.

All of these hopes are dashed, however, when the pretty Colette is met at the front door by an older man. Her parents and Antoine look helplessly on as she disappears off with her date. They are all left to watch television.

Doinel's adventures follow with Stolen Kisses, Bed and Board and Love on the Run.

== Cast ==
- Jean-Pierre Léaud as Antoine Doinel
- Marie-France Pisier as Colette
- Patrick Auffay as René
- Rosy Varte as Colette's mother
- François Darbon as Colette's stepfather
- Jean-François Adam as Albert Tazzi
- Pierre Schaeffer as himself, music and media producer

== Development ==
Truffaut had finished Jules and Jim in 1962 when he was approached by film producer Pierre Roustang for his omnibus film project Love at Twenty. Truffaut was influential in helping to select Shintarô Ishihara, Marcel Ophüls, Renzo Rossellini and Andrzej Wajda as the other directors who eventually participated in the project. In his book Truffaut on Truffaut, Truffaut later said "For my part, the French episode gave me the occasion to realize a project I hadn't dared to launch on my own, a short sequel to my first film, The 400 Blows, in which we would meet up with the young Antoine Doinel three years later having his first sentimental adventure, one that would illustrate the moral: you risk losing everything by wanting too much."

Antoine and Colette is a largely autobiographical work, based on 17-year-old Truffaut's infatuation with an unconventional beauty named Liliane Litvin. Truffaut met Litvin at the Cinémathèque Française and quit his job as a welder and moved to Paris to be near her. Like Antoine, he took an apartment across the street from hers so that he could monitor her activities. However, she ultimately was not interested in him nor in any of his friends (she had attracted attention from Jean Gruault and Jean-Luc Godard).
