= Helen Grace Scott =

American screenwriter (1915–1987)

- Born: Helen Grace Reswick; June 16, 1915; Brooklyn, New York, United States
- Died: November 20, 1987 (aged 72)
- Known for: Spying, radio and film work

Helen Grace Reswick Scott Keenan (June 16, 1915 – November 20, 1987), more commonly, Helen Grace Scott, was a United States citizen employed in the Office of Strategic Services and later the Office of U.S Chief Counsel for Prosecution of Axis War Criminals on the staff of Justice Robert H. Jackson during World War II. She was also a broadcaster for Free France in Brazzaville, and later in life, as Helen G. Scott, was a close associate of François Truffaut and other French filmmakers.

== Early life ==
Helen Grace Reswick was born in Brooklyn, New York, the daughter of William Reswick and Bessie Schwartz Reswick. She and her brothers were raised in Paris, where their father worked as a journalist with the Associated Press. William Reswick, who was born in Ukraine, was also a correspondent in Moscow from 1922 to 1934, and wrote a memoir of his time there. She was fluent in English and French from childhood.

In 1943, during World War II, Reswick fled France due to her Jewish heritage and settled in Brazzaville, Congo, where she was a radio broadcaster for Free France. After the war, she was a press attaché to Justice Robert H. Jackson at the Nuremberg trials. She was recognized later for her wartime work: in 1965, she was awarded the Commemorative medal for voluntary service in Free France, and in 1986 she was named a Chevalier of the Ordre des Arts et des Lettres.

== Alleged spy activities ==
Between 1933 and 1938, Helen Scott served on the Executive Committee of the Workers Alliance, a Comintern affiliate front organization. In 1944, she worked for Congressman Boulton. Keenan had been a freelance journalist in the 1930s before beginning work in the Office of the Coordinator of Inter-American Affairs (OCIAA) as a writer and editor in 1945. She first worked for the New York line of KGB, then later the Washington, D.C. branch of the KGB.

=== Venona ===
Helen Grace Scott Keenan's code name in Soviet intelligence, and later as deciphered by the Venona project is "Fir" (or "Spruce"). "Firtree" and "El" also occurred. Keenan is referenced in the following Venona decryptions:

- 326: KGB Moscow to New York, April 5, 1945;
- 3614–3615: KGB Washington to Moscow, June 22, 1945.

== Later career ==
Scott worked as a senior editor at the United Nations headquarters, and from 1959 to 1965 at the French Film Office in New York, as director of public relations. She worked with many French and American filmmakers in this role, including Robert Benton, Miloš Forman, Jacques Tati, Alain Resnais, and Jean-Luc Godard. She also wrote the English subtitles of various French-language films, including Manon of the Spring and Jean de Florette.

She assisted François Truffaut as the interpreter in his conversations with Alfred Hitchcock, using both her language skills and her specialized knowledge of film. She collaborated with Truffaut in writing the resulting book, Hitchcock/Truffaut (1966). She wrote additional dialogue for Truffaut's Fahrenheit 451 (1966), and was among the writers nominated for a Hugo Award when that film was a finalist for Best Dramatic Presentation in 1967. Later, she translated another book of Truffaut's, The Adventures of Antoine Doinel (1971). Scott was Truffaut's confidante, and their correspondence offers insight into his personal life and relationships.

Scott appeared in uncredited cameos in Godard's Weekend (1967) and Truffaut's Bed & Board (1970). She also appears in archival footage in the 2015 documentary Hitchcock/Truffaut.

== Personal life ==
Helen G. Scott was divorced. She died in Paris in 1987, aged 72 years, from a heart attack. Her gravesite is in Montmartre Cemetery, not far from Truffaut's.

== Sources ==
- John Earl Haynes and Harvey Klehr, Venona: Decoding Soviet Espionage in America (New Haven: Yale University Press, 1999)
- Underground Soviet Espionage Organization (NKVD) in Agencies of the United States Government, 21 February 1946, FBI Silvermaster file (65-56402), serial 573
