= Denys Clerval =

French cinematographer

Denys Clerval (11 September 1934 in Paris – 9 June 2016) was a French cinematographer.

== Selected filmography ==
Short films

- 1961: 10 juin 1944 by Maurice Cohen (Prix Jean-Vigo 1962)
- 1961: Actua-Tilt by Jean Herman
- 1961: La Quille by Jean Herman (Prix du jury at the Venice Film Festival)
- 1962: Twist Parade by Jean Herman (Award for best documentary film at the 1963 International Short Film Festival Oberhausen)
- 1963: La Meule by René Allio
- 1965: Les Autres by Maurice Cohen
- 1964: La Belle Époque by Claude Guillemot
- 1964: De Paris à la Provence by Claude Guillemot
- 1964: La Cinémathèque française by Jean Herman
- 1967: Le Temps redonné by Henri Fabiani and Jean-Louis Levi-Alvarès
- 1967: Baudelaire est mort en été by François Weyergans

Moyen métrage

- 1962: Le Chemin de la mauvaise route by Jean Herman

Feature films

- 1965: The Shameless Old Lady by René Allio
- 1967: The Wall by Serge Roullet
- 1968: La Trêve by Claude Guillemot
- 1968: Stolen Kisses by François Truffaut
- 1969: Mississippi Mermaid by François Truffaut
- 1970: Les Camisards by René Allio
- 1973: Rude Journée pour la reine by René Allio
- 1981: Malevil by Christian de Chalonge (2nd team)
- 1983: Erendira by Ruy Guerra
- 1987: Ubac by Jean-Pierre Grasset
- 1987: La Brute by Claude Guillemot
- 1989: Natalia de Bernard Cohn
- 1991: The Annunciation of Marie by Alain Cuny
- 1994: Daisy et Mona by Claude d'Anna

Télévision

- 1969: Jean-Roch Coignet, mini série by Claude-Jean Bonnardot
- 1981: La Double Vie de Théophraste Longuet, mini series by Yannick Andréi
- 1993: La Fortune de Gaspard, telefilm by Gérard Blain
