= Stolen Kisses =

1968 French New Wave romantic comedy film by François Truffaut

- Theatrical release poster
- French: Baisers volés
- Directed by: François Truffaut
- Written by: François Truffaut; Claude de Givray; Bernard Revon
- Produced by: François Truffaut; Marcel Berbert
- Starring: Jean-Pierre Léaud; Delphine Seyrig; Claude Jade; Michael Lonsdale; Harry-Max; André Falcon; Daniel Ceccaldi
- Cinematography: Denys Clerval
- Edited by: Agnès Guillemot
- Music by: Antoine Duhamel
- Production companies: Les Films du Carrosse; Les Productions Artistes Associés
- Distributed by: Les Artistes Associés
- Release dates: 14 August 1968 (Avignon Film Festival); 4 September 1968 (France)
- Running time: 91 minutes
- Country: France
- Language: French
- Budget: $350,000
- Box office: $1.5 million 1,156,101 admissions (France)

Stolen Kisses (French: Baisers Volés) is a 1968 French New Wave romantic comedy film directed by François Truffaut, starring Jean-Pierre Léaud, Delphine Seyrig, and Claude Jade. It continues the story of the character Antoine Doinel, whom Truffaut had previously depicted in The 400 Blows (1959) and the short film Antoine and Colette (1962). In this film, Antoine begins his relationship with Christine Darbon, which is depicted further in the last two films in the series, Bed & Board (1970) and Love on the Run (1979).

The original French title of the film comes from a line in Charles Trenet's song "Que reste-t-il de nos amours ?," which is also used as the film's signature tune. The film was nominated for the Academy Award for Best Foreign Language Film.

The film begins with a pan onto the locked gates of the Cinémathèque Française, then based at the Palais de Chaillot. On the gates, there is a sign 'Relache' ('Closed'). This is Truffaut's reference to the Affaire Langlois when the head of the Cinémathèque had been fired by the French government. He was eventually reinstated after filmmakers such as Truffaut used all their wiles to foment protest.

== Plot ==
Antoine Doinel, now a young man, is discharged from the army as unfit, because he prefers to read novels and write to his sweetheart, violinist Christine Darbon, than to obey his superiors. He has written to Christine voluminously (but "not always nicely", she declares) while in the military, sometimes more than once a day. However, she never wrote him back.

Christine is away skiing with friends when Antoine arrives at her house, and her parents must entertain him themselves, though they are glad to see him. After learning that Antoine needs a job, Christine's parents help him get hired as a night clerk in the Hôtel Alsina, where he spends most of his time reading. Christine goes to see him there, and, after not seeing each other for such a long time, they seem to hit it off. One morning, a man accompanied by a private detective makes Antoine lead them to a room where a woman has recently checked in. The woman turns out to be the man's wife and is sharing the bed with someone else when Antoine and company enter her room. Furious, the woman's husband starts trashing the room. Antoine gets blamed for the resulting commotion and loses his job. However, he later strikes up a friendship with the detective and gets hired by his agency.

Antoine's detective friend teaches him the tricks of his trade. One day while following someone, Antoine runs into Colette (the object of his infatuation in Antoine and Colette) who has married a man named Albert Tazzi and had a child.

The job, however, separates Antoine from Christine, as trying to pay attention to her and shadow people at the same time starts to be too much for him. One evening, Georges Tabard, the owner of a shoe store, visits the agency wanting to find out why no one seems to like him. Despite never having worked in a store and being quite clumsy, Antoine poses as a stock boy to solve that mystery. Soon, he falls for Georges's wife, Fabienne, who willingly seduces him. Smitten with her and seeing his current romantic situation as hopeless, Antoine breaks up with Christine, saying he has never "admired" her. The agency starts to suspect that Fabienne is cheating on their client, and Antoine is forced to come clean. The same day he is fired from the agency, his detective mentor passes away.

Antoine eventually becomes a TV repairman and avoids Christine at all costs. One day, his poor driving skills crash his work van into Christine's dad's car. However, no one is harmed. Christine's dad forgives him and later talks to his daughter about Antoine's new job. To win him back, Christine deliberately disables her TV and calls Antoine's company for repairs, while her parents are away. The company sends Antoine, whose lack of skills makes him try for hours to fix a TV that is only missing a tube. Taking advantage of this opportunity, Christine reconciles with Antoine, and the two have sex. The next morning, without saying a word, Antoine proposes to her, and she accepts.

The newly engaged Antoine and Christine later stroll in a park. A man who has trailed Christine for days approaches the couple and declares his love for Christine. He describes his love as "permanent" and unlike the "temporary" love of "temporary people." When he walks away, Christine presumes that the man is insane. Antoine, recognising similarities in much of his own behaviour, admits, "He must be."

== Cast ==
- Jean-Pierre Léaud as Antoine Doinel
- Delphine Seyrig as Fabienne Tabard
- Claude Jade as Christine Darbon
- Michael Lonsdale as Georges Tabard
- Harry-Max as Monsieur Henri
- André Falcon as Monsieur Blady, manager of the private detective agency
- Daniel Ceccaldi as Christine's father
- Claire Duhamel as Christine's mother
- Catherine Lutz as Catherine
- Martine Ferrière as Gérante
- Jacques Rispal as Monsieur Colin
- Serge Rousseau as unknown man
- Paul Pavel as Julien
- François Darbon as Chief Warrant Officer Picard
- Simono as Albani
- Jacques Delord as Robert Espannet, magician
- Roger Trapp as hotel manager (uncredited)
- Martine Brochard as M^{me} Colin (uncredited)
- Robert Cambouakis as M^{me} Colin's lover (uncredited)
- Marie-France Pisier as Colette Tazzi (uncredited)
- Jean-François Adam as Albert Tazzi (uncredited)
- Christine Pellé as Mademoiselle Ida (uncredited)
- Jacques Robiolles as writer (uncredited)
- Marcel Mercier as man at the garage (uncredited)
- Joseph Merieau as man at the garage (uncredited)

== References to other Truffaut films ==
- Early in the film, Doinel can be seen reading a French translation of the 1947 William Irish (Cornell Woolrich) novel Waltz into Darkness, the source of Truffaut's next film, Mississippi Mermaid.
- In the first scene, Doinel reads Le Lys dans la vallée (The Lily in the Valley).
- The character Colette Tazzi and her husband Albert make a brief cameo appearance. She chides Doinel for not contacting her, saying he did not use to be "afraid of the telephone". This is a reference to the plot of the 1962 Antoine and Colette.

== Release ==
=== Critical response ===
Stolen Kisses was well-reviewed by critics all over the world. The film has an approval rating of 97% on review aggregator website Rotten Tomatoes, based on 29 reviews, and an average rating of 7.8/10. The website's critical consensus states: "Stolen Kisses is a fine feature follow-up to The 400 Blows, transforming Antoine Doinel into a sympathetic, silly, and romantic figure that carries to the series' end".

In an enthusiastic review for The New York Times (4 March 1969), Vincent Canby commented:

With what can only be described as cinematic grace, Truffaut's point of view slips in and out of Antoine so that something that on the surface looks like a conventional movie eventually becomes as fully and carefully populated as a Balzac novel. There is not a silly or superfluous incident, character, or camera angle in the movie. Truffaut is the star of the film, always in control, whether the movie is ranging into the area of slapstick, lyrical romance or touching lightly on De Gaulle's France (a student demonstration on the TV screen). His love of old movies is reflected in plot devices (overheard conversations), incidental action (two children walking out of the shoe store wearing Laurel and Hardy masks), and in the score, which takes Charles Trenet's 1943 song Que reste-t-il de nos amours (known in an English-language version as "I Wish You Love") and turns it into a joyous motif.

Danny Peary called it "François Truffaut's witty, sad, insightful meditation on Love, encompassing passion, courtship, confusion, conflict, romance, jealousy, disloyalty, dishonesty, sex, conquest, and commitment (and second thoughts)."

=== Awards and nominations ===
Year	Award ceremony	Category	Nominee	Result
1970	NBR Awards	Top Foreign Language Films	Stolen Kisses	Won
1970	National Society of Film Critics Awards	Best Film	Stolen Kisses	Nominated
1970	National Society of Film Critics Awards	Best Director	François Truffaut	Won
1970	National Society of Film Critics Awards	Best Supporting Actress	Delphine Seyrig	Won
1969	Academy Awards	Best Foreign Language Film	Stolen Kisses	Nominated
1969	Golden Globe Awards	Best Foreign Language Film	Stolen Kisses	Nominated
1969	French Syndicate of Cinema Critics	Prix Méliès	Stolen Kisses	Won
1969	New York Film Critics Circle Awards	Best Supporting Actress	Delphine Seyrig	Nominated
1969	New York Film Critics Circle Awards	Best Screenplay	Bernard Revon, Claude de Givray, François Truffaut	Nominated
1968	Cahiers du cinéma	Annual Top 10 List	François Truffaut	8th
1968	Prix Louis Delluc	Best Film	Stolen Kisses	Won

== See also ==
- List of submissions to the 41st Academy Awards for Best Foreign Language Film
- List of French submissions for the Academy Award for Best Foreign Language Film
