= Claude Véga =

French impersonator, humorist, and actor (1930–2022)

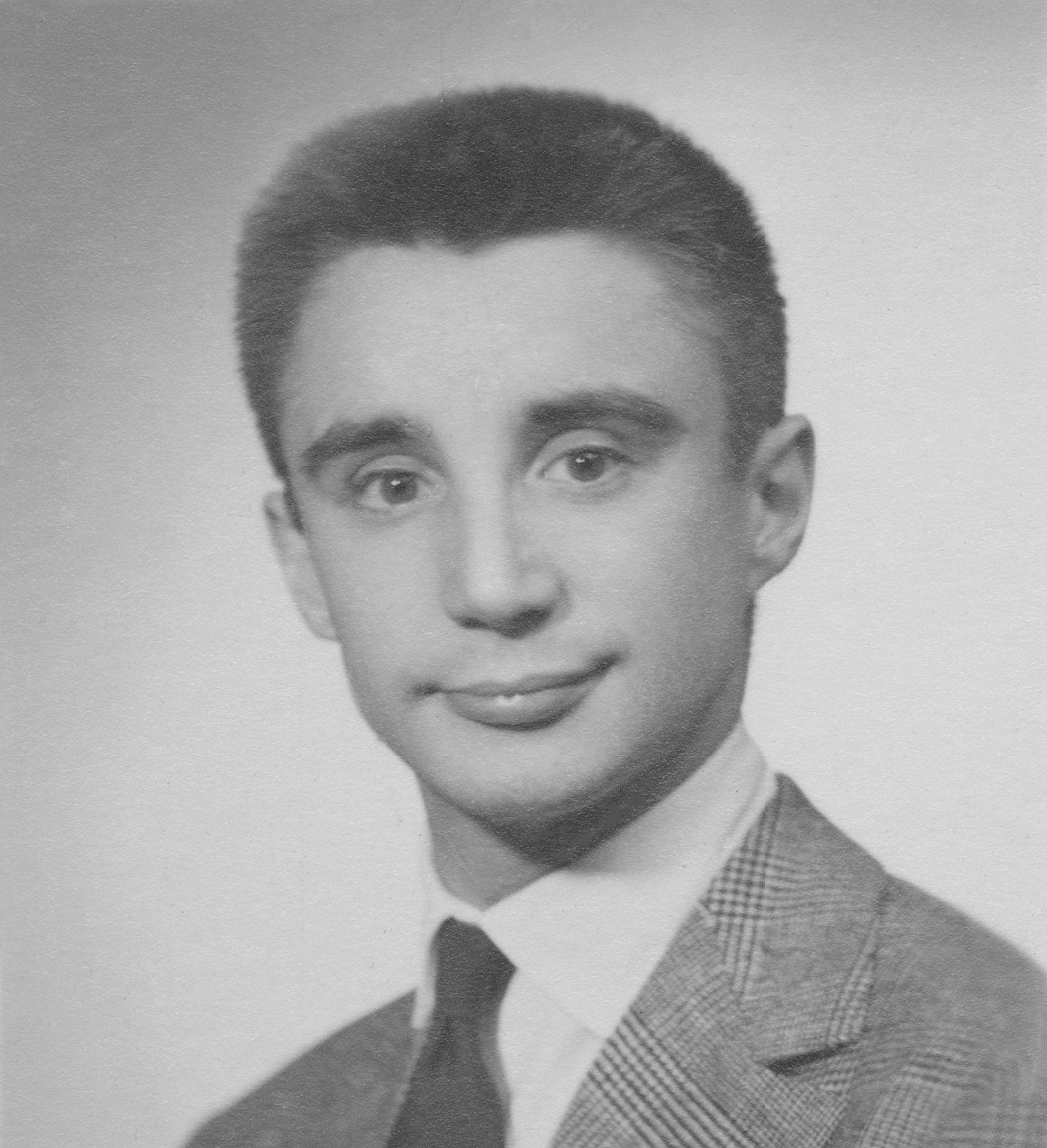
- Claude Véga in 1958
- Born: Claude Thibaudat; 2 June 1930; Paris, France
- Died: 11 April 2022 (aged 91); Paris, France
- Occupations: Comedian, impressionist, actor
- Years active: 1958–2022

Claude Véga (2 June 1930 – 11 April 2022) was a French impressionist, humourist, and actor. He was widely known as a pioneer of modern stage parody in France. Véga became known as one of the first male performers in France to build a career impersonating female celebrities on stage, portraying figures such as Maria Callas, Barbara, Edwige Feuillère and Jacqueline Maillan. Although best known for his female impersonations, his repertoire also included male public figures such as Charles Aznavour, Louis de Funès, Yves Montand and Jacques Dutronc.

== Early life ==
Born Claude Thibaudat in Paris, he grew up in the 9th arrondissement and remained closely attached to the neighbourhood throughout his life. During the German occupation of France, he was a childhood friend of future filmmaker François Truffaut, a relationship later documented in accounts of Truffaut’s early years. Truffaut would later cast him in a small role in Bed and Board (1970).

== Career ==
Originally intending to pursue a career in acting, Véga left commercial studies to take drama lessons. To support himself, he performed in Parisian cabarets, notably at Liberty’s (also known as Chez Tonton), where he appeared alongside performers such as Gilbert Bécaud and others from the postwar music-hall scene. His early acts included recitations of La Fontaine’s fables delivered in multiple voices, which gradually evolved into full impersonations.

By the late 1950s, Véga had gained attention within the Paris cabaret circuit and performed opening acts for major artists, including Édith Piaf, Joséphine Baker, and Charles Trenet. His impersonations attracted prominent admirers. After seeing him perform, Maria Callas invited him to appear alongside her in televised programs.

During the 1970s and 1980s, he became a regular guest on French television variety shows hosted by Maritie and Gilbert Carpentier, Danièle Gilbert and Patrick Sébastien. A 1974 special titled Top à Claude Véga reportedly drew a large national television audience. His stage persona was characterised less by caricature than by detailed observation of gesture, speech patterns and vocal nuance.

Alongside his work as an impersonator, Véga appeared in several films, including Paris Music-Hall (1957), La marraine de Charley (1959), All the Gold in the World (1961) and François Truffaut’s Bed and Board.

=== Later career ===
Around 1990, at approximately 60 years of age, Véga reduced his impersonation performances to focus more fully on theatre and drawing. He appeared in stage productions such as Drôle de goûter, based on texts by Boris Vian, at the Comédie de Paris, and later in the musical Piaf, je t’aime, which received nominations at the Molière Awards. He also performed in the play Sylvia, directed by Lars Schmidt.

In addition to his performing career, Véga produced illustrated publications featuring his own drawings, which were described as having a light, naïve style. In 2010, he was made an Officer of the Ordre des Arts et des Lettres.

== Death ==
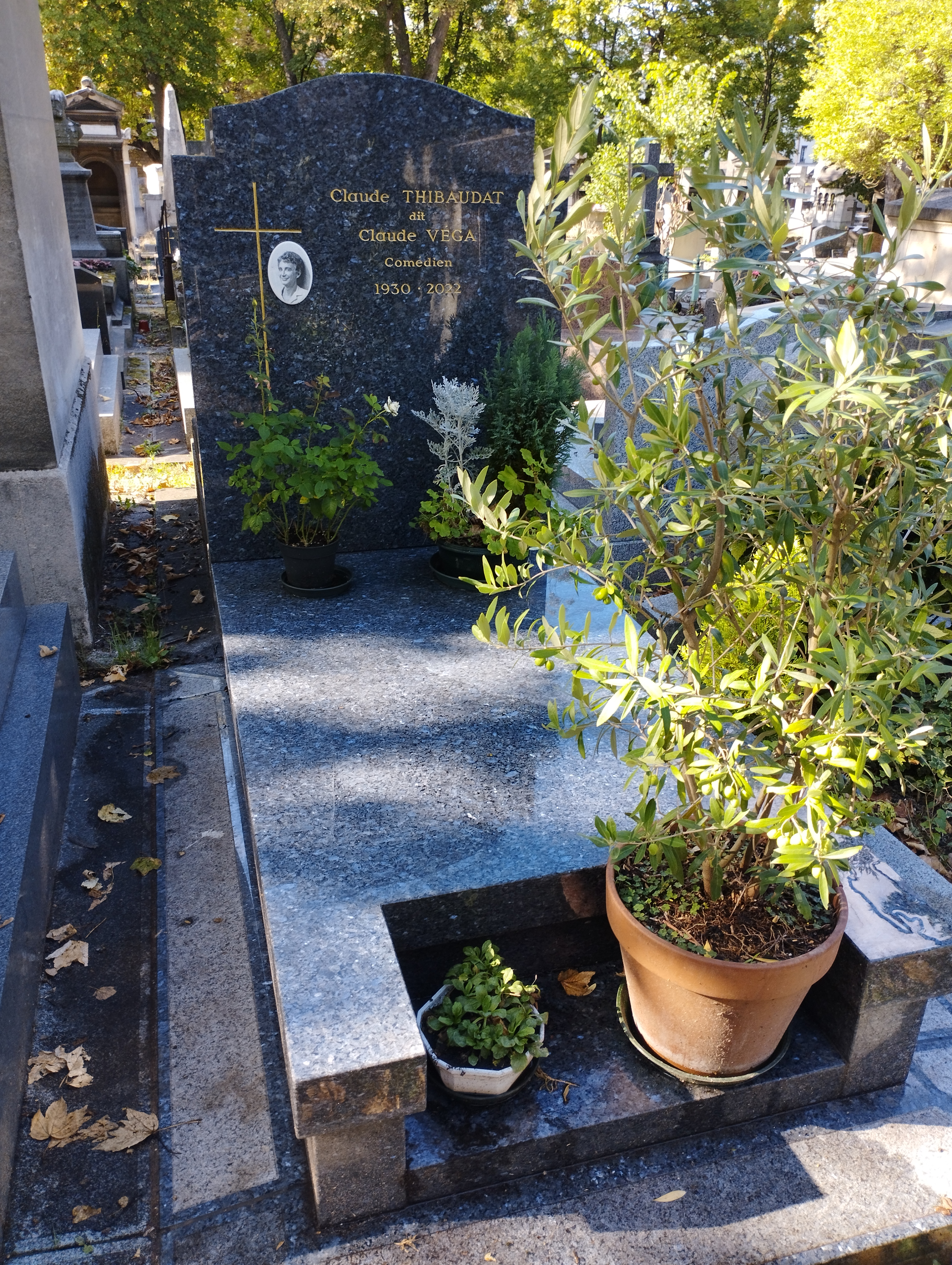
Grave of Claude Véga at Montmartre Cemetery (division 24).

Claude Véga died on 11 April 2022 at the age of 91. His death was confirmed by his partner and reported by Agence France-Presse. French media described him as a foundational figure in the development of stage impersonation in France.
