= Bed and Board =

Bed and board may refer to:

- Bed and Board (film), a 1970 French film
- Divorce from bed and board, a marital arrangement where spouses live apart but do not legally dissolve the marriage
