= Jacques Cottin =

French costume designer

Jacques Cottin was a French costume designer whose films included Jour de fête (1949), Mon oncle (1958), and Playtime (1967), for Jacques Tati. In 1970 he had a cameo in François Truffaut's Bed and Board, playing the character of Monsieur Hulot, made famous by Tati.
