= Antoine Doinel =

- Jean-Pierre Léaud as Antoine Doinel in the final scene of The 400 Blows
- First appearance: The 400 Blows; 1959
- Last appearance: Love on the Run; 1979
- Created by: François Truffaut
- Portrayed by: Jean-Pierre Léaud

Antoine Doinel (French: [ɑ̃twan dwanɛl]) is a fictional character created by François Truffaut (1932–1984) and portrayed by actor Jean-Pierre Léaud (b. 1944) in five films directed by Truffaut. Doinel is to a great extent an alter ego for Truffaut; they share many of the same childhood experiences, look somewhat alike and are even mistaken for one another on the street. Although Truffaut did not initially plan for Doinel to be a recurring character, he eventually returned to the character in one short and three features after introducing him in his debut film The 400 Blows (1959). In all, Truffaut followed the fictional life of Antoine Doinel for over 20 years, depicting his romance with Christine Darbon (Claude Jade, b. 1948) in Stolen Kisses (1968), then Antoine and Christine's marriage in Bed and Board (1970) and their subsequent divorce in Love on the Run (1979).

== Recurring characters ==
Doinel was played in all five movies by Jean-Pierre Léaud. Doinel's lover and later wife, Christine Darbon, was portrayed by Claude Jade in three films: Stolen Kisses, Bed and Board and Love on the Run. The director's love for Claude Jade shines through his alter-ego Doinel.

His unrequited love interest Colette Tazzi (Marie-France Pisier) appears in the short film, in a brief uncredited cameo in Stolen Kisses and in the last film. Patrick Auffay appears as Antoine's friend René in the first two films. François Darbon appears as Colette's father in the second and as a military adjudant in the third film. Daniel Ceccaldi and Claire Duhamel as Christine's parents in Stolen Kisses and Bed and Board. M. Lucien, one of Antoine's mother's lovers, was played by Jean Douchet in the first film in the series and by Julien Bertheau in the last. A writer friend of Antoine, played by Jacques Robiolles, appears in Stolen Kisses and Bed and Board. Antoine and Christine's son, Alphonse, is played in Bed and Board by four girls and by Julien Dubois in Love on the Run. In the 2005 radio play Alphonse's Journal (Le journal d'Alphonse) in which only Christine (Claude Jade) and Alphonse reappear, Alphonse is voiced by Stanislas Merhar.

Numerous other characters re-appear through flashbacks utilizing footage from earlier films in Love on the Run.

== The Adventures of Antoine Doinel ==
The series of five films has been named "The Adventures of Antoine Doinel". The series consists of the following:

=== The 400 Blows ===
Truffaut's debut was the film The 400 Blows. The 1959 film introduces us to the 14-year-old Doinel, a troubled Parisian boy who skips school, eventually turning to street life and petty crime in response to neglect at home by his parents. Towards the end of the film, he is sent to a reform school, from which he escapes to places unknown.

=== Antoine and Colette ===
Doinel's next appearance was in the film short Antoine and Colette, which was part of the 1962 anthology film L'amour à vingt ans. Doinel is now 17 years old and becomes obsessed with Colette, a music student who only wants to be friends.

=== Stolen Kisses ===
In the third instalment, Stolen Kisses (1968), a more mature Doinel attempts to return to civilian life after a dishonourable discharge from the military. He embarks on unstable romantic forays with Christine (Claude Jade), and then his boss's wife (Delphine Seyrig as Fabienne Tabard).

=== Bed and Board ===
In 1970, Doinel and Christine have married in Bed and Board, but Doinel suddenly becomes obsessed with a young Japanese woman (Hiroko Berghauer).

=== Love on the Run ===
Doinel's adventures come to a close in 1979's Love on the Run, where his romantic attentions shift from his ex-wife Christine to vinyl record seller Sabine Barnerias (Dorothée).

In Antoine and Colette and Love on the Run, flashbacks to Doinel's earlier life consist of footage from the previous films.

== Christine Darbon ==
Christine Darbon, portrayed by actress Claude Jade, first appears in the life of Antoine in Stolen Kisses. Subsequently she appeared in two more films, Bed and Board (now Christine Doinel) and Love on the Run, where, after divorcing Doinel, she again becomes Christine Darbon. Truffaut uses the occasion to examine three states, three ages, of the woman; loved from afar (Stolen Kisses), married and misled (Bed and Board), and divorced but still on good terms (Love on the Run). Christine is characterised by her good behaviour, the promptness of her glance, and a sense of sacrifice which is by no means "tragic". In the film Love on the Run, Antoine and Christine were the first couple in the country to divorce under a new law allowing dissolution of a marriage by mutual consent.

In a case of life imitating art, Christine can be seen as part of Truffaut's autobiography. While Antoine is seeking to seduce Christine in Stolen Kisses, in real life Truffaut fell in love with the actress who portrayed Christine, Claude Jade, becoming engaged to her. The two, however, did not marry. The character of Christine Darbon left an important and indelible mark on Truffaut's work: she is a character who never really reveals her emotions, whose sad smile is her only weapon to fight Antoine's cruelty, and whose soft glance barely manages to hide an inner wound.

== Theatre adaptation ==
The play Le roman d'Antoine Doinel is a stage adaptation of the five films – Les 400 coups, Antoine et Colette, Baisers volés, Domicile conjugal, and L'amour en fuite – which recount the adventures of Antoine Doinel, at five different ages and through several different eras. In 2019, Belgian playwright Antoine Laubin created this play. Starting with the separation of Antoine and Christine in the last film of the cycle as the framework plot, he linked all the films into a single play. The lead roles of Jean-Pierre Léaud and Claude Jade were played by Adrien Drumel (Antoine) and Sarah Lefèvre (Christine). The play premiered at De Facto in Brussels in 2019.

Le roman d'Antoine Doinel is partly based on the structure of this part, which closes the 'pentalogy' or Doinel cycle. From shifts to breaks, in a device that serves the character's ceaseless race, Antoine Laubin in turn draws a rhythmic, playful kaleidoscope, faithful to the grammar of the films and the spirit of their director.

— Sceneweb

== Criterion Collection ==
The entirety of "The Adventures of Antoine Doinel" has been made available as part of The Criterion Collection.
