= Hiroko Matsumoto =

Japanese model (1936–2003)

- 松本弘子
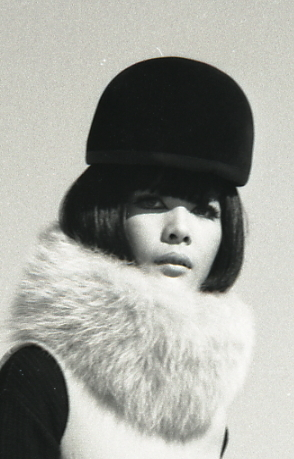
- Hiroko Matsumoto modelling for Pierre Cardin, Jerusalem, 1966
- Born: 11 August 1936; Tokyo, Japan
- Died: 21 June 2003 (aged 66); Paris, France
- Other names: Hiroko Berghauer; Hiroko Cathalan
- Occupation: Model
- Years active: 1960–1967
- Known for: Pierre Cardin, Hanae Mori Fashion House
- Spouses: Henry Berghauer (m. 1967) Jean-Claude Cathalan (m. 1970) (1970s, uncertain)
- Children: 1
- Modeling information
- Height: 1.74 m (5 ft 9 in)

Hiroko Matsumoto (Japanese: 松本 弘子, Hepburn: Matsumoto Hiroko; 11 August 1936 – 21 June 2003) was a Japanese model who worked in Paris during the 1960s. She is considered to be one of the first Japanese supermodels.

== Biography ==
Matsumoto met Pierre Cardin in his 1960 trip to Japan. She would eventually follow him to Paris where she was Cardin's top model. Known as Miss Hiroko, she was the first ever Japanese model for a French clothing collection.

Matsumoto ended her modeling career in 1967 and married Henry Berghauer, a manager at groupe Pierre Cardin. Berghauer went on to become a manager at Hanae Mori, and later of fashion company Hervé Léger. In 1970, Matsumoto played the prominent part of Kyoko, the Japanese lover, in French director François Truffaut's movie Bed and Board. Many of the dresses worn in the movie were designed by the Hanae Mori fashion company.

A few years later, Hiroko Matsumoto married Jean-Claude Cathalan, who, at the time, was a manager at Roussel Uclaf. He later became the president of Revillon, Parfums Caron, Jean-Louis Scherrer and is the current president of Comité Montaigne. Their daughter, Maxime Cathalan, was kidnapped in Neuilly-sur-Seine at the age of 20 months in front of her nurse. The child was returned on 23 June 1975 for a ransom of 1.5 million Franc.

In 2003, Hiroko Cathalan died in Paris at the age of 66 after a long period in the hospital. The cause of her death was not disclosed.

== Filmography ==
Year	Title	Role	Notes
1970	Bed and Board	Kyoko	
