= 1959 New York Film Critics Circle Awards =

25th New York Film Critics Circle Awards

25th New York Film Critics Circle Awards

January 23, 1960
(announced December 28, 1959)

Ben-Hur

The 25th New York Film Critics Circle Awards, honored the best filmmaking of 1959.

== Winners ==
- Best Film:
  - Ben-Hur
- Best Actor:
  - James Stewart – Anatomy of a Murder
- Best Actress:
  - Audrey Hepburn – The Nun's Story
- Best Director:
  - Fred Zinnemann – The Nun's Story
- Best Screenplay:
  - Wendell Mayes – Anatomy of a Murder
- Best Foreign Language Film:
  - The 400 Blows (Les quatre cents coups) • France
