= Lady Cops =

- Theatrical release poster
- Directed by: Josiane Balasko
- Written by: Josiane Balasko; Christian Biegalski; Jean-Bernard Pouy
- Produced by: Jean-Claude Fleury
- Starring: Josiane Balasko; Isaach de Bankolé
- Cinematography: Dominique Chapuis
- Edited by: Catherine Kelber
- Music by: Manu Dibango; Francis & Raoul Agbo; Stéphane Sirkis
- Production companies: Films A2; G.P.F.I. Images Investissements; Les Films Flam; Slav 1
- Distributed by: AMLF
- Release date: 16 December 1987
- Running time: 93 minutes
- Country: France
- Language: French
- Box office: $8 million

Lady Cops or Les Keufs is a 1987 French comedy film directed by Josiane Balasko.

== Plot ==
Mireille Molineux, police inspector, stalking pimps. With the complicity of Yasmina, a prostitute, she stops Charlie, her pimp. To avenge Mireille, Jean-Pierre, another pimp, accused of corruption. She then investigated two inspectors IGS: Blondel and Lacroix. Soon after, Charlie is released for lack of evidence. To keep Yasmina, he removes his son and threatened to kill him.

== Cast ==
- Josiane Balasko as Inspector Mireille Molyneux
- Isaach de Bankolé as Inspector Blaise Lacroix
- Jean-Pierre Léaud as Commissioner Bullfinch
- Ticky Holgado as Inspector Blondel
- Florent Pagny as Jean-Pierre
- Catherine Hiegel as Dany
- Dora Doll as Madame Lou
- Marie France as The coach
- Jean-Marie Marion as Charlie
- Patrick Pérez as Jeannot
- Patrick Olivier as Inspector Averell
- Jacques Delaporte as Inspector MacDo
- Max Vialle as The Captain
- Fred Romano as Lisa
- Rocky as Begude
- Jean-François Perrier as I.G.S. Captain
- Farida Khelfa as Yasmine
- Marie Pillet as Nadia
- Ludovic Paris as Camboulis
- Lilia as Manu
- Alex Descas
- Bruno Moynot
- Roschdy Zem

== Production ==
In 1988, the movie was screened to the Toronto International Film Festival.

== Accolades ==
Year	Award	Category	Recipient	Result
1988	César Awards	César Award for Best Supporting Actor	Jean-Pierre Léaud	Nominated
