= Daniel Ceccaldi =

French actor (1927–2003)

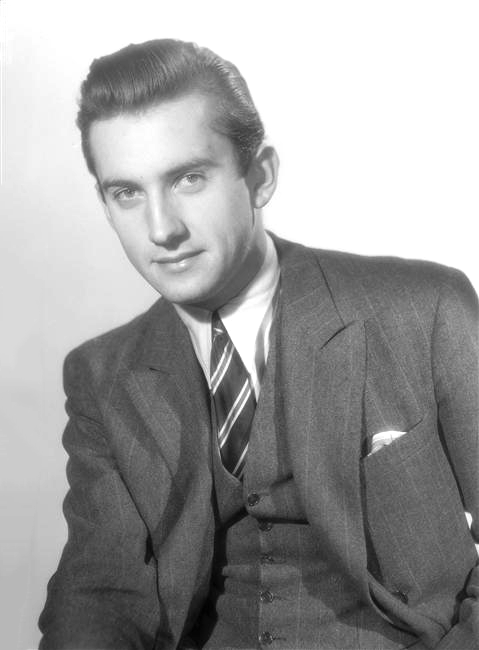
- Daniel Ceccaldi in 1946
- Born: 25 July 1927; Meaux, Seine-et-Marne, France
- Died: 27 March 2003 (aged 75); Villejuif, Val-de-Marne, France
- Occupations: Actor, Presenter
- Years active: 1954-2003

Daniel Ceccaldi (25 July 1927 – 27 March 2003) was a French actor.

He was born in Meaux, Seine-et-Marne, France. The mild-mannered Daniel Ceccaldi is famous as Claude Jade's father Lucien Darbon in François Truffaut's movies Stolen Kisses and Bed and Board. Note: Christine refers to him twice as "Lucien", not papa, indicating perhaps that he is not her biological father, echoing Truffaut's own experience. The American critic Bob Wade wrote about Ceccaldi in 'Stolen Kisses': "Claude Jade's parents are memorably played by Daniel Ceccaldi and Claire Duhamel. Ceccaldi’s role may represent the most pleasant and neurosis-free father in any movie of the era. He overflows with Dickensian warmth and geniality."

== Selected filmography ==
- The Lame Devil (1948) - Un laquais (uncredited)
- Maya (1949) - Un serveur du bistrot (uncredited)
- Miracles Only Happen Once (1951) - Un ami de Jérôme (uncredited)
- Une histoire d'amour (1951) - Le militaire qui tire mal à la fête foraine (uncredited)
- Judgement of God (1952) - Théobald - le commis de M. Bernauer et amoureux d'Agnès
- Deux de l'escadrille (1953)
- A Woman's Treasure (1953) - Le docteur
- Les amours finissent à l'aube (1953) - Fred, l'ami de Charlotte
- Mam'zelle Nitouche (1954) - Le troisième réserviste
- Queen Margot (1954) - Henri d'Anjou
- Caroline and the Rebels (1955) - Lieutenant Bogard
- Frou-Frou (1955) - Le chevalier des Grieux
- Nana (1955) - Le lieutenant Philippe Hugon (uncredited)
- The Grand Maneuver (1955) - Un officier (uncredited)
- Madelon (1955) - Un militaire chez Maxim's
- The Light Across the Street (1955) - L'amoureux en panne
- Marie Antoinette Queen of France (1956) - Drouet
- Mannequins of Paris (1956) - Un ami de Barbara
- Women's Club (1956)
- Bonsoir Paris (1956)
- Élisa (1957) - Le coiffeur
- The Adventures of Arsène Lupin (1957) - Jacques Gauthier
- Miss Pigalle (1958) - Dominique
- Witness in the City (1959) - Le client du taxi italien
- Dialogue of the Carmelites (1960) - L'officier
- Dans la gueule du loup (1961) - Roger
- Mourir d'amour (1961) - Richard Lanne
- The Lions Are Loose (1961) - Georges Guichard
- Famous Love Affairs (1961) - Antonio Villa (segment "Comédiennes, Les")
- Arsène Lupin Versus Arsène Lupin (1962) - Arsène Lupin (voice, uncredited)
- Les Bricoleurs (1963) - La Banque
- The Trip to Biarritz (1963) - Paul Bonnenfant
- Les Veinards (1963) - Gros nounours (segment "Le repas gastronomique")
- Pouic-Pouic (1963) - Pedro Castelli
- Girl's Apartment (1963) - François
- L'homme de Rio (That Man From Rio) (1964) - Police inspector
- FX 18 (1964) - Noreau
- La Peau douce (The Soft Skin) (1964) - Clément
- Requiem pour un caïd (1964) - Inspecteur Belin
- Patate (1964) - Michel - le barman
- Les gros bras (1964) - Giovannelli
- La bonne occase (1965) - Le vendeur
- Faites vos jeux, mesdames (1965) - Stéphane
- Cent briques et des tuiles (1965) - Léon / Bartender
- A Woman in White (1965) - L'inspecteur Georget (uncredited)
- La grosse caisse (1965) - Pignol
- God's Thunder (1965) - Le prêtre
- La Métamorphose des cloportes (1965) - L'inspecteur de police Lescure
- When the Pheasants Pass (1965) - Barnave
- Diamonds Are Brittle (1965) - Le capitaine du bateau
- Espionage in Lisbon (1965) - Robert Scott
- The Upper Hand (1966) - Le commissaire Noël
- Le facteur s'en va-t-en guerre (1966) - Cassagne
- Monsieur le Président Directeur Général (Appelez-moi Maître) (1966) - Calfarelli
- Caroline chérie (1968) - Récitant / Narrator (voice, uncredited)
- Les poneyttes (1968) - Letellier
- Stolen Kisses (Baisers volés) (1968) - Lucien Darbon
- A Golden Widow (1969) - Le conservateur du musée
- The Bear and the Doll (1970) - Ivan
- Bed and Board (Domicile conjugal) (1970) - Lucien Darbon
- L'Homme qui vient de la nuit (1971) - Inspecteur Coffinet
- Le leonesse (1971)
- Love in the Afternoon (1972) - Gérard
- Not Dumb, The Bird (1972) - Gérard Chardonnet
- Trop jolies pour être honnêtes (1972) - Le lieutenant de marine Jean-Yves Marie Le Gouennec
- Les zozos (1973) - L'oncle Jacques
- Le complot (1973) - Louis Carat
- Le concierge (1973) - Paul Raymond
- La chute d'un corps (1973) - Alain Renon
- Don't Cry with Your Mouth Full (1973) - Michel - le parrain
- Amore (1974) - Le P.D.G.
- The Four Charlots Musketeers (1974) - Louis XIII
- O.K. patron (1974) - Duguet
- France société anonyme (1974) - Michel, l'homme du gouvernement
- The Four Charlots Musketeers 2 (1974) - Louis XIII
- There's Nothing Wrong with Being Good to Yourself (C'est jeune et ça sait tout) (1974) - L'ambassadeur
- Le chaud lapin (1974) - Henri Lambert
- Dis-moi que tu m'aimes (1974) - Bertrand Danois
- A Happy Divorce (1975) - Antoine
- Incorrigible (1975) - Le préfet de police
- The Pink Telephone (1975) - Levêgue
- The Toy (1976) - Le père de famille
- The Porter from Maxim's (1976) - Du Velin
- Le maestro (1977) - Hubert Martin
- Death of a Corrupt Man (1977) - Lucien Lacor
- Un oursin dans la poche (1977) - L'administrateur du théâtre
- Holiday Hotel (1978) - Euloge St. Prix
- La Ballade des Dalton (1978) - Lucky Luke (voice)
- Ils sont fous ces sorciers (1978) - La Palière
- Confidences pour confidences (1979) - Emile Roussel, le père
- Le temps des vacances (1979) - Norbert
- Charles et Lucie (1979) - Charles
- Tous vedettes! (1980) - Jean-Paul
- The Wonderful Day (1980) - Felloux
- Celles qu'on n'a pas eues... (1981) - Guillaume
- The Plouffe Family (1981) - Père Alphonse
- For a Cop's Hide (1981) - Coccioli
- Ça va faire mal (1982) - Léopold
- Le Braconnier de Dieu (1983) - Le père abbé
- Adieu foulards (1983) - Gilbert Carboni
- L'amour en douce (1985) - Maître Ravignac
- Les Maris, les Femmes, les Amants (1989) - Jacques
- Twisted Obsession (1989) - Julien Legrand
- Barbara (1997) - Admiralen
- Un grand cri d'amour (1998) - Sylvestre
- Dieu seul me voit (1998) - Polling station président
- Portrait, Le (1999, TV Movie) - Simon Hardelot
- La vie ne me fait pas peur (1999) - Automobiliste
- Michael Strogoff (1999, TV Movie) - Count Krasow
- Le fils du Français (1999) - Monsieur Oliver
- Le Vélo de Ghislain Lambert (2001) - Maurice Focodel
- Hôpital souterrain (2002, TV Movie) - Commandant Destouche
- Elle est des nôtres (2003) - Le père de Christine
- Au bout du quai (2004, TV Movie) - Gerfault (final film role)
