= Love on the Run (1979 film) =

Film by François Truffaut

- Theatrical release poster
- French: L'amour en fuite
- Directed by: François Truffaut
- Written by: François Truffaut; Marie-France Pisier; Jean Aurel; Suzanne Schiffman
- Produced by: François Truffaut
- Starring: Jean-Pierre Léaud; Marie-France Pisier; Claude Jade; Dani; Dorothée; Daniel Mesguich; Julien Bertheau; Rosy Varte
- Cinematography: Néstor Almendros
- Edited by: Martine Barraqué
- Music by: Georges Delerue
- Production company: Les Films du Carrosse
- Distributed by: AMLF
- Release date: 29 January 1979
- Running time: 94 minutes
- Country: France
- Language: French
- Box office: 437,522 admissions (France)

Love on the Run (French: L'amour en fuite) is a 1979 French romantic comedy-drama film co-written and directed by François Truffaut, his fifth and final film about the character Antoine Doinel. Told in nonlinear fashion, with frequent flashbacks to the four previous films, it stars Jean-Pierre Léaud, Marie-France Pisier, Claude Jade, Dani and Dorothée. It was entered into the 29th Berlin International Film Festival.

== Plot ==
Years after their reconciliation, (Note: As depicted in Bed and Board (1970)) Antoine and his wife Christine are in the midst of divorce procedurals. While both take turns taking care of their son Alphonse, Antoine is dating Sabine, a record shop clerk. One day, as Antoine and Christine are leaving the courthouse after finalising their divorce, he is spotted by an ex-girlfriend of his, defense lawyer Colette. (Note: First introduced in Antoine and Colette (1962)) This makes her curious about Antoine and she goes to a bookstore after learning that he wrote a semi-autobiographical novel years before. The store's owner, Xavier, is Colette's current boyfriend, but she is unsure if he truly loves her.

At the Gare de Lyon, Colette boards a train bound for Aix-en-Provence, where she is due for a court case. Antoine is at the same station to drop off Alphonse, who is leaving for a summer music camp on a train on the opposite platform. Antoine calls Sabine from a phone booth to inform her that he will not be able to accompany her to her friend's party that night, as he had forgotten about Alphonse's trip. When Sabine expresses interest in meeting Alphonse, Antoine insists that it is too soon. Sabine complains about Antoine's penchant for secrecy, and he hangs up on her.

Antoine and Colette see each other, and he impulsively leaps aboard her train as it departs. She reads Antoine's book and discovers that he has edited events of his life (including their former relationship) to seem less desperate. Antoine surprises Colette in the dining car, and they have a conversation before she invites him back to her sleeping car. Pretending to be discussing a new novel he has been writing, Antoine reveals how he met Sabine: some time before, in a phone booth, a man destroyed a picture of her, his former lover. Antoine later found the torn-up photograph, reconstructed it with tape and was smitten with the face he found. He eventually tracked Sabine down to the record shop, where they began their relationship.

After talking for a while, Colette is disappointed to discover that Antoine is still as self-centered and immature as she remembered him to be. When he tries to kiss her, she backs off and declares that he has not learned anything from their past experiences. While sneaking off the moving train, Antoine accidentally drops Sabine's photo. Realising that his story was true, Colette decides to save the picture.

Antoine visits Sabine and apologises for hanging up on her, but having tired of his inattentiveness, she angrily gives him back the letters he has written to her. Antoine knows that, to save his relationship, he has to come clean about how he knew of Sabine, but realises that he lost the photo which could prove his story. At his work, he is traced by Lucien, (Note: First introduced in The 400 Blows (1959)) a lover of his mother who takes him to her grave, which Antoine never had searched for.

Meanwhile, Collette reads an inscription on the back of the photograph and learns that Sabine shares her last name with Xavier. She initially presumes that Sabine is Xavier's secret wife, but after returning to Paris, she discovers that she is his sister. Colette goes to Sabine's apartment to return the photograph to her, but she is not home. While on the stairs, Colette meets Christine. The two discuss Antoine, their lives, and their children. Christine reveals that she is divorcing Antoine because she caught him in bed with her friend Liliane during a summer holiday. Christine did not feel heartbroken by the incident, which made her realise that she was no longer in love with Antoine. Colette, on the other hand, reveals that she divorced her husband after their daughter (Note: First introduced in Stolen Kisses (1968)) died in an accident.

Realising that she must tell Xavier that she loves him, Colette gives Sabine's photo to Christine and leaves to reunite with him at the bookstore, where they kiss. Christine mails the photo to Antoine, who shows it to Sabine while revealing how they really met. Moved, Sabine reconciles with Antoine and they kiss.

== Cast ==
- Jean-Pierre Léaud as Antoine Doinel
- Marie-France Pisier as Colette
- Claude Jade as Christine Doinel
- Dani as Liliane
- Dorothée as Sabine Barnerias
- Rosy Varte as Colette's mother
- Marie Henriau as the divorce judge
- Daniel Mesguich as Xavier Barnerias
- Julien Bertheau as Monsieur Lucien
- Jean-Pierre Ducos as Christine's lawyer
- Pierre Dios as Maître Renard
- Alain Ollivier as the judge in Aix-en-Provence
- Julien Dubois as Alphonse Doinel
- Monique Dury as Madame Ida
- Emmanuel Clot as Antoine's friend at the printing press

== Reception ==
On the review aggregator website Rotten Tomatoes, the film holds an approval rating of 62% based on 13 reviews, with an average rating of 6.3/10.

The New York Times placed the film on its "Best 1,000 Movies Ever" list.
