= Jean-François Adam =

French actor and director

- Born: 1935 or 1936; Paris, France
- Died: 14 October 1980 (aged 44); Paris, France
- Occupations: Actor and director
- Spouse: Brigitte Fossey (1966–1980, his death)
- Children: 1

Jean-François Adam (1935 or 1936 – 14 October 1980) was a French actor and director.

== Career ==
Adam was an assistant to French filmmakers François Truffaut and Jean-Pierre Melville.

He is known for having played the small role of Colette's lover in the Antoine Doinel saga, and for playing the philosophy teacher in the French drama film Graduate First (1978), directed by Maurice Pialat.

Adam directed the French drama film Return to the Beloved (1979), which stars Isabelle Huppert.

He was also a part-time clown.

== Personal life ==
Adam was married to Brigitte Fossey, and had a daughter, the actress Marie Adam. At the age of 44 Adam shot himself.

== See also ==
- Cinema of France
- List of French actors
- List of French film directors
