= The 400 Blows =

1959 film by François Truffaut

- Theatrical release poster
- Directed by: François Truffaut
- Written by: François Truffaut; Marcel Moussy
- Produced by: François Truffaut; Georges Charlot
- Starring: Jean-Pierre Léaud; Claire Maurier; Albert Rémy; Guy Decomble; Georges Flamant; Patrick Auffay
- Cinematography: Henri Decaë
- Edited by: Marie-Josèphe Yoyotte; Cécile Decugis; Michèle de Possel
- Music by: Jean Constantin
- Production company: Les Films du Carrosse
- Distributed by: Cocinor
- Release date: 4 May 1959 (France)
- Running time: 99 minutes
- Country: France
- Language: French
- Box office: $30.7 million

The 400 Blows (French: Les quatre cents coups) is a 1959 French coming-of-age drama film, and the directorial debut of François Truffaut, who also co-wrote the film. Shot in the anamorphic format DyaliScope, the film stars Jean-Pierre Léaud, Albert Rémy, and Claire Maurier. One of the defining films of the French New Wave, it displays many of the characteristic traits of the movement. Written by Truffaut and Marcel Moussy, the film is about Antoine Doinel (a semi-autobiographical character), a misunderstood adolescent in Paris, who struggles with his parents and teachers due to his rebellious behavior. It was filmed on location, in Paris and Honfleur.

The 400 Blows received numerous awards and nominations, including the Cannes Film Festival Award for Best Director, the OCIC Award, and a Palme d'Or nomination in 1959, and was also nominated for an Academy Award for Best Original Screenplay in 1960. The film had 4.1 million admissions in France, making it Truffaut's most successful film in his home country.

The 400 Blows is widely considered one of the best films ever made; in the 2022 Sight & Sound critics' poll of the greatest films ever made, it was ranked 50th. It ranked 33rd in the directors' poll on the same list.

It is the first in a series of five films in which Léaud plays the lead character. The film is followed by a short film, Antoine and Colette (1962) and three sequels, Stolen Kisses (1968), Bed and Board (1970) and Love on the Run (1979), with the actor reprising his role as Doinel.

== Plot ==
Antoine Doinel (Jean-Pierre Léaud) in the final scene

Antoine Doinel is a young boy growing up in Paris. Misunderstood by his parents for skipping school and stealing, and tormented in school for disciplinary problems by his teacher (such as writing on the classroom wall and later lying about his absences as being due to his mother's death), he frequently runs away from both places. He finally quits school after his teacher accuses him of plagiarizing Balzac, though Antoine loves Balzac and in a school essay he describes "the death of my grandfather," in a close paraphrase of Balzac from memory. He steals a Royal typewriter from his stepfather's workplace to finance his plans to leave home, but being unable to sell it, he is apprehended while trying to return it.

The stepfather turns Antoine over to police and Antoine spends the night in jail, sharing a cell with prostitutes and thieves. During an interview with the judge, Antoine's mother confesses that her husband is not her son's biological father. Antoine is placed in an observation center for troubled youths near the seashore (as his mother wished). A psychologist at the center looks for reasons for Antoine's unhappiness, which the youth reveals in a fragmented series of monologues.

While playing football with the other boys, Antoine escapes under a fence and runs away to the ocean, which he has always wanted to see. He reaches the shoreline of the sea and runs into it. The film concludes with a freeze-frame of Antoine, which, via an optical effect, zooms in on his face as he looks into the camera.

== Cast ==
- Jean-Pierre Léaud as Antoine Doinel
- Albert Rémy as Julien Doinel, Antoine's stepfather
- Claire Maurier as Gilberte Doinel, Antoine's mother
- Guy Decomble as Sourpuss, schoolteacher
- Patrick Auffay as René Bigey, Antoine's best friend
- Georges Flamant as Monsieur Bigey, René's father
- Pierre Repp as an English teacher
- Daniel Couturier as Betrand Mauricet
- Luc Andrieux as Le professeur de gym
- Robert Beauvais as director of the school
- Yvonne Claudie as Mme Bigey
- Marius Laurey as L'inspecteur Cabanel
- Claude Mansard as the examining magistrate
- Jacques Monod as commissioner
- Henri Virlojeux as the night watchman
- Jeanne Moreau as a woman looking for her dog
- Jean-Claude Brialy as a man trying to pick up a woman

Truffaut also included a number of friends (fellow directors) in bit or background parts, including himself and Philippe De Broca in the funfair scene; Jacques Demy as a policeman; Jean-Luc Godard and Jean-Paul Belmondo as overheard voices (Belmondo is heard in the print works scene).

== Themes ==
The semi-autobiographical film reflects events of Truffaut's life. In style, it references other French works—most notably a scene borrowed wholesale from Jean Vigo's Zéro de conduite. Truffaut dedicated the film to the man who became his spiritual father, André Bazin, who died just as the film was about to be shot.

Besides being a character study, the film is an exposé of the injustices of the treatment of juvenile offenders in France at the time.

According to Annette Insdorf writing for the Criterion Collection, the film is "rooted in Truffaut's childhood." This includes how both Antoine and Truffaut "found a substitute home in the movie theater" and both did not know their biological fathers.

== Production ==
=== Title ===
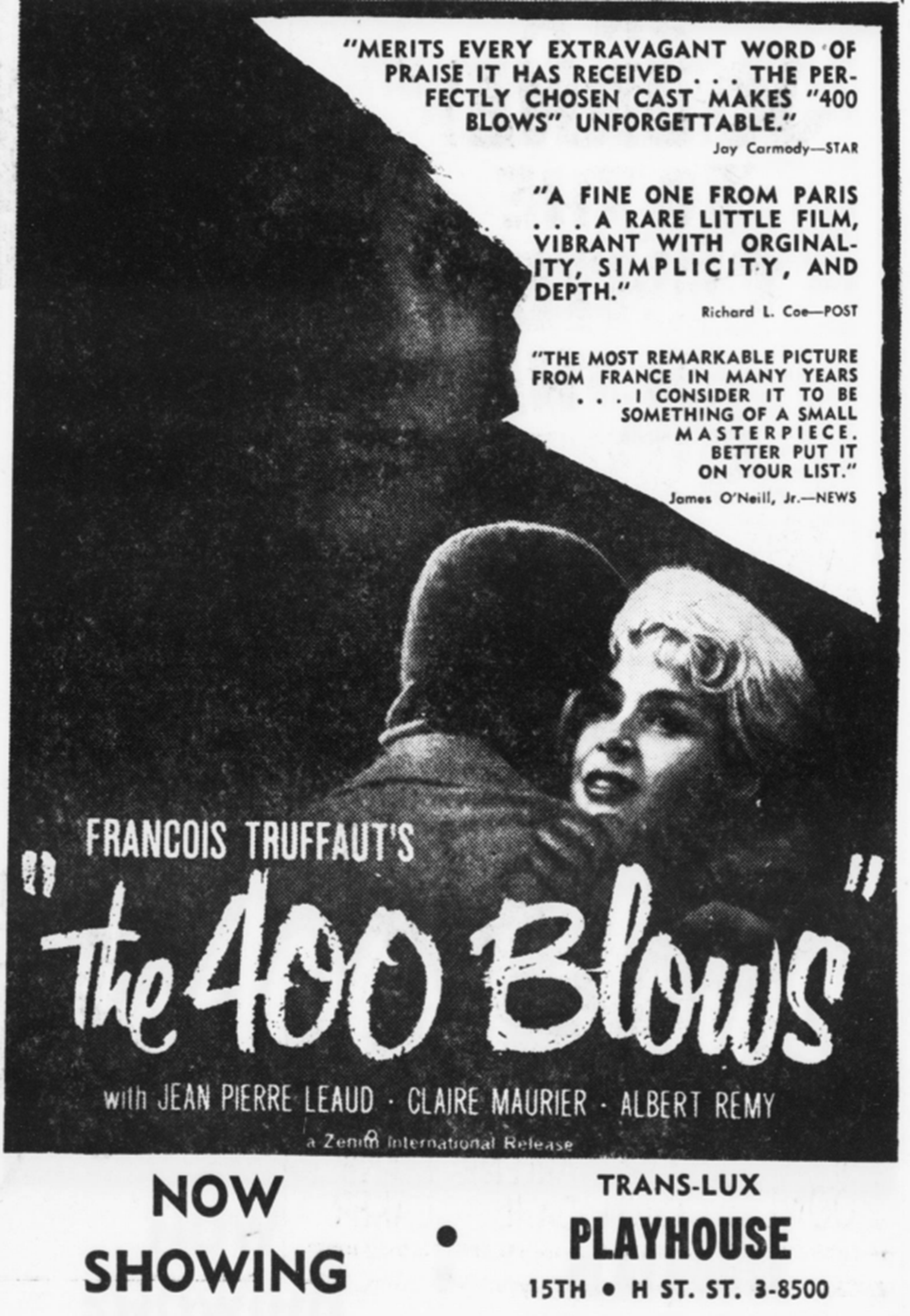
Theatrical advertisement from 1959

The English title is a literal translation of the French that fails to capture its meaning, as the French title refers to the idiom "faire les quatre cents coups", meaning "to raise hell". On the first prints in the United States, subtitler and dubber Noelle Gillmor translated the title as Wild Oats, but the distributor Zenith did not like that and reverted it to The 400 Blows.

=== Filming locations ===
Most of The 400 Blows was filmed in Paris:

- Avenue Frochot, Paris 9th
- Eiffel Tower, Champ de Mars, Paris 7th
- Montmartre, Paris 18th
- Palais de Chaillot, Trocadéro, Paris 16th
- Pigalle, Paris 9th
- Rue Fontaine
- Sacré Cœur, Paris 18th

The exception was for scenes filmed at the reform school, which were filmed in Honfleur, a small coastal town in the northern French province of Normandy. The final beach scene was filmed in Villers-sur-Mer, a few miles to the southwest.

== Release ==
=== Reception ===
The film opened the 1959 Cannes Film Festival and was widely acclaimed, winning numerous awards, including the Best Director Award at Cannes, the Critics Award of the 1959 New York Film Critics' Circle and the Best European Film Award at 1960's Bodil Awards. It was nominated for Best Original Screenplay at the 32nd Academy Awards. The film holds a 99% rating on Rotten Tomatoes, based on 71 reviews, with a weighted average of 9.4/10. The website's critical consensus states, "A seminal French New Wave film that offers an honest, sympathetic, and wholly heartbreaking observation of adolescence without trite nostalgia."

The film is among the top 10 of the British Film Institute's list of 50 films that should be seen by age 15.

=== Awards and nominations ===
Year	Association	Category	Title	Result	Ref.
1959	Cannes Film Festival	Palme d'Or	François Truffaut	Nominated	
1959	Cannes Film Festival	Best Director	François Truffaut	Won	
1959	Cannes Film Festival	OCIC Award	François Truffaut	Won	
1959	New York Film Critics Circle Awards	Best Foreign Language Film	The 400 Blows	Won	
1959	Cahiers du cinéma	Annual Top 10 List	François Truffaut	5th	
1960	Academy Awards	Best Original Screenplay	François Truffaut, Marcel Moussy	Nominated	
1960	Bodil Awards	Best European Film	The 400 Blows	Won	
1960	French Syndicate of Cinema Critics	Best Film	The 400 Blows	Won	
1961	BAFTA	Best Film from Any Source	François Truffaut	Nominated	
1961	BAFTA	Most Promising Newcomer	Jean-Pierre Léaud	Nominated	
1961	Sant Jordi Awards	Best Foreign Director	François Truffaut	Won	

== Legacy ==
Truffaut made four other films with Léaud depicting Antoine at later stages of his life: Antoine and Colette (which was Truffaut's contribution to the 1962 anthology Love at Twenty), Stolen Kisses, Bed and Board, and Love on the Run.

Filmmakers Akira Kurosawa, Luis Buñuel, Satyajit Ray, Steven Spielberg, Jean Cocteau, Carl Theodor Dreyer, Richard Linklater, Tsai Ming Liang, Woody Allen, Richard Lester, Edgar Wright, P C Sreeram, Norman Jewison, Wes Anderson and Nicolas Cage have cited The 400 Blows as one of their favorite movies, with Kurosawa calling it "one of the most beautiful films that I have ever seen".

Martin Scorsese included it on a list of "39 Essential Foreign Films for a Young Filmmaker."

The film was ranked #29 in Empire magazine's list of "The 100 Best Films of World Cinema" in 2010. In 2018, the film was voted the eighth greatest foreign-language film of all time in BBC's poll of 209 critics in 43 countries.

The festival poster for the 71st Venice International Film Festival paid tribute to the film as it featured the character of Antoine Doinel portrayed by Jean-Pierre Léaud.
