= Mississippi Mermaid =

1969 film by François Truffaut

- French theatrical release poster
- French: La Sirène du Mississipi
- Directed by: François Truffaut
- Screenplay by: François Truffaut
- Based on: Waltz into Darkness by William Irish
- Produced by: Marcel Berbert; François Truffaut
- Starring: Jean-Paul Belmondo; Catherine Deneuve; Michel Bouquet
- Cinematography: Denys Clerval
- Edited by: Agnès Guillemot
- Music by: Antoine Duhamel
- Production companies: Les Films du Carrosse; Les Productions Artistes Associés; Produzioni Associate Delphos
- Distributed by: Les Artistes Associés (France); Dear Film (Italy)
- Release dates: 18 June 1969 (France); 14 February 1970 (Italy)
- Running time: 123 minutes
- Countries: France; Italy
- Language: French
- Budget: $1.6 million
- Box office: $7.3 million; 1,227,657 admissions (France)

Mississippi Mermaid (French: La Sirène du Mississipi) is a 1969 romantic crime drama film written and directed by François Truffaut and starring Jean-Paul Belmondo and Catherine Deneuve. Adapted from the 1947 novel Waltz into Darkness by William Irish, the film follows a tobacco planter on the island of Réunion who becomes engaged through correspondence to a woman he does not know. When she arrives, it is not the same woman in the photo, but he marries her anyway.

Shot in Southern France and on Réunion, Mississippi Mermaid was the 16th highest-grossing film of 1969 in France, with a total of 1,227,657 admissions. It was remade in 2001 as Original Sin, directed by Michael Cristofer and starring Angelina Jolie and Antonio Banderas.

== Plot ==
Louis Mahé, a wealthy tobacco plantation owner on the island of Réunion in the Indian Ocean, awaits the arrival of his bride-to-be, Julie Roussel, whom he has never met. They became acquainted through the personals column of a French newspaper and have been corresponding. At the Hotel Mascarin, he meets his business partner Jardine who accompanies him to pick up the ring. Louis drives to the dock to greet Julie, who is arriving on the steamer Mississipi (Note: Spelled with one "p" according to the French spelling of the river at the time) from Nouméa, the capital of New Caledonia. When they meet, he is surprised by her beauty and does not recognize her, as she is not the woman in the photo that she had sent him. She explains that she sent the photo of a neighbor to ensure his sincerity. He confesses that he too has not told the complete truth, having hidden that he was wealthy.

They quickly marry, and his adoration makes him overlook inconsistencies between her comments and her letters. He gives Julie access to his bank accounts and prints her image on the cigarette packs his company manufactures. After receiving an angry letter from Julie's sister, Berthe Roussel, demanding to know Julie's whereabouts, Louis returns home to find that Julie has gone with nearly 28 million francs, all but emptying his bank accounts. Soon afterwards, Berthe arrives and informs him that his wife was not Julie and that she saw her sister board the Mississipi. They hire a private detective, Comolli, to track down the impostor.

On a flight to Nice, France, Louis collapses from exhaustion. While recuperating in the Clinique Heurtebise sanitarium, he sees Julie's impostor on television, dancing at a nightclub in Antibes. He buys a gun and travels to Antibes where he breaks into her room at the Hotel Monorail, intent on killing her. When she returns and is confronted by Louis, she offers no resistance. Explaining that her real name is Marion Vergano, she tells him of her sordid past; of her years in prison and association with a heartless gangster, Richard, who was with her on the Mississipi. She recounts that when they met Julie Roussel and learned of her forthcoming marriage, Richard devised a plot to kill Julie and send Marion in her place to rob Louis. Afterwards, Richard forced her to go through with the robbery and then abandoned her. She tells Louis that she loves him, and Louis forgives her.

They buy a convertible and drive to Aix-en-Provence, where they move into a house and spend their days traveling the region. Their happiness is interrupted by Comolli, who has arrived in Aix on the trail of the impostor. After failing to bribe the detective to drop the case, Louis shoots him dead and buries him in the wine cellar. Louis and Marion flee to Lyon, but she grows dissatisfied with their fugitive existence and longs for a life of luxury in Paris. Louis returns briefly to Réunion and sells his share in the plantation to his partner, Jardine. Upon his return, he finds the police on their trail. They are again forced to flee, leaving most of his money behind.

They head into the mountains where they find an isolated cabin. They hope to cross into Switzerland, but Marion is unhappy with their life on the run. Louis becomes increasingly ill and, after nearly collapsing, suspects that Marion has been poisoning his coffee. He attempts to escape, but Marion brings him back. As she pours him another glass of coffee, he reveals his knowledge of her plan, accepts his fate with no regrets, and expresses his love for her. Ashamed at her actions, Marion knocks the glass from Louis' hand and vows to make amends. She acknowledges that no woman deserves to be so loved, but assures him that she loves him, too, and that they can still go away together. Crying in his arms, Marion tells him, "I'm learning what love is, Louis. It's painful." After Louis regains his strength, they leave in a snowstorm and head towards the border.

== Cast ==
- Jean-Paul Belmondo as Louis Mahé
- Catherine Deneuve as Julie Roussel / Marion Vergano
- Nelly Borgeaud as Berthe Roussel
- Martine Ferrière as the landlady
- Marcel Berbert as Jardine
- Yves Drouhet as the detective
- Michel Bouquet as Comolli
- Roland Thénot as Richard

== Production ==
Principal photography began from 2 December 1968 to 28 February 1969.

=== Filming locations ===
- Aix-en-Provence, Bouches-du-Rhône, France
- Antibes, Alpes-Maritimes, France
- Grenoble, Isère, France
- Le Tampon, Réunion
- Lyon, Rhône, Rhône-Alpes, France
- Nice, Alpes-Maritimes, France
- Saint-Denis, Réunion
- Sainte-Anne, Réunion
- Sainte-Suzanne, Réunion

== Reception ==
=== Box office ===
Mississippi Mermaid was the 16th highest-grossing film of 1969 at the French box office, with a total of 1,227,657 admissions.

=== Critical response ===
In his review in The New York Times, Vincent Canby wrote that the film "defies easy definition and blithely triumphs over what initially appears to be structural schizophrenia." Canby noted the performances of Belmondo, Deneuve, and Bouquet, which were "played with marvelous style." Canby concluded:

In Mississippi Mermaid, as in all of Truffaut's films, love leads only to an uncertain future that, at best, may contain some joy along with the inevitable misery. Truffaut's special talent, however, is for communicating a sense of the value of that joy.

In his review in the San Francisco Chronicle in 1999, film critic Edward Guthmann praised the film, writing:

Truffaut tells his story with terrific dispatch, as if he was thrilled by its possibilities and couldn't wait to share his enthusiasm ... the result is a cool combo of film noir, star vehicle and picaresque romance. It's vintage Truffaut, and a great way to get acquainted or reacquainted with one of cinema's true masters.

On the review aggregator website Rotten Tomatoes, the film holds an approval rating of 83% based on 18 reviews, with an average rating of 7.8/10.
