= Claire Duhamel =

French actress

Claire Duhamel (September 6, 1925 – February 7, 2014) was a French film and stage actress, whose credits included Stolen Kisses in 1968 and Bed and Board in 1970. She died on February 7, 2014, at the age of 88.

== Filmography ==
Year	Title	Role	Notes
1949	Le droit de l'enfant	Cécile Herbelin	
1950	Cartouche, King of Paris	Henriette	
1951	Great Man	Catherine Delage	
1953	Une nuit à Megève	Magali	
1953	The Earrings of Madame de…	La demoiselle de compagnie	Uncredited
1956	Manequins de Paris		
1957	Le grand bluff		
1960	Fortunat	La secrétaire de mairie	
1966	A nous deux, Paris!	Hélène Haguenauer	
1966	The War Is Over	La femme du wagon-restaurant / Traveller	
1968	L'Homme à la Buick	Mme Dodelin	
1968	Je t'aime, je t'aime	Jane Swolfs	
1968	Stolen Kisses	Madame Darbon	
1970	Bed and Board	Madame Darbon	
1997	Mange ta soupe		
