= Jean-Pierre Léaud =

French actor (born 1944)

Jean-Pierre Léaud ComM
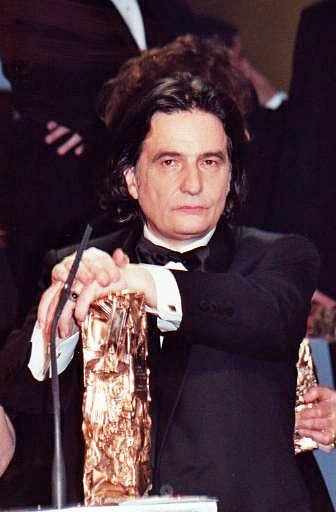
- Léaud at the 2000 César Awards
- Born: 28 May 1944 (age 82); Paris, France
- Occupation: Actor
- Years active: 1958–present
- Spouse: Brigitte Duvivier (m. 2007)
- Parent(s): Jacqueline Pierreux; Pierre Léaud
- Awards: Silver Bear for Best Actor; Masculin Féminin (1966); Best Actor (Thessaloniki Film Festival); 1996 Pour rire! Honorary César; FIPRESCI Prize (2000); The Pornographer (2001)

Jean-Pierre Léaud (French: [ʒɑ̃pjɛʁ le.o]; born 28 May 1944) is a French actor best known for being an important figure of the French New Wave and his portrayal of Antoine Doinel in a series of films by François Truffaut, beginning with The 400 Blows (1959). He has worked with Jean-Luc Godard, Agnès Varda, and Jacques Rivette, as well as other notable directors such as Jean Cocteau, Pier Paolo Pasolini, Bernardo Bertolucci, Jean Eustache, Catherine Breillat, Jerzy Skolimowski, and Aki Kaurismäki.

== Early life ==
Born in Paris, Léaud made his major debut as an actor at the age of 14 as Antoine Doinel, a semi-autobiographical character based on the life events of French film director François Truffaut, in The 400 Blows. To cast the two central characters, Antoine Doinel and his partner-in-crime René Bigey, Truffaut published an announcement in France-Soir and auditioned several hundred children in September and October 1958. Jean Domarchi, a critic at Cahiers du cinéma, had earlier recommended the son of an assistant scriptwriter, Pierre Léaud, and the actress Jacqueline Pierreux. Patrick Auffay was cast as René.

Truffaut was immediately captivated by the fourteen-year-old Léaud, who had already appeared with Jean Marais in Georges Lampin's La Tour, prends garde ! (1958). He recognized traits they both shared, "for example a certain suffering with regard to the family...With, however, this fundamental difference: though we were both rebels, we hadn't expressed our rebellion in the same way. I preferred to cover up and lie. Jean-Pierre, on the contrary, seeks to hurt, shock and wants it to be known...Why? Because he's unruly, while I was sly. Because his excitability requires that things happen to him, and when they don't occur quickly enough, he provokes them". In his final interview, Truffaut mentioned he was happy with how Léaud improvised within the flexibly written script.

Jean-Pierre Léaud, then in the eighth grade at a private school in Pontigny, was a far from ideal student. The director of the school wrote this to Truffaut, "I regret to inform you that Jean-Pierre is more and more 'unmanageable'. Indifference, arrogance, permanent defiance, lack of discipline in all its forms. He has twice been caught leafing through pornographic pictures in the dorm. He is developing more and more into an emotionally disturbed case". But this unstable boy, who often ran away with the older students on their nights out, could also be brilliant, generous, and affectionate. Extremely cultured for his age, he was already very good at writing, and he even claimed to Truffaut that he had written a "verse tragedy", Torquatus.

== Truffaut's influence from adolescence into adulthood ==
Throughout the production of The 400 Blows (Les Quatre Cents Coups, 1959), wrote Jay Carr, "Truffaut would take Léaud to see rushes of Godard's Breathless each evening. They'd sit up late talking film with Godard, Rivette, Rohmer, Eustache, Orson Welles." Upon the filmmaker's death, the actor reminisced Truffaut was the first person he admired and that he "spoke to children like they were adults. He realized that children understood things better than adults did. He was purely intuitive. We operated in a sort of complicity."

During and following the filming of The 400 Blows, Truffaut's concern for Léaud extended beyond the film set. He took charge of the difficult adolescent's upbringing after Léaud was expelled from school and kicked out of the home of the retired couple taking care of him. Truffaut subsequently rented a studio apartment for Léaud. Truffaut also hired him for assistant work on The Soft Skin (La peau douce, 1964) and Mata Hari, Agent H21 (1964).

== Acting career ==
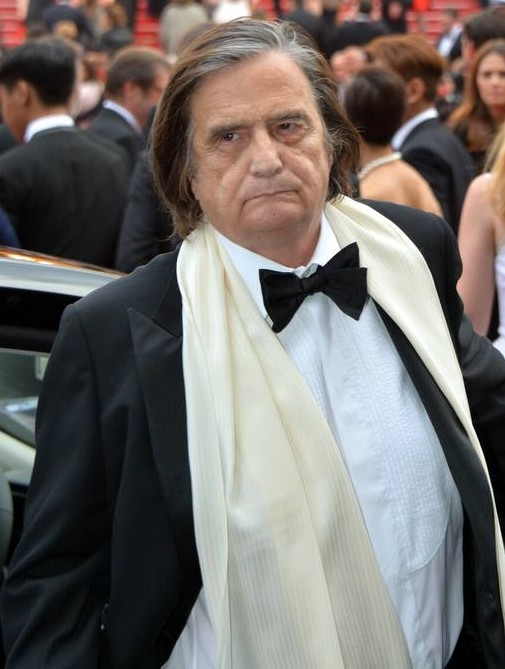
Léaud at the 2016 Cannes Film Festival.

Léaud starred in four more Truffaut films depicting the life of Doinel, spanning a period of 20 years—after the short-film Antoine et Colette in 1962—beside actress Claude Jade as his girlfriend, and then wife, Christine. Those films are Stolen Kisses (1968), Bed and Board (1970) and Love on the Run (1979). Truffaut stated that Léaud was the source of inspiration for the Antoine Doinel character and "I created some scenes just because I knew he would be funny in them—at least I laughed during the writing as I thought of him." He also collaborated with Truffaut on non-Antoine Doinel films like Two English Girls (Les Deux Anglaises et le Continent, 1971) and Day for Night (La Nuit américaine, 1973) and became the actor most commonly affiliated with him. Although Antoine Doinel is his most familiar character, he often found his performances in other films to be compared to his Doinel character whether there were legitimate similarities or not.

Léaud is one of the most visible and well-known actors to be associated with the French New Wave film movement and, aside from his work with Truffaut, collaborated with Jean-Luc Godard (nine films), Jean Eustache, Jacques Rivette and Agnès Varda. The early 1970s was perhaps the peak of his professional career when he had three critically acclaimed films released: Bertolucci's Last Tango in Paris (1972), Truffaut's La Nuit américaine, and Eustache's The Mother and the Whore (both 1973). In the Bertolucci film, Léaud appeared in the same film as a hero of his, Marlon Brando, although the two men never met, since all of Léaud's scenes were shot on Saturdays and Brando refused to work on Saturdays.

In March 1966, Léaud won the Silver Bear for Best Actor at the 16th Berlin International Film Festival for his role in Jean-Luc Godard's Masculin, féminin. He was nominated for a César Award for Best Supporting Actor in 1988 for Les Keufs and was awarded an Honorary César for lifetime achievement in 2000.

Léaud acted in films by other influential directors, such as Pier Paolo Pasolini, Jerzy Skolimowski, Aki Kaurismäki, Olivier Assayas, Tsai Ming-liang, Bertrand Bonello and Albert Serra.

== Personal life ==
He is married to the French actress Brigitte Duvivier.

== Honours and awards ==
=== Awards ===
- (1961) Nominated for the BAFTA Film Award for being the "Most Promising Newcomer to Leading Film Roles" for his role in The 400 Blows (1959).
- (1966) Won the Silver Bear for Best Actor at the Berlin International Film Festival for his role in Masculin Féminin.
- (1987) Nominated for César Award for Best Supporting Actor at the César Awards for his role in the film Les keufs.
- (1996) Won "Best Actor" at the Thessaloniki Film Festival for his role in Pour rire!
- (2000) Received the Honorary César at the César Awards.
- (2001) Shared the FIPRESCI Prize with Bertrand Bonello for his role in The Pornographer.
- (2016) Received the Honorary Palme d'Or at the 2016 Cannes Film Festival
- (2017) Won the Lumière Award for Best Actor for his role in The Death of Louis XIV.

=== Honours ===
- Commander of the Order of Merit, Portugal (12 January 2017)

== Selected filmography ==
Year	Title	Director	Role
1958	King on Horseback	Georges Lampin	Pierrot
1959	The 400 Blows	François Truffaut	Antoine Doinel
1960	Boulevard	Julien Duvivier	Jojo
1960	Testament of Orpheus	Jean Cocteau	Dargelos
1962	Antoine and Colette	François Truffaut (2)	Antoine Doinel
1965	Pierrot le Fou	Jean-Luc Godard	A Spectator
1965	Love at Sea	Guy Gilles	Cameo Appearance
1966	Le Père Noël a les yeux bleus	Jean Eustache	Daniel
1966	Made in U.S.A.	Jean-Luc Godard (2)	Donald Siegel
1966	Masculin Féminin	Jean-Luc Godard (3)	Paul
1966	Alphaville	Jean-Luc Godard (4)	The Waiter
1967	Weekend	Jean-Luc Godard (5)	Saint-Just
1967	La Chinoise	Jean-Luc Godard (6)	Guillaume
1967	The Departure	Jerzy Skolimowski	Marc
1968	Stolen Kisses	François Truffaut (3)	Antoine Doinel
1969	Pigsty	Pier Paolo Pasolini	Julian Klotz
1969	Joy of Learning	Jean-Luc Godard (7)	Le Rousseau
1969	The Heirs	Carlos Diegues	Danton
1970	Bed and Board	François Truffaut (4)	Antoine Doinel
1970	The Seven Headed Lion	Glauber Rocha	Preacher
1971	Two English Girls	François Truffaut (5)	Claude Roc
1971	Out 1	Jacques Rivette	Colin
1972	Last Tango in Paris	Bernardo Bertolucci	Tom
1973	The Mother and the Whore	Jean Eustache (2)	Alexandre
1973	Day for Night	François Truffaut (6)	Alphonse
1979	Love on the Run	François Truffaut (7)	Antoine Doinel
1981	Help Me Dream	Pupi Avati	Mario
1985	Treasure Island	Raúl Ruiz	Midas
1985	Détective	Jean-Luc Godard (8)	Inspector Neveu
1987	Les keufs	Josiane Balasko	Commissioner Bullfinch
1988	36 Fillette	Catherine Breillat	Boris Golovine
1989	Bunker Palace Hôtel	Enki Bilal	Solal
1990	I Hired a Contract Killer	Aki Kaurismäki	Henri Boulanger
1991	Paris Awakens	Olivier Assayas	Clément
1992	La Vie de Bohème	Aki Kaurismäki (2)	Blancheron
1993	La Naissance de l'amour	Philippe Garrel	Marcus
1995	One Hundred and One Nights	Agnès Varda	Jean-Pierre
1996	My Man	Bertrand Blier	Monsieur Claude
1996	Irma Vep	Olivier Assayas (2)	René Vidal
2001	The Pornographer	Bertrand Bonello	Jacques Laurent
2001	What Time Is It There?	Tsai Ming-Liang	Jean-Pierre/Man at Cemetery
2004	Folle embellie	Dominique Cabrera	Fernand
2005	J'ai vu tuer Ben Barka	Serge Le Péron and Saïd Smihi	Georges Franju
2009	Face	Tsai Ming-Liang (2)	Antoine/King Herodes
2011	Le Havre	Aki Kaurismäki (3)	The Informer
2012	Camille redouble	Noémie Lvovsky	The Jeweller
2014	La collection: Ecrire pour... la trentaine vue par des écrivains (2014 TV Mini-Series)		Cameo appearance in "Rosa mystica" episode
2016	The Death of Louis XIV	Albert Serra	Louis XIV
2017	M.	Sara Forestier	Lila's father
2017	The Lion Sleeps Tonight	Nobuhiro Suwa	Jean
2018	Alien Crystal Palace	Arielle Dombasle	Horus
2019	C'è tempo	Walter Veltroni	Himself
