= Bed and Board (film) =

1970 film by François Truffaut

- Theatrical release poster
- French: Domicile conjugal
- Directed by: François Truffaut
- Written by: François Truffaut; Claude de Givray; Bernard Revon
- Produced by: Marcel Berbert
- Starring: Jean-Pierre Léaud; Claude Jade; Mademoiselle Hiroko; Barbara Laage; Danièle Girard; Silvana Blasi; Daniel Boulanger; Daniel Ceccaldi; Pierre Fabre; Jacques Jouanneau; Jacques Rispal; Claude Véga
- Cinematography: Nestor Almendros
- Edited by: Agnés Guillemot
- Music by: Antoine Duhamel
- Production companies: Les Films du Carrosse; Valoria Films; Fida Cinematografica
- Distributed by: Valoria Films (France); Fida Cinematografica (Italy)
- Release dates: 9 September 1970 (France); 31 January 1971 (Italy)
- Running time: 100 minutes
- Countries: France; Italy
- Language: French
- Box office: 1,010,797 admissions (France)

Bed and Board (French: Domicile conjugal, lit. 'Marital Home') is a 1970 romantic comedy-drama film co-written and directed by François Truffaut, and starring Jean-Pierre Léaud and Claude Jade. It is the fourth in Truffaut's series of five films about Antoine Doinel, and directly follows Stolen Kisses (1968), depicting the married life of Antoine (Léaud) and Christine (Jade). Love on the Run concluded the story in 1979.

== Plot ==
Antoine and Christine are now married and living in a small apartment in Paris that her parents have found for them. In it, she gives violin lessons, while he works in the courtyard dyeing carnations for flower shops. When his experiments with colouring agents backfire, he loses his job. He learns that an American hydraulics company is hiring and, despite speaking very little English, Antoine applies for the job. His opponent is a much more qualified candidate with a letter of recommendation that proves it. However, the company's owner ends up believing the letter refers to Antoine, and hires him. The secretary tries to fix this mistake but is ignored.

Antoine's new job consists of demonstrating model boats to potential customers in a mock-up harbour. Christine gives birth to a baby boy, whom she names Ghislain, but Antoine registers him as Alphonse, preferring that name. Despite initially hating that name (believing it sounds too "provincial") and vowing to change it back, Christine eventually ends up calling the baby Alphonse.

While at work, Antoine meets a young Japanese woman named Kyoko, the daughter of a client, and is smitten with her. He watches her play alone with the boats; she accidentally drops her bracelet in the mock-up harbour, though she leaves without mentioning the incident to anyone. Antoine later recovers the bracelet and goes to her apartment. Kyoko is moved by this gesture, and the two begin an affair. Unaware that he is married, she falls deeply in love with Antoine and sends him a bouquet of tulips with love notes hidden in their petals. Antoine tries to get rid of the tulips, but they are eventually found by Christine. He passes them off as a gift to Christine, who gladly puts them in a vase. However, she finds out about the affair when the tulips bloom and Kyoko's notes fall off the petals.

Antoine is banished from the bedroom by a furious Christine and eventually moves out to a hotel, while his wife makes a life for herself and the baby. However, Antoine keeps in touch with Christine, who still worries about his well-being. Antoine grows bored with Kyoko, which she seemingly does not notice. Unable to be with Christine either, Antoine decides to have sex with a prostitute. Afterwards, he runs into Christine's father in the brothel. The latter remains unashamed, seeing this as a normal part of a married man's life. During dinner at a restaurant, Antoine constantly neglects Kyoko, taking multiple trips to the telephone booth to call Christine and express his dissatisfaction with Kyoko. After the last call, Antoine returns to the table to find that Kyoko is gone, leaving him a note that reads "Drop dead".

One year later, Antoine and Christine are back together, raising Alphonse in their apartment. Their neighbours, an older married couple, believe that Antoine and Christine are now finally, truly in love with each other.

== Cast ==
- Jean-Pierre Léaud as Antoine Doinel
- Claude Jade as Christine Doinel
- Hiroko Berghauer (credited as Mademoiselle Hiroko) as Kyoko
- Barbara Laage as Monique, the secretary
- Danièle Girard as Ginette, a waitress
- Daniel Ceccaldi as Lucien Darbon, Christine's father
- Claire Duhamel as Madame Darbon, Christine's mother
- Daniel Boulanger as Ténor
- Silvana Blasi as Silvana, Ténor's wife
- Pierre Maguelon as Cérasin's friend
- Jacques Jouanneau as Césarin
- Claude Véga as the Strangler
- Jacques Rispal as Monsieur Desbois
- Jacques Robiolles as Jacques
- Pierre Fabre as the office Romeo
- Christian de Tillière as Baumel
- Billy Kearns as Mr. Max
- Guy Piérauld as the TV repairman
- Marie Dedieu as Marie, a prostitute
- Marie Irakane as Mrs. Martin, a concierge
- Philippe Léotard as a drunkard (uncredited)
- Iska Khan as Kyoko's father (uncredited)
- Jacques Cottin as Monsieur Hulot (uncredited)

== Reception ==
=== Critical response ===
John Simon wrote that Bed and Board "gives no offense, and no enlightenment".

=== Accolades ===
Year	Award ceremony	Category	Nominee	Result
1971	NBR Awards	Top Foreign Language Films	Bed and Board	Won
