= François Truffaut =

French filmmaker (1932–1984)

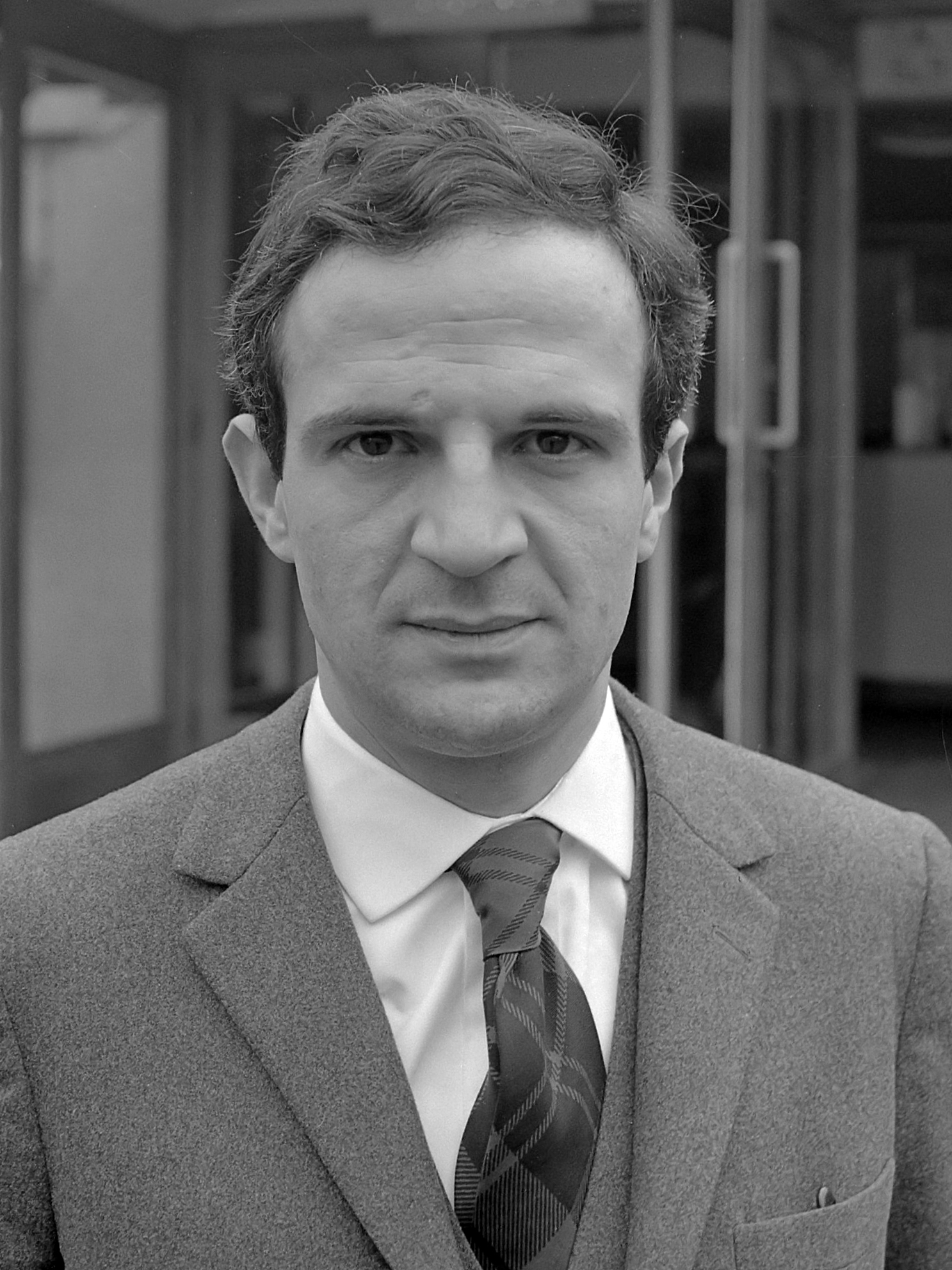
- Truffaut in 1965
- Born: 6 February 1932; Paris, France
- Died: 21 October 1984 (aged 52); Neuilly-sur-Seine, France
- Resting place: Montmartre Cemetery, France
- Occupations: Film director; screenwriter; actor; critic
- Years active: 1955–1984
- Spouse: Madeleine Morgenstern (m. 1957; div. 1965)
- Partners: Claude Jade (1968); Fanny Ardant (1981–1984)
- Children: 3
- Relatives: Ignace Morgenstern (father-in-law)

François Roland Truffaut (UK: /ˈtruːfoʊ, ˈtrʊ-/ TROO-foh, TRUU-, US: /truːˈfoʊ/ troo-FOH; French: [fʁɑ̃swa ʁɔlɑ̃ tʁyfo]; 6 February 1932 – 21 October 1984) was a French filmmaker, actor, and critic. Widely regarded as one of the founders of the French New Wave, he came under the tutelage of film critic André Bazin as a young man and was hired to write for the latter's Cahiers du Cinéma, where Truffaut became a proponent of the auteur theory, which posits that a film's director is its true author.

The 400 Blows (1959), starring Jean-Pierre Léaud as Truffaut's alter ego Antoine Doinel, was a defining film of the New Wave. Truffaut's films Stolen Kisses (1968), Bed and Board (1970) and Love on the Run (1979) continued to chronicle the story of the couple Antoine and Christine (Claude Jade). Truffaut contributed to another significant milestone of the movement with his work on Breathless (1960), a film directed by his Cahiers colleague Jean-Luc Godard.

Truffaut's other notable films include Shoot the Piano Player (1960), Jules and Jim (1962), The Soft Skin (1964), Two English Girls (1971) and The Last Metro (1980). Truffaut's Day for Night (1973) earned him the BAFTA Award for Best Film and the Academy Award for Best Foreign Language Film. He played the doctor in The Wild Child (1970), the director of the film-within-the-film in Day For Night and the scientist in Steven Spielberg's Close Encounters of the Third Kind (1977). He starred in The Green Room (1978), based on Henry James's "The Altar of the Dead". He wrote Hitchcock/Truffaut (1966), a book-length interview with his hero Alfred Hitchcock which tied for second on Sight and Sound's list of the greatest books on film. Truffaut paid homage to Hitchcock in The Bride Wore Black (1968), Mississippi Mermaid (1969) and his last film, Confidentially Yours (1983).

Truffaut was married from 1957 until 1964 to Madeleine Morgenstern. In 1968, he became engaged to leading actress Claude Jade from three of his films, and lived together with Fanny Ardant, actress in his two last films, until his death. David Thomson writes that "for many people who love film Truffaut will always seem like the most accessible and engaging crest of the New Wave".

== Early life ==
Truffaut was born in Paris on 6 February 1932. His mother was Janine de Montferrand. His mother's future husband, Roland Truffaut, accepted him as an adopted son and gave him his surname. He was passed around to live with various nannies and his grandmother for a number of years. His grandmother instilled in him her love of books and music. He lived with her until her death, when Truffaut was eight years old. It was only after her death that he lived with his parents. Truffaut's biological father's identity is unknown, but a private detective agency in 1968 revealed that its inquiry into the matter led to a Roland Levy, a Jewish dentist from Bayonne. Truffaut's mother's family disputed the finding but Truffaut believed and embraced it.

Truffaut often stayed with friends and tried to be out of the house as much as possible. He knew Robert Lachenay from childhood, and they were lifelong best friends. Lachenay was the inspiration for the character René Bigey in The 400 Blows and worked as an assistant on some of Truffaut's films. Cinema offered Truffaut the greatest escape from an unsatisfying home life. He was eight years old when he saw his first movie, Abel Gance's Paradis Perdu (Paradise Lost, 1939), beginning his obsession. He frequently skipped school and sneaked into theaters because he lacked the money for admission. At age eleven, he read Émile Zola's Thérèse Raquin (1868), which inspired him to become a novelist. After being expelled from several schools, at age 14 he decided to become self-taught. Two of his academic goals were to watch three movies a day and read three books a week.

"What switched me to films was the flood of American pictures into Paris after the Liberation". Truffaut frequented Henri Langlois's Cinémathèque Française, where he was exposed to countless foreign films, becoming familiar with American cinema and directors such as John Ford, Howard Hawks and Nicholas Ray, as well as British director Alfred Hitchcock.

== Career ==
=== André Bazin ===
After starting his own film club in 1948, Truffaut met André Bazin, who had a great effect on his professional and personal life. Bazin was a critic and the head of another film society at the time. He became a personal friend of Truffaut's and helped him out of various financial and criminal situations during his formative years.

Truffaut joined the French Army in 1950, aged 18, but spent the next two years trying to escape. He was arrested for attempting to desert the army and incarcerated in military prison. Bazin used his political contacts to get Truffaut released and set him up with a job at his new film magazine, Cahiers du Cinéma.

=== Cahiers du Cinéma ===
Over the next few years, Truffaut became a critic (and later editor) at Cahiers, where he became notorious for his brutal, unforgiving reviews. He was called "The Gravedigger of French Cinema" and was the only French critic not invited to the 1958 Cannes Film Festival. He supported Bazin in developing one of the most influential theories of cinema, the auteur theory.

In 1954, Truffaut wrote an article in Cahiers du cinéma, "Une Certaine Tendance du Cinéma Français" ("A Certain Trend of French Cinema"), in which he attacked the state of French films, lambasting certain screenwriters and producers, and listing eight directors he considered incapable of devising the kinds of "vile" and "grotesque" characters and storylines he called characteristic of the mainstream French film industry: Jean Renoir, Robert Bresson, Jean Cocteau, Jacques Becker, Abel Gance, Max Ophuls, Jacques Tati and Roger Leenhardt. The article caused a storm of controversy and landed Truffaut an offer to write for the nationally circulated, more widely read cultural weekly Arts-Lettres-Spectacles. Truffaut wrote more than 500 film articles for that publication over the next four years.

Truffaut later devised the auteur theory, according to which the director was the "author" of his work and great directors such as Renoir or Hitchcock have distinct styles and themes that permeate their films. Although his theory was not widely accepted then, it gained some support in the 1960s from American critic Andrew Sarris. In 1966, Truffaut published his book-length interview with Hitchcock, Hitchcock/Truffaut.

=== Short films ===
After having been a critic, Truffaut decided to make films. He began with the short film Une Visite (1955) and followed it with Les Mistons (1957).

=== The 400 Blows ===
After seeing Orson Welles's Touch of Evil at the Expo 58, Truffaut made his directorial debut with The 400 Blows (1959), which received considerable critical and commercial acclaim. He won the Best Director award at the 1959 Cannes Film Festival. The film follows the character of Antoine Doinel through his perilous misadventures in school, an unhappy home life and later reform school. It is highly autobiographical. Both Truffaut and Doinel were only children of loveless marriages; they both committed petty crimes of theft and truancy from the military. Truffaut cast Jean-Pierre Léaud as Doinel. Léaud was seen as an ordinary boy of 14 who auditioned for the role after seeing a flyer, but interviews after the film's release (one is included on the Criterion DVD of the film) reveal Léaud's natural sophistication and an instinctive understanding of acting for the camera. Léaud and Truffaut collaborated on several films over the years. Their most noteworthy collaboration was the continuation of Doinel's story in a series of films called "The Antoine Doinel Cycle".

The primary focus of The 400 Blows is Doinel's life. The film follows him through his troubled adolescence. He is caught in between an unstable parental relationship and an isolated youth. From birth Truffaut was thrown into a troublesome situation. As he was born out of wedlock, his birth had to remain a secret because of the stigma of illegitimacy. He was registered as "a child born to an unknown father" in hospital records and looked after by a nurse for an extended period of time. His mother eventually married and her husband gave François his surname, Truffaut.

The 400 Blows marked the beginning of the French New Wave movement, led by such directors as Jean-Luc Godard, Claude Chabrol and Jacques Rivette. The New Wave dealt with a self-conscious rejection of traditional cinema structure, a topic on which Truffaut had been writing for years. Thomson writes that The 400 Blows "securely tied the new films to Renoir, Vigo, and the French tradition of location shooting, flowing camera, and offhand lyricism." Time included it on its list of the one hundred greatest films since the magazine's founding, with Richard Schickel writing: "Partly autobiographical, both realistic and gently experimental in manner, it tells the story of a mischievous boy flirting with full-scale delinquency. TIME thought the director 'impressively objective and mature.' It did not mention his uncanny ability to achieve cinematic elegance on a shoestring. Or, more important, his ability to enlist sympathy for his protagonist without unduly sentimentalizing him." Truffaut provided the premise for another landmark New Wave film, Godard's Breathless (1960).

=== Shoot the Piano Player ===
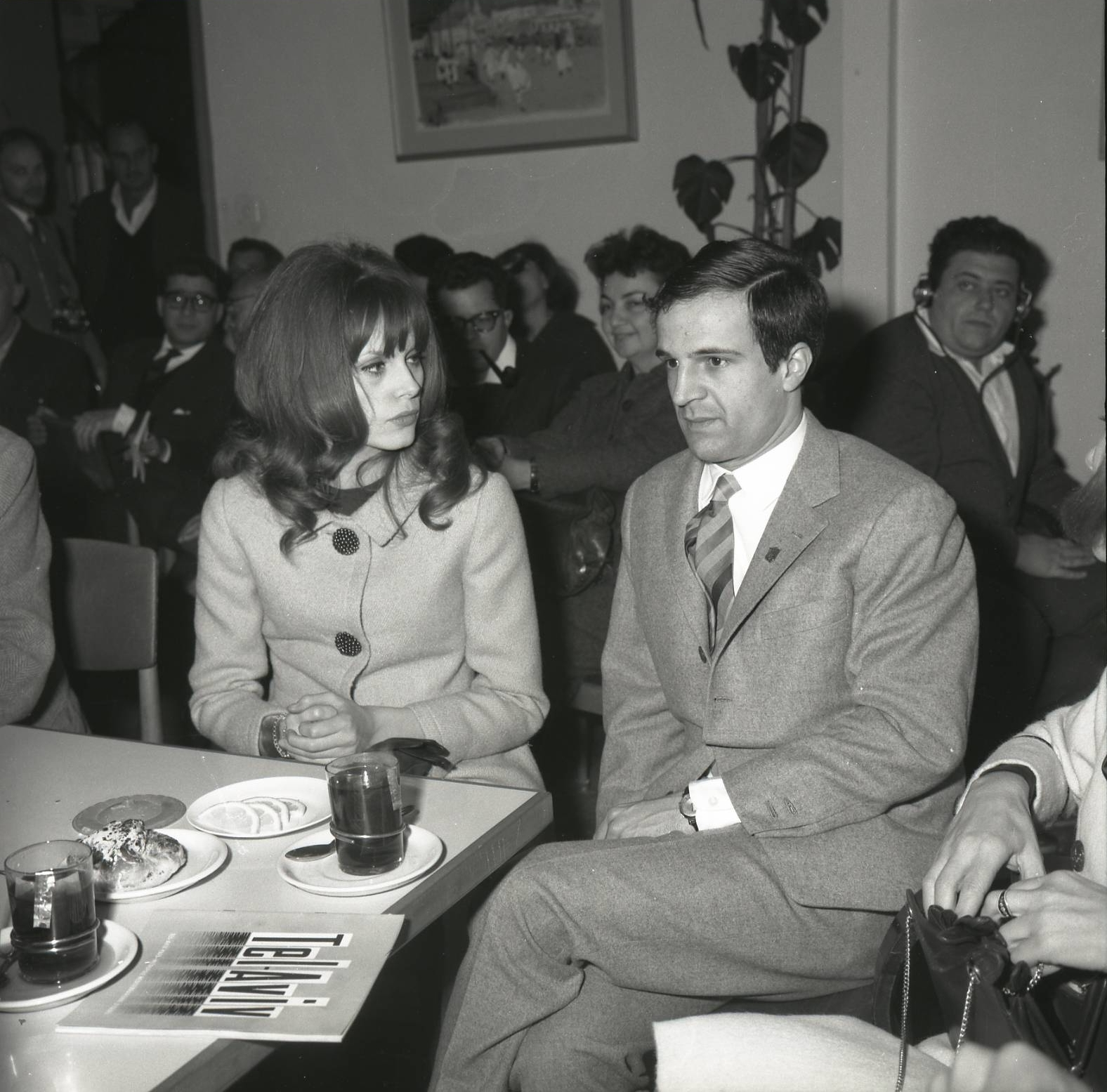
Truffaut and actress Françoise Dorléac during a visit to Israel, 1963

Following the success of The 400 Blows, Truffaut featured disjunctive editing and seemingly random voiceovers in his next film, Shoot the Piano Player (1960), starring Charles Aznavour. Truffaut has said that in the middle of filming, he realized that he hated gangsters. But since gangsters were a main part of the story, he toned up the comical aspect of the characters and made the movie more to his liking.

While Shoot the Piano Player was much appreciated by critics, it performed poorly at the box office. Truffaut never again experimented as heavily. Referring to the film's digressions, Thomson calls it "the kind of film Laurence Sterne might have made".

=== Jules and Jim and The Soft Skin ===
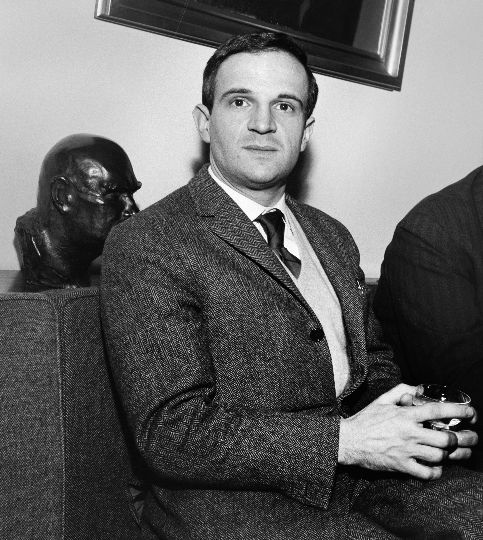
Truffaut during his visit to Helsinki, Finland on 21 December 1964

Truffaut directed Jules and Jim (1962), the story of a ménage à trois starring Oskar Werner, Henri Serre and Jeanne Moreau. Pauline Kael defended the film against charges of immorality: "Jules and Jim is not only one of the most beautiful films ever made, and the greatest motion picture of recent years, it is also, viewed as a work of art, exquisitely and impeccably moral. Truffaut does not use the screen for messages or special pleading or to sell sex for money; he uses the film medium to express his love and knowledge of life as completely as he can."

Thomson writes that "The speed of farce chasing pathos was very influential, not least on the writers of Bonnie and Clyde. In Jules et Jim, Truffaut formed his most fruitful collaboration, with the novelist Henri-Pierre Roché, author of Les Deux Anglaises and of a situation dear to Truffaut—the passionate triangle in which three people are trapped, all in love with all, all reluctant to hurt the others." In 1963, Truffaut was approached to direct Bonnie and Clyde, with a treatment written by Esquire journalists David Newman and Robert Benton intended to introduce the French New Wave to Hollywood. Although he was interested enough to help in script development, Truffaut ultimately declined, but not before interesting Godard and American actor and would-be producer Warren Beatty, who proceeded with the film with director Arthur Penn.

Truffaut's fourth film, The Soft Skin (1964), was not acclaimed on its release.

=== Fahrenheit 451 ===
Truffaut's first non-French film was a 1966 adaptation of Ray Bradbury's classic science fiction novel Fahrenheit 451, showcasing Truffaut's love of books. His only English-speaking film, made on location in England, was a great challenge for Truffaut, because he barely spoke English himself. Shot by cinematographer Nicolas Roeg, it was Truffaut's first film in color. The larger-scale production was difficult for Truffaut, as he had only worked only with small crews and budgets. The shoot was also strained by a conflict with Oskar Werner, who was unhappy with his character and stormed off set, leaving Truffaut to shoot scenes using a body double shot from behind. The film was a commercial failure, and Truffaut never worked outside France again. The film's cult standing has steadily grown, although some critics remain dubious of it as an adaptation. A 2014 consideration of the film by Charles Silver praises it.

=== Thrillers and Stolen Kisses ===
Stolen Kisses (1968) was a continuation of the Antoine Doinel Cycle starring Claude Jade as Antoine's fiancée and later wife Christine Darbon. During its filming Truffaut fell in love with Jade and was briefly engaged to her. It was a big hit on the international art circuit. A short time later, Jade made her Hollywood debut in Hitchcock's Topaz.

Truffaut worked on projects with varied subjects. The Bride Wore Black (1968), a brutal tale of revenge, is a stylish homage to the films of Hitchcock, once again starring Moreau. Mississippi Mermaid (1969), with Catherine Deneuve and Jean-Paul Belmondo, is an identity-bending romantic thriller. Both films are based on novels by Cornell Woolrich.

The Wild Child (1970) included Truffaut's acting debut in the lead role of 18th-century physician Jean Marc Gaspard Itard, who treated the feral child Victor of Aveyron.

=== Doinel marries Christine ===
Bed and Board (1970) was another Antoine Doinel film, also with Jade, now Léaud's on-screen-wife.

Two English Girls (1971), a story of "Proust and the Brontë sisters" is the female reflection of the love story in "Jules et Jim". It is based on a story by Roché, who wrote Jules and Jim, about a man who falls equally in love with two sisters, and their love affair over a period of years.

A Gorgeous Girl Like Me (1972) was a screwball comedy.

=== Day for Night ===
Day for Night won Truffaut an Academy Award for Best Foreign Language Film. It is probably his most reflective work, telling the story of a film crew trying to finish a film while dealing with the personal and professional problems that accompany making a movie. Truffaut plays the director of the film-within-the film, Meet Pamela. Day For Night features scenes from his previous films. It is considered his best film since his early work. Thomson notes "the pleasure with all cinema's tricks and the way it makes them clear to a lay audience." Time magazine placed it on its list of 100 Best Films of the Century, with Schickel writing: "Truffaut perfectly captures the romance and hysteria, the guiding obsessions, the lunatic distractions and the desperate improvisations of a company shooting a film, which may not be as great as they delude themselves into thinking it is."

In 1975, Truffaut gained more notoriety with The Story of Adèle H.; Isabelle Adjani in the title role earned a nomination for an Academy Award for Best Actress. Small Change (1976) was nominated for the Golden Globe Award for Best Foreign Language Film.

=== Final films ===
The Man Who Loved Women (1977), a romantic drama, was a minor hit.

Truffaut appeared in Steven Spielberg's Close Encounters of the Third Kind (1977) as scientist Claude Lacombe. He also starred in his own The Green Room (1978), based on Henry James's "The Altar of the Dead". It was a box-office flop, so he made Love on the Run (1979) starring Léaud and Jade as the final movie of the Doinel Cycle.

One of Truffaut's final films gave him an international revival. The Last Metro (1980) garnered 12 César Award nominations and 10 wins, including Best Director.

Truffaut's last film was black and white, making it a bookend to his career: Confidentially Yours (1983), Truffaut's homage to Hitchcock. It touches on numerous Hitchcockian themes such as private guilt vis-à-vis public innocence, a woman investigating a murder, and anonymous locations.

== Legacy ==
Many filmmakers admire Truffaut, and homages to his work have appeared in films such as Almost Famous, Face and The Diving Bell and the Butterfly and in Haruki Murakami's novel Kafka on the Shore. In conversation with Michael Ondaatje, film editor Walter Murch mentions the influence Truffaut had on him as a young man, saying he was "electrified" by the freeze-frame at the end of The 400 Blows, and that Godard's Breathless and Truffaut's Shoot the Piano Player reinforced the idea that he could make films. In the estimation of the historian Tony Judt, "it was the incomparable François Truffaut who would come to incarnate the style and impact of the New Wave...Truffaut was not only the main theorist behind the revolution in French cinema, he was also by far its most consistently successful practitioner". Known as a lifelong cinephile, Truffaut once (according to the 1993 documentary film François Truffaut: Stolen Portraits) threw a hitchhiker out of his car after learning that he did not like films.

Roger Ebert included The 400 Blows in his canon of Great Movies, writing of Truffaut:

one of his most curious, haunting films is The Green Room (1978), based on the Henry James story "The Altar of the Dead", about a man and a woman who share a passion for remembering their dead loved ones. Jonathan Rosenbaum, who thinks The Green Room may be Truffaut's best film, told me he thinks of it as the director's homage to the auteur theory. That theory, created by Bazin and his disciples (Truffaut, Godard, Resnais, Chabrol, Rohmer, Malle), declared that the director was the true author of a film—not the studio, the screenwriter, the star, the genre. If the figures in the green room stand for the great directors of the past, perhaps there is a shrine there now to Truffaut. One likes to think of the ghost of Antoine Doinel lighting a candle before it.

== Commentary on other filmmakers ==
In his book The Film in My Life Truffaut wrote "I demand that a film express either the joy of making cinema or the agony of making cinema."

Truffaut expressed his admiration for filmmakers such as Luis Buñuel, Ingmar Bergman, Robert Bresson, Roberto Rossellini and Alfred Hitchcock. He wrote Hitchcock/Truffaut, a book about Hitchcock, based on a lengthy series of interviews.

Of Jean Renoir, he said: "I think Renoir is the only filmmaker who's practically infallible, who has never made a mistake on film. And I think if he never made mistakes, it's because he always found solutions based on simplicity—human solutions. He's one film director who never pretended. He never tried to have a style, and if you know his work—which is very comprehensive, since he dealt with all sorts of subjects—when you get stuck, especially as a young filmmaker, you can think of how Renoir would have handled the situation, and you generally find a solution". Truffaut named his production company "Les Films du Carrosse" after Renoir's The Golden Coach (La Carrosse d'Or).

Truffaut called German filmmaker Werner Herzog "the most important film director alive."

Truffaut and Jean-Luc Godard, his colleague from Les Cahiers du Cinéma, worked together closely during their start as film directors although they had different working methods. Tensions came to the surface after May 68: Godard wanted a more political, specifically Marxist cinema, Truffaut was critical of creating films for primarily political purposes. In 1973, Godard wrote Truffaut a lengthy and raucous private letter peppered with accusations and insinuations, several times stating that as a filmmaker "you're a liar" and that his latest film (Day for Night) had been unsatisfying, lying and evasive: "You're a liar, because the scene between you and Jacqueline Bisset last week at Francis [a Paris restaurant] isn't included in your movie, and one also can't help wondering why the director is the only guy who isn't sleeping around in Day for Night" (Truffaut directed the film, wrote it and played the role of the director). Godard also implied that Truffaut had gone commercial and easy.

Truffaut replied with an angry 20-page letter in which he accused Godard of being a radical-chic hypocrite, a man who believed everyone to be "equal" in theory only. "The Ursula Andress of militancy—like Brando—a piece of shit on a pedestal." Godard later tried to reconcile with Truffaut, but they never spoke to or saw each other again. After Truffaut's death, Godard wrote the introduction to a generous selection of his correspondence, and included his own 1973 letter. He also offered a long tribute in his film Histoire(s) du cinéma.

Truffaut was philosophically opposed to attempts to portray anti-war themes through cinema, famously stating that "there is no such thing as an anti-war film" due to the medium's inherent glorification of such subjects, no matter how they are portrayed.

== Personal life ==
Truffaut was married to Madeleine Morgenstern from 1957 to 1965, and they had two daughters.

In 1968, Truffaut was engaged to actress Claude Jade. He and Fanny Ardant lived together from 1981 to 1984 and had a daughter.

He had a "fetishistic collection of Eiffel Towers".

Truffaut was an atheist, but had great respect for the Catholic Church and requested a Requiem Mass for his funeral.

== Death ==
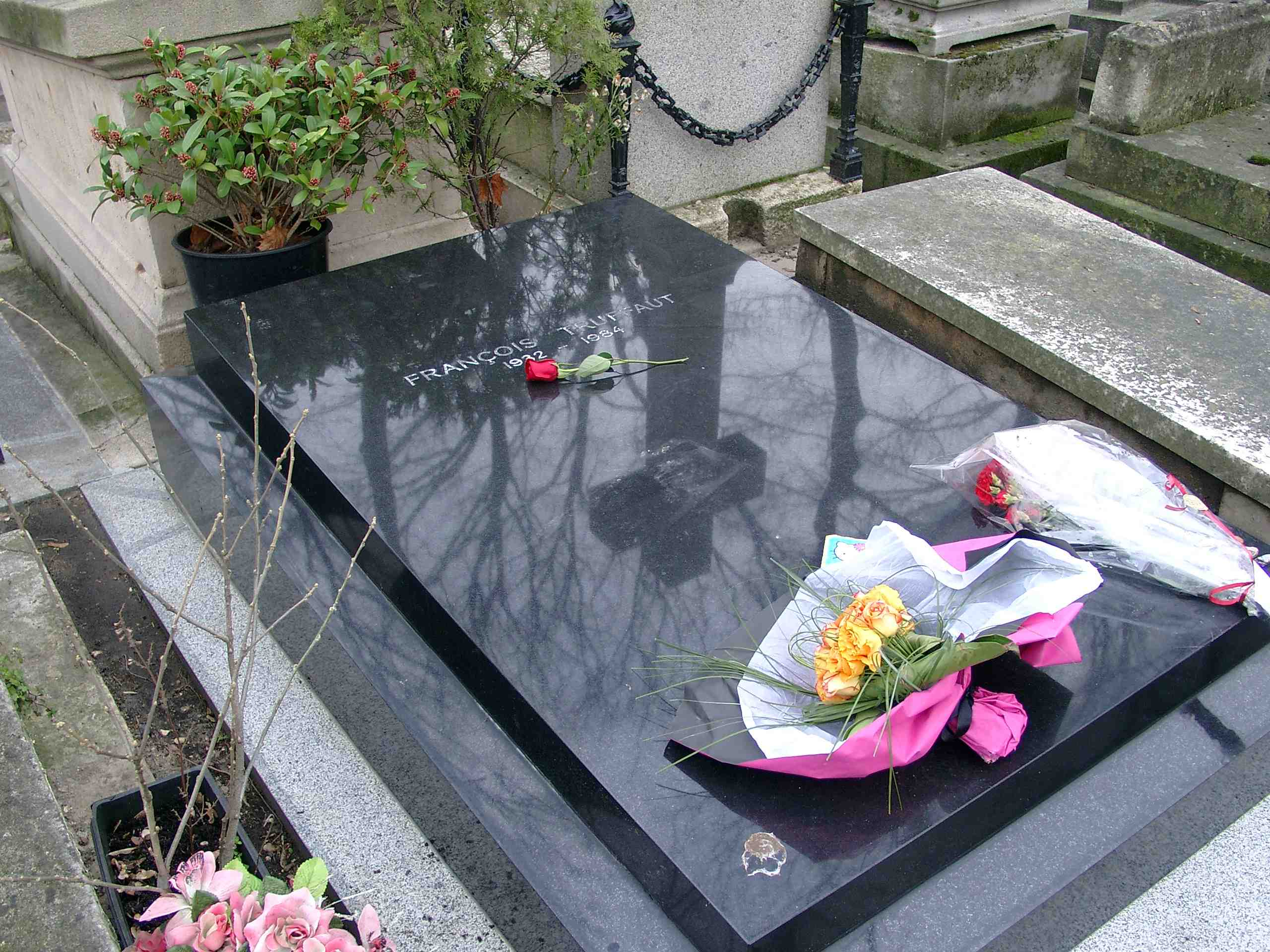
Truffaut's grave in Montmartre Cemetery, Paris

In July 1983, following his first stroke and being diagnosed with a brain tumour, Truffaut rented France Gall's and Michel Berger's house outside Honfleur, Normandy. He was expected to attend his friend Miloš Forman's Amadeus premiere when he died of brain cancer on 21 October 1984, aged 52, at the American Hospital of Paris in Neuilly-sur-Seine in France.

At the time of his death, he was said to have numerous further films in preparation. He is buried in Montmartre Cemetery.

== Filmography ==
=== Short film ===
Year	Title	Director	Writer	Notes
1955	Une Visite	Yes	Yes	
1957	Les Mistons	Yes	Uncredited	
1961	A Story of Water	Yes	Yes	Co-directed with Jean-Luc Godard
1962	Antoine and Colette	Yes	Yes	Segment from Love at Twenty

=== Feature film ===
Year	Title	Director	Writer	Producer	Notes
1959	The 400 Blows	Yes	Yes	Uncredited	
1960	Breathless	No	Yes	No	
1960	Shoot the Piano Player	Yes	Yes	No	
1960	The Army Game	Yes	Yes	Yes	Co-directed with Claude de Givray
1962	Jules and Jim	Yes	Yes	Uncredited	
1964	The Soft Skin	Yes	Yes	No	
1966	Fahrenheit 451	Yes	Yes	No	English debut
1968	The Bride Wore Black	Yes	Yes	No	
1968	Stolen Kisses	Yes	Yes	Uncredited	
1969	Mississippi Mermaid	Yes	Yes	No	
1970	The Wild Child	Yes	Yes	No	
1970	Bed and Board	Yes	Yes	Uncredited	
1971	Two English Girls	Yes	Yes	No	
1972	A Gorgeous Girl Like Me	Yes	Yes	No	based on Henry Farrell's novel Such a Gorgeous Kid Like Me
1973	Day for Night	Yes	Yes	No	
1975	The Story of Adèle H.	Yes	Yes	No	
1976	Small Change	Yes	Yes	No	
1977	The Man Who Loved Women	Yes	Yes	Uncredited	
1978	The Green Room	Yes	Yes	Yes	
1979	Love on the Run	Yes	Yes	Yes	
1980	The Last Metro	Yes	Yes	Uncredited	
1981	The Woman Next Door	Yes	Yes	Yes	
1983	Confidentially Yours	Yes	Yes	Yes	
1988	The Little Thief	No	Yes	No	Posthumous release

=== TV writer (Posthumous releases) ===
Year	Title	Notes
1995	Belle Époque	Miniseries
2019–2022	Lire	3 episodes

=== Acting roles ===
Year	Title	Role	Notes
1956	Fool's Mate	Party guest	Uncredited
1956	La sonate à Kreutzer		
1959	The 400 Blows	Man in Funfair	Uncredited
1963	À tout prendre	Himself	Uncredited
1964	The Soft Skin	Petrol pump attendant (Voice)	Uncredited
1970	The Wild Child	Dr. Jean Itard	
1970	Bed and Board	Newspaper vendor	Voice, Uncredited
1971	Two English Girls	Récitant / Narrator	Voice, Uncredited
1972	Such a Gorgeous Kid Like Me	Un journaliste	Voice, Uncredited
1973	Day for Night	Ferrand, the film director	
1975	The Story of Adèle H.	Officer	Uncredited
1976	Small Change	Martine's Father	Uncredited
1977	The Man Who Loved Women	Man at Funeral	Uncredited
1977	Close Encounters of the Third Kind	Claude Lacombe	
1978	The Green Room	Julien Davenne	Lead role
1981	The Woman Next Door	Cameo	Uncredited

== Awards and nominations ==
Academy Awards

Year	Title	Category	Result	Ref.
1959	The 400 Blows	Best Original Screenplay	Nominated	
1968	Stolen Kisses	Best Foreign Language Film	Nominated	
1973	Day for Night	Best Foreign Language Film	Won	
1973	Day for Night	Best Director	Nominated	
1973	Day for Night	Best Original Screenplay	Nominated	
1980	The Last Metro	Best Foreign Language Film	Nominated	

BAFTA Awards

Year	Title	Category	Result
1973	Day for Night	Best Film	Won
1973	Day for Night	Best Direction	Won
1977	Close Encounters of the Third Kind	Best Actor in a Supporting Role	Nominated

Berlin International Film Festival

Year	Title	Category	Result	Ref.
1976	Small Change	Golden Bear	Nominated	
1977	The Man Who Loved Women	Golden Bear	Nominated	
1979	Love on the Run	Golden Bear	Nominated	

Cannes Film Festival

Year	Title	Category	Result
1959	The 400 Blows	Palme d'Or	Nominated
1959	The 400 Blows	Best Director	Won
1964	The Soft Skin	Palme d'Or	Nominated

César Awards

Year	Title	Category	Result
1975	The Story of Adèle H.	Best Director	Nominated
1980	The Last Metro	Best Film	Won
1980	The Last Metro	Best Director	Won
1980	The Last Metro	Best Screenplay, Dialogue or Adaptation	Won
1983	Confidentially Yours	Best Director	Nominated

Mar del Plata International Film Festival

Year	Title	Category	Result
1962	Jules and Jim	Best Film	Nominated
1962	Jules and Jim	Best Director	Won

Venice International Film Festival

Year	Title	Category	Result
1966	Fahrenheit 451	Golden Lion	Nominated

Accolades for Truffaut's directed features
Year	Title	Academy Awards		BAFTA Film Awards		Golden Globes Awards		César Awards	
Year	Title	Nominations	Wins	Nominations	Wins	Nominations	Wins	Nominations	Wins
1959	The 400 Blows	1		2					
1962	Jules and Jim			2					
1966	Fahrenheit 451			1					
1968	The Bride Wore Black					1			
1968	Stolen Kisses	1				1			
1973	Day for Night	4	1	3	3	2			
1975	The Story of Adele H.	1						3	
1976	Small Change					1			
1977	The Man Who Loved Women							3	
1978	The Green Room							1	
1979	Love on the Run							1	1
1980	The Last Metro	1				1		12	10
1981	The Woman Next Door							2	
1983	Confidentially Yours			1				2	
Total		8	1	9	3	6		24	11

== Bibliography ==
- Les 400 Coups (1960) with M. Moussy (English translation: The 400 Blows)
- Le Cinéma selon Alfred Hitchcock (1967, second edition 1983) (English translation: Hitchcock and Hitchcock/Truffaut with the collaboration of Helen G. Scott)
- Les Aventures d'Antoine Doinel (1970) (English translation: Adventures of Antoine Doinel; translated by Helen G. Scott)
- Jules et Jim (film script) (1971) (English translation: Jules and Jim; translated by Nicholas Fry)
- La Nuit américaine et le Journal de Fahrenheit 451 (1974)
- Le Plaisir des yeux (1975)
- L'Argent de poche (1976) (English title: Small Change: A Film Novel; translated by Anselm Hollo)
- L'Homme qui aimait les femmes (1977)
- Les Films de ma vie (1981) (English translation: The Films in My Life, translated by Leonard Mayhew)
- Correspondance (1988) (English translation: Correspondence, 1945–1984; translated by Gilbert Adair, released posthumously)
- Le Cinéma selon François Truffaut (1988) edited by Anne Gillain (released posthumously)
- Belle époque (1996) with Jean Gruault (released posthumously)

== See also ==
- List of atheists in film, radio, television and theater
- François Truffaut Award
- Paris Belongs to Us
- Two in the Wave, a 2010 documentary film about Truffaut's relationship with Jean-Luc Godard
- La Cinémathèque Française will offer a full retrospective and an exhibition of François Truffaut's work in 2014 / 2015
