= Jean-Claude Dauphin =

French actor

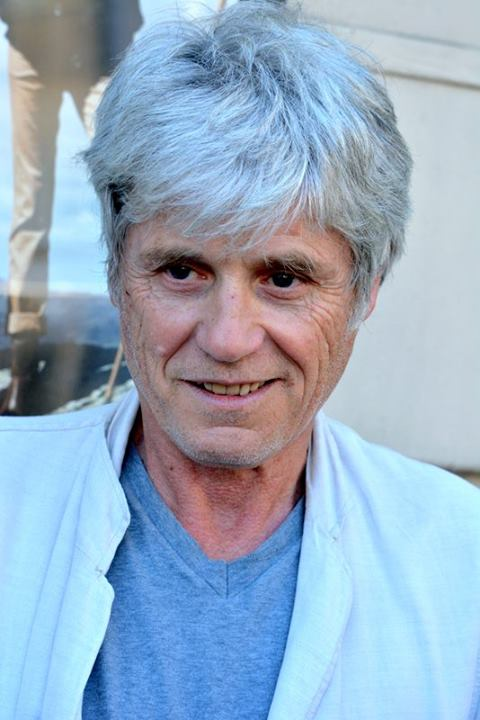
- Dauphin in 2013
- Born: Jean-Claude Legrand; March 16, 1948 (age 77); Boulogne-Billancourt, France
- Occupation: Actor
- Parents: Claude Dauphin (father); Maria Mauban (mother)
- Relatives: Jean Nohain (uncle); James Newman (nephew); Griffin Newman (nephew); Romilly Newman (niece)

Jean-Claude Dauphin (né Legrand; born 16 March 1948) is a French actor who is primarily known for national movie productions in France. He is an uncle to American actors Griffin Newman and James Newman as well as to chef Romilly Newman.

== Biography ==
He is the son of actor Claude Dauphin and actress Maria Mauban, the grandson of the poet Maurice Étienne Legrand and nephew host Jean Nohain, his father's brother.

At Lycée Paul-Valéry in Paris, he studied in the class of Latinist Bernard Mortureux, a specialist in Seneca.

His debut, in 1968, in Adolphe ou l'Âge tendre (Adolphe or the tender Age), directed by Bernard Toublanc-Michel, made him famo

In 1969, he plays Claude Jade's fiancé in The Witness. At the time, Claude Jade and Jean-Claude Dauphin were a couple. Jade later wrote in her autobiography Baisers envolés: "He was charming, funny, intelligent, and I was not long in going out with him. With our fair complexion and fine features, we could have played a brother and a sister."

Gérard Blain hired him in 1970 for The Friends, a gay romance which won the Golden Leopard at the Locarno International Film Festival, and in 1972 Bernard Paul gave him the lead role alongside Dominique Labourier in Beau Masque (Handsome Face). He plays alongside Annie Girardot and Philippe Noiret in Edouard Molinaro's La Mandarine, and alongside Isabelle Adjani in the television series Le Secret des Flamands.

Other films in the 1970s: Le Hasard et la Violence, Les Suspects, Hugues-le-loup, Dracula and Son...

In 1980, he played Ulysses alongside Nicole Jamet in The Inconnue of Arras by Raymond Rouleau. He is also the voice-over or the reciter of many documentaries of French television.

In 1981, he was Ricky in Choice of Arms by Alain Corneau and participated, in 1984, in Souvenirs, Souvenirs. One of his most important roles is that of Clovis, the hero of Adieu la vie, directed by Maurice Dugowson in 1986.

In 1987, he played with Guy Marchand and Caroline Cellier in Charlie Dingo by Gilles Béhat, and with Juliette Binoche in The Unbearable Lightness of Being.

One of his latest film hits is his role in Benoît Jacquot's The School of Flesh (1998) with Isabelle Huppert. Later movies are including Léa (2011).

Since the 1990 he worked more for television where he met again his former fiancée Claude Jade in Sentiments mortels, an episode of TV series Navarro.

== Filmography ==
Year	Title	Role	Notes
1968	Adolphe ou l'Âge tendre	Henri Rebecque / Adolphe	
1969	The Witness	Thomas	
1971	The Friends	Nicolas	
1972	Sweet Deception	Alain / Sister	
1972	What a Flash!		
1972	Beau Masque	Philippe	
1974	Le Hasard et la Violence	Gilbert Morgan	
1974	The Suspects	Solnes	
1976	Dracula and Son	Cristéa	
1977	Barry of the Great St. Bernard	Martin	TV movie
1977	La fille d'Amérique	Jérôme	
1977	Dernière sortie avant Roissy	Jean-Yves, le sous-directeur du Prisunic	
1981	Choice of Arms	Ricky	
1983	Sarah	Senechal	
1983	Une jeunesse	Vietti	
1984	Souvenirs, Souvenirs	Jean-Michel	
1985	Spécial police	Durand	
1985	L'amour propre ne le reste jamais très longtemps	Gautier	
1986	Yiddish Connection	Toussaint	
1986	Nuit d'ivresse	Le deuxième flic / 2nd Policeman	
1986	Série noire	Antoine / Clovis	2 episodes
1987	Charlie Dingo	Jupin	
1988	The Unbearable Lightness of Being	Swiss editor	
1991	Netchaïev est de retour	Philippe Martel	
1998	The School of Flesh	Louis-Guy	
1999	Why Not Me?	Alain	
1999	Le sourire du clown	Vogel	
2000	Six-Pack	Fouquier	
2001	La tour Montparnasse infernale	Le commissaire	
2001	Les âmes câlines	Père de Claire et Emilie	
2007	The Second Wind	Jacques le notaire	
2008	LOL (Laughing Out Loud)	Le ministre	
2010	Streamfield, les carnets noirs	Corbin - 'le corbeau'	
2011	Léa	Pierre	
2011	The Monk	Narrateur	Voice
