= Marc Brandel =

English screenwriter and writer (1919–1994)

- Born: Marcus James Beresford; 28 March 1919; London, United Kingdom
- Died: 16 November 1994 (aged 75); Santa Monica, California, U.S.
- Occupation: Writer
- Spouses: Barbara Bingham Hale (m. 1950; div. 1955) Ruda Podemska (m. 1956; div. 1960)
- Children: 3

Marc Brandel (né Marcus James Beresford; 28 March 1919 – 16 November 1994) was an English writer who was primarily known for his work of plays, screenplays, and novels.

== Early life ==
Brandel was born Marcus James Beresford on 28 March 1919 in London, United Kingdom, the youngest of three sons, to John Davys Beresford (1873–1947), a writer originally from Castor, Northamptonshire, and his second wife Beatrice Auford Beresford (née Roskams; 1880–1975), from Bristol. His brothers were; John Tristram Beresford (born 1914) and Aden Noel Beresford (born 1917).

He was educated at "various schools in France, Switzerland, and England". After a year at St Catherine's College, Cambridge (1937–1938), he dropped out, and at the age of nineteen migrated to the United States, where he worked as a commercial sculptor until his first novel was published. At the time of the census of 1921, the family was living at White House, East Claydon, Buckinghamshire, with three servants living in and with two visitors, the illustrator Alan Odle and his wife the novelist Dorothy Richardson.

By using the unusual names Marcus and Tristram for his sons, J. D. Beresford appears to have claimed kinship with the Beresfords of Colerain and Waterford. An undated diary entry by the American artist Clifford Wright (1919–1999) claims that Brandel was taken to the U.S. by a secretary of Neville Chamberlain, stole $1,000 from him, and fled to Mexico.

== Career ==
For his first book, Rain Before Seven (1945), Brandel first used his pen-name. He went on to write ten more published novels and some 150 television plays. His stage play "The Man Who Let It Rain" was first presented in 1964 at the Theatre Royal, Covent Garden, and has been produced by several television play series. His screenplays included work for the BBC and ITV, and he was a screenwriter for many American and British television series, including The Alfred Hitchcock Hour, Kraft Television Theatre, The Three Investigators, Playhouse 90, Honey West, Barnaby Jones and Fantasy Island. He was also a journalist, writing for Atlantic Monthly, The New York Times, Colliers, and Cosmopolitan.

By the 1970s, writing for television was highly paid. In Britain, £1,000 was a typical payment for a script, about ten times as much as the advance for a novel.

Brandel's children’s book Mine of Lost Days was inspired by the Cappaghglass copper mine and illustrated by his friend John Verling.

His book The Lizards Tail was filmed as The Hand (1981).

In the 1980s, Brandel wrote some works of juvenile detective fiction in the Three Investigators series. His last novel, A Life of Her Own, is about a woman stalked by the father of her daughter.

== Personal life ==
In July 1947, giving two names, Marc Brandel and Marcus Beresford, Brandel was registered as an alien at San Antonio, Texas.

In 1948, at Yaddo, Brandel met Patricia Highsmith. They became engaged in May 1949, just before her first trip to Europe, but they broke it off in the fall of 1950.

In 1950, in Manhattan, as Marcus Beresford, he married Barbara Bingham Hale, daughter of Thomas Shaw Hale and Helen Bingham. They were divorced by 1955, when she married secondly Caleb Woodhull Davis.

In 1956, again as Beresford, he married secondly the actress Ruda Podemska, known as Ruda Michelle. In February 1958, in New York City, they had a daughter, Antonia Beresford. About 1960 her mother took her to live in Paris, where she added the name of Claude Dauphin, becoming Antonia Beresford Dauphin. She married the producer Peter Newman and is the mother of Romilly Newman and the actors Griffin and James Newman.

Brandel formally changed his name from Beresford to Brandel during the 1960s.

After living in the US for more than twenty years, in the early 1960s Brandel returned to Europe. In London in 1961 he met Naomi Glaister Primrose, who became his only long-term partner. They briefly set up home in Laurel Canyon, Los Angeles, then in 1962 bought a ruined house at Cappaghglass, Ballydehob, County Cork, restoring it and staying there until they separated in 1978, when Brandel returned to California. They had two daughters, Vanessa Tara (born 1967) and Shaena (born 1977). Tara Brandel is a choreographer living in Ireland, while Shaena Brandel is a circus performer and teacher now living in Somerset in the west of England.

In 1982, Naomi Brandel and her daughters moved to England. By 1989, Brandel was living in Santa Monica, California, and died there in 1994 by suicide.

He was the brother of Elisabeth Beresford, a writer of children's books and creator of the Wombles.

== Novels ==
- Rain Before Seven (New York: Harper & Brothers, 1945)
- The Rod and the Staff (New York: Harper & Brothers, 1947)
- The Barriers Between (New York: The Dial Press, 1949)
- The Choice (1950)
- The Time of the Fire (1954)
- The Man Who Liked Women (1972)
- Survivor (1976)
- The Lizard's Tail (1979)
- Murder in the Family (1985)
- A Life of Her Own (New York: Houghton Mifflin, 1985)

== For children ==
- The Mine of Lost Days (Lippincott Williams & Wilkins, 1974)
- The Mystery of the Kidnapped Whale (Random House, 1983, ISBN 9780394858418)
- The Mystery of the Two-Toed Pigeon (Random House, 1984)
- The Mystery of the Rogues’ Reunion (Random House, 1985)
- The 3 Investigators Crimebusters - An Ear for Danger (Random House, 1989)
