= Max Robertson =

Sports commentator and author (1915–2009)

- Born: William Maxwell Robertson; 28 August 1915; Dacca, Bengal Presidency, British India
- Died: 20 November 2009 (aged 94); Guernsey
- Occupations: Sports commentator, radio and television presenter, author
- Spouse(s): Nancy Suttor (divorced) Elisabeth Beresford (m. 1949; div. 1984)
- Children: 4

William Maxwell Robertson (28 August 1915 – 20 November 2009) was a sports commentator, radio and television presenter and author. He is best remembered for his forty years of tennis coverage on BBC Radio.

== Life and career ==
Robertson was born in Dacca, Bengal Presidency, to British parents. The family moved back to England when he was seven years old, he then attended Haileybury, the independent school. In 1935, he left Clare College, Cambridge, for an expedition to what is now Papua New Guinea. Afterwards he spent a few years in Sydney, where he worked as a schoolmaster. In 1937 Robertson gained his first job in broadcasting with the Australian Broadcasting Corporation. The first main tennis event he covered was the final of the Australian Open between Vivian McGrath and Jack Bromwich.

Robertson returned to England in 1939, and spent the war years in the army. He joined the BBC in 1946, covering not only tennis but also athletics, swimming, skiing and even sports he had no genuine interest in, like motor racing.

His style of commentary was much livelier than what BBC listeners were used to in the pre-war years. It gained him enough popularity for BBC staff to give him other assignments. In 1953 Robertson became the first regular host of the television series Panorama, which was not originally the heavyweight current affairs programme it became. He was also a commentator at major news events like the funeral of King George VI in 1952 and the coronation of Queen Elizabeth II a year later. From 1965 to 1977 he presented the television programme about antiques Going for a Song.

During his long career Robertson made the occasional blooper. In the early 1980s he was watching a men's doubles match at Wimbledon, and was so impressed by the play of Peter Fleming and John McEnroe that he asked, "Who are they going to play in the final? Do we know yet?", to which his astonished colleague replied, "This is the final..." Unable to pronounce the name of Serbian player Slobodan Živojinović, he settled, to the bewilderment of his colleagues and the audience, on 'Bobo'. This was what he thought to be Živojinović's nickname; it is in fact Boba.

Robertson also wrote a number of books, mainly about sports and antiques, his best known work probably being Wimbledon 1877–1977. He retired in 1986 after describing Boris Becker's second Wimbledon victory: "Beckermania forever! Becker the Boy King last year, now King Emperor...".

Robertson lived in Guernsey during the latter years of his life. Both his marriages ended in divorce. He had two sons by his first wife, Australian Nancy Suttor. He had a son and daughter by his second wife, children's author and creator of the Wombles, Elisabeth Beresford; they were married from 1949 until 1984. He died aged 94 in Guernsey.
