= Romilly Newman =

American chef, social media personality, and food stylist

- Born: Romilly Dauphin Newman; March 6, 1998 (age 28); New York City, U.S.
- Citizenship: United States; France
- Education: New York University (dropped out); Le Cordon Bleu, Paris
- Occupations: Chef; social media personality; food stylist
- Relatives: Peter Newman (father); James Newman (brother); Griffin Newman (brother); Marc Brandel (maternal grandfather); Claude Dauphin (maternal step-grandfather); J. D. Beresford (maternal great-grandfather); Elizabeth Beresford (great-aunt)
- Website: romillynewman.com

Romilly Dauphin Newman (born March 6, 1998) is an American chef, social media personality, and food stylist. She was referred to as the "Gen-Z Martha Stewart" by Town & Country magazine.

== Life ==
Newman was born March 6, 1998, in New York City, the youngest of three children, to Peter Ross Newman, a film producer, and Antonia Beresford Dauphin, an actress. She grew up in Greenwich Village and was educated at Saint Ann's School in Brooklyn, then attended New York University for one year, followed by culinary training at Le Cordon-Bleu, Paris. As of 2023, Newman was living in Cobble Hill, Brooklyn.

Her two elder brothers are Griffin and James Newman, both of whom have worked as actors. An aunt, Tara Brandel, is a choreographer in Ireland, while another, Shaena Brandel, is a circus performer and teacher.
