= Elisabeth Beresford =

English children's author (1926–2010)

Elisabeth Beresford MBE
- Born: 6 August 1926; Paris, France
- Died: 24 December 2010 (aged 84); Alderney, Channel Islands
- Occupation: Author
- Spouse: Max Robertson (m. 1949; div. 1984)
- Children: 2
- Writing career
- Language: English
- Genres: Children's books, novels

Elisabeth Beresford MBE (/ˈbɛrɪsfərd/; 6 August 1926 – 24 December 2010), also known as Liza Beresford, was an English author of children's books. She is best known for creating The Wombles. Born into a literary family, she worked as a journalist, but struggled for success until she created the Wombles in the late 1960s. Their recycling theme was noted especially and the Wombles became popular with children across the world. While Beresford wrote many other works, the Wombles remained her best-known.

== Early life and career ==
Beresford was born on 6 August 1926 in Paris. Her father was J. D. Beresford, a successful novelist who also worked as a book reviewer for several papers. Her godparents included Walter de la Mare, who dedicated poems to her, the poet Cecil Day-Lewis, and the children's writer Eleanor Farjeon. Her parents' friends included H. G. Wells, George Bernard Shaw, John Galsworthy, Hugh Walpole, W. Somerset Maugham and D. H. Lawrence. Beresford attended Brighton and Hove High School.

After 18 months' service as a Wren, Beresford set out as a ghostwriter specialising in writing speeches. She began training as a journalist, and was soon writing radio, film and television columns and working as a BBC radio reporter.

Beresford married BBC tennis commentator and broadcaster Max Robertson in 1949. They had one son and one daughter. Trips to Australia, South Africa and the West Indies with Robertson led her to write children's books. The Television Mystery (1957), her first, was among several "conventional adventure stories and thrillers", and two television series: Seven Days to Sydney and Come to the Caribbean. Awkward Magic (1964) was the first of several fantasies after the manner of E. Nesbit.

Beresford struggled as a children's author and freelance journalist in the 1960s. This changed with her creation of the Wombles.

== The Wombles ==
The name "Wombles" was inspired by her daughter Kate's mispronunciation ("Ma, isn't it great on Wombledon Common?") when Beresford took her children to Wimbledon Common for a Boxing Day stroll. That same day, Beresford made a list of Womble names. Many characters were based on her family: Great Uncle Bulgaria on her father-in-law, Tobermory on her brother, a skilled inventor, Orinoco on her son, and Madame Cholet on her mother. The Wombles' names came from sources as varied as the town where Beresford's daughter went on a French exchange and the name of the college attended by a nephew.

The first Wombles book appeared in 1968, illustrated by Margaret Gordon, whose work on all the early Wombles books defined their distinctive appearance. After a broadcast on Jackanory, the BBC decided to make an animated series.

The Wombles' motto, "Make Good Use of Bad Rubbish", and their passion for recycling was far ahead of its time, and inspired children to begin organising "Womble Clearing Up Groups". Thirty-five five-minute films were broadcast on BBC1, accompanied by Mike Batt's music and the Wombles' theme song, "Wombling Free". Marked by actor Bernard Cribbins's voices and the work of animators Ivor Wood and (later) Barry Leith, the Wombles grew in popularity. Beresford took part in live phone-ins with children in Australia. In South Africa she enchanted a hundred Zulus with Womble stories. Back in England, she made countless public appearances with the Wombles across the country.

Within ten years, Beresford had written over 20 Wombles books (translated into more than 40 languages), another 30 television films, and a Wombles stage show, one version of which ran in the West End. The range of Wombles products that appeared included soap, T-shirts, mugs, washing-up cloths and soft toys.

== Books ==
- The Television Mystery (1957)
- The Flying Doctor Mystery (1958), set in Australia.
- Trouble at Tullington Castle (1958)
- Gappy Goes West (1959)
- Cocky and the Missing Castle (1959)
- The Tullington Film-Makers (1960)
- Two Gold Dolphins (1961)
- Strange Hiding Place (1962)
- Danger on the Old Pull 'n Push (1962)
- Diana in Television (1963)
- Paradise Island (1963). Adult romance.
- The Missing Formula Mystery (1963)
- The Mulberry Street Team (1963)
- Escape to Happiness (1964). Adult romance.
- Awkward Magic (1964); also appeared as The Magic World (1965). First of eight magic books.
- The Flying Doctor to the Rescue (1964)
- Holiday for Slippy (1964)
- Roses Round the Door (1965). Adult romance.
- Game, Set and Match (1965)
- Travelling Magic (1965); also appeared as The Vanishing Garden (1967). Second of eight magic books.
- Knights of the Cardboard Castle (1965)
- Island of Shadows (1966). Adult romance.
- Peter Climbs a Tree (1966). Reissued in Beginning to Read Storybook (1977)
- Veronica (1967). Adult romance.
- Fashion Girl (1967)
- The Mulberry Street Team (1963)
- More Adventure Stories (1967). Reissues of "The Mulberry Street Team", "Holiday for Slippy" and "The Hidden Mill".
- The Black Mountain Mystery (1967)
- Sea-Green Magic (1968). Third of eight magic books.
- The Wombles (1968). First of five Wombles books.
- A Tropical Affair (1968). Adult romance.
- The Island Bus (1968)
- David Goes Fishing (1969)
- Looking for a Friend (1969)
- Saturday's Child (1969)
- Stephen and the Shaggy Dog (1970)
- The Wandering Wombles (1970). Second of five Wombles books.
- Vanishing Magic (1970). Fourth of eight magic books.
- Gordon's Go-Kart (1970). Issued in French as Le go-kart de Gaston (1972). Reissued in Rainbow Pavement and other stories (1978)
- Love Remembered (1970). Adult romance.
- Dangerous Magic (1972). Fifth of eight magic books.
- Love and the S.S. Beatrice (1972). Adult romance.
- Thunder of Her Heart (1972). Adult romance.
- The Wombles in Danger (1973). 32-page picture book.
- The Wombles at Work (1973). Third of five Wombles books.
- The Secret Railway (1973). After moving from Birmingham to Aldport, Norfolk, Barny and Sue are bored. But then they discover the abandoned Marsh End railway station, and with local boy Andy, set about restoring it.
- The Wombles Make a Clean Sweep (1973). 32-page picture book.
- The Invisible Womble and Other Stories (1973). Contains five stories: "A Breath of Fresh Air", "Bungo's Birthday Surprise", "Peep-Peep-Peep", "The Invisible Womble", and "The Purple Paw Mystery".
- Invisible Magic (1974). Sixth of eight magic books.
- Pandora (1974). Adult romance.
- The Wombles to the Rescue (1974). Fourth of five Wombles books.
- The Wombles Gift Book (1975). 65-page picture book.
- Snuffle to the Rescue (1975)
- Tomsk and the Tired Tree (1975). 28-page Little Womble picture book.
- Orinoco Runs Away (1975). 28-page Little Womble picture book.
- The Snow Womble (1975). 28-page Little Womble picture book.
- Wellington and the Blue Balloon (1975). 28-page Little Womble picture book.
- The Wombles Go Round the World (1976). Fifth of five Wombles books.
- Madame Cholet's Picnic Party (1976). 28-page Little Womble picture book.
- Tobermory's Big Surprise (1976). 28-page Little Womble picture book.
- Bungo Knows Best (1976). 28-page Little Womble picture book.
- The MacWomble Pipe Band (1976). 28-page Little Womble picture book.
- Wombling Free (1978).
- Move On (1978). With Peter Spence. Reader for illiterate adults.
- Secret Magic (1978). Seventh of eight magic books.
- Toby's Luck (1978). Seventh of eight magic books.
- The Happy Ghost (1979).
- Echoes of Love (1979). Adult romance.
- The Steadfast Lover (1980). Adult romance.
- The Silver Chain (1980). Adult romance.
- Curious Magic (1980). Eighth of eight magic books.
- The Treasure Hunters (1980).
- The Four of Us (1981).
- The Restless Heart (1982). Adult romance.
- Jack and the Magic Stove (1982).
- The Treasure Hunters (1980).
- The Tovers (1982)
- The Animals Nobody Wanted (1982)
- A Passionate Adventure (1983)
- The Adventures of Poon (1984)
- The Mysterious Island (1984)
- One of the Family (1985)
- The Ghosts of Lupus Street School (1986)
- Emily and the Haunted Castle (1987)
- Once Upon a Time Stories (1987)
- The Secret Room (1987)
- The Island Railway (1988)
- Armada Adventure (1988)
- Rose (1989)
- Charlie's Ark (1989)
- The Wooden Gun (1989)
- Tim the Trumpet (1992)
- Jamies and the Rola Polar Bear (1993)
- Lizzy's War (1993)
- Rola Polar Bear and the Heat Wave (1994)
- The Smallest Whale (1996)
- Lizzy Fights On (1996)
- Camping and Cloudberries (1997). Wombles picture book.
- Chris the Climber (1997)
- Tomsk to the Rescue (1998). Wombles picture book.
- Beautiful Boating Weather (1998). Wombles picture book.
- Orinoco the Magnificent (1998). Wombles picture book.
- The Ghost of Wimbledon Common (1998). Wombles picture book.
- Island Treasure (1998)
- Shansi's Surprise (1999). Wombles picture book.
- Chaos on the Common (1999). Wombles picture book.
- The Great Cake Mystery (1999). Wombles picture book.
- Deep Space Wombles (1999). Wombles picture book.
- Buggy Trouble (1999). Wombles picture book.
- Bigfoot Womble (1999). Wombles picture book.
- The Great Womble Explorer (1999). Wombles picture book.
- Womble Winterland and Other Stories (1999). Wombles picture book. Includes: Womble Winterland; Orinoco the Magnificent; The Ghost of Wimbledon Common.
- Tessa on TV (2000). 32-page reader.
- Tommy in Trouble (2000). 32-page reader.
- Pirate Gold (2000). 32-page reader.
- A Wombling Winter Day (2000). Wombles picture book.
- The Sleep Wombler and Other Stories (2001). Wombles picture book. Includes: The sleep Wombler; Queen for a Day; What's a Womble?.

== Later life ==
Beresford and her family moved to Alderney in the Channel Islands in the mid-1970s. She and her husband Max Robertson divorced in 1984.

Apart from her Wombles books, Beresford wrote various adventure and mystery books for children, many based on the island of Alderney, where she lived in a 300-year-old cottage in St Anne. She collaborated with Jane Aireton on a children's television series for Channel Television, Bertie the Bat in 1990 and The Adventures of Dawdle the Donkey for ITV Anglia between 1996 and 1999. Beresford was made a Member of the Order of the British Empire for her services to children's literature in the 1998 New Year Honours.

Beresford died on 24 December 2010 in Alderney's Mignot Memorial Hospital. Her son reported the cause of her death as heart failure.

American actors Griffin Newman and James Newman are her great-nephews, being the grandsons of her brother Marc Brandel (Marcus Beresford).
