= The Unknown Singer =

The Unknown Singer may refer to:

- The Unknown Singer (1947 film), a French drama film
- The Unknown Singer (1931 film), a French drama film
