= J. D. Beresford =

English writer

J.D. Beresford
- Born: John Davys Beresford; 17 March 1873
- Died: 2 February 1947 (aged 73)
- Children: Elisabeth Beresford; Marcus Beresford (a.k.a. Marc Brandel)
- Writing career
- Genres: Science fiction, horror, ghost stories, mystery novel

John Davys Beresford (17 March 1873 – 2 February 1947) was an English writer, now remembered mainly for his early science fiction and some short stories of the horror story and ghost story genres. Beresford was a great admirer of H. G. Wells, and wrote the first critical study of Wells in 1915. His Wellsian novel The Hampdenshire Wonder (1911) was a major influence for the author Olaf Stapledon. His other science-fiction novels include The Riddle of the Tower, about a dystopian, hive-like society.

== Life ==
His father, John James Beresford (1821 – 1897), was a Fellow of St John's College, Cambridge, and Rector of Castor. His mother was Adelaide Elizabeth Morgan. J. D. Beresford was affected by infantile paralysis, which left him partially disabled. He was educated at Oundle.

After training to become an architect, he became a professional writer, first as a dramatist, and journalist. During early adulthood, he rejected his father's theism and became a "determined but defensive" agnostic. In 1903 Beresford read the book Human Personality and Its Survival of Bodily Death by the psychical researcher Frederic W. H. Myers, which Beresford later stated had an enormous influence on his thought. He combined a life in Edwardian literary London with time spent in the provinces, in particular Cornwall, where D. H. Lawrence had an extended stay in his Porthcothan cottage. During the period around the First World War Beresford befriended several British writers, including Dorothy Richardson, Walter de la Mare, Naomi Royde-Smith and May Sinclair. Later in life Beresford abandoned his earlier agnosticism and described himself as a Theosophist and a pacifist.

Beresford was also interested in psychology, and attended several meetings organised by Alfred Richard Orage to discuss psychological issues. Other attendees at these meetings included Havelock Ellis, Clifford Sharp, David Eder and Maurice Nicoll.

Beresford also contributed to numerous publications; in addition to being a book reviewer for The Manchester Guardian, he also wrote for the New Statesman, The Spectator, Westminster Gazette, and the Theosophist magazine The Aryan Path. At one time, Beresford was offered the editorship of the pacifist magazine Peace News but refused because he claimed he "would be a bad editor".

Beresford's interest with spiritualism and philosophy may be illustrated best by the publisher's notes to his novel, On A Huge Hill:

"Mr Beresford's readers have long known that that for him there are more things in heaven or earth than are dreamt of in official medical philosophy. He has used his novelist's skill to convince the sensitive reader that the age of miracles is not over, and that, in certain circumstances, the spirit may exercise what seem to us miraculous powers over the substance of the body. This he did in 'The Camberwell Miracle' and 'Peckover'; and in this absorbing novel, he returns to the theme, with the study of a man fitting himself to become a great healer."

== Personal life ==
Beresford was married twice, first to Florence Linda Brown (1870 – 1916) and then to Eveline "Trissy" Beatrice Auford Roskams (1880 – 1975) In 1930, he was reported as the father of four children.

At the time of the census of 1921, the Beresford family was living at White House, East Claydon, Buckinghamshire, with three servants living in and with two visitors, the illustrator Alan Odle and his wife the novelist Dorothy Richardson.

Elisabeth Beresford (1926–2010), children's writer and creator of The Wombles, was Beresford's daughter. Through his son, writer Marc Brandel (Marcus Beresford), he is the great-grandfather of American actors Griffin Newman and James Newman.

== Reception and influence ==
Upon publication in 1911, The Hampdenshire Wonder was lauded by George Bernard Shaw.

Reviewing Beresford's novel 1921 Revolution, Virginia Woolf criticised the novel's characterisations, but praised its "intellectual efficiency". In 1924, the French writer Abel Chevalley lauded Beresford as a writer " most equally endowed with that intelligence and that imagination of life which make good writers of fiction."

Dorothy L. Sayers quotes from Beresford's book Writing Aloud in her book on theology, Mind of the Maker; Sayers calls Writing Aloud "an extraordinarily fascinating book." She also mentions him in passing in Whose Body?.

John Betjeman, reviewing The Riddle of the Tower for the Daily Herald, called the book "a great feat of the imagination."

George Orwell in 1945 described him as a "natural novelist", whose strength, particularly in A Candidate For Truth, was his ability to take seriously the problems of ordinary people.

In 1971 Graham Greene wrote that "The Hampdenshire Wonder remains one of the finest and most neglected novels of this period between the great wars."

== Works ==
- The Early History of Jacob Stahl (1911), the first of a trilogy of novels with A Candidate For Truth and The Invisible Event
- The Hampdenshire Wonder (1911) Novel
- A Candidate For Truth (1912)
- Goslings: A World of Women (1913) Novel
- The House in Demetrius Road (1914) Novel
- The Invisible Event (1915) Novel
- H.G. Wells (1915) criticism
- These Lynneskers (1916) Novel
- William Elphinstone Ford (1917) biography, with Kenneth Richmond
- House Mates (1917) Novel
- Nineteen Impressions (1918) stories
- God's Counterpoint (1918) Novel
- The Jervaise Comedy (1919) Novel
- The Imperfect Mother (1920) Novel
- Signs and Wonders (1921, Golden Cockerel Press) stories
- Revolution (1921) Novel
- The Prisoners of Hartling (1922) Novel
- The Imperturbable Duchess and Other Stories (1923)
- Monkey Puzzle (1925)
- That Kind of Man, or Almost Pagan (1926) Novel
- The Decoy (1927) Novel
- The Instrument of Destiny (1928) mystery novel
- All or Nothing (1928) Novel
- Writing Aloud (1928) Non-fiction
- Real People (1929) Novel
- The Meeting Place and Other Stories (1929)
- Love's Illusion (1930)
- The Next Generation (1932) Novel
- The Old People (1932) Novel
- The Camberwell Miracle (1933) novel
- Peckover (1934) Novel
- On A Huge Hill (1935) Novel
- Blackthorn Winter and other stories (1936)
- Cleo (1937) Novel
- What Dreams May Come (1941) Novel
- A Common Enemy (1941) Novel
- Men in the Same Boat (1943) (with Esmé Wynne-Tyson)
- The Riddle of the Tower (1944) (with Esmé Wynne-Tyson) (reprinted by Solar Press in 2023)
- The Gift (1947) (with Esmé Wynne-Tyson)
- The Prisoner
- Love's Pilgrim
- The Tapestry
