= Choice of Arms =

- Directed by: Alain Corneau
- Written by: Michel Grisolia; Alain Corneau
- Produced by: Larry Nesis; Alain Sarde
- Starring: Yves Montand; Gérard Depardieu; Catherine Deneuve
- Cinematography: Pierre-William Glenn
- Edited by: Thierry Derocles
- Music by: Philippe Sarde
- Production companies: Sara Films; Parafrance Films; Antenne 2 R.M.C.
- Distributed by: Parafrance Films
- Release date: 1981
- Running time: 135 minutes
- Country: France
- Language: French

Choice of Arms (French: Le Choix des armes) is a 1981 French crime drama film, directed by Alain Corneau and starring Yves Montand, Gérard Depardieu and Catherine Deneuve. It tells the story of a retired gangster (Montand) who is forced to return to his old life when he and his wife (Deneuve) are threatened by a younger, unhinged criminal (Depardieu).

== Plot ==
Serge, an aging gangster, escapes from prison together with Mickey, a younger convict. A violent psychopath, Mickey kills two police officers along the way. Ricky, the friend of Mickey who helped the pair escape, betrays them by leading them into an ambush by Sylvain Constantini, an old enemy of Serge. In the resulting shootout, Serge is wounded and Sylvain is killed; Mickey manages to escape with Serge. Seeking help, the two men eventually reach the home of Noël Durieux, one of Serge's former associates.

Noël has fully retired from illegal activities and lives a quiet, comfortable life with his wife Nicole, breeding horses on their large estate in the Paris countryside; when Serge and Mickey arrived, he and Nicole were about to leave for Ireland to buy a house there. Unwilling to return to crime, Noël nevertheless agrees to lend the two men a hideout while Serge recovers. Police commissioner Bonnardot and his deputy Sarlat search for the two fugitives; Bonnardot, who is familiar with Serge's generation of gangsters, suspects that Noël could be involved.

Mickey eventually grows impatient and leaves for the inner Paris suburbs, where he tries to see his young daughter, Karine; he barely knows the child, whose mother died and of whom he has no custody. In the meantime, Serge dies from his wounds, after which Noël buries him. When Noël informs him of this over the phone, Mickey demands that Noël help him, threatening to denounce Noël and Nicole to the police.

Bonnardot and Sarlat question Noël at his home. Mickey stumbles upon them as he returns; after overpowering Bonnardot, he escapes and holes up in Paris, having become convinced that Noël betrayed him to the police. Mickey first crashes at the home of Fernand, an acquaintance whom he bullies and extorts money from, and is later given shelter by Dany, another accomplice.

Mickey decides to blackmail Noël. He and Dany break into Noël's home while a dinner party is in progress; Mickey threatens Noël, Nicole, and their guests at gunpoint, and shoots furniture before leaving. Noël pursues Mickey in an attempt to stop him, but has a car accident and is briefly detained by Bonnardot.

Noël later sends Nicole to a hotel for her safety and calls on two old associates to help him find the madman. To hinder Mickey, they ransack the home of Raymond Constantini (Sylvain's brother) and frame Mickey for it; Raymond is fooled, and sends his men after Mickey. Noël and his friends capture Ricky, whom they question about Mickey's background. They later locate Mickey; however, when Noël's friends give him a gun to shoot Mickey, Noël decides against it, not wishing to return to violence.

Upon learning that a prize mare is sick, Nicole slips back home one night. Mickey, who had been waiting there, takes her hostage. The police have been trailing her, and Sarlat attempts a showdown with Mickey. In the exchange of gunfire, Sarlat accidentally kills Nicole while Mickey gets away.

Noël feels responsible for Nicole's death, not having shot Mickey when he had the chance. Meanwhile, Mickey kidnaps his daughter; Noël ambushes Mickey but, upon seeing Mickey with the child, once again decides against killing him.

Mickey and Dany later attempt to rob a local bank; Mickey is shot by the guard, and Dany flees. Noël, who had been monitoring them, picks up the wounded man and takes him to a safe house; Mickey tells Noël what occurred with Nicole. The police locate the hideout, and in the ensuing shootout, Sarlat kills Mickey.

Sarlat empties the rest of his magazine at Noël, but misses. Noël then takes Sarlat hostage and drives away with him. On a lonely road, he empties his own magazine next to Sarlat's head—deliberately missing him—and leaves him there in shock.

Later, Noël picks up Mickey's daughter and leaves with her, having decided to care for the orphaned child.

== Cast ==
- Yves Montand as Noël Durieux
- Gérard Depardieu as Mickey
- Catherine Deneuve as Nicole Durieux
- Michel Galabru as Bonnardot
- Jean-Claude Dauphin as Ricky
- Gérard Lanvin as Sarlat
- Christian Marquand as Jean
- Pierre Forget as Serge
- Étienne Chicot as Roland Davout
- Richard Anconina as Dany
- Roland Blanche as Fernand
- Michel Caron as Grangier
- Jean Rougerie as Raymond Constantini
- Karine Lenoir as Karine
- Marc Chapiteau as Savin

== Production ==
The script was written by Corneau with crime fiction author Michel Grisolia, who also adapted it into a novelization.

Filming began on 5 January 1981, and wrapped in March. Principal photography took place for the most part in the Paris metropolitan area, with some scenes shot in Ireland. Filming locations included Paris, La Courneuve, Saint-Denis, Montreuil, Créteil, Suresnes and Puteaux. The scenes at Noël's property were shot in Fontenay-Saint-Père.

The film's score was composed by Philippe Sarde; it also featured American jazz contrebasse players Ron Carter and Buster Williams, accompanied by the London Symphony Orchestra.

== Reception ==
Choice of Arms was commercially successful in France, where it sold 1,787,299 admissions. The film was number one at the box office upon release, though it later experienced a drop in attendance; it was bypassed in its third week by Tais-toi quand tu parles, a comedy starring Aldo Maccione, then in its fourth week by another comedy, Men Prefer Fat Girls, which had opened on the same day as Corneau's film and proved more enduring commercially. The film's success nevertheless allowed Corneau to embark on his next project, the high-budget period romantic war drama Fort Saganne, also starring Gérard Depardieu.

Whereas Alain Corneau's previous crime films, including Police Python 357 which already starred Yves Montand, had been well-received by French critics, their response for Choice of Arms was not as good. Several reviewers found it less inventive than the director's previous entries, and criticized it as a lumbering, star-studded vehicle; Libération, in particular, panned it as a "dreadful" representative of old-fashioned French filmmaking. Reviewers at France Inter's radio show Le Masque et la plume agreed that the film, while well-made, was inferior to Corneau's previous crime films, and found Deneuve's role underdeveloped; on the other hand, one of the panelists, Georges Charensol, found particular merit in Depardieu's performance.

Conversely, Jacques Siclier of Le Monde gave the film a positive review, praising the film's unconventional writing, and its social and psychological undertones. He also lauded Depardieu's "genius" performance, and noted Gérard Lanvin's promising turn.

François Guérif, a French crime fiction expert and publisher, analyzed the film as a clever juxtaposition of the atmosphere of French noir cinema from the 1950s-60s, embodied by Yves Montand's character and the gangsters of his generation, with more contemporary themes related to drugs and urban violence in disadvantaged French suburbs. Guérif also noted the western-like structure of several scenes.

== Home video ==
The film was released on DVD and Blu-Ray, as well as on several streaming services, including Amazon Prime and Canal+. In 2025, the British distributor HMV reissued it in the Blu-ray box set "Hardboiled", alongside two other crime films by Alain Corneau, Police Python 357 and Série noire.
