= Women and Brigands =

1950 film

- Theatrical film poster
- Italian: Donne e briganti
- Directed by: Mario Soldati
- Written by: Pierre Lestringuez; Nicola Manzari; Vittorio Nino Novarese; Mario Soldati
- Produced by: Valentino Brosio
- Starring: Amedeo Nazzari; Maria Mauban; Jean Chevrier
- Cinematography: Mario Montuori
- Edited by: Mario Serandrei
- Music by: Nino Rota
- Production company: Lux Film
- Distributed by: Lux Film
- Release date: 3 November 1950
- Running time: 85 minutes
- Countries: France; Italy
- Language: Italian

Women and Brigands (Italian: Donne e briganti) is a 1950 French-Italian historical melodrama adventure film directed by Mario Soldati and starring Amedeo Nazzari, Maria Mauban and Jean Chevrier. It is based on the story of the legendary guerrilla fighter Fra Diavolo, who led a major uprising against French forces in Naples during the Napoleonic Wars. In 1953 it was released in a dubbed version in the United States under the alternative title The King's Guerrillas.

The film was made at the Farnesina Studios in Rome with Location shooting taking place at the Royal Palace of Caserta. The films's sets were designed by the art director Ottavio Scotti. It earned around 206 million lira at the Italian box office.

== Cast ==
- Amedeo Nazzari as Michele Pezza/Fra Diavolo
- Maria Mauban as Marietta
- Jean Chevrier as General Hugo
- Paolo Stoppa as Peppino Luciani
- Enrico Viarisio as Cardinal Ruffo
- Nando Bruno as Beato
- Jacqueline Pierreux as Nora
- Giuseppe Porelli as Ferdinand IV, King of Naples
- Guido Celano as Bourbon Sergeant
- Felice Minotti as Furiere Dupont
- Virgilio Riento as Friar Marco
- Enrico Luzi as sentry
- Nino Vingelli as Ciccillo
- Ada Dondini as Mother superior
- Rina Franchetti as Sister Emilia
- Augusto Di Giovanni as Guardia al palazzo reale
- Anna Maria Canali as Bambina
- Gianni Luda as Brigante

== See also ==
- The Adventures of Fra Diavolo (1942)
