= Blank Check with Griffin & David =

American film podcast

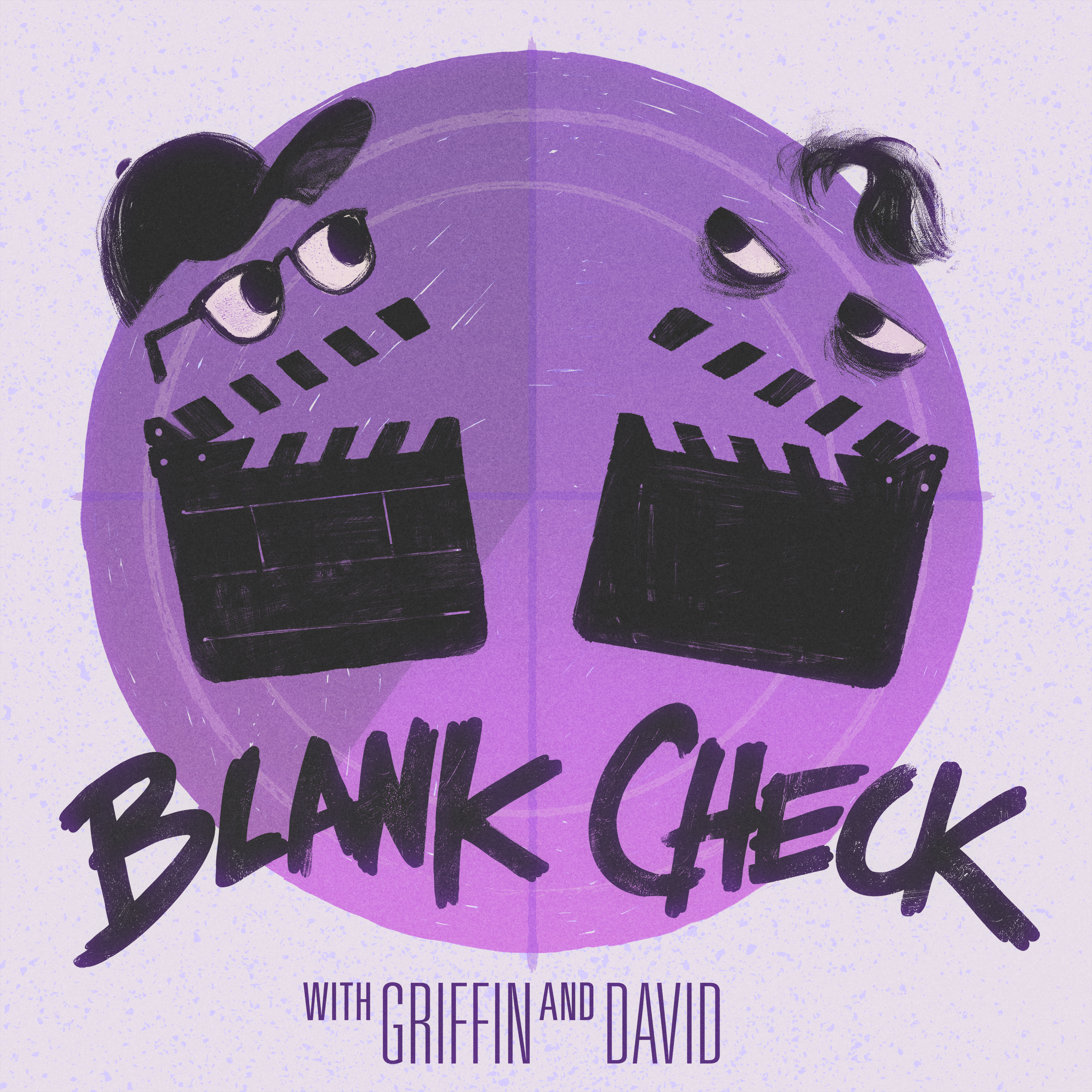
- Genre: Film; Comedy
- Language: English

Cast and voices
- Hosted by: Griffin Newman; David Sims

Music
- Theme music composed by: Layne Montgomery and The Great American Novel

Production
- Production: Ben Hosley (production); Marie Bardi-Salinas (social media/production, 2020–present); Angela Ferraguto (co-production, 2018–2020); JJ Bersch (research)
- Editing: Alex Barron; AJ McKeon

Technical specifications
- Audio format: Podcast (via streaming or downloadable MP3)

Publication
- No. of episodes: 595 (as of August 23, 2026)
- Original release: March 23, 2015
- Provider: UCB Comedy (2015–2017); AudioBoom (2017–2021); Independent (2021–present)
- Updates: Weekly

Related
- Website: Audioboom/BlankCheckPod

Blank Check with Griffin & David is a film podcast following the career output of notable directors who had significant success early in their careers and were then offered a figurative blank check to pursue their passion projects. Most episodes focus on a single movie from the director's filmography, and the show's episodes are grouped into miniseries, in which some or all of the director's films are reviewed. Founded in 2015, the show is hosted by actor Griffin Newman and The Atlantic film critic David Sims.

== Series overview ==
The Blank Check website describes the podcast as:

Not just another bad movie podcast, Blank Check reviews directors' complete filmographies episode to episode. Specifically, the auteurs whose early successes afforded them the rare 'blank check' from Hollywood to produce passion projects. Each new miniseries, hosts Griffin Newman and David Sims delve into the works of film's most outsized personalities in painstakingly hilarious detail.

Notable guests who have appeared on the show include Rachel Zegler, Jamelle Bouie, Leslye Headland, Jamie Bell, Kevin Smith, David Lowery, Patton Oswalt, Tatiana Maslany, Richard Lawson, Lulu Wang, Ayo Edebiri, Karina Longworth, Alex Ross Perry, Roman Mars, Nia DaCosta, Bowen Yang, Amy Irving, David Krumholtz, Jane Schoenbrun, Lin-Manuel Miranda, Ari Aster, Zach Cregger, Seth Rogen, and Marc Maron.

=== Origins: Griffin and David Present ===
In 2015, the podcast began as Griffin and David Present, and assessed the Star Wars prequel films as if in a universe where the other Star Wars films did not exist. Originally planning to spend 50 episodes on each film, producer Ben Hosley convinced the hosts to only do ten. Having used a lengthy analysis of a filmography as a means of discussing the films' director, Newman and Sims decided to use a similar approach in reviewing the works of other directors, and retitled the show Blank Check with Griffin and David.

	Title	Director	Initial Release		
	Title	Director	Episodes	First episode	Last episode
1	The Phantom Podcast	George Lucas	11	March 23, 2015	June 1, 2015
2	Attack of the Podcast	George Lucas	10	June 22, 2015	September 8, 2015
3	Revenge of The Podcast	George Lucas	10	September 21, 2015	November 30, 2015
4	The Star Wars Sequels	George Lucas	6	December 6, 2015	January 11, 2016

=== Blank Check with Griffin & David ===
Each miniseries is given a loosely comedic title which combines the word "podcast" with either a title of a film or the director's name. If a director they've previously discussed releases a new film, they will work it into their schedule of upcoming shows.

	Director	Title	Coincides with	Initial Release		
	Director	Title	Coincides with	Episodes	First episode	Last episode
1	M. Night Shyamalan	Pod Night Shyamacast	N/A	11	January 25, 2016	April 12, 2016
2	The Wachowskis	The Podchowski Casters	N/A	9	April 18, 2016	June 10, 2016
3	Cameron Crowe	We Pod A Cast	N/A	10	June 23, 2016	August 26, 2016
4	James Cameron	Podinator: Judgment Cast	N/A	11	September 18, 2016	December 3, 2016
5	Steven Spielberg (The DreamWorks Years) (Note: Only films directed by Spielberg after he co-founded DreamWorks Pictures in 1994 are reviewed.)	Pod Me If You Cast	N/A	15	January 28, 2017	May 20, 2017
6	Christopher Nolan	The Pod Knight Casts	Dunkirk	10	June 25, 2017	August 13, 2017
7	Kathryn Bigelow	Pod-19: The Widowcaster	Detroit	10	September 17, 2017	November 19, 2017
8	Paul Verhoeven (English language films) (Note: Only English-language films directed by Verhoeven are reviewed.)	Podship Casters	N/A	8	January 7, 2018	March 4, 2018
9	James L. Brooks	Podcast News	N/A	7	March 18, 2018	April 29, 2018
10	Brad Bird	The Podcastibles	Incredibles 2	7	May 13, 2018	June 28, 2018
11	Ang Lee	Podback Mountcast	N/A	13	July 1, 2018	September 27, 2018
12	Nancy Meyers	Something's Podda Cast	N/A	7	October 14, 2018	November 25, 2018
13	Tim Burton	Podward Scissorcast	Dumbo	17	December 9, 2018	April 28, 2019
14	Michael Mann	Michael Mannsplaining/Cast of the Podhicans	N/A	12	May 19, 2019	August 4, 2019
15	Hayao Miyazaki	Howl's Moving Podcastle	N/A	12	August 11, 2019	November 7, 2019
16	Jonathan Demme	Stop Making Podcasts	N/A	16	November 10, 2019	March 19, 2020
17	George Miller	Mad Pod: Fury Cast	N/A	10	March 29, 2020	May 28, 2020
18	Nora Ephron	You've Got Podcast	N/A	9	June 7, 2020	August 2, 2020
19	Gina Prince-Bythewood	Pod & Basketcast	The Old Guard	4	August 9, 2020	August 30, 2020
20	Robert Zemeckis	Podcast Away	The Witches	20	September 6, 2020	January 31, 2021
21	Ron Clements/John Musker	The Poddle Mercast	N/A	7	February 7, 2021	March 21, 2021
22	Elaine May	The Podbreak Cast	N/A	4	April 4, 2021	April 25, 2021
23	John Singleton	Podz n the Cast	N/A	9	May 9, 2021	July 4, 2021
24	John Carpenter	They Podcast	N/A	18	August 8, 2021	December 5, 2021
25	Jane Campion	The Podcastiano	The Power of the Dog	9	January 9, 2022	March 6, 2022
26	Sam Raimi	Podcast Me to Hell	Doctor Strange in the Multiverse of Madness	15	March 20, 2022	June 26, 2022
27	Bob Fosse	Pod That Jazzcast	N/A	5	July 3, 2022	July 31, 2022
28	Stanley Kubrick	Pods Wide Cast	N/A	12	August 7, 2022	November 13, 2022
29	Henry Selick	Ben Hosley's The Podmare Before Castmas	Wendell & Wild	5	November 27, 2022	January 15, 2023
30	Danny Boyle	Trainspodcasting	N/A	13	January 22, 2023	April 30, 2023
31	Buster Keaton	Podcast Jr.	N/A	6	May 7, 2023	June 11, 2023
32	Park Chan-wook	I'm a Podcast, But That's OK	N/A	10	June 18, 2023	September 3, 2023
33	David Fincher	The Curious Pod of Benjamin Buttcast	The Killer	12	September 10, 2023	November 26, 2023
34	Bradley Cooper (Note: Initially a one-off review of Cooper’s first directed film, 2018’s A Star Is Born. Confirmed as an official series with the Maestro episode on December 17, 2023.)	A Pod Is Cast	Maestro	3	October 7, 2018	January 4, 2026
35	Barbra Streisand	Podcastl	N/A	5	January 14, 2024	February 4, 2024
36	John McTiernan	Pod Hard with a Vengecast	N/A	11	February 11, 2024	April 28, 2024
37	Satoshi Kon	Podprikast	N/A	4	May 5, 2024	May 26, 2024
38	Martin Brest	Podverly Hills Cast	N/A	6	June 9, 2024	July 14, 2024
39	Kevin Costner	Podcasts With Wolves	Horizon: An American Saga – Chapter 1	4	July 21, 2024	August 18, 2024
40	David Lynch	Twin Pods: Fire Cast With Me	N/A	15	August 25, 2024	December 22, 2024
41	Steven Spielberg (The Early Years) (Note: Only films directed by Spielberg before he co-founded DreamWorks Pictures in 1994 are reviewed.)	Podrassic Cast	N/A	15	January 5, 2025	April 20, 2025
42	Amy Heckerling	Pod Times at Ridgemont Cast	N/A	9	April 27, 2025	July 6, 2025
43	Coen Brothers	Pod Country for Old Cast	N/A	19	July 13, 2025	December 7, 2025
44	Lynne Ramsay	We Need to Pod About Castvin	Die My Love	5	January 18, 2026	February 22, 2026
45	Peter Weir	Podnic at Hanging Cast	N/A	13	March 8, 2026	June 7, 2026
46	Andrew Stanton	PODD-C	Toy Story 5	6	June 21, 2026	August 2, 2026
47	Martin Scorsese	PodcastFellas	N/A	25	August 9, 2026	TBA

== Blank Check: Special Features ==
On January 1, 2019, Newman and Sims created a Patreon page, Blank Check: Special Features, where fans could pay a monthly amount in exchange for extra content. Blank Check Special Features focuses primarily on audio commentary about films that are part of franchises, including the Marvel Cinematic Universe, Toy Story, Mission: Impossible, The Santa Clause and Alien. The Patreon feed also offers monthly bonus episodes and other content related to the current miniseries or general interest.

As of June 2025, the Blank Check Patreon was ranked 12th in the podcast category and 33rd overall based on the number of paying supporters, with 17,762 subscribers.

	Franchise	Initial Release		
	Franchise	Episodes	First episode	Last episode
1	Marvel Cinematic Universe	23	January 1, 2019	December 1, 2019
2	Star Wars (Note: Only films that take place chronologically after the Prequels.)	8	January 1, 2020	April 21, 2020
3	Toy Story	5	May 11, 2020	June 21, 2020
4	Mission: Impossible	6	June 30, 2020	September 21, 2020
5	Alien	6	October 1, 2020	December 21, 2020
6	Crocodile Dundee	3	January 1, 2021	February 1, 2021
7	Star Trek (Note: Only films based on the original Star Trek series are covered. Any subsequent Star Trek films would be covered in their own miniseries.)	6	February 21, 2021	May 1, 2021
8	The Twilight Saga	5	May 21, 2021	July 21, 2021
9	The Chronicles of Riddick	3	August 1, 2021	September 1, 2021
10	The Mummy	5	September 22, 2021	November 11, 2021
11	The Santa Clause	3	November 21, 2021	December 21, 2021
12	Ghostbusters	4	January 1, 2022	February 21, 2022
13	The Matrix	4	March 1, 2022	April 21, 2022
14	Batman (Note: Only wide release Batman movies not previously covered on the podcast are covered.)	7	May 1, 2022	August 1, 2022
15	Roger Moore Bond	7	August 21, 2022	November 21, 2022
16	National Treasure	2	December 1, 2022	December 21, 2022
17	Qatsi Trilogy	3	January 1, 2023	February 1, 2023
18	Men in Black	4	February 21, 2023	April 1, 2023
19	Planet of the Apes (Note: Only the original five films from 1968-1973 are covered.)	5	April 21, 2023	June 21, 2023
20	Ocean's	5	July 1, 2023	September 1, 2023
21	Pierce Brosnan Bond	4	September 21, 2023	November 1, 2023
22	Austin Powers (Note: Also included The Love Guru.)	4	November 21, 2023	January 1, 2024
23	Terminator	6	January 21, 2024	April 1, 2024
24	Teenage Mutant Ninja Turtles	7	April 21, 2024	July 21, 2024
25	Tabletop Games (Note: Includes Clue, Dungeons & Dragons, Battleship, Ouija, Ouija: Origin of Evil, and Dungeons & Dragons: Honor Among Thieves)	6	August 1, 2024	October 21, 2024
26	Andrew Lloyd Webber adaptations (Note: Includes Jesus Christ Superstar, Evita, The Phantom of the Opera, and Cats)	4	November 1, 2024	December 21, 2024
27	The Jelly Trilogy (Note: Includes Analyze This, Mickey Blue Eyes, and Analyze That)	3	January 1, 2025	February 1, 2025
28	Star Trek: The Next Generation (Note: Only films based on the Star Trek: The Next Generation series and Galaxy Quest are covered. Any subsequent Star Trek or Dean Parisot films would be covered in their own miniseries.)	5	February 21, 2025	April 21, 2025
29	Superman (Note: Includes Superman I-IV, Superman Returns, Man of Steel, and Superman)	7	May 1, 2025	July 21, 2025
30	90s Indie comics (Note: Includes The Mask, The Crow, Tank Girl, Judge Dredd, Barb Wire, Spawn, Mystery Men, and Dredd)	8	August 1, 2025	November 21, 2025
31	Timothy Dalton Bond	2	December 1, 2025	December 21, 2025
32	Oz adaptations (Note: Includes The Wizard of Oz, The Wiz, Return to Oz, Wicked, and Wicked: For Good)	5	January 1, 2026	March 11, 2026
33	Mortal Kombat	4	March 21, 2026	May 21, 2026
34	RoboCop	4	June 1, 2026	July 21, 2026
35	Resident Evil	7	August 1, 2026	November 1, 2026

== Blank Check: March Madness ==
Every March since 2018, there has been a March Madness style bracket pitting thirty-two directors against each other, allowing listeners to vote and decide a director to be covered later in the year. Until 2022, the votes were cast through Twitter polls, but were later moved to the Blank Check website following use of bots to influence match-ups. Since 2020, there have been brackets exclusive to the Patreon to decide a franchise to cover.

Year	Theme	Winner	Runner-Up
2018	N/A	Nancy Meyers	David Fincher
2019	N/A	Jonathan Demme	George Miller
2020	Oscars vs. Razzies	Robert Zemeckis	Barry Sonnenfeld
2021	Hosts vs. Guests	John Carpenter	Gore Verbinski
2022	20th Century Filmmakers	Stanley Kubrick	Orson Welles
2023	World Cup/International	Park Chan-wook	Bong Joon-ho
2024	The New Blood	David Lynch	Spike Lee
2025	Decade of Dreams	Coen brothers	Peter Weir
2026	Losers Only	Martin Scorsese	Tony Scott

== Reception ==
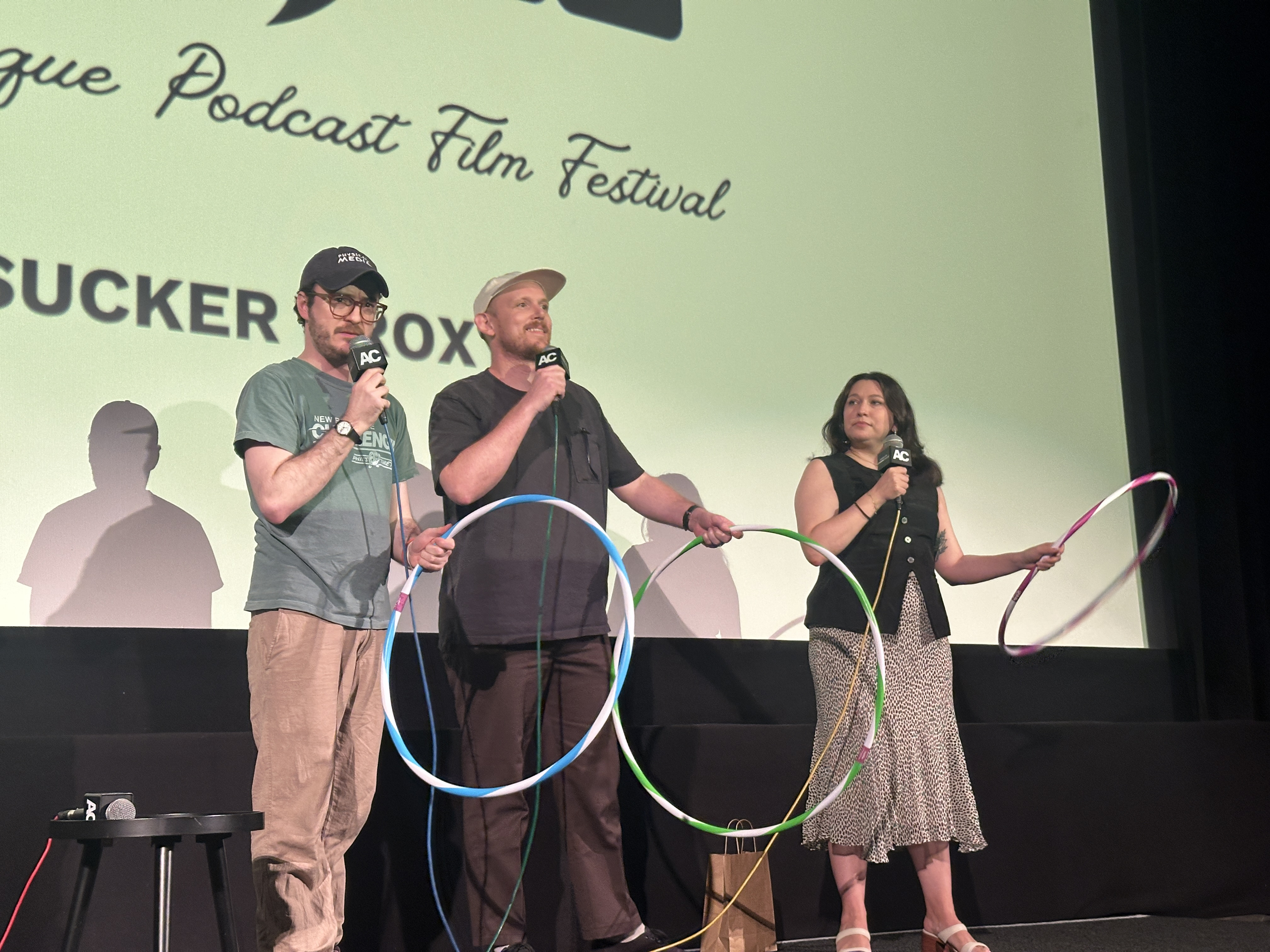
Newman, Hosley, and Bardi-Salinas in 2025.

Blank Check has been positively reviewed by Paste, Decider, and The A.V. Club. The show was included in Esquire's list of the best 21 podcasts of 2018, as well as on Paste's list of the top 30 podcasts of the decade. It has also been featured in Vulture and Entertainment Weekly as a selection of the week. In May 2023, Luis A. Gómez of The New Yorker wrote about the podcast, stating that "Newman and Sims reveal themselves as connoisseurs of context in engaging, discursive conversations" and are "a positive, authoritative voice in the film-podcasting landscape."

The show was an honoree in the 2025 Webby Awards. The show was also nominated for best TV and Film podcast in the 2025 iHeartRadio podcast awards.
