= Beau Masque =

- Directed by: Bernard Paul; assistant: Alain Corneau
- Written by: Bernard Paul and Richard Bohringer, from the original novel by Roger Vailland
- Starring: Luigi Diberti; Dominique Labourier; Jean-Claude Dauphin; Catherine Allégret; Gaby Sylvia; Massimo Serato; Jean Dasté
- Music by: André Hodeir
- Release date: 29 November 1972
- Running time: 95 minute
- Country: France
- Language: Italian

Beau Masque (Handsome Face) is a Franco-Italian film directed by Bernard Paul and released in 1972.

== Synopsis ==
In a region in the east of France, Pierrette, (Dominique Labourier), a young mill worker devotes herself totally to her trade union activity even to the detriment of her private life. She has separated from her husband and left her child in the care of a relative. Two men enter into her life. She crosses first the path of an émigré Italian, nicknamed Beau Masque, (Luigi Diberti), a truck driver. Then, at the time of a dance organised by the French Communist Party, she makes the acquaintance of Philippe Letourneau (Jean-Claude Dauphin), the factory director. He is the young 'son of the family', pushed into the business by his parents who are majority shareholders. Though attracted to Philippe, Pierrette takes no action, not wanting to compromise her union activity. It is with Beau Masque that she begins a relationship. But a wave of redundancies, that the director does not control, is going to throw the protagonists towards a final drama.

== Cast ==
- Luigi Diberti as Beau Masque
- Dominique Labourier as Pierrette
- Jean-Claude Dauphin as Philippe
- Catherine Allégret as Marguerite
- Gaby Sylvia as Émilie
- Massimo Serato as Valério
- Jean Dasté as Cuvrot
- Hélène Vallier as Louise
- Pierre Maguelon as Mignot
- Evelyne Dress as Nathalie
- Maurice Travail as Tallagrand
- Georges Rouquier as Vizille

== Notes ==
According to Françoise Arnoul, (writing in her memoirs Animal doué de bonheur ISBN 2-7144-3244-1), Jane Fonda was the initial choice to play the role of Pierrette but Paramount-France grew less keen on the film the more they looked at it - they thought it too warm to communist ideology. Eventually Bernard Paul was told Fonda was not available. Location filming took place in Villerupt, Meurthe-et-Moselle and Ain.
