= East Claydon =

Village in Buckinghamshire, England

Coordinates: 51.9241°N 0.9290°W

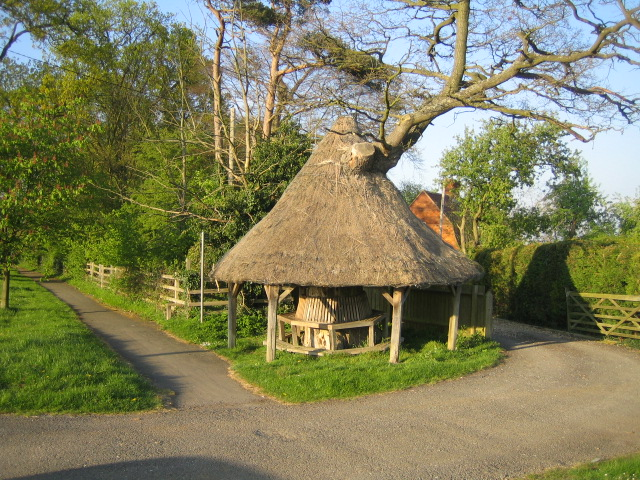
- Thatched tree shelter in East Claydon

- Location within Buckinghamshire
- Population: 345 (2011 Census)
- OS grid reference: SP735255
- Unitary authority: Buckinghamshire
- Ceremonial county: Buckinghamshire
- Region: South East
- Country: England
- Sovereign state: United Kingdom
- Post town: BUCKINGHAM
- Postcode district: MK18
- Dialling code: 01296
- Police: Thames Valley
- Fire: Buckinghamshire
- Ambulance: South Central
- UK Parliament: Mid Buckinghamshire

East Claydon is a village and civil parish in the unitary authority of Buckinghamshire, England. It is about 2 1/2 miles (4 km) south-west of Winslow.

The village name 'Claydon' is Anglo Saxon in origin, and derives from the Old English: clægig + dun meaning 'clay hill'. The affix 'East' is used to differentiate the village from nearby Steeple Claydon and Middle Claydon, and from the hamlet of Botolph Claydon that lies within the parish of East Claydon.

The parish church dedicated to St Mary was demolished during the English Civil War by Cornelius Holland, one of King Charles's judges, but was rebuilt after the restoration. The current structure is largely of 18th century design, but comprises components from various centuries, the earliest of which is the 13th century.

East Claydon School is a mixed, community, nursery, infant and junior school, which takes children from the age of three through to the age of 11, when they generally move to a school in Waddesdon or Winslow. The school is quite small, with approximately ninety pupils.

== Notable people ==
- John Davys Beresford (1873–1947), author, and his son Marc Brandel, lived in the village at the White House.
