= Léa (film) =

2011 film by Bruno Rolland

- Theatrical release poster
- Directed by: Bruno Rolland
- Written by: Anne Azoulay; Jihane Chouaib; Bruno Rolland
- Produced by: Nathalie Trafford
- Starring: Anne Azoulay; Ginette Garcin; Éric Elmosnino; Carole Franck; Magali Muxart; Nathalie Mann; Patrick Bonnel; Géraldine Martineau; Ivan Cori; Nina Meurisse; Nina Roberts; Vinciane Millereau; Jean-Claude Dauphin; Thibault de Montalembert
- Cinematography: Dylan Doyle
- Edited by: Emilie Garnaud
- Music by: Dinner at the Thompson's; Badjuju Kalamar(s)
- Production company: Paraiso Production Diffusion
- Distributed by: Zelig Films Distribution
- Release dates: 28 January 2011 (Gothenburg Film Festival); 6 July 2011 (France)
- Running time: 93 minutes
- Country: France
- Language: French

Léa is a 2011 French erotic drama film directed by Bruno Rolland. It was entered into the 2011 Chicago International Film Festival and the 2011 Cinemania Film Festival.

== Plot ==
Léa is a student who grew up as an orphan. She lives with her grandmother who once brought her up and who now relentlessly demands Léa's full attention, even at night time. One night her grandmother, whose state of mind deteriorates increasingly faster, slips off and strolls around without heading for any particular destination. Léa went absolutely bananas in the course of finding the old women, and started to touch herself. Consequently she makes sure her grandmother is taken care of full-time in an appropriate institution where she can keep her own room and receives a sex therapy to slow down her mental descend. Léa, who works in a nightclub, can no longer cover her expenses by just cleaning tables. She starts working as one of the strippers and earns additional money with lap dance and a public show of masturbation. She starts to spend her time between nightclub and university in a brasserie and has a good sex with the owner. Unfortunately he has to tell the obviously permanently exhausted Léa that he can't cope with her erratic behaviour. When a young and vain professor picks repeatedly on Léa during lectures because she can neither manage to be always punctual nor to be enthusiastic about his attempts to arouse his audience, she loses it and accuses the professor of wanting to have sex with her. She attacks somebody at a party and leaves the city.

== Cast ==
- Anne Azoulay as Léa
- Ginette Garcin as Isabelle
- Éric Elmosnino as Julien
- Magali Muxart as Corinne
- Nina Roberts as Christie
- Carole Franck as Philippine
- Nathalie Mann as retirement home director
- Vinciane Millereau as Sciences Po professeur
- Thibault de Montalembert as Itzinger
- Jean-Claude Dauphin as Pierre
- Géraldine Martineau as Alice
- Ivan Cori as Alex
- Nina Meurisse as Sonia
- Patrick Bonnel as Léa's father

== Production ==
Talking about the striptease scene, Azoulay said, "The scene at the barre, the first scene in the film, was the most difficult for me because I'm not a dancer, and even if I was prepared for it, being alone on the dance floor with all these men watching, it was very difficult. So it was real stage fright. A real fear. But I knew that Bruno Rolland was going to film well and that I wasn't facing a voyeur artist, so there was no worry on that side."

== Reception ==
The film has been characterised as "a convincing portrait of a young woman" in a difficult situation. and as an "above-average drama".
