= Botolph Claydon =

Hamlet in Buckinghamshire, England

Coordinates: 51.914362°N 0.935769°W

- Location within Buckinghamshire
- OS grid reference: SP7324
- Unitary authority: Buckinghamshire
- Ceremonial county: Buckinghamshire
- Region: South East
- Country: England
- Sovereign state: United Kingdom
- Post town: BUCKINGHAM
- Postcode district: MK18
- Dialling code: 01296
- Police: Thames Valley
- Fire: Buckinghamshire
- Ambulance: South Central
- UK Parliament: Mid Buckinghamshire

Botolph Claydon is a hamlet in the civil parish of East Claydon, in Buckinghamshire, England. It is situated about 9 miles (14 km) east of Bicester in Oxfordshire, and 7 miles (11 km) north west of Aylesbury.

Anciently the hamlet was called Botyl Claydon. The prefix comes from the Anglo-Saxon word botyl meaning 'house'. The word Claydon is also Anglo Saxon, and means 'clay hill'.

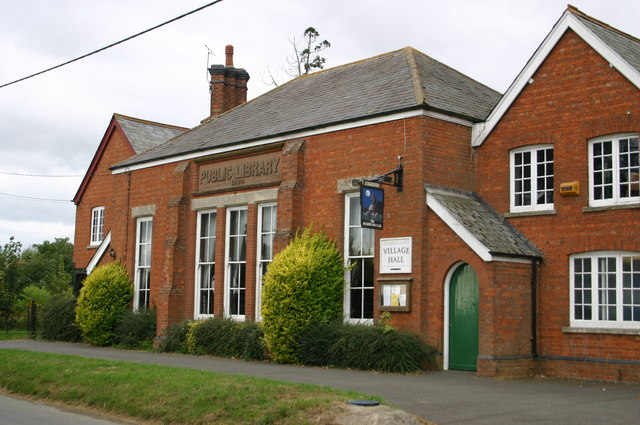
The village hall, formerly library

The village hall, built in 1912, was once the village library and was donated to the villages of East and Botolph Claydon by the Verney Family.
