= Maria Mauban =

French actress (1924–2014)

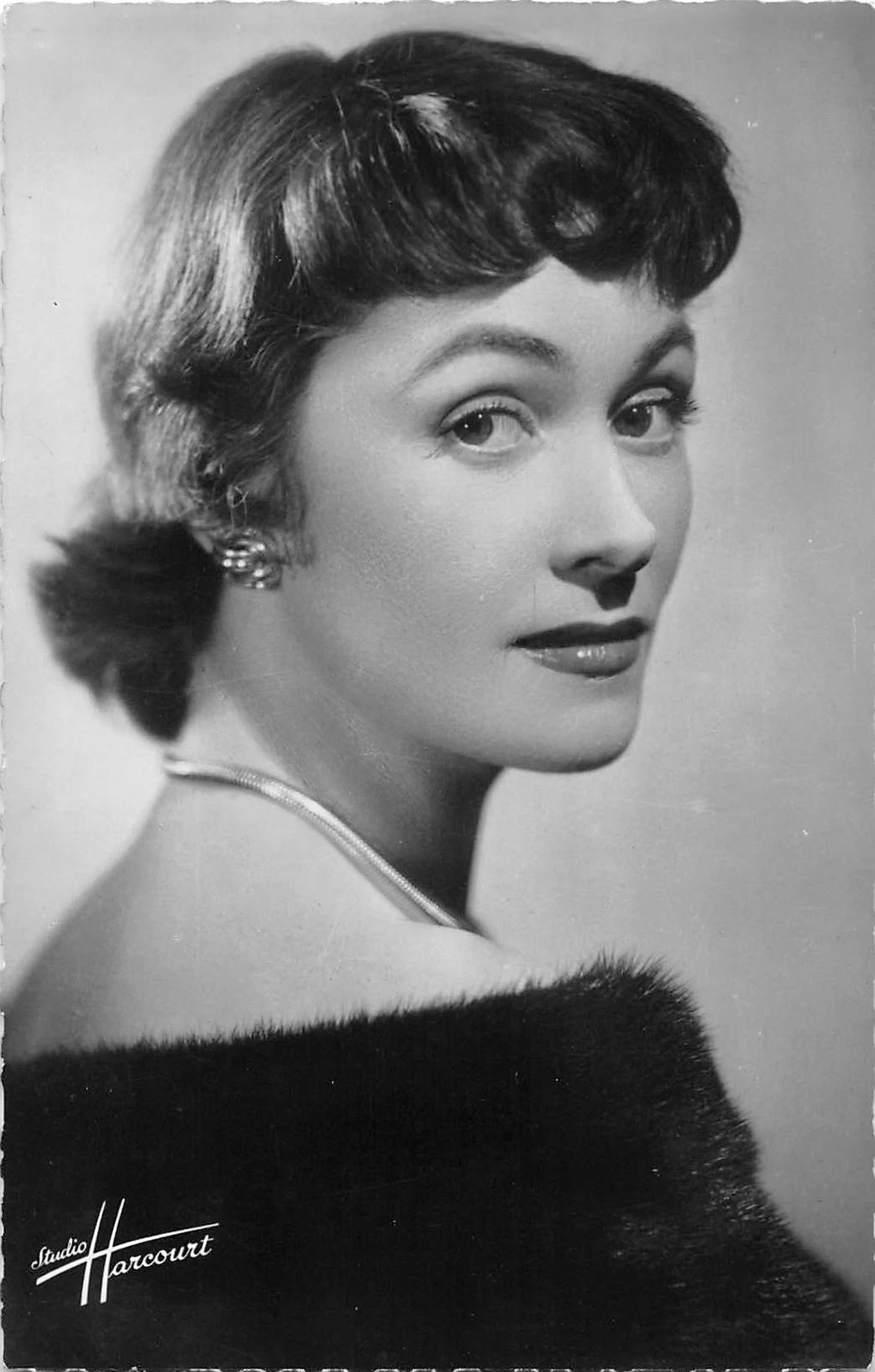
- Born: 10 May 1924; Marseille, France
- Died: 26 August 2014 (aged 90); Montcresson, France
- Other name: Marcelle Michelle
- Occupation: Actress
- Years active: 1946–1989

Maria Mauban (10 May 1924 – 26 August 2014) was a French actress. She appeared in around fifty films and television series during her career. in 1950 she starred in the British Egyptian-set crime film Cairo Road. The same year she appeared in the Ealing Studios film Cage of Gold. In 1954 she appeared in Roberto Rossellini's Journey to Italy.

She was married to the industrialist Jean Versini and then to the actor Claude Dauphin. They had two children, the actor Jean-Claude Dauphin and Elena Adriana Negru.

Maria Mauban died on 26 August 2014.

== Selected filmography ==
- The Unknown Singer (1947)
- The Cupid Club (1949)
- Cairo Road (1950)
- Cage of Gold (1950)
- Women and Brigands (1950)
- Quay of Grenelle (1950)
- Village Feud (1951)
- The Passerby (1951)
- The Happiest of Men (1952)
- Journey to Italy (1954)
- Public Opinion (1954)
- Eighteen Hour Stopover (1955)
- The Rival (1956)
- Easiest Profession (1957)
- Life Together (1958)
- Hellé (1972)
