= Giles Gordon =

Scottish literary agent and writer (1940–2003)

- Born: Giles Alexander Esmé Gordon; 23 May 1940; Edinburgh, Scotland
- Died: 14 November 2003 (aged 63); Edinburgh, Scotland
- Education: Edinburgh Academy; Edinburgh College of Art
- Spouse(s): Margaret Eastoe, m. 1964–1989, her death Maggie McKernan, m. 1990
- Parent: Esmé Gordon (father)

Giles Alexander Esmé Gordon (23 May 1940 – 14 November 2003) was a Scottish literary agent and writer, based for most of his career in London.

== Early life and education ==
The son of Esmé Gordon (1910–1993), an architect and Honorary Secretary (1973–1978) of the Royal Scottish Academy, and his wife Betsy, Giles Gordon was born in Edinburgh, Scotland, and was educated at the Edinburgh Academy, an independent day school. Here he acted in school productions, including Iolanthe, with future broadcaster Gordon Honeycombe, among others. After school, where Giles persistently failed examinations, he attended, for a time, Edinburgh College of Art, where his father lectured on architecture.

== Publishing career ==
In 1959, Gordon joined the Edinburgh publisher Oliver and Boyd as a trainee; he remained as their employee for nearly four years. In 1961 and 1962, he edited the first four issues of the Saltire Society's quarterly magazine New Saltire. In 1962, he moved to London, and was advertising manager for Secker & Warburg for a year, editor at Hutchinson in 1966, and then of the plays list at Penguin, where he launched the Penguin Modern Playwrights series. He became editorial director at Gollancz in 1967 and stayed for five years, abolishing the uniform style in which the company's books had previously appeared. At this time, he interviewed playwrights for Transatlantic Review.

In 1972, he clashed with the directors at Gollancz over their desire to remove some of the sex from a novel by Dennis Potter, and joined agent Anthony Sheil, later Sheil Land Associates, aiming to improve the terms for authors. Among the writers he represented at one time or another were Peter Ackroyd, Allan Massie, Penelope Mortimer, Vikram Seth, Sue Townsend, Barry Unsworth and Fay Weldon.

He recognised the merits of an early Adrian (then Nigel) Mole sketch by Townsend, and persuaded her to turn it into a full-length book, which together with its sequel sold more copies than any other two books by the same author during the 1980s. Of wider significance, he suggested Spycatcher by Peter Wright, with Paul Greengrass, be written. The book, which the British government attempted to ban internationally, detailed allegations of a criminal activity by the security services in which the principal author had directly participated. As an agent, he was successful in securing larger fees for his clients, including a £650,000 advance for Peter Ackroyd's biographies of Blake and Dickens and a £250,000 advance for Vikram Seth's first novel and later £1.3 million for Two Lives, a memoir of Seth's great-uncle and aunt.

He returned to his love of the theatre as drama critic for The Spectator (1983–1984) and the London Daily News briefly published by Robert Maxwell in 1987. He also leaked bookish gossip to the satirical magazine Private Eye and wrote their "Bookworm" column.

Breaking with his employer Sheil Land in 1994, he was prevented by a court order from contact with his clients lest he poach them. He set up the Scottish office of Curtis Brown in 1994. The offshoot was quietly closed after Gordon's death.

== Writing ==
In 1966, he released a collection of poems, Two & Two Make One, which was published by Akros on a print run of 350 copies. He also wrote half a dozen novels between 1971 and 1980, and later a memoir Aren't We Due a Royalty Statement (1993), a title that caused accusations of impropriety by quoting a comment from one of his clients, the Prince of Wales.

== Personal life ==
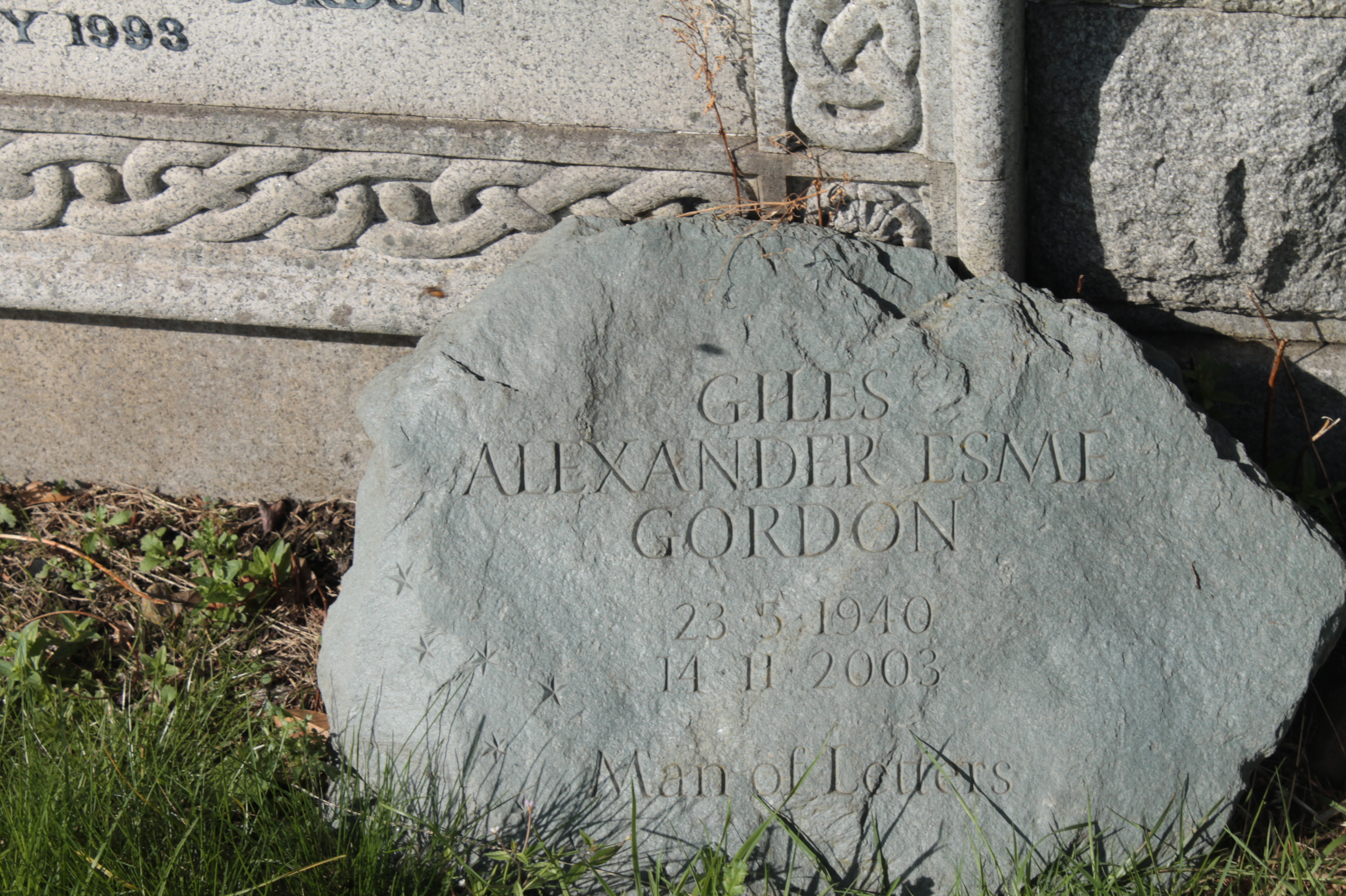
The grave of Giles Gordon, Grange Cemetery

He married Margaret Eastoe in 1964; they had two sons and a daughter. His daughter Hattie had, at the time of her father's death, just published a memoir of her brother Gareth, who had died by suicide in 1994 at the age of 24. His wife Margaret died of an incurable illness in 1989. Gordon's second marriage was to Maggie McKernan in 1990, with whom he had a son and two daughters.

Gordon died aged 63, from injuries sustained in a fall a fortnight earlier outside his home in Edinburgh. His funeral took place at St Giles' Cathedral, Edinburgh, and later a memorial service was held in London at the church of St-Martin-in-the-Fields on 17 March 2004. He has a small marker stone at the foot of his parents' grave, where he is buried, against the north wall of the south-western extension of Grange Cemetery in Edinburgh.

== Selected bibliography ==
=== Novels ===
- The Umbrella Man. London: Allison and Busby, 1971.
- About a Marriage. London: Allison and Busby; and New York: Stein and Day, 1972.
- Girl with Red Hair. London: Hutchinson, 1974.
- 100 Scenes from Married Life: A Selection. London: Hutchinson, 1976.
- Enemies: A Novel about Friendship. Hassocks, Sussex: Harvester Press, 1977.
- Ambrose's Vision: Sketches Towards the Creation of a Cathedral. Brighton: Harvester Press, 1980.

=== Short stories ===
- Pictures from an Exhibition. London: Allison and Busby; and New York: Dial Press, 1970.
- Farewell, Fond Dreams. London: Hutchinson, 1975.
- The Illusionist and Other Fictions. Hassocks, Sussex: Harvester Press, 1978.
- Couple. Knotting, Bedfordshire: Sceptre Press, 1978.

== Reviews ==
- Sawday, Jonathan (1980), review of Ambrose's Vision: Sketches Towards the Creation of a Cathedral, in Cencrastus No. 4, Winter 1980-81, pp. 46–47, ISSN 0264-0856
