= David Sims (critic) =

Journalist, editor, and American media personality

- Born: Manhattan, New York
- Education: Newcastle University
- Occupations: Journalist, editor, podcast host
- Children: 3

David Sims is an American pop culture critic who reviews television and movies. He spent his childhood and young adulthood growing up in New York City and London, England. He is most known for his pop culture writing, starting in 2009 with The AV Club where he recapped, and reviewed television shows. In 2014 he joined The Atlantic to become a part of the writing staff covering television, movies, and other pop culture. Shortly after joining The Atlantic, in 2015, Sims started a podcast, with his friend and actor Griffin Newman which came to be known as Blank Check with Griffin & David.

== Early life ==
Sims was born in Manhattan, New York to a mother who was a city hall reporter, and a father who worked for the Bloomberg business news organization. While in New York he attended Public School 87, and enjoyed parks, museums, and playing little league baseball games. Sims has said that he developed his love of movies on his own, from the personal joy he experienced on his first viewing of Aladdin, to combing through The New York Times Arts section for movie posters for upcoming films. In 1994 his family moved to London as a result of his father's position at Bloomberg News. Sims would spend the rest of his childhood and his higher education in London. He finished his higher education at Newcastle University.

== Career ==
After graduating college he took on two jobs in the field of journalism. One job was as education reporter for a local New York City paper The Chief-Leader, and the other job was writing recaps and reviews, as a freelancer, for the pop culture site The AV Club. Sims would keep The AV Club post for five years, from 2009 to 2014. During his time at The AV Club he contributed to 710 items to the news outlet. In 2014 he joined The Atlantic as a part of their writing staff, writing about movies and pop culture. His first piece was on March 3, 2014, predicting the 2014 Oscar nominees. By 2026 he would rise to be the Senior Associate Editor at The Atlantic. Sims is also a member of both the New York Film Critics Circle, and also the Critics Choice Association.

In 2015, Sims, with his friend and actor Griffin Newman, formed the podcast Blank Check with Griffin & David. The show is about directors’ filmographies, those who've had massive success, early on in their careers, and are given a series of blank checks to make whatever passion projects they want. The show explores whether the movies made by successful pre-established directors are flops or successes by telling stories about how the films were made, from its financing to behind the scenes conflicts. Since 2016 the podcast has covered 44 directors, including M. Night Shyamalan, the Wachowski siblings, Steven Spielberg, Ang Lee, Hayao Miyazaki, Jane Campion, David Lynch, John Singleton and Gina Prince-Bythewood. The podcast has produced nearly 600 episodes.

As a result of his pop culture expertise, and his position at The Atlantic he has twice been invited to appear on WNYC’s All Of It with Alison Stewart once in 2019, and again in 2022. In his first appearance, he was part of a panel discussion, which reviewed the end of the television series Game of Thrones. In his second time on the show he discussed major financial losses by the streaming service Netflix.

== Personal life ==
Sims lives in Brooklyn with his wife, daughter and twin boys.
