= The Friends (film) =

1971 film

- Directed by: Gérard Blain
- Written by: Gérard Blain; André Debaecque
- Starring: Philippe March
- Release date: 10 November 1971
- Running time: 100 minutes
- Country: France
- Language: French

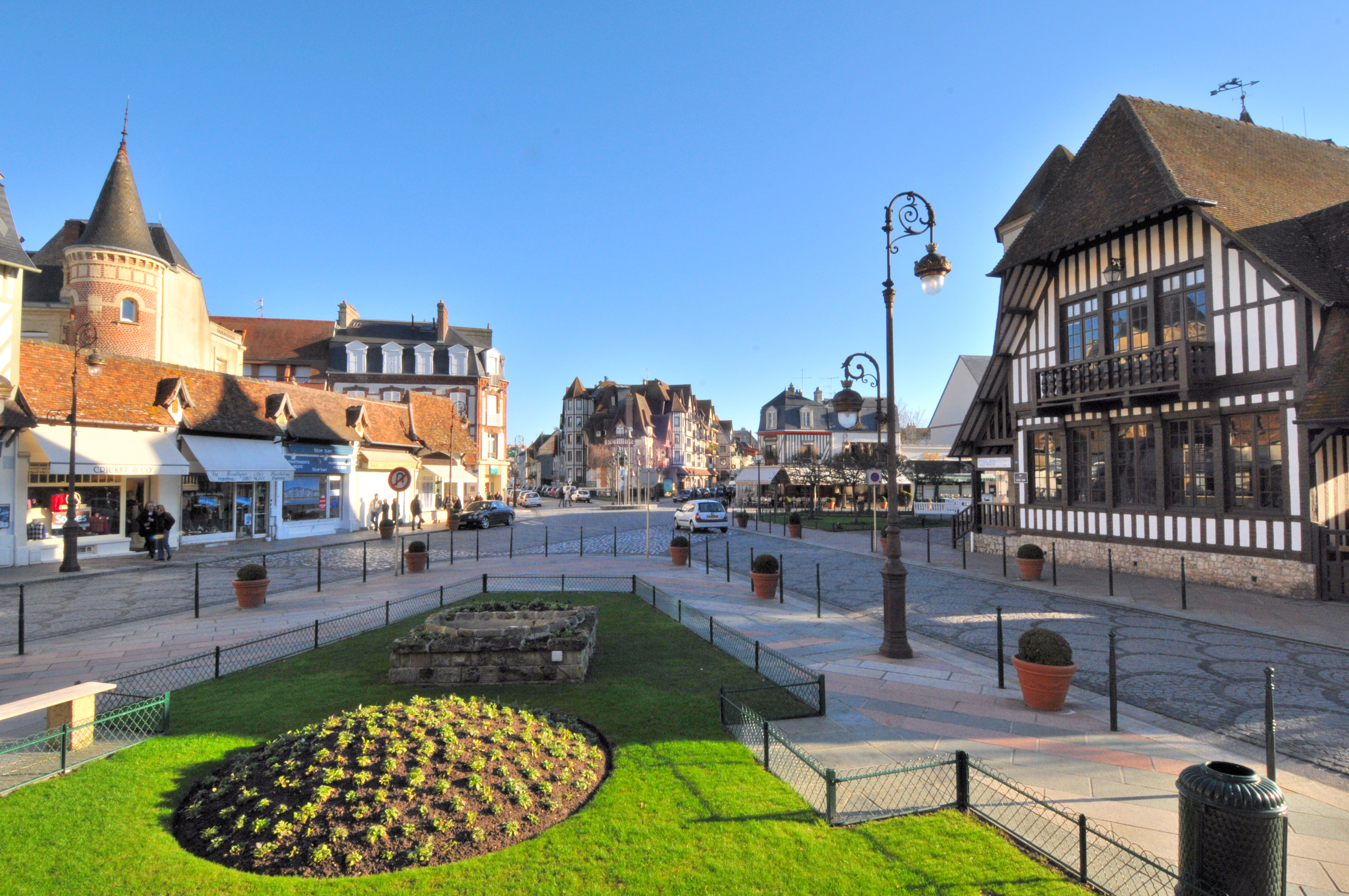
Most of the film is set in Deauville, a seaside resort for the wealthy.

The Friends (French: Les Amis) is a 1971 French drama film directed by Gérard Blain. The film won the Golden Leopard at the Locarno International Film Festival.

== Plot ==
Paul (Yann Favre), a 16-year-old aspiring actor, has an affair with Philippe (Philippe March), a married and very wealthy businessman. The two go on a trip to Deauville in Philippe's sports car and check into a luxury hotel.

Paul, who is from a comparatively poor family, makes friends with the rich young people in Deauville. Thanks to Philippe's financial support, he can afford nice clothes, but there are other giveaways that he is not from a rich family himself, e.g. his inability to ride a horse, so he takes lessons. To fit in better with the rich kids, Paul invents a fake background story for himself, where Philippe's occupation and wealth stand in for his real (and divorced) father. When Paul and Philippe later meet the Deauville rich kids in a bar, Paul introduces Philippe as his godfather and a friend of his supposedly wealthy family.

A few days later, Philippe has to return to Paris for business. Paul would like to stay in Deauville for a little longer and gets some more money from Philippe. Paul starts an affair with Marie-Laure (Nathalie Fontaine), but unlike his warm and loving relationship with Philippe, his fling with Marie-Laure only consists of sex and ends when Marie-Laure dumps him for another young man.

After Philippe dies in a car accident, Paul is alone again, with Nicolas (Jean-Claude Dauphin), the only real friend he made in Deauville and who suspected the nature of the relationship between Paul and his "godfather" Philippe, accompanying him to the cemetery to watch Philippe's burial from afar.

== Cast ==
- Philippe March as Philippe
- Yann Favre as Paul
- Jean-Claude Dauphin as Nicolas
- Nathalie Fontaine as Marie-Laure
- Dany Roussel as La mère de Paul
- Claude Larcher as Béatrice
- Hélène Zanicolli as Monique (as Hélène Zanicoli)
- Christian Chevreuse as Maître Manège
- Martin Pierlot as Jean-Marc
- Liliane Valais as La mère de Marie-Laure
- Vincent Gauthier as Olivier
- Sylvie Delanoë
- Jean-Claude Holzen as Richard
- Dominique Oudard as Le groom
