= Margaret Gordon (illustrator) =

British illustrator (1939–1989)

Margaret Anna Gordon (19 May 1939 – 31 December 1989), born Margaret Anna Eastoe, was a British children's book illustrator, best known for depicting The Wombles in Elisabeth Beresford's books and her own series about Wilberforce the mischievous bear, which she both wrote and illustrated.

== Career ==
Born in London on 19 May 1939 to musician parents, Margaret Anna Eastoe (who was known professionally after 1964 by her husband Giles Gordon's surname), studied at St Martin's School of Art, but moved to Camberwell College of Arts because, she said, all the women at Saint Martin's were there to find husbands and she wanted to be an artist, and the Central School of Arts and Crafts. She then became a part-time teacher in Bexhill, but continued to paint, exhibiting her first work in 1965.

She illustrated a number of books for Macmillan, including George MacBeth's Noah's Journey, before producing her own picture book The Green Children (with Macmillan's Kevin Crossley-Holland) in 1966. This won the best children's book prize from the Arts Council in 1968. She and Crossley-Holland published The Callow Pit Coffer and The Peddler of Swaffham in 1968 and 1971 respectively, and she then published Walter and the Balloon with her husband. As well as her usual colour work, she also produced black and white sketches to illustrate Alison Jezard's series of Albert books about a teddy bear.

Her most well-known illustrations were for Elisabeth Beresford's The Wombles series of books, first published in 1968 and later adapted into the popular television series. Beresford provided more Womble stories in response to their popularity, and Margaret worked long hours, seven days a week to complete the accompanying illustrations for twenty books. For this reason, after the Wombles, she would only illustrate a book if she was paid a royalty rather than an outright fee. The demand for more Womble books meant additional illustrators were enlisted by the publisher Ernest Benn, but the definitive visual interpretation of the animals was Margaret Gordon's.

In the mid-1980s, she began to both write and illustrate books, including her successful series about a mischievous bear named Wilberforce. She intensely disliked the razzamatazz of the publishing world and was utterly uninterested in its gossip. She was particularly happy to be taken up by Walker books in the last years of her life as she much admired their books. She was a versatile artist and excelled in both black and white line drawings, where she combined detailed backgrounds with cartoon-like simplification of the principal figures, and in coloured work.

== Personal ==
She was born and brought up in Battersea, London, by her professional musician parents, with her younger brother, the harpsichord tuner John Eastoe, and sister Jane Eastoe. She claimed this gave her an artistic temperament but ensured she did not take up music as a career. She met Giles Gordon in a publishing house when she was touting her portfolio of illustrations around publishers. She was married to him from 1964 to 1987, when she left him and moved to Oundle, Northamptonshire, to be near her sister. She said she should have left him years earlier when he published thinly veiled accounts of their marriage as novels. In Oundle she began a new relationship and had the "Happiest months of my life," before her untimely death from bronchopneumonia and dermatomyosistis. She died aged 50 on 31 December 1989. She had three children.

== Selected works ==
- Noah's Journey with George MacBeth (1964)
- The Green Children with Kevin Crossley-Holland (1966)
- Emily's Voyage with Emma Smith (1966)
- The Callow Pit Coffer with Kevin Crossley-Holland (1968)
- The Wombles with Elisabeth Beresford (1968)
- Jonah and the Lord with George MacBeth (1969)
- A House for Jones with Helen Cresswell (1969)
- The Wandering Wombles with Elisabeth Beresford (1970)
- Albert with Alison Jezard (1970)
- Albert and Henry with Alison Jezard (1970)
- Albert's Christmas with Alison Jezard (1970)
- The Pedlar of Swaffham with Kevin Crossley-Holland (1971)
- Lillapig by Peter John Stephens (1972)
- Albert Goes to Sea with Alison Jezard (1973)
- All Sorts of Everything with Malcolm Carrick (1973)
- Albert and Tum Tum with Alison Jezard (1973)
- Walter and the Balloon with Giles Gordon (1974)
- Albert up the River with Alison Jezard (1974)
- The Wombles to the Rescue with Elisabeth Beresford (1974)
- A Paper of Pins (1975)
- Albert and Digger with Alison Jezard (1975)
- Tomsk and the Tired Tree with Elisabeth Beresford (1975)
- Wellington and the Blue Balloon with Elisabeth Beresford (1975)
- The Wombles Go Round the World with Elisabeth Beresford (1976)
- Tobermory's Big Surprise with Elisabeth Beresford (1976)
- The MacWomble's Pipe Band with Elisabeth Beresford (1976)
- Madam Cholet's Picnic Party with Elisabeth Beresford (1976)
- Bungo Knows Best with Elisabeth Beresford (1976)
- Albert in Scotland with Alison Jezard (1976)
- Albert Goes Trekking with Alison Jezard (1976)
- Albert's Circus with Alison Jezard (1977)
- Albert Goes Treasure Hunting with Alison Jezard (1978)
- Albert on the Farm with Alison Jezard (1979)
- My Aunt Polly with Helen Cresswell (1979)
- My Aunt Polly by the Sea with Helen Cresswell (1980)
- Tales from the Wind in the Willows with Kenneth Grahame (1985)
- Recipes & Rhymes: A Children's Cookery Book with Elaine Bastable (2013)

The following books were written and illustrated by Margaret Gordon

- Wilberforce Goes on a Picnic (1982)
- The Supermarket Mice (1984)
- Wilberforce Goes shopping (1985)
- Wilberforce Goes to a Party (1986)
- Wilberforce Goes to Playgroup (1987)
- Frog's Holiday (1988)
- Mousetale (1988)
- Getting to Know Cousin Rodney (1990)
- Help! (1990)
- Willie Whiskers (1991)
