= The Witness (1969 French film) =

The Witness - A Change of Heart
- Directed by: Anne Walter
- Written by: Anne Walter
- Produced by: Pierre Levie; René Thévenet
- Starring: Claude Jade; Gérard Barray; Jean-Claude Dauphin
- Cinematography: Roger Duculot
- Edited by: Colette Cueille
- Music by: François de Roubaix; Patrice Sciorrino
- Release date: 1969
- Country: Belgium
- Language: French

The Witness - A Change of Heart (French: Le Témoin, Flemish De Getuige) is a 1969 French/Belgian film directed by Anne Walter.

== Synopsis ==
Cecile lodges with the astrologer lady Hanka, and teaches English at a college in Bruges. Cecile's horoscope is "Venus in Capricorn - the cold, winter, solitude." Cecile has a boyfriend called Thomas. Their relationship is calm and peaceful, not to say uneventful. Then Cecile meets a strange man, the museum curator Van Britten. But the old lady is shot dead. Cecile remembers having often noticed the silhouette of a man watching the house. It's Hermann, Van Britten's chauffeur.

Then the net begins to close in on Van Britten, but Cecile cannot resist seeing him again: She is as fatally intrigued by him as a bird by a snake. Sometimes she tries to get away... The climax comes in Van Britten's castle. Cecile becomes his mistress, while Hermann resolves that the witness Cecile must die, because she "knows." Van Britten and Cecile are trying to escape abroad by boat. Hermann and Van Britten are mortally wounded. Cecile studies the stars and horoscopes: "Venus in Capricorn - the cold, winter solitude..."

== Cast ==
- Claude Jade (Cecile)
- Gérard Barray (Van Britten)
- Jean-Claude Dauphin (Thomas)
- Claude Vernier (Hermann)
- Jeanne Pérez (Madame Hanka)
- Bernard Frémaux (Commissaire Haas)
