= Peter Newman (film producer) =

American film producer and educator

Peter Ross Newman
- Born: Peter Ross Newman; November 26, 1952 (age 73); White Plains, New York, U.S.
- Occupations: Film producer, educator
- Spouse: Antonia Beresford Dauphin (m. 1988)
- Children: Romilly; Griffin; James
- Relatives: Claude Dauphin (father-in-law)

Peter Ross Newman (born November 26, 1952) is an American film producer, educator and former sportscaster. Newman has produced films by directors such as Robert Altman, Jonathan Demme, John Sayles and Noah Baumbach. Since 1980, he has been the president of Peter Newman Productions. He is the father to chef Romilly Newman and actors Griffin Newman and James Newman.

== Early life and education ==
Newman was born November 26, 1952 in White Plains, New York, to Leonard and Roslyn Newman (née Orlofsky). He was raised in White Plains and Bedford, New York. His father was the owner and founder of Leonard Newman Agency, a leading insurance brokerage in White Plains. He has a brother, Scott Newman, and a sister, Wendy Newman. He attended Northwestern University and began his producing career in the 1980s.

== Career ==
Newman founded his own production firm, New York-based Peter Newman Productions, in 1980. He has been an industry leader in theatrical films, having produced over 30 movies. As of 2022, he is an associate professor at New York University, teaching courses at both the Tisch School of the Arts and the Stern School of Business; in 2008, he was named the first head of a dual MFA-MBA program, which the university describes as the first of its kind in the United States.

== Personal life ==
In 1988, Newman married the casting director and filmmaker Antonia Beresford Dauphin, the elder daughter of the writer Marc Brandel. They are the parents of the chef Romilly Newman and the actors Griffin and James Newman.

As of 2013, Newman lives between Greenwich Village, Manhattan, and a vacation home on Blackberry Farm, in the Great Smoky Mountains.

== Selected filmography ==
- O.C. and Stiggs (1987)
- Swimming to Cambodia (1987)
- Lord of the Flies (1990)
- Dogfight (1991)
- The Secret of Roan Inish (1994)
- Blue in the Face (1995)
- Smoke (1995)
- Space Truckers (1996)
- The Hairy Bird (1998)
- Interstate 60: Episodes of the Road (2002)
- The Squid and the Whale (2005)
- The Game of Their Lives (2005)
- The Music Never Stopped (2011)
