= Claude Dauphin (actor) =

French actor (1903–1978)

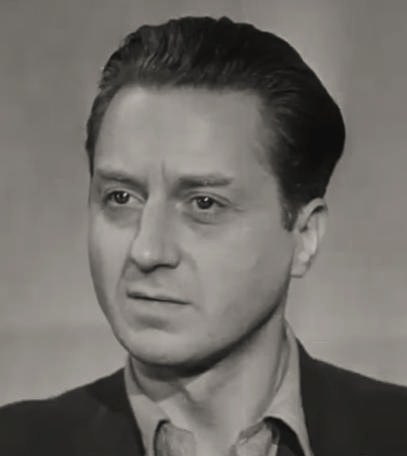
- Dauphin in the 1944 film A Salute to France
- Born: Claude Marie Eugène Legrand; 19 August 1903; Corbeil-Essonnes, Essonne, France
- Died: 16 November 1978 (aged 75); Paris, France
- Occupation: Actor
- Years active: 1930–1978
- Spouse(s): Rosine Derean; Maria Mauban; Norma Eberhardt (1955–1978; his death)
- Children: 2, including Jean-Claude
- Father: Maurice Étienne Legrand
- Relatives: Jean Nohain (brother); James Newman (grandson); Griffin Newman (grandson); Romilly Newman (granddaughter); Peter Newman (son-in-law)

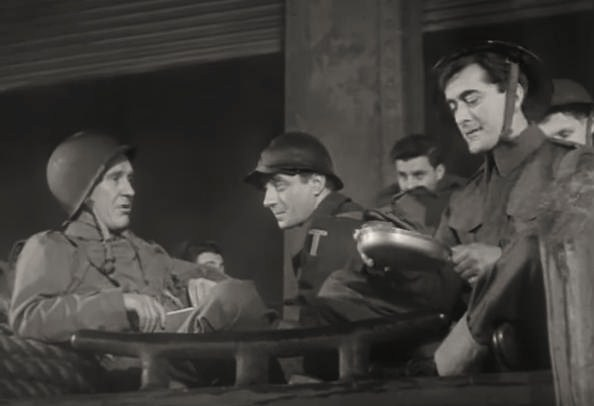
L-R: Burgess Meredith, Claude Dauphin & Philip Bourneuf in A Salute to France (1944)

Claude Dauphin (né Legrand; 19 August 1903 – 16 November 1978) was a French actor. He appeared in more than 130 films between 1930 and 1978, including Barbarella, The Quiet American, The Tenant, Grand Prix and a voice role in The Tale of the Fox, considered to be one of the earliest stop-motion animated films.

== Biography ==
He was born in Corbeil-Essonnes, Essonne. His father was Maurice Étienne Legrand, a poet who wrote as Franc-Nohain, and who was the librettist for Maurice Ravel's opera L'heure espagnole. His elder brother was the writer Jean Nohain.

Dauphin's debut on film came in La Vagabonde (1930). He debuted on stage in Chapeau Chinois (1930) in Paris.

== Personal life ==
Dauphin married three times: first to Rosine Derean, then to the actress Maria Mauban with whom he had a child, Jean-Claude Dauphin, also an actor. Eventually, in 1955, Dauphin married American actress Norma Eberhardt. The couple divided their time between Paris, Los Angeles, New York City and Ocean Township, New Jersey. They remained together until Dauphin's death in Paris in 1978.

== Selected filmography ==
- A Tale of the Fox (1930) - Monkey (voice)
- Tout s'arrange (1931) - Émile
- The Fortune (1931) - Joannis
- To the Polls, Citizens (1932) - René Faradin
- Une jeune fille et un million (1932) - Bobby
- Moonlight (1932) - Jacques
- A Happy Man (1932) - Claude Moreuil
- Paris-Soleil (1933) - Fernand
- La Fille du régiment (1933) - Lieutenant Williams
- Le Rayon des amours (1933) - André
- Boubouroche (1933) - André
- The Abbot Constantine (1933) - Paul de Laverdens
- D'amour et d'eau fraîche (1933) - Andre
- Les Surprises du sleeping (1933) - Prince Philippe
- Pas besoin d'argent (1933) - Paul
- Nous ne sommes plus des enfants (1934) - Jean Servin
- Dédé (1935) - André 'Dédé' de la Huchette
- The Slipper Episode (1935) - André Chabrolles
- Le Billet de mille (1935) - Le neveu
- Return to Paradise (1935) - Robert Ginet
- The Happy Road (1936) - Paul Venieri
- Let's Make a Dream (1936) - Un invité
- The Pearls of the Crown (1937) - Le prisonnier italien en Abyssinie
- The Tale of the Fox (1937) - Robert Grésillon
- The Curtain Rises (1938) - François Polti
- Conflit (1938) - Gérard
- The World Will Tremble (1939) - Docteur Jean Durand
- Radio Surprises (1940) - Himself
- Cavalcade d'amour (1940) - Léandre, Hubert & Georges
- Beating Heart (1940) - Léandre, Hubert & Georges
- Paris-New York (1940) - Paul Landry
- Strange Suzy (1941) - Jacques Hébert
- Promise to a Stranger (1942) - Jean Cartier
- Les Hommes sans peur (1942) - Henri Vermont
- Les Petits Riens (1942) - Drial (uncredited)
- The Beautiful Adventure (1942) - Valentin Le Barroyer
- A Woman in the Night (1943) - François Rousseau
- Les Deux Timides (1943) - Jules Frémissin
- Une femme disparaît (1944)
- English Without Tears (1944) - François de Freycinet
- Felicie Nanteuil (1944) - Aimé Cavalier
- Dorothy Looks for Love (1945) - Robert
- Une femme coupée en morceaux (1946)
- Tombé du ciel (1946) - Maurice
- Cyrano de Bergerac (1946) - Cyrano de Bergerac
- We Are Not Married (1946) - Fernand
- Paris 1900 (1947) - Robert Chesnay aka Michel Trévines
- Naughty Martine (1947) - Jacques Brévannes
- Rendezvous in Paris (1947) - Robert Chesnay
- Van Gogh (1948) - Narrator (voice)
- Route sans issue (1948) - Jacques Audoin
- Parade du rire (1948) - M. de la Bergère
- Impeccable Henri (1948) - Henri, le majordome
- Croisière pour l'inconnu (1948) - Clément Fournil
- Jean de la Lune (1949) - Jeff, un marchand de fleurs follement amoureux de Marceline ("a flower seller madly in love with Marceline")
- Le Bal des pompiers (1949) - Camille, Olivier and Henri Grégeois
- L'Inconnu d'un soir (1949) - Harry Belmont
- Ainsi finit la nuit (1949) - Le pianiste André Fuger
- The Chocolate Girl (1950) - Paul Normand
- Deported (1950) - Vito Bucelli
- Le Plaisir (1952) - Le docteur (segment "Le Masque")
- Casque d'or (1952) - Félix Leca
- Adorable Creatures (1952) - Récitant / Narrator (voice)
- April in Paris (1952) - Philippe Fouquet
- Innocents in Paris (1953) - Max de Lonne
- Little Boy Lost (1953) - Pierre Verdier
- Les Trois Mousquetaires (1953) - Commentant le film par la voix de (voice)
- Phantom of the Rue Morgue (1954) - Inspector Bonnard
- Les mauvaises rencontres (1955) - Le docteur Jacques Daniéli
- G.E. Summer Originals (TV series, 1956) Episode "The Green Parrot" (unsold television pilot)
- Paris, Palace Hôtel (1956) - Le récitant / Narrator (voice, uncredited)
- The Quiet American (1958) - Inspector Vigot
- Mon coquin de père (1958) - Jean Servin
- Pourquoi viens-tu si tard? (1959) - René Dargillière
- Alfred Hitchcock Presents (1960) (Season 5 Episode 19: "Not the Running Type") - Co-host
- The Full Treatment (1960) - David Prade
- Tiara Tahiti (1962) - Henri Farengue
- Le Diable et les Dix Commandements (1962) - Georges Beaufort (segment "Luxurieux point ne seras")
- Symphonie pour un massacre (1963) - Valoti
- La Bonne Soupe (1964) - M. Oscar
- The Visit (1964) - Bardick
- Compartiment tueurs (1965) - Le frère d'Eliane (uncredited)
- Lady L (1965) - Inspector Mercier
- Is Paris Burning? (1966) - Colonel Lebel
- Grand Prix (1966) - Hugo Simon
- Da Berlino l'apocalisse (1967) - Lasalle
- Two for the Road (1967) - Maurice Dalbret
- Lamiel (1967) - Le marquis d'Orpiez
- L'une et l'autre (1967) - Serebriakov
- Hamilchama al hashalom (1968 documentary) - Narrator
- Adolphe ou l'Âge tendre (1968) - Monsieur Rebecque
- Barbarella (1968) - President of Earth
- Hard Contract (1969) - Maurice
- The Madwoman of Chaillot (1969) - Dr. Jadin
- Églantine (1972) - Clément
- La più bella serata della mia vita (1972) - Cancelliere Bouisson
- Au rendez-vous de la mort joyeuse (1973) - Father D'Aval
- Vogliamo i colonnelli (1973) - The President of the Italian Republic
- Vogue la galère (1973) - Le capitaine
- L'important c'est d'aimer (1975) - Mazelli
- Rosebud (1975) - Fargeau
- La Course à l'échalote (1975) - De Rovère
- The Tenant (1976) - Husband at the accident
- Mado (1976) - Vaudable
- The Anchorite (1976) - Boswell
- Le Point de mire (1977) - Maître Leroy
- Madame Rosa (1977) - Docteur Katz
- Le Pion (1978) - Albert Carraud
- Les Misérables (1978, TV Movie) - Bishop Myriel
