= The Unknown Singer (1947 film) =

1947 film

- Directed by: André Cayatte
- Written by: Louis Chavance; Henri Diamant-Berger; André Tabet
- Produced by: Charles Smadja
- Starring: Tino Rossi; Lilia Vetti; Maria Mauban
- Cinematography: André Thomas
- Edited by: Christian Gaudin
- Music by: Raymond Legrand
- Production company: Gray-Film
- Distributed by: Gray-Film
- Release date: 25 April 1947
- Running time: 90 minutes
- Country: France
- Language: French

The Unknown Singer (French: Le chanteur inconnu) is a 1947 French musical drama film directed by André Cayatte and starring Tino Rossi, Lilia Vetti and Maria Mauban. It is a remake of the 1931 film of the same title. Filming took place at the Pathé studios in Paris and on location at the Opéra de Monte-Carlo in Monaco. The film's sets were designed by the art directors Léon Barsacq and Robert-Jules Garnier.

== Synopsis ==
In a village on the coast of Portugal a fisherman with a superb natural singing voice is discovered by a French visitor and persuaded to try a career in Paris. He enjoys growing success but one night before he is due to perform at the opera in Monaco he is attacked. It brings back his lost memory. He had once been a successful singer before a murder attempt on his life.

== Cast ==
- Tino Rossi as Julien Mortal / Paolo
- Lilia Vetti as Louise
- Maria Mauban as Renée
- Charles Dechamps as Max Daroult, le directeur de la radio
- Raymond Bussières as Fernand, Juliens Manager
- Lucien Nat as Carray Mas
- Madeleine Suffel as La bonne
- Jacqueline Dumonceau as La journaliste
- Erico Braga as L'aubergiste
- Lucien Callamand as Le régisseur
- Marcel Carpentier as La basse
- Espanita Cortez
- Albert Duvaleix as Le marchand de disques
- Gustave Gallet as Le directeur de l'opéra
- Marie Guilhène
- Suzanne Guémard as Une dame
- Pierre Labry as Le machiniste
- Ray Postiaux as La vendeuse
- Marcelle Rexiane as La tante
- Jean-Marc Tennberg

== Bibliography ==
- Hugh Dauncey. Popular Music in France from Chanson to Techno. Routledge, 2017.
