= James Newman (actor) =

American actor

James Milo Newman
- Born: James Myron Newman; January 22, 1992 (age 34); New York City, U.S.
- Occupations: actor; sports executive
- Years active: 2011
- Relatives: Peter Newman (father); Romilly Newman (sister); Griffin Newman (brother); Claude Dauphin (maternal grandfather); J. D. Beresford (maternal step-great-grandfather)

James Milo Newman (born James Myron Newman; January 22, 1992) is an American former actor and current sports executive. He played Tony Snyder on the US MTV television teen drama Skins. Newman's first acting experience was auditioning for Skins. He had previously planned to fight in the Golden Gloves boxing tournament (he had once boxed with Yuri Foreman).

After ending his acting career, Newman became a sports executive, notably as general manager of Paris Basketball. In 2025, he was appointed general manager of the Sydney Kings.

== Personal life ==
Newman was raised in Greenwich Village, New York. He is the son of actress Antonia Beresford Dauphin and producer Peter Ross Newman. His maternal grandmother, Ruda Dauphin (née Podemska), was the president of film production company Odeon International.

His maternal step-grandfather was English novelist Marc Brandel, the son of writer J. D. Beresford. His parents had a Jewish wedding. His brother is actor Griffin Newman.

== Filmography ==
- Skins: Reverse Party (2011) (Tony Snyder)
- Skins Webisodes (2011) (Tony Snyder) (4 episodes)
- Skins (2011) (Tony Snyder) (10 episodes)

== Basketball executive ==
During the 2020s, Newman served as general manager of Paris Basketball.

In November 2025, Newman was appointed general manager of the Sydney Kings of the Australian National Basketball League.
