= Griffin Newman =

American actor and comedian (born 1989)

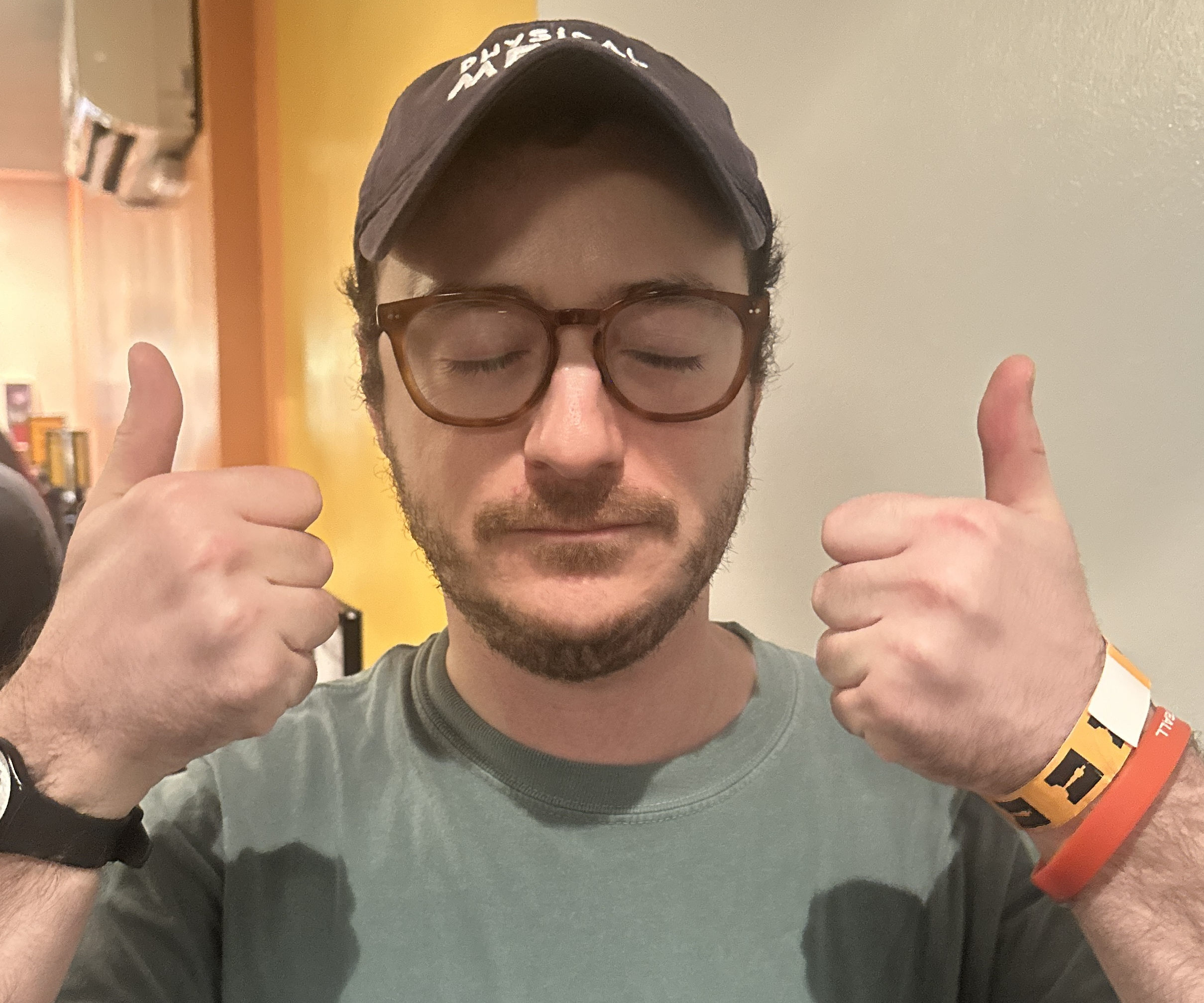
- Newman in 2025
- Born: February 19, 1989 (age 37)
- Education: Saint Ann's School
- Occupations: Actor; comedian
- Years active: 2006–present
- Relatives: Peter Newman (father); James Newman (brother); Romilly Newman (sister); Claude Dauphin (maternal grandfather)

Griffin Newman (born February 19, 1989) is an American actor and comedian.

He is known for starring as Arthur Everest in the Amazon Studios television series The Tick (2016–2019), as the voice of Orko in the Netflix animated series Masters of the Universe: Revelation (2021, 2024), cohosting the film podcast Blank Check with Griffin & David alongside critic David Sims, and for acting as cohost and sidekick Watto on The George Lucas Talk Show.

== Early life ==
Newman is the son of film producer Peter Newman and casting director Antonia Dauphin. His maternal grandfather, Claude Dauphin, was a French actor. His younger brother, James Newman, is also an actor. His maternal step grandfather was English novelist Marc Brandel, the son of writer J. D. Beresford. His parents had a Jewish wedding. Newman was raised in Greenwich Village, and attended Saint Ann's School. He was interested in performing from an early age, often performing Fozzie Bear routines for friends and family. He started stand-up comedy at the age of ten as part of the 'Kidsncomedy' program run by Jo Ann Grossman. His material was mostly political, workshopped with his father. He began getting some attention from agents at this time, though his parents were reluctant for him to pursue a career in acting. His first onscreen appearance was as 'Teenage Fan' in the mockumentary The Buried Secret of M. Night Shyamalan. His role was mostly cut from the film. As a teenager, Newman regularly attended Buck's Rock Performing and Creative Arts Camp.

Newman started college in 2007 at California Institute of the Arts with the intention of becoming a filmmaker. He dropped out after seven months to pursue a career in comedy and acting.

== Career ==
Newman's first major onscreen appearance is in the film The Treatment in 2006 as high school student Scott. He went on to play roles in a number of shorts and student films. He also began performing stand-up regularly around this time and produced a one-man show titled Grifftopia, which he performed in 2009 and 2010.

In 2010, Newman appeared in the teen film Beware the Gonzo in the role of Horny Rob Becker, one of the friends of the titular Gonzo (Ezra Miller). Though the film was released to mixed reviews, Newman's performance was positively reviewed, with Odie Henderson from RogerEbert.com writing that "Becker is the most interesting character in the film."

Over the next few years, Newman guest starred in a number of television shows, including Blue Bloods, Big Lake, and Law & Order: Special Victims Unit, as well as appearing in sketches for Funny or Die. He played the role of Russ in the television mini-series Political Animals for the USA Network, and was listed by Just for Laughs as one of the 2012 New Faces of Comedy: Characters.

In 2013, Newman was cast in John Mulaney's sitcom Mulaney for NBC as Seymour. The network passed on the show after shooting the pilot, but later in the year, it was picked up by Fox with the role of Seymour cut from the script. Newman has described the situation as his own version of the Dark Phoenix saga.

Later that year, Newman became a correspondent for Nikki & Sara Live, and began making regular appearances on The Chris Gethard Show. Alongside Riley Soloner, he hosted the podcast Talking TCGS from 2013 to 2014. He hosted The Awooga Comedy Hour with Andrew Tavin from January 2013, a live comedy show that became weekly from May 2014.

In 2014, Newman appeared in the film Draft Day as Rick the Intern alongside Kevin Costner, and later that year announced he had become a part of a Maude Team at UCB. He went on to have supporting roles in other feature films including Fort Tilden, Free The Nipple, and Naomi and Ely's No Kiss List.

Newman has appeared in a number of webseries, including Snarky Sidekick and The Untitled Web Series That Morgan Evans Is Doing for MTV; he starred as the Director in Colin Quinn's webseries Cop Show for all three seasons.

With critic David Sims, Newman started The Phantom Podcast in March 2015, a podcast dedicated to analysing the film The Phantom Menace as though it was the only film in the Star Wars franchise. The show went on to discuss the other Star Wars films before being retitled Blank Check with Griffin & David and establishing its new premise. The podcast involves Sims, Newman, and sometimes a guest, discussing filmographies of directors who have had massive success early on in their career which has enabled them to be given free rein to make large scale passion projects. The podcast has received praise from critics.

In 2016 Newman had a supporting role in the HBO series Vinyl, and guest starred in the sitcoms Search Party and Difficult People. Later that year, it was announced Newman would be playing Arthur Everest in Amazon Video's new reboot of The Tick alongside Peter Serafinowicz in the titular role. The pilot, directed by Wally Pfister, was released on August 18, 2016. The show was picked up for a first season in September 2016. The first six episodes of the first season were released on August 25, 2017. The remaining six episodes of the first season were released on February 23, 2018. On January 17, 2018, Amazon ordered a second season of 10 episodes, which premiered in 2019. Newman has received critical acclaim for his portrayal of Everest. In May 2019, Amazon Studios announced that the show would not return for a third season.

Newman has a small role in Woody Allen's film A Rainy Day in New York, previously set for release in 2018. In October 2017, Newman made a statement via his Twitter expressing his regret at taking the role in the film, due to the allegations of sexual abuse against Allen. He announced he would be donating his salary from the film to RAINN.

Premiering in February 2018, Showtime's animated series Our Cartoon President features Newman as the voice of Jared Kushner.

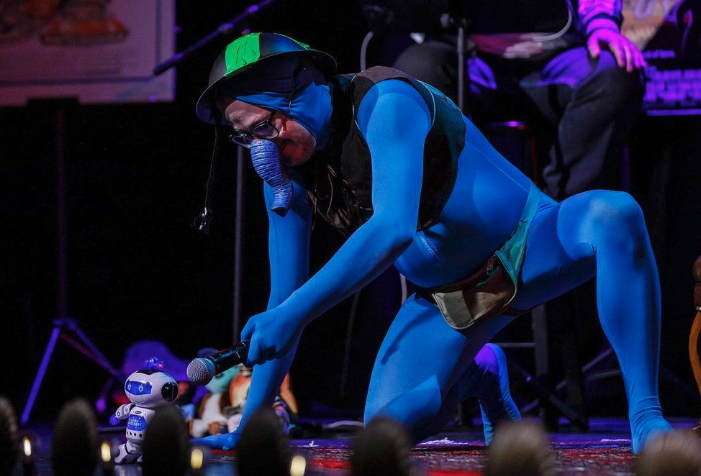
Newman as Watto

Newman regularly appears as part of Connor Ratliff's The George Lucas Talk Show at UCB, as Watto. After the UCB theater closed down due to the COVID-19 pandemic, Ratliff, Newman and their UCB producer Patrick Cotnoir started doing weekly regular episodes and charity marathon livestream versions of the show on the streaming network Planet Scum Live. The charity livestreams have raised over $100,000 for various charities while marathoning through TV shows like Arli$$, Big Lake and Studio 60 on the Sunset Strip.

In February 2020, Newman was announced as the voice of Orko in the Netflix series Masters of the Universe: Revelation after campaigning online for the role when the show was first announced.

== Filmography ==
=== Film ===
Year	Title	Role	Notes	Ref.
2006	The Treatment	Scott		
2010	Beware the Gonzo	Horny Rob Becker		
2013	Beneath	Zeke		
2013	Night Moves	Middle Manager		
2014	Fort Tilden	Sam		
2014	Draft Day	Rick		
2014	Buttwhistle	Fenwick		
2014	The Fly Room	Jack		
2014	Free the Nipple	Orson		
2015	Naomi and Ely's No Kiss List	Bruce 1		
2015	You, Your Brain, and You	#69		
2016	Bakery in Brooklyn	Ian		
2017	Inside You	Gabe		
2018	Hot Air	Tyler		
2019	A Rainy Day in New York	Josh Loomis		
2022	Disenchanted	Pip	Voice	
2024	Pavements	Steve West		
2024	Turn Me On	Frank		
2025	The Dinner Plan	Henry		
2025	Drink and Be Merry	Tony		
2026	Resident Evil	Wade		

=== Television ===
Year	Title	Role	Notes	Ref.
2009	Possible Side Effects	Amos	Television film	
2009	A NY Thing	Boyfriend	Television film	
2010	Gravity	Jack	4 episodes	
2010	Big Lake	Bryce	Episode: "Chris Falls in Love"	
2011	Law & Order: Special Victims Unit	Kev	Episode: "Russian Brides"	
2011	Blue Bloods	Sam Johnson	2 episodes	
2012	Political Animals	Russ	4 episodes	
2013	Magic Eye Shark Movie	Josh	5 episodes	
2013	Paynt Boyz	Blaid	4 episodes	
2013	The Surgeon General	Ted Sheldon	Television film	
2014	Taxi Brooklyn	Damon Flack	Episode: "Brooklyn Heights"	
2015	Graceland	Crayton Windgate	Episode: "Sense Memory"	
2015–2016	Cop Show	Director	25 episodes	
2016	Vinyl	Casper	10 episodes	
2016	Difficult People	Kevin	Episode: "Hashtag Cats"	
2016	Thanksgiving	Michael Morgan	8 episodes	
2016–2019	The Tick	Arthur Everest	22 episodes	
2016–2022	Search Party	Gavin Rolf	3 episodes	
2017	Saving a Legend	Luke Davidson	Television film	
2018–2020	Our Cartoon President	Jared Kushner	Voice, 23 episodes	
2019	Supergirl	Trivia Night Host	Episode: "Crisis on Infinite Earths: Part One"	
2020	The Iliza Shlesinger Sketch Show	Greg	Episode #1.6	
2020	The Shivering Truth	Fred Lombadi	Voice, episode: "Beast of Both Worlds"	
2020–2022	Dicktown	Lance	Voice, 3 episodes	
2020–present	The George Lucas Talk Show	Watto	Cohost	
2021	Cinema Toast	Herbie	Voice, episode: "Report on the Canine Auto-Mechanical Soviet Threat"	
2021–2022	Movie Trivia Schmoedown	"Downtown" Griffy Newms		
2021–2024	Masters of the Universe	Orko, Tuvar	Voice, 10 episodes	
2022	Harley Quinn	Mad Hatter	Voice, episode: "Another Sharkley Adventure"	
2023	Scott Pilgrim Takes Off	Actor in the movie within the show / Butler / Valet	Voice, 5 episodes	
2026	The Muppet Show	Audience Member	TV special; uncredited	
2026	Strip Law	Dilterton Timble	Voice, episode: "We Need to Talk About Heaven"	
