= The Wombles =

British children's book fictional characters

- One of the Wombles, Bungo, in UK television series The Wombles
- Author: Elisabeth Beresford
- Illustrator: Margaret Gordon (initial book illustrations)
- Country: United Kingdom
- Genre: Children's literature
- Publisher: Puffin Books
- Published: 1968–1976
- Media type: Print, audiobook
- No. of books: 6

The Wombles are fictional pointy-nosed, furry creatures created by Elisabeth Beresford and originally appearing in a series of children's novels from 1968. They live in burrows, where they aim to help the environment by collecting and recycling rubbish in creative and extraordinary ways. Although Wombles supposedly live in every country in the world, Beresford's stories are primarily concerned with the lives of the inhabitants of the burrow on Wimbledon Common in London, England.

The characters gained a higher national profile in the UK in the mid-1970s as a result of the popularity of a BBC-commissioned children's television show which used stop-motion animation. A number of spin-off novelty songs also became hits in the British music charts. The Wombles pop group was the idea of British singer and composer Mike Batt.

The Womble motto is "Make Good Use of Bad Rubbish". This environmentally friendly message was a reflection of the growing environmental movement of the 1970s.

== Background ==
Elisabeth Beresford took her young children for a Boxing Day walk on Wimbledon Common, where her daughter Kate repeatedly mispronounced it as "Wombledon Common", sparking the idea of the Wombles in her mother's mind. On getting home, Beresford wrote down the idea and started developing the characters and storylines. She developed most of her Womble characters around members of her family, and named them after places the family had associations with.

== Plot aspects ==
=== Physical characteristics ===
Wombles are essentially burrowing animals. Beresford's original book describes them as "a bit like teddy bears to look at but they have real claws and live beneath Wimbledon Common". As they mostly live in long-established burrows, they rarely use their claws, even for digging. Their size and physical appearance has changed somewhat over the years: in the original editions of the books, Wombles are pictured as bear-like and between 3 and 5 feet (about 1–1.5 metres) in height, making them only slightly smaller than adult humans. This changed with the TV series, in which they were portrayed as being about knee-high to humans, with pointy snouts like those of hedgehogs. In the book and film Wombling Free, they are described as "short, fat, and furry", roughly between three or four feet (about 1 metre) in height.

Wombles are herbivores and are very fond of mushrooms. They eat a variety of plants, fungi, and tree products that human beings cannot (or will not) eat, so daisy buns, moss pie, acorn juice, fir-cone soufflé, elm bark casserole, and grass bread sandwiches are part of the Womble menu – augmented by any food left behind on the Common by human beings. All Wombles are strong swimmers and can even survive for long periods in ice-cold water. Several sub-species of Womble are revealed throughout the books: the Loch Ness Monster is actually part of a clan of water Wombles and the yeti of the Himalayas are giant snow-white Wombles. Wombles have a sixth sense that allows them to sense green spaces and wildlife: this is first mentioned in the Wandering Wombles but developed to a keen long-range telepathic sense by Dalai Gartok Womble in The Wombles Go Round The World.

=== Culture and society ===
Though it is stated that Wombles live all around the world, Beresford's collection of stories, as well as the television series and the music, focus on a group living in Wimbledon Common in London, England, with the sole exception of The Wombles Go Round The World.

Wombles care for and educate their young at a communal level. As with human children, immature Wombles are taught reading, writing and athletic skills, which they learn by playing a game called "Wombles and Ladders". Some older Wombles play this game too, though most regard it as childish. Below a certain (unspecified) age, all Wombles are nameless; upon being deemed to be of working age, a Womble chooses his or her name by looking through Great Uncle Bulgaria's large atlas until they find a name that suits them. Some, Bungo for example, "merely shut their eyes tight and point and hope for the best". They then leave Miss Adelaide's "Womblegarten" and join in the communal work of the burrow, which is mostly clearing up and recycling human refuse.

Wombles are very careful to keep their existence secret from human beings – at least in the books and TV series – fearing that discovery of their existence will lead to the Great Womble Hunt. For the most part, adult human beings rarely take notice of them, or fail to distinguish them from humans. In the film Wombling Free this is reversed as the Wombles seek to get humans to listen to their pleas to "make good use of bad rubbish".

Wombles generally have a low opinion of other animal species, though they are never unkind to them. They have a poor opinion of humans in general, though there are exceptions, such as royalty, especially the Queen. They also have a respect for human literature; the Wimbledon Wombles maintain a large library of books left by humans on the Common, and Great Uncle Bulgaria is fond of reading The Times.

== Production ==
=== Children's novels ===
There were five novels and a short story collection:

1. The Wombles (1968)
2. The Wandering Wombles (1970)
3. The Wombles at Work (1973)
4. The Invisible Womble and Other Stories (1973)
5. The Wombles to the Rescue (1974)
6. The Wombles Go Round the World (1976)

All of these were out of print for many years until they were republished by Bloomsbury, from 2010 to 2011, along with the 1973 short-story collection The Invisible Womble, with all-new illustrations by Nick Price. In The Wandering Wombles, the setting moved from Wimbledon Common to Hyde Park in central London, but The Wombles to the Rescue saw them return to Wimbledon Common.

Four of the books were illustrated by Margaret Gordon. The Wombles at Work (1973) was illustrated by Barry Leith, who worked on set design for the original FilmFair series. The Wandering Wombles (1970) was illustrated by Oliver Chadwick. The appearance of the Wombles in the books followed the design of the Ivor Wood TV puppets, with the exception of original editions of The Wombles (1968) and first printings of The Wandering Wombles, which preceded the TV series and depicted the Wombles as teddy bear-like creatures. When the 1973 animated Wombles series was in pre-production, a decision was made to change the design of the characters so that they did not resemble teddy bears, as it was felt that there were too many children's shows with teddy bear characters. There is a reference in the first book to dark brown being the colour of their fur (with the exception of the oldest Wombles whose fur turns white) but this was changed to silvery grey, save for the neck, which is black. Some of the toys and book illustrations do not show the black fur on the neck.

There is an audiobook of The Wombles, narrated by Bernard Cribbins, with the other novels narrated by Jamie Demetriou.

Beresford wrote a collection of short stories entitled The Invisible Womble and Other Stories (1973); these stories were based on episodes from the TV series, although they occasionally refer to events in the novels.

In addition to these books, many annuals, picture books and children's early readers have been published over the years, some of which were also written by Beresford.

=== Television ===
A stop-motion animated series of five-minute episodes was made between 1973 and 1975, along with two half-hour specials. Narration and all Womble voices for these were provided by Bernard Cribbins.

Further animated episodes, using new animation models and sets, were made by Cinar/Filmfair in 1998–1999. These were ten minutes long and had several Canadian actors provide the voices. Background music was adapted from the Wombles' records along with new compositions.

A CGI animated series of 52 episodes, under the guidance of Mike Batt's Dramatico Productions, who bought the rights to the Wombles for Channel 5's preschool slot Milkshake!, was intended for airing in 2015. Ray Winstone and Cribbins were confirmed as the voices of this new series. Only two of the planned episodes were screened, however, at the Cambridge Film Festival in November 2016. Batt filed for bankruptcy the following year in September, and resigned as director of Dramatico Productions.

=== Music ===
Songwriter and producer Mike Batt wrote the series' theme tune, but negotiated the musical rights to the characters in place of the traditional composer's fee. To promote the Wombles' first single, he had his mother make him a Womble costume, which he wore for most of the working week. After the Wombles' first chart hit, he went on to perform and produce a number of successful novelty singles as The Wombles in the 1970s. They amassed eight Top 40 singles in the UK and reached No. 55 on the US Billboard Hot 100 chart with 1974's, "Wombling Summer Party" single on Columbia Records. They were awarded the Music Week Award for Top Singles Band of 1974. Reissues of the Wombles' music in the late 1990s and early 2000s also charted, extending their number of UK chart hits to thirteen.

=== Merchandise ===
Stop-motion animation is an expensive means of making a programme, due to the amount of time required. Animation production houses used to rely on international sales of their productions to cover costs, and merchandising was once considered a welcome bonus. Rising labour and production costs, however, have made merchandising a necessary revenue stream for any new programme. The Wombles TV series had originally been commissioned because of the popularity of the stories on UK children's TV programme Jackanory, with little thought given to merchandising, so the Wombles' initial merchandising was conducted in a haphazard way. Following the overwhelming success of merchandising for the Star Wars franchise, merchandising became the prime driver of and precursor to new productions. Prior to Star Wars, the story had come first and its popularity led to the commissioning of a TV series, followed by merchandise. After Star Wars, the situation reversed itself, and toy design came first. Demand for Wombles merchandise in the UK was driven by the popularity of the TV programme and books, but there were restrictions on toy advertising in the UK that kept TV merchandising in check.

The Wombles were merchandised in the UK, Australia, and New Zealand. Products include stuffed toys along with stationery, stickers, small figurines, bath soap, night lights, lamp shades, chocolate bars, gelatin pudding kits, posters, games, shirts, badges (buttons), cloth patches, and other items. The revival of the series in the late 1990s brought with it another wave of merchandise which included lunch boxes, umbrellas, flannels (face cloths), hot water bottle covers, slippers, a Steiff doll, and a set of postage stamps for Alderney, a Channel Island that served as the name for one of the Wombles and the home of Beresford until her death. More recently, the Wombles were part of a set of UK postage stamps honouring classic British children's TV programmes. In 2013, Mike Batt and Elisabeth Beresford's two children consolidated the merchandising copyrights to the Wombles in a new company, Wombles Copyright Holdings, of which Batt became the principal shareholder with creative control held by Beresford's heirs. This included the purchase of the Wombles TV series from DHX Media, who had acquired it with their purchase of Cookie Jar Entertainment in 2012.

=== Film ===
A feature-length live-action movie Wombling Free was released in 1977, written and directed by Lionel Jeffries and starring The Wombles, David Tomlinson, Frances de la Tour and Bonnie Langford. A soundtrack album was released in 1978. A region 2 DVD of the film was released by Network in 2006, containing the film in its theatrical aspect ratio, the original theatrical trailer, and archive interviews with Jeffries, Tomlinson and Langford.

=== Other appearances ===
A feral pack of Wombles appeared in BBC comedy series The Goodies in the episode "The Goodies Rule – O.K.?", engaging in a fierce wrestling match with Bill Oddie.

In 2011, The Wombles performed live at Glastonbury.

The Wombles were the interval entertainment at Eurovision Song Contest 1974.

=== Sport ===
Haydon the Womble, mascot of AFC Wimbledon.

Due to the Wombles' association with the area, some local sporting teams representing Wimbledon are sometimes affectionately nicknamed "the Wombles". These teams include the Ladies side of Wimbledon RFC, whose mascot is "Alderney", the Wimbledon Volleyball Club, and the Wombles Netball Club.

From 2000 to June 2003, Wimbledon F.C. used a Womble named "Wandle" as a club mascot, named after the local River Wandle. After the 2002 relocation of the club to Milton Keynes, the licence to use the character was not renewed beyond June 2003. In 2006, the club's Wimbledon successor, AFC Wimbledon, made a licensing deal with Beresford and launched its own Womble mascot. After a naming competition in which the final name was chosen by Elisabeth Beresford herself, AFC Wimbledon announced that the new Womble would be known as "Haydon", after Haydons Road, the nearest railway station to Wimbledon's original home ground, Plough Lane. Twelve years later, the club announced plans to return to their original neighbourhood; Haydons Road is also the closest station to their new ground.

Beresford also gave permission for a team of Wombles to run the London Marathon.

=== Reboot ===
Altitude Television is working on a reboot with Will Davies writing a script for it.

== Characters ==
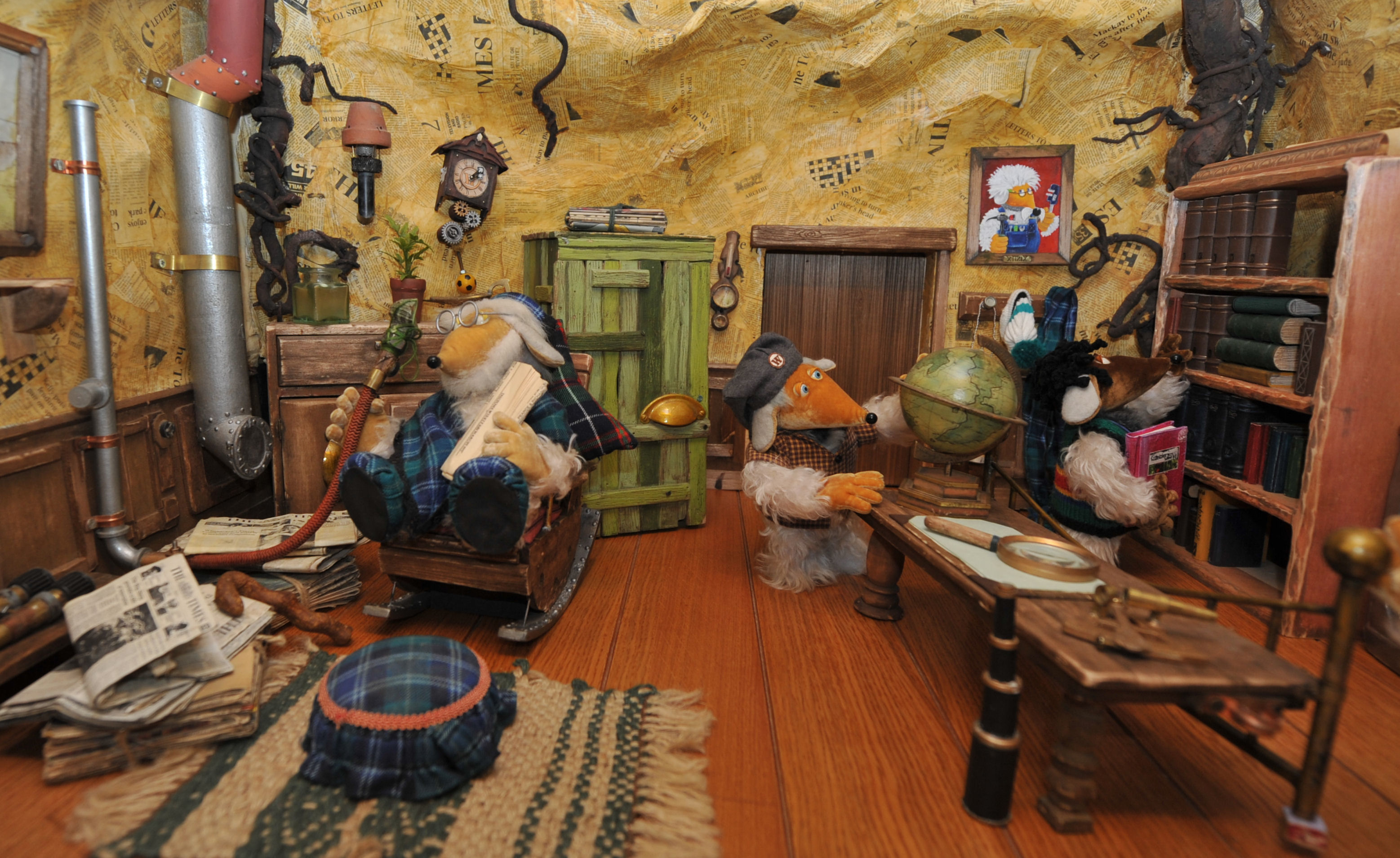
L-R Great Uncle Bulgaria, Bungo and Stepney (plus Tobermory the handyman in picture on wall), in one of the rooms in the burrow. Photo taken at National Media Museum, Bradford, UK.

- Great Uncle Bulgaria Coburg – the oldest and wisest of the Wimbledon Wombles and their leader. He is based on Beresford's father-in-law and named after the country and the German city, respectively. He occasionally frightens the younger Wombles with his stern demeanour (and particularly his habit of glaring at them through two pairs of spectacles) but is actually very kind. He is over 300 years old by the final book.
- Tobermory – an engineer, based on Beresford's brother, a skilled inventor, and named after the capital of the Isle of Mull, in the Scottish Inner Hebrides. He has a gruff and surly manner but like Bulgaria (with whom he has been friends for many years) he has a very kindly heart.
- Orinoco – a shirker who loves sleep and food, styled on Beresford's teenage son and named after the river in South America. Though lazy and slothful by nature, Orinoco is resourceful and always means well, and is capable of some surprising acts of moral and physical courage.
- Bungo – over-enthusiastic and bossy, named after the province of Bungo in Japan. He is Orinoco's best friend and based on Beresford's daughter.
- Tomsk – an athletic but rather dim Womble, named after the city of Tomsk in Russia. He acts as the official "Nightwatch Womble" (and Daywatch Womble on occasion). He is an extremely keen golf player, and plays on the Wimbledon Common Golf Club course situated on the common, where human visitors have occasionally noted his talent for the sport. He is the largest and strongest of the Wimbledon Wombles.
- Wellington – scientifically inclined, but very insecure and absent-minded. Named after Beresford's nephew's school, Wellington School, Somerset, though Wellington himself later states that he chose his name from the city of Wellington in New Zealand.
- Madame Cholet – a very kind-hearted but short-tempered female Womble, and the cook of the Wimbledon burrow, styled on Beresford's mother and named after the town of Cholet in France. She affects a French accent, though she is actually no more French than any other Wimbledon Womble and simply likes to think of herself as French.
- Alderney – Madame Cholet's assistant, named after Alderney in the Channel Islands where Beresford lived towards the end of her life. She appeared in the early books, but was not in the first TV series. Her character was revived in the second TV series. She is a precocious young Womble with a slight disregard for the rules.

== Parodies ==
The Wombles are parodied (as Rumbles – haughty, rat-like creatures that can't pronounce their 'R's) in Michael de Larrabeiti's novel The Borribles. In 2008, the Wombles were satirised as the "Badass Wombles of Central Park" with the characters speaking in American accents as part of a campaign to encourage the production of more British-made children's television programmes.
