= The Fly (opera) =

Opera by Howard Shore

The Fly is an opera in two acts by Canadian composer Howard Shore, with a libretto by David Henry Hwang. It was commissioned by the Théâtre du Châtelet in Paris, France, where it premiered on 2 July 2008, and by Edgar Baitzel, then director of the Los Angeles Opera, where the opera was first performed on 7 September 2008. The work was broadcast by Radio France's station France Musique on 2 August 2008.

The opera is loosely based on David Cronenberg's 1986 film The Fly, which was based on the short story of the same name by George Langelaan. Shore also wrote the musically unrelated score of that film.

== Roles ==
Role	Voice type	Premiere cast, 2 July 2008 Conductor: Plácido Domingo
Seth Brundle (The Fly), scientist	bass-baritone	Daniel Okulitch
Veronica Quaife, journalist	mezzo-soprano	Ruxandra Donose
Stathis Borans, editor	tenor	David Curry in Paris; Gary Lehman in Los Angeles
Officer/Medical Analyst/Cheevers	mezzo-soprano	Beth Clayton
Marky	tenor	Jay Hunter Morris
Scientist #1	mezzo-soprano	Sophie van de Woestyne in Paris; Silvia Vasquez in Los Angeles
Scientist #2	baritone	Jean-Gabriel Saint-Martin in Paris; Nicholas Hartley in Los Angeles
Scientist #3	mezzo-soprano	Louise Callinan in Paris; Anna Jablonski in Los Angeles
Scientist #4	baritone	Frederic Goncalves in Paris; Matthew Moore in Los Angeles
Scientist #5	baritone	Luc Lalonde in Paris; Andrew Wilkowske in Los Angeles
Director		David Cronenberg
Set designer		Dante Ferretti
Costume designer		Denise Cronenberg
Lighting designer		A.J. Weissbard
Associate conductor/Chorus master		Grant Gershon
Makeup and creature design		Stephan L. Dupuis
Makeup, creature and puppet fabrication		Mark A. Rappaport's Creature Effects, Inc.

The opera runs approximately two hours.
