= The Misanthrope =

Comedy of manners by Molière

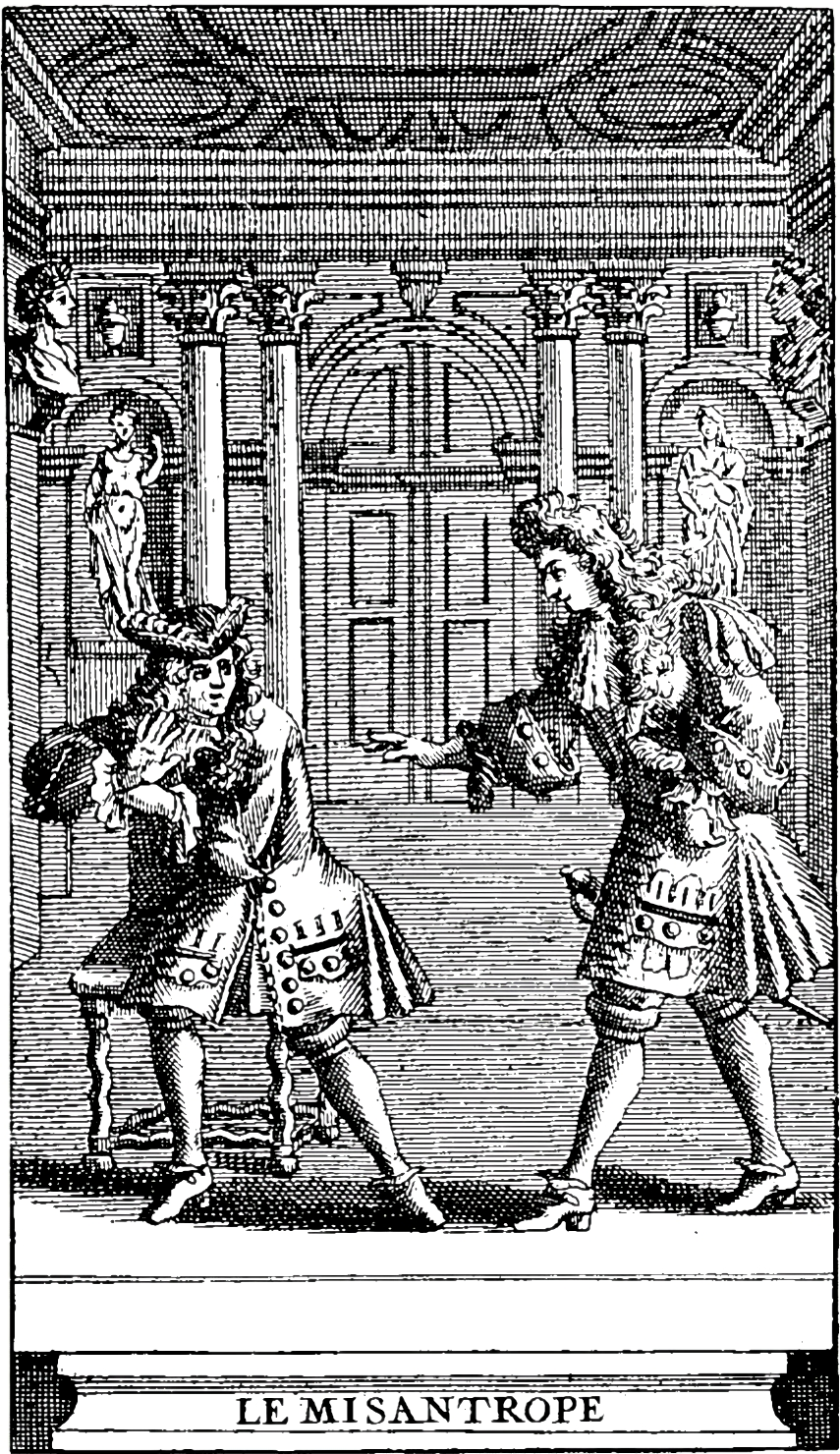
- Engraving from the 1719 edition
- Original language: French
- Written by: Molière
- Subject: Behavior of the aristocracy.
- Genre: Comedy
- Setting: Grand Siècle, France

Premiere
- Date: 4 June 1666
- Place: Théâtre du Palais-Royal, Paris

The Misanthrope, or the Cantankerous Lover (French: Le Misanthrope ou l'Atrabilaire amoureux; French pronunciation: [lə mizɑ̃tʁɔp u latʁabilɛːʁ amuʁø]) is a 17th-century comedy in verse written by Molière. It was first performed on 4 June 1666 at the Théâtre du Palais-Royal, Paris by the King's Players.

The play satirizes the hypocrisies of French aristocratic society, but it also engages a more serious tone when pointing out the flaws that afflict all humans. The play differs from other farces of the time by employing dynamic characters like Alceste and Célimène as opposed to the flat caricatures of traditional social satire. It also differs from most of Molière's other works by focusing more on character development and nuances than on plot progression. The play, though not a commercial success in its time, survives as Molière's best-known work today.

Because both Tartuffe and Don Juan, two of Molière's previous plays, had already been banned by the French government, Molière may have softened his ideas to make the play more socially acceptable. As a result, there is much ambiguity about whether the main character Alceste is intended as a hero for his uncompromising honesty, or as a quixotic fool. Molière has been the target of much criticism for The Misanthrope over the years. The French philosopher Jean-Jacques Rousseau claimed in his Letter to M. D'Alembert on Spectacles that it was Molière's best work, but hated that it made Alceste the butt of its humour. He believed the audience should support Alceste's high ideals rather than laugh at his misadventures.

== Characters and cast of premiere ==
- Alceste (first played by Molière): The protagonist and misanthrope of the title. He is quick to criticize the flaws of everyone around him, including himself. He cannot help but love Célimène though he loathes her behaviour.
- Célimène (first played by Armande Béjart-Molière): A young woman who is courted by Alceste, Oronte, Acaste, and Clitandre. She is playful and flirtatious and likes to point out the flaws of everyone she meets behind their backs. Célimène pays much attention to social appearances.
- Philinte (first played by La Grange): A polite man who genuinely cares for Alceste, and recognizes the importance of occasionally veiling one's true opinions in a social context. He is mainly thought of as Alceste's foil.
- Acaste (first played by André Hubert): A young, pompous marquis who believes he deserves Célimène's love.
- Oronte (first played by Marie Claveau): An outgoing, seemingly confident man who also loves Célimène for a time. His insecurity is revealed when he is unable to handle Alceste's criticism of his love sonnet.
- Arsinoé (first played by Mlle. de Brie): A highly moralistic older woman who is jealous of the attentions which Alceste pours onto Célimène.
- Éliante (first played by Marquise-Thérèse de Gorla): Love interest to Philinte and cousin to Célimène, who initially pines for Alceste. She possesses a good balance between societal conformity and individual expression.
- Clitandre (first played by La Thorillière): Another marquis who attempts to woo Célimène and win her love, and enjoys gossiping with her about notable social figures.
- Basque: Célimène's loyal manservant.
- Du Bois (first played by Louis Béjart): Alceste's farcically blundering manservant.
- Guard (likely first played by M. de Brie): A messenger of the Marshals of France who asks Alceste to answer for his criticism of Oronte's poetry.

== Synopsis ==
Much to the horror of his friends and companions, Alceste rejects la politesse, the social conventions of the 17th-century French ruelles (later called salons in the 18th century). His refusal to "make nice" makes him tremendously unpopular and he laments his isolation in a world he sees as superficial and base, saying early in Act I, "... Mankind has grown so base, / I mean to break with the whole human race."

Despite his convictions, however, Alceste cannot help but love the coquettish and playful Célimène, a consummate flirt whose wit and frivolity epitomize the courtly manners that Alceste despises. Though he constantly reprimands her, Célimène refuses to change, charging Alceste with being unfit for society because he hates humanity.

Despite his sour reputation as the misanthrope, Alceste does have women pining for him, particularly the prudish Arsinoé and the honest Éliante. Though he acknowledges their superior virtues, his heart still lies with Célimène. His deep feelings for her primarily serve to counter his negative expressions about mankind, since the fact that he has such feelings includes him amongst those he so fiercely criticizes.

When Alceste insults a sonnet written by the powerful noble Oronte, he is called to stand trial. Refusing to dole out false compliments, he is charged and humiliated and resolves on self-imposed exile.

Arsinoé, in trying to win his affection, shows him a love letter Célimène wrote to another suitor. He discovers that Célimène has been leading him on. She has written identical love letters to numerous suitors (including to Oronte) and broken her vow to favor him above all others. He gives her an ultimatum: he will forgive her and marry her if she runs away with him to exile. Célimène refuses, believing herself too young and beautiful to leave society and all her suitors behind. Philinte, for his part, becomes betrothed to Éliante. Alceste then decides to exile himself from society, and the play ends with Philinte and Éliante running off to convince him to return.

== Stage productions ==
There have been five known productions on Broadway:

- Richard Mansfield starred as Alceste in the very first Broadway production April 10–15, 1905 at the New Amsterdam Theatre.
- A production in French was performed at the Winter Garden Theatre February 7–9, 1957.
- Richard Easton starred as Alceste at the Lyceum Theatre October 9, 1968 - April 26, 1969 with Brian Bedford as Acaste, Christina Pickles as Celimene, Sydney Walker as Philinte, Keene Curtis as Oronte in a production directed by Stephen Porter using the Richard Wilbur translation.
- Alec McCowen starred as Alceste at the St. James Theatre March 12 - May 31, 1975 with Nicholas Clay as Acaste, Diana Rigg as Celimene and Robert Eddison as Philinte in a production directed by John Dexter using an adaptation by Tony Harrison. (This production was a transfer from the Old Vic, where it returned for an encore engagement after having in New York and Washington, D.C.)
- Brian Bedford returned to Broadway to star as Alceste at the Circle in the Square Theatre January 27 - March 27, 1983 with Carole Shelley as Arsinoe, Mary Beth Hurt as Celimene and Stanley Tucci as Dubois in a production directed by Stephen Porter using the Richard Wilbur translation.

The Misanthrope was first performed at the Stratford Festival in 1981. The most recent production ran from August 12 - October 29, 2011, at the Festival Theatre using the Richard Wilbur translation; Ben Carlson starred as Alceste and Sara Topham as Celimene. Brian Bedford was originally slated to direct and perform as Oronte but was forced to step down due to illness, so the production was directed instead by David Grindley.

A new adaptation of the play by Martin Crimp starring Sandra Oh opened at the Lyttelton Theatre on 16 June 2026 and is due to run to 1 August 2026.

== Sequel ==
In 1992, the playwright Jacques Rampal's sequel Célimène and the Cardinal was published, which – written in alexandrines – continues the story of Célimène and Alceste 20 years later. The play received three Molière Awards, France's highest theatre prize, in 1993. Well-known actresses such as Ludmila Mikaël (1992-1993) and Claude Jade (2006) played Célimène on French stages. The play has also been performed on English stages.

== Adaptations ==
German-Russian composer Zinaida Petrovna Ziberova composed a musical setting for The Misanthrope in 1934.

Modern adaptations of the play have been written by Tony Harrison and Liz Lochhead. Lochhead's version is set in the early years of the revived Scottish Parliament and satirises Scottish Labour's relationship with the media. Originally written in 1973, Harrison's version was updated and revived at the Bristol Old Vic in 2010.

A 1996 verse adaptation by Martin Crimp for the Young Vic updated the play to the "media-celebrity complex" of contemporary London. Uma Thurman and Roger Rees starred in a run of this version for Classic Stage Company in New York in 1999 directed by Barry Edelstein. and it was revived by Thea Sharrock at the Comedy Theatre, London starring Damian Lewis and Keira Knightley in December 2009.

Robert Cohen's 2006 translation into heroic couplets was praised by the Los Angeles Times as "highly entertaining... with a contemporary flavor full of colloquial yet literate pungency." Professor Cohen's version has been popular in productions staged by his former students, and it is the version staged by Keith Fowler in 2011 for UC Irvine's celebration of Cohen's fifty years at the university.

The Grouch, a more modern verse version of The Misanthrope by Ranjit Bolt was first performed at West Yorkshire Playhouse in February 2008. It is set in contemporary London, and most of the characters' names are recognisably linked to Molière's: in the sequence of the above cast list they are Alan, Celia, Phil, Eileen, Orville, Fay (Arsinoe), Lord Arne, Chris, and manservant Bates. Another adaptation by Roger McGough was premiered by the English Touring Theatre at the Liverpool Playhouse in February 2013 prior to a national tour – this adaptation is largely in verse, but has Alceste speaking in prose. In June 2014, Andy Clark, Rosalind Sydney and Helen MacKay appeared in a three-handed 50-minute version of The Misanthrope, written in rhyming couplets by Frances Poet, set and performed in the basement theatre of Glasgow's Òran Mór. The Scotsman noted "the sheer, sharp-edged wit of Poet's rhyming text, which pays perfect homage to the original, while diving boldly into the new world of fall-outs and friendships conducted on social media."

The School for Lies by David Ives (2011) was described by The New York Times as a "freewheeling rewrite of The Misanthrope". Justin Fleming has translated and adapted The Misanthrope in varied rhyme scheme with Alceste as a woman and Celimene as a young man for Bell Shakespeare Company and Griffin Theatre Company co-production in the Sydney Opera House Playhouse Theatre 2018.

The Misanthrope by Martin Crimp (2026) for the National Theatre is set in the present day. Alceste becomes Alice, a successful novelist famed for speaking her mind. Célimène becomes Stefan, a recovering alcoholic film actor.

== Audio ==
- in 1969, Caedmon Records recorded and released on LP a production originally performed that same year at the Lyceum Theatre in New York City using the Richard Wilbur translation and directed by Stephen Porter (see "Stage Productions" above). The cast included Richard Easton as Alceste, Ellis Rabb as Acaste, Keene Curtis as Oronte and Christina Pickles as Celimene.
- In 1997, L.A. Theatre Works performed and released a production using the Richard Wilbur translation (ISBN 1-58081-364-X) featuring Kevin Gudahl as Alceste, Hollis Resnick as Celimene and Larry Yando as Clintandre. A L.A. Theatre Works production starring Brian Bedford, recorded in 2012, was released in 2014.
