= Fanny Bastien =

French actress (born 1961)

- Born: Fanny Meunier; 13 December 1961 (age 64); Freiburg im Breisgau, Germany
- Occupation: Actress
- Years active: 1980–present

Fanny Bastien (née Meunier; born 13 December 1961 in Freiburg im Breisgau, Germany) is a French actress.

== Biography ==
At the age of 15, Bastien left home to study at a regional dance conservatory and, the following year, joined the Académie Fratellini. She later took acting classes by Véra Gregh, John Strasberg and Jack Waltzer. She began her acting career in 1980 under her birth name Fanny Meunier with a small role in Tendres Cousines, a soft-core erotic film by David Hamilton. Shen then portrayed a young pregnant high school student in the comedy Le bahut va craquer (1981) alongside Michel Galabru, Claude Jade, Darry Cowl and Dany Carrel. She later adopted the stage name Fanny Bastien and secured the lead role as the title character in the three-part television film Dorothée, danseuse de corde (1983), adapted from the novel of the same name by Maurice Leblanc about a young tightrope walker in a traveling circus.

Bastien acted regularly through the 1980s, often playing leading roles, navigating between auteur films and mainstream works alongside, among others, Gérard Jugnot, Richard Berry and Bernard Giraudeau, in the films Pinot simple flic, Urgence and Killing Time. Her screen appearances declined in the mid-1990s. However, she continues to act occasionally, including a secondary recurring role in the Canal+ series Braquo in 2009–2011 and in two episodes of the France 2 series Astrid et Raphaëlle in 2020.

Bastien presides over the Festival du Film Insolite in Rennes-le-Château, which she co-founded with Geoffroy Thiebaut in 2015.

== Filmography ==
=== Film ===
Year	Title	Role	Notes
1980	Tendres Cousines	Angèle	Credited as Fanny Meunier
1980	Voulez-vous un bébé Nobel ?	Suzanne, la secrétaire Hiagault	Credited as Fanny Meunier
1981	Le bahut va craquer	Béa	Credited as Fanny Meunier
1982	Le Corbillard de Jules	Thérèse	
1983	Un chien dans un jeu de quilles	Anna	
1984	Mesrine		Uncredited
1984	Pinot simple flic	Josyane Krawczyk	
1984	La Tête dans le sac	Eva	
1985	Urgence	Lysa Forstier	
1985	La Tentation d'Isabelle	Lio	
1985	L'Araignée de satin	Rose	
1986	Gauguin, le loup dans le soleil	Juliette Huet	
1987	Killing Time	Violetta	
1988	Stradivari	Caterina	
1988	Prisonnières	Brigitte	
1990	Rio Negro	Marie	
1990	Le Radeau de La Méduse		Deleted scenes (uncredited)
1991	Les Enfants des néons		
1993	The Last Border	Doaiva	
1999	Terre promise	Mother	Short film
2000	Le marquis		Short film
2001	Sang blanc		Short film
2002	Retour en ville		Short film
2005	Paris-Dakar	Prostitute	Short film
2006	C'est beau une ville la nuit		

=== Television ===
Year	Title	Role	Notes
1981	Non-Lieu	Violette Desmartine	TV movie Credited as Fanny Meunier
1981	Mon meilleur Noël	Marie	
1982	Les Contes modernes: Au sujet de l'enfance	Dancing girl	TV movie
1982	Range tes ailes mon ange		TV movie
1983	Le Cimetière des voitures	Kittin	TV movie
1983	Dorothée, danseuse de corde	Dorothée	Miniseries
1984	Cinéma 16	Delphine	Episode: "La fête"
1986	Série noire	Fabienne	Episode: "Piège à flics"
1990	Les Lendemains qui tuent	Marianne	TV movie
1992	Il segno del comando	Emma	TV movie
1995	Docteur Semmelweis	Katia	TV movie
1996	Mafia rouge	Patricia Cheremetiev	TV movie
1997	Les Rapapommes	Voice	TV movie
2002	Carnets d'ado	Mme Costas	Episode: "Les P'tits Lucas"
2008	Le Silence de l'épervier	Séverine	Miniseries
2009–2011	Braquo	Catherine Morlighem	4 episodes
2020	Astrid et Raphaëlle	Laure Gana	2 episodes
2021	Le Voyageur	Sabrina, la femme du chenil	Episode: "La Maison sous le Vent"

== Awards and nominations ==
Year	Award	Film	Result	Ref.
1985	César Award for Most Promising Actress	Pinot simple flic	Nominated	
1988	Prix Romy Schneider	—N/a	Won	
