= Jay Hunter Morris =

American operatic tenor (born 1963)

Jay Hunter Morris (born July 3, 1963) is an American operatic tenor. He is best known internationally for the role of Siegfried in the Metropolitan Opera's 2011–12 series of Wagner's Ring Cycle, performances of which were cinecast and radio broadcast live worldwide, aired on U.S. television, and released on DVD.

== Early life and education ==
Jay Hunter Morris was born and raised in Paris, Texas. Both of his parents were professional musicians: His father, Jack Hunter Morris, who died when Jay was 13, was a Southern Baptist music minister, and his mother, Carolyn, was a church organist. Morris sang in the church choir, and in high school also sang in rock 'n' roll garage bands. He graduated from Paris High School in 1981.

Morris studied music at Paris Junior College, and received a Bachelor of Music Education degree from Baylor University in 1986. After college, he moved to Nashville and performed gospel and country music, and was involved in ministry, but he had little enthusiasm for these pursuits.

A friend took him to see La Traviata in Dallas, and Morris became fascinated by opera; he also met Alfredo Kraus, who recommended a voice teacher to him. Morris received a Master of Music degree in vocal performance at Southern Methodist University, and also studied vocal performance for two years at Juilliard School of Music.

== Career ==
=== Early operatic career ===
In November 1995, Morris performed the role of Anthony Candolino in the original production of Terrence McNally's Tony Award-winning Master Class. In June 1996 he sang Pinkerton with Cheryl Barker in Madama Butterfly for Opera Australia. Morris made his Seattle Opera debut in 1999 in Samuel Barber's Vanessa and his Metropolitan Opera debut in 2007 as Steva in Jenufa, the latter being broadcast worldwide.

In addition to his traditional tenor roles and performances, Morris has sung lead roles in the world premieres of several new operas. He made his San Francisco Opera debut in the role of Mitch, alternating with originator Anthony Dean Griffey, in the world premiere season of André Previn's A Streetcar Named Desire (1998). Morris originated the roles of Father Grenville in Jake Heggie’s Dead Man Walking (2000) at the San Francisco Opera, Unferth in Elliot Goldenthal's and Julie Taymor’s Grendel (2006) at the Los Angeles Opera, Captain James Nolan in John Adams's Doctor Atomic (2005) at the San Francisco Opera, and Marky in The Fly (2008) at Théâtre du Châtelet in Paris. In August 2011, Morris sang the role of Captain Ahab in Jake Heggie's Moby-Dick in its Australian premiere at State Opera of South Australia. He reprised this role in February 2012 at the San Diego Opera and sang it at the San Francisco Opera October–November 2012.

=== Siegfried ===
The Wagner's Ring Cycle role of Siegfried — a lengthy, difficult role that very few tenors can sing — brought Morris to international attention beginning in the fall of 2011. His introduction to the role came from a 2008 invitation by Speight Jenkins to understudy the part for Siegfried and Götterdämmerung at the Seattle Opera for their 2009 season. He then also understudied the role at the Los Angeles Opera in 2010. Morris made his debut as Siegfried in Siegfried at the San Francisco Opera in June 2011.

Beginning October 27, 2011, Morris sang the title role in the Metropolitan Opera's new production of Siegfried and the November 5 performance in the series was broadcast live in movie theatres worldwide via the Metropolitan Opera Live in HD cinecasts. Ben Heppner had originally been scheduled to perform the role, but had dropped out in February. Gary Lehman had been slated to perform instead but withdrew only eight days before opening night, citing illness, and Morris, as understudy, was called in as emergency replacement. Morris also sang Siegfried in the Met's new Götterdämmerung beginning January 27, 2012, and that production was also cinecast and radio broadcast live around the world on February 11, 2012.

Morris reprised the role of Siegfried at the Met in April and May 2012 in two consecutive Ring cycles, including a live Metropolitan Opera radio broadcast of Siegfried on April 21. On May 7, 2012 a documentary film, Wagner's Dream, which documents the making of the 2011–12 Met Ring cycle, including Morris's precipitous casting and rise to prominence, was cinecast worldwide in select cinemas. Encore cinecasts of Morris's Siegfried and Götterdämmerung occurred on May 16 and May 19, 2012, as part of the encore Ring-cycle Metropolitan Opera Live in HD; Siegfried was shown again in select movie theaters on November 22, 2012. On U.S. television, PBS broadcast Wagner's Dream and the entire 2011–12 Met Ring cycle on five consecutive nights starting September 10, 2012 as part of their Great Performances at the Met series. In 2013, Morris shared the Grammy Award for Best Opera Recording for the Met's recording of Der Ring des Nibelungen.

Morris performed two Ring cycles again at the Met in April–May 2013. He sang the role of Siegfried again at Budapest's Wagner Days Festival in June 2014, and repeated the role at Houston Grand Opera in 2016.

Morris's other Wagnerian tenor roles include Tristan, which he sang in concert performances under Zubin Mehta of Tristan und Isolde in Valencia, Spain in June 2012, and Erik in The Flying Dutchman, which he sang at Glimmerglass in the summer of 2013. His Wagnerian repertoire also includes Walther, Lohengrin, Parsifal, and Siegmund.

== Personal life ==
Jay Hunter Morris married dancer-singer-actress Meg Gillentine in 2008. They have a son named Cooper born in 2009. The family's home is in Roswell, Georgia, a suburb of Atlanta.

== DVDs and CDs ==
The following DVDs and CDs are available with Morris in principal roles:

- Madama Butterfly (2008) (DVD) – Pinkerton
- Doctor Atomic (2008) (DVD and Blu-ray) – Captain James Nolan
- Der Ring des Nibelungen (2012) (DVD and Blu-ray) – Siegfried
- Wagner's Dream (DVD and Blu-ray) – Siegfried
- Twilight of the Gods: The Ultimate Wagner Ring Collection (CD and MP3) – Siegfried
- Moby Dick: San Francisco Opera (2013) (DVD) – Captain Ahab

== Book ==
Morris published his humorous autobiography in 2013, titled Diary of a Redneck Opera Zinger. The book is published by Opera Lively Press, and is available in paperback and Amazon Kindle.
