= Gilles Kohler =

French actor and model

Gilles Kohler is a French actor, born November 18, 1948.

Formerly a model, Gilles Kohler started out in 1974 as the blonde angel Jean in Marcel Carné's La Merveilleuse visite. Two years later he plays Jean-Pierre, a lover between two women (Claude Jade in a dual role), in The Choice (1976). In the same year he is leading man alongside to Paola Tedesco in Amore grande, amore libero. David Hamilton commits the beautiful and handsome actor for the part of Pierre in Bilitis (1977) and he plays in other erotic films like in Just Jaeckin's Le Dernier Amant romantique. He is Jean-Paul Belmondos driver in Animal and Bernard Toublanc-Michel hired him for The Mutant. Since the 1980s, Gilles Kohler plays in American soap operas (General Hospital, Hart to Hart, Dallas, All My Children) and small parts in some American movies (Lethal Weapon with Mel Gibson).

== Filmography ==
- 1963: General Hospital (TV Series, guest-star) - Phillipe (1982)
- 1974: La Merveilleuse visite (by Marcel Carné) - Jean
- 1976: The Choice (by Jacques Faber) - Jean-Pierre Arnaud
- 1976: Amore grande, amore libero (by Luigi Perelli) - Paolo
- 1976: L'inconveniente - Kidnapping Rosso Sangue (by Pupo De Luca)
- 1977: Bilitis (by David Hamilton) - Pierre
- 1977: Animal (by Claude Zidi) - Bruno's Driver
- 1977: Le mille-pattes fait des claquettes (by Jean Girault)
- 1978: Le Dernier Amant romantique (by Just Jaeckin) - Scorpion
- 1978: Le Mutant (TV Mini-Series, by Bernard Toublanc-Michel) - Briand
- 1979: Moonraker - Space Fighter (uncredited)
- 1980: Sibylle (Short, by Robert Cappadoro) - the photographer
- 1983: Hart to Hart (TV Series) - Pierre Dupont
- 1983-1984: Dallas (guest star in Odd Man Out, Hell Hath No Fury)
- 1985: All My Children (TV Series) - Gilles St. Claire
- 1987: Lethal Weapon (by Richard Donner) - Mercenary #6
