= Céline and Julie Go Boating =

1974 film by Jacques Rivette

- Theatrical release poster
- French: Céline et Julie vont en bateau: Phantom Ladies Over Paris
- Directed by: Jacques Rivette
- Screenplay by: Juliet Berto; Dominique Labourier; Bulle Ogier; Marie-France Pisier; Jacques Rivette
- Dialogue by: Eduardo de Gregorio
- Based on: Sections based on original stories by Henry James
- Produced by: Barbet Schroeder
- Starring: Juliet Berto; Dominique Labourier; Bulle Ogier; Marie-France Pisier
- Cinematography: Jacques Renard
- Edited by: Nicole Lubtchansky
- Music by: Jean-Marie Sénia
- Production companies: Action Films; Les Films Christian Fechner; Les Films du Losange; Les Films 7; Renn Productions; Saga; Simar Productions; V.M. Productions
- Distributed by: Les Films du Losange
- Release date: 18 September 1974
- Running time: 192 minutes
- Country: France
- Language: French

Céline and Julie Go Boating (French: Céline et Julie vont en bateau: Phantom Ladies Over Paris) is a 1974 French film co-written and directed by Jacques Rivette. The film stars Juliet Berto as Céline and Dominique Labourier as Julie.

It won the Special Prize of the Jury at the Locarno International Film Festival in 1974 and was an Official Selection at the 1974 New York Film Festival.

== Plot ==
Julie is sitting on a park bench reading a book of magic spells when Céline walks past and begins dropping various possessions (à la Lewis Carroll's White Rabbit). Julie picks them up and tries to follow Céline around Paris, sometimes at a fast pace (for instance, sprinting up the stairs of the Rue Foyatier in Montmartre to keep up with Céline's funicular). After adventures following Céline through the Parisian streets—at one point it seems as though they have gone their separate ways, never to meet again—Céline ultimately moves in with Julie. There are incidents of identity swapping, such as Céline pretending to be Julie to meet the latter's childhood sweetheart, and Julie attempting to substitute for Céline at a cabaret audition.

Céline and Julie make individual visits to 7 bis, rue du Nadir-aux-Pommes, the address of a mansion set in quiet, walled-off grounds in Paris. Although seemingly empty and closed in the present day, the house is where Céline realises she knows as the place where she works as a nanny for a family—two jealous sisters, one widower and a sickly child. Soon, a repetitive pattern emerges: Céline or Julie enters the house, disappears for a time, and is then suddenly ejected by unseen hands back to present-day Paris later that same day. Each time, either Céline or Julie is exhausted, having forgotten everything that has happened during their time in the house. However, each time upon returning by taxi, the women discover a candy mysteriously lodged in their mouth. It seems important, so each ensures to carefully save the candy. At one point, they realise that the candy is a key to the other place and time; sucking on the sweet transports them back to the house's alternative reality (a double reference to both Lewis Carroll and Marcel Proust's madeleine) of the day's events.

The two women attempt to solve the central mystery of the house: amid the jealous conniving of the women of the house over the attentions of the widower, a young child is mysteriously murdered. This narrative repeats like a stage play, with exact phrases they soon learn well enough to start joking about. Each time they eat the candy, they remember more of the day's events. Just as when reading a favourite novel or watching a beloved film, they find they can enter the narrative itself, with each twist and turn memorised. Far from being the passive viewers/readers they were at first, the women come to realise that they can seize hold of the story, changing it as they wish.

Céline and Julie begin to take control of the narrative, making it "interactive" by altering their dialogues and inserting different actions into the events unravelling in the house. Finally, in a true act of authorship, they change the ending and rescue the young girl who was originally murdered. Both realities fully conjoin when, after their rescue of the girl from the House of Fiction, the two not only find themselves transported back to Julie's apartment, but this time it is not another "waking dream"—for the young girl, Madlyn, has joined them, safely back in 1970s Paris.

Céline, Julie and Madlyn take a rowboat on a placid river, rowing and gliding happily along. They silently observe another boat quickly passing them on the water, which is carrying the three main protagonists from the house of the alternative reality. However, Céline, Julie and Madlyn see them as the antique props they are, frozen in place.

This time, Céline is the one sitting on a park bench, nearly falling asleep when Julie rushes past her and drops her magic book in her White Rabbit way. Picking it up, Céline calls out and runs after Julie.

== Cast ==
- Juliet Berto as Céline
- Dominique Labourier as Julie
- Bulle Ogier as Camille
- Marie-France Pisier as Sophie
- Barbet Schroeder as Olivier
- Nathalie Asnar as Madlyn
- Marie-Thérèse Saussure as Poupie
- Philippe Clévenot as Guilou
- Anne Zamire as Lil
- Jean Douchet as M'sieur Dédé
- Adèle Taffetas as Alice
- Monique Clément as Myrtille
- Jérôme Richard as Julien
- Michael Graham as Boris
- Jean-Marie Sénia as Cyrille

== Themes ==
Magic is one of the themes of the film. Céline, the stage magician, does her magic tricks in a nightclub performance. Magic seems to come too from Julie's Tarot card readings. Finally, "real" magic comes from the design of a potion, which enables both women to enter the house and take charge of the narrative.

At the start, the two women are leading relatively conventional lives, each having jobs (Julie, a librarian, is more conservative and sensible than Céline, a stage magician, with her bohemian lifestyle). As the film develops, Céline and Julie separate from the world by leaving their jobs, moving in together, and gradually becoming obsessed with the mysterious and magical events in the old house.

In one scene, according to critic Irina Janakievska, Julie is playing Tarot cards, with one of the cards interpreted as signifying that Julie's future is behind her—exactly when we see Céline, wearing a disguise, observing Julie from one of the library desks. As Céline draws an outline of her hand in one of the books, Julie echoes that as she plays with a red ink pad.

Another noticeable aspect of the film is its use of puns. For instance, the title Céline et Julie vont en bateau has other meanings from that of taking a boat ride: "aller en bateau" also means "to get caught up in a story that someone is telling you" or, in English, getting taken up in a "shaggy dog story".

== Production ==
Luc Béraud was assistant director on the movie. Marilù Parolini worked as the set photographer.

== References to film and literature ==
The film references Lewis Carroll's Alice's Adventures in Wonderland, Henry James' "The Romance of Certain Old Clothes", Bioy Casares' La invención de Morel, and Louis Feuillade's Les Vampires (Gaumont, 1915). Dennis Lim of The New York Times in 2012 wrote that the internal part of the film story is an adaptation of James' novel The Other House and that the film was an inspiration for Susan Seidelman's Desperately Seeking Susan and Sara Driver's Sleepwalk. He also points out similarity of themes in David Lynch's Lost Highway, Mulholland Drive and Inland Empire.

== Reception ==
Celine and Julie Go Boating is among Rivette's more acclaimed works. The film tied for number 78 in the British Film Institute's 2022 Sight & Sound poll. On the review aggregator website Rotten Tomatoes, the film holds an approval of 80% based on 54 reviews, with an average rating of 7.9/10. The website's critics consensus reads, "If its flights of fancy can grow wearisome over its lengthy runtime, Céline and Julie Go Boating often justifies its indulgence with wildly imaginative charm." On Metacritic, which uses a weighted average, assigned the film a score of 100 out of 100, based on 4 critic reviews, indicating "universal acclaim".
