= Bilitis =

Bilitis can refer to:

- The Songs of Bilitis, 1894 collection of French erotic poetry attributed to the fictional Bilitis, a purported contemporary of Sappho
  - Trois chansons de Bilitis (Three Songs of Bilitis), a song cycle by Claude Debussy composed in 1897, based on the poems
- Daughters of Bilitis, the first lesbian civil rights organization in the United States, formed in 1955
- Bilitis (film), 1977 romantic drama directed by David Hamilton
