= Célimène et le cardinal =

1992 play by Jacques Rampal

Célimène and the Cardinal (original French title: Célimène et le Cardinal) is a 1992 play by French playwright Jacques Rampal that continues Molière's play The Misanthrope. Well-known actresses such as Ludmila Mikaël (1993) and Claude Jade (2006) performed as Célimène on French stages.

In Rampal's play, the lovers Célimène and Alceste meet again after 20 years. Rampal uses alexandrines like Molière's for this, so that the impression can arise that Molière wrote it, although the play was only written in 1993. The play received three Molière Awards, France's highest theatre prize, in 1993. The play is performed in Quebec, Denmark, Belgium, Switzerland, Poland, Spain and the United States. Translated into Italian, Romanian and Chinese, it is also waiting to be performed in these three countries.

The whole point of Jacques Rampal's play is to bring together the two protagonists of Molière's work to confront them in the light of what they have become. In Le Misanthrope, Célimène was twenty years old and spent her time seducing men without really having any sincere feelings for anyone. She was driven by a desire to please, by coquetry, and was an early advocate of feminine freedom. Célimène, on the surface, has betrayed the coquette she was by leading a tidy life. As for Alceste, adorned in the Cardinal's purple, he has joined a world he once abhorred: that of the Court, where compromise is nonetheless elevated to a status. This improbable face-off is the pretext for a sparkling oratorical joust in which mischievous innuendo, rebellious ardour, incantations, threats and half-hearted confessions follow one another. For Célimène has lost none of her impertinence. Her coquettishness is always present, and she goes so far as to confide to Alceste that, although she is married, she has nevertheless practised "deviations" in her relationship with her husband, so much so that one of her children bears a striking resemblance to one of their mutual friends (Philante from "The Misanthrope"). Alceste has even summoned the flames of hell, but Célimène is unmoved. And when Alceste demands a full confession, she makes it with an impertinence that is not far from jubilation.

== Plot ==
Alceste, now a cardinal, invites himself to the home of his former lover Célimène, who, far from the court she has "betrayed" by marrying a commoner, seems perfectly happy with her four children. But what does the cardinal intend to do with this harmless woman? Save her! He claims that for months he has been haunted by a terrible dream which he believes to be a message from heaven and in which Célimène is in mortal danger ... Célimène, however, has continued to preserve her freedom behind her bourgeois happiness. Célimène is wont to hurl her thoughts at the man who has become a cardinal. Both engage in a hierarchical and feminist battle over the dubious significance of the clergy. The play deals with topics such as religious intolerance, fanaticism, the place of women in society, among fast-paced twists and turns and with exquisite humour.

== Film versions ==
The production by Rampal himself starring Claude Jade and Patrick Préjean was filmed for television in 2006 and is available on DVD from Éditions l'Harmattan.The film was also shown in 2006 at the cinema of the Lucernaire cultural centre in Paris. The version directed by Bernard Murat with Ludmila Mikaël and Gérard Desarthe has also been released on DVD.

== Critics Reviews ==
"Rampal's staging is tidy and illustrative, but it gives freedom to the actors. Claude Jade, whom we like to see again, is very good as the challenging wife who, with all her finesse, throws Patrick Préjean under the bus as God's servant. One believes in her. She bubbles. It is impossible to resist her. And Préjean ages magnificently" (Jean-Luc Jeener, Le Figaro, 8 March 2006).

"What if Molière's Enemy of Man had a sequel? Jacques Rampal imagined it when he created Célimène and the Cardinal. The idea behind it? 20 years after their separation, the two protagonists meet again. In Misanthrope, Célimène is a charming, free-spirited, worldly young woman living at the king's court. Twenty years later, Célimène has betrayed her status by marrying a commoner and is living an upright life. She receives a letter announcing a visit from Alceste, who has since become a cardinal. With Célimène and the cardinal, Rampal would (according to some critics) commit suicide. Complete Poquelin? Pure madness! Nevertheless, the play is a little gem of malice and satire that Molière undoubtedly would not have denied. Although it is written in alexandrines, the words are no less contemporary and the themes dealt with are of burning topicality. The excellent acting by Patrick Préjean and Claude Jade gives this modern play the stamp of a great classic. In Bourgeois gentilhomme, Monsieur Jourdain learns to bow: an indispensable learning process for the spectators who will have the good fortune to welcome Jacques Rampal and his actors" (Sébastien Bei, Marianne, 5 April 2006).

"A text that requires great actors. This Thursday, 2 August, two brilliant actors, Claude Jade and Patrick Préjean, transfer this brilliance to Rampal's play. Gestures, posture, phrases and looks... the body language of Jade and Préjean has a perfect naturalness and the alexandrines experience a tremendous spontaneity through them. The audience gets to enjoy a performance by two very great actors." (Le Litteraire, august 2006)

In the end, libertinism and adultery win the day. All this is expressed not only through the use of beautiful, admirably mastered language and continual witty lines, but also with the elegance and distinctive music of alexandrines and with a keen sense of theatre that has real contemporary resonance and, what's more, the best of the best in the field. (Christian Jarniat, "Résonances lyriques", 12 may 2022)
