= Gary Lehman =

American opera singer

Gary Lehman is an American operatic tenor, specialising in the Heldentenor repertoire.

He initially trained as a baritone at Youngstown State University, continued his studies at Indiana University, and as a member of the Lyric Opera Center for American Artists gave 90 performances with the Lyric Opera of Chicago. In 1995, he sang the lead tenor role of Herman in The Queen of Spades. From the 1990s into the next decade he sang baritone roles such as the Count in The Marriage of Figaro and Ford in Falstaff.

He made his debut in the Heldentenor fach in 2005, replacing Plácido Domingo as the title role in Parsifal for Los Angeles Opera. The following year he sang Samson in Samson et Dalila.

Lehman's next Wagner performances were in the title role in Tannhäuser in March 2007. A year later he made his both his Metropolitan Opera and role debuts in Tristan und Isolde. He repeated the role with the Mariinsky Opera in June 2008 and with Leipzig Opera in January 2009, and gave concert performances with the Philharmonia Orchestra throughout Europe in August and September 2010. Further Wagner roles have been Siegmund in Die Walküre, also at the Met, and a recording of the title role in Parsifal.

His repertoire also includes Canio in Pagliacci, the title role in Peter Grimes, Florestan in Fidelio and Alwa in Lulu.

After Ben Heppner dropped out of the Metropolitan Opera's 2010–2012 production of the Ring Cycle, it was announced that Lehman would sing Siegfried in both Siegfried in October 2011 and Götterdämmerung in January 2012. In turn, Lehman himself had to drop out, citing illness, and both Siegfried roles were sung by his understudy, Jay Hunter Morris.

Lehmann's appearances in 2013 included the Drum Major in Wozzeck at the Vienna State Opera.
