= Le Collectionneur de cerveaux =

Thinking Robots
- Directed by: Michel Subiela
- Written by: Michel Subiela based on a novel by George Langelaan
- Starring: Claude Jade; François Dunoyer; André Reybaz; Gisèle Casadesus
- Cinematography: Claude Robin
- Music by: Vladimir Cosma
- Release date: 23 October 1976
- Running time: 93 mins
- Country: France
- Language: French

Le Collectionneur de cerveaux or (The Collector of Brains) is a French horror film (1976) based on George Langelaan's novel Les robots pensants (The Thinking Robots) starring Claude Jade.

The young pianist Penny Vanderwood (Claude Jade) notices that a robot, created by the Count Saint-Germain (André Reybaz), plays chess in the same way as her deceased fiancé Robert Tournon. She convinces her friend Lewis Armeight (François Dunoyer) to open Robert's coffin, which is empty. Penny seeks to solve this mystery and embarks on the trail of the count...

Fantastic story adapted from George Langelaan's "Thinking Robots" and which portrays the contemporary adventure of a chess-playing automaton. Alone on the stage of a provincial theatre, the famous pianist Penny Vanderwood practices for her next piano recital. A middle-aged man breaks into the theatre and observes the young woman. As soon as she finishes playing, he applauds at length: "I had long dreamed of inventing a pianist robot and when I saw you, I knew it would look like you." The man leaves Penny his business card: "Count of St. Germain, creator of automatons." The day after her recital, Penny reads in bed a flattering newspaper article dedicated to her. The girl's attention is drawn to another article announcing a championship that pits the best chess players in town against a mysterious and infallible robot presented by the Comte de Saint-Germain... Intrigued, Penny decides to extend her stay to attend the tournament...
