= The Island of Thirty Coffins =

1919 novel by Maurice Leblanc

The Island of Thirty Coffins / The Secret of Sarek
- Cover of L'Île aux trente cercueils (1969 edition)
- Author: Maurice Leblanc
- Language: French
- Genre: Detective novel
- Publication date: 1919
- Media type: Print

The Secret of Sarek (L'Île aux trente cercueils / The Island of Thirty Coffins) is a French novel by Maurice Leblanc, 1919, also known for the film version as a mini-series in 1979 starring Claude Jade as Véronique.

The action begins in France in 1917. The heroine of the story is Véronique d'Hergemont. In 1903, her father, Professor Antoine d'Hergemont, kidnapped her baby and it was later reported by news outlets that they both had drowned in the sea.It was her father's revenge on Véronique's marriage to Count Vorski. While watching a film, Véronique spots her childhood signature "V d'H" mysteriously written on the side of a hut in the background of a scene. Her visit to the location of the film shoot deepens the mystery, but also provides further clues that point her towards long-lost relations and a great secret from ancient history: She finds a prophecy: "Four women on the cross, stone of God that gives life or death. Thirty sacrifices for thirty coffins". When Véronique arrives on the island of Sarek, the prophecy comes true. Many people die horrific deaths and Véronique also ends up in a torture chamber. She faces the sinister forces. It is a secret that will require the services of a particular man, to unravel.

== TV series ==
In 1979 a successful TV series "L'Île aux trente cercueils" was released. Claude Jade plays the leading role as Véronique.

Director: Marcel Cravenne

=== Cast ===
- Claude Jade (Véronqiue d'Hergemont)
- Jean-Paul Zehnacker (Vorski)
- Yves Beneyton (Maroux)
- Pascal Sellier (Francois / Eric)
- Julie Philippe (Elfride)
- Georges Marchal (Antoine d'Hergemont)
- Marie Mergey (Honorine)

In the mini-series, the figure of Arsène Lupin, who appears at the end like deus ex machina, does not exist. So Véronique can solve the mystery alone with the help of a friend. In the TV version, the villains Elfride and Vorski die at the end: Elfride stabs and Vorski and shoots himself. Then Véronique can leave the island accompanied by two other characters and the dog Aramis.
