= Le bahut va craquer =

Schools Falling Apart
- Le bahut va craquer
- Directed by: Michel Nerval
- Written by: Michel Nerval
- Starring: Michel Galabru; Claude Jade; Darry Cowl
- Cinematography: Jean Badal
- Edited by: Robert Isnardon; Monique Isnardon
- Music by: Jean Musy
- Production company: Paris Prociné
- Distributed by: Coline; Giangi Film
- Release date: May 13, 1981
- Running time: 90 mins
- Country: France
- Language: French

Le bahut va craquer (Schools Falling Apart) is a 1981 French comedy film directed by Michel Nerval.

A Parisian School: The young girl Beatrice (Fanny Bastien), who lives alone with her mother (Dany Carrel) is pregnant. The school's headmaster (Michel Galabru) decides to decriut Bea at the door. The other Students unite to sequestering the headmaster in company of the tutor in math (Darry Cowl) and the teacher of philosophy (Claude Jade) ... The principal, the math teacher and the teacher of philosophy will become the hostages of students and pay for their misunderstanding.

== Cast ==
- Michel Galabru as Principal
- Claude Jade as Teacher of Philosophy
- Darry Cowl as Teacher of Math
- Robert Castel as Teacher of English
- Henri Guybet as A Pawn
- Fanny Bastien as Bea
- Dany Carrel as Bea's Mother
- Caroline Béranger as Véronique
- Eric Civanyan as Francis
- Katia Tchenko as Francis's sister
- Jacques Monod as Police Inspector
- Anne Benoît Serge Guirchoun as le voyou dans le café
