= Killing Time (1987 film) =

1987 thriller film

- Directed by: Édouard Niermans
- Screenplay by: Jacques Audiard; Alain Le Henry; Édouard Niermans
- Starring: Bernard Giraudeau; Fanny Bastien
- Cinematography: Lutz Konermann
- Edited by: Yves Deschamps; Jacques Witta
- Release date: 1987
- Language: German

Killing Time (French: Poussière d'ange, lit. 'Angel dust') is a 1987 thriller drama film co-written and directed by Édouard Niermans. It was screened at the 44th Venice International Film Festival.

== Cast ==
- Bernard Giraudeau as Simon Blount
- Fanny Bastien as Violetta
- Fanny Cottençon as Martine
- Jean-Pierre Sentier as Landry
- Michel Aumont as Florimont
- Gérard Blain as Broz
- Luc Lavandier as Gabriel Spielmacher

== Release ==
The film was screened at the 44th Venice International Film Festival, in the Venice International Film Critics' Week sidebar. It was also screened at the 1987 Mostra de València, in which it won the Golden Palm, and at the 1988 Montreal World Film Festival.

== Reception ==
A contemporary Variety review described the film as 'another Gallic film noir, yet a stylish cut or two above the rest, and confirmation of the talent of director Edouard Niermans', 'shot through with bristling cinematic energy and vivid a performances by Bernard Giraudeau and Fanny Bastien'. Canadian film critic Linda Soucy described the film as 'a poetic and dreamlike work'.
