= The Boat on the Grass =

1971 film

- Directed by: Gérard Brach
- Written by: Gérard Brach; Roman Polanski; Suzanne Schiffman
- Produced by: Jean-Pierre Rassam
- Starring: Claude Jade; Jean-Pierre Cassel; John McEnery; Valentina Cortese
- Cinematography: Étienne Becker
- Edited by: Claude Barrois
- Music by: François Rabbath
- Production companies: Cinétel; Vicco Films; Sinar Films
- Distributed by: Valoria Films
- Release date: 16 April 1971
- Running time: 90 minutes
- Country: France
- Language: French

The Boat on the Grass (French: Le Bateau sur l'herbe) is a 1971 French drama film directed by Gérard Brach and starring Claude Jade, Jean-Pierre Cassel, John McEnery and Valentina Cortese. The film's sets were designed by the art director Alain Coiffier. It was entered into the 1971 Cannes Film Festival.

== Plot summary ==
In this gentle, tragic drama, Olivier (John McEnery) is a wealthy young man. He spends his time building a boat on the lawn with his friend David (Jean-Pierre Cassel), a poor fisherman whom he grew up with. Though hardly idyllic, the relative calm provided by their friendship is disrupted by Eleonore (Claude Jade), a cute and determined young woman who sets her sights on David. She wants to wean David from his friendship with Olivier and plays on David's long-dormant jealousy of Olivier's wealth and easy life. Eleonore also plays the flipside of the jealousy issue, claiming that Olivier has made passes at her.

== Cast ==
- Claude Jade as Eleonore
- Jean-Pierre Cassel as David
- John McEnery as Oliver
- Valentina Cortese as Christine
- Paul Préboist as Leon
- Micha Bayard as Germaine
- Pierre Asso as Alexis
- Jean de Coninck as Jean-Claude
- Carla Marlier as La parasite

== Production ==
Filming took place in Vallon-sur-Gée, in the Sarthe department.

== Critical reception ==
Vincent Canby: "Adorable acting, especially by Claude Jade, who brings the right mixture of conventionalism and self-interest into her role." The film was nominated for the Grand Prix and the Prix du Jury at the Cannes Film Festival.

== Bibliography ==
- Young, Jordan R. Roman Polanski: Behind the Scenes of His Classic Early Films. Rowman & Littlefield Publishers, 2022.
