= Les Enfants des néons =

- Directed by: Brahim Tsaki
- Written by: Brahim Tsaki
- Starring: Boumediene Belasri; Rachid Ferrache; Fanny Bastien; Béatrice Zeitoun
- Music by: Jack Arel
- Release date: 1991
- Running time: 87 minutes
- Countries: Algeria; France
- Language: French / Arabic

Les Enfants des néons (in English: The Neon Children) is a 1990 Franco-Algerian film directed by filmmaker Brahim Tsaki, shot around the late 1980s and early 1990s. The film deals with the lives of young Maghrebians in a suburban housing project, exploring their friendships and social struggles (exclusion, scavenging for materials, and conflicted romantic relationships).

== Synopsis ==
In a large suburban housing project live Djamel, a young metal scavenger, and Karim, his mute companion. Their daily lives are punctuated by scavenging for scrap materials and resourcefulness. They do nothing but collect materials. One night, Djamel saves Claude, a student being attacked in the street, creating tension with his girlfriend, Najet, and highlighting the social and cultural divides between them. The film is a sweeping portrait of friendship, hope, and disillusionment set in the suburbs.

== Technical information ==
- Director: Brahim Tsaki
- Screenplay: Brahim Tsaki
- Cinematography: Gérard Loubeau
- Editing: Michel Patient / Tony Molière (according to credits sources)
- Music: Jack Arel
- Running time: 87 minutes
- Country: France / Algeria

== Cast ==
- Boumediene Belasri as Djamel
- Rachid Ferrache as Karim (mute)
- Fanny Bastien as Claude
- Béatrice Zeitoun

== Production ==
The film was directed by Brahim Tsaki, an Algerian-born filmmaker who worked between France and Algeria. Online records and festival listings indicate it was shot in suburban housing estates and released around 1990–1991. It was screened at specialized events and presented at author-focused festivals such as Algiers and Cairo.

== Themes ==
The film explores North African youth in the suburbs, economic marginality (metal scavenging), the difficulties of social integration, friendship and solidarity, disability (a mute character), and interpersonal and romantic tensions. These recurring themes are frequently noted in the film’s critical and descriptive entries.

== Reception and festivals ==
Several sources (the actress’s website, MUBI, Unifrance) report festival screenings — the “Perspectives” selection at Cannes is mentioned in biographical records, along with presentations at the Cairo Festival and Algerian author film festivals. Critical notes (MUBI, SensCritique) praise the film’s poetic and social treatment of its subject.

== Distribution and archives ==
The film is listed in several databases (MUBI, Africultures, Unifrance). Excerpts, posters, and related documents are available on these platforms.

== See also ==
- List of Algerian films
