= Bartleby (1970 film) =

1970 British film by Anthony Friedman

- DVD Cover
- Directed by: Anthony Friedman
- Screenplay by: Rodney Carr-Smith; Anthony Friedman
- Based on: "Bartleby, the Scrivener; A Story of Wall-street" by Herman Melville
- Produced by: Rodney Carr-Smith
- Starring: Paul Scofield; John McEnery; Thorley Walters
- Cinematography: Ian Wilson
- Edited by: John S. Smith
- Music by: Roger Webb
- Production companies: Pantheon Film Productions; Amber Entertainment
- Distributed by: British Lion Film Corporation
- Release date: 18 November 1970 (London Film Festival)
- Running time: 78 minutes
- Country: United Kingdom
- Language: English

Bartleby is a 1970 British drama film directed by Anthony Friedman and starring Paul Scofield, John McEnery and Thorley Walters. It was written by Rodney Carr-Smith and Friedman adapted from the 1857 short story "Bartleby, the Scrivener; A Story of Wall-street" by Herman Melville. The film relocates the narrative from New York in the 1850s to London in the 1970s.

== Plot ==
Bartleby (John McEnery) arrives at Euston Station, in London. Presumably, having departed from outside the capital. He places his belongings in a luggage locker, at the station, and then proceeds to seek work.

After making a few phone calls, asking for work, Bartleby arrives at an accountancy office. The accountant (Paul Scofield) interviews Bartleby who gives curt answers to questions given to him. After being asked to think carefully as to why he should be given work, Bartelby says, "I accept."

Whilst Bartleby is hard working he soon starts refusing work, often with the phrase, "I would prefer not to." Later, Bartleby says that he will not be working on accounts for the rest of the day and leaves the office. The accountant follows Bartleby to a run down street and tries to reason with him. Bartleby is heard to say, "What will happen to all the bottles, cans and papers that I throw away."

The accountant discovers that Bartleby is living in the office. Exasperated by Bartleby's attitude, he sacks him but returns to the office in the morning to find him still living there. The accountant then moves his firm to new offices but Bartleby continues to live at the old premises. Tenants at the former office block complain to the accountant, who goes there to reason with Bartleby.

The police are called and Bartleby is taken away. Later, we see Bartleby in a psychiatric hospital, refusing food. The accountant pays him a visit. Bartleby says, "I know who you are but I have nothing to say to you." On his next visit, the accountant discovers Bartleby on a bench, apparently asleep. On trying to awaken him, he discovers that Bartleby has died.

== Cast ==
- Paul Scofield as the accountant
- John McEnery as Bartleby
- Thorley Walters as the colleague
- Colin Jeavons as Tucker
- Raymond Mason as landlord
- Charles Kinross as tenant
- Neville Barber as first client
- Robin Askwith as office boy
- Hope Jackman as Hilda, tealady
- John Watson as doctor
- Christine Dingle as patient
- Rosalind Elliot as Miss Brown, secretary
- Tony Parkin as Dickinson, clerk

== Production ==
It was shot at Twickenham Studios and on location around London. The sets were designed by the art director Simon Holland.

== Critical reception ==
The Monthly Film Bulletin wrote:

Initially, as the camera leapfrogs around London establishing towering office blocks and scurrying commuters, while some fancy editing shows John McEnery glooming in the streets with his fruitless telephone calls in quest of a job continuing on the soundtrack, it looks as though Bartleby is going to rediscover swinging London all over again. Anchored by quiet, competent performances from Scofield and McEnery, the style gradually grows less queasy, but after the mannered generalisations of this opening (soulless London, heartless commerce), it comes as little surprise to find that the film is opportunistically – and none too delicately – hitching Melville's superb novella to the contemporary drop-out phenomenon.

Variety wrote:

This modestly-budgeted picture, written smoothly by Anthony Friedmann and Rodney Carr-Smith, from Herman Melville's story and directed by Friedmann, is downbeat. But it is intriguing because of the two main performances. Scofield, who radiates thought and integrity in every speech movement and gesture is fine. McEnery underplays the incomprehensible, pitiful Bartleby with just the right note to engender sympathy but not ridicule. The film is a riddle but it should intrigue any thoughtful filmgoer. It is directed with restraint by Friedmann and is cut sparsely by John C. Smith.

The TV Guide reviewer commented that "the film is brooding, slow, and annoying at times, but the vision of McEnery as Bartleby is not easily forgotten. Scofield...gives a supremely intelligent portrayal of a man caught between logic and emotion."

Stanley Kauffmann of The New Republic called Bartleby "a poor film but with superb acting in it".

The Radio Times Guide to Films gave the film 3 out of 5 stars, writing: "Herman Melville's short story makes for a unremittingly downbeat yet fascinating movie, mainly due to the riveting interplay between its two stars. ... A mysterious, chilling allegory."

== See also ==
- Bartleby, a 2001 adaptation of the same story starring David Paymer and Crispin Glover
