= The Pawn (film) =

- Directed by: Christian Gion
- Produced by: Jacques Bar; Sylvio Tabet
- Starring: Henri Guybet; Claude Jade; Maureen Kerwin
- Music by: Jean-Michel Caradec; Jean Musy
- Release date: 1978
- Running time: 90 minutes
- Country: France
- Language: French

The Pawn (French: Le Pion) is a 1978 French comedy film directed by Christian Gion starring Henri Guybet and Claude Jade.

== Plot ==
Bertrand Barabi (Henri Guybet) is a French teacher and deputy supervisor in a school in province. He attended the literary circles of his city and he is despised by his students as the teachers of the institution. Bertrand Barabi lives for the sake of miss Thuillier, professor of French. Dominique Benech (Claude Jade), his lonely neighbor, piano teacher and mother of one of his pupils, who has tender feelings for him, asks him to tutor her son Michel (Mathieu Vermesh). Excited after reading a text by Bertrand, Dominique encourages him to write the novel "Le Pion" (The Pawn). Bertrand continues writing his novel he soon sends to a Parisian publisher. The book is acclaimed. With his pseudonym, Bertrand remains anonymous, but journalists are quick to reveal the identity of the "Prix Goncourt". However, success does not turn the head of Bertrand. And with the help of his students he even ridicules those who wronged him, before rejoining the discrete and tender Dominique who awaits.

== Cast ==
- Henri Guybet : Bertrand Barabi, dit Bergerac
- Claude Jade : Dominique Benech
- Maureen Kerwin : Mademoiselle Thuillier
- Claude Piéplu : Le censeur
- Michel Galabru : L'inspecteur d'académie
- Claude Dauphin : Albert Carraud
- Bernard Musson : Boussignac, Director of school
- Roland Giraud : The Minister
- Mathieu Vermesh : Michel Benech
- Roger Perinoz
- Raymond Colom
- François Guétary
- Dominique Vallée
- Denise Glaser
