= Dominique Labourier =

French actress (born 1943)

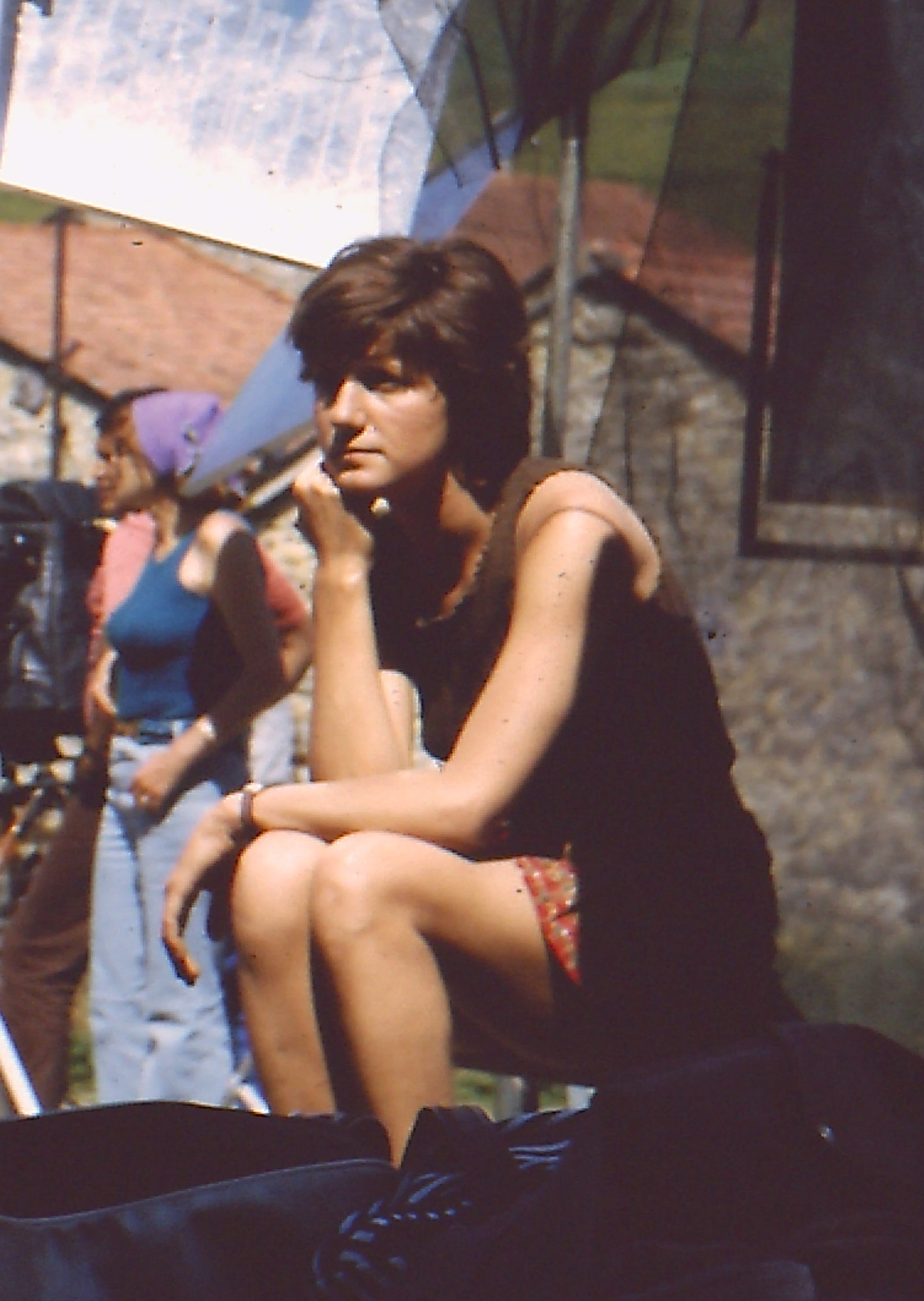
- Dominique Labourier in 1972
- Born: 29 April 1943 (age 83); Reims, France
- Occupation: Actress
- Years active: 1968–present

Dominique Labourier (born 29 April 1943) is a French actress. Born in Reims, France, she is best known for starring as Julie in Jacques Rivette's film Celine and Julie Go Boating (Céline et Julie vont en bateau, 1974). She has appeared in more than 40 films since 1968.

== Selected filmography ==
- Les Oiseaux rares (1967)
- The Little Theatre of Jean Renoir (1970)
- It Only Happens to Others (1971)
- Beau Masque (1972)
- Celine and Julie Go Boating (1974)
- Jonah Who Will Be 25 in the Year 2000 (1976)
- City of Women (1980)
- La Passante du Sans-Souci (1982)
- State of Grace (1986)
- Eugénie Grandet (1994)
- Time Regained (1999)
- Les Blessures assassines (2000)
