= State of Grace (1986 film) =

- Directed by: Jacques Rouffio
- Written by: Jacques Rouffio; Jacques Kirsner
- Produced by: Jacques Kirsner
- Starring: Nicole Garcia; Pierre Arditi; Sami Frey
- Cinematography: Dominique Chapuis
- Edited by: Anna Ruiz
- Music by: Philippe Sarde
- Production companies: Mod Films; Séléna Audiovisuel
- Distributed by: Acteurs Auteurs Associés
- Release date: 24 December 1986
- Running time: 90 min
- Country: France
- Language: French
- Box office: $2.3 million

State of Grace or L'État de Grace is a 1986 French drama romance film, directed by Jacques Rouffio.

== Plot ==
The film is set in 1980s France during the early years of François Mitterrand's presidency. Florence Vannier-Buchet, a women's rights activist, is happily married to Protestant banker Jean-Marc Buchet who operates a major sporting goods company.

During a stormy meeting of the Conseil national du patronat français (CNPF; National Council of French Employers), she meets Antoine Lombard, the new Secretary of State for Universities and Socialist Activities, and elected member of the "pink wave." The two become involved in a passionate extramarital romance. They attempt to carry on their affair, fulfil their careers, all while seeking political change.

== Cast ==
- Nicole Garcia as Florence Vannier-Buchet
- Pierre Arditi as Jean-Marc Vannier-Buchet
- Sami Frey as Antoine Lombard
- Dominique Labourier as Jeanne Lombard
- Yvette Etiévant as Madeleine Lombard
- Jean Rougerie as Edmond Lombard
- Catherine Hiegel as Sylvie
- Philippe Léotard as Pierre-Julien
- Yves Pignot as Eric Buppon
- Marc Berman as Weber
- Cécile Mazan as Nathalie
- André Thorent as Florian
- Jean-Eric Grandgérard as Claude
- Catherine Jacob
- Maïwenn
