= Why Not Me? (film) =

- French: Pourquoi pas moi?
- Directed by: Stéphane Giusti
- Written by: Stéphane Giusti
- Produced by: Caroline Adrian; Marie Masmonteil
- Starring: Amira Casar; Julie Gayet; Bruno Putzulu; Alexandra London
- Cinematography: Antoine Roch
- Edited by: Catherine Schwartz
- Production company: Elzévir Films
- Distributed by: UGC Fox Distribution
- Release dates: 6 January 1999 (France); 21 October 1999 (Spain)
- Running time: 95 mins.
- Countries: France; Spain; Switzerland
- Language: French

Why Not Me? (French: Pourquoi pas moi?; Spanish: ¿Entiendes?) is a 1999 French-Spanish comedy film written and directed by Stéphane Giusti. The film stars Amira Casar, Julie Gayet, Bruno Putzulu, and Alexandra London.

== Plot ==
In Barcelona, Camille, Eva, Ariane and their friend Nico are out as lesbian and gay to almost everyone, and they decide that the time has come to tell all their parents about their sexual orientation. To make it possible, Camille's liberal mother hosts a party at her home with the unsuspecting parents invited.

== Cast ==
- Amira Casar as Camille
- Julie Gayet as Eva
- Bruno Putzulu as Nico
- Alexandra London as Ariane
- Carmen Chaplin as Lili
- Johnny Hallyday as José
- Marie-France Pisier as Irene
- Brigitte Roüan as Josepha
- Assumpta Serna as Diane
- Elli Medeiros as Malou
- Vittoria Scognamiglio as Sara
- Jean-Claude Dauphin as Alain
- Joan Crosas as Tony
- Montse Mostaza as Tina
- Marta Gil as Clara
- Cedric Dupuy as Frenchie

== Accolades ==
Why Not Me? won the Best Lesbian Feature at the 1999 Seattle Lesbian & Gay Film Festival, followed by the Audience Award and the Jury Award for Best Fiction Feature at the 2000 Miami Gay and Lesbian Film Festival.
