= Edgar Baitzel =

German opera director (1955-2007)

Edgar Baitzel (17 May 1955 – 11 March 2007) was a German opera director and artistic administrator.

Born in Koblenz, Baitzel spent the first part of his career in Europe working on the staffs of several notable opera companies, including the Badisches Staatstheater Karlsruhe, the Bavarian State Opera, the Opéra de Nice, and the Theater der Bundesstadt Bonn. In November 2001 he joined the staff of the Los Angeles Opera (LAO) as the director of artistic operations. He was appointed the LAO's artistic director in May 2003 and then the company's chief operating officer in February 2006.

Baitzel's tenure at the LAO was marked by a significant expansion of the company's performance schedule and financial improvement. He also forged strong artistic partnerships with several notable directors, including David Cronenberg, Achim Freyer, William Friedkin, Garry Marshall, Maximilian Schell, and Julie Taymor. He was also responsible for commissioning several world premiere's for the LAO, including Deborah Drattell's Nicholas and Alexandra (2003), Elliot Goldenthal's Grendel (2006), and Howard Shore's The Fly (2008). Having never retired, he died of cancer in Los Angeles at the age of 51.
