= Eugénie Grandet (film) =

- Directed by: Jean-Daniel Verhaeghe
- Written by: Pierre Moustiers
- Starring: Jean Carmet; Alexandra London; Dominique Labourier; Claude Jade; Pierre Vernier
- Cinematography: Marc Quilici, Gérard Vigneron
- Music by: Michel Portal
- Release date: 1994
- Running time: 90 mins
- Country: France
- Language: French

Eugénie Grandet is a 1994 French film directed by Jean-Daniel Verhaeghe. The film starred Jean Carmet in his last role.

== Plot summary ==
Monsieur Grandet (Jean Carmet) is a wealthy cooper who lives an extremely frugal lifestyle. His wife (Dominique Labourier) and his daughter Eugénie (Alexandra London) live a quiet, isolated existence.

The local families Des Grassins and Cruchot want to marry their sons to Eugénie. On her 23rd birthday, Lucienne des Grassins (Claude Jade) triumphed about the success of her son Adolphe (Olivier Delor) at the heiress, arrives Charles (Jean-Claude Adelin), Eugenie's cousin to visit at his uncle; he has no idea that his father is dead by suicide after his bankruptcy. Eugénie and her cousin fall in love, and the unworldly girl felt for the first time the wild joy of passion. But her father, who has no idea, does not intend to keep the useless eaters in the house, and sends Charles without a sou to India. First, however, Eugénie lends him her coin collection, which her father had given her for her birthday.

== Crew ==
- Director : Jean-Daniel Verhaeghe
- Writer : Pierre Moustiers, based on the novel by Honoré de Balzac
- Composer: Michel Portal

== Cast ==
- Alexandra London : Eugénie Grandet
- Jean Carmet : Félix Grandet
- Jean-Claude Adelin : Charles Grandet
- Dominique Labourier : Madame Grandet
- Claude Jade : Lucienne des Grassins
- Pierre Vernier : Monsieur des Grassins
- Bernard Haller : Abbé Cruchot
- Sacha Briquet : Maître Cruchot
- Olivier Delor : Adolphe des Grassins
- Rose Thierry : Nanon
- Pascal Elso : Bonfons Cruchot

== Prize ==
7 d'or 1995

- 7 d'or for Best Actor Jean Carmet
- 7 d'or for Best Composer Michel Portal
