= Voglia di volare =

- Genre: Drama; Adventure
- Written by: Pier Giuseppe Murgia; Claude Brulé
- Directed by: Pier Giuseppe Murgia
- Starring: Gianni Morandi; Claude Jade; Linda Celani; Daniela Poggi; Anna Campori; John Armstead
- Theme music composer: Georges Delerue
- Country of origin: Italy
- Original language: Italian
- No. of episodes: 4

Production
- Cinematography: Giuseppe Pinoni
- Production company: RAI

Original release
- Network: Rai 1
- Release: December 2 – December 23, 1984

Voglia di volare ("Desire to Fly") is an Italian miniseries starring Gianni Morandi and Claude Jade.

Pilot Davide has left his wife Barbara. Their daughter, Adreina, stays with Davide. Davide's father, a stubborn farmer suffering from dementia, had never accepted his German daughter-in-law, Barbara. Adreina would like to get rid of Davide's new partner, Valerie, a model, and would like for her parents to get back together. Barbara, meanwhile, pairs up with Steve Carrington, a brutal US-General, with whom Adreina also does not get along. Adreina spreads rumors that Davide and Barbara are getting back together, causing Valerie to leave. Adreina, spurned by a love interest, attempts suicide. Barbara leaves Steve because he beat her, and Davide takes her in. They reconcile and decide to start over, slowly.

== Cast ==
- Gianni Morandi as Davide
- Claude Jade as Barbara
- Linda Celani as Adreina
- Daniela Poggi as Valeria
- Jacques Dufilho as Davide's father
- Anna Campori as Davide's mother
- John Armstead as Steve
- Isabelle Spade as Cristina
- Christian Borromeo as Dirk
- Stephan Rafi as Stefano
- Dario Casalini as Dirk's brother
