= Les oiseaux rares =

- Genre: Comedy; Drama
- Created by: Elisabeth Fontenay
- Directed by: Jean Dewever
- Starring: Claude Jade; Dominique Labourier; Anna Gaylor; Guy Saint-Jean; Bernadette Robert
- Country of origin: France
- Original language: French
- No. of series: 1
- No. of episodes: 60

Production
- Producer: ORTF
- Running time: 30 minutes

Original release
- Release: 17 March 1969

Les oiseaux rares (The Rare Birds) is a French TV series in 60 episodes, made in 1967 and released in 1969, starring Claude Jade and Dominique Labourier in their debuts.

In a large villa, the middle-class couple Henri (Guy Saint-Jean) and Florence Massonneau (Anna Gaylor) lives with his five daughters. While the eldest, Catherine (Nicole Chaput) awaits her wedding with her fiancé Bernard (Patrick Lancelot), the second daughter, Martine (Dominique Labourier), is in love with Paul Legrand (Jean-Pierre Ducos), the Spanish teacher of the youngest daughter, Valérie (Bernadette Robert). Most cause for concern, however, the 16-year-old Sylvie (Claude Jade), who teases her sisters and also insists on getting a horse. The horse Turlutu belongs to the friend (Jean Perrin) of her elder sister Juliette (Françoise Godde). But as their relationship has ended, the horse is far away. Sylvie gets a new horse, but the villa is not a horsehome and Sylvie is kidnapping the beloved horse Monsieur. As this at night wreaks devastation in the living room, he should disappear, but Sylvie arrange a lottery win and she buys the horse back. Sylvie soon finds new challenges, to drive her father to despair. Your faithful accomplice is the Spanish maid Carmen (blonde and without an accent: Nadine Servan). With the English exchange students Dorothy (Marie Privat) and Emily Graham (Hélène Callot) disappears from London to Paris to ensure there vertebra. Soon Catherine is back after breaking up with Bernard to Massonneaus, Juliette crush on the pretty Charles (Richard Leduc) and finally learns Maman Massonneau is pregnant again. While in the Villa rages the joy of life, calls a police commissioner (Raoul Delfosse) to the final. In the last of the 60 episodes of the police storm the house to arrest all those present without exception. Whether this is achieved at the lively bunch of seven family members and a dozen friends, leaves the end.

== Production ==
The series was created and shoot in 1967 in the studios in Epinay and Vésinet and Paris.

Because the theater commitments of leading actresses Claude Jade (as Frida in Henri IV at the Théâtre moderne) and Dominique Labourier (as Lorette with Richard Leduc in L'Été in Royan) the series was filmed in two seasons and broadcast two years later than an entire season.

== Cast ==
- Nicole Chaput : Catherine Massonneau
- Claude Jade : Sylvie Massonneau
- Dominique Labourier : Martine Massonneau
- Anna Gaylor : Florence Massonneau
- Guy Saint-Jean : Henri Massonneau
- Bernadette Robert : Valérie Massonneau
- Françoise Godde : Juliette Massonneau
- Patrick Lancelot : Bernard
- Nadine Servan : Carmen
- Jean-Pierre Ducos : Paul Legrand
- Richard Leduc : Charles
- Bernard Menez : The Friend of Martine
