= John McEnery =

British actor (1943–2019)

- Born: John Murray McEnery; 1 November 1943; Walsall, West Midlands, England
- Died: 12 April 2019 (aged 75); United Kingdom
- Occupation: Actor
- Years active: 1964–2019
- Spouse: Stephanie Beacham (m. 1973; div. 1979)
- Children: 3

John Murray McEnery (1 November 1943 – 12 April 2019) was an English actor.

== Early life ==
Born in Walsall, England, McEnery was the third son of Charles and Mary McEnery (née Brinson). McEnery's father owned a pickle factory, however when the family moved to Brighton when McEnery was a child, he opened a chain of stationery shops. He attended the Dorothy Stringer School before finding work in a nearby department store.

== Career ==
McEnery trained (1962–1964) at the Bristol Old Vic Theatre School, playing, among others, Mosca in Ben Jonson's Volpone and Gaveston in Marlowe's Edward II. At the age of 20 he found his first stage work, spending three seasons with the Everyman Theatre in Liverpool. He joined the National Theatre company in 1966.

His first notable screen role was in 1968 as Mercutio in Franco Zeffirelli's Romeo and Juliet; he was nominated for a BAFTA Award for his performance. He took the title role in the 1970 film Bartleby, in which he starred opposite Paul Scofield. In 1971 he starred in a major role alongside Claude Jade and Jean-Pierre Cassel in Gérard Brach's bittersweet The Boat on the Grass about a girl between two friends. In this film are references to his stage roles when he declaims Hamlet or when he sings in duet with Claude Jade "God Save the Queen". He later played Russian politician Alexander Kerensky in Nicholas and Alexandra (1971). His other film credits include The Duellists, Black Beauty, The Land That Time Forgot (1974) and The Krays (1990, as gangster Eddie Pellam), Mel Gibson's Hamlet (1990), and When Saturday Comes (1996).

In the 1980s, at Sheffield's Crucible Theatre, he took the title role in Gogol's The Government Inspector, directed by the Russian actor and director Oleg Tabakov, also performing on stage in Little Malcolm and His Struggle Against the Eunuchs (Wick Blagdon), Rosencrantz and Guildenstern Are Dead (Hamlet), Nicholas Nickleby (Mr Mantalini/Mr Snevellicci), Waiting for Godot, Curse of the Starving Classes for the RSC, Taking Sides, Precious Bane with Vanessa Redgrave, Coriolanus with Steven Berkoff, and Bingo with Patrick Stewart. In 2011 he appeared as Rowley in The School for Scandal (directed by Deborah Warner) at the Barbican Centre. For television, his credits include Our Mutual Friend, The Scarlet Pimpernel, Little Dorrit, The Buddha of Suburbia, Tusitala (as Robert Louis Stevenson), Jamaica Inn, Confessions of an English Opium-Eater (Thomas De Quincey), and the title role in Caligula A.D. In 2008, he appeared in a guest role in "Sidetracked", the first episode of Wallander.

Joining The Globe Theatre in 1997 for its inaugural productions Henry V (Pistol), and As You Like It (Jaques), over the next ten years he performed in King Lear (The Fool), Richard II (John of Gaunt and The Gardener), Edward II (Archbishop Of Canterbury), Pericles (Pericles), The Merchant of Venice (Shylock), Antony and Cleopatra (Enobarbus), A Mad World my Masters (Master Shortrod Harebrain), A Chaste Maid In Cheapside, and Romeo and Juliet (Mercutio).

In 1998, his play Merry Christmas, Mr. Burbage, written in honour of the 400th anniversary of the creation of the Globe Theatre, was performed at the site of the original Theatre in Shoreditch, a venue from which four centuries earlier the Burbage players had been forced to move, bearing the beams and posts and other remnants which when reassembled south of the Thames would become The Globe. With the support of then artistic director of The Globe, Sir Mark Rylance, the play ended with an ox and cart bearing a pair of oak beams leading a procession through Shoreditch down to the Thames and on to The Globe, where the oaks remain with a dedication to the Burbages.

Later he worked and performed with the Malachites, including performing as Lear at the site of The Rose theatre in 2015, helping preserve the many ties between Shakespeare and Shoreditch, and 'the Actors' Church' St Leonard's, at which his play Raising Burbage was performed, and where his ashes are scattered. Co-founder of the Shakespeare in Shoreditch Society, along with friend and fellow Shoreditch resident Paul Geake, the society's legacy of reviving Shakespeare's spirit in the borough continues with Bard-inspired and infused events, such as the Globe Sonnet Walks, for which John performed Sonnet 129 outside St Leonard's Church.

== Personal life ==
While working at the Everyman, he met actress Stephanie Beacham, whom he later married. The couple had two daughters but subsequently divorced. He has another daughter, artist Celeste Bollack, from a previous relationship with French artist Sofi Bollack.

He had two brothers, the actor Peter McEnery, and the photographer David McEnery.

== Filmography ==
Year	Title	Role	Notes
1965	Othello	Senators-Soldiers-Cypriots	
1968	Romeo and Juliet	Mercutio	
1968	Sleep Is Lovely	John	Possibly lost film
1970	The Lady in the Car with Glasses and a Gun	Yves-Marie aka Philippe	
1970	Bartleby	Bartleby	
1971	The Boat on the Grass	Oliver	
1971	Nicholas and Alexandra	Alexander Kerensky	
1972	The Ragman's Daughter	Old man in wagon	
1973	One Russian Summer	Vadim	
1974	Little Malcolm	Wick Blagdon	
1974	The Land That Time Forgot	Captain Von Schoenvorts	
1975	Galileo	Federzoni	
1976	Schizo	Stephens	Uncredited
1977	The Duellists	Chevalier	
1985	Gulag	Diczek	
1987	Little Dorrit	Captain Hopkins	
1990	The Krays	Eddie Pellam	
1990	The Fool	Mr. Maclean	
1990	Hamlet	Osric	
1991	Prince of Shadows	Walter	
1994	Black Beauty	Mr. York	
1996	When Saturday Comes	Joe Muir	
2003	Girl with a Pearl Earring	Apothecary	

== Television ==
Year	Title	Role	Notes
1975	Origins of the Mafia	Pietro	
1976	Our Mutual Friend	Julius Handford/John Rokesmith	Miniseries
1978	Will Shakespeare	Hamnet Sadler	3 episodes
1978	The Word	Florian Knight	Miniseriess
1979	BBC Play of the Month	Golitsyn	Episode: "Marya"
1979	BBC Television Shakespeare	Lucio	Episode: Measure for Measure
1982	The Life and Adventures of Nicholas Nickleby	Various	4 episodes
1983	Jamaica Inn	Reverend Francis Davey	TV movie
1983	Dramarama	Mr. Burke	Episode: "Bully for Cosmo"
1985	Screen Two	Algernon Swinburne	Episode: "Poppyland"
1985	A.D.	Caligula	5 episodes
1986	Sins	Defense Lawyer	Miniseries
1986	C.A.T.S. Eyes	Hutchins	Episode: "Passage Hawk"
1986	Tusitala	Robert Louis Stevenson	3 episodes
1988	Hard Cases	Alan Richardson	First episode
1988	Codename: Kyril	Loshkevoi	3 episodes
1990	The Plot to Kill Hitler	Dr. Morell	TV movie
1990	Boon	DS Bryant	Episode: "Burning Ambition"
1990–2002	The Bill	Various	6 episodes
1991	Poirot	Colonel Curtiss	Episode: "The Mystery of the Spanish Chest"
1992	Crime Story	DCS Wilf Brooks	Episode: "Dear Roy, Love Gillian"
1993	Doctor Finlay	Douglas Findlater	Episode: "Working Together"
1993	The Buddha of Suburbia	Uncle Ted	Miniseries
1994	Wycliffe	Eprahim Gardner	Episode: "The Gardner"
1995	Chiller	Mr. Keegan	Episode: "Number Six"
1996	Scene	Niko Macrua	Episode: "The Blood That's in You"
1997	Performance	Lord Willoughby	Episode: Richard II
1998	Tess of the D'Urbervilles	Jack Durbeyfield	Miniseries
1998	Merlin	Lord Ardente	2 episodes
1998	The Broker's Man	Alex "Godzilla" Turnbull	5 episodes
2000	Peak Practice	Ken Willett	Episode: "Ghosts"
2000	The Scarlet Pimpernell	Sir William Wetherby	3 episodes
2002	Dalziel and Pascoe	Bill Pascoe	Episode: "The Unwanted"
2003	Waking the Dead	Danny Server	Episode: "Walking on Water Part I"
2005	Elizabeth I	Jesuit Priest	Miniseries
2005–2006	Silent Witness	Det. Supt. Charlie Ferguson	4 episodes
2008	Wallander	Lars Magnusson	Episode: "Sidetracked"
2011	New Tricks	Tony "No Ticket" Hale	Episode: "End of the Line"
