= Alexandra London =

French actress (born 1973)

- Born: 29 April 1973 (age 53); Paris, France
- Occupation: Actress
- Years active: 1989 - present

Alexandra London (born 29 April 1973 in Paris) is a French actress. She has appeared in more than 25 films since 1989.

== Selected filmography ==
Film
| Year | Title | Role | Notes |
|---|---|---|---|
| 2000 | Sentimental Destinies | | |
| 1999 | Why Not Me? | | |
| 1995 | Happiness Is in the Field | | |
| 1994 | Eugénie Grandet | | |
| 1991 | Van Gogh | | |
| 1989 | Les Maris, les Femmes, les Amants | | |
