= The Choice (1976 film) =

1976 film by Jacques Faber

Le Choix
- Directed by: Jacques Faber
- Written by: Jacques Faber; Nanina Zunino
- Starring: Claude Jade; Gilles Kohler
- Cinematography: Jean Rozenbaum
- Music by: Guy Boulanger
- Release date: January 1976
- Running time: 91 minutes
- Country: Belgium / France
- Language: French

Le Choix (The Choice) is a 1976 French-Belgian movie by Jacques Faber starring Claude Jade in a dual role.

An actor (Gilles Kohler) who hesitates between two lookalikes, interpreted by the same actress Claude Jade.

Brussels : Jean-Pierre (Gilles Kohler) is a young stage actor under contract in a theater company from Brussels, where he serves as a kind of "Leading Man". Anne (Claude Jade) his girl friend, is a gentle and quiet woman who dreams of a quiet and uneventful existence, with the children they would design. But Jean-Pierre ignores the antics and freshness of Anne; he does not want such a life. He starts looking for Alain (Georges Lambert), a childhood friend who is in the south of France with a theater troupe. In Nice, Jean-Pierre meets Juliette (also Claude Jade), a dancer from the Opera de Nice. Juliette is a woman completely different to Anne, although they are very similar in some respects. Jean-Pierre is greatly disturbed by the two opposite aspects of the same woman. Finally it will lose one like the other ...

The film was official movie for the Karlovy Vary International Film Festival (Czech Title: "Sen a skutečnost - Dream and Reality")
