= Henri Guybet =

French actor (born 1936)

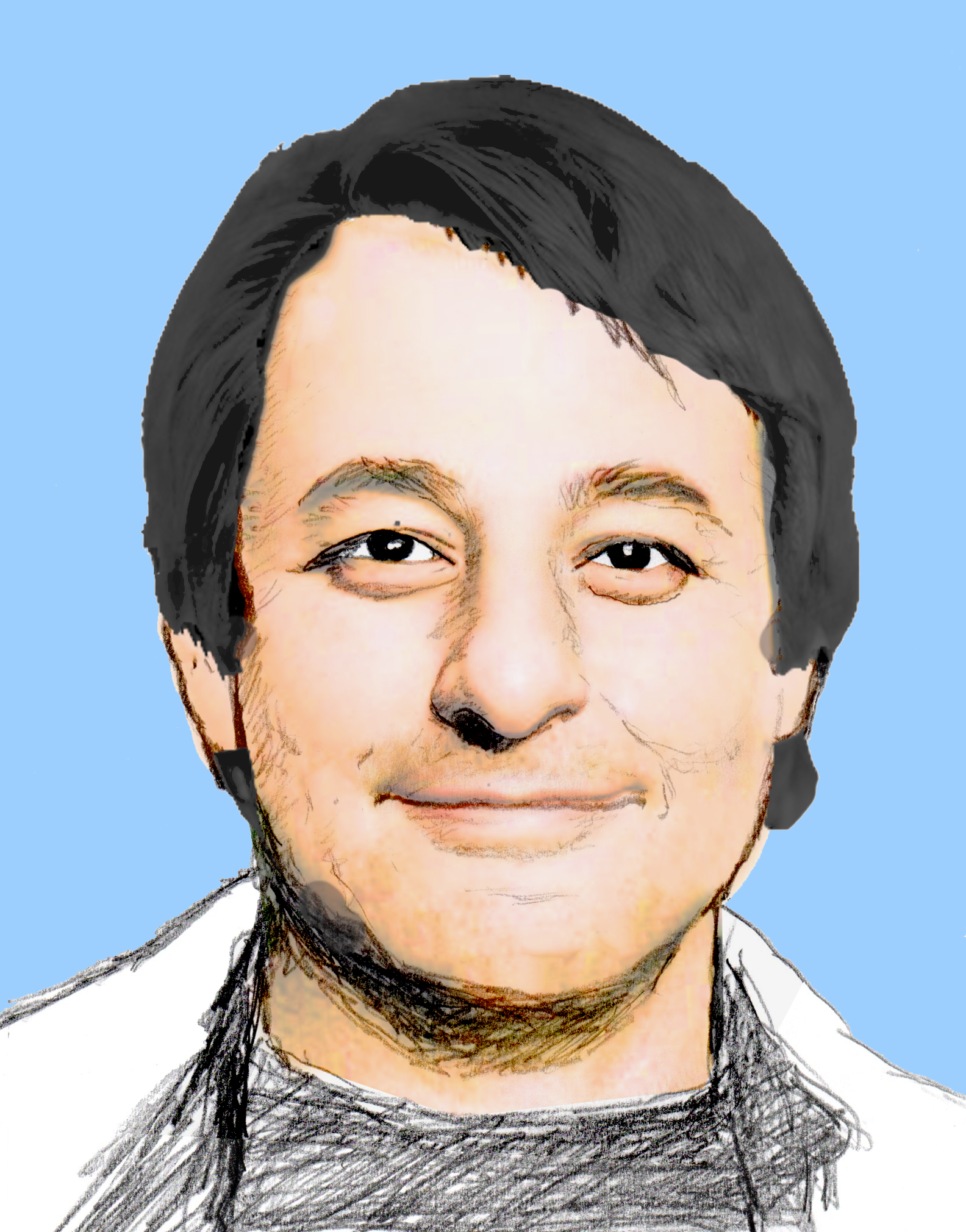
- Henri Guybet in the 80s (pen portrait).
- Born: 21 December 1936 (age 89); Paris, France
- Occupation: Actor
- Years active: 1964-present

Henri Guybet (born 21 December 1936) is a French actor. He has appeared in more than one hundred films since 1964.

Guybet started his career in dinner theater in the Café de la Gare, alongside Coluche and Miou-Miou in late 1960s. Gérard Oury gave him his first major film role in The Mad Adventures of Rabbi Jacob, where he plays Solomon, the Jewish driver of Louis de Funès. His comic talent explodes shortly after with Georges Lautner in Pas de Problème. In 1978 he got the leading role in the film The Pawn, where he played Bertrand Barabi a "pawn" who falls in love for the mother of one of his students, played by Claude Jade. This was his only romantic role and his only lead. In the late 1970s, he made several "nanars" and became a second recurring role. In theater, he became a big name in boulevard theater.

His son is also an actor.

== Selected filmography ==
- 1971: The Married Couple of the Year Two
- 1973: The Mad Adventures of Rabbi Jacob
- 1974: Lucky Pierre
- 1974: The Return of the Tall Blond Man with One Black Shoe
- 1975: Flic Story
- 1978: The Pawn
- 1978: Surprise Sock
- 1978: One Two Two
- 1979: Heroes Are Not Wet Behind the Ears
- 1980: Le Guignolo
- 1981: Schools Falling Apart
- 1982: Le Cadeau
- 1984: Dog Day
- 1987: Club de rencontres
- 2002: If I Were a Rich Man
