= The Other House =

1896 novel by Henry James

- First edition (UK)
- Author: Henry James
- Language: English
- Publisher: William Heinemann, London; Macmillan Company, New York City
- Publication date: Heinemann: 1-Oct-1896; Macmillan: 17-Oct-1896
- Publication place: United Kingdom, United States
- Media type: Print (Serial)
- Pages: Heinemann: volume one, 206 pp; volume two, 202; Macmillan: 388 pp

The Other House is a novel by Henry James, first published as a serial in the Illustrated London News in 1896 and then as a book later the same year. Set in England, this book is something of an oddity in the James canon for its plot revolving around a murder. The novel was originally planned as a play called The Promise. James sketched a scenario for the play in 1893, but it didn't interest theater managers. In 1896 James converted the scenario into The Other House for publication in a popular weekly magazine. He converted the novel back into a play in 1909, but it again failed to be produced.

== Plot summary ==
Julia Bream dies after giving birth to her only child, a daughter named Effie. Julia had a horrible stepmother, so she extracts a promise from her husband Tony never to marry again as long as Effie is alive. Several years pass. Julia's childhood friend Rose Armiger is in love with Tony though she is ostensibly engaged to Dennis Vidal. Tony has grown close to Effie's nanny, Jean Martle, who is herself pursued by Tony's neighbor, Paul Beever. After Jean rejects Paul's marriage proposal, Rose takes Effie on a walk. She returns without Effie, claiming to have left her with Jean. Later Effie's body is found, having drowned in a stream near the home.

Eventually, Rose confesses to drowning the child but everyone decides to conceal the crime. Family physician Dr. Ramage convinces the authorities that Effie died of natural causes and Rose is sent off with Dennis Vidal, all becoming, legally, accessories after the fact to murder.

== Key themes ==
Many have speculated that this strange tale of murder and a cover-up was influenced by Ibsen's grimmer plays. There may be something to this idea, because in the 1890s James came to appreciate Ibsen as his plays became known in England.

James seems to have liked the way he dramatized his material in The Other House. In his Notebooks he plans a section of his novel The Ivory Tower "after the manner in which the first book is a prologue in The Other House. Oh, blest Other House, which gives me thus at every step a precedent, a divine little light to walk by..." But James did not include The Other House in the New York Edition of his fiction (1907–1909), one of the few later novels not to make the cut.

== Critical evaluation ==
Critics have largely dismissed The Other House due to perceived flaws in its character motivation and credibility. Some commentators suggest that reader expectations regarding Henry James's broader body of work, which rarely involves child murder, may have made Rose Armiger's actions appear unconvincing. Critics have argued that Rose hardly seems like the driven, semi-insane, "bad heroine" in the mold of an Ibsen character, but rather as a well-bred young lady whose motivation for the crime lacks credibility.

For a more favorable view of the novel, see the link to the NYRB introduction in "External links" below. This essay begins by characterizing the book as the unfairly selected "ugly duckling" of the Jamesian canon. The author then blames Leon Edel for the novel's unfortunate status, though other critics (see the referenced books of criticism) have also dismissed The Other House as one of James' most forgettable efforts.

Despite its generally low reputation, The Other House has attracted critical attention for its unconventional structure and genre experimentation. José Antonio Álvarez-Amorós describes the novel as “transgeneric,” highlighting its origins in James’s theatrical endeavors and its blending of dramatic and narrative forms.
