= Bilitis (film) =

- Directed by: David Hamilton
- Written by: Robert Boussinot; Catherine Breillat; Jacques Nahum
- Based on: The Songs of Bilitis by Pierre Louÿs
- Produced by: Sylvio Tabet; Malcolm J. Thomson
- Starring: Patti D'Arbanville
- Cinematography: Bernard Daillencourt
- Edited by: Henri Colpi; Claire Painchault; Michel Valio
- Music by: Francis Lai
- Production companies: ECTA Filmproduktion; Les Films 21; Mars International Productions
- Distributed by: SNC
- Release date: 16 March 1977
- Running time: 95 minutes
- Country: France
- Language: French

Bilitis is a 1977 French erotic romantic drama film directed by photographer David Hamilton, with a music score by Francis Lai. It stars Patti D'Arbanville and Mona Kristensen as the title character Bilitis and Melissa, respectively.

The film is loosely based on a poem cycle by Pierre Louÿs entitled The Songs of Bilitis set in ancient Greece, although the film is set in modern Europe. The poems were meant to be autobiographical works by the title character.

== Synopsis ==
Bilitis, a teenage schoolgirl, spends the summer with her aunt Melissa and her unfaithful husband Pierre, a couple whose marriage is strained, and develops a lesbian crush on Melissa. Meanwhile, she pursues Lucas, a local teenage boy, and tries to find a "suitable male lover" for Melissa.

Bilitis' sexual adventure eventually leads to an unhappy result, and she decides to return to school alone.

== Cast ==
- Patti D'Arbanville as Bilitis
- Mona Kristensen as Melissa
- Bernard Giraudeau as Lucas
- Gilles Kohler as Pierre
- Mathieu Carrière as Nikias
- Irka Bochenko as Prudence
- Jacqueline Fontaine as Head Mistress
- Marie-Thérèse Caumont as Sub-Principal
- Germaine Delbat as Principal
- Madeleine Damien as Nanny
- Camille Larivière as Susy
- Catherine Leprince as Helen
- Sabine Froute as Sabine

== Production ==
The film was shot in the same soft focus style that was characteristic of David Hamilton's photography and his other films.

== Companion book ==
In 1977, Hamilton released a photobook, Bilitis, which included the most memorable images from the film.

== Soundtrack charts ==
| Chart (1978) | Peak position |
|---|---|
| Australia (Kent Music Report) | 60 |
