= Los Angeles Opera =

Opera company in Los Angeles, California

Coordinates: 34°03′24″N 118°14′56″W

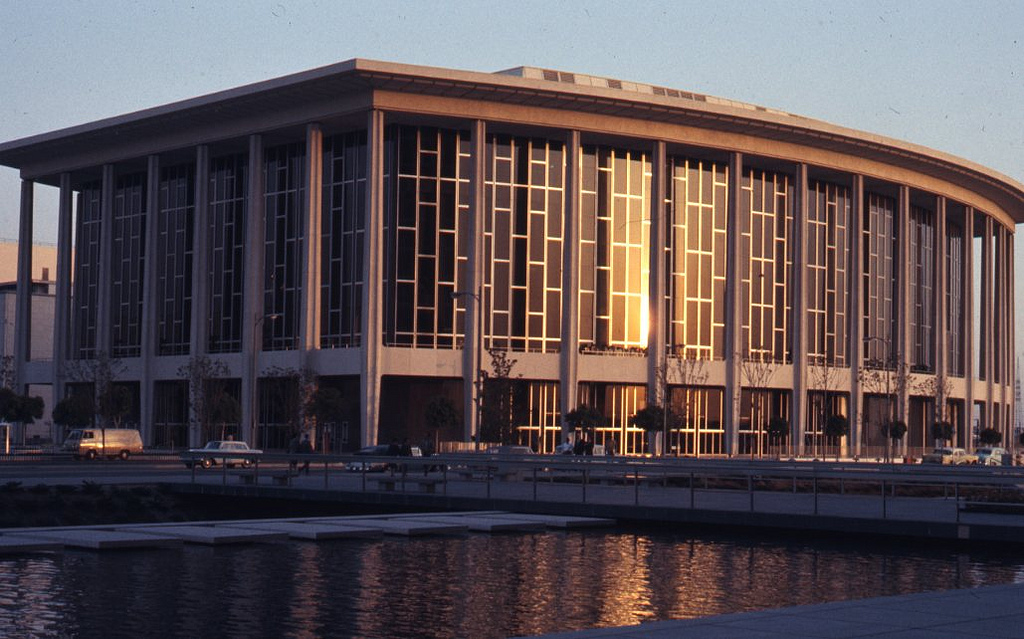
- Dorothy Chandler Pavilion
- Formation: 1986
- Type: Opera company
- Location: Los Angeles, California
- Website: www.laopera.org

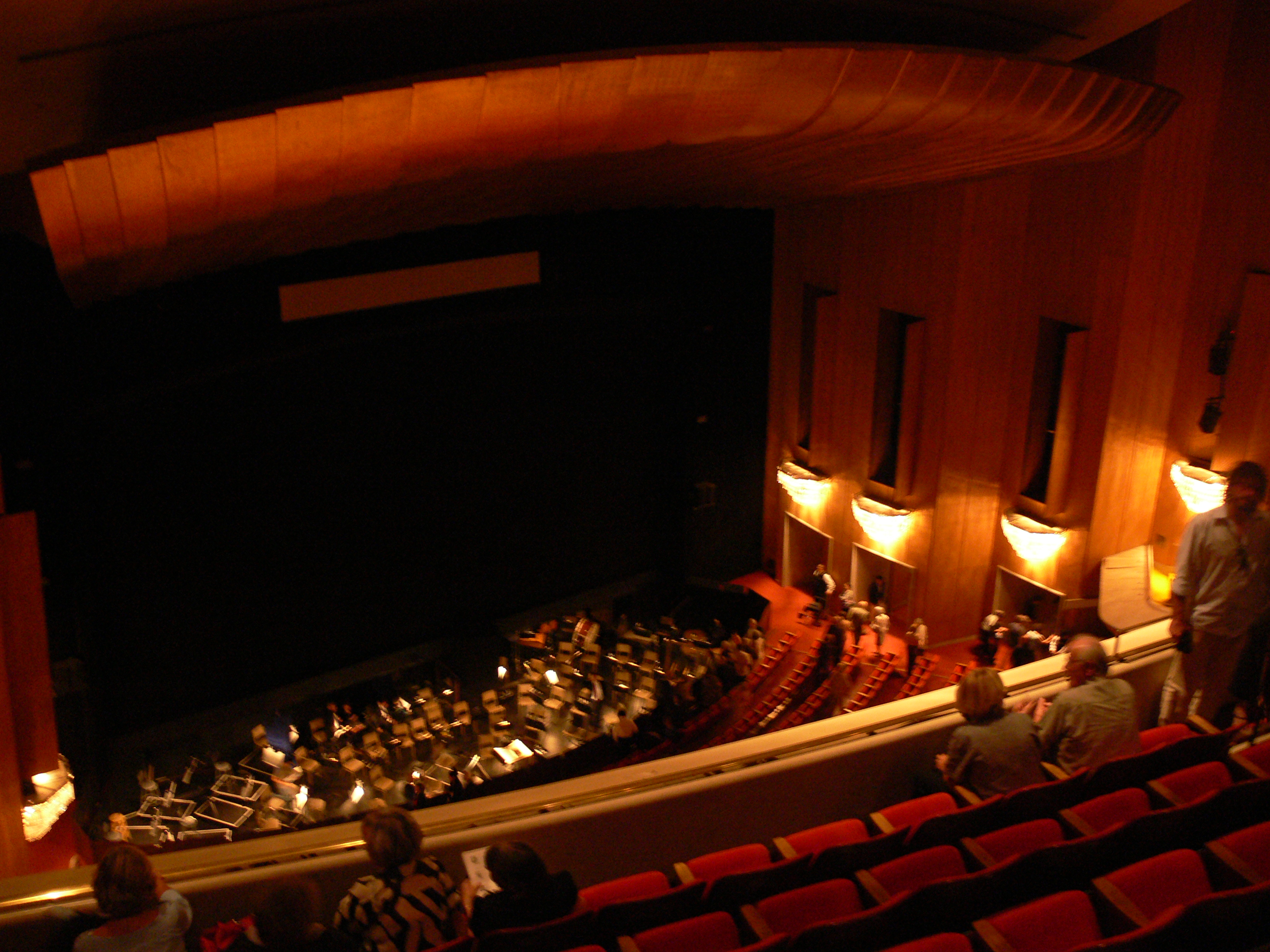
Chandler Pavilion auditorium

The Los Angeles Opera, originally called the Los Angeles Music Center Opera and now styling itself as LA Opera, is an American opera company in Los Angeles, California. It is the fourth-largest opera company in the United States. The company's home base is the Dorothy Chandler Pavilion, part of the Los Angeles Music Center.

== Leadership ==
Peter Hemmings was hired as the company’s inaugural general director in 1984. He retired in 2000.

Spanish tenor and conductor Plácido Domingo was general director of Los Angeles Opera from 2003 to 2019. Domingo sang 31 different roles with the company. He has also conducted 18 different operas and numerous concerts with the company. Domingo resigned in October 2019 following numerous accusations of sexual misconduct. Los Angeles Opera subsequently hired the law firm of Gibson Dunn, under the leadership of former United States Attorney and Superior Court Judge Debra Wong Yang, to conduct an independent investigation of the accusations. After interviewing 44 individuals, Gibson Dunn found that Domingo neither engaged in sexual quid pro quo nor any professional retaliation against women who rebuffed his advances. They also concluded that Los Angeles Opera policies and procedures against sexual harassment were "sufficient on their face," but suggested a number of improvements. Los Angeles Opera accepted the findings and committed to implementing Gibson Dunn’s recommendations.

American conductor James Conlon has been music director since 2006, succeeding Kent Nagano, who held the official title of "principal conductor" from 2001 until 2003 and then became music director from 2003 to 2006. Conlon will step down as music director in 2026, having led more than 500 performances with the company to take on the newly created role of conductor laureate. He will be succeeded as music director by Domingo Hindoyan beginning in the fall of 2026.

Christopher Koelsch has been the president and chief executive officer of Los Angeles Opera since 2012. He previously held the position of senior vice president and chief operating officer since 2010, after serving as vice president for artistic planning. He is the first year-round resident of Los Angeles to lead Los Angeles Opera since 2007.

Grant Gershon was resident conductor from 2012 through 2022, after previously serving as associate conductor/chorus master since 2007. He was succeeded as resident conductor by Lina González-Granados, who recently extended her contract with the company through the end of the 2027/28 season. Previous conductors-in-residence included William Vendice, head of music staff/chorus master, from 1995 to 2007; and Randall Behr, resident conductor, chorus master, and head of music staff from 1988 to 1995.

The company has had two artists in residence: composer/conductor Matthew Aucoin (2016–2020) and tenor Russell Thomas (2020–2024).

== History ==
Los Angeles Opera, which was inaugurated in 1986 with a production of Verdi's Otello starring Plácido Domingo, traces its roots back to the Los Angeles Civic Grand Opera which was formed in 1948. It presented staged productions in a church located in Beverly Hills through the 1950s, funded by furniture maker Francesco Pace. Carol F. Henry, who later served as the Los Angeles Opera president of the board, started volunteering for the Los Angeles Opera League in 1981. Shortly after its third production at the Dorothy Chandler Pavilion, the company abandoned its own production projects and recreated itself as the Music Center Opera Association by bringing opera from other cities to the Music Center, notably San Francisco Opera and the New York City Opera. San Francisco Opera began presenting productions in Los Angeles in 1937 and continued to do so every fall until 1969. The NYCO brought productions to Los Angeles every fall from 1966 to 1982.

In 1984, the Music Center Opera Association hired Peter Hemmings and gave him the task of creating a local opera company which would once again present its own productions. This led to the forming of Los Angeles Opera, originally known as the Los Angeles Music Center Opera. Hemmings stepped down as general director in 2000, with Plácido Domingo, who had been artistic advisor since 1984, assuming leadership of the company the following season. In November 2001, Edgar Baitzel was appointed director of artistic operations. Baitzel was appointed the company's Artistic Director in May 2003 and then its chief operating officer in February 2006. Baitzel died in March 2007. In September 2012, Christopher Koelsch was appointed president and chief executive officer. He previously held the position of senior vice president and chief operating officer since 2010, after serving as vice president for artistic planning.

== Productions of non-standard repertory ==
The company offers productions in the standard operatic repertory as well as new and rarely staged operas. In 2015, Los Angeles Opera presented a new production of The Ghosts of Versailles by John Corigliano, the first major U.S. staging of that opera in 20 years. In 2014, Renée Fleming starred in a production of André Previn's A Streetcar Named Desire. The company presented all three of the "Portrait Trilogy" operas by Philip Glass: Einstein on the Beach (2013), Akhnaten (2016, to be revived in 2025) and Satyagraha (2018).

In 2003, it presented the world premiere of the opera Nicholas and Alexandra, with music composed by Deborah Drattell and text by Nicholas von Hoffman. The 2010–2011 season opened with the world première of Daniel Catán's opera Il Postino, based on the 1994 drama film Il Postino: The Postman, with Domingo as the poet Pablo Neruda, Charles Castronovo in the title role and Grant Gershon conducting. In 2020 it presented the world premiere of Eurydice, composed by Matthew Aucoin with a libretto by Sarah Ruhl.

The company has also frequently turned to the cinema world for directors of its productions. During the 2001–2002 season, it mounted a production of Wagner's Lohengrin, directed by Austrian actor Maximilian Schell and a double bill of Bartók's Bluebeard's Castle and Puccini's Gianni Schicchi, directed by filmmaker William Friedkin. Garry Marshall directed his own adaptation of Jacques Offenbach's La Grande-Duchesse de Gérolstein in 2005. Friedkin returned to direct Richard Strauss's Ariadne auf Naxos in 2004 and, in 2008, the first two parts of Puccini's Il trittico, Il tabarro and Suor Angelica, a production that also featured Woody Allen making his operatic debut staging Gianni Schicchi.

Notable highlights since the company's return to live performances after the Covid-19 theater closures include the West Coast premiere of Omar by Rhiannon Giddens and Michael Abels in 2022, a 2023 staging of El último sueño de Frida y Diego by Gabriela Lena Frank and Nilo Cruz, a major revival of Highway 1, USA by William Grant Still as well as the world premiere of Fire and Blue Sky by Joel Thompson in 2024, and a 2025 staging of Ainadamar by Osvaldo Golijov and David Henry Hwang.

Earlier highlights from the first decade of James Conlon's tenure have included Kurt Weill's Rise and Fall of the City of Mahagonny starring Anthony Dean Griffey, Audra McDonald and Patti LuPone, Rossini's Il turco in Italia starring Nino Machaidze, Simone Alberghini, Paolo Gavanelli and Thomas Allen, and three major works by Benjamin Britten: The Turn of the Screw starring Patricia Racette, Albert Herring starring Alek Shrader in the title role, with Janis Kelly and Christine Brewer sharing the role of Lady Billows, and Billy Budd starring Liam Bonner, Richard Croft and Greer Grimsley.

== Notable guest performers ==
Other frequent and notable guests with the company have included Samuel Ramey, Violeta Urmana, Hildegard Behrens, Denyce Graves, Frederica von Stade, Sumi Jo, Deborah Voigt, James Morris, Rod Gilfry, Jennifer Larmore, Maria Ewing, Susan Graham, Ferruccio Furlanetto, Sondra Radvanovsky, Juan Diego Flórez, Angela Meade, Ana María Martínez, Brandon Jovanovich, Angel Blue, Lisette Oropesa, Lawrence Brownlee, Michael Fabiano and Quinn Kelsey.

== Company programs and features ==
=== Recovered Voices project ===
The company's multi-year project Recovered Voices, begun during the 2006–2007 season, is dedicated to presenting little known operas by the lost generation of composers whose lives and careers were cut short by the Third Reich. To date, the company has presented Alexander von Zemlinsky's Eine florentinische Tragödie (An Italian Tragedy) and Der Zwerg (The Dwarf), the U.S. premiere of Viktor Ullmann's Der zerbrochene Krug (The Broken Jug), Walter Braunfels' Die Vögel (The Birds) and the U.S. premiere of Franz Schreker's Die Gezeichneten (The Stigmatized) as part of this mission, as well as children's performances of Hans Krása's Brundibár. In 2024, Der Zwerg (The Dwarf) was revived in a double bill with Highway 1, USA by William Grant Still.

=== Der Ring des Nibelungen ===
The company presented its first presentation of Richard Wagner's complete Der Ring des Nibelungen in the summer of 2010. New productions of Das Rheingold and Die Walküre were performed in early 2009, followed by Siegfried (September–October 2009) and Götterdämmerung (April 2010). Three full cycles were produced from May 29 through June 26, 2010, accompanied by the citywide Ring Festival LA. The innovative production was directed and designed by German theater artist Achim Freyer and conducted by James Conlon. The principal artists included Linda Watson, Vitalij Kowaljow, Michelle DeYoung, Plácido Domingo, John Treleaven, Graham Clark, Richard Paul Fink, Eric Halfvarson, Alan Held and Jennifer Wilson, among others.

The festival drew criticism from Los Angeles County Supervisor Michael D. Antonovich, who argued that Wagner's work was the "soundtrack to the Holocaust", a reference to Wagner's antisemitic views. Wagner's music was played by guards at concentration camps and through loudspeakers. Antonovich requested that the company broaden the scope of the festival to include other classical and operatic performers, while the company argued that proper attention was made to educate festival-goers on Wagner's racist views, and that broadening the scope would be inappropriate. On a 3–1 vote, the other supervisors rejected Antonovich's motion to have the Los Angeles County Board of Supervisors send a letter to the company to shift the focus away from Wagner.

Subsequently, partly as a result of the cost of producing the Ring, the company requested an emergency $14 million loan from the board of supervisors due to reduced sponsorships and escalating costs. The board approved the loan 4–1, with Antonovich dissenting. In January 2012, LA Opera repaid half of the loan, with the balance repaid in December 2012.

=== Education and community engagement ===
For over 20 years, the company has produced a wide variety of education and outreach programs designed to bring opera to people of all backgrounds, from young children experiencing opera for the first time to experienced opera lovers of all ages. These include "In-School Operas" performed for and by elementary school students; full-scale student matinées and a summer "Opera Camp" for secondary school students; accredited teacher training programs; large-scale, free community performances for families; a popular lecture series for ticket holders before every mainstage performance; and open dress rehearsals for senior centers. In 2008, these programs were enjoyed by an all-time high of more than 159,000 students, teachers and community members.

== Selected recordings ==
- John Corigliano – The Ghosts of Versailles. James Conlon, Patricia Racette, Christopher Maltman, Kristinn Sigmundsson, Joshua Guerrero, Los Angeles Opera. Pentatone PTC 5186538 (2016). OCLC 990269359

== See also ==
- List of North American opera companies
