= Claude Jade =

French actress (1948–2006)

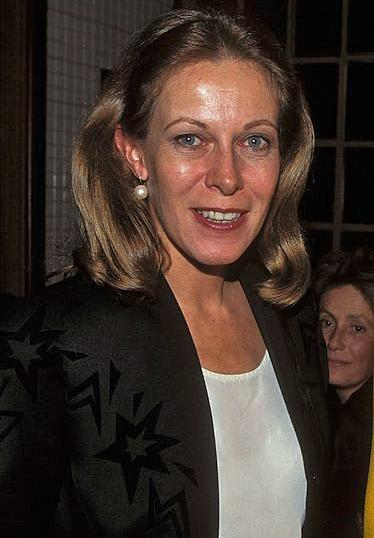
- Born: Claude Marcelle Jorré; 8 October 1948; Dijon, France
- Died: 1 December 2006 (aged 58); Boulogne-Billancourt, France
- Occupation: Actress
- Years active: 1964–2006
- Spouse: Bernard Coste (m. 1972)

Claude Marcelle Jorré, better known as Claude Jade (French: [klod ʒad]; 8 October 1948 – 1 December 2006), was a French actress. She starred as Christine in François Truffaut's three films Stolen Kisses (1968), Bed and Board (1970) and Love on the Run (1979). Jade acted in theatre, film and television. Her film work outside France, where she displays her talent in works such as My Uncle Benjamin (1969), The Boat on the Grass (1971) or The Pawn (1978), has Claude Jade included the Soviet Union, the United States (Alfred Hitchcock's Topaz), Italy, Belgium, Germany and Japan. She was most famous on television as the heroine of the mysterious adventure series The Island of Thirty Coffins (1979). She was also the leading actress in the first French daily soap opera, Cap des Pins (1998–2000). Her last role was playing Célimène in the 2006 theatre play and film Célimène et le cardinal.

== Early life ==
The daughter of university professors, Jade spent three years at Dijon's Conservatory of Dramatic Art. She moved to Paris and became a student of Jean-Laurent Cochet at the Edouard VII theater, and began acting in television productions, including a leading role in TV series Les oiseaux rares.

== Career ==
=== Early work and films with François Truffaut (1960s) ===
While at Dijon's Conservatory of Dramatic Art, in 1964 she played on stage 40 times the part of Agnès in Molière's L'école des femmes. In 1966 she won the Prix de Comédie for Jean Giraudoux's stage play Ondine, performed at the Comédie Boulogne.

While performing as Frida in Pirandello's Henri IV, in a production by Sacha Pitoëff at the Théâtre Moderne, Jade was discovered by New Wave film director François Truffaut. He was "completely taken by her beauty, her manners, her kindness, and her joie de vivre", and cast her in the role of Christine Darbon in Stolen Kisses (Baisers volés, 1968). During the filming, Truffaut fell in love with her, and there was talk of marriage. Truffaut dubbed Claude Jade “French cinema’s little sweetheart” and the director and his muse were soon a couple in real life, although Truffaut changed his mind about marrying her the night before their wedding.

American critic Pauline Kael wrote that Jade "seems a less ethereal, more practical Catherine Deneuve".

Playing the same character at different stages of her life, Jade appeared in three Truffaut films: loved from a distance in Stolen Kisses; married and misled in Bed and Board (Domicile Conjugal, 1970); and divorced but still on good terms in Love on the Run (1979).

Some months after Truffaut's Stolen Kisses Claude Jade starred in Alfred Hitchcock's Topaz (1969), as Michèle Picard, a secret agent's anxious daughter, married to a reporter (Michel Subor). Recommended to Hitchcock by Truffaut, she was 19 years old when cast, with Dany Robin playing her mother. Hitchcock said he chose the two actresses to provide glamor, and later quipped, "Claude Jade is a rather quiet young lady, but I wouldn't guarantee [that] about her behavior in a taxi". Jade recounted that they "talked in a Paris hotel about cooking, and I gave him my recipe for soufflé and told him I liked Strangers on a Train, and that was that."

Hitchcock said she resembled his former star Grace Kelly, and in France she was a younger Danielle Darrieux. Some of her scenes were deleted and restored for the director's cut of Topaz in 1999. Topaz was Jade's only Hollywood film. Universal Pictures offered her a seven-year contract, which she turned down reportedly because she preferred to work in French.

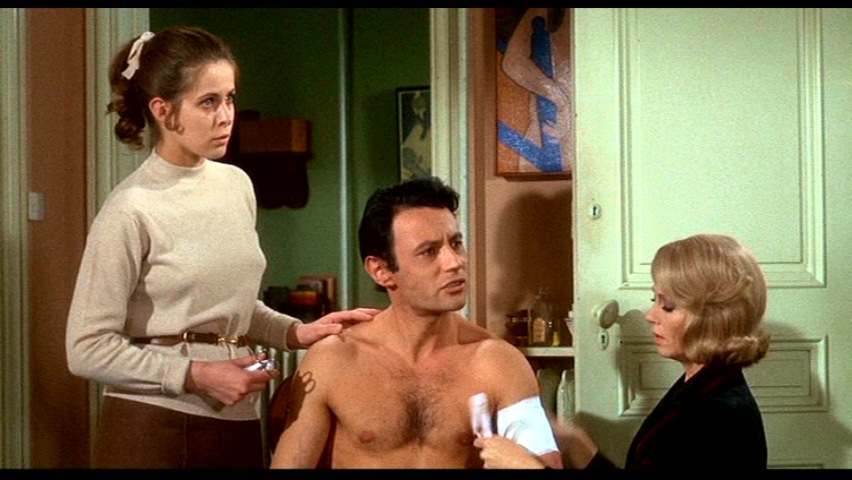
Screenshot from trailer of Hitchcock's Topaz with Claude Jade, Michel Subor and Dany Robin

She had a leading role as Linda in Sous le signe de Monte-Cristo (Under the Sign of Monte Cristo) by André Hunebelle, a modern version of Alexandre Dumas' novel. Here, the 19-year-old actress starred alongside French cinema veterans like Pierre Brasseur and Michel Auclair.

Jade starred in Édouard Molinaro's My Uncle Benjamin (Mon oncle Benjamin, 1969) alongside Jacques Brel. As Manette she refuses Brel's advances until he produces a marriage contract. At the End Manette realizes she prefers happiness to a marriage contract after all.

Her career continued in Belgium, where she played a young English teacher who is fatally intrigued by a murderer (Gérard Barray) in the 1969 film The Witness. Her fiancé in the movie was played by Jean-Claude Dauphin, to whom she was engaged at the time in real life. Also in 1969, she starred as Helena in Le Songe d'une nuit d'été, a made-for-television film adaptation of Shakespeare's A Midsummer Night's Dream directed by Jean-Christophe Averty.

=== 1970s ===
Director Tony Richardson's film Nijinsky (a.k.a. The Dancer) (1970), based on a screenplay by Edward Albee, was canceled during pre-production by producer Harry Saltzman. It was to have starred Jade as Vaslav Nijinsky's wife, with Rudolf Nureyev as Nijinsky and Paul Scofield as his lover Sergei Diaghilev.

In 1970 she reprised her part as Christine from Stolen Kisses in Truffaut's Bed and Board as a married woman. The Truffaut films influenced her type as lovingly gentle modern young woman in contemporary cinema, which she contrasted in ambivalent figures: Critic Vincent Canby praised her work in Gérard Brach's The Boat on the Grass (Le bateau sur l'herbe, 1971), in which she starred as Eleonore, a young girl who comes between two friends (Jean-Pierre Cassel, John McEnery). She starred in Hearth Fires (Les feux de la chandeleur, 1972) as Laura, a daughter who wants to reconcile her parents (Annie Girardot, Jean Rochefort) and who falls in love with her mother's best friend (Bernard Fresson). Alongside Robert Hossein she played the priest's love, Françoise, in Forbidden Priests (Prêtres interdits, 1973). In Home Sweet Home (1973), she played a hardened nurse who is changed by a love affair with a social worker (Jacques Perrin).

Jade starred in three Italian films: Number One (1973), as a private investigator; La ragazza di via Condotti (1973), as Tiffany, the girlfriend of a private eye (Frederick Stafford, her father from Topaz); and A Spiral of Mist (Una spirale di nebbia, 1977), as Maria Teresa, an unhappily married woman, directed by Eriprando Visconti. She played a nun in Kita No Misaki - Cap du Nord (1976) by Japanese director Kei Kumai and played a dual role in The Choice (1976). In the same year, she starred as Penny Vanderwood in Thinking Robots, based on a horror novel by George Langelaan. Among other films of the 1970s were Malicious Pleasure (Le malin plaisir, 1975), Trop c'est trop (1975) and the romantic comedy The Pawn (Le Pion, 1978), in which she starred as a young widow who wins the heart of her son's teacher (Henri Guybet). One year later Claude Jade played the part of Christine Doinel for the third time in Truffaut's Love on the Run.

Screenshot from Claude Jade in Domicile conjugal.

In 1970 she starred as orphan Françoise in the miniseries Mauregard, directed by Truffaut's co-writer Claude de Givray. Other TV roles in the decade were Sheherazade (in Shéhérazade), Louise de La Vallière (in Le chateau perdu), and Lucile Desmoulins (in La passion de Camille et Lucile Desmoulins). She starred in such television movies as Mamie Rose, La Mandragore, Monsieur Seul, Fou comme François, Les anneaux de Bicêtre, Ulysse est revenu, and, in her biggest success of that decade, The Island of Thirty Coffins (L'île aux trente cercueils), a 1979 series in which she portrayed heroine Veronique d'Hergemont.

=== 1980s ===
In the 1980s, Jade moved to Moscow for three years with her husband Bernard Coste, a French diplomat, and her son Pierre Coste (born 1976). She starred in two Soviet films. In Teheran 43 (1981), she played the mysterious terrorist Françoise, with Alain Delon and an international cast. For Sergei Yutkevich's Lenin in Paris (1981), she played the French Bolshevik Inessa Armand, but without the rumored love affair with Vladimir Lenin.

Among her other film roles in the 1980s were the arrested philosophy prof in Schools Falling Apart (Le Bahut va craquer, 1981), the lawyer Valouin in A Captain's Honor (L'honneur d'un capitaine, 1982), the Vicki Baum-heroine Evelyne Droste in Rendezvous in Paris (1982) and the mysterious Alice in René Féret's thriller The Man Who Wasn't There (L'homme qui n'était pas là, 1987).

She also appeared in TV movies, such as the thriller La grotte aux loups (1980); the drama Nous ne l'avons pas assez aimée (1980); Treize (1981); a dual role in Lise et Laura (1982); A Girl in the Sunflowers (1984); the Italian miniseries Voglia di volare (1984); the French-Spanish-Canadian-German miniseries Le grand secret (1989) and in episode L'amie d'enfance of the series Commissaire Moulin.

=== 1990s ===
During the 1990s Jade worked mainly in television, such as the TV series La tête en l'air and Fleur bleue, as guest star in Une femme d'honneur (ep.Mémoire perdue), Inspecteur Moretti (ep. Un enfant au soleil), Julie Lescaut (ep. Rumeurs) and Navarro (ep. Sentiments mortels). TV movies included L'Éternité devant soi, Le bonheur des autres, Eugénie Grandet and Porté disparu. From 1998 to 2000 she was the lead actress in the series Tide of Life (Cap des Pins). Her last U.S. acting part was a guest appearance on The Hitchhiker: in the episode Windows she is Monique, who shoots her neighbor David Marshall Grant at the end.

Jade's film roles in cinemas in 1990s included Gabrielle Martin, a mother betrayed by her husband, in Tableau d'honneur. This was followed by her performance as shy lesbian Caroline in Jean-Pierre Mocky's Bonsoir. In 1998, she played a governor's wife, Reine Schmaltz, who saves herself on a lifeboat in the historical movie The Raft of the Medusa (Le Radeau de la Méduse, 1998).

=== 2000s ===
In her last decade, Jade's work included the TV movie Sans famille (2000); the series La Crim (episode "Le secret" in 2004), and Groupe Flag (episode "Vrai ou faux" in 2005). She also appeared in an episode of the short film series Drug Scenes (Scénarios sur la drogue, episode "La rampe", 2000); and in the short À San Remo (2004).

=== Theatrical work ===
Jade was a member of Jean Meyer's theatre company in Lyon, appearing in plays by Jean Giraudoux (Helena in The Trojan War Will Not Take Place, and Isabelle in Intermezzo); Henry de Montherlant (Port Royal); James Joyce (The Exiles); Racine (Britannicus); and Balzac (Le Faiseur). She took roles in plays by Vladimir Volkoff (The Interrogation); Catherine Decours (Regulus 93); Michel Vinaver (Dissident il va sans dire), Alfred de Musset (Lorenzaccio) and others. She worked onstage in Lyon, Nantes, Dijon and Paris.

Many plays were adapted for TV, such as her performances as Helena in Shakespeares Midsummer Night's Dream; her Sylvie in Marcel Aymés Les oiseaux de lune; her Colomba in Jules Romains's adaptation of Ben Johnson's Volpone; her Clarisse in Jacques Deval's Il y a longtemps que je t'aime; her title role in Jules Supervielle's Shéhérazade; and her Louise de La Vallière in Le château perdu. Her last stage role was as Célimène in Jacques Rampal's Celimene and the Cardinal.

== Later life and death ==
Jade published her autobiography Baisers envolés in 2004.

On 1 December 2006, Jade died of uveal melanoma, which had metastasised to metastatic liver disease. She wore a prosthetic eye in Celimene and the Cardinal, her last stage performance, in August 2006.

== Awards ==
Jade won an award in 1970 for "Révelation de la Nuit du cinéma", and in 1975 she received the Prix Orange at the Cannes Film Festival. Her contributions to French culture were recognised in 1998, when was named a knight in the Légion d'honneur. In 2000 she won the New Wave Award at Palm Beach International Film Festival for her "trend-setting role in the world cinema", followed in 2002 by the Prix Reconnaissance des Cinéphiles in Puget-Théniers.

== Legacy ==
In 2013, a street in Dijon was named after Claude Jade: Allée Claude Jade, 21000 Dijon.

== Selected filmography ==
Year	Title	Role	Director	Notes
1968	Stolen Kisses	Christine Darbon	François Truffaut	
1968	Sous le signe de Monte-Cristo	Linda	André Hunebelle	
1969	Les oiseaux rares	Sylvie	Jean Dewever	TV series
1969	The Witness	Cécile	Anne Walter	
1969	My Uncle Benjamin	Manette	Édouard Molinaro	
1969	Topaz	Michèle Picard	Alfred Hitchcock	
1970	Bed and Board	Christine Doinel	François Truffaut	
1970	Mauregard	Françoise	Claude de Givray	
1971	The Boat on the Grass	Éléonore	Gérard Brach	
1971	Le Songe d'une nuit d'été	Helena	Jean-Christophe Averty	
1971	Sheherazade	Shéhérazade	Pierre Badel	
1972	Hearth Fires	Laura Boursault	Serge Korber	
1972	La Mandragore	Lucretia	Philippe Arnal	
1973	Number One	Sybil Boisset	Gianni Buffardi	
1973	Home Sweet Home	Mademoiselle Claire	Benoît Lamy	
1973	Special Killers (La ragazza di via Condotti)	Tiffany	German Lorente	
1973	Forbidden Priests	Françoise Bernardeau	Denys de La Patellière	
1975	Malicious Pleasure	Julie	Bernard Toublanc-Michel	
1975	Trop c'est trop	Patricia	Didier Kaminka	
1975	The Choice	Anne / Juliette	Jacques Faber	
1976	Ma Mie Rose	Agathe	Pierre Goutas	
1976	Cape of North	Marie-Thérèse	Kei Kumai	
1976	Le Collectionneur de cerveaux	Penny Vanderwood	Michel Subiela	
1977	Les anneaux de Bicêtre	Blanche	Louis Grospierre	
1977	A Spiral of Mist	Maria Teresa	Eriprando Visconti	
1978	The Pawn	Dominique Benech	Christian Gion	
1978	Fou comme François	Luce	Gérard Chouchan	
1979	Love on the Run	Christine Doinel	François Truffaut	
1979	The Island of Thirty Coffins	Véronique d'Hergemont	Marcel Cravenne	TV series
1980	La grotte aux loups	Solange	Bernard Toublanc-Michel	
1980	Nous ne l'avons pas assez aimée	Gisèle	Patrick Antoine	
1981	Le bahut va craquer	Mlle Ferrand	Michel Nerval	
1981	Commissaire Moulin: L'amie d'enfance	Isabelle Mencier	Jean Kerchbron	
1981	Teheran 43	Françoise	Alexandre Alov and Vladimir Naoumov	
1981	Lenin in Paris	Inès Armand	Serguei Youtkhevitch	
1982	Lise et Laura	Lise / Laura	Henri Helman	
1982	Rendezvous in Paris	Évelyne Droste	Gabi Kubach	
1982	A Captain's Honor	Maître Valouin	Pierre Schoendoerffer	
1984	Voglia di volare	Barbara	Pier Giuseppe Murgia	
1984	Une petite fille dans les tournesols	Marelle	Bernard Férié	
1987	L'homme qui n'était pas là	Alice	René Féret	
1987	Qui sont mes juges?	Marianne	André Thiéry	
1989	Le grand secret	Suzan Frend	Jacques Trébouta	
1990	The Hitchhiker: Windows	Monique	René Manzor	
1990	Le Bonheur des autres	Agnès Jalamet	Charles Bitsch	
1992	Tableau d'honneur	Gabrielle Martin	Charles Nemes	
1993	Eugénie Grandet	Lucienne des Grassins	Jean-Daniel Verhaeghe	
1993	La tête en l'air	Sylvie Guyot	Marlène Bertin	TV series
1994	Bonsoir	Caroline Winberg	Jean-Pierre Mocky	
1995	Julie Lescaut: Rumeurs	Estelle Toulouse	Marion Sarraut	
1995	Porté disparu	Hélène	Jacques Richard	
1998	Le Radeau de la Méduse	Reine Schmaltz	Iradj Azimi	
1998	Une femme d'honneur: Mémoire perdue	Madeleine Trobert	Michèle Hauteville	
1998	Tide of Life	Anna Chantreuil	Nicolas Cohen	TV series 1998–2000
2000	Sans famille	Belle Dame	Jean-Daniel Verhaeghe	
2000	Drug Scenes: La Rampe	Elle	Santiago Otheguy	
2003	À San Remo	Michèle	Julien Donada	short
2004	La Crim': Le secret	Armande de Montcourtet	Dominique Guillo	
2005	Groupe Flag: Vrai ou faux	Emma Nazarov	Éteinne Dhaene	
2006	Célimène et le cardinal	Célimène	Jacques Rampal	filmed play
