= Louis Bernier =

French architect

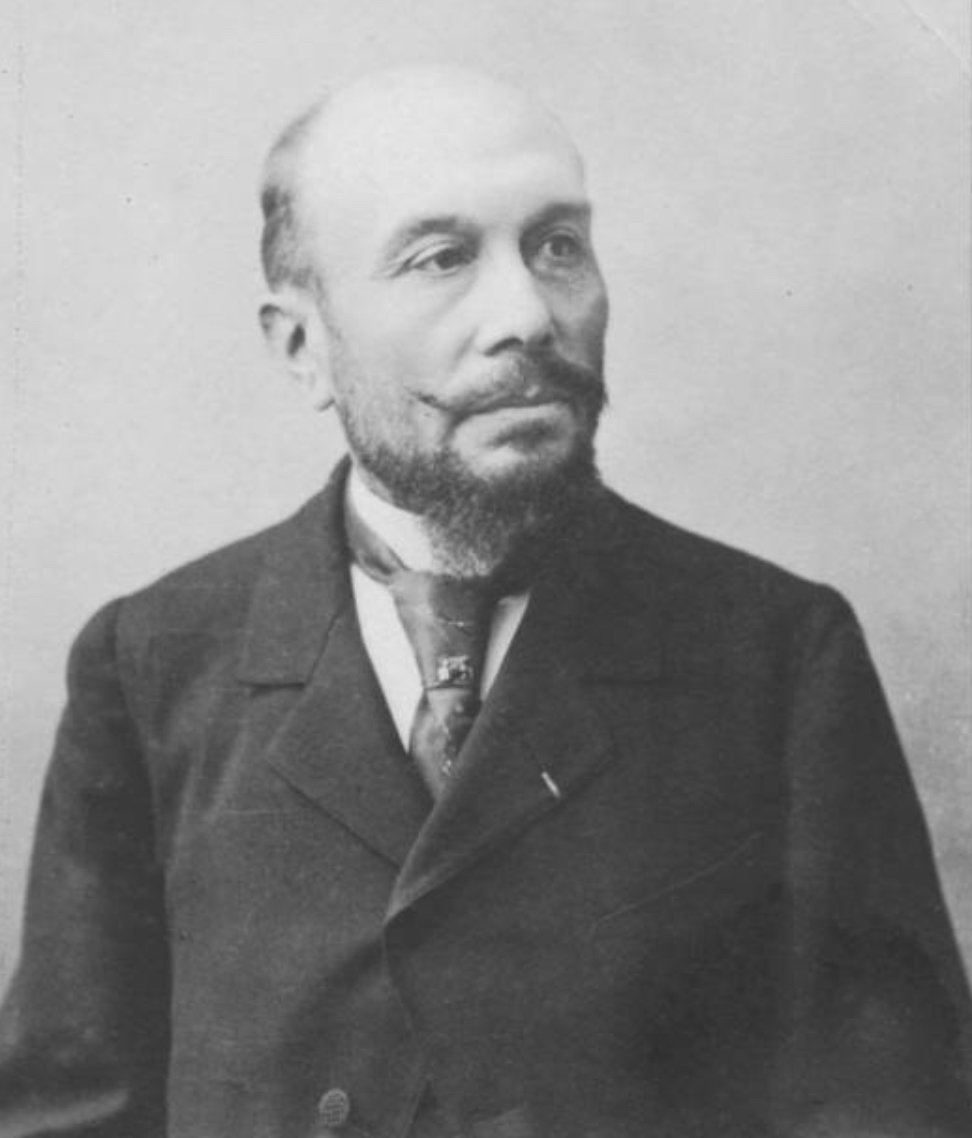
Louis Bernier, c. 1893

Stanislas-Louis Bernier (French pronunciation: [stanislas lwi bɛʁnje]; 21 February 1845 – 2 February 1919) was a French architect.

== Biography ==
Born in Paris, Bernier entered the École Nationale Supérieure des Beaux-Arts in 1864 as a student of Honoré Daumet. Twice a finalist in the competition for the Prix de Rome, he won the first grand prize in 1872 for a natural history museum project. He stayed at the Académie de France in Rome from 1873 to 1877. The principal design he sent from Rome consisted of an ambitious restoration of the Mausoleum at Halicarnassus (1877).

Back in Paris in 1878, he joined the government bureaucracy as an architect for the Conseil Général des Bâtiments Civils. He succeeded Georges-Ernest Coquart as the architect of the École des Beaux-Arts in 1890. In addition to maintaining the buildings erected by Félix Duban between 1832 and 1864, he also built there a monument to Duban which paraphrased Duban's architectural style.

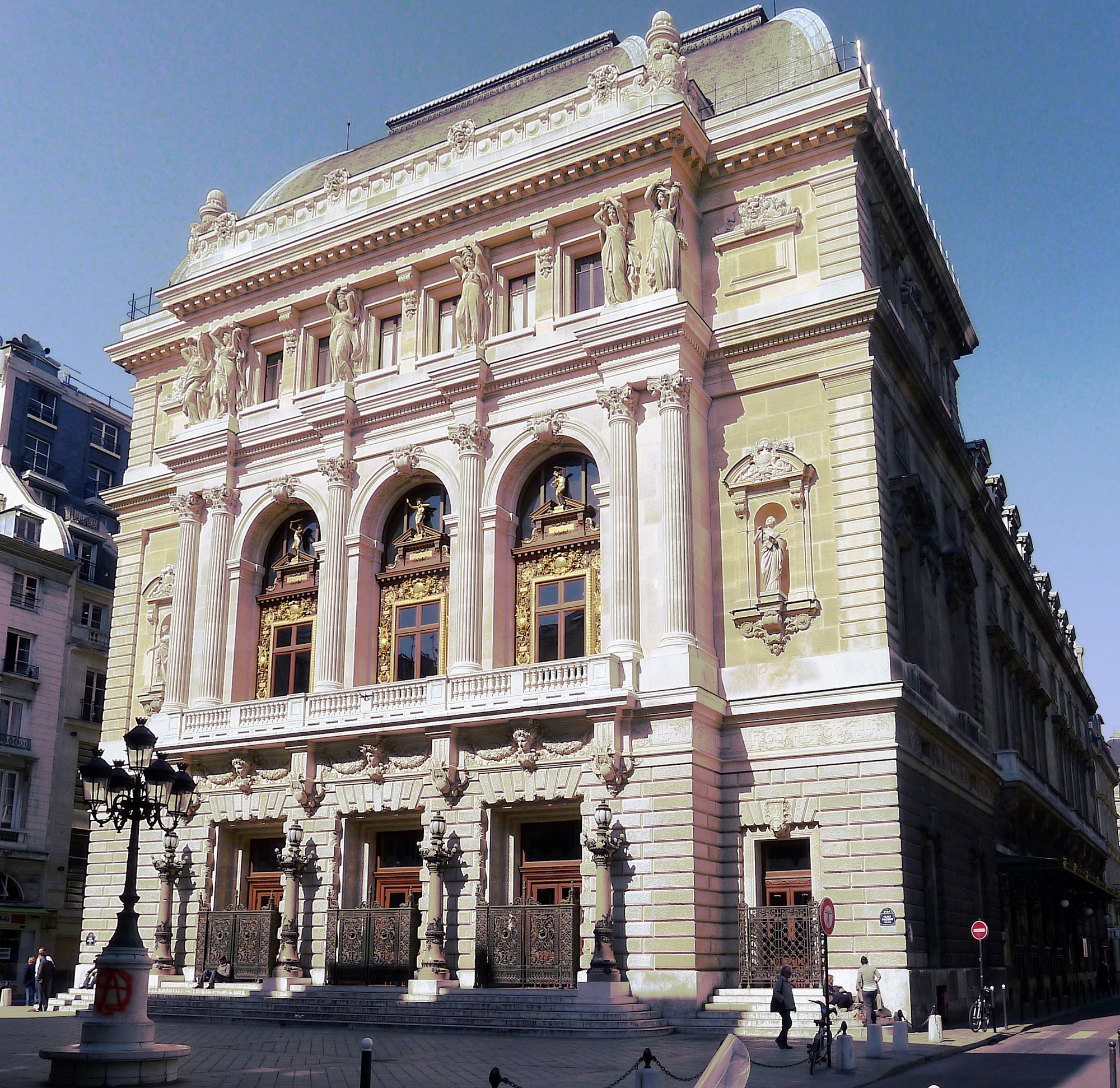
Salle Favart in Paris

Bernier's major work is the Opéra-Comique theatre, the Salle Favart, which needed to be rebuilt following an 1887 fire. He obtained the commission by winning a competition judged by five winners of the Grand Prix de Rome (including Charles Garnier), which ensured the design would reflect academic and official tastes. Because of disputes within the profession, more avant-garde architects did not participate. Built from 1893 to 1898, the theatre is typical Beaux-Arts architecture. The facade is an adaptation of Garnier's design for the Opéra, and the elaborate exterior and interior decoration shows the influence of both Garnier and Daumet.

In 1898, Bernier was elected to the Académie des Beaux-Arts (in seat number 3 of the architecture section). He led an official workshop of the École des Beaux-Arts from 1905 to 1919 and was president of the Société Centrale des Architectes Français from 1911 to 1914.

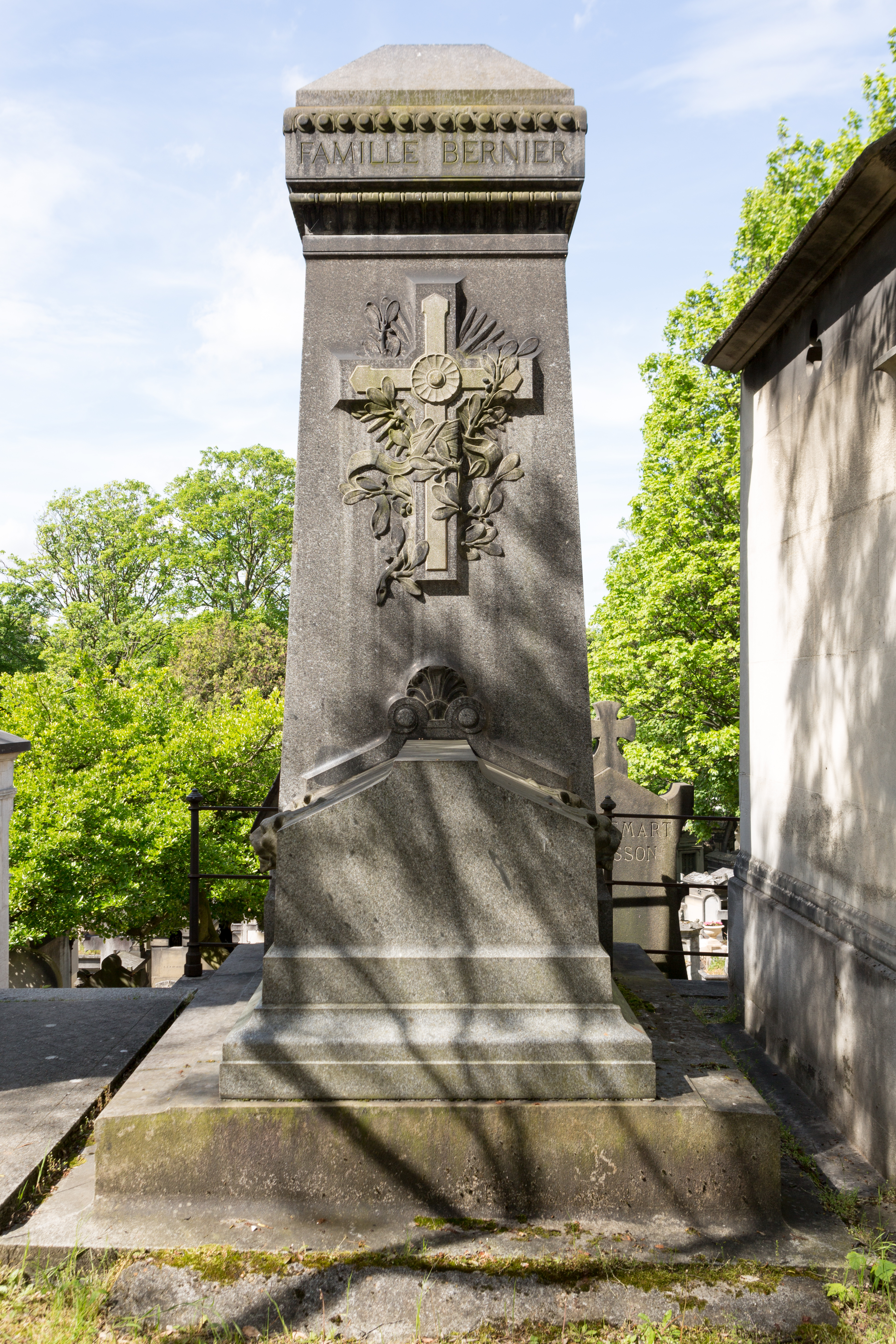
Grave at Cimetière du Père-Lachaise.

Bernier died in Paris and is buried at Père-Lachaise Cemetery (68th division). A bibliophile, he bequeathed his collection of ancient works to the Musée Condé located at Chantilly, Oise.

His name was given to a square in Paris in the Batignolles district.

== Main work ==
- 1893–1898: theatre of the Opéra-Comique, listed as a French Historical Monument in 1977.

== Bibliography ==
- Ayers, Andrew (2004). The Architecture of Paris. Stuttgart; London: Edition Axel Menges. ISBN 9783930698967.
- Mead, Christopher Curtis (1996). "Bernier, Stanislas-Louis", vol. 3, pp. 826–827, in The Dictionary of Art, edited by Jane Turner. London: Macmillan. ISBN 9781884446009. Also at Oxford Art Online (subscription required).
- Pénanrun, David de; Roux, François; Delaire, Edmond (1907). "BERNIER Stanislas-Louis", p. 177 in Les architectes élèves de l'École des Beaux-Arts (1793–1907), 2nd edition. Librairie de la construction moderne.
