= Francis Perrin (actor) =

French actor, screenwriter, and director (born 1947)

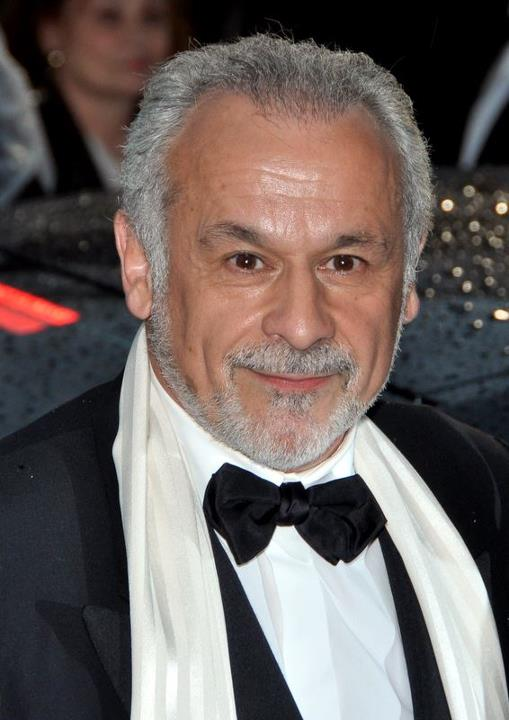
- Perrin at the 2012 Cannes Film Festival
- Born: 10 October 1947 (age 78); Versailles, France
- Occupations: Actor, director, screenwriter
- Years active: 1971–present
- Spouse: Gersende Dufromentel (2002-present)
- Children: 6

Francis Pierre Horton Perrin (born 10 October 1947) is a French actor, screenwriter and director.

== Career ==
He entered the Comédie-Française in 1972, but left the following year.

He headed the Théâtre Montansier in his birthplace from 1992 to 2000.

In 2001, he was made Officier de l'ordre national du Mérite, in 2007 Officier de la Légion d'honneur and in 2016, Officier des Arts et Lettres.

== Theater ==
Year	Title	Author	Director	Notes
1971	Arsenic and Old Lace	Joseph Kesselring	Alfred Pasquali	
1972	Cœur à deux	Guy Foissy	Jean-Pierre Miquel	
1972	Les chemins de fer	Eugène Labiche	Daniel Georgeot	
1972	Le Bourgeois gentilhomme	Molière	Jean-Louis Barrault	
1972–1973	The Imaginary Invalid	Molière	Jean-Laurent Cochet	
1973	Le Médecin volant	Molière	Francis Perrin	
1973	Scapin the Schemer	Molière	Jacques Échantillon	
1973	Les Femmes Savantes	Molière	Jean Piat	
1973	Une rose au petit déjeuner	Pierre Barillet & Jean-Pierre Grédy	René Clermont	
1973–1974	Citron automatique	Francis Perrin	Francis Perrin	
1975	Turcaret	Alain-René Lesage	Serge Peyrat	
1975	Tutti-Frutti	Francis Perrin	Francis Perrin	
1975	Trésor party	Bernard Régnier	Jacques Ardouin	
1975	The Creation of the World and Other Business	Arthur Miller	Jean Mercure	
1976	Am-stram-gram	André Roussin	Claude Nicot	
1976	Play It Again, Sam	Woody Allen	Francis Perrin	
1978	Les Deux Timides	Eugène Labiche & Marc Michel	Jean Le Poulain	
1978–1979	Scapin the Schemer	Molière	Pierre Boutron	
1979	L'escrime ne paie pas	Jean-Claude Islert	Francis Perrin	
1980	J'suis bien	Gérard Lamballe	Francis Perrin	
1983	Le Dindon	Georges Feydeau	Jean Meyer	
1985	Glengarry Glen Ross	David Mamet	Marcel Maréchal	
1988	Scapin the Schemer	Molière	Marcelle Tassencourt	
1988	Glengarry Glen Ross	David Mamet	Marcel Maréchal	
1988	Mon panthéon est décousu	Pierre Delanoë, Gérard Lamballe & Francis Perrin	Francis Perrin	
1989	Pâquerette	Claude Magnier	Francis Perrin	
1989	The Marriage of Figaro	Pierre Beaumarchais	Francis Perrin	
1990	Les Précieuses ridicules	Molière	Francis Perrin	
1991	Volpone	Jules Romains	Robert Fortune	
1992	Play It Again, Sam	Woody Allen	Francis Perrin	
1993	The Barber of Seville	Gioachino Rossini	Francis Perrin	
1993–1994	Topaze	Marcel Pagnol	Francis Perrin	
1994	Bonne année toi-même	Pauline Daumale	Francis Perrin	
1994–1995	Célimare le bien-aimé	Eugène Marin Labiche	Jean-Louis Thamin	
1995	Knock	Jules Romains	Francis Perrin	
1995	To Be or Not to Be	Ernst Lubitsch	Jean-Paul Bouron	
1996	Oscar	Claude Magnier	Pierre Mondy	
1996	Les Précieuses ridicules	Molière	Francis Perrin	
1996	L'Impromptu de Versailles	Molière	Francis Perrin	
1997	Les Fâcheux	Molière	Francis Perrin	
1997	Le Passe-muraille	Marcel Aymé	Alain Sachs	
1997	Le Médecin volant	Molière	Francis Perrin	
1997	Programme minimum	Guy Montagné	Francis Perrin	
1997	George Dandin ou le Mari confondu	Molière	Francis Perrin	
1998	Jean III	Sacha Guitry	Francis Perrin	
1998	Hunger and Thirst	Eugène Ionesco	Jean-Claude Idée	
1998	The Barber of Seville	Gioachino Rossini	Francis Perrin	
1999	Funny Money	Ray Cooney	Éric Civanyan	
1999	Scapin the Schemer	Molière	Francis Perrin	
2000	La Main passe	Georges Feydeau	Gildas Bourdet	
2001	Volpone	Jules Romains	Francis Perrin	
2002	Le Dindon	Georges Feydeau	Francis Perrin	
2002	Amphitryon	Molière	Simon Eine	
2003	Signé Dumas	Cyril Gely & Éric Rouquette	Jean-Luc Tardieu	Nominated - Molière Award for Best Actor
2004	Play It Again, Sam	Woody Allen	Francis Perrin	
2005	Auntie and Me	Morris Panych	Stéphan Meldegg	
2005	Un fil à la patte	Georges Feydeau	Francis Perrin	
2006	La Crampon	Guy Montagné & Sylvie Raboutet	Francis Perrin	
2006	Ce soir ou jamais	Philippe Hodara & Bruno Chapelle	Francis Perrin	
2006	Si c'était à refaire	Laurent Ruquier	Jean-Luc Moreau	
2006	Trois jeunes filles nues	Raoul Moretti, Yves Mirande & Albert Willemetz	Francis Perrin	
2006–2008	Numéro complémentaire	Jean-Marie Chevret	Alain Sachs	
2007–2008	La Dame de chez Maxim	Georges Feydeau	Francis Perrin	
2007–2009	Caught in the Net	Ray Cooney	Jean-Luc Moreau	
2008	La Véranda	Cyril Gely & Éric Rouquette	Francis Perrin	
2009	Rigoletto	Giuseppe Verdi	Francis Perrin	
2011	Dom Juan	Molière	Francis Huster	
2011	Le Nombril	Jean Anouilh	Michel Fagadau	
2011	Je hais les jeunes	Patrice Laffont	Francis Perrin	
2012	The Misanthrope	Molière	Francis Huster	
2012–2013	Un stylo dans la tête	Jean Dell	Jean-Luc Moreau	
2013	Cava's Barber	Patrice Peyriéras	Francis Perrin	
2013–2017	Molière malgré moi	Francis Perrin	Francis Perrin	
2014	Comme un arbre penché	Lilian Lloyd	Jean-Luc Tardieu	
2019	Same Time, Next Year	Bernard Slade	Francis Perrin	

== Filmography ==
=== Actor ===
Year	Title	Role	Director	Notes
1972	Les Boussardel		René Lucot	TV mini-series
1973	Le concierge	The new concierge	Jean Girault	
1973	Woman Buried Alive	Gael	Aldo Lado	
1974	The Slap	Marc Morillon	Claude Pinoteau	
1974	The Three Musketeers	D'Artagnan	John Halas & Franco Cristofani	
1974	On s'est trompé d'histoire d'amour	Pierre Buzac	Jean-Louis Bertuccelli	
1975	Serious as Pleasure	The car seller	Robert Benayoun	
1975	C'est dur pour tout le monde	Dan Letellier	Christian Gion	
1976	The Twist	Robert Sartre	Claude Chabrol	
1976	The Porter from Maxim's	Octave	Claude Vital	
1976	Le siècle des lumières	Figaro	Claude Brulé	TV movie
1977	The Blue Ferns	Antoine	Françoise Sagan	
1977	Le mille-pattes fait des claquettes	Jacques	Jean Girault	
1977	Turlututu	Baptiste Favart	François Chatel	TV movie
1977	C'est arrivé à Paris	The doorman	François Villiers	TV movie
1977	Cinéma 16		Nina Companeez	TV series (1 episode)
1978	Robert et Robert	Francis Michaud	Claude Lelouch	
1978	Un ours pas comme les autres	Freddy	Nina Companeez	TV mini-series
1979	Gros-Câlin	The taxi driver	Jean-Pierre Rawson	
1980	Jupiter's Thigh	Charles-Hubert Pochet	Philippe de Broca	
1980	Un amour d'emmerdeuse	Maxime	Alain Vandercoille	
1980	Le barbier de Séville	Figaro	Jean Pignol	TV movie
1980	Antenne à Francis Perrin	Perdican / Jeff / Pierrot ...	Jean Kerchbron	TV show
1981	Le roi des cons	Georges Le Roi	Claude Confortès	
1981	Le mythomane	Norbert Beaufumé	Michel Wyn	TV series (6 episodes)
1982	Tête à claques	Alex Berthier	Francis Perrin	
1982	Le corbillard de Jules	Alphonse	Serge Pénard	
1982	La folle histoire de Francis Perrin	Himself	Jean-Claude Longin	TV show
1983	Tout le monde peut se tromper	Ludovic Vincent	Jean Couturier	
1984	Le joli coeur	Frank	Francis Perrin	
1985	Billy Ze Kick	Inspector Chapeau	Gérard Mordillat	
1985	Ça n'arrive qu'à moi	François Pépin	Francis Perrin	
1986	Le débutant	François Veber	Daniel Janneau & Francis Perrin	
1987	Club de rencontres	Nicolas Bergereau	Michel Lang	
1988	Loft story	Francis	Stéphane Bertin & Boramy Tioulong	TV series (42 episodes)
1990	Présumé dangereux	Durieux	Georges Lautner	
1991–1995	Maxime et Wanda	Maxime	Henri Helman, Claude Vital, ...	TV series (3 episodes)
1993	La braconne	Arthur	Serge Pénard	
1993–1998	Inspecteur Médeuze	Inspector Medeuze	Philippe Triboit, Étienne Méry, ...	TV series (6 episodes)
1995	Une aspirine pour deux	Allan Felix	Serge Pénard	TV movie
1996	La Belle Verte	Angry BMW driver	Coline Serreau	
1997	Miracle à l'Eldorado	André Trapani	Philippe Niang	TV movie
2000	L'enfant de la honte	Prefect Joubain	Claudio Tonetti	TV movie
2001–2003	The New Adventures of Lucky Luke	Rantanplan	Olivier Jean-Marie	TV series (52 episodes)
2002	Sentiments partagés	Luc	Daniel Janneau	TV movie
2002	Juliette Lesage, médecine pour tous	Gérard Maillant	Christian François	TV series (1 episode)
2004	Les parisiens	Didier	Claude Lelouch	
2004	Sœur Thérèse.com	Alain Carlier	Didier Grousset	TV series (1 episode)
2005	Le courage d'aimer	Didier	Claude Lelouch	
2006	Peter Pan a grandi et John Lennon est mort		Alexandre Charlet	Short
2007	Lune de miel		François Breniaux	Short
2007	Trois contes merveilleux	Cook 1	Hélène Guétary	TV movie
2009	Clara, une passion française	Crémieux	Sébastien Grall	TV movie
2010	Insoupçonnable	Antoine	Gabriel Le Bomin	
2010	Tombé sur la tête		Didier Albert	TV movie
2010	Merci papa, merci maman	André	Vincent Giovanni	TV movie
2011	La Chance de ma vie	François	Nicolas Cuche	
2011	Je m'appelle Bernadette	Inspector Jacomet	Jean Sagols	
2011	Ni vu, ni connu	Rémi Chambord	Christophe Douchand	TV movie
2011	Bienvenue à Bouchon	Butin	Luc Béraud	TV movie
2011	Chez Maupassant	Chicot	Jacques Santamaria	TV series (1 episode)
2012	Thérèse Desqueyroux	Monsieur Larroque	Claude Miller	
2012	Parle tout bas, si c'est d'amour	The director	Sylvain Monod	TV movie
2012	Le juge est une femme	Pierre Bertrand	René Manzor	TV series (1 episode)
2012	Week-end chez les Toquées	Bertrand	Emmanuel Jeaugey	TV series (1 episode)
2013	Surveillance	Richard Texier	Sébastien Grall	TV movie
2013	Chambre noire	Capitaine Mathieu	Arnaud Malherbe	TV movie
2013	Scènes de ménages	The depressed friend	Francis Duquet	TV series (1 episode)
2013–2021	Mongeville	Antoine Mongeville	Bruno Garcia, Jacques Santamaria, ...	TV series (25 episodes)
2014	Les Francis	Jeff's grandpa	Fabrice Begotti	
2014	Nicholas on Holiday	The director	Laurent Tirard	
2014	Caïn	Barthes	Benoît d'Aubert	TV series (1 episode)
2014–2015	Mes chers disparus!	Rebec	Stéphane Kappes	TV series (6 episodes)
2015	Mon Souvenir	Himself	Tony Amoni	Short
2015	Nos chers voisins	Franck Berthier	Gaëtan Bevernaege	TV series (3 episodes)
2016	Magellan et Mongeville	Antoine Mongeville	Étienne Dhaene	TV movie
2018	Mongeville et Magellan: Un Amour de Jeunesse	Antoine Mongeville	Emmanuel Rigaut	TV movie
2018	Nina	Gérard	Éric Le Roux	TV series (1 episode)
2019	L'ange	The Angel	Frédéric Maury	Short
2020	Josephine, Guardian Angel	Rémy Bouvet	Philippe Proteau	TV series (1 episode)
2021	Tomorrow Is Ours	Régis Daunier	Julien Israël, Martin Day, ...	TV series (3 episodes)

=== Filmmaker ===
Year	Title	Notes
1982	Tête à claques	
1984	Le joli coeur	
1985	Ça n'arrive qu'à moi	
1986	Le débutant	
2003	Terminus	Short
2003	À un cheveu près	Short
2003	L'amour est aveugle	Short
