= Brigitte Auber =

French actress (born 1925)

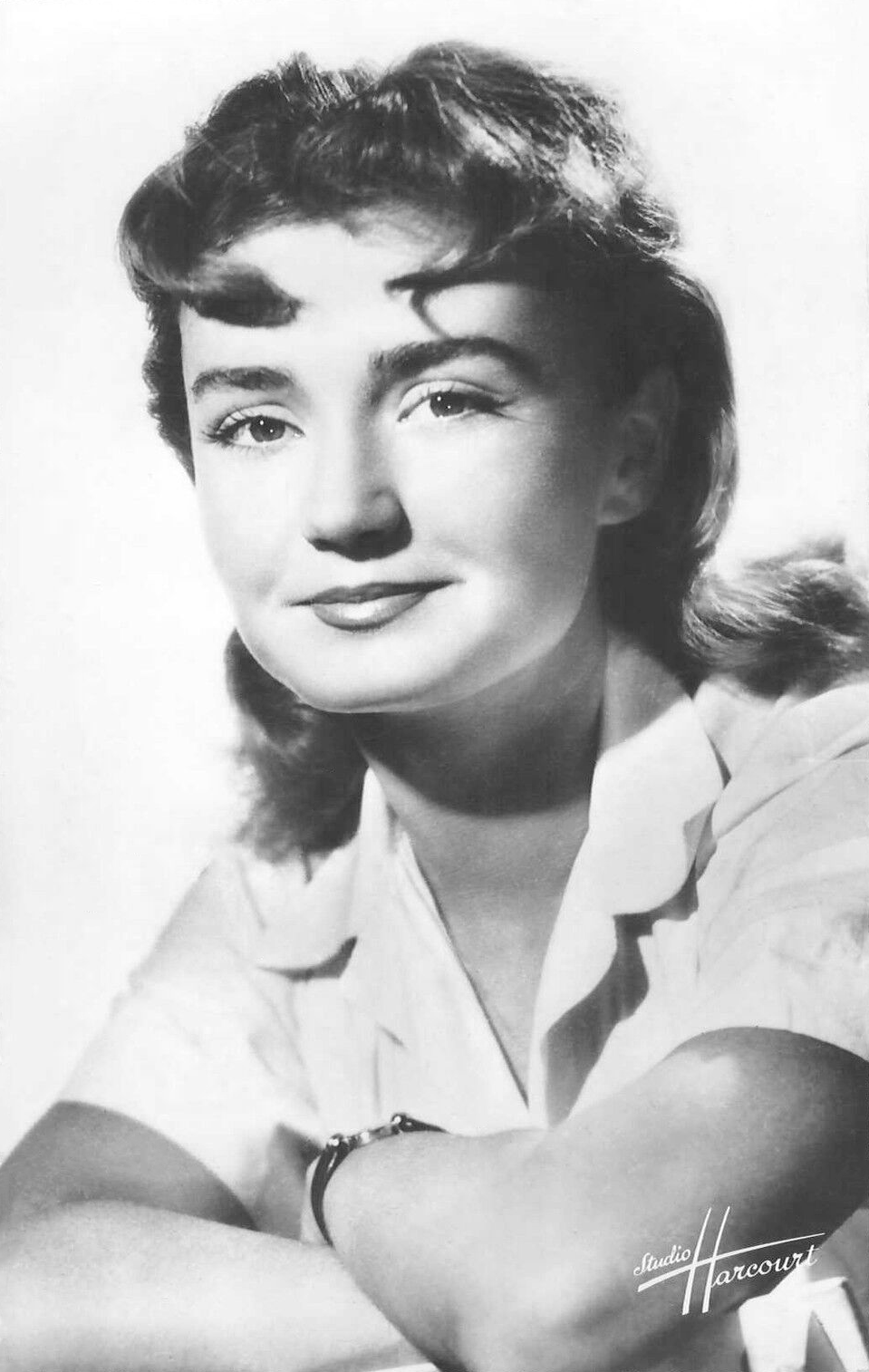
- Auber in 1954.
- Born: Marie-Claire Cahen de Labzac; 27 April 1925 (age 101); Paris, France
- Occupation: Actress
- Years active: 1945–1998 • 2022–present

Brigitte Auber (French pronunciation: [bʁiʒit obɛʁ]; born Marie-Claire Cahen de Labzac [maʁi klɛʁ kaʔɛn də labzak], 27 April 1925) is a French actress who has worked on stage, film and television in Europe.

== Career ==
Marie-Claire Cahen de Labzac was born in Paris on 27 April 1925. She began her film career with the leading role in Jacques Becker's Rendezvous in July (1949), and was known for roles in French films of the 1950s, including Julien Duvivier's romance Under the Sky of Paris (1951). Auber played the role of Danielle Foussard opposite Cary Grant and Grace Kelly in Alfred Hitchcock's To Catch a Thief, released in 1955.

For a few months in 1957 she was in a relationship with Alain Delon; they lived together in Paris. On the occasion of the 1957 Cannes Film Festival, she went with him to the French Riviera. In Cannes, Delon became friends with Jean-Claude Brialy and came into contact with the film industry, meeting his future agent George Beaume there, and was spotted by Henry Willson responsible for recruiting new talents on behalf of David O. Selznick.

Nearly a decade and a half later, Auber played the part of the elder Françoise in Claude de Givrays miniseries Mauregard (1969). The young Françoise was played by another French Hitchcock actress, Claude Jade from Topaz. She also had a supporting role in The Man in the Iron Mask, the 1998 film adaptation of the novel The Vicomte of Bragelonne: Ten Years Later by Alexandre Dumas. Leonardo DiCaprio played Louis XIV and his twin, the Man in the Iron Mask, while Auber played the Queen mother's attendant.

== Selected filmography ==
Year	Title	Role	Director	Notes
1946	Antoine and Antoinette	a guest at the wedding	Jacques Becker	
1946	Gates of the Night		Marcel Carné	Uncredited
1948	Les amoureux sont seuls au monde	Christine	Henri Decoin	
1949	Rendezvous in July	Thérèse Richard	Jacques Becker	
1950	Vendetta in Camargue	Huguette	Jean Devaivre	
1951	Under the Sky of Paris	Denise Lambert	Julien Duvivier	
1951	Victor	Marianne	Claude Heymann	
1952	L'Amour toujours l'amour	Anita	Maurice de Canonge	
1953	Women of Paris	Gisèle	Jean Boyer	
1955	To Catch a Thief	Danielle Foussard	Alfred Hitchcock	
1955	Les Aristocrates	Daisy de Maubrun	Denys de La Patellière	
1956	Ce soir les jupons volent	Blanche	Dimitri Kirsanoff	
1956	Lorsque l'enfant paraît	Annie Fouquet	Michel Boisrond	
1959	Mon pote le gitan	Odette	François Gir	
1970	Le Cœur fou	Cécile Menessier	Jean-Gabriel Albicocco	
1970	Mauregard	Françoise de Mettray	Claude de Givray	
1982	Mon Curé Chez les Nudistes	Charlotte, Antoine's wife	Robert Thomas	
1997	Le Déménagement	Blanche & Rose Colomb	Olivier Doran	
1998	The Man in the Iron Mask	Anne of Austria's lady-in-waiting	Randall Wallace	
