= Marcelle Tassencourt =

French actress

- Born: 28 May 1914; Neuilly-sur-Seine
- Died: 18 December 2001 (aged 87); Clamart
- Occupations: Actress; Theatre director
- Spouse: Thierry Maulnier

Marcelle Tassencourt (French: [maʁsɛl tasɑ̃kuʁ]; 28 May 1914 – 18 December 2001) was a French actress and theatre director.

In 1960, she was appointed head of the Théâtre Montansier in Versailles. She was a drama teacher at the Versailles conservatory. Among her students were Catherine Frot, Pierre Pradinas, George Corraface, Fanny Cottençon, Muriel Mayette, Anne Benoît and Francis Perrin who, some years after he finished the national conservatory, became in turn director of the Théâtre Montansier. Thierry Maulnier was her husband.

== Theatre ==
=== Comedian ===
- 1937: Le Simoun by Henri-René Lenormand, directed by Camille Corney, Théâtre des Célestins
- 1946: Auprès de ma blonde by Marcel Achard, directed by Pierre Fresnay, Théâtre de la Michodière
- 1948: Le Voleur d'enfants by Jules Supervielle, directed by Raymond Rouleau, Théâtre de l'Œuvre
- 1949: Le Sourire de la Joconde by Aldous Huxley, directed by Raymond Rouleau, Théâtre de l'Œuvre
- 1949: Jeanne et ses juges by Thierry Maulnier, directed by Maurice Cazeneuve, parvise of Rouen Cathedral
- 1950: Le Cid by Corneille, directed by Jean Vilar, Festival d'Avignon
- 1950: Le Profanateur by Thierry Maulnier, directed by Jean Vilar, Festival d'Avignon
- 1952: Le Profanateur by Thierry Maulnier, directed by Tania Balachova, Théâtre Antoine
- 1952: Le Cocotier by Jean Guitton, directed by Paule Rolle, Théâtre du Gymnase
- 1953: La Maison de la nuit by Thierry Maulnier, directed by Marcelle Tassencourt and Michel Vitold, Théâtre Hébertot
- 1954: Man's Fate by André Malraux, directed by Marcelle Tassencourt, Théâtre Hébertot
- 1955: Le Prince d'Égypte by Christopher Fry, directed by Marcelle Tassencourt, Théâtre du Vieux-Colombier
- 1955: Lady Windermere's Fan by Oscar Wilde, directed by Marcelle Tassencourt, Théâtre Hébertot
- 1956: Lady Windermere's Fan by Oscar Wilde, directed by Marcelle Tassencourt, Théâtre Daunou
- 1957: Wako, l’abominable homme des neiges by Roger Duchemin, directed by Jean Le Poulain, Théâtre Hébertot
- 1958: Procès à Jésus by Diego Fabbri, directed by Marcelle Tassencourt, Théâtre Hébertot
- 1960: Le Sexe et le néant by Thierry Maulnier, directed by Marcelle Tassencourt, Théâtre de l'Athénée
- 1962: Édouard mon fils by Robert Morley and Noel Langley, directed by Maurice Guillaud, Théâtre Montansier
- 1964: Édouard mon fils by Robert Morley and Noel Langley, directed by Maurice Guillaud, Théâtre Montparnasse
- 1965: Knock ou le triomphe de la médecine by Jules Romains, directed by Marcelle Tassencourt, Théâtre Montansier, Théâtre Montparnasse
- 1965: Procès à Jésus by Diego Fabbri, Théâtre Montansier de Versailles
- 1966: Topaze by Marcel Pagnol, directed by Marcelle Tassencourt, Théâtre Hébertot
- 1967: Au théâtre ce soir: Topaze by Marcel Pagnol, directed by Marcelle Tassencourt, TV director Pierre Sabbagh, Théâtre Marigny

=== Theatre director ===
- 1952: Dialogues des carmélites by Georges Bernanos, Théâtre Hébertot
- 1953: La Maison de la nuit by Thierry Maulnier, directed by Tassancourt with Michel Vitold, Théâtre Hébertot
- 1954: Man's Fate by André Malraux, Théâtre Hébertot
- 1955: Le Prince d'Égypte by Christopher Fry, Théâtre du Vieux-Colombier
- 1956: Les Étendards du roi by Adolfo Costa du Rels, Théâtre du Vieux Colombier, Théâtre Hébertot
- 1956: La Belle Dame sans merci by Jean Le Marois after John Keats, Théâtre Hébertot
- 1955: Lady Windermere's Fan by Oscar Wilde, Théâtre Hébertot
- 1956: Lady Windermere's Fan by Oscar Wilde, Théâtre Daunou
- 1956: La Nuit romaine by Albert Vidalie, Théâtre Hébertot
- 1958: Procès à Jésus by Diego Fabbri, Théâtre Hébertot
- 1958: Éboulement au quai nord by Ugo Betti, Théâtre de Poche Montparnasse
- 1959: L'Homme de guerre by François Ponthier, Comédie de Paris
- 1959: Long Day's Journey into Night by Eugene O'Neill, Théâtre Hébertot
- 1959: Le Dessous des cartes by André Gillois, Théâtre Hébertot
- 1960: Le Sexe et le néant by Thierry Maulnier, Théâtre de l'Athénée
- 1960: Le Signe du feu by Diego Fabbri, Théâtre Hébertot
- 1961: Le Dialogue des carmélites by Georges Bernanos, Comédie-Française
- 1961: Le Christ recrucifié by Nikos Kazantzakis, Théâtre Montansier
- 1962: Le Christ recrucifié by Nikos Kazantaákis, Théâtre de l'Odéon
- 1963: Andromaque by Racine, Théâtre Montparnasse
- 1963: Othello by William Shakespeare, Théâtre de l'Odéon
- 1964: Britannicus by Racine, Théâtre Montparnasse
- 1965: Knock ou le triomphe de la médecine by Jules Romains, Théâtre Montparnasse
- 1965: Agnès Bernauer by Friedrich Hebbel, Théâtre de l'Odéon
- 1965: Procès à Jésus by Diego Fabbri, Théâtre Montansier
- 1966: Topaze by Marcel Pagnol, Théâtre Hébertot
- 1967: Monsieur et Madame Molière by Jacques Chabannes, Théâtre de Puteaux
- 1967: Lorenzaccio by Alfred de Musset, Théâtre Montansier
- 1967: Andromaque by Racine, Théâtre Montparnasse
- 1967: The Taming of the Shrew by William Shakespeare, Théâtre des Mathurins
- 1969: Le Menteur by Carlo Goldoni, Théâtre de la Renaissance
- 1970: The Merchant of Venice by William Shakespeare, Théâtre Édouard VII
- 1972: Fils de personne by Henri de Montherlant, Théâtre Montansier
- 1972: Médée, by Franz Grillparzer, Théâtre Montansier
- 1977: Phèdre by Racine, Grand Trianon Festival de Versailles
- 1978: Britannicus by Racine, Grand Trianon, Festival de Versailles
- 1978: L'Avocat du diable by Dore Schary, Théâtre Montansier
- 1979: Le Bourgeois gentilhomme by Molière, Théâtre Mogador
- 1979: Au théâtre ce soir : La Veuve rusée by Carlo Goldoni, TV director Pierre Sabbagh, Théâtre Marigny
- 1979: Athalie by Racine, Orangerie du château, Festival de Versailles
- 1980: Arlequin, serviteur de deux maîtres by Carlo Goldoni, Théâtre Montansier
- 1980: La Thébaïde by Racine, Orangerie du château, Festival de Versailles
- 1983: Andromaque by Racine, Festival de Versailles
- 1983: Madame... pas dame by Robert Favart, Théâtre Montansier
- 1984: Madame... pas dame by Robert Favart, Théâtre des Bouffes-Parisiens
- 1984: Le Cid by Corneille, Festival de Versailles
- 1986: Horace by Corneille, Festival de Versailles Grand Trianon
- 1987: Polyeucte by Corneille, Festival de Versailles, Grand Trianon
- 1988: Britannicus by Racine, Grand Trianon, Festival de Versailles
- 1988: Les Fourberies de Scapin by Molière, Grand Trianon in Versailles
- 1991: Jeanne et les juges by Thierry Maulnier, Théâtre Édouard VII
- 1992: La Maison de la nuit by Thierry Maulnier, Théâtre 14 Jean-Marie Serreau
- 1994: Britannicus by Racine, Théâtre de l'Ouest parisien
- 1995: The Just Assassins by Albert Camus, Théâtre de l'Ouest parisien

== Filmography ==
=== Cinema ===
- 1945: L'Ennemi secret, short film by J. K. Raymond-Millet
- 1965: Un mari à prix fixe by Claude de Givray
- 1989: À deux minutes près by Éric Le Hung

=== Television ===
- 1952: Le Profanateur, telefilm by René Lucot
- 1967: Au théâtre ce soir: Topaze by Marcel Pagnol, TV director Pierre Sabbagh
- 1975: La Passion d'Anna Karénine, telefilm by Yves-André Hubert
- 1978: Il était un musicien, série (season 1, episode 4 : Monsieur Saint-Saëns), TV director Claude Chabrol
- 1997: Maître Da Costa, serial (season 1, episode 1 : Les Témoins de l’oubli)
