= Théâtre Montansier (Versailles) =

Theater in Versailles, France

Coordinates: 48°48′29″N 2°7′27″E

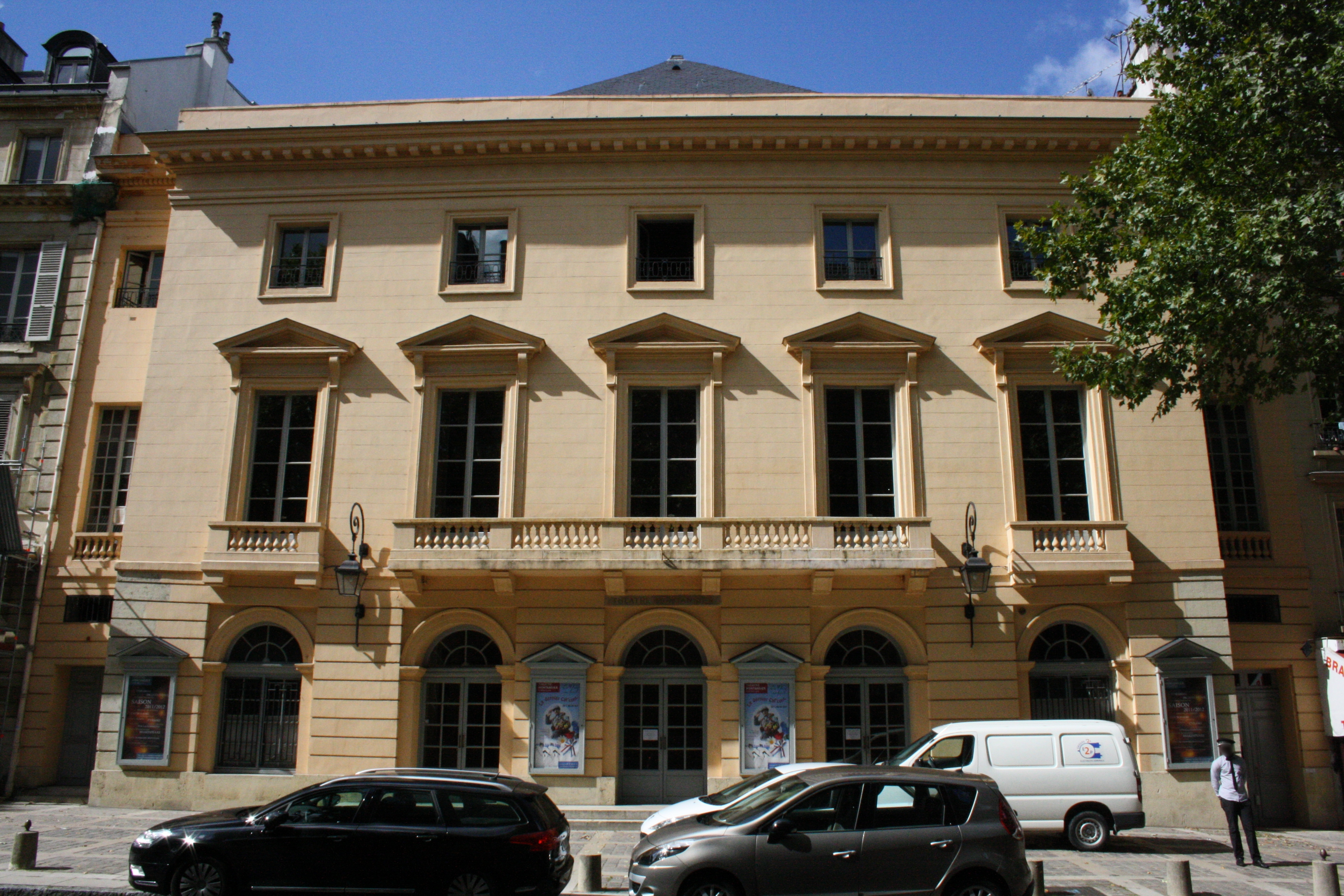
The Théâtre Montansier

The Théâtre Montansier, also known as the Théâtre de Versailles, is a French theatre in rue des Réservoirs, Versailles, near the royal château. It was created by the actress and theatre director Mademoiselle Montansier, designed by Jean-François Heurtier, inspecteur général des bâtiments du roi and designer of the first Salle Favart of the Opéra-Comique. The theatre opened 18 November 1777, with Louis XVI and Marie Antoinette in attendance.

It has been headed by such figures as Marcelle Tassencourt, wife of Thierry Maulnier, and Francis Perrin. Since 2000, it has been headed by Jean-Daniel Laval who, since taking on the role, has declared his wish to see the Théâtre Montansier opened up to a wider audience.

== Bibliography ==
- Fromageot, Paul (1905). Le Théâtre de Versailles et Le Montansier. Versailles: Aubert. Copy at Google Books.
- Villard, Jacques (1998). Le théâtre Montansier à Versailles - De la Montansier à Francis Perrin, Champflour, Marly-le-Roi. ISBN 2-87655-037-7
