= Salle Montansier =

Salle Montansier may refer to:

- Théâtre Montansier (Versailles)
- Théâtre National (rue de la Loi)
- Théâtre du Palais Royal
