= Mauregard (miniseries) =

- Genre: Drama
- Written by: Claude de Givray; Bernard Revon
- Directed by: Claude de Givray
- Starring: Richard Leduc; Claude Jade; Henri Guisol; Brigitte Auber; Michel Subor; Gaby Sylvia; Roger Pigaut
- Theme music composer: Georges Delerue
- Composer: Georges Delerue
- Country of origin: France
- Original language: French
- No. of episodes: 6

Production
- Cinematography: Pierre Mareschal
- Production company: ORTF

Original release
- Release: 1 October – 5 November 1970

Mauregard is a French miniseries by Claude de Givray (1970) with Richard Leduc, Claude Jade, Henri Guisol, Brigitte Auber and Michel Subor.

The family epic extends over 120 years from 1849 to 1969: Four generations in Mauregard Castle.

It all starts with the return of the presumed dead nobleman Hippolyte de Mettray (Jacques Berthier) to his wife Anne-Marie (Gaby Sylvia). Who is engaged to the Country Doctor Martin (John Rico). But the repentant adventurer Hippolyte wins Anne-Marie back. At the same time he bought the castle of his ancestors, Mauregard, back.

Twenty years later, Hippolyte wants his son Maxence (Richard Leduc) with Hélène (Annick Korrigan), the rich daughter of the adjacent Marquis, marry. But Maxence, in love with the orphan Françoise (Claude Jade), refuses the money marriage which is mainly obtained Mauregard. Françoise and Maxence are supported in their fight calculated by Hélène.

Another twenty years later - Hippolyte died without leaving a will - can Maxence (now: Henri Guisol) and Françoise (now: Brigitte Auber) hardly get the lock.

Another generation later versa Maxences nephew Charles-Auguste (Michel Subor) from the First World War back. Two women - Agnès (Anne Vernon) and Elise (Marie-Blanche Vergnes) - scramble for him.

Clément (Marc di Napoli), son of Charles-Auguste and Elise, fighting in World War II for the Resistance against the Germans.

In the last part Clément (now: Jacques Destoop) returns with the young Carol (Jacky Gee) from Canada back to the castle Mauregard.

== Background ==
Claude de Givray and Bernard Revon, the authors of the saga, also were François Truffaut's co-authors in Stolen Kisses (1968) and Bed and Board (1970). The leading lady of both films, Claude Jade, played at that time for six months in the US in Alfred Hitchcock's Topaz. In rotating free time she took the role of orphan Françoise at their familiar "film family". Her Topaz -husband Michel Subor also returned in the meantime returned to France and played the part Charles-Auguste. The film was shot in the Touraine.

== Cast ==
- Henri Guisol : Maxence elder
- Richard Leduc : Maxence young
- Claude Jade : Françoise young
- Brigitte Auber : Françoise elder
- Jacques Berthier : Hippolyte de Mettray
- Gaby Sylvia: Anne-Marie de Mettray
- Roger Pigaut : Richard
- Christine Simon : Léontine young
- Jandeline: Léontine elder
- John Rico : Martin
- Jacques Couturier : Lefosset
- Françoise Morhange : Mme Eugène
- Anne-Marie Coffinet : Aline
- Anne Korrigan : Hélène
- Michel Subor : Charles-Auguste
- Marie-Blanche Vergne: Élise
- Anne Vernon : Agnès
- Marc di Napoli : Clément, Charles-Auguste's son
- Jacques Destoop: Clément elder
- Jackie Gee: Carol
- Louis Jojot : Father Louis
- René Lafleur : Badin
- Jacques Galland : The Mayor
- Deniz Direz: Charles-Auguste child
- Béatrice Romand : Sophie child
- Michèle Montel: Sophie adult
- Caroline Reverdiau: Caroline
- Philippe Girard : Philippe
