= Jean-François Heurtier =

French architect

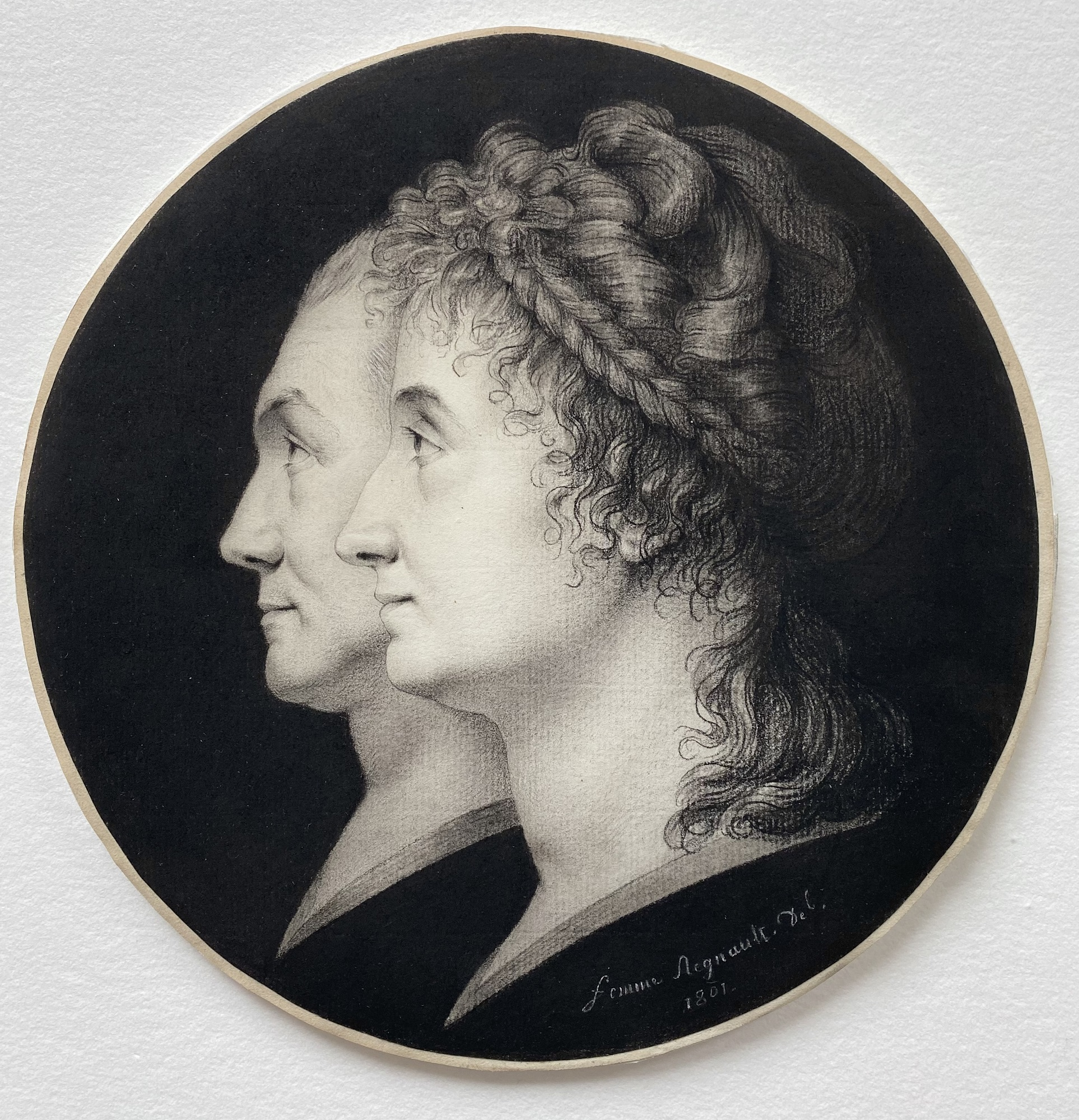
Portrait of Jean-François and Marie-Victoire Heurtier, by Sophie Regnault (1801)

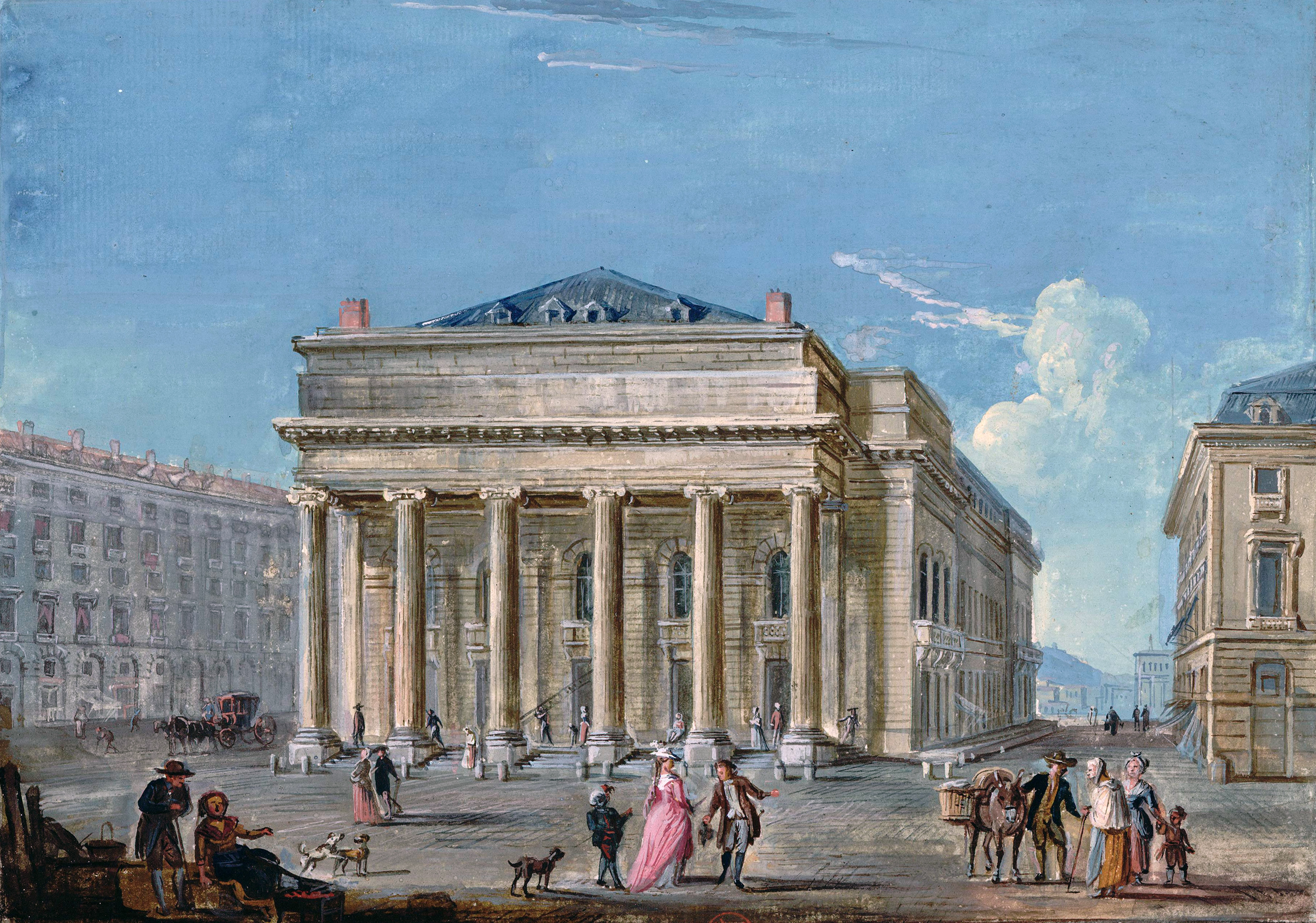
The original Salle Favart (drawing by Jean-Baptiste Lallemand)

Jean-François Heurtier (French pronunciation: [ʒɑ̃ fʁɑ̃swa œʁtje]; 6 March 1739, Paris - 16 April 1822, Versailles) was a French architect.

== Biography ==
He studied at the Académie Royale de Peinture et de Sculpture, and was awarded the Prix de Rome in 1765. He was received as a member of the Académie royale d'architecture in 1776, and remained with that organization until its dissolution in 1793.

Under the reign of Louis XVI, he served as second-in-command to the King's Architect, Louis-Denis Le Camus. Later, he was Inspector General of the King's Buildings, and an official architect for the City of Paris.

In 1801, he was elected a member of the Institut de France and the Académie des Beaux-Arts, where he took Seat #4 for architecture, succeeding Jacques Denis Antoine (deceased). Three years later, he was appointed Commissaire Voyer (a superintendent of roads). He served two terms as President of the Institut in 1806. This was followed by appointments to the Council of Civil Buildings (1807), and as Inspector General of the Great Roads (1809).

His principal works include the Théâtre Montansier in Versailles (1777), and the original "Salle Favart"; home of the Comédie-Italienne, now known as the Opéra-Comique (1783). It was destroyed by a fire in 1838. In the 1780s, he also designed a pavilion for the Château de Meudon; loosely based on preliminary designs by King Louis.

== Sources ==
- Louis David de Pénanrun, François Roux and Edmond Augustin Delaire, Les architectes élèves de l'école des beaux-arts (1793-1907), Librairie de la construction moderne, 2nd ed., 1907, pg.293
- Michel Gallet, Les architectes parisiens du XVIIIe siècle, Mengès, 1995 ISBN 978-2-85620-370-5
- Charles de Franqueville, Le premier siècle de l'Institut de France, Rothschild, 1895
