= Robert Benayoun =

French film critic and director

- Born: 12 December 1926; Port-Lyautey, Morocco
- Died: October 20, 1996 (aged 69); Paris, France
- Occupations: Film critic; author; film director

Robert Benayoun (12 December 1926 – 20 October 1996) was a French film critic, author, and film director. A member of the surrealist movement from 1948, he was a key figure at Positif for over three decades, where he waged a sustained polemic against Cahiers du cinéma and the French New Wave. He would later direct two feature films.

== Biography ==
=== Early life and surrealism ===
Benayoun was born on 12 December 1926 in Port-Lyautey (now Kénitra), Morocco. After abandoning his initial studies in law, he relocated to Paris, where he regularly frequented Henri Langlois's Cinémathèque Française. In the late 1940s, he integrated into the inner circle of André Breton and formally aligned himself with the surrealist movement.

He remained an active participant in the group's activities for nearly two decades, contributing essays, poetry, and plastic collages to its successive official journals, including Médium, Le Surréalisme, même, La Brèche, and L'Archibras. Highly engaged in political anti-colonialism, Benayoun was a signatory of the Manifesto of the 121 in September 1960, an open letter defending the right to insubordination during the Algerian War.

=== Film criticism ===
In March 1951, Benayoun co-founded the avant-garde surrealist film journal L'Âge du cinéma, serving as its editor-in-chief alongside Ado Kyrou, Gérard Legrand, and Georges Goldfayn. Following the magazine's closure in 1952, its core editorial group transitioned to Positif, whose editorial board Benayoun officially joined in 1954. Over a tenure exceeding three decades, he became one of the magazine's defining voices, while concurrently writing for Demain, France Observateur, and Le Point, and appearing as a regular panelist on the radio program Le Masque et la Plume.

Benayoun was a primary ideological combatant in the fierce conflict between Positif and Cahiers du cinéma. Through polemical essays like "Le roi est nu" ("The King is Naked") in June 1962, he sought to demystify the French New Wave, denouncing its directors as "cinematic cannibals" and attacking their formalist, "ultra-bourgeois expression" for lacking genuine socio-political commitment.

His critical writing focused on the surrealist and subversive potential of popular culture, comedy, and animation. He authored influential monographs advocating for American slapstick and animation, notably championing Tex Avery in Le Dessin animé après Walt Disney (1961), which won the Prix Armand-Tallier, and analyzing eroticism in Érotique du surréalisme (1965). Benayoun was also the foremost French defender and a close personal friend of Jerry Lewis, framing him as a profound modernist filmmaker in his 1972 book Bonjour Monsieur Lewis. His other major monographs covered Buster Keaton, the Marx Brothers, Woody Allen, Alain Resnais, and early analyses of Roy Lichtenstein's pop art. Before his death, he was working on a book about Steven Spielberg with the director's cooperation, which remains incomplete and unpublished.

=== Filmmaking and death ===
Benayoun transitioned into film directing with his debut feature, Paris n'existe pas (1969), a surrealist fantasy starring Richard Leduc, Danièle Gaubert, and Serge Gainsbourg. The narrative follows a young painter who, after ingesting an experimental substance, develops psychological anomalies that allow him to perceive past and future temporalities through vivid, hallucinatory visions. The film's musical score was composed by Serge Gainsbourg and Jean-Claude Vannier, marking the historical first collaboration between the duo prior to their work on Histoire de Melody Nelson. The picture was selected for the Semaine de la Critique at the 1969 Cannes Film Festival, and was subsequently showcased at the Locarno Film Festival and the San Francisco International Film Festival.

In 1975, Benayoun directed his second and final narrative feature, Sérieux comme le plaisir (Serious as Pleasure), which he co-wrote alongside the acclaimed screenwriter Jean-Claude Carrière. A surrealist road movie tracing the journey of a bohemian, non-conformist trio, the film featured an ensemble cast including Jane Birkin, Richard Leduc, Michael Lonsdale, Isabelle Huppert, and Pierre Étaix, set to an original score composed by Michel Berger. He also returned to filmmaking in a documentary capacity with Bonjour, Mr. Lewis (1982), a feature-length cinematic extension of his prior written monograph, compiling decades of personal interview footage with Jerry Lewis.

Benayoun died in Paris on 20 October 1996, aged 69. He is buried in the Montparnasse Cemetery.

== Publications ==
- Anthologie du non-sens (Jean-Jacques Pauvert, 1957)
- Le Dessin animé après Walt Disney (Jean-Jacques Pauvert, 1961)
- Érotique du surréalisme (Jean-Jacques Pauvert, 1965)
- John Huston (Seghers, 1966)
- Bonjour Monsieur Lewis (Le Terrain Vague / Éric Losfeld, 1972)
- Le Nonsense (Balland, 1977)
- Les Frères Marx (Seghers, 1980)
- Alain Resnais, arpenteur de l'imaginaire (Stock, 1980)
- Le Regard de Buster Keaton (Herscher, 1982)
- Les Dingues du nonsense de Lewis Carroll à Woody Allen (Seuil, 1986)
- Le Mystère Tex Avery (Seuil, 1988)
- Le Rire des surréalistes (La Bougie du Sapeur, 1988)

== Filmography ==
Year	Title
1969	Paris n'existe pas
1975	Sérieux comme le plaisir
1982	Bonjour Monsieur Lewis
