= Serious as Pleasure =

1975 film

- Directed by: Robert Benayoun
- Written by: Robert Benayoun; Jean-Claude Carrière
- Produced by: Pierre Neurrisse; Sergio Gobbi
- Starring: Jane Birkin
- Cinematography: Jean Badal
- Edited by: Jean Ravel
- Music by: Michel Berger
- Distributed by: Lugo Films
- Release date: 15 January 1975
- Running time: 96 minutes
- Country: France
- Language: French
- Box office: $1.6 million

Serious as Pleasure (French: Sérieux comme le plaisir) is a 1975 French drama film directed by Robert Benayoun.

== Cast ==
- Jane Birkin - Ariane Berg
- Richard Leduc - Bruno
- Raymond Bussières - The fisherman
- Georges Mansart - Patrice
- Paul Demange - The cards specialist
- Hubert Deschamps - The man at the restaurant
- Marc Dudicourt - The mercier
- Isabelle Huppert - The girl brought back at home
- Francis Perrin - The car seller
- Roger Riffard - Man in the field
- Jacques Spiesser - The man at the 103 kilometer
- Jacques Villeret - The cop on television
- Jean-Luc Bideau - Man on the Road
- Roland Dubillard - M. Berg, Ariane's father
- Pierre Étaix - The boy upstairs
- Andréa Ferréol - The lady in white
- Serge Gainsbourg - The unknown of the lake
- Michael Lonsdale - Inspector Fournier

== See also ==
- Isabelle Huppert on screen and stage
