= Salle Favart =

Opera house in Paris, France

- Théâtre de l'Opéra-Comique
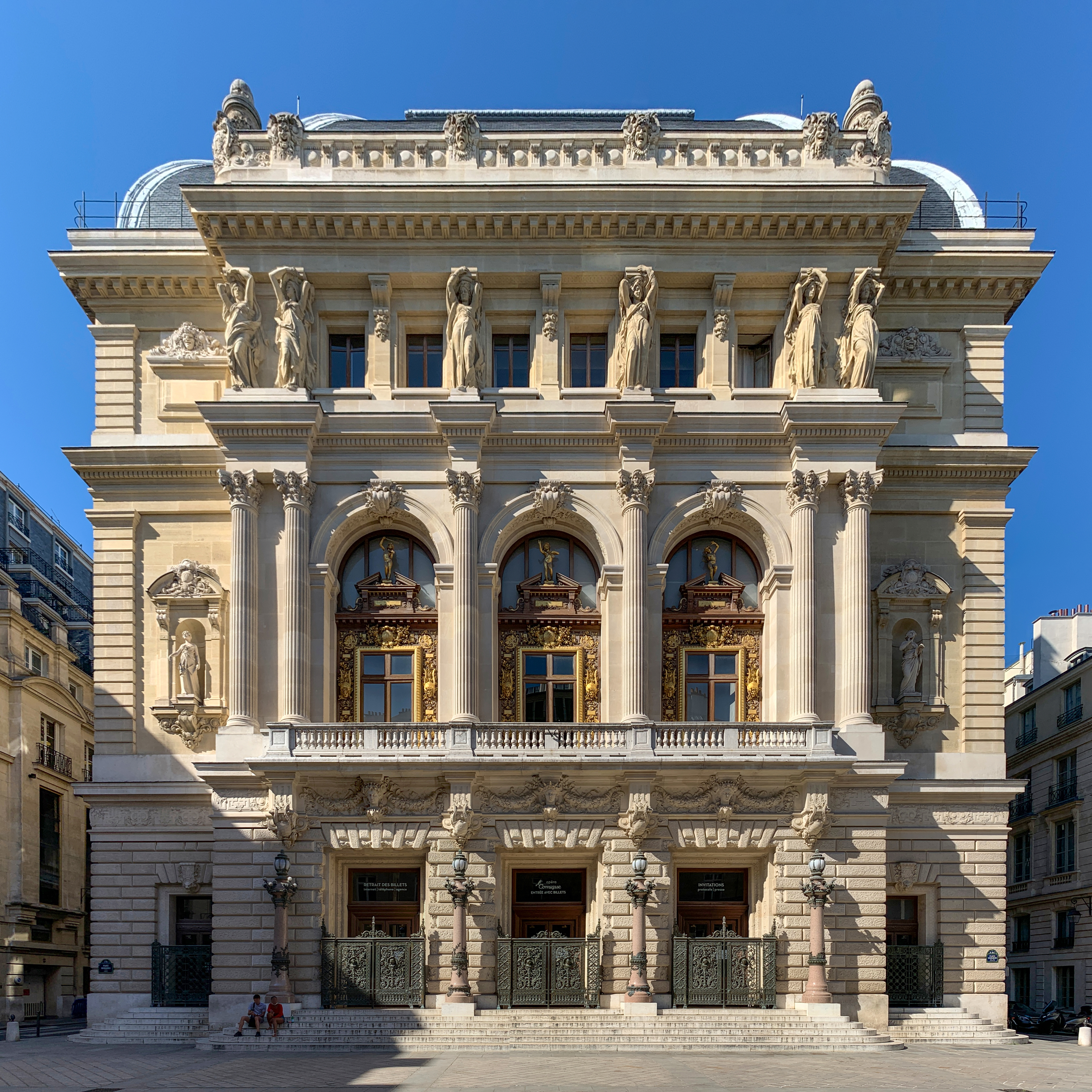
- Principal facade of the Salle Favart
- Interactive map of Salle Favart
- Address: Place Boïeldieu, 2nd arrondissement Paris
- Coordinates: 48.8709°N 2.3378°E
- Capacity: 1200 seats
- Type: Opera house
- Public transit: Richelieu – Drouot

Construction
- Opened: 1898
- Architect: Louis Bernier

Tenant
- Opéra-Comique

Website
- www.opera-comique.com

The Salle Favart (French pronunciation: [sal favaʁ]), officially the Théâtre de l'Opéra-Comique ([teɑtʁ də lɔpeʁa kɔmik]), is a Paris opera house and theatre, the current home of the Opéra-Comique. It was built from 1893 to 1898 in a neo-Baroque style to the designs of the French architect Louis Bernier and is located on the Place Boïeldieu just south of the Boulevard des Italiens.

== Background ==
The Salle Favart is the third theatre with this name on this site. The first Salle Favart, built to the designs of Jean-François Heurtier, opened on 28 April 1783. Charles Simon Favart was the company's director at the time. It was destroyed by fire on the night of 14 or 15 January 1838. The second Salle Favart, built to the designs of Théodore Charpentier, opened on 16 May 1840. It was destroyed by fire on 25 May 1887.

== Competition ==
After long deliberation following the second fire, a decision was finally reached to rebuild on the same constricted site. A competition was held, judged by five winners of the Grand Prix de Rome (including Charles Garnier, the architect of the Opéra), which ensured the design would reflect academic and official tastes. Because of disputes within the profession, more avant-garde architects did not participate. The winner of the competition was Louis Bernier (a former student of Honoré Daumet at the École des Beaux-Arts), who had won the Prix de Rome in 1872.

== Construction and design ==
The new Salle Favart, built from 1893 to 1898, is typical of Beaux-Arts architecture. The neo-Baroque facade is an adaptation of Garnier's design for the Opéra, and the elaborate exterior and interior decoration shows the influence of both Garnier and Daumet. The auditorium has a horseshoe shape with four galleries, a traditional design with roots reaching as far back as the 17th century. The structure has iron framework for reasons of fire resistance (the use of iron in theatre construction began in the 1780s), but unlike more forward-looking architects, Bernier concealed the frame with heavy stone.

In keeping with the neo-Baroque design, nearly photo-realistic allegorical paintings were commissioned to decorate the theatre's foyers, and in spite of budgetary constraints, the decorators "managed to produce an interior of overbearing opulence, especially in the lavishly histrionic, gilt-dripping stuccowork of the auditorium." The critical reception was quite varied, with the rationalists attacking the "delirious frivolity" of the design, and the traditionalists defending it as appropriate for the operettas to be performed inside.

== Photographs of the interior ==
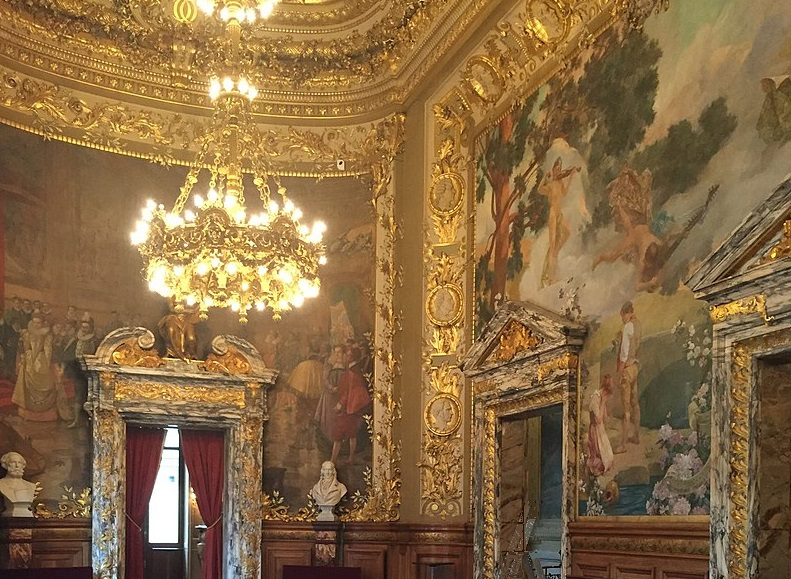
Grand Foyer

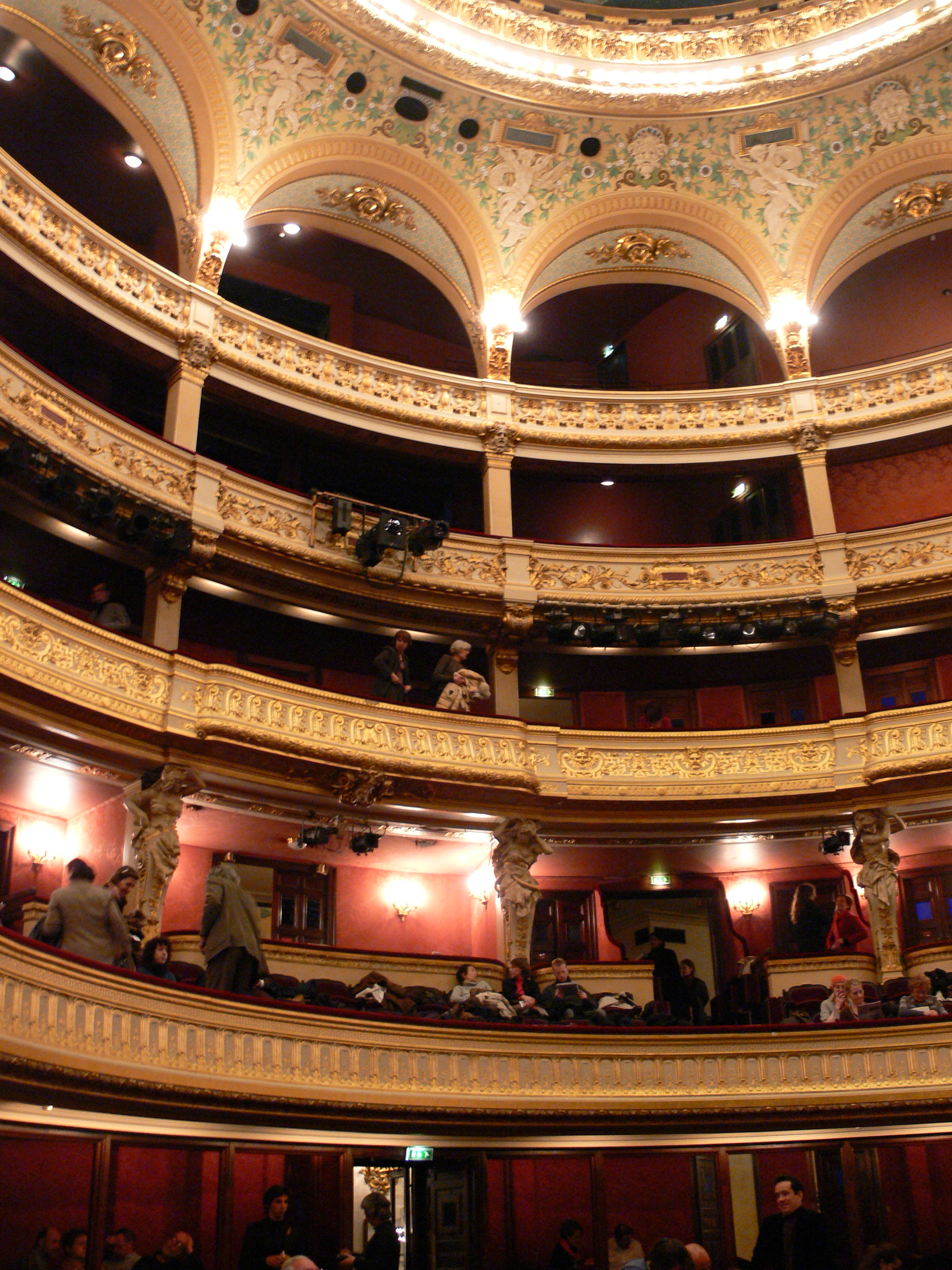
Galleries

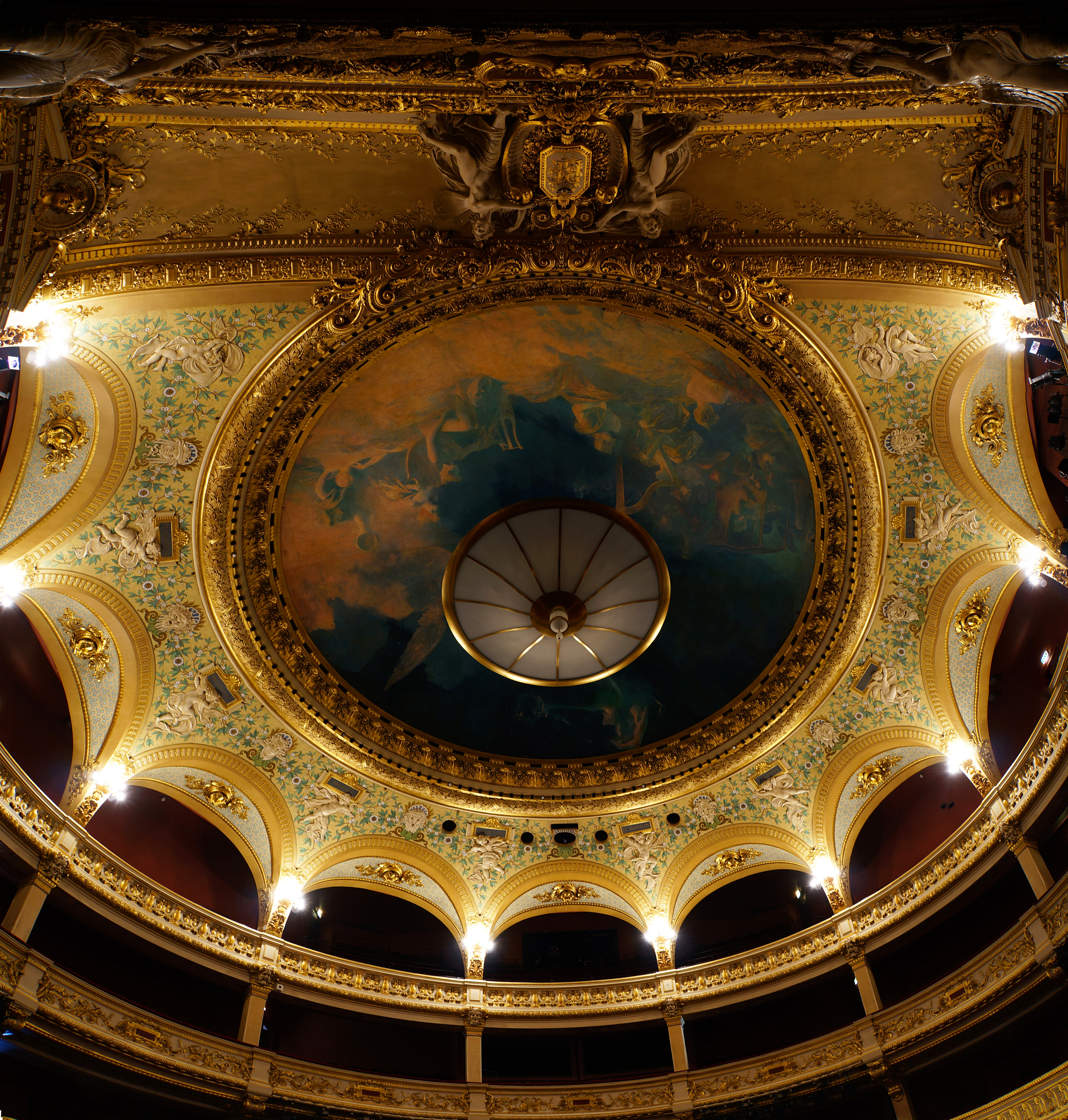
Auditorium ceiling

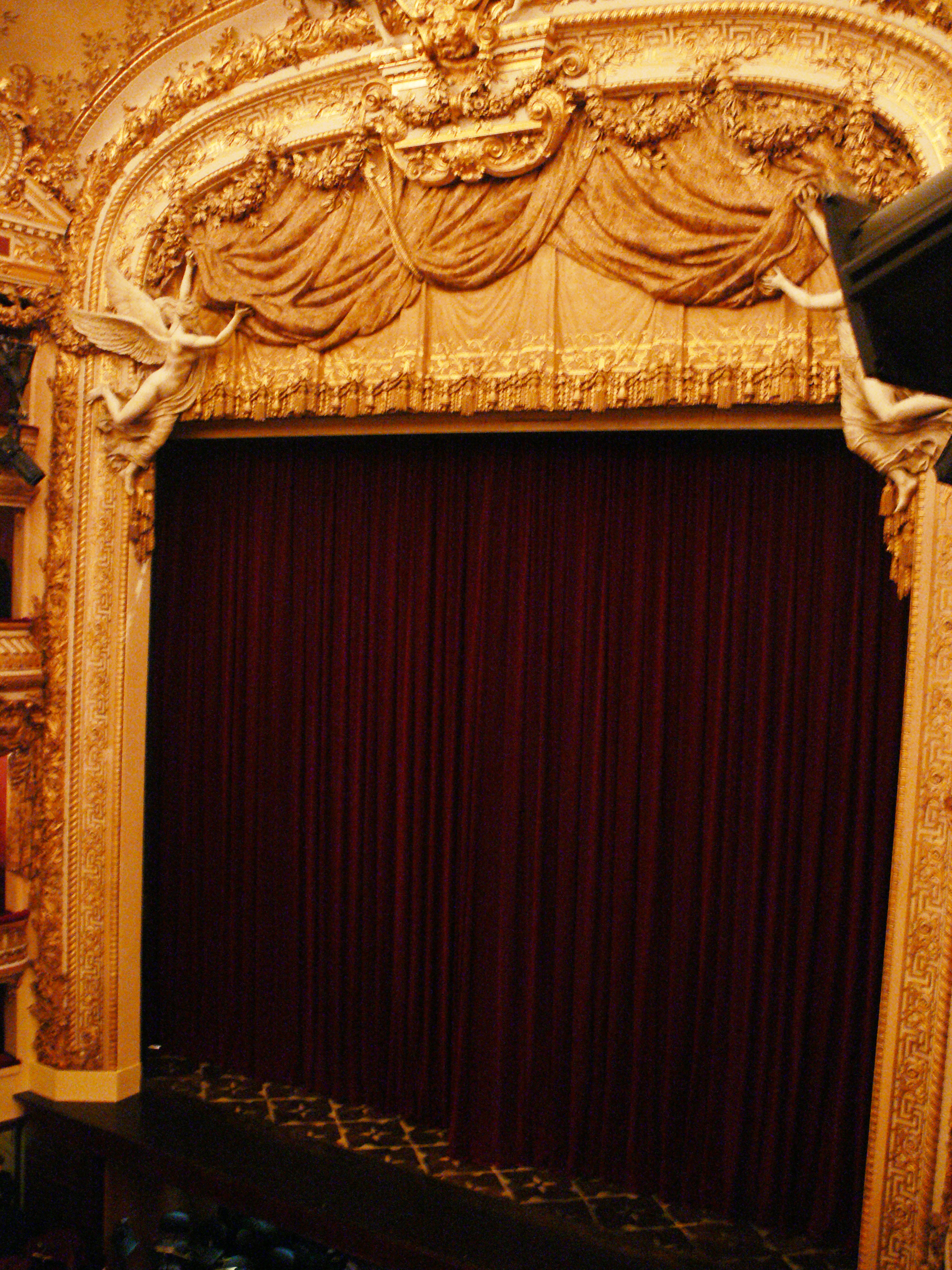
Proscenium and curtain

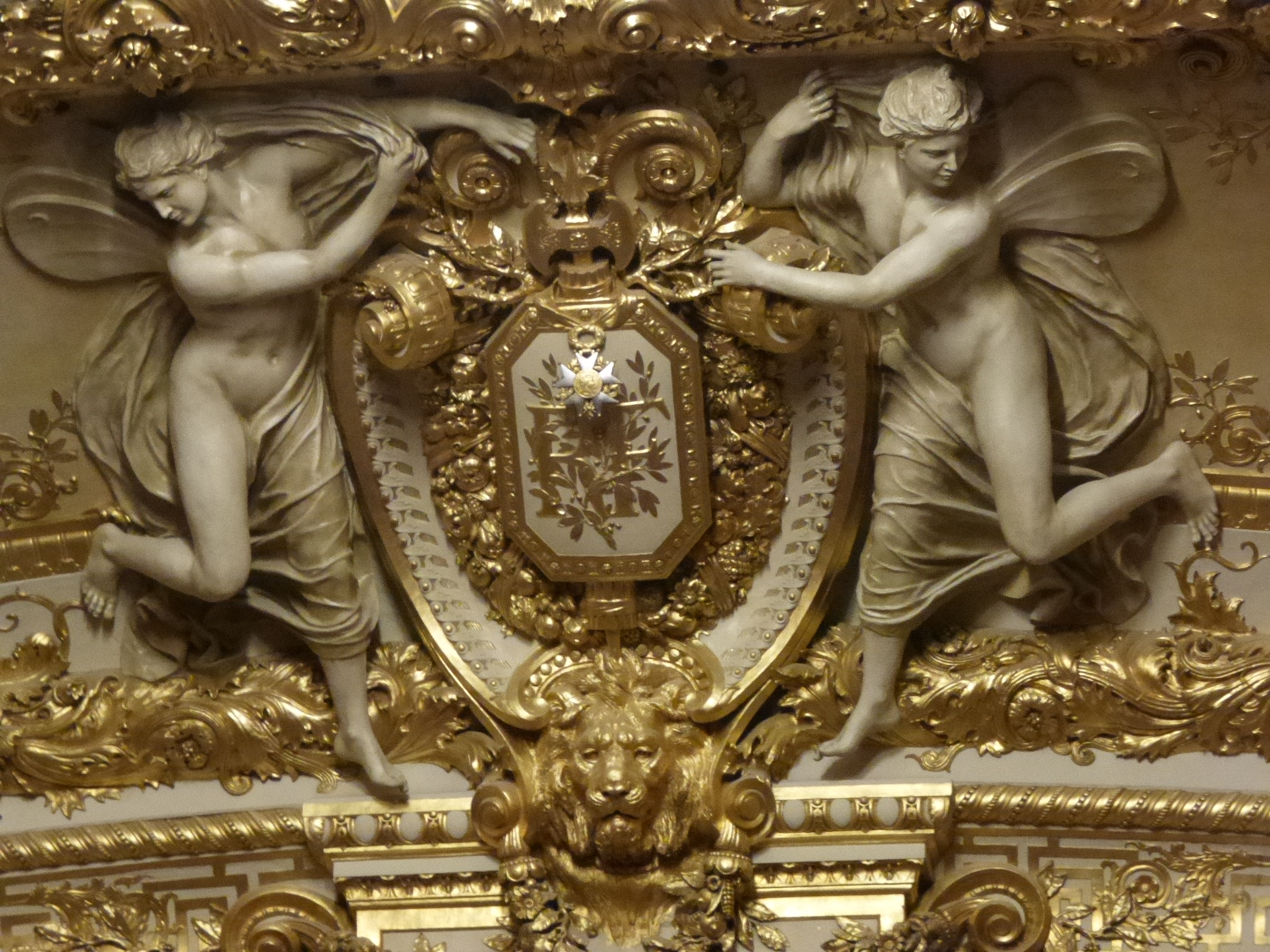
Decorative stuccowork

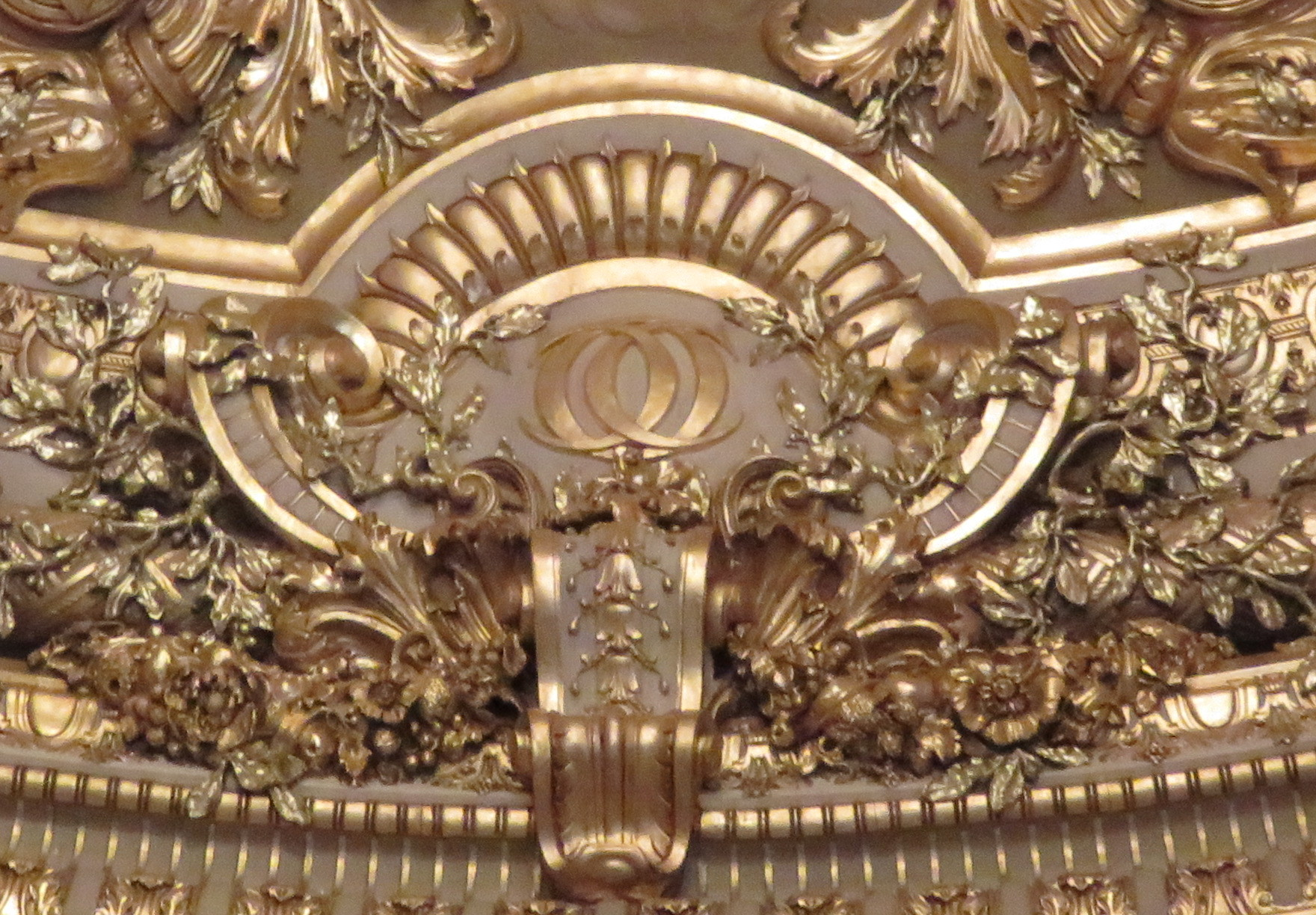
Opéra-Comique monogram

== Architectural drawings by Bernier ==
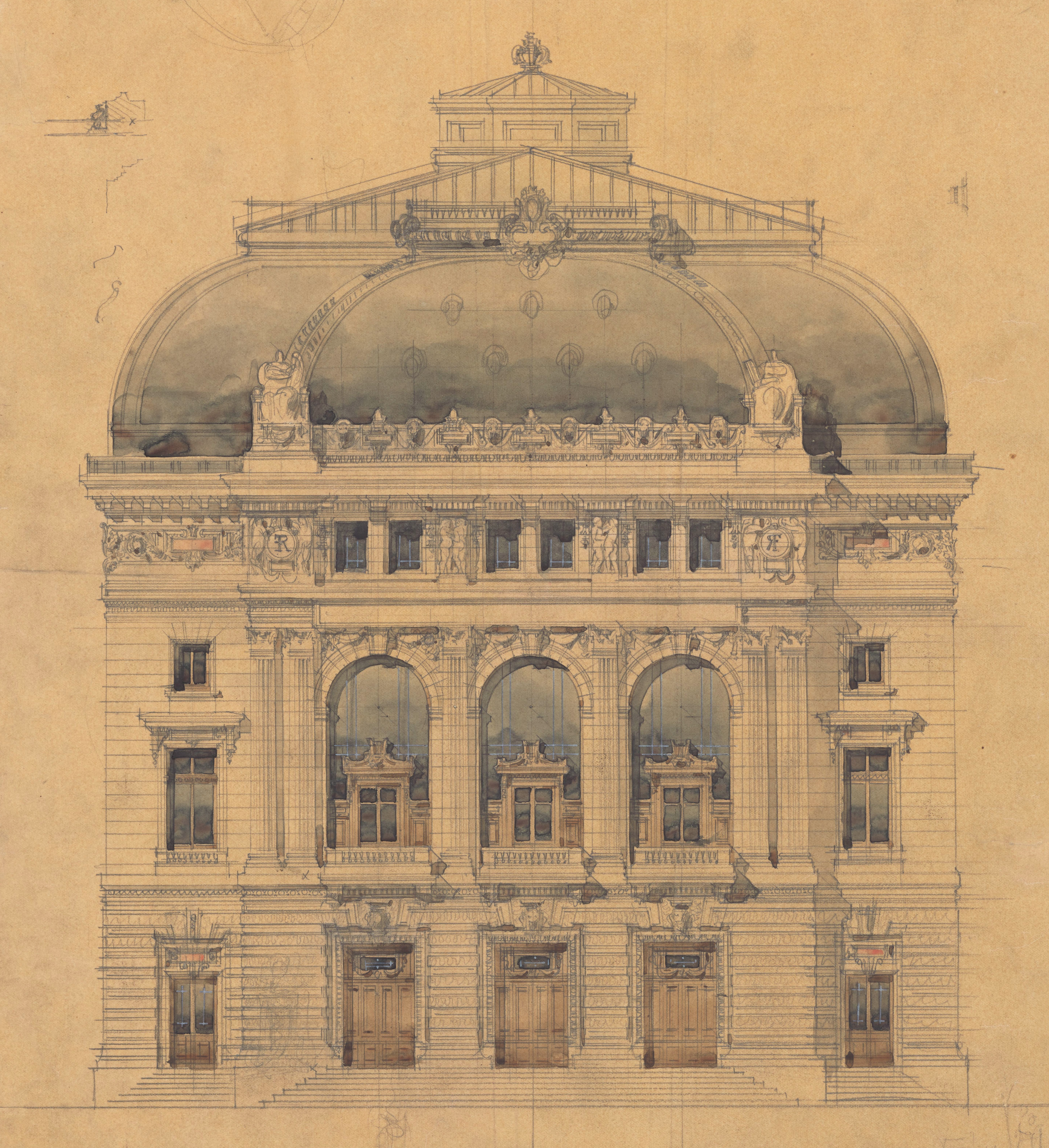
Principal facade

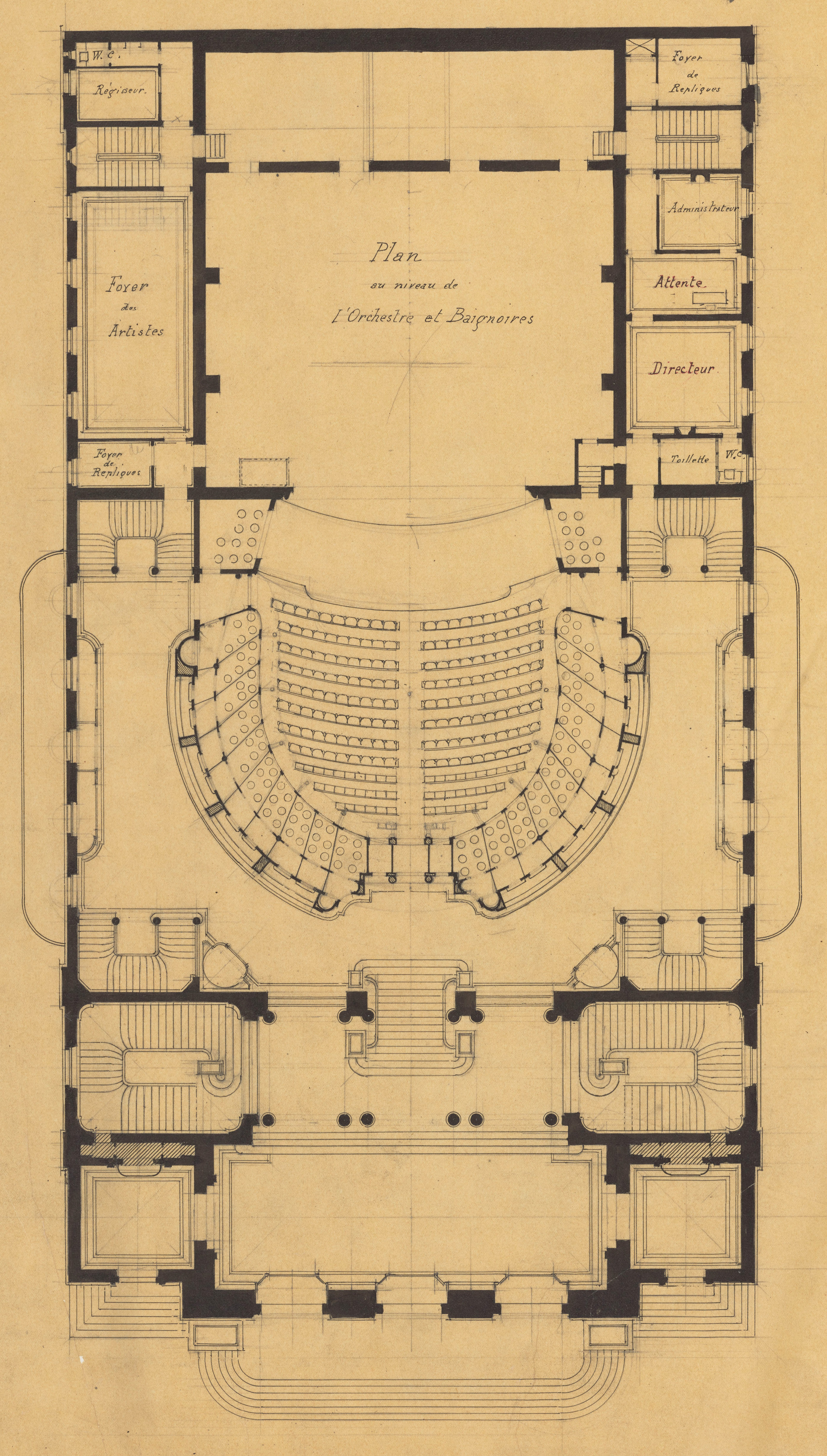
Plan at orchestra level

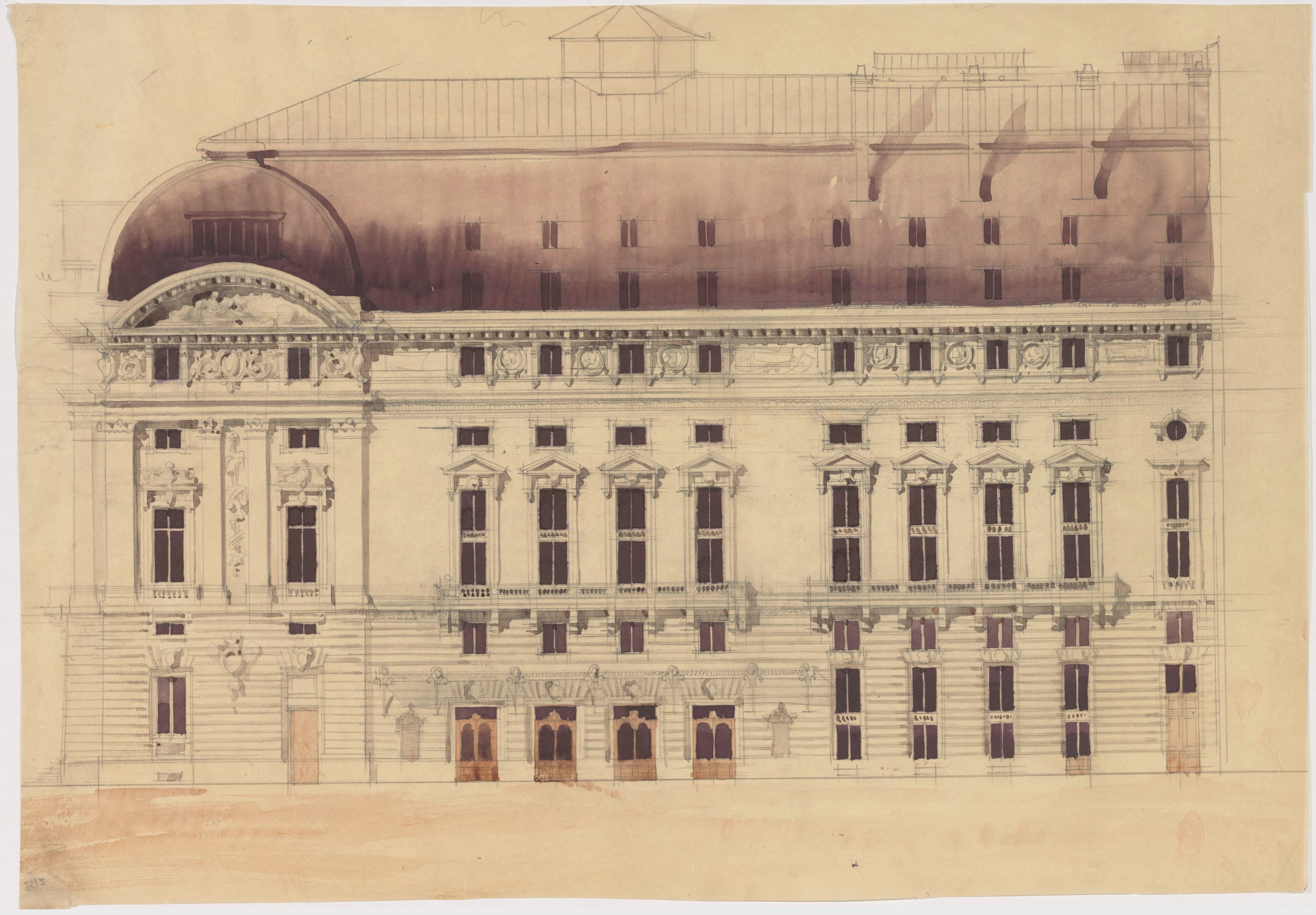
Lateral facade

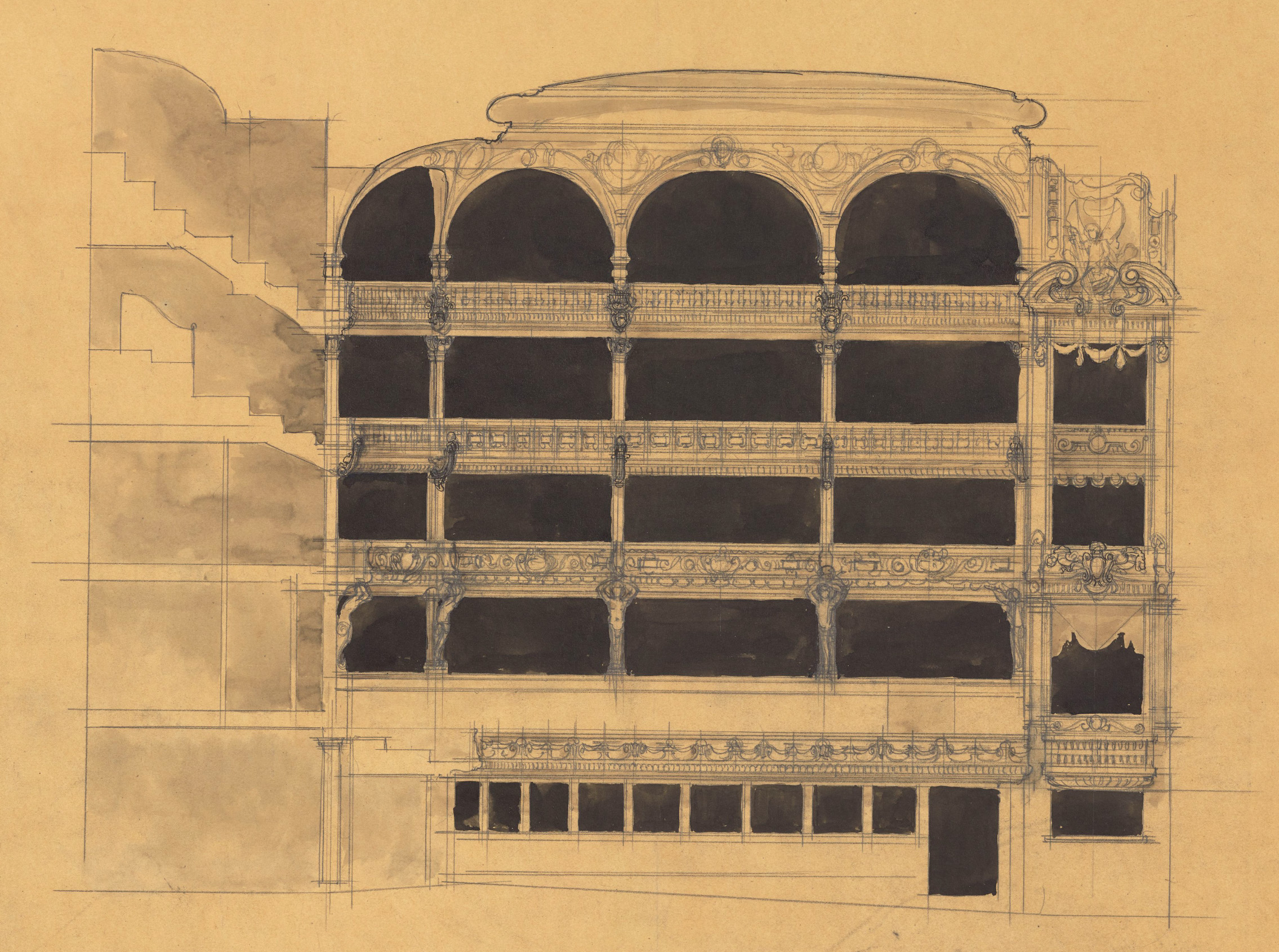
Long section of the auditorium

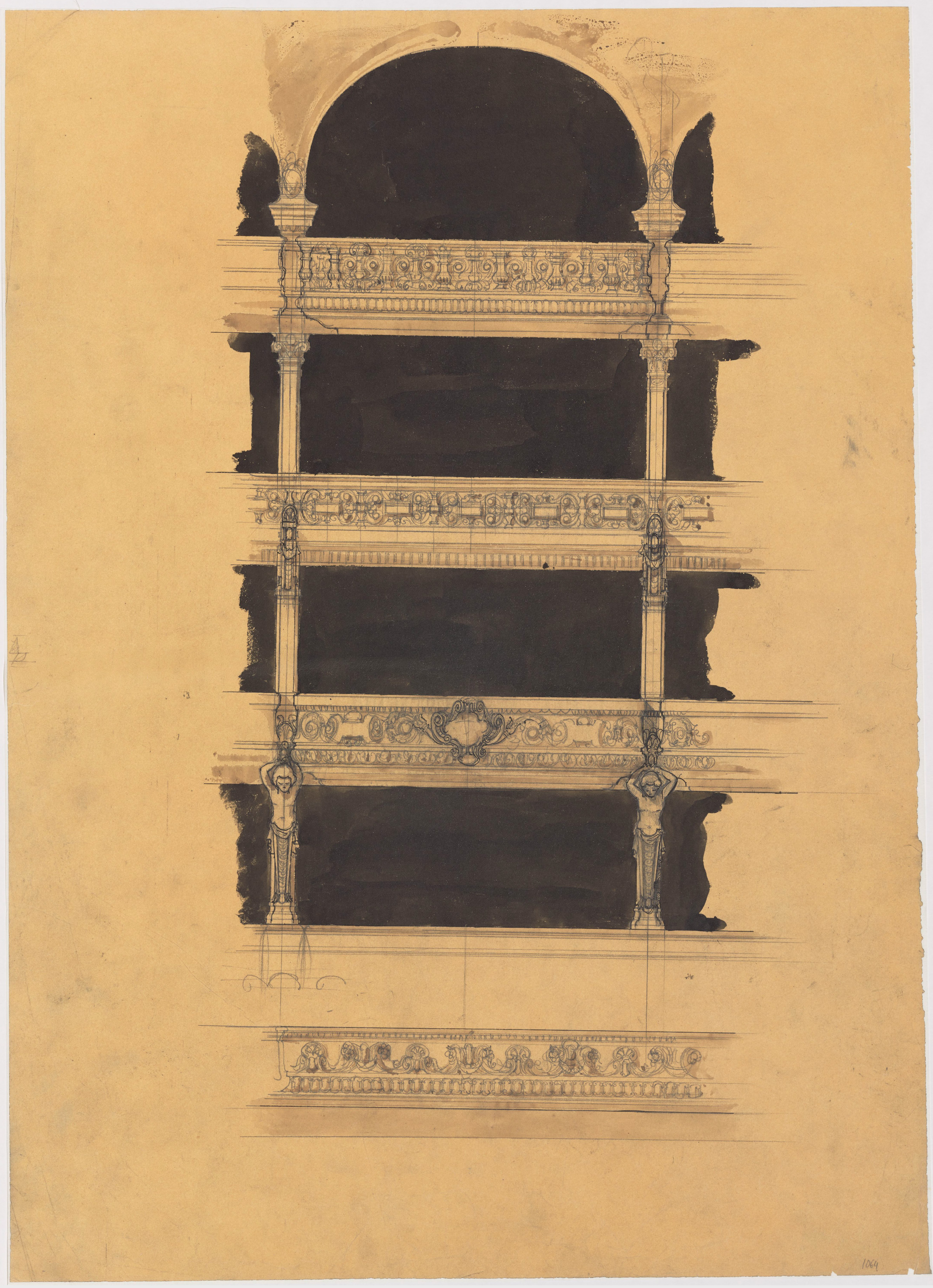
Elevation of the rear galleries

== Notable premieres ==
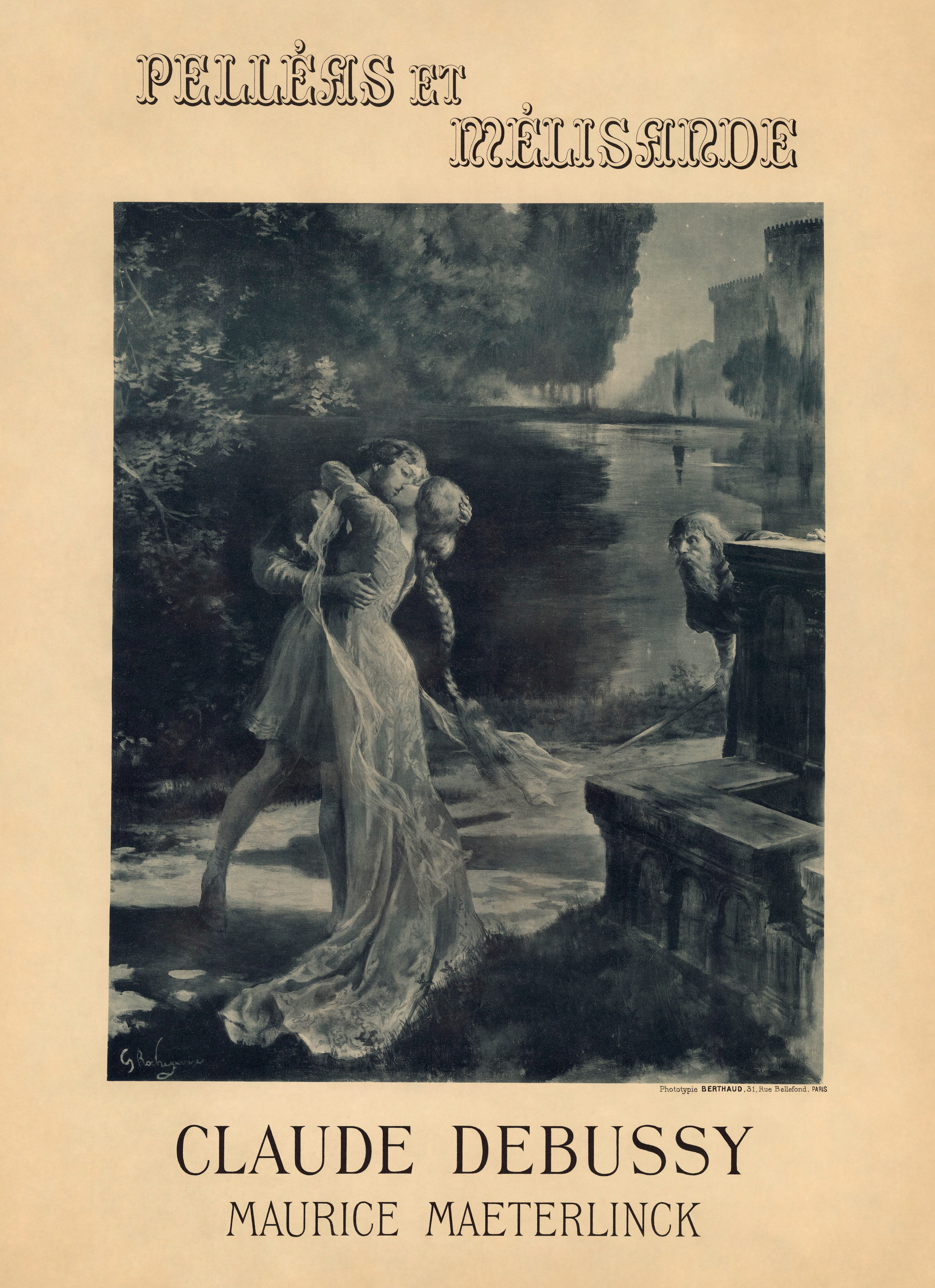
Poster for the 1902 première of Pelléas et Mélisande

- Cendrillon by Massenet (24 May 1899)
- Louise by Charpentier (2 February 1900)
- Pelléas et Mélisande by Debussy (30 April 1902)
- Ariane et Barbe-Bleue by Dukas (10 May 1907)
- Macbeth by Bloch (30 November 1910)
- L'heure espagnole by Ravel (19 May 1911)
- Le pauvre matelot by Milhaud (16 December 1927)
- Les mamelles de Tirésias by Poulenc (3 June 1947)
- La voix humaine by Poulenc (6 February 1959)
- L'inondation by Filidei (27 September 2019)

== Bibliography ==
- Ayers, Andrew (2004). The Architecture of Paris. Stuttgart; London: Edition Axel Menges. ISBN 9783930698967.
- Mead, Christopher Curtis (1996). "Bernier, Stanislas-Louis", vol. 3, pp. 826–827, in The Dictionary of Art, edited by Jane Turner. London: Macmillan. ISBN 9781884446009. Also at Oxford Art Online (subscription, Wikipedia Library access or UK public library membership required).
- Simeone, Nigel (2000). Paris: A Musical Gazetteer. Yale University Press. ISBN 9780300080537.
- Wild, Nicole ([1989]). Dictionnaire des théâtres parisiens au XIXe siècle: les théâtres et la musique. Paris: Aux Amateurs de livres. ISBN 9780828825863. ISBN 9782905053800 (paperback). View formats and editions at WorldCat.
