= Pierre Mareschal =

French cinematographer for television

- Occupation: Cinematographer
- Years active: 1965–1984

Pierre Mareschal is a French cinematographer for television.

== Selected filmography ==
| Year | Title | Notes |
|---|---|---|
| 1971, 1978 | Les enquêtes du commissaire Maigret | TV series (3 episodes) |
| 1970 | Mauregard | Miniseries |
| 1972 | Les Rois maudits | Miniseries |
| 1973 | Poof | TV movie |
| 1981 | Vendredi ou la Vie sauvage | TV movie |
| 1983 | Le Crime de Pierre Lacaze | TV movie |
