= Un mari à prix fixe =

1965 film

- Directed by: Claude de Givray
- Written by: Roger Hanin
- Produced by: Christine Gouze-Rénal
- Starring: Anna Karina
- Cinematography: Raymond Lemoigne
- Release date: 26 July 1965
- Country: France
- Language: French

Un mari à prix fixe is a 1965 French film directed by Claude de Givray and starring Anna Karina.

== Cast ==
- Anna Karina as Béatrice Reinhoff
- Roger Hanin as Romain de Brétigny
- Gabrielle Dorziat as Mme Reinhoff, the mother
- Hubert Noël as Norbert Besson
- Gregor von Rezzori as Konrad Reinhoff
- Marcel Charvey as Me Luxeuil
- Guy d'Avout
- Christian de Tillière
- Henry Gicquel
- Max Montavon
- Michel Peyrelon
- Marcelle Tassencourt as Gertrude Luxeuil
- Colette Teissèdre as Jeanne
- Pierre Vernier as the beekeeper
