= Richard Leduc =

French actor (1941–2022)

Richard Rene Arthur Leduc (2 October 1941 – 11 November 2022) was a French actor. He appeared in more than thirty films from 1969 to 1999.

== Life and career ==
Leduc made his debut in 1967 television series Les oiseaux rares (The rare birds). He played the lead role of Simon in his feature film debut, Robert Benayoun's 1968 Paris n'existe pas (with Serge Gainsbourg). Shortly thereafter he starred in Alain Robbe-Grillet's Eden and After. In 1970 he played Félix de Vandenesse alongside Delphine Seyrig in Marcel Cravenne's film The lily of the valley, Maxence with Claude Jade in the TV saga Mauregard by Claude de Givray and the leading role of Saint-Brice in We are no longer in the forest. Robbe-Grillet also cast him for N. a pris les dés ..., Benayoun hired him a second time in 1975 for Serious as Pleasure (Sérieux comme le plaisir) as Bruno, co-star of Jane Birkin. In 1974, he played with Niels Arestrup a gay couple in Miss O'Gynie et les hommes fleurs, in which the two men resist the temptations of a young woman.

Leduc continued acting in films and television shows in the 1980s (including Mieux courir vaut with Christian Clavier) and 1990s (including Ce que savait Maisie by Edouard Molinaro), but devoted more time to theatre work.

Leduc died on 11 November 2022, aged 81.

== Selected filmography ==
Film
Year	Title	Role	Notes
1970	Mauregard		
1975	Serious as Pleasure		
1970	Eden and After		
