= Thierry Maulnier =

French journalist and dramatist

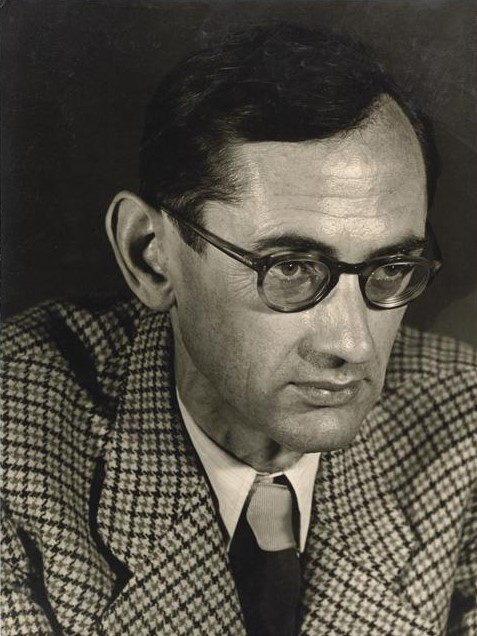
Thierry Maulnier in 1952.

Thierry Maulnier (born Jacques Talagrand; 1 October 1909 – 9 January 1988) was a French journalist, essayist, dramatist, and literary critic who was born in Alès and died in Marnes-la-Coquette. He was married to theatre director Marcelle Tassencourt.

== Early years ==
A graduate of the École Normale Supérieure in the same class as Roger Vailland, Robert Brasillach, and Maurice Bardèche. Maulnier became active in the integralist student wing of Action Française, and published in Charles Maurras' newspaper (L'Action française). He made a career in journalism and took part in the movement of the Non-conformists of the 1930s, inspired by the personalist generation of young intellectuals who shared some of the ideals of the Action Française, holding right-wing beliefs as an answer to a "crisis of civilization" and materialism. He also campaigned against democracy and capitalism, advocating a union of the right and left to overthrow the two. Thierry Maulnier associated with youth periodicals such as Réaction, La Revue du Siècle, and La Revue française; he also wrote his first volume, La crise est dans l'homme ("Crisis Is in Man").

In 1934, he authored, with Jean-Pierre Maxence, the manifesto Demain la France ("Tomorrow, France"). Maxence and Maulnier also founded the weekly L'Insurgé in 1936 lasting only a few months, the magazine circulated nationalist tenets, reviewed in Maulnier's 1938 essay Au-delà du nationalisme ("Beyond Nationalism"). At the same time, he joined Jean de Fabrègues in the creation of a more analytical paper, Combat, one which would be published until France's defeat in World War II.

== World War II and after ==
A regular contributor to L'Action française since 1938, Maulnier continued to publish after Nazi Germany's occupation of France (from 1940); he also started writing for Le Figaro. He ceased writing for the paper after the start of Operation Torch in 1942, and remained a journalist for Le Figaro from 1945 until his death.

With the beginning of the Fourth Republic, Maulnier no longer engaged in politics. He wrote plays (La Course des rois - 1947; Le Profanateur - 1950, La Ville au fond de la mer - 1953, Le Soir du conquérant - 1970) and essays (Violence et conscience - 1945, La Face de méduse du communisme - 1952, L'Europe a fait le monde - 1966, Le Sens des mots - 1976, Les Vaches sacrées - 1977), but also commented on social themes (with Maulnier as a staunch Pro-European).

In 1964, he was elected to the Académie française in place of the deceased Henry Bordeaux. In 1986 he was awarded the Prix mondial Cino Del Duca.

== Works ==
- La crise est dans l'homme (1932)
- Nietzsche (1933)
- Racine (1934)
- Miracle de la Monarchie (1935)
- Mythes socialistes (1938)
- Au-delà du nationalisme (1938)
- Introduction à la poésie française (1939)
- La France, la guerre et la paix (1942, Lyon)
- Violence et conscience (1945)
- Langages (1946)
- Jeanne et ses juges (1952)
- Le Sexe et le néant, directed by Marcelle Tassencourt, Théâtre de l'Athénée (1960)
- Cette Grèce où nous sommes nés (1964)
- La Défaite d'hannibal, followed by La ville au fond de la mer, Gallimard (1968)
- Dialogue inattendu, with Jean Elleinstein, Flammarion (1979)

Theatre

- 1944: Antigone by Robert Garnier, Théâtre Charles de Rochefort, Théâtre du Vieux-Colombier
