= Avant-garde architecture =

Architecture movement

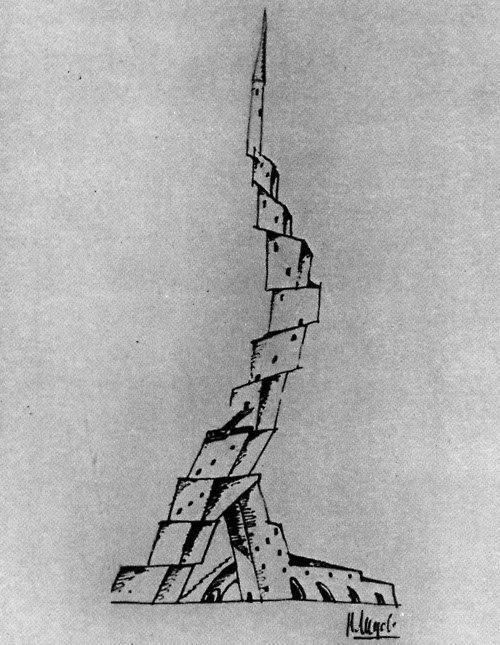
"Collectivist House" – a 1921 sketch by Nikolai Ladovsky, leader of the Rationalist movement

Avant-garde architecture is architecture which is innovative and radical within a certain time period. There have been a variety of architects and movements whose work has been characterised in this way for example modernist architecture was considered avant garde in comparison to Neoclassical architecture in the early 20th century. Other examples include Constructivism, Neoplasticism (De Stijl), Neo-futurism, Deconstructivism, Parametricism, Expressionism, and Neo Avant-Garde.

== Concept ==
Avant-garde architecture has been described as progressive in terms of aesthetics. However, it is noted for covering a broad range of aesthetic and political spectrum. It is associated with the liberal left but also cited as apolitical, right-wing, and conservative in its politics and aesthetics. It is also considered a stream within modernism that is anti-elitist and open to the contamination of mass culture.

The concept draws from the idea of integration of life and art. In the De Stijl Manifesto V, it was stated that art and life are not separate domains, hence, the argument that art is not an illusion or disconnected from reality. This view pushed for the construction of an environment that is according to the creative laws derived from a fixed principle.

A conceptualization by Le Corbusier described avant-garde architecture as constructed for the pleasure of the eye and comes with "inner cleanness, for the course adopted leads to a refusal to allow anything at all which is not correct, authorised, intended, desired, thought-out."

== Criticism ==
Critics note that avant-garde architecture contradicts the very definition of architecture because its position is contrary to its most specific characteristics. There are critics who state that it stands in opposition to the architecture of the classical antiquity. Its importance is said to be exaggerated since it is always marginal to any decisive change. It has been described as part of modern architecture that is the most rarefied and the least social in terms of orientation. It is also noted that many avant-garde architectural projects do not fare well once evaluated according to suitability principles. According to Eileen Gray, it is obsessed with the external at the expense of the interior.

Another argument states that avant-garde architecture is an experiment or that a project is a vehicle for research so that it leads to a built manifesto. For this reason, the avant-garde architect exploits the resources of his clients to achieve his purposes, which go beyond his client's narrow and private interests.

== Architects ==
- Cedric Price
- Daniel Libeskind
- Frank Gehry
- Frei Otto
- Greg Lynn
- Oscar Niemeyer
- Peter Eisenman
- Rem Koolhaas
- Wolf D. Prix
- Zaha Hadid
- Walter Gropius

== Schools and movements ==
- Archigram
- Bauhaus
- Brutalist architecture
- Constructivist architecture
- Metabolism (architecture)
- Neofuturism
- Neoplasticism
- Rationalism (architecture)
- Russian avant-garde architects and their work
- Situationist International
