= Claude de Givray =

French film director

- Born: 7 April 1933 (age 93); Nice, France
- Occupations: Film director Screenwriter
- Years active: 1960–2003

Claude de Givray (born 7 April 1933) is a French film director and screenwriter. In 1960 he was co-director with François Truffaut for Tire-au flanc. He directed the 1965 film Un mari à un prix fixe, which starred Anna Karina. He was François Truffaut's co-writer to his films Stolen Kisses and Bed and Board. Between the two films he wrote and directed the mini-series Mauregard starring Claude Jade, the heroine of the two Truffaut-Films. His last movie as Director was Dernier banco in 1984, starring Jean-Pierre Cassel and Michel Duchaussoy. In 1988 Claude Miller made the film The Little Thief based on a book by de Claude de Givray and Truffaut.

== Selected filmography ==
- The Army Game (1960 - director)
- Un mari à un prix fixe (1965 - director)
- Tight Skirts, Loose Pleasures (1965 - director)
- Stolen Kisses (1968 - writer)
- Mauregard (1969 - writer, director)
- Domicile conjugal (1970 - writer)
- Dernier banco (1984 - writer, director)
- The Little Thief (1988 - writer)
- François Truffaut: Stolen Portraits (1993 - himself)
