= Emmanuelle (1974 film) =

1974 film by Just Jaeckin

- Theatrical release poster (French)
- Directed by: Just Jaeckin
- Screenplay by: Jean-Louis Richard
- Based on: Emmanuelle; 1967 novel by Emmanuelle Arsan
- Produced by: Yves Rousset-Rouard
- Starring: Alain Cuny; Sylvia Kristel; Marika Green; Daniel Sarky
- Cinematography: Richard Suzuki; Robert Fraisse
- Edited by: Claudine Bouché
- Music by: Pierre Bachelet
- Production companies: Trinacra Films; Orphée Productions
- Distributed by: Parafrance Films
- Release date: 26 June 1974 (Paris)
- Running time: 94 minutes
- Country: France
- Language: French
- Box office: 8.9 million admissions (France) $20.2 million (overseas)

Emmanuelle is a 1974 French erotic drama film directed by Just Jaeckin. It is the first installment in a series of French softcore pornography films based on the novel Emmanuelle by Emmanuelle Arsan. It stars Sylvia Kristel in the title role about a woman who takes a trip to Bangkok to enhance her sexual experience.

The film was former photographer Jaeckin's debut feature film and was shot on location in Thailand and in France between 1973 and 1974. It was received negatively by critics on its initial release and with a more mixed reception years later. On its initial release in France, it was one of the highest-grossing French films, The film was distributed by Columbia Pictures in the United States, making it the first X-rated film released by the company. The film was popular in Europe, the United States, and Asia.

Emmanuelle spawned a film series with multiple sequels, including six theatrical films and seven made-for-television films, with Kristel reprising her role in eleven entries of the original series. It was followed by a sequel titled Emmanuelle 2 (1975), while a reboot of the series was released in 2024 in France.

The film was also the inspiration for several unrelated films and series, including the Italian series Black Emanuelle, or the American series Emmanuelle in Space, as well as many unofficial productions using the Emmanuelle name.

== Plot ==
Emmanuelle flies to Bangkok to meet her diplomat husband Jean. He asks her if she had any other lovers while she was in Paris; Emmanuelle replies that she has not. After taking a nude swim, she is approached by Marie-Ange, a young girl. Marie-Ange later visits Emmanuelle, finds her sleeping and takes advantage of the situation to feel her body. Emmanuelle wakes up, and they go outside, where Marie-Ange asks her if she has any photos of herself and Jean having sex. After Emmanuelle replies she does not, Marie-Ange takes a French magazine with a photo of the actor Paul Newman and begins to masturbate in front of her. Emmanuelle confesses to Marie-Ange that while she did not cheat on her husband in Paris, she did have sex with two strangers on the flight over to Bangkok. Emmanuelle begins to masturbate as she recounts the tryst. At night, she tells Jean about Marie-Ange's lack of shame, which leads to Jean encouraging her to pursue the friendship.

The next day at a party, Marie-Ange introduces Emmanuelle to one of her lovers, an older man named Mario. Emmanuelle then sees Bee, a French archaeologist who is outside of most of the expatriate circles. She strikes up a private conversation with Bee and hands her a bracelet. At Emmanuelle's insistence, Bee agrees to meet her at the Watsai klong. However, once they are there, Bee seems uninterested. She attempts to return the bracelet, but Emmanuelle refuses to take it back. Undeterred, Emmanuelle gets on Bee's jeep as she is about to leave for a dig site. Meanwhile, Jean is angry that Emmanuelle has left without informing him and suspects that her squash partner Ariane is behind it. Ariane does not know, and says that all she has to offer is consolation sex. After a horseback ride, Emmanuelle and Bee reach a waterfall site where they take a bath. At the dig site, Emmanuelle flirts with Bee while she is working. The two have sex, but afterward, Bee asks Emmanuelle to leave. Emmanuelle returns home in tears, feeling humiliated. Jean tries to comfort her and suggests that she should take another lover.

The next day Emmanuelle and Ariane attempt to play squash but have an argument. Ariane seems jealous of Bee, as she had hoped to be Emmanuelle's first female lover. On the other side, Emmanuelle is displeased at Ariane for having sex with Jean. Frustrated, Emmanuelle decides to meet with Mario, stating that at his age, making love becomes so difficult that any man capable of it must be an artist.

At dinner, Mario tells Emmanuelle that monogamy will soon die out and that she must learn to let lust, rather than guilt or reason, guide her when it comes to sex. This will lead her to greater levels of pleasure. To instill this lesson, Mario takes her to an opium den. There, she is raped by one of the denizens while Mario watches. Mario then takes Emmanuelle to a boxing ring, where he talks two young men into fighting each other for the right to have sex with her. Mario tells Emmanuelle to choose one of the men as her favorite. In the match, her chosen champion prevails. Aroused by his willingness to fight for her, she licks the sweat on his forehead and allows him to have sex with her.

Later, Emmanuelle is awakened by Mario, who tells her to change into a dress with a zipper down the back, allowing him to strip her instantly for her next sexual encounter. Emmanuelle protests that she is tired and asks Mario if he will ever have sex with her. Mario replies that he is waiting for the "next Emmanuelle". Emmanuelle then sits at a mirror and applies makeup, hoping that, by following Mario's instructions, she will reach the higher levels of pleasure that he has promised.

== Cast ==
- Alain Cuny as Mario
- Sylvia Kristel as Emmanuelle
- Marika Green as Bee
- Daniel Sarky as Jean
- Jeanne Colletin as Ariane
- Christine Boisson as Marie-Ange

== Production ==
=== Pre-production ===
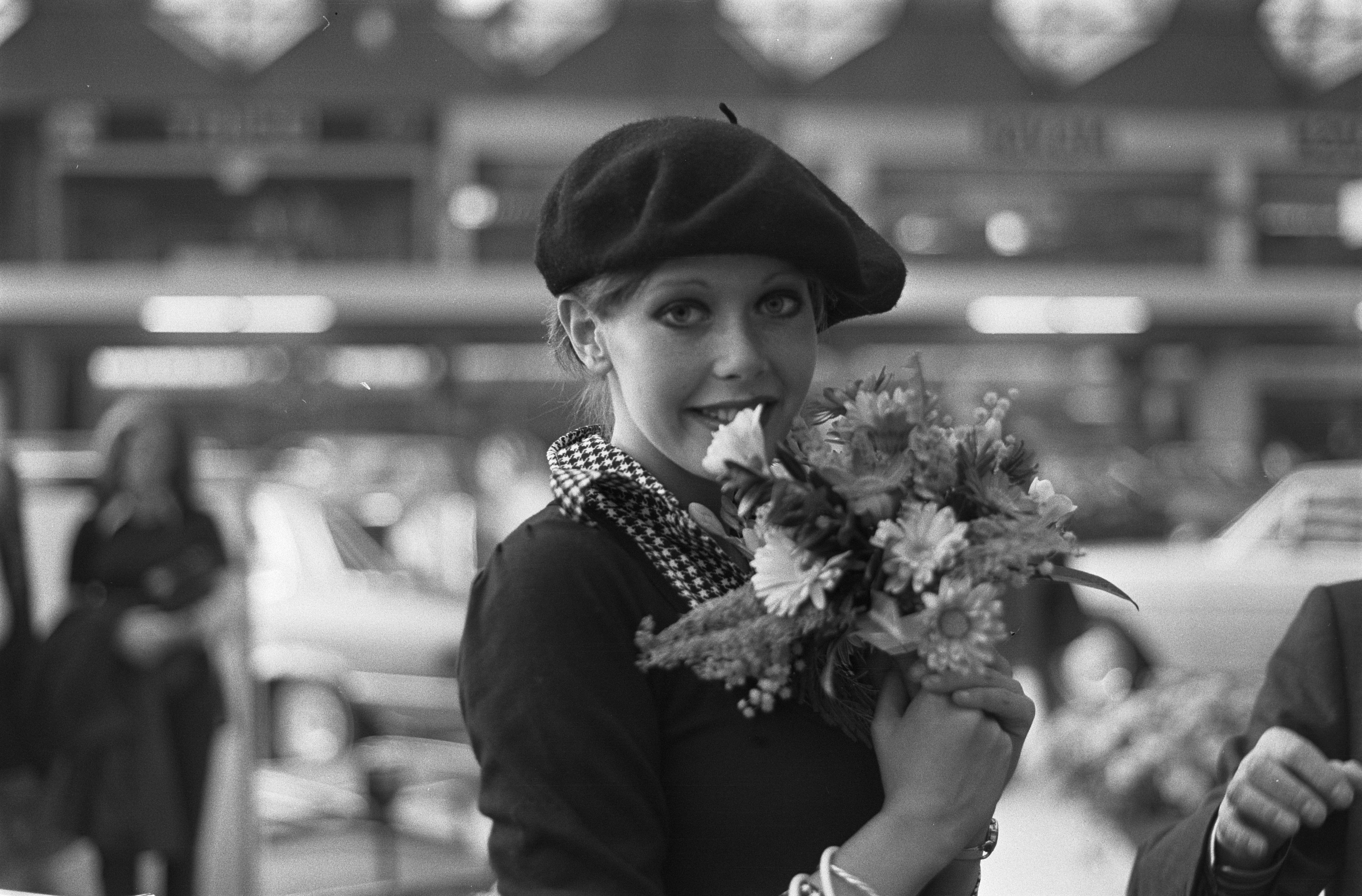
Sylvia Kristel, who played the eponymous character, in 1973

Due to the success of the film of Last Tango in Paris which contained explicit sexual scenes and rise of interest in hardcore pornography, producers became aware of an audience that was willing to watch adult films.

Producer Yves Rousset-Rouard obtained the rights to the novel Emmanuelle in 1972. Emmanuelle was not the first adaptation of that novel; the first was an adaptation made in the late 1960s by producer Pierre Thron which was less explicit than the original novel. Rousset-Rouard offered the film to artist and photographer Just Jaeckin, who had never directed a feature film previously. After reading the novel, Jaeckin felt daunted by the film's subject matter and agreed with Rousset-Rouard to make what he described as "something soft and beautiful with a nice story".

=== Casting ===
Casting sessions were held throughout Europe to find the right actress to play the leading role. According to Sylvia Kristel, she auditioned for the film by accident, having planned to audition for a commercial and entering the wrong door. She auditioned in clothing with a simple tie-up string that came off accidentally during the interview; she continued to take interview questions as if nothing had happened. After taking some nude photographs of Kristel, Jaeckin hired her for the role of Emmanuelle.

=== Filming ===
Emmanuelle was shot between December 10, 1973, and February 6, 1974. The film was shot on location in Thailand while interior shots were done in Paris, France.

Kristel found it very difficult to film the scene involving Emmanuelle being raped by two men in an opium den in Bangkok. Kristel stated that she "couldn't see how a rape would be pleasurable. These two Thai people were not actors. I really had to fight for my life there." The scene was filmed in one take using several cameras. Jaeckin has denied directing the scene that involves a young woman in a Thai bar who smokes a cigarette out of her vagina. Just Jaeckin states he first saw that scene when viewing the film in a theater. The horseback ride of Emmanuelle and Bee was filmed with a camera man as a double for Sylvia Kristel, who did not know how to ride.

Sylvia Kristel accidentally arrived at the Emmanuelle auditions, where the director Just Jaeckin offered her the role. "He asked me to take my dress off," she said. "Luckily it was an easy dress to take off. It had spaghetti straps which I just slipped over my shoulders and it just fell off. I carried on talking and smoking in the nude. I was not inhibited at all. I'd done nude modeling and he thought I was very graceful."

Christine Boisson was 17 years old when she got her first role in this film. While her parents signed a release so that, as a minor, she could shoot in this erotic film, her mother never stopped putting her down, repeating "Do you think your father is proud to have a daughter who shoots in Emmanuelle?", while pocketing her entire fee.

=== Post-production ===
The soundtrack to Emmanuelle was composed by Pierre Bachelet. The online music database AllMusic described the soundtrack to Emmanuelle as "both more sophisticated and more banal than your average stroke-film soundtrack" as well as stating that "the composers strive for a complexity and intimacy largely absent from the genre". The review compared pieces of the music anticipating the music of British musician Brian Eno's ambient music. The soundtrack employs synthesizers and acoustic guitar. The film featured tracks that were nearly indistinguishable from the King Crimson song "Larks' Tongues in Aspic Part Two". Robert Fripp, in order to prove the similarities of the two songs, had to sit and record the entire film in a theatre, he would later get the credit for composing the track.

== Release ==
In the United States, Emmanuelle was marketed without a focus on its exploitative nature. The tagline "X was never like this" was developed to give the audience a suggestion that the film was not like other x-rated films.

The film was initially held up for several months by French censorship authorities, but permission was given after Valéry Giscard d'Estaing had won the Presidential elections in May 1974. Emmanuelle was released in France on June 26, 1974. The film sold 8.89 million tickets in France. One theatre on the Champs-Élysées in Paris played the film for 13 years.

In the United Kingdom, Emmanuelle was the first adult film to play in regular British theaters after receiving extensive BBFC cuts to most of the sex scenes. For its initial video release in 1990 the scene in the bar where a woman smokes a cigarette from her vagina and the scene where the character Mario encourages the rape of Emmanuelle were cut. These edits were eventually waived for the 2007 Optimum DVD release.

Emmanuelle was distributed in the United States by Columbia Pictures and was their first X rated film. Columbia agreed to distribute the film after learning that the audience seen in line for Emmanuelle was mostly women. The advertising for the film took a highbrow approach to marketing the film opposed to focusing on its exploitative nature. Columbia's president David Begelman and former Young & Rubicam president Steve Frankfurt developed the tagline for the film "X was never like this." This tagline was developed to give the audience an ambiguous reaction suggesting that the film was either more graphic than other X-rated films or more sophisticated and artistic. Jay Cocks described its promotion in Time, stating "No exclusive linage in the sex sheets, no adhesive stickers for the walls of public toilets. Emmanuelle is being hyped as a classier breed of porn."

== Box office ==
In France, the film sold 8,893,996 admissions at the box office.

Overseas, the film earned $11.5 million at United States box office. and it helped Columbia to recoup from their losses after the box office failure of Lost Horizon in 1973. It also earned ¥2.6 billion ($8.7 million) in Japan, bringing its overseas gross to $20.2 million.

== Reception ==
The film received generally negative reviews from American critics on its initial release. Variety described Jaeckin's direction as "a bit pompous" and that outside Alain Cuny, the "acting is a bit self-conscious." Roger Ebert was one of the few American critics who gave the film a positive review. Ebert stated that "in terms of its genre (softcore skin flick), it's very well done: lushly photographed on location in Thailand, filled with attractive and intriguing people, and scored with brittle, teasing music. Now that hardcore porno has become passe, it's a relief to see a movie that drops the gynecology and returns to a certain amount of sexy sophistication." The Monthly Film Bulletin described the film as "lacking both in spirit and eroticism, while celebrating all the fashion textures of sun-on-skin and producing a series of advertisements for what can only be described as 2-D sex."

Later reviews had mixed opinions. PopMatters gave the film a seven out of ten rating, describing it as holding "up as not just an erotic classic, but a cinematic classic, period." The A.V. Club gave the film a "C" rating, stating that "it remains easy to get seduced by the film's slightly druggy, brainless sexiness" but that the film's subtext has not aged well, noting that the "film makes a lot of noise about 'sexual freedom' — the climactic scene in which the locals gang-rape Kristel while Cuny's silver-haired lech looks on – the question arises of just whose fantasy this is...and who's supposed to be freed by it." TV Guide gave the film two and a half stars out of four, finding that the film took itself too seriously but that it was still a "relatively well-made picture." Empire gave the film three stars out of five, noting that "Sylvia Kristel gives the essential take on the character, adding a sweetness and innocence, actually giving the traces of a performance" between the sex scenes. Total Film awarded the film three stars out of five, finding its "theme of sensual discovery chimed with the feisty zeitgeist," and "the rest of the film is daft, camp, over-oiled and dubbed to death, and yet... it's still a thrill."

On the review aggregator website Rotten Tomatoes, 35% of 17 critics' reviews are positive.

=== Feminist reception ===
In France, feminist viewers complained that the character of Emmanuelle was "an object of male fantasies." In a review from 1974, Variety opined that Emmanuelle was "more a come-on for the civil service than for femme lib."

Film historian Danny Shipka wrote that "In Asia, many women saw it as a liberating piece focusing on the power and strength of Emmanuelle and not her exploitation." Sylvia Kristel stated that "Japanese feminists were rather delighted with the film because they thought Emmanuelle was dominant, just because of this one scene where she climbs on top of her husband. That was the moment when all the Japanese women stood up and applauded."

== Legacy ==
- Emmanuelle was followed by a sequel titled Emmanuelle, The Joys of a Woman in 1975. Not wanting to be the director for the series, Just Jaeckin suggested his friend, fashion photographer Francis Giacobetti, direct the film.
- The film spawned a film series with Emmanuelle 2 (1975), Goodbye Emmanuelle (1977), and Emmanuelle 4 (1984) in which Kristel reprise her role as Emmanuelle. In Emmanuelle 5 (1987) and Emmanuelle 6 (1988), she was replaced with other actresses. She returned for Emmanuelle 7 (1993), which was the last film from the original series to be released in theaters. It was followed by seven made-for-television films in which Kristel reprised her role as an older Emmanuelle, and with Marcela Walerstein as the younger version of the character. A reboot of the series was released in France in September 2024.

Italian film producers wanted to capitalize on the international popularity of Emmanuelle by making a similar product that could be made cheaply. To work around copyright rules, these producers altered their spelling of Emmanuelle to create their series Black Emanuelle, starring Laura Gemser. The British comedy film Carry On Emmannuelle is a parody of the Emmanuelle series. In Japan, the film popularized the phrase "emanieru suru," which directly translates to "to do Emmanuelle," meaning "to have a casual and extravagant love affair." A later film making use of the Emmanuelle title is Emmanuelle in Soho (1981).

== See also ==
- List of cult films
- List of French films of 1974
