= Lady Chatterley's Lover (disambiguation) =

Lady Chatterley's Lover is a 1928 novel by D. H. Lawrence.

Lady Chatterley's Lover or Lady Chatterley may also refer to:

- Lady Chatterley's Lover (1955 film), French film
- Lady Chatterley's Lover (1981 film), British film
- Lady Chatterley's Lover (2015 film), British film
- Lady Chatterley's Lover (2022 film), British film
- Lady Chatterley (TV serial), 1993 BBC TV film
- Lady Chatterley (film), 2006 French film based upon John Thomas and Lady Jane
