= Emmanuelle 5 =

- Film poster
- Directed by: Walerian Borowczyk
- Written by: Emmanuelle Arsan (novel); Walerian Borowczyk (screenplay); Alex Cunningham (screenplay)
- Produced by: Alain Siritzky
- Starring: Monique Gabrielle; Crofton Hardester; Dana Burns Westburg; Yaseen Khan
- Cinematography: Jean-Claude Reboul
- Edited by: Frank Mathieu
- Music by: Pierre Bachelet
- Distributed by: AAA – Acteurs Auteurs Associés
- Release date: January 7, 1987 (FR)
- Running time: 85 minutes
- Country: France
- Language: English

Emmanuelle 5 is a 1987 English-language French film directed by Walerian Borowczyk. It is a sequel to 1984's Emmanuelle 4 and the fifth installment in the film series of the same name. It was followed by a sequel, Emmanuelle 6, released in 1988.

== Overview ==
In 1985, ASP films (owner of the Emmanuelle franchise since the first official feature) approached Polish director Borowczyk (known for his heavily erotic art films) to helm the latest Emmanuelle feature, and he accepted, intrigued by the idea of giving a new spin to the series and character. "She is free, without prejudice, and she has confidence in herself" he told France's Cinema magazine in the April 87 issue. Once in production, however, he was to be in conflict with his producers; first over the casting of his lead actress, and later for his abstract imagery and script.

Emmanuelle 5 is 85 minutes long, shortened after the director himself sheared the film of several scenes of dialog and exposition, preferring to lay voice-overs to scenes of erotic visual montages. Shot in English sync-sound, it also features the first American actress to play the Emmanuelle character. The film shoot took place on location in Paris, Cannes, and the island of Réunion from May 26 to July 19 in the year 1986.

French distributor AAA gave Emmanuelle 5 a push in print ads and promotional posters, all touting filmgoers with the Borowczyk name. A series of six different styles of poster were designed by artist Léo Kouper. The posters all bore different quotes from writer Emmanuelle Arsan, endorsing the work of Borowczyk.

Amidst critiques to Emmanuelle 5, there were also rumors Borowczyk didn't actually direct anything but the "film within a film" Love Express sequence. This was mostly because he utilized a series of assistant directors for certain exteriors, namely the Cannes and Middle-Eastern segments. The film, however, contains his trademark lighting, the handwritten notes and drawings, themes of censorship and hypocrisy.

Despite the critical backlash, Emmanuelle 5 did well in France, staying in theaters for 26 weeks, and spawning yet another theatrical sequel.

== Plot ==
Emmanuelle (Monique Gabrielle) is a free-spirited woman who makes erotic arthouse films and runs a dance studio out of her loft in Paris.

The movie opens with a Lifestyles of the Rich and Famous style montage of Cannes, with a documentary-like narration giving us an overview of the famous film festival held there every year. A film within a film, the sequence shows Emmanuelle premiering her latest film, Love Express, in Cannes, causing a scandal in the process. Later, she defends her film at a press conference to reporters who accuse her of creating pornography.

After the Q&A, Emmanuelle's producer introduces her to Prince Rajid (Yaseen Khan), a wealthy despot who owns the fictional Arab country of Benglagistan. He is apparently obsessed with Emmanuelle and wants to premiere the film in his homeland.

Outside, a throng of male fans awaits Emmanuelle, all desperate for a touch of the famed beauty. Things quickly escalate and the mob strips her of every last article of clothing, sending her jumping onto a stranger's departing boat for safety. Her unwitting saviour is Charles D. Foster (Dana Burns Westburg), a young millionaire who disapproves of Emmanuelle's erotic films. The couple quickly fall in love after a night of exciting sex on his yacht.

After an argument with the concerned Foster, Emmanuelle travels to Benglagistan to promote her film, and meets Eddie, an Indiana Jones style danger-seeker who befriends her. Prince Rajid kidnaps her for his harem and decides to make her one of his 50 wives. Eddie helps her escape, and together they run into the jungle. Charles sends an army helicopter to help Emmanuelle. Eddie dies in the shootout but she escapes with the helicopter.

Emmanuelle joins Charles on a midnight plane ride where they drink champagne and make love. The plane quickly falters and crashes into the mountains near Las Vegas. After being rescued and returning home to mourn her dead lover, she receives a note and flowers and realizes Foster is alive and loves only her.

== Cast ==
- Monique Gabrielle as Emmanuelle
- Crofton Hardester as Eddie
- Dana Burns Westburg as Charles D. Foster
- Yaseen Khan as Prince Rajid
- Julie Miklas as Linda (uncredited)
- Pamm Vlastas as Suvi (uncredited)
- Heidi Paine as Girl #1 (uncredited)
- Roxanna Michaels as Girl #2 (uncredited)
- Michele Burger as Girl #3 (uncredited)
- Max Strom as Talking Soldier (uncredited)

== Versions ==
There are at least three versions:

- The theatrical European version (also dubbed into French, Italian and German), known as "the Borowczyk" version.
- The US version, including new scenes produced by Roger Corman, and directed by Steve Barnett. Members of the original cast, as well as new actors, were brought to Los Angeles a year later to shoot the additional footage. This version was completed in 1987, and also utilizes Borowczyk's out-takes. The new scenes are quite different from the traditional European style that people expect from Emmanuelle films, and are more in the vein of 80s sex-comedy in the style of Bachelor Party. The attempt was to give the story more cohesion, and tighten the pacing, making it more commercial. No final film print edit was done, it was all put together on 3/4 video with a series of fade-ins and bleeds. After a few years, Corman's New Horizon imprint opted for a home video release in 1992, only available in a full-screen transfer. It never screened theatrically. Available on New Horizons DVD in the US.
- The French home video version, including hard-core sex scenes that don't feature any of the principal cast. This version is trimmed of several minutes of footage found in the theatrical European version. Released in France by Carrere Video on VHS, dubbed. Out of print, never released on DVD in an uncut form. Released in 2006 by Lionsgate UK on DVD (In a cut version removing all hardcore footage), fullscreen. Also available in Greece from Arcadia Digital, in a widescreen, letterboxed version.

== Score ==
French popstar Pierre Bachelet returns to score his second Emmanuelle film, following his successful soundtrack for the debut feature film in 1974.

The Emmanuelle 5 soundtrack is more lush Europop, this time featuring 80s style synth in addition to the guitars and vocals (by Sandy Stevenson and Bachelet himself). There are also exotic middle-Eastern sounding tracks, in keeping with the film's harem sub-plot.

It was never released on LP or CD, unusual for a Bachelet score. It remains highly coveted by his fans, and those of the Emmanuelle franchise.

== See also ==
- Emmanuelle (1974)
- Emmanuelle 2 (1975)
- Goodbye Emmanuelle (1977)
- Emmanuelle 4 (1984)
- Emmanuelle 6 (1988)
- Emmanuelle 7 (1992)
