= Umberto Orsini =

Italian actor (born 1934)

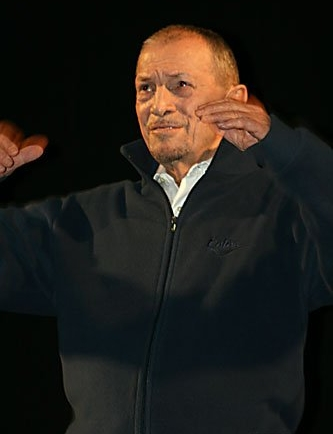
- Orsini in March 2008
- Born: 2 April 1934 (age 92); Novara, Province of Novara, Italy
- Education: Accademia Nazionale di Arte Drammatica Silvio D'Amico
- Occupation: Actor
- Years active: 1960–present

Umberto Orsini (born 2 April 1934) is an Italian actor. He achieved prominence as a stage actor in Luchino Visconti's company, before becoming known to general audiences for his roles in RAI television dramas. He won the Nastro d'Argento for Best Supporting Actor for his performance in Visconti's The Damned (1969), and was nominated for the David di Donatello for Best Supporting Actor for his role in The Early Bird Catches the Worm (2008).

== Early life ==
Orisini was born in Novara in the Piedmont region of northern Italy, on 2 April 1934. Prior to pursuing an acting career, he worked as a notary. He enrolled in the Accademia Nazionale di Arte Drammatica Silvio D'Amico in Rome, and graduated in 1954.

== Career ==
He began his professional stage career as a founding member of Milan's Compagnia dei Giovani, under the direction of Giorgio De Lullo and Romolo Valli. He performed with the Paolo Stoppa and Rina Morelli's company in a 1960 production of L'Arialda, directed by Luchino Visconti, and achieved critical praise for his performance as 'Nick' in a production of Who's Afraid of Virginia Woolf?, opposite Enrico Maria Salerno. He performed extensively with Gabriele Lavia for the Teatro Eliseo, of which he was the artistic director between 1980 and 1997.

After a minor role in Federico Fellini's La Dolce Vita, Orsini made his official film debut in the 1960 film Love in Rome. After several supporting roles, including in the star-studded international production Candy, Orsini made his breakthrough in Visconti's The Damned, playing a disillusioned industrialist in 1930s Germany whose anti-Nazi views leave him a target of the new regime. The role earned Orsini praise from Italian critics, and he won that year's Nastro d'Argento for Best Supporting Actor.

He would collaborate again with Visconti in the 1973 historical epic Ludwig, which also reunited him with Damned co-stars Helmut Berger and Helmut Griem. Outside his native Italy, Orsini also worked in French cinema, notably playing the husband of the title character in Emmanuelle 2 and Goodbye Emmanuelle.

Orsini found success on Italian television, becoming a regular fixture of RAI programming. He co-hosted the Sunday morning cooking show Colazione allo studio 7 with Luigi Veronelli.

== Personal life ==
Orsini was romantically involved with Ellen Kessler for 20 years.

== Filmography ==
=== Film ===
Year	English title	Original title	Role	Director	Notes
1957	Marisa la civetta		Sailor	Mauro Bolognini	Uncredited
1960	Love in Rome	Un amore a Roma	Peppino Barlacchi	Dino Risi	
1960	La Dolce Vita		Man in Shades	Federico Fellini	Uncredited
1960	Chiamate 22-22 tenente Sheridan		Tommy	Giorgio Bianchi	
1961	Io bacio... tu baci		Paolo	Piero Vivarelli	
1961	Battle of the Worlds	Il Pianeta degli uomini spenti	Dr. Fred Steele	Antonio Margheriti	
1961	Caccia all'uomo		Giovanni Maimonti	Riccardo Freda	
1962	The Sea	Il mare	The Actor	Giuseppe Patroni Griffi	
1963	The Shortest Day	Il giorno più corto	Soldier	Sergio Corbucci	Uncredited
1963	Noche de verano		Miguel Solinas	Jorge Grau	
1963	Don't Tempt the Devil	Les Bonnes Causes	Philliet	Christian-Jaque	
1963	Sweet Skin	Strip-tease	Dancer	Jacques Poitrenaud	
1965	The Myth	La violenza e l'amore	Roberto	Adimaro Sala	
1966	Playgirl		Timo	Will Tremper	
1966	Mademoiselle		Antonio	Tony Richardson	
1966	The Steps	Ta skalopatia	Roberto	Leonard Hirschfield	
1967	The Sailor from Gibraltar		Postcard Vendor	Tony Richardson	
1967	The Girl and the General	La Ragazza e il Generale	Pvt. Tarasconi	Pasquale Festa Campanile	
1968	Candy		The Big Guy	Christian Marquand	
1969	The Damned	La caduta degli dei	Herbert Thallman	Luchino Visconti	
1969	Interrabang		Fabrizio Berti	Giuliano Biagetti	
1970	A Big Grey-Blue Bird	Ein großer graublauer Vogel	Morelli	Thomas Schamoni	
1970	Violent City	Città violenta	Steve	Sergio Sollima	
1970	Bali	Incontro d'amore	Carlo	Ugo Liberatore	
1971	Roma Bene		Prince Rubio Marescalli	Carlo Lizzani	
1972	Shadows Unseen	Abuso di potere	Enrico Gagliardi	Camillo Bazzoni	
1972	César and Rosalie	César et Rosalie	Antoine	Claude Sautet	
1972	I figli chiedono perché		Michèle's Father	Nino Zanchin	
1972	The Outside Man	Un homme est mort	Alex Kovacs	Jacques Deray	
1973	La Tosca		Cesare Angelotti	Luigi Magni	
1973	Ludwig		Count Maximilian von Holnstein	Luchino Visconti	
1973	The Assassination of Matteotti	Il delitto Matteotti	Amerigo Dumini	Florestano Vancini	
1973	No Way Out	Tony Arzenta	Isnello	Duccio Tessari	
1973	Story of a Cloistered Nun	Storia di una monaca di clausura	Don Diego	Domenico Paolella	
1974	Puzzle	L’uomo senza memoria	Daniele	Duccio Tessari	
1974	Verdict		Doctor	André Cayatte	Uncredited
1974	Vincent, François, Paul and the Others	Vincent, François, Paul et les autres	Jacques	Claude Sautet	
1974	The Antichrist	L'anticristo	Dr. Marcello Sinibaldi	Alberto De Martino	
1975	Smiling Maniacs	Corruzione al palazzo di giustizia	Erzi	Marcello Aliprandi	
1975	Emmanuelle 2	Emmanuelle: L'antivierge	Jean	Francis Giacobetti	
1976	Perdutamente tuo... mi firmo Macaluso Carmelo fu Giuseppe		Vito Buscemi	Vittorio Sindoni	
1976	A Woman at Her Window	Une femme à sa fenêtre	Rico Santorini	Pierre Granier-Deferre	
1977	A Straight Laced Girl	Une fille cousue de fil blanc	Frédéric	Michel Lang	
1977	Casanova & Co.		Count Tiretta	Franz Antel	
1977	Gangbuster	L'avvocato della mala	Farnese	Alberto Marras	
1977	Beyond Good and Evil	Al di là del bene e del male	Bernhard Förster	Liliana Cavani	
1977	Goodbye Emmanuelle		Jean	François Leterrier	
1978	The Fifth Commandment	L'alba dei falsi dei	Sturmführer Hannacker / Vater Redder	Duccio Tessari	
1978	Little Girl in Blue Velvet	La petite fille en velours bleu	Fabrizio Conti	Alan Bridges	
1978	Other People's Money	L'argent des autres	Blue	Christian de Chalonge	
1980	Strawberry Blonde	Bionda fragola	Antonio	Mino Bellei	
1994	Elles n'oublient jamais		Vienne	Christopher Frank	
1995	Who Killed Pasolini?	Pasolini, un delitto italiano	Magistrate	Marco Tullio Giordana	
1997	The Bride's Journey	Il viaggio della Sposa	Don Diego	Sergio Rubini	
1998	L'ospite		Antonio	Alessandro Colizzi	
2000	Johnny the Partisan	Il partigiano Johnny	Pinin	Guido Chiesa	
2003	Hannover		Aiello	Ferdinando Vicentini Orgnani	
2004	Love Returns	L'amore ritorna	Dr. Ambrosini	Sergio Rubini	
2008	The Early Bird Catches the Worm	Il mattino ha l'oro in bocca	Uncle Lino	Francesco Patierno	
2017	Agadah		Belial	Alberto Rondalli	
2022	Marcel!		Nonno	Jasmine Trinca	
2024	Trifole		Igor	Gabriele Fabbro	

=== Television ===
Year	Title	Role	Notes
1959-60	Giallo club. Invito al poliziesco	Ronald / Robert	2 episodes
1960	La casa sull'acqua	Luca	Television film
1963	Lo zoo di vetro	Tom Wingfield	Television film
1963	Gli spettri	Oswald Alving	Television film
1964	I grandi camaleonti	Tallien	Miniseries: 4 episodes
1964	Vita di Michelangelo	Tommaso dei Cavalieri	Episode #1.3
1964	Biblioteca di Studio Uno	Brent Tarleton	Episode: "La storia di Rossella O'Hara"
1965	Coriolano	Tullo Aufidio	Television film
1965	La figlia del capitano	Pyotr Andreyich Grinyov	Miniseries: 6 episodes
1966	Il re	Duca di Savoia	Television film
1968	Morte di un commesso viaggiatore	Biff Loman	Television film
1969	I fratelli Karamazov	Ivan Karamazov	Miniseries: 6 episodes
1977	Processo a Maria Tarnowska	Demiat Prilukoff	Miniseries: 3 episodes
1978	Cinéma 16	Clown	Episode: "Thomas Guérin, retraité"
1979	Racconti di fantascienza	General Guarnerius	Episode: "O.B.N. in arrivo"
1979	I racconti fantastici di Edgar Allan Poe	Robert Usher	Episode: "Ligeia forever"
1980	Orient-Express	Gaetano	Episode: "Jane"
1982	Colomba	Colonel Neville	Television film
1984	Notti e nebbie	Bruno Spada	Television film
1997	Solomon	Nathan	Television film
1999	Esther	Memucan	Television film
2000	Lourdes	Père Laurent	Television film
2000	Paul the Apostle	Tribune	Miniseries: 2 episodes
2013	Gourmet Wars	Leone	11 episodes

== Awards and recognition ==
Award	Year	Category	Work	Result
David di Donatello	2008	Best Supporting Actor	The Early Bird Catches the Worm	Nominated
Nastro d'Argento	1970	Best Supporting Actor	The Damned	Won
Kineo Award	2008	Best Supporting Actor	The Early Bird Catches the Worm	Nominated
