= Truffle pig =

Domestic pig trained to find edible fungi

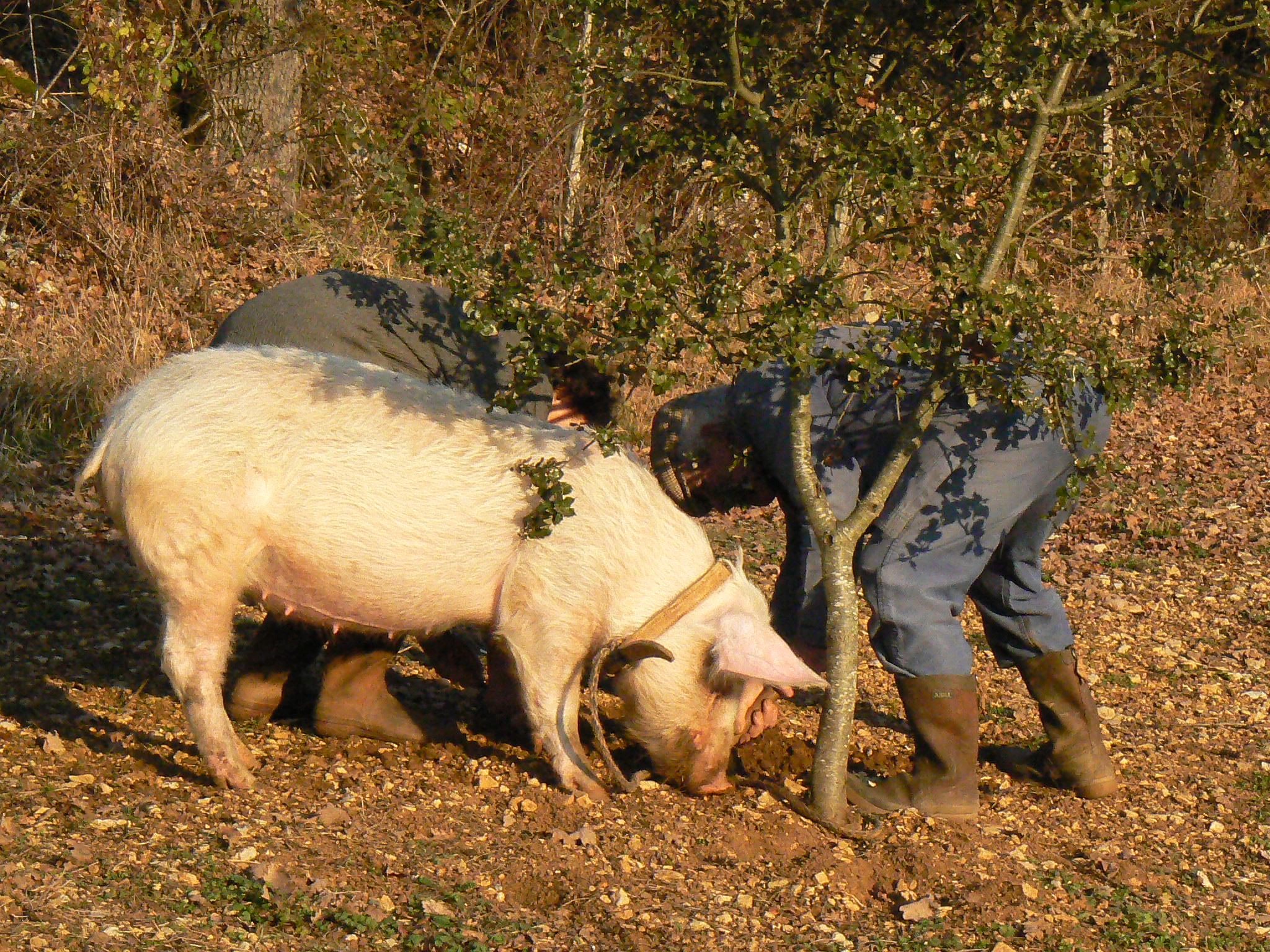
Trained pig in Gignac, Lot, France

A truffle pig or truffle hog is any domestic pig used for locating and extracting the fruit bodies of truffles from temperate forests in Europe and North America. Pigs have an exceptional sense of smell, and are able to identify truffle fungi as deep as 3 feet (91 cm) underground. Pigs have a natural affinity for rooting in the earth for food, and have sensitive noses capable of parsing even faint scents. They are trained to hunt truffles by walking on a leash through suitable groves with a keeper.

Truffle pigs have faced competition from dogs trained to hunt truffles. Dogs are lighter, easier to manage, maintain energy levels better, and have no motivation to eat the truffles themselves; they are only doing it to earn praise from their human handler. Since a truffle dog can be trained to merely point to the spot containing the truffle, the rooting can be left to the human, who can remove the truffle in a more precise and less destructive fashion than a pig's rooting. However, dogs require specialized training to learn to hunt truffles, while pigs are born essentially already able to find them, and their noses are somewhat less sensitive than a pig's. Use of truffle dogs goes back centuries. While they were originally a niche alternative, they have become more popular than pigs for the role, and truffle dogs are now the common choice since the late 20th century and onward.

== Training and use ==
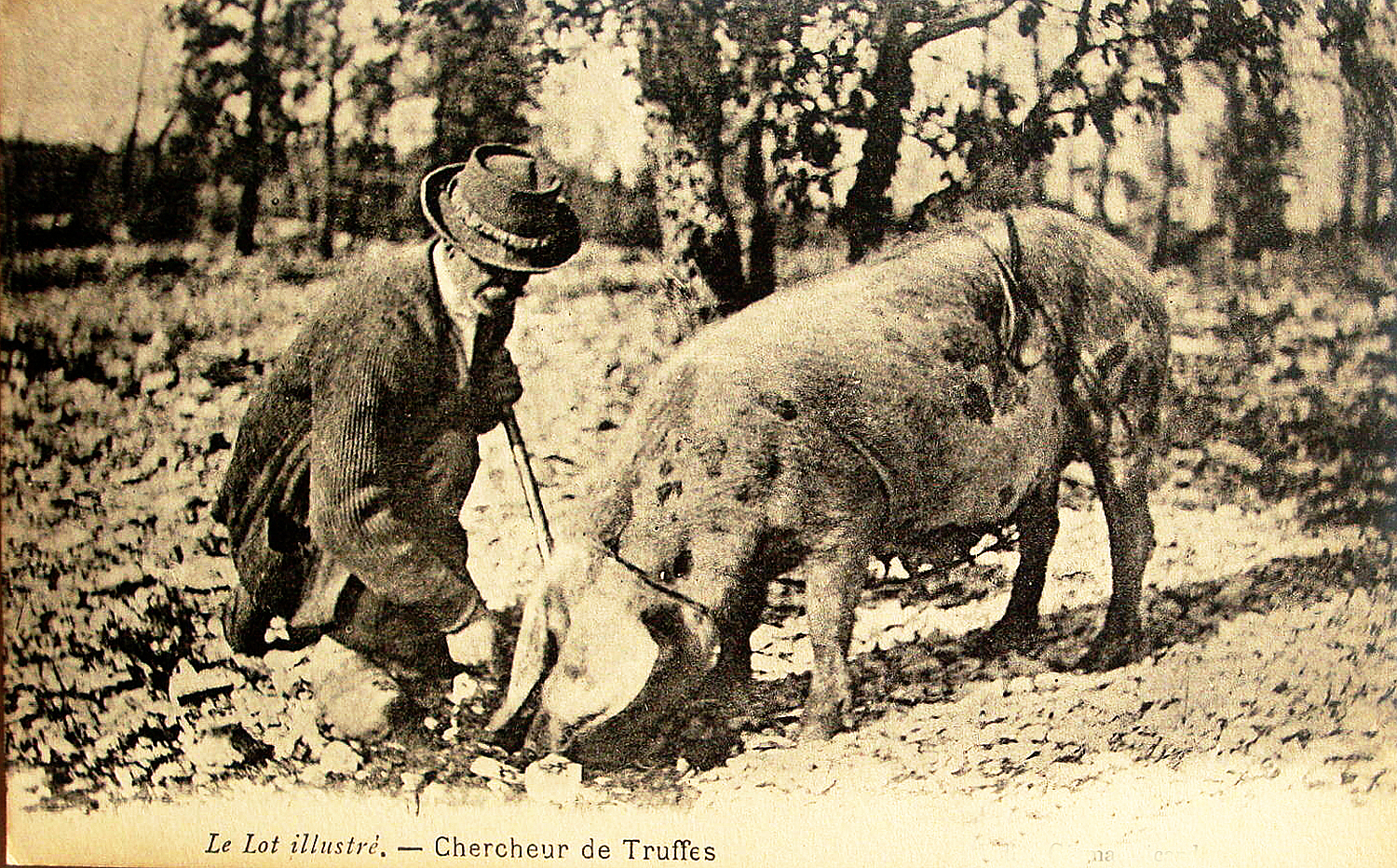
An early 1900s French postcard depicting a truffle pig in Lot

According to the traditional French system, a pig to be trained for use in finding truffles is trained around the age of three months. The training is quick, requiring just two or three weeks, and generally involving a sample truffle held in the trainer's hand. Trainers also need to train the pig to pivot quickly to a new delicacy; for example, after finding a truffle, the hunter will need to distract the pig with corn or some cooked potato so that it doesn't eat the truffle itself.

Sows (females) are traditionally used rather than boars (males). In theory, either could be used for the purpose, but sows are lighter, have a more tolerable odor, are less destructive, and are easier to manage than potentially aggressive boars. In older literature, it was thought that the natural sex hormone androstenol of the male pig, which is also found in truffles, was responsible for why sows wanted to sniff out truffles – they thought there was a boar nearby and were trying to reach it. This has been shown to be incorrect. Rather, it is the molecule dimethyl sulfide that is the signal creating pig interest; they are looking for a delicious meal when they root for a truffle due to the dimethyl sulfide scent. Replication experiments have shown pigs ignoring androstenol while eagerly attempting to eat inorganic objects coated with dimethyl sulfide.

The practice of pigs hunting truffles is most associated culturally with France, Italy, and Spain.

== History ==
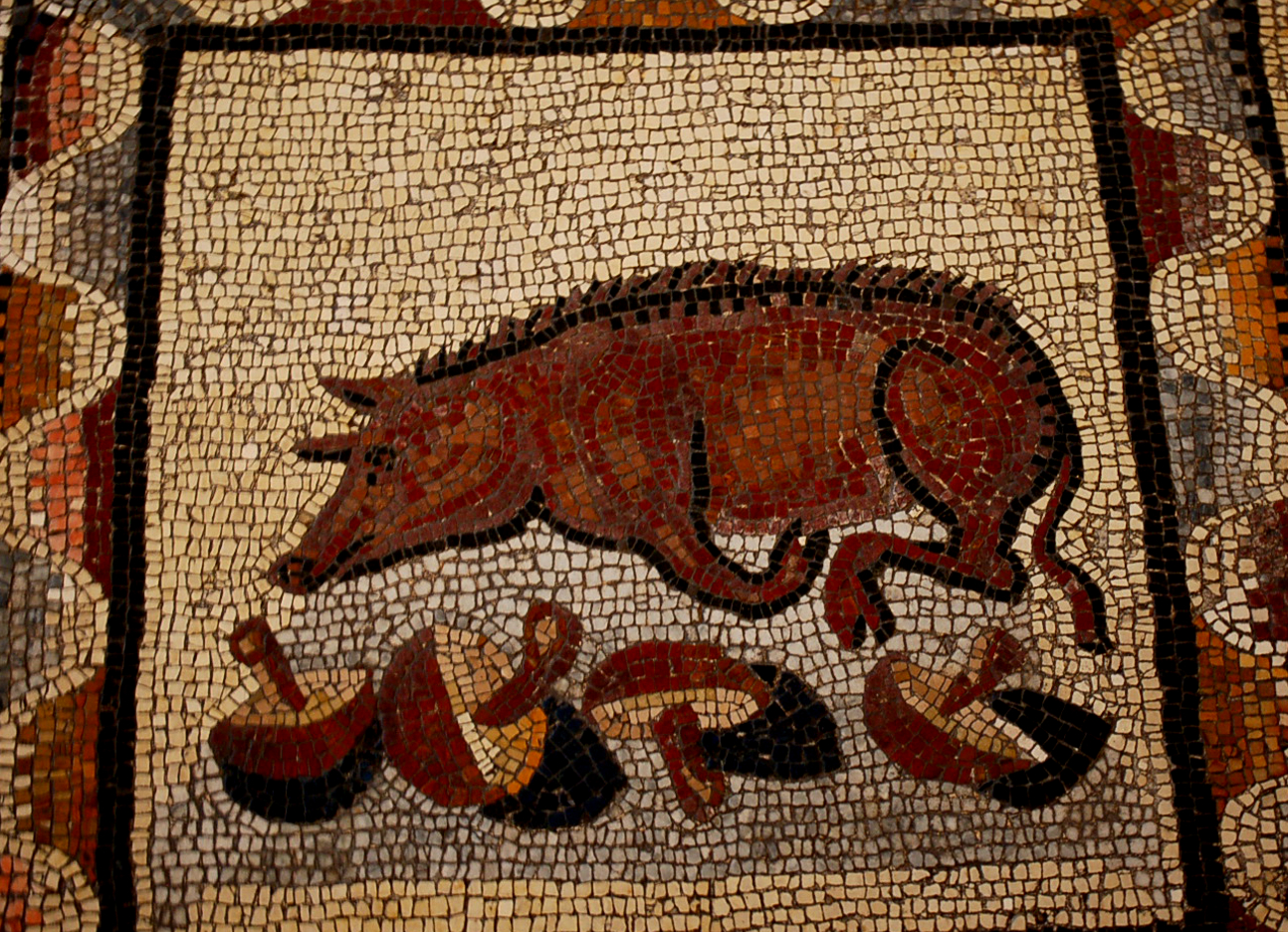
A Roman mosaic depicting a pig and mushrooms

The use of pigs to hunt truffles is said to date back to the Roman Empire, but the first well-documented use comes from the Italian Renaissance writer and gastronomist, Bartolomeo Platina, in the 15th century. Later references to truffle pigs include John Ray in the 17th century.

In 1875, a trained truffle pig could cost up to 200 francs, an immense sum in the era. A skilled truffler could more than make up for this investment from the high price of truffles on the gourmet food market.

In Italy, the use of pigs in truffle hunting has been prohibited since 1985, as the animals can cause damage to the mycelia of truffles while digging. This damage reduces the production and slows the recovery of the area, resulting in long-term fewer truffles being created.

== Truffle dogs ==
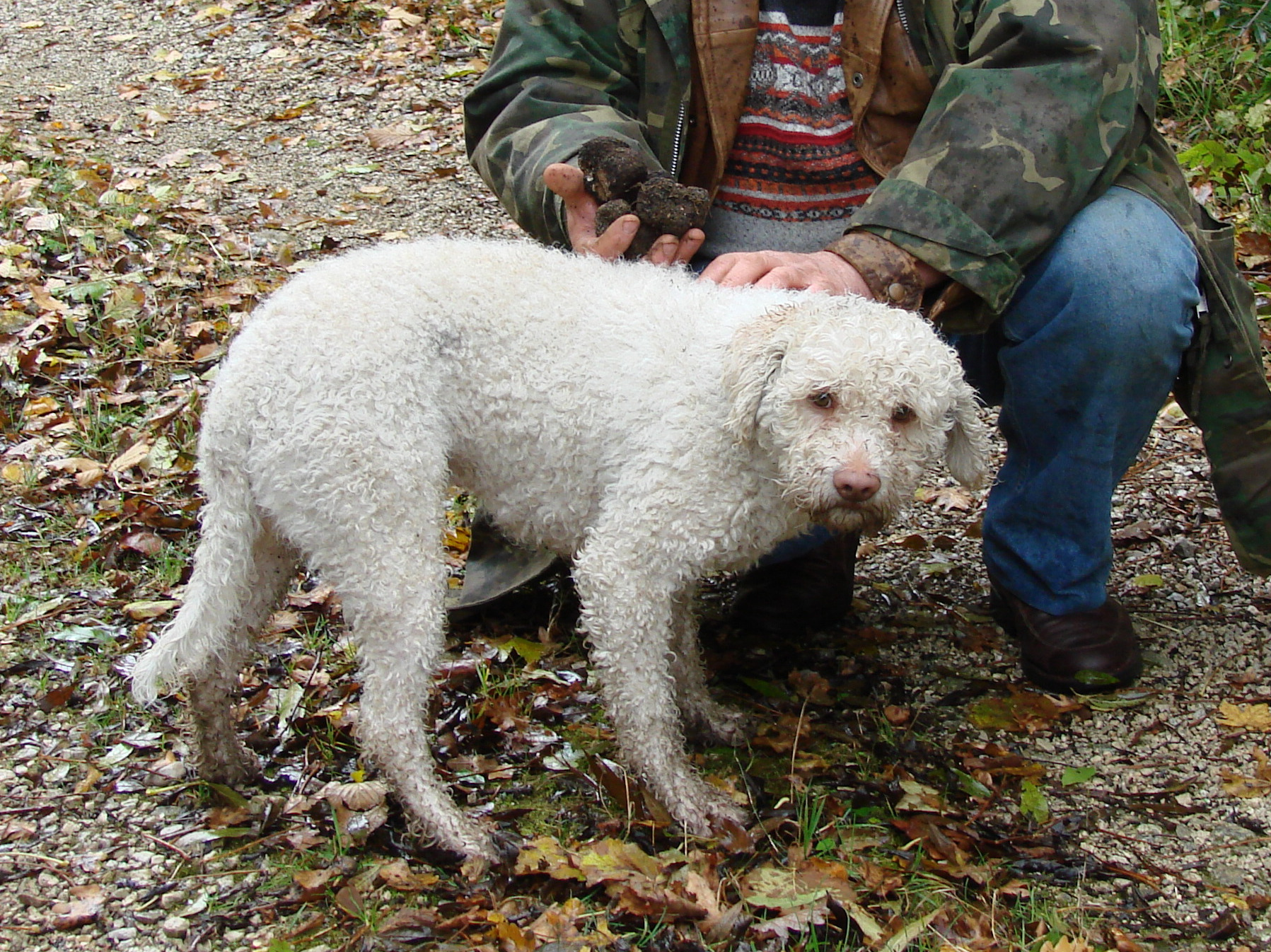
A Lagotto Romagnolo dog, with handler holding gathered truffles

Truffle dogs have arisen as an alternative truffle hunter, and outpaced pigs in popularity since the late 20th century up to the present. This is for a variety of reasons. Most notably, dogs have no appetite for truffles, while pigs love them. Pigs can damage or destroy truffles in the field by eating them, reducing truffle yield. In the worst case, a careless hunter's fingers can be injured or outright lost while trying to pull truffles out of the mouth of a hungry pig. They also tire more slowly than pigs, meaning they can be used in longer expeditions. Pigs are heavier than dogs, making dogs easier to transport. Use of dogs for this purpose is recorded since the beginning of the 18th century.

Unlike pigs, dogs have no natural affinity for truffles, and must be specially scent-trained to locate them. This training is longer and more intense than for pigs, making a trained dog a valuable and fragile resource. A trained Lagotto Romagnolo (an Italian dog breed recognized for its truffle-finding capability) can cost up to $10,000 (in 2021 USD). While the Lagotto Romagnolo is the most well-known breed for the purpose, the practice can be done with many breeds, including Labrador Retrievers, Dobermans, or even Chihuahuas.

A less savory reason for the use of dogs is their inconspicuousness for truffle poachers. Truffles are protected by law and require years to grow; a poacher can sneak on to property they don't own or have permission to be on, and scoop away immature truffles before they're ready to be harvested. Taking a pig on a walk through a forest is a giveaway as to the purpose of the expedition, while taking a dog on a walk attracts less notice and can be explained away more easily. The dogs can also be stolen, a common crime among rival hunters. More unscrupulously, some hunters have resorted to outright trying to kill their competition's dogs. Abruzzo was reported to be a particular site of strife between rival hunters, with "hundreds" of truffle dogs dying in Italy in 2023. Hunters were fearful of revealing their home address, as rivals who found it could throw poisoned meat into wherever they kept their dogs. Another tactic is to place poisoned meals or traps in certain forest regions that the poisoners know to have their own dogs avoid.

== In culture ==
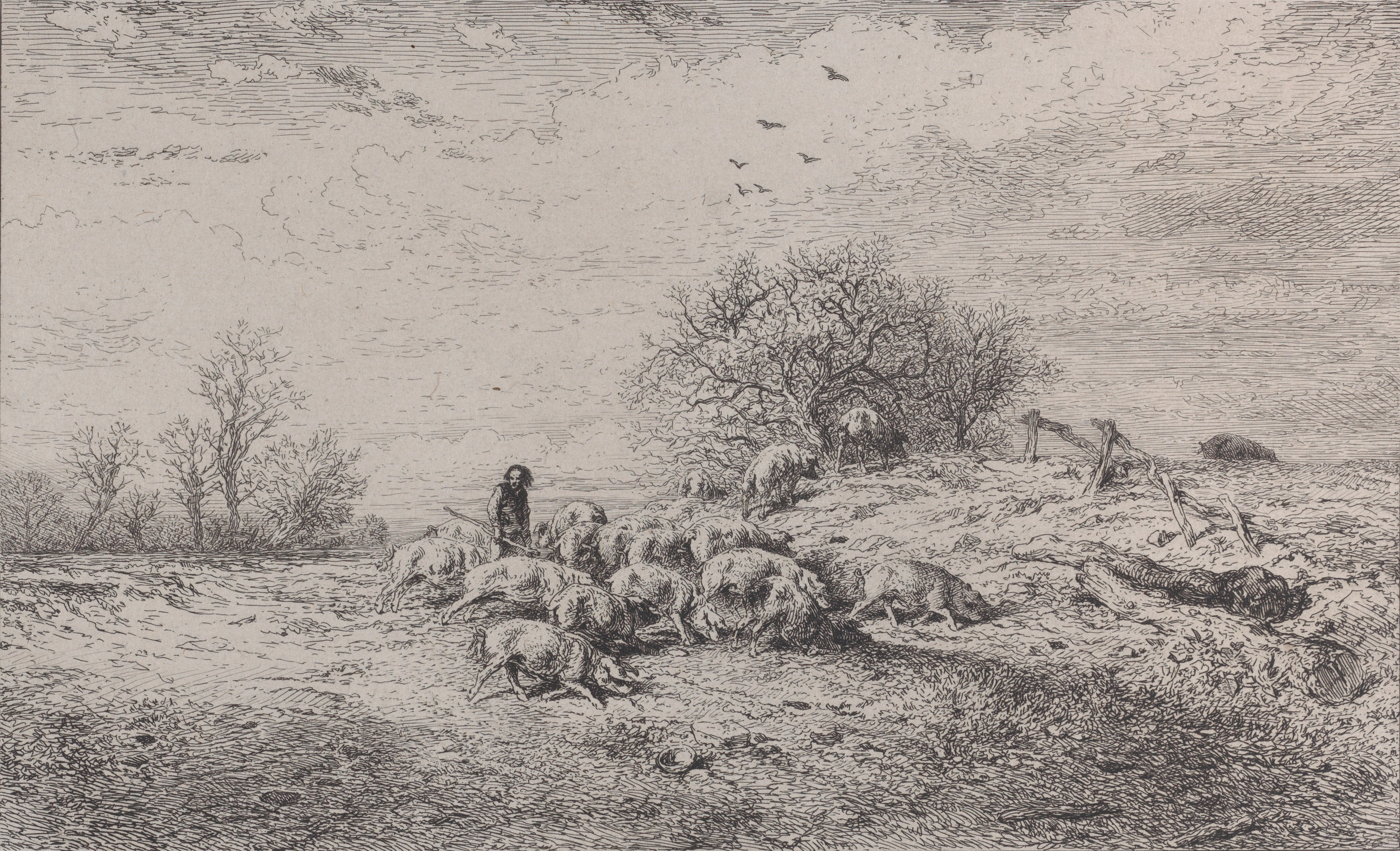
"The Truffle Hunter" (La truffière), an 1845 etching by Charles Jacque. Use of such a large number of pigs would be difficult for the hunter to monitor and collect the truffles before they were eaten.

Truffle hunting has been the subject of various media, both in fictional portrayals and in documentaries. The 2021 film Pig stars Nicolas Cage as a chef whose truffle-hunting pig has been stolen. The Truffle Hunters is a 2020 documentary on men hunting for white Alba truffles in Italy with their dogs. Trifole is a 2024 Italian film about the granddaughter of a truffle hunter going out to seek a legendary gigantic truffle with her grandfather's truffle dog. Australian author Inga Moore wrote The Truffle Hunter, a 1987 children's book with a sow protagonist who is initially incompetent at finding truffles.

== See also ==
- Fungiculture
- Scent hound
