= Just Jaeckin =

French film director (1940–2022)

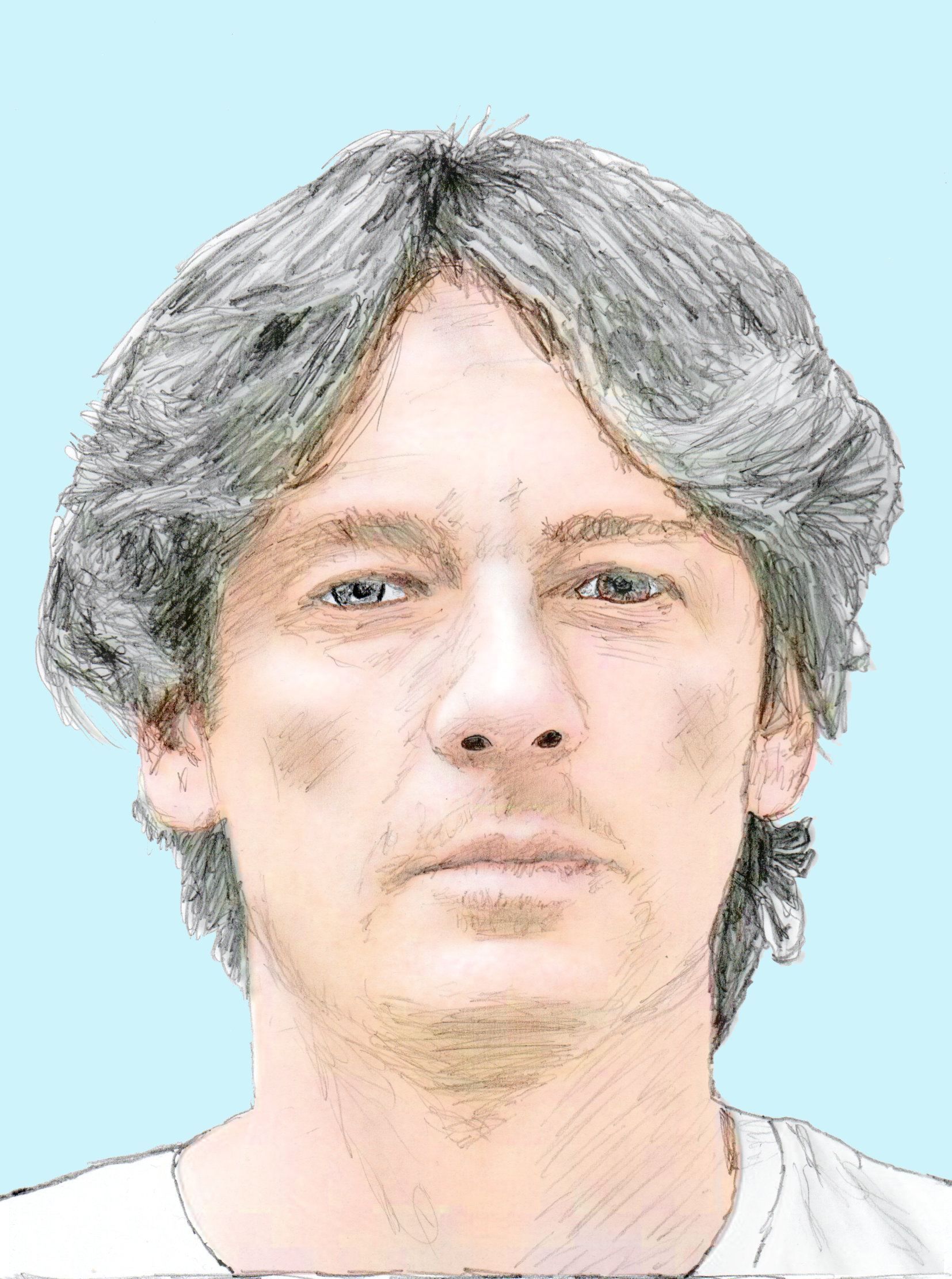
- Just Jaeckin in 1974 (pen portrait)
- Born: 8 August 1940; Vichy, French State
- Died: 6 September 2022 (aged 82); Saint-Malo, France
- Occupations: Director, producer, writer
- Known for: Director of Emmanuelle (1974)

Just Jaeckin (8 August 1940 – 6 September 2022) was a French film director, photographer and sculptor. He directed erotic films, starting with Emmanuelle in 1974, and continued making movies until he retired from film-making in the 1980s.

== Early life ==
Jaeckin was born in Vichy, Allier, French State during the Second World War, but left with his mother and father for England. Following the end of hostilities, he returned to France where he studied art and photography, before and after serving with the French Army: while with the army, he shot photographs as commissioned.

== Film career ==
Jaeckin debuted with Emmanuelle in 1974, starring Sylvia Kristel, a French softcore film which began a series. In 1975 he directed Histoire d'O (English title: Story of O), starring Corinne Cléry. The film met with far less acclaim than the 1954 novel on which it was based. It was banned in the United Kingdom by the British Board of Film Censors until February 2000.

A version of Lady Chatterley's Lover (1981) followed, featuring Kristel, Shane Briant, and Nicholas Clay. The film gained widespread publicity owing to its explicit nature, but received generally poor reviews and was only a moderate commercial success.

The Perils of Gwendoline in the Land of the Yik-Yak (original title Gwendoline) was released in 1984, starring Tawny Kitaen. The film is loosely based on the bondage-themed comics of John Willie and on the figure of Gwendoline. François Schuiten worked as a graphic designer for the film.

A 1986 article in the Los Angeles Times linked Jaeckin and actress Mary Louise Weller to "an upcoming French film." However, it never appeared.

== Personal life and death ==
Jaeckin later retired from film-making. He lived in France with his wife Anne and continued to practice photography and sculpture.

Jaeckin died from cancer in a hospital near his home in Saint-Malo on 6 September 2022.

== Filmography ==
=== As director ===
==== Theatrical releases ====
- Emmanuelle (1974)
- Story of O (Histoire d'O) (1975)
- The French Woman (Madame Claude) (1977)
- The Last Romantic Lover (Le Dernier Amant romantique) (1978)
- Private Collections (Collections privées) (1979)
- Girls (1980)
- Lady Chatterley's Lover (L'Amant de lady Chatterley) (1981)
- The Perils of Gwendoline in the Land of the Yik-Yak (Gwendoline) (1984)

==== Television releases ====
- Ça c’est Paris
- Salut champion, episode Formule 1 and Moto story (1981)

=== As writer ===
- The Last Romantic Lover (Le Dernier Amant romantique) (1978)
- Girls (1980)
- Lady Chatterley's Lover (L'Amant de lady Chatterley) (1981)
- The Perils of Gwendoline in the Land of the Yik-Yak (Gwendoline) (1984)
