= Private Lessons (1981 film) =

1981 film by Alan Myerson

- Theatrical release poster
- Directed by: Alan Myerson
- Written by: Dan Greenburg
- Based on: Philly; 1969 novel by Dan Greenburg
- Produced by: R. Ben Efraim
- Starring: Sylvia Kristel; Howard Hesseman; Eric Brown
- Cinematography: Jan de Bont
- Edited by: Fred A. Chulack
- Music by: Willie Nile
- Production company: Barry & Enright Productions
- Distributed by: Jensen Farley Pictures
- Release date: August 28, 1981 (United States)
- Running time: 87 minutes
- Country: United States
- Language: English
- Budget: $2.1 million
- Box office: $26.3 million or $12 million

Private Lessons is a 1981 American sex comedy film starring Sylvia Kristel, Howard Hesseman, Eric Brown, and Ed Begley Jr.

The screenplay was written by Dan Greenburg, who wrote the original source novel, Philly. Greenburg appears as the manager of a motel in the film.

Private Lessons was one of Kristel's few major American film appearances; she was better known to European audiences for her Emmanuelle films which had only limited distribution in the United States. In early 2006, a 25th anniversary DVD release was issued in North America.

== Plot ==
Philip "Philly" Fillmore is an adventurous 15-year-old boy and the son of a rich businessman in Phoenix, Arizona; when his father leaves town on an extended trip during summer break, the young man is left in the passing care of Nicole Mallow, a French housekeeper, and Lester Lewis, the family's chauffeur.

Philly is quickly infatuated with Nicole, and after spotting Philly peeping into her room, she invites him inside. To his utter shock, she starts undressing in front of him, but when a fully nude Nicole invites him to touch her, Philly panics and leaves. He shares the story with his best friend Sherman.

Next morning, Nicole invites Philly to visit her at night. After a game of tennis with Sherman, Philly searches for Nicole and finds her in his father's bathtub. She coaxes him into joining her in the tub and starts kissing him but when she tries to take off his swimming trunks, he insists she turn off the lights first. She agrees, but he once again panics when she touches him and rushes out. She apologizes, passionately kisses him good night, and invites him to sleep with her, to no avail. After flirting in a movie theater the following evening, they return home and kiss, prompting an awkward marriage proposal from Philly which she rejects.

After a day's hiatus, the two reconcile, go on a romantic date to a French restaurant, and return home to have sex. During intercourse, Nicole pretends to have a heart attack and die. Panicked, Philly asks Lester to help him hide evidence of his relationship with Nicole. Lester, aware Nicole is in the country illegally, is blackmailing Nicole and helps convince Philly she really died. The two bury a "body" in the mansion's garden, and when the "body" disappears, Philly finds a note demanding he steal $10,000 from his father or else his role in Nicole's "death" will be exposed.

When Nicole has second thoughts about their scheme, Lester threatens to expose her as a child molester. Having developed genuine feelings for Philly, she reveals the truth to him and they convince his tennis coach to pose as a police detective to intimidate Lester. Lester panics but is caught with the money before he can flee the country. Nicole and Philly return the money to the safe, but decide not to expose Lester's treachery. In turn, he reluctantly agrees not to expose Nicole's illegal alien status nor her acts of child molestation.

Nicole fears that Philly's father will eventually discover their affair so she decides to leave for other work. Philly forges a reference letter from his father stating she was "passionate" about her household duties, kept things well "in hand" and gave "everything she had" to her employer. Nicole and Philly make love one last time. When Philly returns to high school at summer's end, he arranges a date with Miss Phipps, one of his teachers.

== Cast ==
- Sylvia Kristel as Nicole Mallow
- Howard Hesseman as Lester Lewis
- Eric Brown as Philip "Philly" Fillmore
- Patrick Piccininni as Sherman
- Ed Begley Jr. as Jack Travis
- Pamela Bryant as Joyce
- Meridith Baer as Miss Phipps
- Ron Foster as Mr. Fillmore
- Peter Elbling as Waiter
- Dan Barrows as Green
- Dan Greenburg as Hotel Owner
- Marian Gibson as Florence
- Judy Helden as Miss Kristel's Double

== Music ==
Songs featured in the film include:

- Air Supply: "Lost In Love"
- Eric Clapton: "Next Time You See Her"
- John Cougar: "I Need a Lover"
- Rod Stewart: "Hot Legs", "Tonight's The Night" and "You're in My Heart"
- Willie Nile: "That's the Reason"
- Randy VanWarmer: "Just When I Needed You Most"
- Earth, Wind and Fire: "Fantasy"

The soundtrack was released in the US by MCA Records and in Europe by WEA Records.

== Production details ==
Dan Greenburg wrote the film's screenplay, which he adapted from his own 1969 novel Philly. Producer R. Ben Efraim would produce a number of additional Private... movies over the next decade, including 1983's Private School (which features a brief appearance by Kristel), and two in-name-only sequels to Private Lessons in 1993 and 1994.

During the bedroom striptease, Judy Helden performed as the body double for Kristel.

The film was financed primarily by Barry & Enright Productions, even though its two chief producers, Jack Barry and Dan Enright, were better known for their game shows on television, of which Barry was the host and Enright the primary producer. The company's announcer at the time, Jay Stewart, provided the narration for one of the movie trailers for the film.

The film was also the first picture for Jensen Farley Pictures (a subsidiary of Sunn Classic Pictures), a movie studio founded by Rayland Jensen (founder of Sunn Classic Pictures) and his fellow employee, Clair Farley. Sunn, initially a subsidiary of the Schick razor company, would be sold to Taft Broadcasting in 1980, shortly before this film's release. Jensen Farley Pictures was created after the sale to Taft, and one of the company's early releases was a film produced by Taft, The Boogens, initially planned for release through Sunn. Jensen Farley would later release another sex comedy whose selling point was the promise of a young man coupled with an alluring older woman, Homework with Joan Collins.

Director Alan Myerson and the cinematographer he hired, Jan de Bont, shot their principal photography for the film in Arizona and New Mexico over the course of 6 weeks during the summer of 1980.

In 1985, the film was remade in Italian as Il peccato di Lola (Lola's Sin) starring Donatella Damiani.

== See also ==
- The Graduate
- Private School
