= The Perils of Gwendoline in the Land of the Yik-Yak =

1984 film by Just Jaeckin

Gwendoline
- English-language theatrical release poster
- Directed by: Just Jaeckin
- Screenplay by: Just Jaeckin
- Based on: The Adventures of Sweet Gwendoline by John Willie
- Produced by: Jean-Claude Fleury
- Starring: Tawny Kitaen; Brent Huff; Zabou
- Cinematography: André Domage
- Edited by: Michèle Boëhm
- Music by: Pierre Bachelet
- Production companies: Parafrance Films; G.P.F.I.; Les Films de l'Alma
- Distributed by: Parafrance Films
- Release date: 8 February 1984
- Running time: 106 minutes
- Country: France
- Languages: English; French; Taiwanese Hokkien
- Box office: $1,337,274

The Perils of Gwendoline in the Land of the Yik-Yak (original title Gwendoline) is a 1984 French softcore action comedy film directed by Just Jaeckin, written by Jaeckin and John Willie and starring Tawny Kitaen and Brent Huff. The film is loosely based on the bondage-themed comics of Willie and on the character of Sweet Gwendoline. François Schuiten worked as a graphic designer for the film.

In the film, a mercenary rescues two kidnapped women. He is then hired as their guide in an expedition to obtain an elusive butterfly specimen.

== Plot ==
Captured by a trio of thieves at a Chinese port, Gwendoline, a courageous but naïve girl, is sold to a local casino-brothel owner, but after being rescued by Willard, a mercenary adventurer, she is reunited with her maid, Beth, after the latter's abduction by the same thieves who had earlier kidnapped Gwendoline.

Hired to transport an illegal cargo, Willard reluctantly agrees to take both women with him after Beth, withholding information vital to his livelihood, promises to divulge it only if he becomes their guide. Gwendoline, who has come to China to capture the butterfly that eluded her father, who had staked his professional reputation as a scientist on obtaining the insect, offers Willard $2,000 to take her and Beth with him to the land of the Yik-Yak, in which the butterfly may be found.

After escaping from the cannibal tribe of Kiops, the trio find the butterfly, but as she is about to capture it, Beth is captured and Gwendoline and Willard must enter an all-female tribe's underground lair to rescue the maid. The tribe is the vestige of the city of Pikaho, a primary diamond mining centre, which was swallowed by a volcanic eruption in the 12th century. Afterwards, the entire male population perished due to a disease spread by the eruption, and Pikaho turned into an all-women society considered nothing more than a legend. To ensure the survival of Pikaho, its Queen allows a victor among them to mate with any man who visits or is captured by the tribe. Aided by Beth and the Queen's henchman, D'Arcy, Gwendoline, disguised as a Pikaho warrior, wins this right.

While Gwendoline and Willard make love before the Queen, D'Arcy activates the volcano and he, the Queen, and the citizens of Pikaho are killed as Gwendoline, Beth and Willard escape. In the process, Willard is able to capture the elusive butterfly.

== Cast ==
The main cast

- Tawny Kitaen as Gwendoline
- Zabou Breitman as Beth
- Brent Huff as Willard
- Bernadette Lafont as the Queen
- Jean Rougerie as D'Arcy

The rest of the cast

- Roland Amstutz as Policeman Mr. Cattochet
- Stanley Kapoul as Kiop (Chief of the Native Tribe)
- Chen Chang Ching as Yuki's henchman
- Vernon Dobtcheff as Shirko
- André Julien as Tom
- Takashi Kawahara as Mao
- Kristopher Kum as Yuki
- Loi Lam Duc as Yuki's henchman
- Maurice Lamy as Yuki's henchman (Little man fighting with Willard)
- Jim Adhi Limas as Yuki's henchman
- Georges Lycan as Yuki's henchman
- Dominique Marcas as Translator
- Roger Paschy as Yuki's henchman (Muscle man fighting with Willard)
- Hua Quach as Yuki's henchman
- Just Jaeckin as Man in Sailor Hat Smoking Cigar (uncredited)
- Larry Silva as Taoto (uncredited)
- Annemieke Verdoorn as (?) (uncredited)
- Daniel Vérité as Chinese villagers (uncredited)
- Lionel Vitrant as Chinese villagers (uncredited)

== U.S. release ==
An 88-minute U.S. version was released on Vestron Video January 25,1985 (Catalog Number: VA5071) (Barcode: 02848515071)

Severin Films has re-released the 88-minute U.S. release of The Perils of Gwendoline in the Land of the Yik-Yak and has also released a 106-minute Gwendoline: Unrated Director's Cut based on the French release.
