= Strawberry Blonde (1980 film) =

- Italian: Bionda fragola
- Directed by: Mino Bellei
- Screenplay by: Mino Bellei; Alessandro Parenzo
- Starring: Mino Bellei; Umberto Orsini; Gianni Felici; Renato Scarpa; Annamaria Romoli
- Cinematography: Romano Albani
- Edited by: Sergio Montanari
- Music by: Daniele Patucchi
- Production companies: Vides Cinematografica; Hera Cinematografica
- Distributed by: Cineriz
- Release date: December 7, 1980
- Running time: 95 minutes
- Country: Italy
- Language: Italian

Strawberry Blonde (Italian: Bionda fragola is a 1980 Italian film directed by Mino Bellei. It is Bellei's only film as a director. The film is based on the stage play of the same name, which ran for four months at Teatro La Comunita. Mino Bellei and Gianni Felici, who had previously starred in the play, appear in the lead roles.

== Plot ==
Antonio and Domenico have been lovers for a long time. Antonio is an accountant, while Domenico is a pharmacist. Domenico makes more money that Antonio and has wealthy parents.

Meanwhile, Antonio has met Adriano Velluto, a model for a soap commercial, who is also in a relationship with Matilde, who is about to become a mother. Adriano moves in with them and Domenico patiently endures the "ménage a trois" and seemingly stays out of the way. But it's a clever maneuver that intensifies when Domenico disappears from Antonio and Adriano's lives.

In reality, Domenico has turned the tables and provided Adriano with an apartment, using Matilde as a pretext. Thus, Antonio resumes his usual routine with Domenico, and the pharmacist, not so secretly, has his backup friend within reach.

== Cast ==
- Mino Bellei as Domenico Condo
- Umberto Orsini as Antonio Maturo
- Gianni Felici as Adriano Velluto
- Renato Scarpa as the psychoanalyst
- Nanda Primavera as Domenico's mother
- Antonino Faà Di Bruno as Domenico's father
- Renzo Rinaldi
- Anna Maria Romoli as Matilde
- Piero Menciolini
- Roberto De Matteis
