= Tony Pritchard =

British actor

- Occupation: Actor
- Years active: 1993–2020

Tony Pritchard is a British actor. He made numerous appearances in British soap operas, notably in the BBC soaps Doctors as Stuart Pearce and EastEnders as Isaacs.

== Career ==
Pritchard appeared in the 2000 film Quills as Valcour. He also starred in the British short film A Girl and a Gun (2007), as well as making appearances on EastEnders as Isaacs, The Bill as David Ellis and he also played a minor role in Coronation Street as a businessman whom Liz McDonald (Beverley Callard) met in a bar. After various guest stints in the BBC soap opera Doctors, he portrayed the recurring role of Stuart Pearce, the father of Ruth Pearce (Selina Chilton), in 2009. 2014 then saw him take on the guest role of Tiny Alcock in the ITV1 soap Emmerdale. His character's storyline sees him have a brief relationship with Val Pollard (Charlie Hardwick). In 2019, he made his final appearance in Doctors as Clive Heath.

== Filmography ==
=== Film ===
Year	Title	Role	Notes
1998	Cash in Hand	Martin	
2000	Quills	Valcour	
2007	Bum Wrap	Businessman	Short film
2013	Red 2	Orderly #1	
2015	Burnt	Guard	
2018	Aux	Farmer Roberts	

=== Television ===
Year	Title	Role	Notes
1993	Screen One	2nd Heavy	Episode: "The Bullion Boys"
1993	Harry	Security Man	1 episode
1996	Neverwhere	Hammersmith	Episode: "Down Street"
1997	The Detectives	Tony	Episode: "Cardiac Arrest"
1997	Birds of a Feather	Man in Pub	Episode: "Three's Company"
1997	Bloomin' Marvellous	Bouncer	1 episode
1998	Real Women	DJ	Episode: "The Hitch"
1998	A Life for a Life	Campbell Malone	Television film
2000	The Sins	Ambulance Man	Episode: "Envy"
2001	Take Me	DS Anthony	Main role
2001	The Way We Live Now	Mr Wakeham	Recurring role
2001	My Family	Customer	Episode: "Breakable"
2003	Murphy's Law	McStravock	Episode: "Electric Bill"
2003	Doctors	Sergeant Silverton	Episode: "Black and Blue"
2003	Prime Suspect: The Last Witness	DAC Charles Evans	Guest role
2004	A Thing Called Love	Bob the Barman	Episode: "Turning Point"
2005	Heartbeat	Osborne	Episode: "Off the Rails"
2006	Dream Team	Brian Jenkins	Episode: "The Blame Game"
2007	Diamond Geezer	Sykes	Episode: "Old School Lies"
2007	Doctors	Andy Roberts	Episode: "Wedding Bells, Warning Bells"
2007	City Lights	Mickey Leaman / Francis Leaman	2 episodes
2008	True Heroes	Michael O'Leary	Episode: "Runaway Car"
2009	The Bill	David Ellis	2 episodes
2009	Doctors	Stuart Pearce	Recurring role
2009	EastEnders	Isaacs	Recurring role
2010	I Shouldn't Be Alive	Charlie Hence	Episode: "Trapped on a Ledge"
2011	Coronation Street	Businessman	Guest role
2011	Downton Abbey	Prison Officer	Episode: "Christmas at Downton Abbey"
2012	Secret State	Graham Gough	1 episode
2013	4 O'Clock Club	Errol	Episode: "Suspension"
2013	Prisoners Wives	Governor	Recurring role
2014	Doctors	Roger Stocks	Episode: "Perestroika"
2014	Emmerdale	Tiny Alcock	Recurring role
2015	Lady Chatterley's Lover	Field	Television film
2016	Jericho	Hawker	Main role
2016	Coronation Street	Gerald Dutton	Guest role
2017	The Rebel	Farmer	Episode: "Death"
2018	Knightfall	Ballard	Recurring role
2018	Doctors	Gary Stock	Episode: "Long Haul"
2019	Holby City	Nigel Dylan	Episode: "A Daring Adventure or Nothing at All"
2019	Doctors	Clive Heath	Episode: "Man Down"
2020	Two Weeks to Live	Carl	Main role
