= Private School (film) =

1983 film by Noel Black

- Theatrical release poster
- Directed by: Noel Black
- Written by: Dan Greenburg; Suzanne O'Malley
- Produced by: R. Ben Efraim; Don Enright
- Starring: Phoebe Cates; Betsy Russell; Matthew Modine; Michael Zorek; Ray Walston; Sylvia Kristel
- Cinematography: Walter Lassally
- Edited by: Fred A. Chulack
- Music by: Rick Springfield
- Production company: Unity Pictures Corporation
- Distributed by: Universal Pictures
- Release date: July 29, 1983
- Running time: 89 minutes
- Country: United States
- Language: English
- Budget: $3.5 million
- Box office: $14,049,540

Private School (also titled Private School ... for Girls) is a 1983 American teen sex comedy film, directed by Noel Black. Starring Phoebe Cates, Betsy Russell, and Matthew Modine, it follows a teenaged couple attempting to have sex for the first time, while their friends engage in sexually minded practical jokes.

== Plot ==
Christine "Chris" Ramsey lies in bed narrating a trashy romance novel to Betsy, her roommate at the Cherryvale Academy for Girls in Northern California. Meanwhile, three students of the nearby Freemount Academy for Men, including Jim Green and his overweight, slobbish friend Bubba Beauregard, sneak into Cherryvale to peek on the girls. Jordan Leigh-Jensen, showering at the time, sees that the boys are peering at her and enlists Chris and Betsy's help to drive them away; the three boys fall off the side of the building. In response to being disturbed, the roommates light a bag of horse manure on fire and put it in front of Jordan's door.

Later that night, at a co-ed dance, Chris reveals that Jim is her boyfriend; as the couple dance, Chris tells Jim that she has decided she wants to surrender her virginity to him. After a speech by headmistress Miss Dutchbok, the band plays a slow song while Jordan dances alone and conspires against Chris. Bubba, sporting an erection from slow dancing, sneaks off to the headmistress's office with Betsy to drink and have sex; however, the two are caught in the act by the headmistress and her friends. The following day, after morning aerobics and a sex education class, Chris books a hotel for Jim and herself.

After another period of time, students of the two schools are riding horses together. Jordan trots past where Chris and Jim are talking and flashes her breasts at Jim. In revenge, Betsy steals Jordan's shirt, forcing the latter to ride topless in front of the headmistress et alumni. That weekend, Jim goes to buy condoms but is confused by the pharmacist and ends up buying dental hygiene products; when Chris goes to buy the condoms herself, she is distracted and eventually seen by Miss Dutchbok.

After playing video games for a while in the arcade, Jim is embarrassed to talk romantically over the phone to Chris, while Jordan swears greater revenge. During the night, Betsy retaliates against Jordan and her roommate Rita by snipping the stitches of their cheerleading uniforms. The next day, Coach Whelan accidentally grabs Jordan's top and during a cheer routine Rita and the coach are embarrassed when they each expose a breast to the laughter of their classmates and the catcalls of the boys' football team. As punishment for the prank, an angered Miss Dutchbok confines Jordan, Rita, Betsy, and Chris to campus for a week. That night, Jim, Bubba, and another friend dress as women and sneak into the girl's dorm. Jim is caught by Jordan, who teases him with a cold bottle and forces him to give her a massage. Meanwhile, Bubba meets up with Betsy for a tryst, but he leaves to smoke a cigarette before they have sex. As Bubba is on the ledge outside of Betsy's bathroom, he peers into Jordan's dorm room where she is lying face down on the bed in her bra and panties with Jim massaging her back. Betsy looks for Bubba and catches him in the act of peeping, slamming the window shut in disgust. Bubba, awestruck when Jordan begins gyrating her bare bottom at Jim, falls off the ledge. Meanwhile, after Jim confesses to Jordan that he is in fact really a boy (which was already known to Jordan), she pretends to scream and kicks him out of the room, leading to Chris finding out about their indiscretion. Chris leaves the girl's sorority house, embarrassed and heartbroken.

After several days of unsuccessfully trying to get Chris back, Jim asks Chris's father for his help in the matter during parent visitation day. After he and Betsy tell Chris to take Jim back, she does. Meanwhile, Jordan's father has sex with her new stepmother while the chauffeur Chauncey listens in. Not long afterward, Miss Dutchbok, who has mistaken Chauncey for Mr. Leigh-Jensen (Jordan's father), has sex with him in the back of Leigh-Jensen's car. Bubba and Betsy, looking to have another tryst, climb into the front seat and turn on the loudspeakers, ensuring that the chauffeur and Ms. Dutchbok's indiscretion is known by everyone present at the program. Upon realizing what Bubba has done, Miss Dutchbok lunges at him, eventually resulting in the car rolling out of control down a hill and going into the pool. Chris and Jim then leave for their night of romance at the hotel. After failing to have sex that night because Chris finds the hotel too kitschy, as well as getting sick from the room-service food and champagne, they have sex on the beach in the morning. Meanwhile, Bubba begins hitting on Jordan, eventually leading to Jordan paying him a midnight visit; when Betsy catches them together, she is apoplectic. The final scene shows graduation day, where the graduating girls in the first-row moon the headmistress, Miss Dutchbok.

== Cast ==
- Phoebe Cates as Christine Ramsey
- Betsy Russell as Jordan Leigh-Jensen
- Matthew Modine as Jim Green
- Michael Zorek as Bubba Beauregard
- Fran Ryan as Miss Dutchbok
- Kathleen Wilhoite as Betsy Newhouse
- Ray Walston as Chauncey
- Sylvia Kristel as Ms. Regina Copoletta
- Jonathan Prince as Roy
- Kari Lizer as Rita
- Richard Stahl as Mr. Flugel
- Julie Payne as Coach Whelan
- Frank Aletter as Mr. Leigh-Jensen
- Frances Bay as Birdie Fallmouth
- Lynda Wiesmeier as Schoolgirl
- Martin Mull as Drug Store Clerk (uncredited)

== Production ==
Private School was initiated in the wake of the surprise success of Private Lessons in 1981. Universal, which had licensed home video and cable TV rights to the independently produced comedy, financed Private School as a follow-up project. Though not a direct sequel to the previous film, it retained multiple parties from it, including R. Ben Efraim as producer, Dan Greenburg as screenwriter (along with his then-wife Suzanne O'Malley), and star Sylvia Kristel, who played a cameo as a new character. Don Enright, the son of Private Lessons co-producer Dan Enright, was a co-producer on the film. Private School was directed by Noel Black, who had found success in 1968 with the thriller Pretty Poison. Phoebe Cates, star of the 1982 hit Fast Times at Ridgemont High, was cast in the lead role, while Betsy Russell was second-billed. Pop star Paula Abdul, then head choreographer for the Laker Girls, received her first film credit for choreography.

== Release and reception ==
Private School was released on July 29, 1983. Janet Maslin, writing for The New York Times, gave the film a negative review; she stated that the material seemed to indicate the makers' understanding of film business, as sex comedies "usually make money, no matter how sleazy or derivative they happen to be."

Roger Ebert with the Chicago Sun-Times gave the film two stars out of four, writing that the "smarmy-minded movie" was "much better than average" for teen-oriented sex comedies, but reflected a trend of "anti-woman" films in the genre. Jeremy Wheeler gave the film a mixed review for Rovi in the late 2000s, arguing that although most of the jokes "fell short," Private School was "good for a few shocks along the way."

An alternate version of the film aired on television, with many of the scenes replaced with less explicit scenes, and deleted scenes to make up for the lost run time.

The movie was thoroughly market tested all the way through the development, production and release process. Audience surveys were used to select the story, the tone, cast the leads and pick the advertising. The film was predicted to make $30 million and grossed $14 million.
