= Pierre Bachelet =

French singer-songwriter

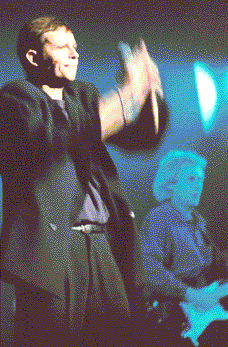
- Bachelet in 1990.

Background information
- Also known as: Andrew Bacson
- Born: Pierre Bachelet; 25 May 1944; Paris, France
- Died: 15 February 2005 (aged 60) Suresnes, France
- Genre: French pop
- Occupations: Singer, songwriter, composer
- Instruments: Vocals, guitar, piano
- Years active: 1972-2005

Pierre Bachelet (French: [pjɛʁ baʃlɛ]; 25 May 1944 – 15 February 2005) was a French singer-songwriter and film score composer.

== Personal life ==
Pierre Bachelet was born on 25 May 1944 in the 12th arrondissement of Paris. He was the child of Maurice and Alberte Bachelet. Bachelet spent part of his childhood in Calais and developed a lifelong appreciation of the North of France, which later inspired his hit song "Les corons" (1982). During his youth he learned to play the piano, but his fascination with Elvis Presley led him to learn the electric guitar. He started a band with his friends when he was young called The Volts.

Bachelet was married three times. His first son Yannick was born on 7 February 1964. After his first divorce, he married Danièle Bachelet. He had a second son Quentin, and his second marriage lasted 24 years. After that divorce, he married Françoise, the sister of Danièle, on 31 December 1998.

He died on 15 February 2005 at his home in Suresnes of lung cancer. He now rests in Marine Cemetery of Saint-Tropez.

== Career ==
In the 1970s, Bachelet had some international success under the name Resonance with the hit "OK Chicago".

His other hit songs include "Elle est d'ailleurs" (1980), "Écris-moi" (1982), "Marionnettiste" (1985), "En l'an 2001" (1985) and "Vingt ans" (1987). He also composed music for movies, including Emmanuelle (1974), Story of O (1975), Black and White in Color (1976), Coup de tête (1979), Les Bronzés font du ski (1979), the British-made Sex with the Stars (1980), and Gwendoline (1984). Robert Fripp won an out-of-court settlement over the use of music in Emmanuelle based on King Crimson's "Larks' Tongues in Aspic". His songs from the film Emmanuelle called "Emmanuelle in the Mirror" and "Theme from Emmanuelle" were sampled in the Lily Allen song "Littlest Things", released in December 2006. He also wrote the score of a few commercials and TV films.

He would return to score further Emmanuelle films, such as Emmanuelle 5 (1987) and Emmanuelle 7 (1992). He also did the score for the French film Un crime au paradis (2001), which was another success for him.

His signature tune, "Les corons", released in 1982, is notably used as the supporters' anthem for the football club RC Lens.

Bachelet bore a physical and voice resemblance to Jacques Brel, and had a similar onstage demeanor. Bachelet held Brel's work in high respect, and his last release while alive was a cover album of Brel songs.

In 2000, Bachelet was nominated for a Cesar Award for his musical score in The Children of the Marshland.

Bachelet wrote, composed and became artistic director for George Chakiris, who would sing songs such as "Mon pays c'est le soleil" (1979) and "La chanson de Bernardo" (1981). He also composed melodies for Véronique Jannot, notably the melody for "J'ai fait l'amour avec la mer" (1982) and "Si t'as pas compris" (1985). In 2004, he also composed three melodies for Patrizia Grilo including two previously unreleased songs and a cover of her hit "Elle est d'ailleurs" in the Italian version "Di un altro mondo".

Bachelet became an actor for the series Van Loc: un grand cop de Marseille broadcast on TF1 from 1992 to 1998. He appeared in the episode "For the Love of Marie" broadcast in January 1997 in which he played the role of a banker named Charleval.

He wrote the texts and took care of the staging of the spectacle of the transition to the year 2000 of the city of Marseille. This show consisted of playing skits for schoolchildren in Marseilles to recount the main events of the 20th century. Bachelet also intervened as "Monsieur Loyal" between the different scenes. His texts dealt with a man's choices, his doubts, his mistakes, his desire for love, and wars.

== Awards ==
=== Cesar Award ===
Year	Nominee / work	Award	Result	Ref.
2000	"The Children of the Marshland"	Best Music	Nominated	

== In modern culture ==
In 2015, a tribute album was released posthumously with various artists performing songs from Pierre Bachelet. The 13-track album was released on Smart label under the title Hommage à Pierre Bachelet: Nous l'avons tant aimé and includes interpretations by artists Quentin Bachelet, Marie Espinosa, Didier Barbelivien, Dave, Gérard Lenorman, Patrick Sébastien, Amaury Vassili, Gilbert Montagné, Philippe Lavil, Enrico Macias and Chico & the Gypsies. The album also contains two performances from Bachelet: "Les Corons" with Chorale des Mineurs Polonais de Douai and a remasterised version of "Flo" with Florence Arthaud. The album charted in France, Belgium and Switzerland.

== Discography ==
=== Albums ===
- 1975: L'Atlantique
- 1980: Elle est d'ailleurs
- 1982: Les Corons
- 1983: Découvrir l'Amérique
- 1985: Marionnettiste
- 1985: En l'an 2001
- 1987: Vingt ans
- 1989: Quelque part... c'est toujours ailleurs
- 1992: Les Lolas
- 1995: La ville ainsi soit-il
- 1998: Un homme simple
- 2001: Une autre lumière
- 2003: Tu ne nous quittes pas (Bachelet chante Brel)
- 2008: Essaye (posthumously)

=== Live albums ===
- 1983: Un soir... Une scène
- 1986: Olympia 86
- 1988: Tu es là au rendez-vous
- 1991: La Scène
- 2005: 30 ans

=== Compilation albums ===
- 2015: 10 ans de Bachelet pour toujours (posthumously)

=== Singles ===
- 1975: "L'Alantique (toi, moi et la musique)"
- 1980: "Elle est d'ailleurs"
- 1982: "Les Corons"
- 1982: "Écris-moi"
- 1982: "Souvenez-vous"
- 1983: "Quitte-moi"
- 1983: "Embrasse-la"
- 1983: "Mais l'aventure"
- 1985: "Marionnettiste"
- 1985: "En l'an 2001"
- 1985; "Elle ne sait faire que ah!"
- 1985: "Quand l'enfant viendra"
- 1987: "Vingt ans"
- 1987: "Partis avant d'avoir tout dit"
- 1987: "C'est pour elle"
- 1989: "L'Homme en blanc"
- 1989: "Pleure pas Boulou"
- 1989: "Flo"
- 1989: "Yé yé les tambours"
- 1989: "Le déversoir"
- 1992: "Les Lolas"
- 1992: "Elle est ma guerre, elle est ma femme"
- 1992: "Laissez chanter le français"
- 1995: "La ville ainsi soit-il"
- 1995: "Reconnais que tu pars"
- 1998: "Le voilier noir"
- 1998: "Un homme simple"
- 2001: "Une autre lumière"
- 2001: "Pour un monde bleu"
- 2001: "Sans toi"

=== Bibliography ===
Books about Pierre Bachelet

- Pierre Bachelet, En ce temps-là j'avais vingt ans..., Michel Lafon Éditions, 1989.
- Fanfan Bachelet; in collaboration with Évelyne Adam; Preface by Jean-Pierre Foucault, Pierre… mon amour, Pierre Robin Éditions, 2006.
- Jean-Pierre Lang, Quatorze ans de chanson pour Pierre Bachelet, Édition Hors commerce, 2008.
- Françoise Bachelet, Un p'tit bout de chemin avec Pierre Bachelet, Sony Music, 2015.

== See also ==
- A Crime in Paradise (2001)
