= Lady Chatterley's Lover (1981 film) =

1981 film by Just Jaeckin

- French theatrical release poster
- Directed by: Just Jaeckin
- Screenplay by: Christopher Wicking; Just Jaeckin
- Adaptation by: Marc Behm
- Based on: Lady Chatterley's Lover by D. H. Lawrence
- Produced by: Christopher Pearce; André Djaoui
- Starring: Sylvia Kristel; Nicholas Clay; Shane Briant; Ann Mitchell
- Cinematography: Robert Fraisse
- Edited by: Eunice Mountjoy
- Music by: Stanley Myers; Richard Harvey
- Distributed by: Cannon Films (United States); Columbia Pictures (International)
- Release dates: 29 June 1981 (France); December 1981 (United Kingdom); 21 January 1982 (West Germany)
- Running time: 104 minutes
- Countries: United Kingdom; France; West Germany
- Language: English
- Budget: $1.5–2 million (est.) or $3 million
- Box office: 1,134,750 admissions (France)

Lady Chatterley's Lover is a 1981 erotic romantic drama film directed by Just Jaeckin, based on D. H. Lawrence's 1928 novel of the same name. The film stars Sylvia Kristel and Nicholas Clay.

== Plot ==
After a Great War injury leaves her Baronet husband Sir Clifford Chatterley impotent and crippled, his new wife, Constance Chatterley (called Connie) is torn between love for her husband and her own sensual desires. With her husband's consent, even encouragement, even to the point of bearing him an heir, she is open to means of fulfilling her physical needs. She clandestinely observes their gamekeeper, Oliver Mellors, washing himself at his hut, and is immediately attracted, and uses that image to masturbate in bed that very evening. As she later approaches him at his hut openly, he shows disdain for her prying, due to class differences, he being a common laborer, and she a middling aristocrat.

During a later visit to his hut, ostensibly to view newly hatched birds, she sobs at their condition, and Mellors gently takes her in his arms, whereupon they begin a physical relationship. The physical affair between Connie and Mellors grows into love, and they both desire that she should have his child. Gradually, Sir Clifford begins to suspect the affair. After several more clandestine rendezvous, the lovers agree that Connie should spend an entire night at his cottage. It is on this night that Clifford painfully pulls himself to her upstairs bedroom, only to find an empty bed. When Connie returns to the mansion at daybreak, Sir Clifford awaits her. He is shocked and angry that his wife should descend to bedding a member of the lower classes. He sends his wife off to Venice, and fires Mellors. Connie, discovering that she is pregnant, attempts a return to Sir Clifford, only to be rebuffed, as no child of a commoner shall be an heir of his. She remains in the mansion, while Mellors awaits the finalization of a divorce from his first wife, who never appears in the film.

== Cast ==
- Sylvia Kristel as Lady Constance Chatterley
- Nicholas Clay as Oliver Mellors
- Shane Briant as Sir Clifford Chatterley
- Ann Mitchell as Ivy Bolton
- Elizabeth Spriggs as Lady Eva
- Pascale Rivault as Hilda
- Peter Bennett as the butler
- Anthony Head as Anton
- Frank Moorey as the priest
- Bessie Love as Flora
- John Tynan as Roberts
- Michael Huston as footman
- Fran Hunter as maid
- Ryan Michael as gigolo
- Mark Colleano as gigolo

== Production ==
At one stage, Ken Russell had considered filming the book, but lost the rights. When he heard who was making it he said, "unless the director has turned over a new leaf, Lady Chatterley's Lover is going to be a glossy facile romp in the woods, romp after romp after romp."

Star Kristel said she was ". . . sad that some people may feel the film was 'soft porn'. Just Jaeckin and I have been persecuted by this soft porn criticism. I don't want to go through the same nightmare as I did after Emmanuelle."

"We are not making an X-rated picture", said executive producer Yoram Globus. "This will be a cult film. Nudity depends on how you shoot it."

== Reception ==
In 1982 it was announced the film "Has recouped already."

According to another source Cannon Films ended up recording a loss. However, the film later became more popular in the home video market, as well as constant late night showings on premium cable channels such as Cinemax and Showtime in the mid to late 1980s.

== See also ==
- Lady Chatterley, 2006 film
- Lady Chatterley's Lover, 2015 film
