= Monique Gabrielle =

American model and actress

- Occupations: Model; actress
- Years active: 1982–2002

Monique Gabrielle is an American model and actress. Gabrielle was selected as the Penthouse Pet of the Month for December 1982, and has appeared in a variety of mainstream and adult films over her career.

== Early life ==
Gabrielle grew up in Denver, Colorado, and attended Denver Christian High School. After graduating from high school, Gabrielle moved to California with her parents.

== Career ==
Gabrielle was the Penthouse Pet of the Month for December 1982, and appeared in Bachelor Party (1984) and in Deathstalker 2 (1987). Since then, she has had an extensive career as a B movie actress.

Although she was in the 1986 adult film Bad Girls IV (credited as Luana Chass), she did not play an explicit part. Gabrielle was the protagonist of Emmanuelle 5 (1987). However, she did an explicit feature in 1998 called Ravished.

She had a string of minor role appearances in television shows and mainstream films that included Dream On and Hunter, as well as Night Shift (1982), Airplane II: The Sequel (1982), Flashdance (1983), Young Lady Chatterley II (1985), Weekend Warriors (1986), The Return of Swamp Thing (1989) and 976-Evil II (1992).

== Filmography ==
=== Film ===
Year	Title	Role	Notes
1982	Night Shift	Tessie	
1982	Airplane II: The Sequel	Schoolgirl	Uncredited
1983	Let's Do It!	Jogging Girl	Uncredited
1983	Black Venus	Ingrid	Uncredited
1983	Up 'n' Coming	Boat Girl #1	
1983	Flashdance	Stripper	Uncredited
1983	Chained Heat	Debbie	
1984	Hard to Hold	Wife #1	
1984	Bachelor Party	Tracey	
1984	Hot Moves	Babs	
1984	The Rosebud Beach Hotel	Liza	
1984	Over Exposed	Angela Quail	
1984	Love Scenes	Rick's "Partner" At Wrap Party	
1984	E. Nick: A Legend in His Own Mind	Charmaine	
1985	Screen Test	Roxanne	
1985	Young Lady Chatterley II	Eunice, The Maid	
1986	Weekend Warriors	Showgirl in Plane	
1986	The Big Bet	Fantasy Girl in Elevator	
1986	Bad Girls IV	Sandy	As Luana Chass
1987	Emmanuelle 5	Emmanuelle	
1987	Deathstalker II	Reena the Seer / Princess Evie	
1987	Amazon Women on the Moon	Taryn Steele	segment "Pethouse Video"
1988	Not of This Earth	Agnes	
1989	The Return of Swamp Thing	Miss Poinsettia	
1989	Cleo/Leo	Bimbo	Uncredited
1989	Transylvania Twist	Patricia "Patty"	
1989	Silk 2	Jenny "Silk" Sleighton	
1990	Hard to Die	Fifi Latour	As Carolet Girard
1991	Uncaged	Beautiful Hooker	
1991	Body Chemistry II: The Voice of a Stranger	Brunette in Flashback	
1991	Scream Queen Hot Tub Party	Herself	Video
1991	976-Evil II	Lawlor	
1992	Evil Toons	Megan	
1992	Munchie	Miss Laurel	
1992	Miracle Beach	Cindy Beatty	As Monique Gabriel
1993	Fear of a Black Hat	Girl in Music Video	Uncredited
1993	Angel Eyes	Angel	
1998	Ravished	Herself	Adult

=== Television ===
Year	Title	Role	Notes
1985–1987	Hunter	Police Woman / Library Patron	Episodes: "Not Just Another John Doe", "Guilty"
1988	Something Is Out There	Pretty Girl	Episode: "Good Psychics Are Hard to Come By"
1990	Hardball		Episode: "A Killer Date"
1990	Dream On	Scuba Lady	Episode: "555-HELL"
1994	USA Up All Night	Schoolgirl Monique / Monique - Slumber Party Guest	Episodes: "Parker Lewis Can't Lose Marathon", "Breakfast in Bed/The Marilyn Diaries"
1995	Problem Child 3: Junior in Love	The Blonde	Television film
