= Emmanuelle 7 =

- Theatrical poster
- French: Emmanuelle au 7ème ciel
- Directed by: Francis Leroi
- Written by: Jean-Marc Vasseur; Francis Leroi; Emmanuelle Arsan (character); Alain Siritzky (story idea)
- Produced by: Alain Siritzky; Ami Artzi (executive producer); Menahem Golan (executive producer); Nora Rim (supervising producer)
- Starring: Sylvia Kristel
- Cinematography: François About; Denis Rouden
- Edited by: Patrick Cosman; Bruno Zincone
- Music by: Pierre Bachelet
- Release date: 20 October 1993
- Running time: 90 minutes
- Country: France
- Language: French

Emmanuelle 7 (French: Emmanuelle au 7ème ciel) is a 1993 French softcore erotic movie directed by Francis Leroi, and starring Sylvia Kristel. It is a sequel to 1988's Emmanuelle 6 and the seventh installment in the film series of the same name.

It is the first film in the series to be filmed in French since 1977's Goodbye Emmanuelle. It was the last Emmanuelle film from the original series to be released in theaters with all future installments to be released as made-for-television films until the 2024 reboot. It was followed by a sequel, Emmanuelle Forever, released the same year.

== Casting and production ==
The screenplay was written by Francis Leroi and Jean-Marc Vasseur. The music score is by Pierre Bachelet. It was filmed in locations all over France and a fantasy scene in New York in late 1992 and early 1993.

This was Kristel's return to the title role after not appearing in both Emmanuelle 5 and Emmanuelle 6, but her return was not a happy one, due to financing her husband's failing film projects that drained her financially, she agreed to star in the film, but only in a non-sex role.

== Plot ==
Emmanuelle now runs a clinic and laboratory that uses the sexual memories and the usage of virtual reality computer simulations on its clients to help them achieve sexual ecstasy, or help them heal, depending on the subject. She helps an old girlfriend from school (Laurence) overcome her traumatic sexual history due to a nun splashing cold water on her during her first sexual experience in her teen years in a girl's locker room with a young Emmanuelle watching. She also takes on several other women and a few rich men, who go through the same type of "sexual therapy" to become better lovers in the real world – for a very heavy price.

To help her friend to overcome her trauma, Emmanuelle puts her into several simulations. In the first one, she could have her first sex without the nun splashing water; the second one, she could have sex with Emmanuelle with the dormitory girls watching them; at the third, she could get revenge on the man that raped her; and on the fourth, she walks naked at a male bathhouse among several naked men so she could seduce as many as possible until she could perform a sandwich sex. That helped her regain affection with men again. While the rest of the men watch her having an extreme orgasm with those men penetrating her simultaneously, a third man came along and gives her a passionate kiss, which gave her an much bigger and more powerful orgasm, but it was interrupted, making her fall in love with the man that wasn't penetrating her.

At the end of the film, the old friend is healed and is no longer repressed and as the wife of a powerful film executive. In the Cannes Film Festival, Sophie gives him a discreet oral sex, followed by full public sex on a podium stand in front of the world press, who applauded the couple once they climax.

(The film had one groundbreaking element to it in that computers were being employed to watch pornography and others' fantasies, and that in the future, this would become integral to the making of porn and erotic movies itself.)

== Release ==
The film was finally released on 20 October 1993 with a run time of only 90 minutes. In Germany it was released as "Digital Love". It made very little money, the critics panned it and was considered a flop. Kristel never was asked or considered doing another film in the series of any incarnation again.

This was the last of the original Emmanuelle series, as a new straight-to-video VHS (and later DVD) hardcore series started a year later with younger actors and newer (and much more adult) erotic plots with full sexual situations that had absolutely nothing to do with the original softcore stories.

== Cast ==
- Sylvia Kristel as Emmanuelle
  - Annie Bellac as Young Emmanuelle
- Caroline Laurence as Sophie
  - Cynthia Van Damme as Young Sophie
- Laura Dean as Marie
- Julie Jalabert as Melanie
- Roland Waden as Frantz Gotzerman
- Joel Bui as Atisan Khan
- Roberto Malone as Carlos
