= Sylvia Kristel =

Dutch actress and model (1952–2012)

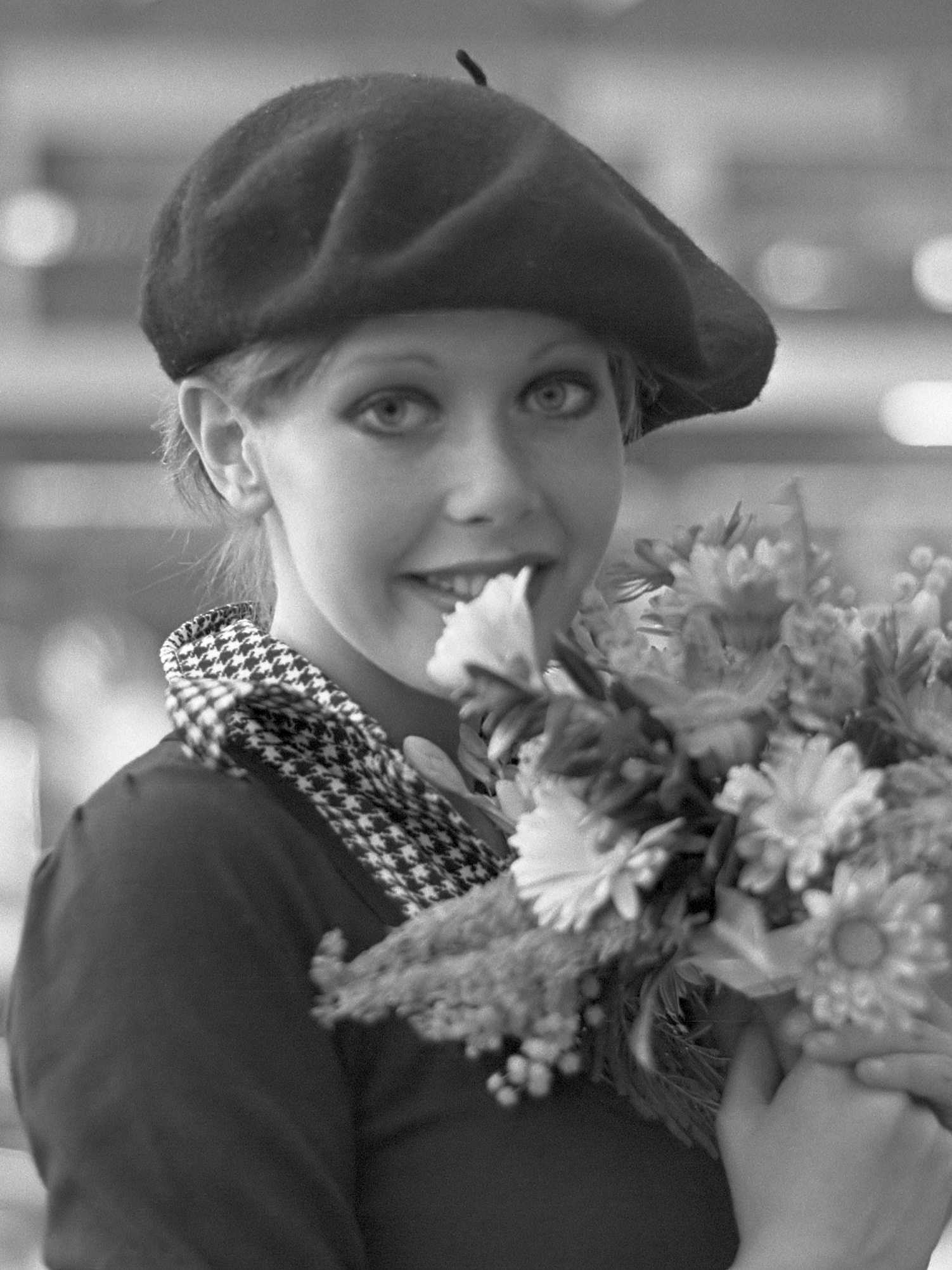
- Kristel in 1973
- Born: Sylvia Maria Kristel; 28 September 1952; Utrecht, Netherlands
- Died: 17 October 2012 (aged 60); The Hague, Netherlands
- Occupations: Actress; model; memoirist
- Years active: 1973–2010
- Known for: Emmanuelle; Emmanuelle 2 Emmanuelle 3 Private Lessons
- Spouse(s): Hugo Claus (1973–1977; div.); Alan Turner (1982–1982; div.); Philippe Blot (1986–1991; div.)
- Partner: Ian McShane (1977–1982)
- Children: 1

Sylvia Maria Kristel (28 September 1952 – 17 October 2012) was a Dutch actress and model who appeared in over 50 films. She was the eponymous character in five of the seven Emmanuelle films, including originating the role with Emmanuelle (1974).

== Early life ==
Kristel was born in Utrecht, the Netherlands; she was the elder daughter of an innkeeper, Jean-Nicholas Kristel, and his wife Pietje Hendrika Lamme. In her 2006 autobiography, Nue, she stated that she was sexually abused by an elderly hotel guest when she was nine years old, an experience she otherwise refused to discuss. Her parents divorced when she was 14 years old, after her father abandoned the family for another woman. "It was the saddest thing that ever happened to me," she said of the experience of her parents' separation.

== Career ==
Kristel began modeling when she was 17 years old. In 1971, before becoming famous, she took part in auditions for the female lead (a role ultimately played by Maria Schneider) in Bernardo Bertolucci's 1972 film Last Tango in Paris.

In January 1973, Kristel won a television contest called "Miss TV Europe", which was judged by Peter Wyngarde, Rolf Harris, and Katie Boyle. She was helped by speaking Dutch, English, German, and Italian fluently, and several other languages to a lesser extent.

Kristel gained international attention in 1974 for playing the title character in the softcore film Emmanuelle, which remains one of the most successful French films ever produced.

After the success of Emmanuelle, Kristel was often cast in films capitalizing on a similar sexually provocative image and in roles involving nudity. Notably, she starred in a 1981 film adaptation of Lady Chatterley's Lover; and in the title role of Mata Hari (1985), a biographical film about the World War I spy. She also appeared in lesser-known art house films by prominent French directors Claude Chabrol and Roger Vadim during the 1970s; and starred in La Marge (1976), a French box office success co-starring Joe Dallesandro and directed by Walerian Borowczyk.

Her typecast image as Emmanuelle would follow her into film roles in the United States. After her brief comic turn in the Get Smart revival film The Nude Bomb in 1980, Kristel starred in the sex comedy Private Lessons (1981) as Nicole Mallow, a maid who seduces a teenage boy. Although Private Lessons was one of the highest-grossing independent films of 1981 (ranking 28th in overall domestic box office receipts in the U.S.), Kristel reportedly saw none of the profits. She continued to appear in films and last played Emmanuelle in the early 1990s.

In addition to her early tryout for Last Tango, Kristel would often come close to having leading or supporting parts in several other major films over the first two decades of her career. She was cast as Stella in Roman Polanski's The Tenant (1976) but was replaced by Isabelle Adjani after one day of shooting. In 1977, she was an early choice to star as Hattie in Louis Malle's controversial period drama Pretty Baby (1978), but the role eventually went to Susan Sarandon. Several years later, Malle asked her to play Ingrid in Damage, his 1992 drama of sexual obsession, but Kristel was unavailable at the time and Miranda Richardson was cast. She was friends with Sergio Leone, who wanted her for the role of Carol while casting Once Upon a Time in America (1984); the producers did not agree and the part went to Tuesday Weld. In 1982, she was turned down by Tony Scott for the role of Miriam in The Hunger (1983); Catherine Deneuve won the part. She also was considered for the role of Lois Lane in Superman (1978), which went to Margot Kidder; and she unsuccessfully tried to win a role as a Bond Girl in four James Bond movies: The Spy Who Loved Me (1977), Moonraker (1979), For Your Eyes Only (1981) and Octopussy (1983).

Kristel also rejected the female leading roles in The Story of Adele H. (1975), King Kong (1976), Logan's Run (1976), Caligula (1979), Body Heat (1981), Blade Runner (1982), Scarface (1983), Dune (1984), Body Double (1984) and Blue Velvet (1986). In 1992, her friend Gérard Depardieu, wanting to help secure her comeback, unsuccessfully tried to persuade the producers of 1492: Conquest of Paradise to cast her as Queen Isabella I, ultimately played by Sigourney Weaver.

In May 1990, she appeared in the television series My Riviera, filmed at her home in Saint-Tropez and offering insights on her life and motivations in an interview with writer-director Michael Feeney Callan. In 2001, she had a small role in Forgive Me, Dutch filmmaker Cyrus Frisch's debut. In May 2006, Kristel received an award at the Tribeca Film Festival in New York, for directing the animated short film Topor and Me, written by Ruud Den Dryver. The award was presented by Gayle King.

After a hiatus of eight years, she appeared in the film Two Sunny Days (2010) and, that same year, in her last acting role, she played Eva de Leeuw in the Italian TV movie The Swing Girls.

In June 2021, it was announced that actress Sylvia Hoeks will play Sylvia Kristel in a biopic of her life and career.

== Personal life ==
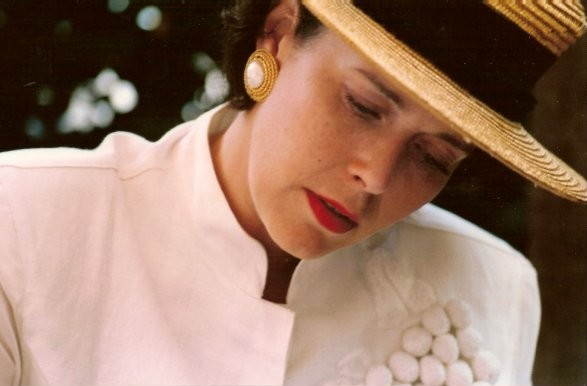
Kristel at the 1990 Cannes Film Festival

In September 2006, Kristel's autobiography Nue (Nude) was published in France. The writing was translated into English as Undressing Emmanuelle: A Memoir, by Fourth Estate, 2 July 2007, in which she described a turbulent personal life that was blighted by addictions to drugs and alcohol, and her quest for a father figure, which resulted in some destructive relationships with older men. The book received some positive reviews.

She had her first major relationship with Belgian author Hugo Claus, who was more than two decades her senior. Their union from 1973 to 1977 produced her only child, a son named Arthur, who was born in 1975. She left her husband for British actor Ian McShane, whom she had met in 1976 on the set of the film The Fifth Musketeer (1979). They moved in together in Los Angeles, where he had promised to help launch her American career. However, their five-year affair led to no significant career break for Kristel, but a relationship she describes in her autobiography as "awful – he was witty and charming, but we were too much alike." She began using cocaine about two years into their relationship. This proved her downfall, although at the time she thought of it as a "supervitamin, a very fashionable substance, without danger, but expensive, far more exciting than drowning in alcohol – a fuel necessary to stay in the swing." Sylvia Kristel also had a year-long relationship with French singer Michel Polnareff.

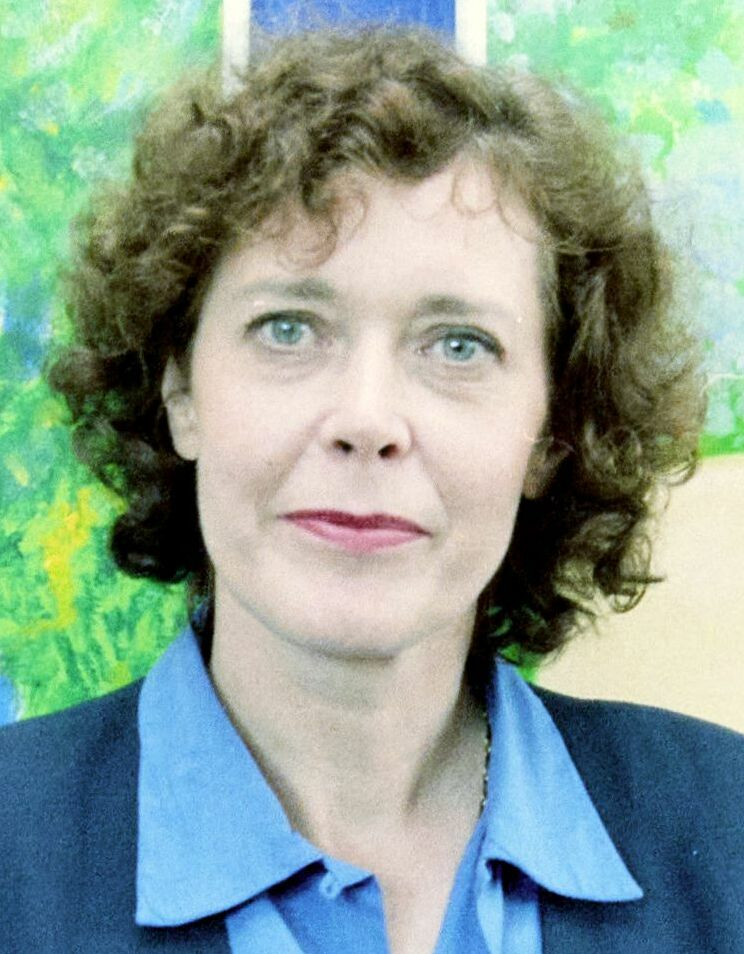
Kristel in 1998

Kristel was interviewed in 2006 for the documentary Hunting Emmanuelle. She described how she made a number of poor decisions due to an expensive cocaine addiction. One of those mistakes included selling her interest in Private Lessons to her agent for US$150,000; the film grossed more than US$26 million domestically. After McShane, she married twice, first in 1982 to Alan Turner, an American businessman. That marriage ended after five months, and she later married film producer Philippe Blot (1986–1991). She then spent a decade with Belgian radio producer Fred De Vree, until his death in 2004.

Her authorized biography was written by Dutch journalist Suzanne Rethans and was published in September 2019. It took Rethans more than three years to write it. Titled Begeerd en Verguisd (transl. Desired and Vilified), it has not yet been translated into English.

== Illness and death ==
Kristel was a heavy cigarette smoker from the age of 11. She was diagnosed with throat cancer in 2001, and underwent three courses of chemotherapy and surgery after the disease spread to her lungs. On 12 June 2012, she suffered a stroke and was hospitalized in critical condition. Four months later, she died in her sleep at age 60 from esophageal and lung cancer. Kristel is buried at her place of birth in Utrecht, the Netherlands.

== Filmography ==
=== Film ===
Year	Title	Role	Notes
1973	Frank en Eva	Sylvia	English title: Living Apart Together
1973	Because of the Cats	Hannie Troost	
1973	Naked Over the Fence	Lilly Marischka	
1974	Emmanuelle	Emmanuelle	
1974	Julia	Andrea	
1974	No Pockets in a Shroud	Avril	
1975	Playing with Fire	Diana Van Den Berg	
1975	Emmanuelle II	Emmanuelle	English title: Emmanuelle, The Joys of a Woman
1976	Game of Seduction	Mathilde Leroy	Directed by Roger Vadim
1976	La Marge	Diana	English titles: The Streetwalker / The Margin
1977	Alice or the Last Escapade	Alice Caroll	Directed by Claude Chabrol French title: Alice ou la dernière fugue
1977	Rene the Cane	Krista	
1977	Emmanuelle 3	Emmanuelle	English title: Goodbye Emmanuelle
1978	Pastorale 1943	Miep Algera	
1978	Mysteries	Dany Kielland	
1979	Tigers in Lipstick	The Lady on the Bed / The Unhappy Wife	
1979	The Fifth Musketeer	Maria Theresa	
1979	The Concorde... Airport '79	Isabelle	
1980	The Nude Bomb	Agent 34	
1980	Love in First Class	Beatrice	
1981	Private Lessons	Nicole Mallow	
1981	Lady Chatterley's Lover	Lady Constance Chatterley	
1983	Private School	Ms. Regina Copoletta	
1984	Emmanuelle 4	Sylvia / Emmanuelle	
1985	Mata Hari	Mata Hari	
1985	Red Heat	Sofia	
1985	The Big Bet	Michelle	
1988	The Arrogant	Julie	
1988	Dracula's Widow	Vanessa	
1989	Hot Blood	Sylvia	
1992	Silence of the Body(성애의침묵)		
1993	Beauty School	Sylvia	
1993	Emmanuelle 7	Emmanuelle	
1996	In the Shadow of the Sandcastle	Angel Kelley	
1997	Gaston's War	Miep Visser	
1999	Film 1	Patron	
1999	An Amsterdam Tale	Alma	
1999	Harry Rents a Room	Miss Pinky	Short
2000	Lijmen/Het Been	Jeanne	
2001	Vergeef me	Chiquita (on stage)	
2001	De vriendschap	Sylvia	
2001	Sexy Boys	La sexologue	
2002	Bank	Wife	Video
2010	Two Sunny Days	Angela	

=== Television ===
Year	Title	Role	Notes
1979	The Tonight Show Starring Johnny Carson	Self	Talk show guest appearance
1979	The Merv Griffin Show	Self	Talk show guest appearance
1981	The Million Dollar Face	Brett Devereaux	TV film
1981	Friday Night, Saturday Morning	Self	Talk show guest appearance
1982	The Don Lane Show	Self	Talk show guest appearance
1985	Àngel Casas Show	Self	Talk show guest appearance
1987	Casanova	Maddalena	TV film
1993	Emmanuelle	Old Emmanuelle	TV films
1996	De eenzame oorlog van Koos Tak	"Tante Heintje"	TV series
1996	Onderweg naar Morgen	Trix Odijk	TV series
1997	Die Sexfalle	Nicole Fuchs	TV film
2000	Mind Hunter (a.k.a. Die Unbesiegbaren)	Elisabeth Lohmann	TV film
2010	The Swing Girls	Eva de Leeuw	TV film
