= Emmanuelle 2 =

1975 French softcore erotica film by Francis Giacobetti

- Theatrical poster
- French: Emmanuelle: L'antivierge
- Directed by: Francis Giacobetti
- Written by: Bob Elia; Francis Giacobetti; Emmanuelle Arsan (novel)
- Produced by: Yves Rousset-Rouard; Alain Siritzky
- Starring: Sylvia Kristel
- Cinematography: Robert Fraisse
- Edited by: Janette Kronegger
- Music by: Francis Lai
- Distributed by: Parafrance Films
- Release date: 15 December 1975
- Running time: 83 minutes
- Country: France
- Language: French
- Box office: 2,249,707 admissions (France)

Emmanuelle 2 (French: Emmanuelle: L'antivierge, released as Emmanuelle, The Joys of a Woman in the US) is a 1975 French softcore erotica film directed by Francis Giacobetti and starring Sylvia Kristel. The screenplay was written by Bob Elia and Francis Giacobetti. It is a sequel to 1974's Emmanuelle, and the second installment in the film series of the same name. It loosely follows the plot of the original novel's sequel.

The music score is by Francis Lai. Playing the small role of a masseuse is actress Laura Gemser, who would go on to play "Black Emanuelle" in her own series of erotic films. It was followed by a sequel, Goodbye Emmanuelle, released in 1977.

== Plot ==
Emmanuelle is travelling by ship to join her husband, Jean, in Hong Kong. To her annoyance there are no cabins available and she has to sleep in an all-female dorm. During the night, she is awakened by the girl in the neighboring bunk, who tells her that she is afraid of sleeping in a room full of women because she was raped by three Filipino girls while at boarding school in Macao—she concludes by confessing that she enjoyed it. Emmanuelle recognizes this as an invitation and the two women have sex.

Arriving in Hong Kong, Emmanuelle is reunited with Jean and, after a couple of attempts, manages to have passionate reunion sex. Emmanuelle slips into the life of the Hong Kong expat community. She becomes friends with Anna Maria, the young daughter of Peter, one of Jean's friends. The two swap sexual confidences and Anna Maria is forced to admit that she is still a virgin. Emmanuelle schemes to remedy this.

Over the course of the film, Emmanuelle has a series of sexual encounters. She has sex with Anna Maria's dance teacher while viewing an erotic cartoon on a peep show machine, and with a tattooed man in the locker room of the polo club. She experiences vivid sexual fantasies during an acupuncture session, and also masquerades as a prostitute in the Jade Garden, a notorious Hong Kong brothel, where she has sex with a group of sailors (told in flashback to Jean). Together with Jean and Anna Maria she visits a bathhouse, where they have steamy, full body contact massages by a trio of Thai woman.

Emmanuelle, Jean, and Anna Maria take a trip to Bali. When Jean emerges from the shower that night he finds Emmanuelle and Anna Maria waiting for him on the bed. Emmanuelle undresses Anna Maria and makes love to her, before sitting back and smiling approvingly while Jean takes the young woman's virginity.

== Cast ==
- Sylvia Kristel as Emmanuelle
- Umberto Orsini as Jean
- Catherine Rivet as Anna-Maria
- Frédéric Lagache as Christopher
- Caroline Laurence as Ingrid
- Henry Czarniak as Igor
- Tom Clark as Peter
- Venantino Venantini as The Polo Player
- Laura Gemser as Masseuse
