= Mino Bellei =

Italian director and actor (1936–2022)

- Born: June 23, 1936; Savona, Italy
- Died: March 13, 2022 (aged 85); Savona, Italy
- Occupation(s): Actor, director
- Years active: 1961–2022

Mino Bellei (June 26, 1936 – March 13, 2022) was an Italian theatre and film actor and director.

== Career ==
Born in Savona in 1936, he graduated from the Accademia d'Arte Drammatica in 1959, and began as a stage actor in pièce by Pirandello, Molière and Shakespeare; critics counted him among the most promising and outstanding talents of these years. In the 1960s he also devoted himself to theater directing. His comedy "Life is not a film of Doris Day" was a great success.

Only occasionally he took roles in film and television. In 1979 he directed the film Bionda fragola (Strawberry blonde) from his own screenplay. Despite good reviews and financial success, it was his only film as director.

== Filmography (selection) ==
- 1965: The Mandrake, dir. Alberto Lattuada
- 1966: Francesco di Assisi, dir. Liliana Cavani
- 1978: Melodrammore, dir. Maurizio Costanzo
- 1980: Bionda fragola, dir. Mino Bellei
- 1988: Topo Galileo, dir. Francesco Laudadio
- 1989: Un uomo di razza, dir. Bruno Rosia
- 1999: Tea with Mussolini, dir. Franco Zeffirelli
- 2002: Pinocchio, dir. Roberto Benigni

== Theatre (selection) ==
- In the Jungle of Cities, of Bertolt Brecht, dir. Antonio Calenda, Rome, 1968.
- La vita non è un film di Doris Day, dir Mino Bellei, Rome, 1989.
