= Emmanuelle 4 =

1984 film by Francis Leroi

- Directed by: Francis Leroi; Iris Letans
- Screenplay by: Francis Leroi; Iris Letans
- Produced by: Alain Siritzky
- Starring: Sylvia Kristel; Mia Nygren
- Cinematography: Jean-Francis Gondre
- Edited by: Hélène Plemiannikov
- Music by: Michel Magne
- Production companies: Alain Siritzky Productions; Sara Films
- Distributed by: Cannon Films
- Release date: 15 February 1984 (France)
- Running time: 92 minutes
- Country: France
- Language: English
- Box office: 1.227 million admissions (France)

Emmanuelle 4 is 1984 English-language French film directed by Francis Leroi and Iris Letans. It is a sequel to 1977's Goodbye Emmanuelle, and the fourth installment in the film series of the same name. It is also the first film in the series to be filmed in English instead of French.

The film is also the last film credit for 1962 Academy Award and Golden Globe nominee Michel Magne, as the film-score composer committed suicide in a hotel room ten months after its release. It was followed by a sequel, Emmanuelle 5, released in 1987.

== Plot ==
Sylvia (Sylvia Kristel) is involved in a tormented love affair with Marc (Patrick Bauchau). She has tried to end their love, and escape, but always ends up back with him. After an encounter at a Los Angeles party, she decides she's had enough – she will go to Brazil and get extensive plastic surgery. This way he will never recognize her again, much less find her, and it will make for a great article which she promises to hand in to a California newspaper.

Sylvia goes through with it, and becomes a new woman named Emmanuelle (Mia Nygren); she is now a twenty-year-old virgin. She plans to take on all of Brazil in a series of sexual escapades that will purge her past.

== Cast ==
- Sylvia Kristel as Sylvia / Emmanuelle
- Mia Nygren (credited as Mia Rickfors) as Emmanuelle
- Patrick Bauchau as Marc
- Deborah Power as Donna
- Sophie Berger as Maria
- Marilyn Jess (credited as Dominique Troyes) as Nadine
- Christian Marquand as Dr. Santano
- Fabrice Luchini as Oswaldo
- Brinke Stevens as Dream Girl

== Release ==
Emmanuelle 4 was released in France on 15 February 1984. On its first week in Paris, the film sold 122,009 tickets. At the end of its theatrical run in Paris, it had sold a total of 455,882.

== Reception ==
In a contemporary review, John Pym of the Monthly Film Bulletin stated that "a reach-me-down mish-mash, padded with flashbacks and what appear to be hardcore sequences, and scissored by many hands." The review also commented on the 3D in the film, as "barely noticeable".
