= Lady Chatterley's Lover (2015 film) =

2015 British television film

- DVD cover
- Based on: Lady Chatterley's Lover by D. H. Lawrence
- Written by: Jed Mercurio
- Directed by: Jed Mercurio
- Starring: Holliday Grainger; Richard Madden; James Norton; Jodie Comer
- Country of origin: United Kingdom

Production
- Executive producer: Beryl Vertue
- Producer: Serena Cullen
- Running time: 90 minutes

Original release
- Network: BBC One
- Release: 6 September 2015

Lady Chatterley's Lover is a 2015 British historical romantic drama television film starring Holliday Grainger, Richard Madden and James Norton. It is an adaptation by Jed Mercurio of D. H. Lawrence's 1928 novel Lady Chatterley's Lover, and premiered on BBC One on 6 September 2015.

The adaptation is part of a series of four 20th-century literary adaptations by the BBC, including Laurie Lee's Cider With Rosie, L. P. Hartley's The Go-Between and J. B. Priestley's play An Inspector Calls.

== Synopsis ==
Lady Constance Chatterley (Holliday Grainger) enjoys a happy marriage to the dashing aristocrat Sir Clifford Chatterley (James Norton), until he is severely wounded serving in the First World War. Unable to walk and impotent, Clifford becomes more distant, and Constance finds comfort in the company of the estate's brooding, lonely gamekeeper, Oliver Mellors (Richard Madden). In the Britain of the 1920s, the social divide between the upper class and their servants was unbreakable: an affair between a lady and a working man would scandalise society and ostracise them both. Lady Chatterley must choose between propriety and love, while Mellors risks his safety, as they both strive to evade the growing suspicions of her jealous and vengeful husband.

== Cast ==
- Holliday Grainger as Lady Chatterley
- Richard Madden as Oliver Mellors
- James Norton as Sir Clifford Chatterley
- Jodie Comer as Ivy Bolton
- Edward Holcroft as Duncan Forbes
- Eve Ponsonby as Hilda Reid
- Howard Ward as Betts
- Elizabeth Rider as Mrs. Betts
- Tony Pritchard as Field
- Ian Peck asHarry Dale
- Enzo Cilenti as Victor Linley
- Sebastian Gray as Reverend Massey
- Chris Morrison as Ted Bolton
- Katy Kenyon as Bertha Coutts

== Critical reception ==
In UK newspaper The Guardian, Sam Wollaston wrote of the film's opening scene, "Hang on, what mining disaster at the start of Lady Chatterley's Lover, you might ask, as I did. It has admittedly been an awful long time since I read it, and then I was probably just skimming for smut (imagine if today's teens got their porn from D. H. Lawrence rather than the internet, they might think sex was something earthy and profound, rather than hairless and mechanical), but I don't remember any accident at a mine. It's not there, I looked. Well, it's hinted at – the husband of Mrs Bolton the nurse was killed down the pit many years before; she still longs for his touch and loathes the mine bosses she blames for his loss. But the accident itself plays no part in the novel". He noted that director Mercurio has "added bits here, borrowed there, taken plenty away. No doubt people will be cross. They shouldn't be: what works on 400 or so printed pages is different to what works in 90 minutes of television. […] The accident at the mine provides a dramatic opening and is powerful and exciting even on a small screen budget, as well as quickly getting to ideas of injustice and social conflict." Wollaston found the adaptation had simplified aspects of social class, before adding, "In other ways, though, Mercurio has made things more complex and interesting: like Sir Clifford Chatterley, not just a silly toff, but a man who had everything struggling to come to terms with becoming disabled. I felt a lot of sympathy for him." Overall, he concluded, "But I do think – in spite of the deviation and modernisation – that this is loyal to Lawrence, in its themes of class, the ridiculous social order of things, nature and physical love, and in its language and spirit. And if I'm wrong about that, then it still works as a damn good love story, moving and sad and captivatingly performed."

In The Independent, Amy Burns began by noting: "D. H. Lawrence's tale of Lady Chatterley and her groundskeeper lover is famous for many things – smutty language being perhaps highest on the list. It was thanks to this so-called 'obscene language' that the book was banned in the UK for more than 30 years. So how would the ever-sensible Beeb handle such dialogue? The answer, as it turned out during last night's 90-minute adaptation, was simple. It didn't." She went on to add, "And yet, this story of love – and lust – across the class divide lost nothing for losing the profanities". Burns found that, "Cleverly cast with the charismatic James Norton in the role of Sir Cliff, this version left the viewer struggling to choose with whom to sympathise. He appeared kind and caring towards his wife and rather than simply wanting to whore her out, Sir Cliff made it clear 'it is the living together day to day not the sleeping together once or twice' that makes a marriage. And Lady C – played in excellent haughty fashion by Holliday Grainger – was deliciously dislikeable." She was less impressed with Richard Madden's attempts to capture Mellors' accent, writing that he "couldn't get it quite 'reight' – and phrases such as 'you have the nicest tail of any lass' were laugh-out-loud funny rather than romantic or raunchy"; but concluded, "Still, he gev it 'is best shot and thou can't say owt fairer than that."

== See also ==
- Lady Chatterley's Lover (1981)
- Lady Chatterley's Lover (2022)
