= Trifole =

2024 Italian film

- Theatrical release poster
- Directed by: Gabriele Fabbro
- Screenplay by: Gabriele Fabbro, Ydalie Turk
- Produced by: Massimo Fabbro; Casey Diepeveen; Mattia Puleo; John Humber
- Starring: Ydalie Turk; Umberto Orsini; Margherita Buy; Enzo Iacchetti
- Music by: Alberto Mandarini
- Release dates: October 17, 2024 (Italy); November 14, 2025 (Quad Cinema, United States)
- Running time: 101 minutes
- Country: Italy
- Languages: Italian, English
- Budget: US$1.6 million
- Box office: US$77,153

Trifole is a 2024 Italian film by Gabriele Fabbro based on the production team's research around Alba, Piedmont where the rare white truffle grows.

== Premise ==
To prevent her grandfather, an Italian truffle hunter in failing health, from being evicted, Dalia, a modern yet lost young woman, goes on a quest to hunt the biggest truffle ever found.

== Production ==
The film was produced by TrifoleMovie in association with Cinefonie and is distributed in Italy by Officine UBU.

The work was created with the contribution of the PR FESR Piemonte 2021-2027 - "Piemonte Film TV Fund" call and with the support of the Film Commission Torino Piemonte. It is the second feature film by Gabriele Fabbro. It was shot in Italy’s Piedmont region on a budget of €1.4 million (US$1.6 million). It is inspired by the director’s passion for white truffle and its connection with terroir and tradition. Principal photography ran for four weeks in November and December 2023.

== Music ==
The score comprises classical works by Ottorino Respighi, Sergei Rachmaninoff and Gioacchino Rossini, among others.

== Release ==
The film has been screened at the Palm Springs International Film Festival, Santa Barbara International Film Festival, Miami Film Festival, Sonoma International Film Festival and Phoenix Film Festival, which then led to Cohen Media Group acquiring U.S. distribution rights, after having also done so for Io capitano.

== Reception ==
RogerEbert.com's Sheila O'Malley gave 3 out of 4 stars, and explained the movie takes place in the same region as The Truffle Hunters.
