= Emmanuelle 6 =

- Original film poster
- Directed by: Bruno Zincone; Jean Rollin (uncredited)
- Written by: Jean Rollin; Emmanuelle Arsan (novel)
- Produced by: Roger Corman; Alain Siritzky; George Korda (associate producer)
- Starring: Natalie Uher
- Cinematography: Serge Godet; Max Monteillet
- Edited by: Michel Crivellaro
- Music by: Olivier Day
- Release date: July 6, 1988
- Running time: 80 minutes
- Country: France
- Language: English

Emmanuelle 6 is a 1988 English-language French softcore erotica movie directed by Bruno Zincone, and starred Austrian actress Natalie Uher. The screenplay was written by cult erotic horror specialist Jean Rollin. It is a sequel to 1987's Emmanuelle 5 and the sixth installment in the film series of the same name.

== Production ==
The filming location was Venezuela. Although hardcore scenes were filmed to make this remake of the original 1974 version more edgy, they were not used in any known available cuts except for the French VHS version, which is 10 minutes longer. Until the release of the 2024 reboot, it was the last film in the series to be filmed in English, with the series going back to film in French starting with the following entries. It was followed by a sequel, Emmanuelle 7, released in 1993.

== Release ==
It was released in July 1988 in France, but due to its dwindling popularity (despite the name) and the rise of more conventional hard-core pornography available for home viewing, the film made very little money and was never released worldwide except briefly in Spain and Germany.

== Cast ==
- Natalie Uher as Emmanuelle
- Jean-René Gossart as Professor Simon
- Thomas Obermuller as Benton
- Gustavo Rodriguez as Tony Harrison
- Haydée Balza as Rita
- Hassan Guerrar as Carlos
- Luis Carlos Mendes as Morales
- Tamira as Uma
