= Goodbye Emmanuelle =

1977 French softcore erotica film by François Leterrier

- Theatrical poster
- Directed by: François Leterrier
- Written by: Monique Lange; François Leterrier; Emmanuelle Arsan (character)
- Produced by: Yves Rousset-Rouard
- Starring: Sylvia Kristel
- Cinematography: Jean Badal
- Edited by: Marie-Josèphe Yoyotte
- Music by: Serge Gainsbourg
- Distributed by: Parafrance Films; Warner-Columbia Film
- Release date: December 15, 1977 (USA)
- Running time: 100 minutes
- Country: France
- Language: French
- Box office: 990,953 admissions (France)

Goodbye Emmanuelle is a 1977 French softcore erotica movie directed by François Leterrier, and starring Sylvia Kristel. It is a sequel to 1975's Emmanuelle 2, and the third installment in the film series of the same name.

The music score is by Serge Gainsbourg. In this sequel, Emmanuelle and Jean move to the Seychelles, where she leaves him. Until the release of Emmanuelle 7 in 1992, it was the last film in the series to be filmed in French, with the following entries being filmed in English. It was followed by a sequel, Emmanuelle 4, released in 1984.

== Premise ==
Emmanuelle and her architect husband Jean continue their amoral lifestyle in the Seychelles. But when a casual dalliance between her and Gregory, a film director, starts to turn serious her husband shows very traditional signs of jealousy.

== Cast ==
- Sylvia Kristel as Emmanuelle
- Umberto Orsini as Jean
- Alexandra Stewart as Dorothée
- Olga Georges-Picot as Florence
- Jean-Pierre Bouvier as Grégory
- Sylvie Fennec as Clara
- Caroline Laurence as Cécile
- Jacques Doniol-Valcroze as Michel Cordier
- Charlotte Alexandra as Chloe

== Production ==
Goodbye Emmanuelle was intended as the last of a trilogy that included Emmanuelle (1974) and Emmanuelle 2 (1975). It was shot on the Seychellois island of La Digue.

== Release ==
The film was originally released in France in 1977 through Parafrance and Warner-Columbia Film. In the early 1980s, it became the first movie to be released through Miramax Films, a U.S. independent distributor. The company's founders, Bob and Harvey Weinstein, acquired the rights from producer Yves Rousset-Rouard at the Cannes Film Festival. Several years later, the film became a late-night offering on the Cinemax and Showtime cable channels.

== Reception ==
In The New York Times review, critic John Corry observed that "The scenery [in Goodbye Emmanuelle] wins every time", but was less favorable about what he deemed "wearisome" sex scenes. Corry reflected on both aspects in his critique: "The question in the movie is whether Francois Leterrier, its director, was so absorbed in the lovemaking that he just allowed the scenery to creep in, or whether he put it in on purpose. Maybe it doesn't matter."
