= List of French films of 1981 =

A list of films produced in France in 1981.

French films released in 1981
Title	Director	Cast	Genre	Notes
The Aviator's Wife	Éric Rohmer	Philippe Marlaud, Marie Rivière, Anne-Laure Meury	Comedy-drama	
Beau-père	Bertrand Blier	Patrick Dewaere, Ariel Besse, Maurice Ronet	Comedy-drama, romance	
Birgitt Haas Must Be Killed	Laurent Heynemann	Philippe Noiret, Jean Rochefort, Lisa Kreuzer	Thriller	Co-production with West Germany
Coup de Torchon	Bertrand Tavernier	Philippe Noiret, Isabelle Huppert, Jean-Pierre Marielle	Crime, comedy	
Diva	Jean-Jacques Beineix	Frédéric Andréi, Wilhelmenia Wiggins Fernandez, Richard Bohringer	Thriller	
Docteur Jekyll et les femmes	Walerian Borowczyk	Udo Kier, Marina Pierro, Howard Vernon	Horror	
Fruits of Passion	Shuji Terayama	Klaus Kinski, Isabelle Illiers, Arielle Dombasle	Adult	French-Japanese co-production
Garde à vue	Claude Miller	Romy Schneider, Michel Serrault, Lino Ventura	Thriller	
La Chèvre	Francis Veber	Pierre Richard, Gérard Depardieu, Corynne Charbit	Comedy	
La provinciale	Claude Goretta	Bruno Ganz, Patrick Chesnais, Dominique Paturel		
La Soupe aux choux	Jean Girault	Jean Carmet, Jacques Villeret, Christine Dejoux	Comedy	
Lady Chatterley's Lover	Just Jaeckin	Sylvia Kristel, Shane Briant, Nicholas Clay	Drama	French-British co-production
Le Choix des armes	Alain Corneau	Yves Montand, Gérard Depardieu, Catherine Deneuve	Crime	
Le Pont du Nord	Jacques Rivette	Bulle Ogier, Pascale Ogier, Pierre Clémenti	Avant-garde	
Le Professionnel	Georges Lautner	Jean-Paul Belmondo, Michel Beaune, Cyrielle Claire	Thriller	
Les Uns et les Autres	Claude Lelouch	Robert Hossein, Nicole Garcia, Geraldine Chaplin	Epic	
Murder Obsession	Riccardo Freda	Stefano Patrizi, Martine Brochard, Henri Garcin	Horror	Italian-French co-production
Neige	Juliet Berto	Juliet Berto, Jean-François Stévenin, Robert Liensol		
Possession	Andrzej Żuławski	Isabelle Adjani, Sam Neill, Heinz Bennent	Avant-garde	French-West German co-production
Pourquoi pas nous?	Michel Berny	Aldo Maccione, Dominique Lavanant	Comedy	
The Prodigal Daughter	Jacques Doillon	Jane Birkin, Michel Piccoli	Drama	
Quest for Fire	Jean-Jacques Annaud	Everett McGill, Rae Dawn Chong, Ron Perlman	Adventure	Canadian-French co-production
Strange Affair	Pierre Granier-Deferre	Gérard Lanvin, Michel Piccoli, Nathalie Baye	Drama	
Teheran 43	Alexander Alov	Alain Delon, Claude Jade, Curd Jurgens	Thriller	French-Russian co-production
Un étrange voyage	Alain Cavalier	Jean Rochefort, Camille de Casabianca, Arlette Bonnard	Drama	
The Woman Next Door	François Truffaut	Fanny Ardant, Gérard Depardieu, Henri Garcin	Drama	
Zombie Lake	Julian de Laserna, Jean Rollin	Howard Vernon, Pierre-Marie Escourrou, Anouchka	Horror	French-Spanish co-production

== Notes ==
=== References ===
- Paul, Louis (2005). Italian Horror Film Directors. McFarland. ISBN 978-0786487493.
- Kay, Glenn (2008). Zombie Movies: The Ultimate Guide. Chicago Review Press. ISBN 978-1569766835.
