= List of horror films of 1981 =

A list of horror films released in 1981.

Title	Director(s)	Cast	Country	Notes	Ref.
Absurd	Joe D'Amato	George Eastman, Annie Belle, Charles Borromel	Italy	Alternative title(s): Rosso Sangue; Anthropophagus 2; The Grim Reaper 2; Zombie 6: Monster Hunter	
The Alchemist	James Amante, Charles Band	Robert Ginty, Lucinda Dooling, John Sanderford	United States		
Alison's Birthday	Ian Coughlan	Joanne Samuel, Margie McCrae, Martin Vaughan	Australia		
An American Werewolf in London	John Landis	David Naughton, Griffin Dunne, Jenny Agutter	United States; United Kingdom		
The Beyond	Lucio Fulci	David Warbeck, Catriona MacColl, Al Cliver	Italy	Alternative title(s): The Seven Doors of Death	
The Black Cat	Lucio Fulci	Patrick Magee, Mimsy Farmer, David Warbeck	Italy; United Kingdom		
Blood Beach	Jeffrey Bloom	David Huffman, Marianna Hill, John Saxon	United States		
Bloody Moon	Jesús Franco	Nadja Gerganoff, Otto Retzer, Jasmin Losensky	Germany		
The Boogens	James L. Conway	Rebecca Balding, Fred McCarren, Anne-Marie Martin	United States		
The Burial Ground	Andrea Bianchi		Italy		
The Burning	Tony Maylam	Leah Ayres, Larry Joshua, Jason Alexander	United States		
Butcher, Baker, Nightmare Maker	William Asher, Michael Miller	Susan Tyrrell, Jimmy McNichol, Julia Duffy	United States	Alternative title(s): Night Warning; Nightmare Maker	
Cannibal Ferox	Umberto Lenzi	Danilo Mattei, Zora Kerova, John Bartha	Italy; Spain	Alternative title(s): Make Them Die Slowly; Woman From Deep River	
Cataclysm	Phillip Marshak, Tom McGowan	Cameron Mitchell, Marc Lawrence	United States	Alternative title(s): Satan's Supper; The Nightmare Never Ends	
Dark Night of the Scarecrow	Frank De Felitta	Lane Smith, Jocelyn Brando, Charles Durning	United States	Television film	
Dawn of the Mummy	Frank Agrama, Armand Weston	Brenda King, Barry Sattels, George Peck	United States		
A Day of Judgment	Charles Reynolds	William T. Hicks, Harris Bloodworth, Deborah Bloodwoth	United States		
Dead & Buried	Gary Sherman	James Farentino, Melody Anderson, Jack Albertson	United States		
Deadly Blessing	Wes Craven	Maren Jensen, Susan Buckner, Sharon Stone	United States		
Demonoid	Alfredo Zacarías	Samantha Eggar, Stuart Whitman, Roy Jenson	Mexico		
Docteur Jekyll et les femmes	Walerian Borowczyk	Udo Kier, Marina Pierro, Howard Vernon	France		
Don't Go Near the Park	Lawrence D. Foldes	Aldo Ray, Meeno Peluce, Barbara Bain	United States		
Don't Go in the Woods	James Bryan	Nick McClelland, James P. Hayden, Mary Gail Artz	United States		
The Evil Dead	Sam Raimi	Ellen Sandweiss, Bruce Campbell, Theresa Tilly	United States	First film of Evil Dead franchise	
Evilspeak	Eric Weston	Clint Howard, R. G. Armstrong, Lynn Hancock	United States		
Eyes of a Stranger	Ken Wiederhorn	Lauren Tewes, Jennifer Jason Leigh, John DiSanti	United States		
Fear No Evil	Frank LaLoggia	Stefan Arngrim, Elizabeth Hoffman, Kathleen Rowe McAllen	United States		
Final Exam	Jimmy Huston	Sam Kilman, Cecile Bagdadi, DeAnna Robbins	United States		
Friday the 13th Part 2	Steve Miner	Amy Steel, John Furey, Adrienne King	United States	Second film of Friday the 13th franchise	
Full Moon High	Larry Cohen	Adam Arkin, Roz Kelly, Elizabeth Hartman	United States		
The Funhouse	Tobe Hooper	Elizabeth Berridge, Cooper Huckabee, Largo Woodruff	United States		
Galaxy of Terror	Bruce D. Clark	Robert Englund, Sid Haig, Grace Zabriskie	United States		
Ghost Story	John Irvin	Fred Astaire, Douglas Fairbanks, Jr., Alice Krige	United States		
Ghostkeeper	Jim Makichuk	Riva Spier, Murray Ord, Sheri McFadden	Canada		
Graduation Day	Herb Freed	Christopher George, Patch MacKenzie, E. Danny Murphy	United States		
Halloween II	Rick Rosenthal	Donald Pleasence, Jamie Lee Curtis	United States	Second film of Halloween franchise	
The Hand	Oliver Stone	Michael Caine, Andrea Marcovicci, Annie McEnroe	United States		
Happy Birthday to Me	J. Lee Thompson	Melissa Sue Anderson, Glenn Ford, Tracey E. Bregman	Canada		
Hell Night	Tom DeSimone	Linda Blair, Vincent Van Patten, Peter Barton	United States		
Home Sweet Home	Nettie Peña	Peter de Paula, Vinessa Shaw, Jake Steinfeld	United States		
The House by the Cemetery	Lucio Fulci	Catriona MacColl, Paolo Malco, Kenneth A. Olsen	Italy		
The Howling	Joe Dante	Dee Wallace, Patrick Macnee, Dennis Dugan	United States		
Inseminoid	Norman J. Warren	Judy Geeson, Robin Clarke, Jennifer Ashley	United Kingdom		
The Intruder Within	Peter Carter	Chad Everett, Joseph Bottoms, Jennifer Warren	United States	Television film	
Just Before Dawn	Jeff Lieberman	Chris Lemmon, Deborah Benson, George Kennedy	United States		
The Loch Ness Horror	Larry Buchanan	Sandy Kenyon, Miki MacKenzie	United States		
Madhouse	Ovidio G. Assonitis	Trish Everly, Michael MacRae, Dennis Robertson	United States	Alternative titles: And When She Was Bad; Scared to Death; There Was a Little Girl	
Midnight Lace	Iván Nagy	Mary Crosby, Gary Frank, Celeste Holm, Carolyn Jones, Robin Clarke, Shecky Greene	United States	Television film	
The Monster Club	Roy Ward Baker	Vincent Price, John Carradine, Donald Pleasence	United Kingdom		
Ms .45	Abel Ferrara	Zoe Tamerlis	United States		
The Munsters' Revenge	Don Weis	Fred Gwynne, Yvonne De Carlo, Al Lewis, Jo McDonnell, K. C. Martel, Sid Caesar, Bob Hastings	United States	Television film	
My Bloody Valentine	George Mihalka	Paul Kelman, Lori Hallier, Neil Affleck	Canada		
Mystics in Bali	H. Tjut Djalil	Ilona Agathe Bastian, Yos Santo, Sofia W.D.	Indonesia		
The Nesting	Armand Weston	Robin Groves, Christopher Loomis, Michael David Lally	United States		
Night School	Ken Hughes	Leonard Mann, Rachel Ward, Drew Snyder	United States		
Nightmare	Romano Scavolini	Baird Stafford, Sharon Smith, C. J. Cooke	United States	Alternative title(s): Nightmares in a Damaged Brain	
Omen III: The Final Conflict	Graham Baker	Mason Adams, Lisa Harrow, Sam Neill	United Kingdom; United States	Third film of The Omen franchise	
Piranha II: The Spawning	James Cameron	Tricia O'Neil, Steve Marachuk, Lance Henriksen	Italy	Sequel to Piranha (1978)	
The Pit	Lew Lehman	Sammy Snyders, Jeannie Elias, Laura Hollingsworth	Canada; United States		
Porno Holocaust	Joe D'Amato, Bruno Mattei	George Eastman, Annj Goren, Dirce Funari	Italy		
Possession	Andrzej Zulawski	Isabelle Adjani, Sam Neill, Heinz Bennent	France; West Germany		
The Prowler	Joseph Zito	Vicki Dawson, Christopher Goutman, Cindy Weintraub	United States		
Scanners	David Cronenberg	Stephen Lack, Jennifer O'Neill, Michael Ironside	Canada		
Scared to Death	William Malone	John Stinson, Diana Davidson, Jonathon David Moses	United States		
Strange Behavior	Michael Laughlin	Michael Murphy, Louise Fletcher, Dan Shor	Australia; New Zealand		
Suddenly at Midnight	Ko Young-nam	Kim Young-ae, Yoon Il-bong, Lee Ki-seon	South Korea		
The Survivor	David Hemmings	Robert Powell, Jenny Agutter, Joseph Cotten	Australia		
This House Possessed	William Wiard	Parker Stevenson, Lisa Eilbacher	United States	Television film	
Venom	Piers Haggard	Klaus Kinski, Oliver Reed, Sterling Hayden, Sarah Miles	United Kingdom		
Wolfen	Michael Wadleigh	Albert Finney, Diane Venora, Edward James Olmos	United States		

== Sources ==
- Hardy, Phil, ed. (1995). The Overlook Film Encyclopedia. Vol. 3. Overlook Press. ISBN 0-87951-624-0.
- Heller-Nicholas, Alexandra (2011). Rape-Revenge Films: A Critical Study. McFarland & Company. ISBN 978-0-7864-4961-3.
- Joshi, S. T. (2007). Icons of horror and the supernatural: an encyclopedia of our worst nightmares. Vol. 2. Greenwood Publishing Group. ISBN 978-0-313-33782-6.
- Kerekes, David; Slater, David (2005). See No Evil: Banned Films and Video Controversy. London, England: Headpress. ISBN 978-1-900-48610-1.
- Mazur, Eric (2011). Encyclopedia of Religion and Film. Santa Barbara, California: ABC-CLIO. ISBN 978-0-313-33072-8.
- Muir, John Kenneth (2010). Horror Films of the 1980s. Jefferson, North Carolina: McFarland. ISBN 978-0-786-45501-0.
- Pratley, Gerald (2003). A Century of Canadian Cinema: Gerald Pratley's Feature Film Guide, 1900 to the Present. Toronto, Ontario: Lynx Images. ISBN 978-1-894-07321-9.
- Shelley, Peter (2012). Australian Horror Films, 1973-2010. Jefferson, North Carolina: McFarland. ISBN 978-0-786-46167-7.
- Warren, Bill (2001) [2000]. The Evil Dead Companion. St. Martin's Griffin. ISBN 0-312-27501-3.
- Warren, Wheeler Winston (2010). A History of Horror. Rutgers University Press. ISBN 978-0-8135-4796-1.
- Young, R. G. (2000). The Encyclopedia of Fantastic Film: Ali Baba to Zombies. Hal Leonard Corporation. ISBN 1-55783-269-2.
