= Marina Pierro =

Italian actress, model and writer

- Born: 9 October 1956 (age 69); Boscotrecase, Italy
- Occupation: Actress
- Years active: 1976–1990
- Website: marinapierro.com

Marina Pierro (born 9 October 1956, or 1960) is an Italian actress, model, writer, and film director, who is best known for her artistic relationship with Polish filmmaker Walerian Borowczyk (1923–2006). Pierro and Borowczyk's collaboration lasted approximately ten years and comprised five completed films and one foray into episodic television.

Pierro has been described as an "erotic icon of auteur cinema" and she has referred to herself as Walerian Borowczyk's muse.

== Early life ==
Marina Pierro was born in Boscotrecase in the Campanese region of Italy. Various sources give 1956 and 1960 as the year of her birth.

Pierro spent her childhood and adolescence in Turin where her family had moved a few years after Pierro's birth. At an early age, Pierro showed talent in drawing and painting, which led her to artistic studies. Pierro followed photography and theatre courses; studied French; had interests in astrology, esotericism, and psychoanalysis; and maintained a passion for cinema and acting. While studying drawing and painting at Turin's Accademia Albertina, Pierro performed in theatre.

== Career ==
=== Debut and first films ===
Pierro moved to Rome and began a career in modelling, doing fashion spreads for magazines such as Harper's Bazaar and Vogue Italia, whilst looking for film work. Pierro's film career began with minor roles in several Italian films in 1976, most notably Luchino Visconti's final film, L'innocente (The Innocent). Pierro got the part after meeting Visconti's assistant, Albino Cocco, whilst walking through Cinecittà studios in Rome: "Visconti's assistant, a friend, introduced me to his boss who was looking for a young girl to play a lady companion, a secondary role, but of great importance to me. On a professional and private level, Visconti was unrivalled in all fields."

Pierro subsequently appeared on the cover of the 9 December 1975 issue of Cinema d'oggi (Cinema Today), introduced as "The latest cinematographic discovery by Luchino Visconti." After appearing in The Innocent, Pierro gave an interview in which she stated,

...I consider myself an actress [rather than a model], not only because I like cinema more, but also because, despite being 18, I already have some cinematic experience behind me... [Visconti] was always very kind to me. When I was introduced to him I had an insane fear of his judgment. He looked at me and said, "You're all mouth." He said something curious. I laughed. I liked him and so I had the part of Laura Antonelli's confidante in The Innocent. Evidently [Visconti] was happy with me because he said he would have entrusted me with an important part in Thomas Mann's The Magic Mountain, which sooner or later he wanted to make... It would have been a great experience... Surrealist painting and surrealism have generally influenced me. It's a passion I take with me from art in high school. It is no coincidence that one of my dreams would be to work with Buñuel, who makes surrealist cinema.

Pierro mentioned she was going to appear alongside James Mason and Luciana Paluzzi in a film by Allen Reisner titled Greenhouse Flower, but this project never eventuated. She played a maid in the 1976 film I prosseneti (The Panderers), written and directed by Brunello Rondi. Pierro played an assistant physiotherapist in Alfredo Rizzo's comedy Sorbole... che romagnola (1976) and a newlywed in the 1976 Italian/Spanish sex comedy Taxi Love, servizio per signora (a.k.a. Taxista de senoras), directed by Sergio Bergonzelli on location in Pescara. Pierro appeared in Dario Argento's supernatural horror film Suspiria (1977) as an uncredited extra before her first prominent role, as the self-styled stigmatic nun Sister Veronica in Walerian Borowczyk's 1977 film Interno di un Convento (Behind Convent Walls), based upon Stendhal's Promenades dans Rome (1829). Of Borowczyk casting her in the film, Pierro recalled,

He noticed a picture of me in the actors’ yearbook and he asked to meet me. I was surprised that he wanted to see me. This was the director everyone was talking about for the scandal caused by his films, such as The Beast, which I had actually seen a while before, and which had made a strong impression on me for the beauty of the cinematography, the framing, its daring style. But most of all, I was impressed by the surreal dimension of the film... I had a strong interest in Surrealism, in poetry and painting. I particularly liked the films of Luis Buñuel. Our first meeting was...quite surreal. He was speaking Italian, I was speaking French. He was walking around me while asking me questions. For example, if I had attended a theatre academy. I said I had been on set with Visconti for one month in my very first film role, and that was it. And he said, “That's more than enough.” Then we talked almost entirely about painting, about the light in paintings by Vermeer and Turner. And then we talked about Rimbaud, Lautréamont... Then he asked me to wear a nun's veil while he continued walking around me. And then suddenly he said, “Do you know, you are incredibly photogenic?” I immediately said, “Yes, I know.” He laughed and told me that I would play Sister Veronica. Maybe it was at that moment that I became his muse. Of course I wasn't aware of it because things were happening so fast that it was hard for me to stop and think for a second. Only afterwards did I think back to that feeling, like an electric shock – a wave that connected us in a very particular way, creating an artistic collaboration that lasted around ten years over six films.

Borowczyk told Pierro that, as a fan of Italian Renaissance painters, he found in her "the classic Italian figure." Pierro was greatly affected by the experience of meeting Borowczyk and appearing in Behind Convent Walls:

Walerian was an extremely polite person, yet not quite formal... He had a refined sensitivity. He was a non-conformist by nature, I'd say. He also had this particular gift of finding unpredictable, unheard-of association between things that were apparently disparate. In the language of graphology, you'd say that his personality was methodically uneven, with a skill for prolonged and intense attention. The shooting of Behind Convent Walls was for me fundamental and illuminating, in two respects. First of all, as an actress. Walerian left some freedom to the actors, of course within the range of the character, and he accepted suggestions. At the same time, he expected the actor to guess what he wanted, and this was undoubtedly more complex, as it entailed maximum attention and maximum speed of execution. To me, this was a revelation because that method perfectly matched me instinct to express myself in the immediacy of a moment. The second aspect was also important – the awareness that working in film was full of never-ending possibilities of expression. Being on the set of a film by Walerian was not only fascinating but truly educational, just like a film school.

Meeting Pierro had a significant effect on Borowczyk's career as well. Borowczyk cast Pierro in almost all of his subsequent feature films, and it has been noted that Pierro effectively supplanted Borowczyk's wife Ligia Branice, who had appeared in her husband's Goto, Island of Love (1968) and Blanche (1971) as well as Behind Convent Walls. David Thomson wrote,

Italian actress Marina Pierro...starred in most of Borowczyk's late features and became a muse to supplant [Ligia] Branice. While the latter usually played a precious flower in danger of being trampled, Pierro's proud Italianate features, confident pose, and well-rounded body signified a perfect femininity for the Polish director.

Similarly, Kuba Mikurda (director of the 2018 documentary film Love Express: The Disappearance of Walerian Borowczyk) wrote,

Behind Convent Walls marks the final appearance of Ligia - it's as if two of [Borowczyk's] muses are passing each other on the screen. Under Pierro's influence, women in [Borowczyk's] films change - the ethereal, passive, luminous women played by Ligia become the strong, active, and carnal ones played by Marina.

According to Peter Tombs,

[Pierro's] role in Behind Convent Walls was a difficult one on several counts. For a start it was her first really substantial role and she was playing the role in French. But even more confusing was that it combined certain aspects of her real life with fiction. In the film Pierro plays the part of a nun, Sister Veronique, who is going mad. At various points throughout the film she engages in a variety of yoga exercises. Pierro had practiced these Eastern arts, and she found it strange mixing this aspect of the character with her real life. It was sometimes hard to maintain the balance, to see where the script ended and she began.

=== 1979-1981 ===
Working again with Borowczyk, Pierro played the Renaissance artist Raphael's treacherous mistress Margherita Luti in "Margherita," the first episode of the 1979 triptych anthology film Héroïnes du Mal (Immoral Women), a quasi-sequel to Borowczyk's 1973 erotic anthology film Contes immoraux (Immoral Tales). Taking place in early 16th century Rome, "Margherita" begins with Raphael (François Guétary) spying on Margherita - a baker's daughter - making love with her fiancé, Tomaso (Gérard Falconetti). While posing for a painting at Raphael's studio, Margherita is spied upon by the wealthy banker, Bernardo Bini (Jean-Claude Dreyfus). After Raphael pierces his eye with a paint-brush, Bini sets out to seduce Margherita and, tempting her with jewels, have her poison Raphael with drugged cherries. Ultimately, Margherita takes advantage of Bini and Raphael's sexual obsession with her, outwitting both men before returning with Bini's jewels to her true love, Tomaso.

According to Pierro, Immoral Women strengthened the public association between herself and Borowczyk:

I remember that even at the end of the shooting of Behind Convent Walls, [Borowczyk] asked me to shoot another film in Paris, an episodic film in the same style as Immoral Tales, for which he had already written two episodes. He said he'd look around and find a character for me to play, taken from the history of Italian art. He chose Raphael's muse, the “Fornarina,” also as a homage to Italian art and the Renaissance artists which he loved so much. So the press started to liken Raphael's muse to Borowczyk's muse.

Portraying Margherita as a doe-eyed femme fatale outwitting the men around her, Pierro spends most of her time in Immoral Women either naked or dressed in flimsy, transparent veils, and engaged in graphic sex scenes. Pierro later admitted,

I am timid as all actors. No more or less. However, I think you have to push yourself - put yourself in different situations to test your own limits. But I still find these scenes a little embarrassing... There are definitely some things I have in common with this character. She wants some of the good things in life and so she acts with a sort of mixture of naivete and deceit in order to get them. But I'm not a femme fatale.

Premiering in March 1979, Immoral Women drew mixed to negative reviews, although Marina Pierro's performance received praise. Reviewing Immoral Women for L'Express, Michel Braudeau wrote,

Walerian Borowczyk imagines in his own fashion the death of Raphael in the features of his model Margherita Luti... It must be said that if death has the eyes of Marina Pierro (already seen in Behind Convent Walls) we would go more readily to the appointment. Beautiful, indeed, like "La Fornarina" of Rome, [Pierro] has the magnificent indifference [and] the cold sensuality of a heroine of Stendhal's Italian Chroniques, and the camera of Borowczyk pays a passionate homage... The other parts of the triptych are unfortunately less convincing... Capable of the best, Borowczyk is not always immune to mediocrity. After Marina Pierro, the heroines seem bland and the evil is not as good. Borowczyk was kind enough to serve us the best as a starter.

Describing Immoral Women as "a surreal masterpiece and possibly Borowczyk's finest work" in the online film journal Senses of Cinema in 2005, Scott Murray wrote, "Marina Pierro, having now replaced Ligia Branice (Goto, l’île d’amour, Blanche, etc.) as the director's muse, glows in her finest performance." Describing Margherita as a femme fatale, Murray wrote,

The victory of a powerless woman from the working class is absolute... Margherita has succeeded because men thought she was their pawn. She was lured away from her lover and her social class, and then preyed upon by men who believed wealth can and does control everything. Given the patriarchy that existed at the time, [Bini and Raphael] had no reason to feel other than confident. But they underestimated Margherita, a scheming, resourceful woman in the grand tradition of the two Lucrezias (Contes Immoraux and Interno di un Convento). She manipulates men while allowing them to think of her as a victim, her murderous revenge and theft merely the acts of a woman reasserting control over her own destiny (and image)… In a world of marginalized women, she has used a natural asset (her sex) to attain what is otherwise denied her (wealth).

Pierro's third film with Borowczyk was the 1981 horror film Docteur Jekyll et les femmes (a.k.a. Dr Jekyll and his Women, Blood of Dr Jekyll, and Bloodbath of Dr Jekyll). In Borowczyk's radical interpretation of Robert Louis Stevenson's Dr Jekyll and Mr Hyde, Pierro in a co-leading role plays Fanny Osbourne (named after Stevenson's real-life wife), the fiancée of Dr Henry Jekyll (Udo Kier) and essentially an original character on the part of Borowczyk and Pierro. According to Pierro, it was the character of Fanny Osbourne that prompted Borowczyk to make the film:

[Borowczyk] had an offer to direct a film about Dr Jekyll. He liked the idea, but he didn't want to direct a remake, and he noticed that there wasn't a female character in the book. So he told me that he'd think about it and if he happened to find it interesting, he would do it. Actually, that was how he discovered the existence of Fanny Osbourne, the wife of Robert Louis Stevenson, a very adventurous and independent woman for the time. Borowczyk was enthusiastic about the idea of mixing cards, just like...a magician, and introducing this real figure into the fiction. So that's how the character of Miss Osbourne was born.

Borowczyk intended his film to be titled Le cas étrange de Dr. Jekyll et Miss Osbourne (The Strange Case of Dr Jekyll and Miss Osbourne) and this was its title during production. Borowczyk's film - set in 19th century London - details the murder and debauchery that takes place in the home of Dr Henry Jekyll on the night of Jekyll and Fanny Osbourne's engagement party. By immersing himself in a bath filled with a chemical cocktail, Jekyll physically transforms to his alter ego, Mr. Hyde (Gérard Zalcberg). Hyde has none of Jekyll's restrictions of morality and he proceeds to rape, torture, and murder various guests, male and female alike. The story has a twist ending of sorts when Fanny finally discovers her fiancé's secret.

The film's extreme violence ensured it would run afoul of the censors of the time, but Pierro - a fan of horror films - believes the violence was justified by the narrative:

Fanny Osbourne is trapped in an impossible situation. She is reacting against the whole period in which she lives, the Victorian age. You have to see that it's this interior violence that explains her decision to plunge into the bath of blood.

Docteur Jekyll et les femmes was shot in four weeks, a shorter time than had been planned, owing to budgetary issues. Swiss actor Howard Vernon, who appeared in the film as Jekyll's scientific rival Dr Lanyon, later claimed, "Borowczyk was very much in love with the leading actress, Marina Pierro, an Italian girl." Udo Kier recalled in 2015, "Marina... I haven't seen her for a long time...but she was a beautiful, beautiful woman...beautiful body... I think that Marina, she worked a lot with Borowczyk, he taught her a lot because they knew each other quite well. I think of all the people [in the film], she was directed the most."

Of her castmates and experience of the film shoot, Pierro herself recalled,

Udo Kier was a perfect Jekyll, determined and fragile. Rigid, but outside the box. The complete opposite of Mr Hyde, who is played by Gérard Zalcberg, whose face was a merciless, relentless mask – a disturbing, duplicitous identity. There was great chemistry between Udo and I. He was instinctive, sensitive, restless, just like me... The scene of the transformation in the bathtub, both of Jekyll and Fanny, was certainly one of the most important. Everything is in Fanny's gaze – the discovery of another Henry, not the one she knows; her repulsion for the new one, Mr Hyde; her attraction and final decision to get into the bathtub and be part of that world that she sees as dark and irrational, and that her gaze has been absorbed, taking possession of her mind first, and then through the immersion of her body into...this earth-coloured liquid, like a vortex that drags her into an abyss from which she might not return.

Of co-star Patrick Magee, Pierro recalled,

He spent a lot of time wandering around with a bottle - but he always managed to hide it when he was on set. I was dazzled by him, his talent. Some people have a touch of magic about them. And he was one of them. Truly one of the great actors.

The book Borowczyk: Cinéaste Onirique was released in conjunction with Docteur Jekyll et les femmes in 1981 and included a preface by Borowczyk's friend, the French Surrealist writer André Pieyre de Mandiargues, who wrote,

We cannot but praise this great filmmaker, who lives by and for the exaltation of the female body, for tightening the union of Jekyll and Hyde, and giving the dual character invented by Stevenson a new double: a bride, a lover, a devilish sister, a carnal reflection, wonderfully embodied by the Raphaelite beauty of Marina Pierro.

Pierro herself was quoted in the book, stating,

Walerian Borowczyk is very demanding but we know each other well. There may be a bond between us, he always offers me something new. I trust him completely. I know the film will exist. A Borowczyk film is so many things... He arrives on set and the film is already in his head. We don't waste time. It's great for an actress because, in this way, you are more natural.”

Pierro's face was utilized prominently in advertising of Docteur Jekyll et les femmes, including its trailer and posters; however, the title of the film itself became a source of contention, as Pierro has remarked:

Changing the original title, The Strange Case of Dr Jekyll and Miss Osbourne, was to totally misinterpret the spirit of the film. The film only existed because it created the character of Fanny Osbourne. Otherwise I don't think [Borowczyk] would have even shot it. The French title, which translates as Dr Jekyll and the Women, is not only ridiculous, but also misleading, and psychologically puerile, compared to the complexity and depth found both in the book and within the concept of the film. So Walerian was quite angry. He knew that his precedent would be followed by others, which did happen regularly. In Italy, for example, for example, the title was changed to In the Abyss of Delirium – no comment needed. As I said at the time, it was their delirium: of producers, distributors, and those following behind them.

Docteur Jekyll et les femmes won Walerian Borowczyk the award for "Best Feature Film Director" at the 1981 Sitges Film Festival. However, the film did not receive a theatrical release in America and it ran in Great Britain for only one week, without a press screening. The film was relatively obscure in the years following its release but it has enjoyed increasing critical esteem as part of renewed interest in the works of Walerian Borowczyk, and is often cited as one of the director's best films. A restored version of Docteur Jekyll et les femmes was released by Arrow Films in 2015 as The Strange Case of Dr Jekyll and Miss Osbourne, reflecting Borowczyk's preferred title and the importance of Pierro's character in the narrative.

=== 1982 ===
In 1982, Pierro had a notable role in cult filmmaker Jean Rollin's French horror film La Morte Vivante (The Living Dead Girl) as Hélène, the friend and blood-sister of the titular character (played by French actress Françoise Blanchard). Blanchard's character, Catherine Valmont, is a recently deceased heiress who returns from the dead with an insatiable appetite for human blood; Pierro's character Hélène, initially repulsed, decides to procure human victims for her undead friend.

Pierro had met Rollin briefly at the 1981 Sitges Film Festival, where Docteur Jekyll et les femmes was shown in competition and Rollin's film Fascination was also screening. The following year, Rollin was looking to cast the role of Hélène in The Living Dead Girl, and a friend suggested Pierro for the part. Rollin later stated that Pierro had a fiery temperament that was good for her character. Interviewed in 2002, Pierro's co-star Françoise Blanchard recalled,

I got on very well with Marina Pierro. I really love the style of these grand Italian actresses: 'Caterina, you can't work today. You're ill.' 'Yes I can, Marina.' There was a scene where Jean [Rollin] didn't want the living dead girl to cry. Marina went: 'Caterina, I can't believe you're dead.' I looked up at her and my tears started flowing. I really got on very well with her. She was very maternal with me. When I totally cramped up during the last scene...she was the one who started massaging my arms and legs. I looked up at her. Her throat was ripped open. The more I looked the more I froze. I had hurt her. I had hurt nearly everyone...by slashing at their throats with my long nails. I had ripped their mouths. And I had bitten Marina. I had bitten her throat. I didn't know how long my false nails were, you know. I had to bite off her thumb but the rubber was like a chewing gum...

Pierro herself recalled,

...I like horror films very much. Both to watch and to work on. I knew who Rollin was, but for me the most important thing is what I see in the person themselves, how I feel about them.

The Living Dead Girl was relatively successful and won a prize at Italy's Fanta Film Festival the year after its release in 1982. In that same year, Pierro appeared in two episodes of the Italian 3-part television miniseries La quinta donna (The Fifth Woman), starring Klaus Maria Brandauer, Turi Ferro, and Aurore Clément. In 1982, Pierro posed in a nude photoshoot for an issue of the Italian edition of Playboy magazine.

Pierro's fourth film with Borowczyk was the 1983 Italian/French co-production Ars Amandi (Art of Love). In this film - based upon the writings of Ovid - Pierro plays Claudia, wife of the Roman commander Macarius (Michele Placido) in Augustan Rome. While her husband is in Gaul, Claudia takes as her lover Ovid's young student Cornelius (Philippe Taccini). The film's coda takes place in the present day, with Pierro playing Claudine Cartier, a young archaeologist en route from Rome to Paris. Doing publicity for the film, Pierro stated, "Art of Love gives women a true sensuality, at least equal to that of men... Macarius symbolizes moral order and I symbolize free love."

The film had a troubled production involving conflict between Borowczyk and the film's producers: a misunderstanding led to the addition of hardcore scenes during post-production, which caused trouble with the Italian film censors. Advance publicity for Art of Love was not good: the film represented France in the San Sebastián International Film Festival in September 1983, but going into general release the following month, the film was a commercial flop. Pierro, however, has contended Art of Love is one of Borowczyk's best films; upon the film's UK home video release in 1993, Pierro pointed out how its humour has been overlooked:

...I like that a lot. Borowczyk's films are actually very light-hearted. But there is always this sense of irony that adds a certain weight to them. I think that's the most important thing about his films. Not the erotic aspects - although of course they're there and are very beautiful. Lots of people don't see this side of his films, it's true, but that's what makes it fun to work with him and why I continue to do so.

Following Art of Love, Borowczyk intended to make a film about the Egyptian queen Nefertiti starring Pierro. According to Pierro, Borowczyk was passionate about the project after he discovered a resemblance between Pierro and a bust of the queen. Borowczyk delivered a press conference on the subject of the film and scouted filming locations in Tunisia, and Pierro discussed the film in interviews:

The filming will take place in Egypt and Tunisia, at the beginning of next year... To prepare this new film by Walerian Borowczyk, I have already read several books. Nefertiti was not only the beautiful spouse of Akhenaten, and who wanted to impose a new religion, that of the sun... Nefertiti also had taste, the sense of responsibility and contact with the people... The hieroglyphics that adorned a temple that was dedicated to her and which unfortunately fell off were reconstructed by Egyptologists using a computer... The text has not been completely recomposed, bad one thing is sure... Nefertiti was not Egyptian. Walerian Borowczyk imagined that she had been abducted in England and snatched from her fiancé, a shepherd.

The Neferiti project was aborted during pre-production, and Pierro took some time off films to appear in avant-garde theatre in Rome. She also spent time writing pieces for theatre as well as a screenplay loosely inspired by Joseph Sheridan le Fanu.

=== 1987-1990 ===
In 1987, Pierro appeared in the first episode of Carlo Di Carlo's Cinque storie inquietanti (Five Disturbing Stories), a 5-part Italian television miniseries based upon the writings of American mystery writer Stanley Ellin. She then starred in Walerian Borowczyk's final feature-length film, 1987's love poem Cérémonie d'amour (Love Rites) as Miriam Gwen, a sultry, mysterious and philosophical prostitute who meets and lures the vain and naive clothes buyer Hugo (Mathieu Carrière) in the Paris Métro before seducing and torturing him. The film is based on the novel Tout disparaîtra (Everything Must Go) by André Pieyre de Mandiargues, whose 1967 novel La Marge was adapted to film by Borowczyk in 1976, and who provided the foreword to the 1981 book Borowczyk: Cinéaste Onirique.

Regarding her role in Love Rites, Pierro stated,

...Borowczyk immediately thought of me. Not daring to force Mandiargues' hand, he asked him who he saw in the role. The writer said: "One person: Marina Pierro." It was proof that I couldn't escape this movie. The story has interested me, moved me, fascinated me by its strangeness and poetry... [It] is naturally in perfect harmony with the theatrical and realist universe of Mandiargues, all through eroticism, strange rituals, violent images... Everything [in the film] happens in five hours, the time of a beautiful afternoon of spring in Paris. Miriam, my character, halfway between the comedian and the courtesan, leads a man, Hugo Arnold, played by Mathieu Carriere, in his fantasies. It begins by being completely submissive to him. This is what she asks, demands: to suffer all her whims. But all of a sudden, it changes completely. She's the one who becomes a dominatrix. She breaks him, radically, chases him away and summons him to his own destruction.

Pierro also stated,

...you could certainly say it's the most serious part I've played so far. It's a sort of femme fatale, again, but it's a role with a lot of hidden aspects, bits of the character that aren't immediately obvious. The most important thing in the film is the relationship between her and the man. You could say they are the mirror image of each other. It's not obvious at first, but that's what the film's really about. Its based on a book by André Pieyre de Mandiargues, a French writer who's often described as a surrealist, and lots of people describe Borowczyk as a surrealist film-maker. Here he's perhaps more of a symbolist than a surrealist.

Love Rites screened out of competition at Le Festival international du film fantastique d'Avoriaz in 1988 and enjoyed commercial success in Italy, where it was released as Regina della Notte (Queen of the Night). The film was not as successful in France; Borowczyk accused the film's executive producer, Alain Sarde, of promoting the film insufficiently after Borowczyk did not deliver the hardcore product Sarde wanted. In 2005, Cult Epic Films released Love Rites on DVD, an edition containing two versions of the film: the 97-minute "complete" version released to theatres, and Borowczyk's 87-minute director's cut. (Both cuts are included in the film's 2021 Blu-ray release by Kino Lorber.) Love Rites represented the only occasion in which Pierro played a modern-day character for the entirety of a Borowczyk film; her previous roles for the director were all set in historical periods of the past, excepting the conclusion of Art of Love.

However, Borowczyk and Pierro returned to a period setting for what turned out to be their final collaboration: "Un traitement justifié", an episode of the French-German erotic television series Softly from Paris (a.k.a. Série rose). Filmed in 1989 and first broadcast on 3 February 1990, Pierro plays an adulterous wife, Bianca (or Blanche) in an episode adapted from the fifth tale of the seventh night in Giovanni Boccaccio's 14th century collection The Decameron. A jealous, middle-aged husband (Witold Heretynski) disguises himself as a priest, and hears his wife Bianca's confession: she tells him she loves a priest who comes to her every night. The husband posts himself at the door to watch for the priest; meanwhile, Bianca takes advantage of a gap in the wall to bring her young lover - the next-door neighbor, who is not a priest - into her house for erotic encounters.

Kuba Mikurda wrote that "Un traitement justifié" is "effectively [Borowczyk's] last film" and likened it to the director's 1971 film Blanche, which starred Ligia Branice:

The main character has the same name (which is different from the one in Boccaccio) and an older, jealous husband, who imprisons her in a room, as well as a lover who breaks through the wall to get to her. In a sharp contrast to Blanche, though, everything ends well - Blanche reaches a climax in the arms of her lover. Again, the comparison of the two Blanches best capture the difference between [Borowczyk's] two muses, as well as between the two types of characters they played in his films.

=== Later work ===
Michael Brooke, a writer specializing in European cinema and an enthusiast of Borowczyk's films, has suggested the importance of Pierro in evaluating the director's work:

It's hard to ignore, not least because it's a matter of undeniable fact, that all [Borowczyk's] films fundamentally represent the viewpoint of a middle-aged heterosexual man. You can certainly defend them against charges of misogyny by pointing out that the female characters in his later films are generally far stronger-willed and far more in control of their sexual pleasure than was the norm in 1970s cinema, something that became especially clear when [Borowczyk] began a decade-plus collaboration with the Italian actress Marina Pierro.

For Redeemer magazine in 1993, Peter Tombs wrote,

Marina Pierro is an extraordinary actress who combines a sullen sensuality with an ethereal, almost nervous intensity. Her white skin, jet black hair and hypnotic eyes have made her an unforgettable presence in five films from the Polish born master of erotic cinema, Walerian Borowczyk. Yet to the public at large she remains unknown.

Of her relationship with Borowczyk, Pierro herself stated,

...above all we were united - we discovered it by working together – by the same visual conception of cinema, in which the fantastic and the poetic, the divine and the diabolical, and the "strange fascination" coexist.

Pierro's appearances on screen have been fleeting since the late 1980s, but she has directed three short films since - In Versi (2008, also starring), Himorogi (2012, also writer/producer), and Floaters (2016, also writer/producer). Pierro said, "Walerian knew that one day I would move on to directing, at least I hoped, and he encouraged me."

In Versi is a 25-minute film starring Pierro and is set in the library of the Abbey of Saint Scholastica, Subiaco. Himorogi is a 17-minute homage to Walerian Borowczyk that features allusions to his films as well as an electroacoustic music by Bernard Parmegiani, who had provided music for Docteur Jekyll at les femmes three decades before. The film was co-directed by Pierro's son, professional artist Alessio Pierro, who was also the cinematographer of all three of Pierro's short films. In his official website, Alessio Pierro describes Borowczyk as "an exceptional teacher" who was important for his formation by exploring various techniques of cinema and painting with him. Marina Pierro's 9-minute film Floaters is a portrait of Alessio Pierro.

Himorogi was presented at the 2012 Rome International Film Festival. It is also included as an extra feature in Arrow Films' Blu-ray release of The Strange Case of Dr Jekyll and Miss Osbourne; another feature of the release is a video interview Marina Pierro recorded in 2015, recounting her decade-long collaboration with Borowczyk.

In 2009, Pierro's book Nubi Ardenti (Fiery Clouds) was published by Cupressus. The book is a selection of poems written by Pierro between 1976 and 2009. Pierro has stated she is writing a book titled Ali d’inchiostro (Wings of Ink) about "the artistic path" that united her and Borowczyk, and she is also working on a film project based on a story by Gustav Meyrink. When asked why she does not act anymore, Pierro replied,

There is always a moment when something reaches its peak, and the gaze turns elsewhere. I have never understood the profession of actress as a series of sterile apparitions, as is increasingly the case. I don't feel I have given up acting, I simply enhanced my directorial point of view more but I would be ready to come back at any time for a real film and with directors who make their cinema a personal and authentically-felt vision, Sokurov, David Lynch, Bela Tarr, to name a few.

Despite her prominence in Borowczyk's filmography, Pierro is not seen or referred to in HBO Europe's feature-length documentary Love Express: The Disappearance of Walerian Borowczyk (2018), which ignores the 1977-1985 period of Borowczyk's career and the films therein (most of which Borowczyk made with Pierro). Nevertheless, Pierro has remained a staunch defender of Borowczyk, stating,

I think that Borowczyk's work doesn't need “re-evaluation.” His work was widely reviewed and admired in its deepest essence. It is enough to think of what André Breton said about his cinema, coining his famous definition of “the striking imagination.”

== Filmography ==
Film
Year	Title	Role	English title
1976	I prosseneti	Maid	
1976	L'innocente	Maria	The Innocent
1976	Taxi Love - Servizio per signora		
1977	Suspiria	(Uncredited extra)	
1977	Sorbole... che romagnola	Assistant physiotherapist	
1978	Interno di un convento	Sister Veronica	Behind Convent Walls
1979	Les héroïnes du mal	Margherita Luti	Immoral Women
1981	Docteur Jekyll et les femmes	Fanny Osbourne	The Strange Case of Doctor Jekyll and Lady Osbourne
1982	La morte vivante	Hélène	The Living Dead Girl
1983	Ars amandi	Claudia	
1987	Cérémonie d'amour	Miriam Gwen	Love Rites

Television
Year	Title	Role	Notes
1982	La quinta donna	Anna Toth	Miniseries (episodes 1 & 2)
1987	Cinque storie inquietanti	Sara	Miniseries (episode 1)
1990	Série rose (Softly from Paris)	Bianca	Season 2, episode 1

Short films
Year	Title	Credited work				Role
Year	Title	Director	Writer	Producer	Actor	Role
1990	La scommessa	—N/a	—N/a	—N/a	Yes	(unknown role)
2008	In versi	Yes	—N/a	—N/a	Yes	(unknown role)
2012	Himorogi	Yes	Yes	Yes	—N/a	—N/a
2016	Floaters	Yes	Yes	Yes	—N/a	—N/a
