= Murder Obsession =

- Film poster
- Directed by: Riccardo Freda
- Screenplay by: Antonio Cesare Corti; Fabio Piccioni; Riccardo Freda
- Story by: Antonio Cesare Corti; Fabio Piccioni
- Produced by: Enzo Boetani; Giuseppe Collura; Simon Mizrahi
- Starring: Stefano Patrizi; Martine Brochard; Henri Garcin; Laura Gemser; John Richardson; Anita Strindberg; Silvia Dionisio
- Cinematography: Cristiano Pogany
- Edited by: Riccardo Freda
- Music by: Franco Mannino
- Production companies: Dinysio Cinematografica; Societé Nouvelle Cinévog
- Distributed by: Regional
- Release date: 24 February 1981 (Italy)
- Running time: 97 minutes
- Countries: Italy; France
- Language: Italian

Murder Obsession (Italian: Follia omicida/ transl. Murder Madness), a.k.a. Fear, is a 1981 giallo-horror film directed by Riccardo Freda, and starring Laura Gemser, Silvia Dionisio and Anita Strindberg. It’s an international co-production film between Italy and France.

== Plot summary ==
A successful actor named Michael has a dark past where, at a young age, he stabbed his father to death. Along with his girlfriend Deborah, he visits his mother for the weekend and are joined by the director and other people involved in a film. Soon, the guests begin to get picked off and Michael fears his past will come back to kill him.

== Cast ==
- Stefano Patrizi as Michael Stanford
- Martine Brochard as Shirley
- Henri Garcin as Hans Schwartz
- John Richardson as Oliver
- Laura Gemser as Beryl
- Anita Strindberg as Glenda Stanford
- Silvia Dionisio as Deborah

== Production ==
Around 1969, Fabio Piccioni wrote a short story titled Il grido del Capricorno, which he later adapted into an adult comic book in the Oltretomba series. Living across from the office of Salvatore Argento, Piccioni approached Argento and sold him the rights to Il grido del Capricorno for 500,000 Italian lire. Some elements of Il grido del capricorno would later appear in Dario Argento's films The Bird with the Crystal Plumage and Deep Red. Piccioni reused elements of his story again years later in a contemporary setting, with a script made with Antonio Cesare Corti and Riccardo Freda that would become Murder Obsession. Some sources credit the film's original title as L'ossessione che uccide whereas the script located at the BiFi (Bibliothèque du film) in Paris is titled Deliria and is credited to Corti and Piccioni and dated from 1976. The Deliria script is generally identical to the script used in Murder Obsession with only a few characters' names changed.

According to Riccardo Freda's daughter Jacqueline Freda, her father took on the script to re-enter the film market after his latest absence from the industry, and to earn potential financing for a pet project based on the life of Italian World War I fighter ace Francesco Baracca. Murder Obsession was an Italian and French co-production, with the Italian producer Enzo Boetani and his company Dinoysio Cinematografica. Boetani had known Freda for years but never had a chance to actually complete a project with him, having worked together on one unknown project and another entitled Superhuman (which Boetani described as a superhero and professional wrestling styled film). Freda brought the script to Boetani and suggested doing it as an Italian and French co-production, with the French producer being his friend Simon Mizrahi.

Filming went on for three weeks in April 1980, predominantly in Palace Borghese in Artena and at Parco della Mola in Oriolo Romano. Actress Laura Gemser recalled her negative experience making the film, describing the filming as a "nightmare", specifically mentioning a scene where Anita Strindberg used a real knife to pretend to stab her. Martine Brochard also did not have fond memories of the filming, noting a scene where there is glass specifically cut to fit over her head and a camera with a chainsaw attached to it that got dangerously close to the actress. Both Brochard and Stefano Patrizi spoke negatively about working with Freda, with Brochard noting that he treated the French actors badly and Patrizi having little recollection of the film other than vaguely recalling that Freda was a "harsh man of few words, and not very affable" Riccardo Freda also edited the film in an uncredited capacity.

== Release ==
Murder Obsession was submitted to Italian film censors on October 15, 1980 and was passed on October 31 but was only released in Italy on February 24, 1981. Italian film historian Roberto Curti described it as having "mediocre business" which Boetani blamed on the distributor, who did not pay back the expected sum which lead to the production losing over 50 percent of the production costs. Freda dismissed the film, referring to it as "shit".

The film has been released on home video in the United States as Murder Obsession, Fear and The Wailing. The film was released as Fear on VHS by Wizard Video. The film was released on Blu-ray and DVD by Raro Video.

== Reception ==
From retrospective reviews, Louis Paul in his book Italian Horror Film Directors declared Murder Obsession to be "Freda's best film, although it doesn't make much sense" noting that Freda "confounds the viewer with hallucinations, red herrings galore and a decidedly downbeat ending" and concluding that the film "loves to play with the limitations of the genre and seeks to exceed the demands of its audiences at the same time."

== See also ==
- List of French films of 1981
- List of horror films of 1981
- List of Italian films of 1981
