= Lisbeth Hummel =

Danish film actress

Lisbeth Hummel (born 1952 in Copenhagen) is a Danish film actress. She is known for the controversial 1975 film La Bête, directed by Walerian Borowczyk, and La bella e la bestia and Dangerous Women, both directed by her husband Luigi Russo. She is now working as an artist, and lives in Denmark and Italy.
