= Immoral Women =

- Official teaser poster
- Directed by: Walerian Borowczyk
- Written by: Walerian Borowczyk; André Pieyre de Mandiargues
- Produced by: Pierre Braunberger
- Starring: Françoise Quéré; Marina Pierro; Jean-Claude Dreyfus
- Cinematography: Bernard Daillencourt
- Edited by: Walerian Borowczyk
- Music by: Philippe d'Aram; Olivier Dassault
- Production companies: Argos Films; Films du Jeudi
- Distributed by: Argos Films
- Release date: 7 March 1979
- Running time: 114 minutes
- Country: France
- Languages: French; Italian

Immoral Women (French: Les héroïnes du mal) is a 1979 French erotic drama film directed by Walerian Borowczyk, written by Borowczyk and André Pieyre de Mandiargues and starring Jean-Claude Dreyfus, Marina Pierro and Françoise Quéré.

== Synopsis ==
The film is divided into three self-contained episodes, set in different time periods and featuring female protagonists whose names all start with letter M as in the word mal (evil) and who commit crimes of passion.

- "Margherita", the ambitious mistress of the painter Raphael. Rome, 1520. This episode contains simulated sex between Margherita and Tomaso, the latter played by Gérard Falconetti, grandson of actress Maria Falconetti.
- "Marceline", the desirous adolescent daughter of a bourgeois family. Fin de siècle France.
- "Marie", the clever wife of a wealthy gallery owner. Modern day Paris.

== Cast ==
- Marina Pierro as Margherita Luti
- Gaëlle Legrand as Marceline Caïn
- Pascale Christophe as Marie
- François Guétary as Raphael Sanzio
- Jean-Claude Dreyfus as Bini
- Jean Martinelli as Pope
- Pierre Benedetti as Mad Painter
- Philippe Desboeuf as Doctor
- Noël Simsolo as Julio Romano
- Roger Lefrere as Michelangelo
- Gérard Falconetti as Tomaso
- Hassane Fall as Petrus
- France Rumilly as Madame Cain
- Yves Gourvil as Cain
- Lisbeth Arno as Floka
- Gérard Ismaël as Antoine
- Henri Piégay as Husband
- Mathieu Rivollier
- Robert Capia
- Daniel Marty
- Jacky Baudet
- Sylvain Ramsamy
- Jean Boullu
- Françoise Quéré
- Mazouz Ould-Abderrahmane
- Bernard Hiard

== Soundtrack ==
The score was composed by Philippe d'Aram and Olivier Dassault.

== Release ==
The film premiered on 7 March 1979 in a cinema release.
