= Nigel Anthony =

British actor (born 1941)

- Born: Nigel Anthony William Dagleish Gossling; 23 December 1941 (age 84); Reading, Berkshire, England
- Occupations: Actor; narrator
- Years active: 1956–present
- Children: 3

Nigel Anthony (born 23 December 1941) is an English actor. His theatre work includes Twelfth Night, Dutch Uncle, Happy End, The Taming of the Shrew for the Royal Shakespeare Company and seasons at Scarborough and Chichester. Television appearances include Ted Roach in Casualty (series 1 and 2) The Diary of Anne Frank, Coronation Street, Midsomer Murders, C.A.T.S. Eyes, Wycliffe and Doctors.

He has spent a large part of his career working in radio drama where he won a Sony award and a Radio Times award.
