= Renaissance (1963 film) =

- Film poster
- Directed by: Walerian Borowczyk
- Written by: Walerian Borowczyk
- Produced by: Jacques Forgeot
- Cinematography: Guy Durban
- Edited by: Claude Blondel
- Music by: Avenir de Monfred
- Animation by: Walerian Borowczyk
- Production company: Les Cinéastes Associés
- Distributed by: Connoisseur Film Ltd.
- Release date: December 1963 (France)
- Running time: 9 minutes
- Country: France

Renaissance (also known as Renesans) is a 1963 French reverse stop-motion animation short film directed by Walerian Borowczyk. The opening credits of the short include a dedication to experimental filmmaker Hy Hirsh, who died from a heart attack in 1961.

== Plot ==
An explosion reveals an obliterated corner of a room, and the remnants of several objects. They begin to reconstruct themselves, becoming books, a doll, a stuffed owl, and a trumpet. Books and furniture reassemble themselves. Finally, a bomb pieces itself back together and explodes, reducing the items to debris once more.

== Themes ==
Film critic Raymond Durgnat describes Renaissance as "a remembrance of things past, a meditation on a peasant-bourgeois stability, on what in it was life-affirming, what life-denying ... Implicit in the film is the question whether any human order can avoid destruction."

== Release ==
=== Home media ===
Arrow Films released a high-definition restoration of the film in Walerian Borowczyk: Short Films and Animations, one of five volumes included in Camera Obscura: The Walerian Borowczyk Collection, a dual-format box set released on 8 September 2014. The collection was limited to a thousand copies. Bonus content included an introduction by filmmaker Terry Gilliam; Film Is Not a Sausage, a featurette about Borowczyk's short films, with archival footage of the filmmaker and interviews with director André Heinrich, producer Dominique Duvergé-Ségrétin, and composer Bernard Parmegiani; Blow Ups, a visual essay by Daniel Bird about Borowczyk's paintings and poster work; a 32-page essay featuring essays and reviews on the director's work, as well as detailed restoration and projection notes; and several commercials made by Borowczyk during his career.

Olive Films also released a Blu-ray collection of the director's short films from 1959 through to 1984, The Walerian Borowczyk Short Film Collection, on 25 April 2017.

== Reception ==
Renaissance won the Solvay Prize and the Prize of the International Federation of Film Critics at the 1963 Knokke-le-Zoute International Experimental Film Festival. The film was also awarded the Jury's Special Prize at the 1963 International Film Festival Tours.

The film was screened out-of-competition at the 1965 Annecy International Animation Film Festival. In 2012, Renaissance was nominated for Fantastic Entertainment at the French Fantastic Cinema Retrospective.
