= Docteur Jekyll et les femmes =

- Directed by: Walerian Borowczyk
- Written by: Walerian Borowczyk
- Based on: Strange Case of Dr Jekyll and Mr Hyde by Robert Louis Stevenson
- Produced by: Jean-Pierre Labrande; Ralph Baum; Robert Kuperberg
- Starring: Udo Kier; Marina Pierro; Patrick Magee; Howard Vernon; Gérard Zalcberg
- Cinematography: Noël Véry
- Edited by: Kadisha Bariha
- Music by: Bernard Parmegiani
- Production companies: Whodunit Productions; Allegro Productions; Multimedia Gesellschaft für audiovisuelle Information mbH
- Release date: June 17, 1981 (France)
- Running time: 92 minutes
- Countries: France; West Germany
- Language: French

Docteur Jekyll et les femmes is a 1981 horror film directed by Walerian Borowczyk. The film is a variation on Robert Louis Stevenson's 1886 novella Strange Case of Dr Jekyll and Mr Hyde and stars Udo Kier, Marina Pierro, Patrick Magee, Howard Vernon, and Gérard Zalcberg.

The film, a co-production between France and West Germany, was released in France in 1981 and won an award for Best Feature Film Director at the 1981 Sitges Film Festival for Borowczyk.

== Plot ==
Fanny Osbourne and her mother arrive at the home of Dr. Henry Jekyll to celebrate their engagement. The party is attended by numerous dignitaries, including General Carew and his daughter; Dr. Lanyon, a close friend and mentor to Jekyll who is nonetheless nonplussed by Jekyll's endorsement of "transcendental science"; Enfield, Jekyll's attorney; and the Reverend. After dinner, the daughter of a guest is found raped and murdered in a bedroom. In the ensuing investigation, Carew kills the Osbournes' coachman, thinking he is the culprit. Someone finds a broken walking stick that had belonged to Jekyll; it had been used to beat a young girl to death.

Jekyll informs Enfield that he has named Edward Hyde as his sole heir should he die unexpectedly. When Enfield protests, Jekyll assures him that Hyde will take care of Fanny and their mothers. When Jekyll goes to see if he can revive the coachman, an unknown man appears and begins to attack the guests. He ties up Carew and forces him to watch as he ravishes the general's willing daughter, then beheads another guest when he tries to intervene before trapping a young male guest in the attic and raping him.

Jekyll returns and professes embarrassment and horror at what has happened to his guests. He barricades himself in his laboratory, unaware that Fanny has also hidden herself there. She watches as Jekyll plunges into a bath of unknown chemicals and transforms into his alter ego: Edward Hyde. Fanny follows Hyde through the house as he brutalizes more guests, including forcing Mrs. Osbourne to play the piano until her fingers are numb and killing the Carews with arrows. Seeing Fanny, Hyde tells her that he wants to watch her die, then wounds her with an arrow. But before he can kill her or Mrs. Osbourne, Hyde is interrupted by the gun-wielding Lanyon. He takes Lanyon to the laboratory, where he plays him a recording in which Jekyll pleads with Lanyon to give Hyde a dose of a chemical. Lanyon complies and watches in horror as Hyde transforms into Jekyll. Lanyon dies of a heart attack.

Jekyll takes the injured Fanny to his laboratory. He explains that he is not a hypocrite: his Jekyll persona is completely sincere in his generosity and humanity, and Hyde is completely sincere in his hatred and refusal to conform to social expectations. Seemingly addicted to Hyde's freedom, Jekyll prepares another bath. But before he can enter, Fanny immerses herself. She emerges un-transformed physically but possessed of the same contempt for morality. She then pushes Jekyll in, and he transforms into Hyde. Together, they kill the rest of the guests and servants and destroy the house—including Jekyll's notes and books on transcendental science. They then escape in a carriage, having violent sex until they transform back into Fanny and Jekyll.

== Cast ==
- Udo Kier as Dr. Henry Jekyll
- Marina Pierro as Fanny Osbourne
- Patrick Magee as General Carew
- Gérard Zalcberg as Mr. Edward Hyde
- Howard Vernon as Dr. Lanyon
- Clément Harari as Reverend Guest
- Jean Mylonas as Mr. Utterson
- Eugene Braun Munk as Mr. Enfield

== Release ==
Borowczyk wanted to call his film Le cas étrange de Dr.Jekyll et Miss Osbourne but his distributors UGC insisted it be released under the title Docteur Jekyll et les femmes. The film was released in France on June 17, 1981. Docteur Jekyll et les femmes never opened commercially in the United States, and in Britain, it played at one cinema for one week.

The film was released theatrically in the UK under the title The Blood of Dr. Jekyll and then later on video as Bloodlust. On the film's presentation at the Sitges Film Festival, it was shown under the title Docteur Jekyll et Miss Osborne. Arrow Films released the film in both the U.S. and UK on April 21, 2015, on Blu-ray and DVD. This was the film's first legitimate commercial release in any medium in the U.S. and the first in the UK since the VHS era. Arrow also restored Borowczyk's preferred title The Strange Case of Dr Jekyll and Miss Osbourne.

== Reception ==
The film won Walerian Borowczyk the award for Best Feature Film Director at the 1981 Sitges Film Festival.

== See also ==
- List of French films of 1981
- List of German films of the 1980s
- List of horror films of 1981

== Notes ==
=== References ===
- Atkinson, Michael (2008). Exile Cinema: Filmmakers at Work Beyond Hollywood. SUNY Press. ISBN 978-0-7914-7378-8.
