= The Living Dead Girl =

1982 French horror-drama film directed by Jean Rollin

- Original Theatrical Poster
- Directed by: Jean Rollin
- Written by: Jacques Ralf; Jean Rollin
- Produced by: Sam Selsky
- Starring: Marina Pierro; Françoise Blanchard; Mike Marshall; Carina Barone; Fanny Magieri; Patricia Besnard-Rousseau; Sam Selsky
- Edited by: Janette Kronegger
- Music by: Philippe D'Aram
- Distributed by: Films A.B.C.; Films Aleriaz; Films du Yaka
- Release date: 25 August 1982
- Running time: 86 minutes
- Country: France
- Languages: French; English

The Living Dead Girl (French: La morte vivante) is a 1982 French horror-drama film directed by Jean Rollin and starring Marina Pierro, Françoise Blanchard, Mike Marshall, Carina Barone, Fanny Magier, Patricia Besnard-Rousseau, and Sam Selsky. The story centers a young woman who has returned from the dead and needs human blood in order to survive.

== Plot ==
Two men break into an old crypt, seeking to dump toxic waste and rob the graves. When an earthquake causes the toxic waste to spill, Catherine Valmont, a young woman who died several years previously, is resurrected. She viciously kills the thieves and drinks their blood. As Catherine walks aimlessly through a field, Barbara spots her and takes a few photos, though Barbara's boyfriend, Greg, takes no notice. Catherine returns to her old house, the Valmont Mansion, and memories of her childhood come back to her, especially of her childhood friend, Hélène. As Catherine wanders the house, a real estate agent shows an old couple around the property, though they show little interest. After they leave, Hélène calls the house, presumably inquiring about the sale. However, she hears nothing on the line but the sound of an old cherished music box, leading her to believe that Catherine may still be alive.

The agent later returns to the Valmont Mansion, along with her boyfriend. Catherine interrupts them having sex, killing both and drinking their blood. Hélène arrives and is shocked to discover the dead bodies. When she finds Catherine, naked and playing the piano, she assumes that Catherine didn't really die but was actually hidden for the past two years. Hélène washes the blood off Catherine, puts her to bed, and drags the bodies down to the crypt, where she discovers the bodies of the grave robbers. Catherine creeps down and begins to drink the blood from one of the bodies, but Hélène stops her. Hélène cuts her arm and lets Catherine drink her blood.

Barbara goes around the village asking about the woman in the photographs she took, and the answer is always the same: it is Catherine Valmont, and she died two years ago. Greg thinks Barbara is making too much of it, and discourages her from investigating further. Meanwhile, Hélène tries to understand what is happening to Catherine, trying to teach her to speak again. Deciding to bring her victims, Hélène pretends to be out of fuel and flags down a helpful motorist, drawing her back to the mansion. Hélène offers the woman a drink and locks her in. The woman soon begins to panic, but Hélène throws her in the crypt, where Catherine grabs her and rips her stomach out. Soon after, Barbara shows up at the Valmont mansion, looking for Catherine. Unsettled by Catherine's behavior, she attempts to phone Greg, but Hélène confronts her. They argue, and Hélène tries to take Barbara's camera. Barbara flees.

Catherine, now more in touch with her humanity, realizes that she must be destroyed. She begs Hélène to kill her, but Hélène instead goes back to the village, to bring Catherine another victim. Barbara sees Hélène and convinces Greg to accompany her to the mansion in order to help Catherine. Hélène tortures the girl she kidnapped, but Catherine rejects the unwilling sacrifice and frees her, telling her to return to the village and seek help. Drawn by the screams, Barbara and Greg go to investigate, but they are brutally murdered by Hélène. Overwhelmed by all the death and murder, Catherine attempts suicide, but she is rescued by Hélène, who offers herself to sate Catherine's hunger. Unable to resist, Catherine devours her love alive.

== Cast ==
- Marina Pierro as Hélène
- Françoise Blanchard as Catherine Valmont
- Mike Marshall as Greg
- Carina Barone as Barbara Simon
- Fanny Magiere as 6th Victim (as Fanny Magieri)
- Patricia Besnard-Rousseau
- Véronique Pinson (as Veronique Pinson)
- Sandrine Morel as Teenage Catherine Valmont
- Sam Selsky as Old American Man

== Production ==
Rollin originally sought Italian actress Teresa Ann Savoy for the title role, but when she met him, Savoy said she would never work with Rollin under any circumstances. Instead, Blanchard was cast. She found the shooting to be physically exhausting and collapsed on the set. Blanchard's performance in the ending scene in which Catherine devours Hélène and descends into madness was apparently so believable that the crew were worried for her mental state.

Rollin met Pierro at the Sitges Film Festival, casting her for her strong personality, but finding her vain.

== Release ==
The original release was 25 August 1982. Alternate titles included The Living Dead Girl, Lady Dracula, Queen Zombie and Scare: Dead or Alive.

=== Censorship ===
La morte vivante was banned in Germany in 1986 for its explicit scenes of violence and gore. The film was released direct-to-video in the United Kingdom in 1994; however, most of these scenes were removed or shortened by the BBFC in order for the film to pass with an 18 certificate. A scene in which Catherine impales a woman's throat which her sharp fingernail was edited; one in which a female victim is disemboweled by Catherine was slightly cut to remove some of the prolonged gore; a scene in which Hélène slashes at a teenage girl's navel area was completely removed; the ending scene where Catherine eats Hélène alive was trimmed down; and the shot where Hélène's thumb is bitten off was cut. Some of these scenes were waived for the 2000 release, which also premiered on UK television for the first time in 2005 when it was screened on the Horror Channel. The film was eventually passed uncut in the UK in 2007.

=== Reception ===
Bloody Disgusting rated the Blu-ray release 3 out of 5, saying that the film has plenty of flaws but is worth watching.

=== Home media ===
In the United States, La morte vivante was initially released on DVD in an edited version on 9 November 1999, and was available in a "Widescreen Edition" via Image Entertainment and Redemption Films. It was re-released on DVD, complete and uncut for the first time, on 25 October 2010 by Redemption. Kino Lorber and Redemption released a Blu-ray version, as well as a remastered DVD on 7 August 2012, featuring an intro by Rollin, several featurettes and interviews, and a 12-page booklet.

In the United Kingdom, the film was first made available on VHS format in a direct-to-video release in 1994. It was issued on DVD on 2 May 2000, followed by a reissued VHS version on 8 May 2000. The DVD contained a cropped 4:3 aspect ratio, which was a transfer from the original video release and reversible cover artwork. Redemption released two subsequent DVD editions in the UK, the first on 3 September 2007, presenting the film complete and uncensored for the first time. The second was released on 18 May 2015, containing newly commissioned artwork.

La morte vivante, under the title The Living Dead Girl, received a Blu-ray release in the UK in 2018. Released by Black House Films, this version of the film has a 1:78:1 aspect ratio.

The complete uncut version was released by Encore Films in Europe on 30 November 2005 in a 2-DVD set with a new aspect ratio of 16:9/1.78:1. The special features included introductions by Blanchard (in French with English subtitles) and Rollin, selected scenes commentary by Blanchard (in French with English subtitles), a bonus soundtrack CD, a 64-page essay booklet, and interviews (all in French with English subtitles) with Blanchard, Jean-Pierre Bouyxou and composer Philippe d'Aram.
