= Love Rites =

- Film poster
- Directed by: Walerian Borowczyk
- Screenplay by: Walerian Borowczyk
- Based on: The novel Tout Disparaitra by André Pieyre de Mandiargues
- Starring: Mathieu Carrière; Marina Pierro
- Release date: 1987
- Country: France
- Language: French

Love Rites (also known as Cérémonie d'amour) is a 1987 erotic French film directed by Walerian Borowczyk and starring Mathieu Carrière and Marina Pierro.

The film is based on the novel Tout Disparaîtra by André Pieyre de Mandiargues.

== Plot ==
In the Paris Metro, a cocksure clothes buyer named Hugo picks up a woman named Myriam. After getting to know each other, Myriam takes Hugo back to her place and things take a very different turn.

== Media ==
Actress Marina Pierro stated about the film,

...you could certainly say it's the most serious part I've played so far. It's a sort of femme fatale, again, but it's a role with a lot of hidden aspects, bits of the character that aren't immediately obvious. The most important thing in the film is the relationship between her and the man. You could say they are the mirror image of each other. It's not obvious at first, but that's what the film's really about. Its based on a book by André Pieyre de Mandiargues, a French writer who's often described as a surrealist, and lots of people describe Borowczyk as a surrealist film-maker. Here he's perhaps more of a symbolist than a surrealist.

== Critical reception ==
SlashFilm, "Enigmatic and exquisite."

DVD Talk, "Love Rites is a well-made and interesting film, a bizarre erotic thriller with some strong acting and plenty of impressive visual style."
