= Dutch Uncle (play) =

- Original West End programme
- Written by: Simon Gray
- Original language: English
- Genre: Drama
- Setting: A house in Shepherd's Bush, London, 1952

Premiere
- Date premiered: 17 March 1969
- Place premiered: Theatre Royal, Brighton; The Aldwych Theatre, London
- Official website

Dutch Uncle is a play by Simon Gray set in a "living room in a decaying house in Shepherd's Bush" in 1952. It feature Mr. Godboy, whose obsession with the police leads him to go to elaborate lengths to get the attention of the charismatic Inspector Hawkins.

== Characters ==
- Mr. Godboy
- May Godboy
- Doris Hoyden
- Eric Hoyden
- Inspector Hawkins
- PC Hedderley

== Synopsis ==
Act I

Mr. Godboy has bought an enormous wardrobe. He is contractually obliged to provide a wardrobe for his upstairs tenants, Eric, and Doris Hoyden, he says, but at present, it stands in the living room, much to his wife May's annoyance. Godboy and May are in their fifties but have only been married for two years. May is already at the end of her tether with Godboy, as he spends all his spare time chatting to police at the police station about their latest cases and singing the praises of Inspector Hawkins. He is a trained chiropodist but has failed to get his career going. May and Godboy tell each other that they both have surprises for each other but won't reveal what they are. May is planning to walk out on her husband that day, while Godboy is planning to trap his wife in the new wardrobe and gas her with a new appliance he has bought. Before any of this can take place, however, Inspector Hawkins comes round unexpectedly, saying that he has heard a lot about Godboy from others at the police station, and as he was in the area conducting an operation he thought he would pop in. He explains that they are trying to catch the ‘Merrick Street attacker’, who has been stealing women's handbags. After he leaves, Godboy manages to lure May into the wardrobe, but as he is hurriedly preparing his gas appliance, she comes out of the wardrobe, packs her bags and leaves, oblivious to what Godboy has planned. Godboy then locks the wardrobe and pumps it full of gas.

Act II

The next day, Godboy agrees to remove corn from Doris's foot. Doris and Eric come down, but Godboy tells Eric he must leave them alone and should go and watch a film, which he does. As part of the treatment, Godboy insists that he must give Doris a bit of gas, but while he is fitting the gas mask Doris pulls out the pipe, giving Godboy a lungful of gas and sending him unconscious. Two hours later, Eric comes back to find Godboy delirious and claiming that Doris is dead in the kitchen. PC Hedderley, who has been helping investigate the Merrick Road attacker, comes round looking for Eric, who hides in the kitchen while Godboy is questioned. Once Hedderley leaves, Eric comes back insisting Godboy tell him where Doris is, believing that he has indeed killed her. But Hawkins and Hedderley quickly return, finding Eric, and asking to search his flat, where they find the stolen handbags. Doris returns and is shocked to find her husband arrested, and we find out that Hawkins has been obsessed with finding Doris for years, having once glimpsed her being searched at the police station. Eric suddenly realizes that Goboy must have murdered May and hidden the body in the wardrobe, and tells Hawkins. Godboy proudly allows Hawkins to fiddle open the padlock, saying it will be the crowning moment of his career. But to Godboy's surprise, the wardrobe is empty. Eric is led away, and Hawkins takes Doris under his wing, promising to train her up for the police force.

== Original Production ==
"Dutch Uncle" was first performed by the RSC at the Theatre Royal, Brighton on 17 March 1969, before its official opening at the Aldwych Theatre in London on 23 March 1969, directed by Peter Hall, with the following cast:

- Mr. Godboy - Warren Mitchell
- May Godboy - Megs Jenkins
- Doris Hoyden - John Alderton
- Eric Hoyden - Frances de la Tour
- Inspector Hawkins - Patrick Magee
- PC Hedderley - Nigel Anthony

The play closed after only 12 performances.
