= 1981 in film =

The following is an overview of events in 1981 in film, including the highest-grossing films, award ceremonies and festivals, a list of films released and notable deaths.

== Highest-grossing films (U.S.) ==
The top ten films released in 1981 by box office gross in North America are as follows:

Highest-grossing films of 1981
| Rank | Title | Distributor | Box-office gross |
|---|---|---|---|
| 1 | Raiders of the Lost Ark | Paramount | $212,222,025 |
| 2 | On Golden Pond | Universal | $119,285,432 |
| 3 | Superman II | Warner Bros. | $108,185,706 |
| 4 | Arthur | Warner Bros. | $95,461,682 |
| 5 | Stripes | Columbia | $85,297,000 |
| 6 | The Cannonball Run | 20th Century Fox | $72,179,579 |
| 7 | Chariots of Fire | Warner Bros. / 20th Century Fox | $58,972,904 |
| 8 | For Your Eyes Only | United Artists | $54,812,802 |
| 9 | The Four Seasons | Universal | $50,427,646 |
| 10 | Time Bandits | Embassy | $42,365,581 |

== Events ==
- January 20 – Former Governor of California and film actor Ronald Reagan is inaugurated president.
- March 30 – The 53rd Academy Awards are postponed due to the attempted assassination of President Ronald Reagan earlier that day. They are held the following day with a message from the President recorded for the ceremony prior to the assassination attempt.
- May 16 – Metro-Goldwyn-Mayer acquires beleaguered concurrent United Artists. UA was humiliated by the astronomical losses on the $40,000,000 movie Heaven's Gate, a major factor in the decision of owner Transamerica to sell it.
- June 8 – Marvin Davis acquires 20th Century Fox for $720 million.
- June 12 – Raiders of the Lost Ark is released by Paramount Pictures. It became Paramount's highest-grossing film of all time and set a major standard for many action-adventure movies to date and spawned four sequels.
- August 21 – An American Werewolf in London is released and becomes a landmark in Visual Effects and Makeup.
- October 1 – MGM president and chief operating officer David Begelman becomes chairman and chief executive officer of United Artists.
- November 1 – United International Pictures is created to handle international distribution of films for United Artists, MGM, Universal Pictures and Paramount Pictures to replace Cinema International Corporation following MGM's acquisition of UA.
- November 25 – Norman Lear and his partner Jerry Perenchio agree to buy Avco Embassy for $25 million.
- November 29 – Actress Natalie Wood drowns in a boating accident off Santa Catalina Island.

== Awards ==
| Category/Organization | 39th Golden Globe Awards January 30, 1982 | | 35th BAFTA Awards March 18, 1982 | 54th Academy Awards March 29, 1982 |
| Category/Organization | Drama | Musical or Comedy | 35th BAFTA Awards March 18, 1982 | 54th Academy Awards March 29, 1982 |
|---|---|---|---|---|
| Best Film | On Golden Pond | Arthur | Chariots of Fire | |
| Best Director | Warren Beatty; Reds | | Louis Malle; Atlantic City | Warren Beatty; Reds |
| Best Actor | Henry Fonda; On Golden Pond | Dudley Moore; Arthur | Burt Lancaster; Atlantic City | Henry Fonda; On Golden Pond |
| Best Actress | Meryl Streep; The French Lieutenant's Woman | Bernadette Peters; Pennies from Heaven | Meryl Streep; The French Lieutenant's Woman | Katharine Hepburn; On Golden Pond |
| Best Supporting Actor | John Gielgud; Arthur | | Ian Holm; Chariots of Fire | John Gielgud; Arthur |
| Best Supporting Actress | Joan Hackett; Only When I Laugh | | N/A | Maureen Stapleton; Reds |
| Best Screenplay, Adapted | Ernest Thompson; On Golden Pond | | Bill Forsyth; Gregory's Girl | Ernest Thompson; On Golden Pond |
| Best Screenplay, Original | Ernest Thompson; On Golden Pond | | Bill Forsyth; Gregory's Girl | Colin Welland; Chariots of Fire |
| Best Original Score | N/A | | Carl Davis; The French Lieutenant's Woman | Vangelis; Chariots of Fire |
| Best Original Song | "Arthur's Theme (Best That You Can Do)"; Arthur | | N/A | "Arthur's Theme (Best That You Can Do)"; Arthur |
| Best Foreign Language Film | Chariots of Fire | | N/A | Mephisto |

Palme d'Or (Cannes Film Festival):

Man of Iron (Człowiek z żelaza), directed by Andrzej Wajda, Poland

Golden Lion (Venice Film Festival):

Marianne and Juliane (Die Bleierne Zeit), directed by Margarethe von Trotta, W. Germany

Golden Bear (Berlin Film Festival):

Faster, Faster (Deprisa, deprisa / Vivre vite), directed by Carlos Saura, Spain / France

People's Choice Award (Toronto International Film Festival):

Chariots of Fire, directed by Hugh Hudson, United Kingdom

== 1981 films ==
=== By country/region ===
- List of American films of 1981
- List of Argentine films of 1981
- List of Australian films of 1981
- List of Bangladeshi films of 1981
- List of British films of 1981
- List of Canadian films of 1981
- List of French films of 1981
- List of Hong Kong films of 1981
- List of Indian films of 1981
  - List of Hindi films of 1981
  - List of Kannada films of 1981
  - List of Malayalam films of 1981
  - List of Marathi films of 1981
  - List of Tamil films of 1981
  - List of Telugu films of 1981
- List of Japanese films of 1981
- List of Mexican films of 1981
- List of Pakistani films of 1981
- List of South Korean films of 1981
- List of Soviet films of 1981
- List of Spanish films of 1981

=== By genre/medium ===
- List of action films of 1981
- List of animated feature films of 1981
- List of avant-garde films of 1981
- List of comedy films of 1981
- List of drama films of 1981
- List of horror films of 1981
- List of science fiction films of 1981
- List of thriller films of 1981
- List of western films of 1981

== Births ==
- January 1
  - Jonas Armstrong, Irish-English actor
  - Eden Riegel, American actress
- January 6
  - Betty Gabriel, American actress
  - Rinko Kikuchi, Japanese actress and director
  - Jérémie Renier, Belgian actor
- January 8 – Genevieve Cortese, American actress
- January 15 - Pitbull, Cuban-American rapper and actor
- January 17
  - Scott Mechlowicz, American actor
  - Diogo Morgado, Portuguese actor
- January 18 - Antje Traue, German actress
- January 19 - Elizabeth Tulloch, American actress
- January 20
  - Daniel Cudmore, Canadian actor
  - Crystal Lowe, Canadian actress and director
- January 21
  - Amanda Aday, American actress
  - Izabella Miko, Polish actress and dancer
  - David F. Sandberg, Swedish filmmaker
- January 22
  - O. T. Fagbenle, British actor, writer and director
  - Willa Ford, American singer, songwriter, model, television personality and actress
  - Beverley Mitchell, American actress
- January 23 - Julia Jones, American actress
- January 24 – Carrie Coon, American actress
- January 25 - Charlie Bewley, English actor and producer
- January 28
  - Gen Hoshino, Japanese actor and singer
  - Elijah Wood, American actor
- January 29 - Tenoch Huerta, Mexican actor
- January 30 – Chieko Higuchi, Japanese voice actress
- January 31 – Justin Timberlake, American singer and actor
- February 2 - Emily Rose, American actress
- February 5
  - Lee Eon, South Korean actor and model (d. 2008)
  - Sara Foster, American actress
  - Nora Zehetner, American actress
- February 7 - James Snyder, American actor and singer
- February 8
  - Dawn Olivieri, American actress
  - Jim Parrack, American actor
- February 9 – Tom Hiddleston, English actor
- February 10
  - Uzo Aduba, American actress
  - Stephanie Beatriz, Argentine actress
- February 11
  - Sonia Rolland, French-Rwandan actress
  - Kelly Rowland, American singer and actress
- February 12
  - Jesse Hutch, Canadian actor
  - Lauri Lagle, Estonian actor, director and screenwriter
- February 14 - Patrick Heusinger, American actor
- February 17 –
  - Joseph Gordon-Levitt, American actor
  - Paris Hilton, American media personality, singer and actress
- February 19
  - Beth Ditto, American singer-songwriter
  - Ethan Rains, Iranian-American actor
- February 20 - Majandra Delfino, American actress and singer
- February 22 – Elodie Yung, French actress
- February 23
  - Josh Gad, American actor and comedian
  - Mai Nakahara, Japanese voice actress
- February 25
- Manuel Garcia-Rulfo, Mexican actor
- Shahid Kapoor Indian actor
- February 26 - Demetrius Grosse, American actor and producer
- February 27 - Josh Groban, American singer-songwriter and actor
- March 2
  - Amos Crawley, Canadian actor
  - Bryce Dallas Howard, American actress
- March 3
  - Austin Highsmith Garces, American actress
  - Eugene, South Korean actress and singer
- March 5 - Hanna Alström, Swedish actress
- March 6 – Ellen Muth, American actress
- March 7 – Mona Fastvold, Norwegian filmmaker and actress
- March 11
  - David Anders, American actor
  - Matthias Schweighöfer, German actor and filmmaker
- March 12 - Lisa Durupt, Canadian actress
- March 13 - Kiruna Stamell, Australian-British actress
- March 17 - Nicky Jam, American singer and actor
- March 18 - Chris Geere, English actor
- March 20 - Jake Hoffman, American actor and writer
- March 21 - Rini Bell, American actress
- March 22 - Tiffany Dupont, American actress
- March 23 - Luciana Carro, Canadian actress
- March 24 - Philip Winchester, American actor
- March 27 - Quim Gutiérrez, Spanish actor
- March 28 – Julia Stiles, American actress
- March 29
  - Alexander Fehling, German actor
  - Alain Moussi, Canadian-Gabonese actor and stuntman
- March 30 - Katy Mixon, American actress
- March 31
  - Ryan Bingham, American singer-songwriter and actor
  - Ryōko Shintani, Japanese voice actress
- April 1 - Hannah Spearritt, English actress and singer
- April 6
  - Eliza Coupe, American actress and comedian
  - Niko Nicotera, German-born American actor
- April 8 - Taylor Kitsch, Canadian actor and model
- April 9 - Moran Atias, Israeli actress
- April 10
  - Laura Bell Bundy, American actress
  - Harry Hadden-Paton, British actor
  - Michael Pitt, American actor
- April 12 - Paul Rust, American actor and comedian
- April 13 – Courtney Peldon, American actress
- April 16 - Russell Harvard, American actor
- April 17 - Charlie Hofheimer, American actor
- April 19
  - Hayden Christensen, Canadian actor
  - Catalina Sandino Moreno, Colombian actress
- April 23 – Gemma Whelan, English actress
- April 24 - Sasha Barrese, American actress
- April 26
  - Mariana Ximenes, Brazilian actress
  - Luke Ford, Canadian-Australian actor
  - Amit Shah, English actor
- April 28
  - Jessica Alba, American actress
  - Toby Leonard Moore, Australian actor
  - Catherine Reitman, Canadian-American actress, producer and writer
- April 29 - Alex Vincent, American actor and writer
- April 30
  - Kunal Nayyar, British actor
  - Emma Pierson, English actress
  - Rose Rollins, American actress
- May 2 – Rina Satō, Japanese voice actress
- May 3 – Natalie Tong, Hong Kong actress and model
- May 4 - Angel Oquendo, American actor
- May 5
  - Danielle Fishel, American actress
  - Farid Kamil, Malaysian actor and film director
- May 8 - Kaan Urgancıoğlu, Turkish actor
- May 10
  - Qurrat Ann Kadwani, American actress
  - Nicky Whelan, Australian actress
- May 11
  - JP Karliak, American actor, voice actor and comedian
  - Austin O'Brien, American actor
  - Terry Pheto, South African actress
- May 12 – Rami Malek, American actor
- May 13 - Ryan Piers Williams, American actor, director and writer
- May 15 – Jamie-Lynn Sigler, American actress
- May 16 - Joseph Morgan, English actor
- May 17 - Cosma Shiva Hagen, American-German actress
- May 18 - Allen Leech, Irish actor
- May 21 - Belladonna, American actress, director and producer
- May 28 – Laura Bailey, American voice actress
- May 29
  - Justin Chon, American actor, director and YouTube personality
  - Anders Holm, American actor, comedian, writer and producer
- June 1
  - Johnny Pemberton, American actor, comedian and podcaster
  - Amy Schumer, American comedian and actress
- June 4 – T.J. Miller, American actor, stand-up comedian, producer and writer
- June 7 – Larisa Oleynik, American actress
- June 9 – Natalie Portman, Israeli-American actress
- June 10 – Jonathan Bennett, American actor
- June 12
  - Jeremy Howard, American actor
  - Malachi Pearson, American actor
- June 13 – Chris Evans, American actor
- June 14 – Chauncey Leopardi, American actor
- June 20 – Alisan Porter, American former actress
- June 23 - Joe Taslim, Indonesian actor and martial artist
- June 26 - Jimmy Ray Bennett, American actor
- June 28 - Jon Watts, American filmmaker
- June 30
  - Tom Burke, English actor
  - John Heffernan, British actor
  - Anna Slotky, American former actress
- July 1 - Amanda Lucas, American retired professional mixed martial artist and actress
- July 3 - Rebecca Honig, American voice actress
- July 4 - Tahar Rahim, French actor
- July 5 - Ryan Hansen, American actor and comedian
- July 13
  - Fran Kranz, American actor and director
  - Michael Mando, Canadian actor
- July 15 - Taylor Kinney, American actor
- July 17 - Michiel Huisman, Dutch actor
- July 21
  - Davide Perino, Italian actor and voice actor
  - Romeo Santos, American singer-songwriter and actor
- July 22 - Josh Lawson, Australian actor and filmmaker
- July 23 - Raphaël Personnaz, French actor
- July 24
  - Mohammed Amer, Palestinian-American stand-up comedian and actor
  - Summer Glau, American actress
  - Sheaun McKinney, American actor
  - Lauren Miller Rogen, American actress, comedian, screenwriter and director
- July 26 - Sarah Burns, American actress and comedian
- July 28 - Neil Casey, American actor, writer and comedian
- July 30 – Lisa Wilhoit, American actress
- July 31 - Eric Lively, American former actor
- August 1 – Taylor Fry, American former child actress
- August 3 – Travis Willingham, American voice actor
- August 4
  - Marques Houston, American singer and actor
  - Meghan, Duchess of Sussex, American former actress and model
  - Valerie LaPointe, American storyboard artist and director
  - Abigail Spencer, American actress
- August 5 - Jesse Williams, American actor, director and producer
- August 6 – Leslie Odom Jr., American actor
- August 8
  - Tongayi Chirisa, Zimbabwean actor and singer
  - Meagan Good, American actress
- August 10 - Jon Prescott, American actor
- August 20
  - Ben Barnes, English actor
  - Ali Liebert, Canadian actress, director and producer
  - Michael Rady, American actor
- August 22
  - Ross Marquand, American impressionist, actor and producer
  - Takumi Saito, Japanese actor
- August 24 – Chad Michael Murray, American actor
- August 25 – Rachel Bilson, American actress
- August 27
  - Patrick J. Adams, Canadian actor
  - Sugar Lyn Beard, Canadian actress and radio personality
- August 29 - Émilie Dequenne, Belgian actress (d. 2025)
- August 31 - Joshua Close, Canadian actor
- September 1
  - Michael Adamthwaite, Canadian actor
  - Boyd Holbrook, American actor
- September 3
  - Evgeniya Brik, Russian actress (d. 2022)
  - David Shae, American actor
- September 4 – Beyoncé Knowles, American singer and actress
- September 8 – Jonathan Taylor Thomas, American actor
- September 9 - Julie Gonzalo, Argentine-American actress
- September 12
  - Jennifer Hudson, American singer and actress
  - Elle LaMont, American actress
- September 14 - Miyavi, Japanese guitarist, singer-songwriter and actor
- September 15
  - Jim Ford, American actor, stuntman, screenwriter and director
  - Ben Schwartz, American actor, voice actor, comedian, writer, director and producer
- September 16
  - Fan Bingbing, Chinese actress, model, producer and singer
  - Alexis Bledel, American actress
- September 17 - Griff Furst, American actor, producer and director
- September 18 - Jennifer Tisdale, American actress and singer
- September 22 - Ashley Eckstein, American actress
- September 23 – Misti Traya, American actress
- September 24
  - Yuki Matsuzaki, Japanese actor
  - Fernanda Urrejola, Chilean actress
- September 26 – Christina Milian, American singer and actress
- September 29 – Shay Astar, American singer and actress
- September 30 – Ashleigh Aston Moore, American-Canadian former child actress (d. 2007)
- October 1 – Rupert Friend, English actor
- October 3
  - Seth Gabel, American actor
  - Giselle Itié, Mexican-born Brazilian actress
- October 9 – Zachery Ty Bryan, American actor
- October 12
  - Tom Guiry, American actor
  - Brian J. Smith, American actor
- October 15 - Brandon Jay McLaren, Canadian actor
- October 17 - Liam Garrigan, English actor
- October 18 – Graham Moore, American screenwriter
- October 22 – Michael Fishman, American actor
- October 23 - Jackie Long, American actor, writer, musician, director and producer
- October 25 - Josh Henderson, American actor and singer
- October 30
  - Fiona Dourif, American actress and producer
  - Steve Peacocke, Australian actor
  - Shaun Sipos, Canadian actor
- November 1 - Matt Jones, American actor, voice artist, comedian, rapper and singer
- November 2 - Katharine Isabelle, Canadian actress
- November 6 – Lee Dong-wook, South Korean actor
- November 7 - Lotta Losten, Swedish actress
- November 8 - Azura Skye, American actress
- November 9 – Scottie Thompson, American actress
- November 10 – Perla Liberatori, Italian voice actress
- November 14 - Vanessa Bayer, American actress
- November 15 - Sammy Sheik, Egyptian-American actor
- November 16
  - Caitlin Glass, American voice actress
  - Kate Miller-Heidke, Australian singer-songwriter and actress
- November 17 - Bojana Novakovic, Serbian-Australian actress
- November 18
  - Nasim Pedrad, Iranian-American comedian and actress
  - Christina Vidal, American actress and singer
- November 20 – Andrea Riseborough, English actress
- November 23 - John Lavelle, American actor and playwright
- November 25 - Amy Seimetz, American actress and filmmaker
- November 30 - Jake Szymanski, American actor, writer, director and producer
- December 2 – Britney Spears, American singer and actress
- December 3
  - Maddy Curley, American actress
  - Liza Lapira, American actress
- December 5
  - Adan Canto, Mexican actor (d. 2024)
  - Lydia Leonard, British actress
- December 8 - Dov Tiefenbach, Canadian actor and musician
- December 13 – Amy Lee, American singer-songwriter (Evanescence)
- December 15
  - Michelle Dockery, English actress
  - Brendan Fletcher, Canadian actor, screenwriter and producer
  - Victoria Summer, English actress, model and singer
- December 16 – Krysten Ritter, American actress
- December 22 - Nicolas Vaporidis, Italian actor
- December 27
  - Emilie de Ravin, Australian actress
  - Jay Ellis, American actor
- December 28 – Sienna Miller, English actress
- December 29 - Charlotte Riley, English actress
- December 30
  - Gina Beck, British actress and singer
  - Leila Farzad, British actress

== Deaths ==
| Month | Date | Name | Age | Country | Profession | Notable films |
|---|---|---|---|---|---|---|
| January | 10 | Katharine Alexander | 82 | US | Actress | Enchanted April; John Loves Mary |
| January | 10 | Richard Boone | 63 | US | Actor | The Tall T; Hombre |
| January | 11 | Beulah Bondi | 91 | US | Actress | It's a Wonderful Life; Mr. Smith Goes to Washington |
| January | 12 | Isobel Elsom | 87 | UK | Actress | My Fair Lady; The Unseen |
| January | 16 | Bernard Lee | 73 | UK | Actor | Dr. No; Goldfinger |
| January | 21 | Allyn Joslyn | 79 | US | Actor | The Jazz Singer; Heaven Can Wait |
| February | 1 | Wanda Hendrix | 52 | US | Actress | Prince of Foxes; Captain Carey, U.S.A. |
| February | 2 | Louise Lorraine | 76 | US | Actress | The Adventures of Tarzan; Near the Rainbow's End |
| February | 4 | Mario Camerini | 85 | Italy | Director, Screenwriter | Ulysses; Like the Leaves |
| February | 11 | Ketti Frings | 71 | US | Screenwriter | Come Back, Little Sheba; Foxfire |
| February | 12 | Jean Dixon | 84 | US | Actress | My Man Godfrey; Holiday |
| February | 21 | Bernard B. Brown | 82 | US | Sound Engineer, Composer | The Wolf Man; Shadow of a Doubt |
| February | 21 | Ron Grainer | 58 | Australia | Composer | The Mouse on the Moon; To Sir, with Love |
| February | 22 | Curtis Bernhardt | 81 | Germany | Director | A Stolen Life; Possessed |
| February | 28 | Virginia Huston | 55 | US | Actress | Out of the Past; Tarzan's Peril |
| February | 28 | Robert L. Wolfe | 52 | US | Film Editor | All the President's Men; On Golden Pond |
| March | 4 | Torin Thatcher | 76 | UK | Actor | Houdini; Witness for the Prosecution |
| March | 5 | Brenda de Banzie | 71 | UK | Actress | Hobson's Choice; The Man Who Knew Too Much |
| March | 6 | E.Y. Harburg | 84 | US | Lyricist | The Wizard of Oz; Gay Purr-ee |
| March | 14 | Eleanor Perry | 66 | US | Screenwriter | David and Lisa; Diary of a Mad Housewife |
| March | 15 | René Clair | 82 | France | Director, Screenwriter | It Happened Tomorrow; I Married a Witch |
| March | 17 | Dorothy Dwan | 74 | US | Actress | Kid Speed; The Wizard of Oz |
| March | 27 | Oliver A. Unger | 66 | US | Producer | Force 10 from Navarone; Sandy the Seal |
| March | 31 | Hank Henry | 74 | US | Actor | Pal Joey; Robin and the 7 Hoods |
| April | 7 | Norman Taurog | 82 | US | Director | Skippy; Boys Town |
| April | 14 | Sergio Amidei | 76 | Italy | Screenwriter | Shoeshine; Paisan |
| April | 26 | Madge Evans | 71 | US | Actress | Pennies from Heaven; Army Girl |
| April | 26 | Jim Davis | 71 | US | Actor | The Big Sky; The Maverick Queen |
| April | 26 | Herb Voland | 62 | US | Actor | Another Nice Mess; With Six You Get Eggroll |
| May | 1 | Marlin Skiles | 74 | US | Composer, Musical Director | Gilda; Tonight and Every Night |
| May | 9 | Margaret Lindsay | 70 | US | Actress | The House of the Seven Gables; Jezebel |
| May | 17 | Hugo Friedhofer | 80 | US | Composer | The Best Years of Our Lives; An Affair to Remember |
| May | 18 | Richard Hale | 88 | US | Actor | Friendly Persuasion; To Kill a Mockingbird |
| May | 18 | Arthur O'Connell | 73 | US | Actor | Anatomy of a Murder; Picnic |
| May | 22 | Boris Sagal | 57 | Ukraine | Director | The Omega Man; Girl Happy |
| May | 23 | George Jessel | 83 | US | Actor, Producer | Beau James; Nightmare Alley |
| May | 28 | Henry Blanke | 79 | US | Producer | The Treasure of the Sierra Madre; The Nun's Story |
| June | 5 | Miguel Torres | 81 | Mexico | Director | The Mad Empress; Pancho Villa Returns |
| June | 9 | Russell Hayden | 68 | US | Actor | Trail of the Mounties; Seven Were Saved |
| June | 10 | Jenny Maxwell | 39 | US | Actress | Blue Hawaii; Take Her, She's Mine |
| June | 12 | Eleanor Hunt | 71 | US | Actress | Blue Steel; Yellow Cargo |
| June | 12 | Evalyn Knapp | 74 | US | Actress | The Perils of Pauline; His Private Secretary |
| June | 17 | Lou Forbes | 78 | US | Composer | Intermezzo; Brewster's Millions |
| June | 19 | Alfred Santell | 85 | US | Director | Rebecca of Sunnybrook Farm; Internes Can't Take Money |
| June | 22 | Lola Lane | 75 | US | Actress | Four Daughters; Hollywood Hotel |
| June | 23 | Zarah Leander | 74 | Sweden | Actress | The Blue Fox; Back Then |
| July | 1 | George Voskovec | 76 | Czech Republic | Actor | 12 Angry Men; The Spy Who Came in from the Cold |
| July | 2 | Edward Killy | 78 | US | Director | West of the Pecos; Wagon Train |
| July | 3 | Ross Martin | 61 | Poland | Actor | The Great Race; Experiment in Terror |
| July | 7 | Keefe Brasselle | 58 | US | Actor | The Eddie Cantor Story; A Place in the Sun |
| July | 20 | Dale Hennesy | 54 | US | Production Designer, Art Director | Fantastic Voyage; Annie |
| July | 25 | Gerardo de Leon | 67 | Philippines | Director, Actor | The Moises Padilla Story; Fe, Esperanza, Caridad |
| July | 27 | William Wyler | 79 | Germany | Director, Producer | Ben-Hur; Roman Holiday |
| August | 1 | Paddy Chayefsky | 58 | US | Screenwriter | Network; Marty |
| August | 4 | Melvyn Douglas | 80 | US | Actor | Being There; Hud |
| August | 12 | Shirley Grey | 79 | US | Actress | Texas Cyclone; Girl in Danger |
| August | 16 | Robert Krasker | 68 | Australia | Cinematographer | The Third Man; El Cid |
| August | 18 | Anita Loos | 93 | US | Screenwriter | The Women; I Married an Angel |
| August | 19 | Jessie Matthews | 74 | UK | Actress, Singer | There Goes the Bride; It's Love Again |
| August | 21 | Eddie Byrne | 70 | Ireland | Actor | Star Wars; Island of Terror |
| August | 30 | Vera-Ellen | 60 | US | Actress, Dancer | White Christmas; On the Town |
| September | 1 | Ann Harding | 79 | US | Actress | Holiday; It Happened on Fifth Avenue |
| September | 6 | Maria Palmer | 64 | Austria | Actress | Lady on a Train; The Web |
| September | 11 | Frank McHugh | 83 | US | Actor | Going My Way; Manpower |
| September | 15 | Sara Haden | 81 | US | Actress | The Shop Around the Corner; The Bishop's Wife |
| September | 22 | Harry Warren | 87 | US | Composer | 42nd Street; Hello, Frisco, Hello |
| September | 23 | Chief Dan George | 82 | Canada | Actor | Little Big Man; The Outlaw Josey Wales |
| September | 24 | Patsy Kelly | 71 | US | Actress | The Cowboy and the Lady; Rosemary's Baby |
| September | 27 | Robert Montgomery | 77 | US | Actor, Director | Here Comes Mr. Jordan; Night Must Fall |
| October | 4 | Dorothy Dare | 70 | US | Actress | Clothes and the Woman; High Hat |
| October | 5 | Gloria Grahame | 54 | US | Actress | In a Lonely Place; The Bad and the Beautiful |
| October | 15 | Frank de Kova | 71 | US | Actor | The Ten Commandments; The Mechanic |
| October | 19 | Nils Asther | 84 | Denmark | Actor | The Bitter Tea of General Yen; Bluebeard |
| October | 24 | Edith Head | 83 | US | Costume Designer | Roman Holiday; The Sting |
| October | 26 | Glenn Anders | 92 | US | Actor | The Lady from Shanghai; M |
| November | 2 | Ghislain Cloquet | 57 | France | Cinematographer | Tess; The Young Girls of Rochefort |
| November | 3 | Jean Eustache | 42 | France | Director | The Mother and the Whore; My Little Loves |
| November | 12 | William Holden | 63 | US | Actor | Stalag 17; Sunset Boulevard |
| November | 16 | Morgan Conway | 78 | US | Actor | Dick Tracy; Jack London |
| November | 21 | Ejner Federspiel | 85 | Denmark | Actor | Ordet; Story of Barbara |
| November | 21 | Harry von Zell | 75 | US | Actor | The Saxon Charm; Son of Paleface |
| November | 25 | Jack Albertson | 74 | US | Actor | The Subject Was Roses; Willy Wonka & the Chocolate Factory |
| November | 27 | Lotte Lenya | 83 | Austria | Actress | From Russia with Love; The Threepenny Opera |
| November | 29 | Natalie Wood | 43 | US | Actress | West Side Story; Rebel Without a Cause |
| November | 30 | Robert H. Harris | 70 | US | Actor | How to Make a Monster; Valley of the Dolls |
| December | 5 | Charles Barton | 79 | US | Director | Africa Screams; The Shaggy Dog |
| December | 15 | Karl Struss | 95 | US | Cinematographer | Sunrise: A Song of Two Humans; The Great Dictator |
| December | 17 | Ada Kramm | 82 | Norway | Actress | The White God; Arven |
| December | 27 | Hoagy Carmichael | 82 | US | Actor, Composer | To Have and Have Not; The Best Years of Our Lives |
| December | 28 | Allan Dwan | 96 | Canada | Director | Sands of Iwo Jima; Heidi |

== Film debuts ==
- Ben Affleck – The Dark End of the Street
- Jason Alexander – The Burning
- Christina Applegate – Jaws of Satan
- Javier Bardem – El poderoso influjo de la luna
- Kim Basinger – Hard Country
- Michelle Bauer – Bad Girls
- Xander Berkeley – Mommie Dearest
- Kenneth Branagh – Chariots of Fire
- Rodger Bumpass – Heavy Metal
- Robert John Burke – The Chosen
- Gabriel Byrne – Excalibur
- James Cameron (director) – Piranha II: The Spawning
- Bruce Campbell – The Evil Dead
- Jeffrey Combs – Honky Tonk Freeway
- Kevin Costner – Malibu Hot Summer
- Tom Cruise – Endless Love
- Charles Dance – For Your Eyes Only
- Jeff Daniels – Ragtime
- Robert Davi – Gangster Wars
- Dana Delany – The Fan
- Loretta Devine – Will
- Dennis Farina – Thief
- Nicholas Farrell – Chariots of Fire
- Colin Friels – Hoodwink
- Stephen Fry – Chariots of Fire
- Lee Garlington – King of the Mountain
- Gina Gershon – Beatlemania: The Movie
- Jami Gertz – Endless Love
- Bob Gunton – Rollover
- James Handy – Taps
- Anthony Head – Lady Chatterley's Lover
- Glenne Headly – Four Friends
- Ciarán Hinds – Excalibur
- Ticky Holgado – Les surdoués de la première compagnie
- Holly Hunter – The Burning
- John Kapelos – Thief
- Nicky Katt – Underground Aces
- Dan Lauria – C.O.D.
- Ron Lea – Happy Birthday to Me
- Peter MacNicol – Dragonslayer
- John Mahoney – Hudson Taylor
- Rik Mayall – Eye of the Needle
- Maria de Medeiros – Silvestre
- Steve Miner (director) – Friday the 13th Part 2
- Alfred Molina – Raiders of the Lost Ark
- Demi Moore – Choices
- Chris Noth – Waitress!
- Bill Nunn – Sharky's Machine
- Michael O'Neill – Ghost Story
- Sean Penn – Taps
- Ron Perlman – Quest for Fire
- Ethan Phillips – Ragtime
- Robert Picardo – The Howling
- Martha Plimpton – Rollover
- Amanda Plummer – Cattle Annie and Little Britches
- Jon Polito – Gangster Wars
- Geoffrey Rush – Hoodwink
- Meg Ryan – Rich and Famous
- Kôichi Satô – The Gate of Youth
- Dwight Schultz – The Fan
- Glenn Shadix – The Postman Always Rings Twice
- Vinessa Shaw – Home Sweet Home
- Mindy Sterling – The Devil and Max Devlin
- Fisher Stevens – The Burning
- Madeleine Stowe – Gangster Wars
- Barbara Sukowa – Lola
- Henry Thomas – Raggedy Man
- Frank C. Turner – Silence of the North
- Kathleen Turner – Body Heat
- Reginald VelJohnson – Wolfen
- Diane Venora – Wolfen
- Rachel Ward – Night School
- Denzel Washington – Carbon Copy
- Vernon Wells – Mad Max 2
- Celia Weston – Honky Tonk Freeway
- Amanda Wyss – Force: Five
