= La Bête (film) =

1975 French film by Walerian Borowczyk

The Beast
- Official teaser poster
- Directed by: Walerian Borowczyk
- Written by: Walerian Borowczyk
- Produced by: Anatole Dauman
- Starring: Sirpa Lane; Lisbeth Hummel; Marcel Dalio
- Cinematography: Bernard Daillencourt; Marcel Grignon
- Edited by: Walerian Borowczyk
- Production company: Argos Films
- Distributed by: Argos Films
- Release date: 6 January 1975
- Running time: 98 minutes
- Country: France

The Beast (French: La Bête) is a 1975 French erotic horror film written, edited, and directed by Walerian Borowczyk. The film was noted for its explicit sexual content, including teratophilia (attraction to monsters), upon its initial release. It has become a cult film.

A loose adaptation of the novella Lokis by Prosper Mérimée was originally conceived in 1972 as a film on its own. However, Borowczyk later rendered Lokis as a story (La véritable histoire de la bête du Gévaudan) in Immoral Tales (1974), which was envisaged to be a film of six stories. After Immoral Tales was remastered as a film of four stories, the footage became the dream sequence of The Beast.

== Plot ==
Businessman Philip Broadhurst dies and leaves his estate to his daughter, Lucy, on the condition that she marries Mathurin, Marquis Pierre de l'Esperance's son, within six months. She is to be married by Cardinal Joseph de Balo, the brother of Pierre's uncle, the crippled Duc Rammaendelo de Balo, who shares their crumbling farmhouse with Pierre's daughter Clarisse, and their servant Ifany.

Mathurin, who manages the family horse-breeding business, is dim-witted and deformed and has never been baptized. Pierre summons the local priest to the house for the baptism, but Pierre, by promising the priest repairs to his church and a new bell, performs the ritual himself so that the priest will not find out the truth about Mathurin.

Lucy and her aunt, Virginia, are driven by their chauffeur toward the farm, but a fallen tree blocks their way. They find a back route to the house at a back door to the house, where Lucy asks Rammaendelo about rumors. Rammaendelo, who is not in favor of the marriage because he is dependent on Mathurin to look after him, shows her a book that describes the beautiful Romilda's fight with a beast in the local forest 200 years ago. Lucy comes across several drawings depicting bestiality and becomes sexually excited at the thought of her impending marriage, even though she has never met Mathurin.

Pierre blackmails Rammaendelo into persuading his brother to perform the marriage by telling him that he has proof that Rammaendelo poisoned his wife. Rammaendelo cannot get through to the Cardinal on the telephone, so Pierre sends a telegram, assuring him that Mathurin has been baptized and urging him to attend this evening.

Everyone assembles for dinner, and Mathurin's uncouth manners become apparent. Lucy and her aunt try to leave but are persuaded to stay. With everyone having drunk too much wine, most of the assembly falls asleep while waiting for the Cardinal. Lucy retires to her room, undresses, puts on her thin wedding dress, and dreams that she is Romilda, playing the harpsichord. Seeing a lamb straying into the forest, she chases after it to find that it has been torn apart by a black hairy beast.

Pierre overhears Rammaendelo on the telephone with the Cardinal trying to dissuade him from performing the marriage. Angrily interrupting the conversation, Pierre slits Rammaendelo's throat with a razor and tears the phone out of the wall. In the ensuing comic dream sequence, the beast with a large visible erection chases Lucy through the forest. She loses most of her clothing in the process and ends up hanging by her arms from a branch, and the beast sexually assaults her and masturbates. Lucy wakes up in a sweat and wonders if it was merely a dream. She tiptoes to Mathurin's room, but he is asleep, fully clothed, on his bed. Lucy returns to her room, masturbates, and dreams that the beast is copulating with her. She wakes again and is convinced that Mathurin must have visited her. She visits his room again, but he is still sleeping soundly.

Lucy returns to her dream. The beast continues to masturbate, and Lucy rubs his ejaculate all over herself. Eventually, the beast dies of exhaustion. Lucy wakes and walks into Mathurin's room to find him dead on the floor. She runs naked through the house screaming, and everyone runs to her aid. Virginia examines Mathurin's body and discovers that a plaster cast on his arm conceals a claw for a hand. Pulling his clothes off reveals that he is covered in thick black hair and has a tail, indicating that he is a descendant of Romilda and the beast. They run out of the house in terror as the Cardinal arrives. Virginia comforts the terrified Lucy as they speed away in the car, and Lucy dreams that she is naked in the forest again, this time burying the beast.

== Cast ==
- Sirpa Lane as Romilda de l'Esperance
- Lisbeth Hummel as Lucy Broadhurst
- Elisabeth Kaza as Virginia Broadhurst
- Pierre Benedetti as Mathurin de l'Esperance
- Guy Tréjan as Pierre de l'Esperance
- Roland Armontel as Priest
- Marcel Dalio as Rammondelo, Duke of Balo
- Robert Capia as Roberto Capia
- Pascale Rivault as Clarisse de l'Esperance

== Release ==
The film premiered on 6 January 1975 at the Avoriaz Fantastic Film Festival and was released theatrically in Germany on 6 February 1981.

== Reception ==
The film did well in Europe, but the run of the film in France and the U.S. ran into controversy due to its erotic nature. Many felt the film went over the top with its sex scenes, and some people said that the movie had a connection to bestiality, leading to its withdrawal from film for several years. In the UK the BBFC refused to classify a heavily cut version for general cinema release, and the same cut print narrowly avoided prosecution under the Obscene Publications Act by the Director of Public Prosecutions when it was shown with Greater London Council approval at the independently run Prince Charles Cinema in London in September 1978. On the review aggregator website Rotten Tomatoes, 68% of 22 critics' reviews are positive, with an average rating of 5.8/10.

The film has been described as a classic for the monster erotica culture, and as a memorable and polemic monster porn movie. Some teratophiles have said that this movie opened doors for the genre of monster erotica, and inspired movies like: Possession (1981) and The Untamed (2016), both movies that contain explicit sexual encounters with monsters, aliens, and mythological beings.
