= Patrick Magee (actor) =

Northern Irish actor (1922–1982)

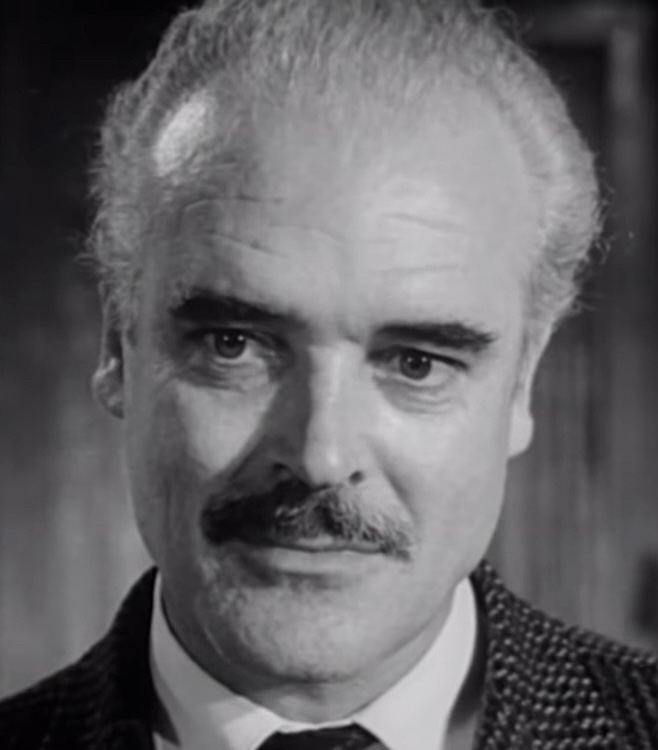
- Magee in Dementia 13 (1963)
- Born: Patrick George McGee; 31 March 1922; Armagh, County Armagh, Northern Ireland
- Died: 14 August 1982 (aged 60); Fulham, London, England
- Other name: Pat Magee
- Education: St Patrick's Grammar School, Armagh
- Occupations: Actor; stage director
- Years active: 1959–1982
- Spouse: Belle Sherry (m. 1958)
- Children: 2
- Awards: Tony Award for Best Featured Actor in a Play; 1966 Marat/Sade

Patrick George Magee (né McGee, 31 March 1922 – 14 August 1982) was an Irish actor and theatre director. He was noted for his collaborations with playwrights Samuel Beckett and Harold Pinter (being sometimes described as "Beckett's favourite actor") as well as for creating the role of the Marquis de Sade in the original stage and screen productions of Marat/Sade.

Known for his distinctive voice, he also appeared in numerous horror films and in two Stanley Kubrick films – A Clockwork Orange (1971) and Barry Lyndon (1975) – and three Joseph Losey films – The Criminal (1960), The Servant (1963) and Galileo (1975). He was a member of the Royal Shakespeare Company from 1964 to 1970.

After Magee's death, critic Antonia Quirke described him as "a presence so full of strangeness and charisma and difference and power", while scholar Conor Carville wrote that Magee was an "avant-garde bad-boy" and a "very important and unjustly forgotten figure who represents an important aspect of the cultural ferment of the 1960s and 1970s in Britain".

== Early life ==
McGee (he changed the spelling of his surname to Magee when he began performing, most likely to avoid confusion with another actor) was born into a middle-class Catholic family at 2 Edward Street, Armagh, County Armagh. The eldest of five children, he was educated at St. Patrick's Grammar School.

== Career ==
=== Stage ===
His first stage experience in Ireland was with Anew McMaster's touring company, performing the works of Shakespeare. It was here that he first worked with Pinter. He was then brought to London by Tyrone Guthrie for a series of Irish plays. He met Beckett in 1957 and soon recorded passages from the novel, Molloy, and the short story, From an Abandoned Work, for BBC radio. Impressed by "the cracked quality of Magee's distinctly Irish voice," Beckett requested copies of the tapes and wrote Krapp's Last Tape especially for the actor. First produced at the Royal Court Theatre in London on 28 October 1958, the play starred Magee, directed by Donald McWhinnie. A televised version with Magee directed by McWhinnie was later broadcast by BBC2 on 29 November 1972. Beckett's biographer Anthony Cronin wrote that "there was a sense in which, as an actor, he had been waiting for Beckett as Beckett had been waiting for him."

In 1964, he joined the Royal Shakespeare Company, after Pinter, directing his own play The Birthday Party, specifically requested him for the role of McCann, and stated he was the strongest in the cast. In 1965 he portrayed the Marquis de Sade in Peter Brook's production of Peter Weiss' Marat/Sade, and when the play transferred to Broadway he won a Tony Award for Best Featured Actor in a Play. He also appeared in the 1966 RSC production of Staircase opposite Paul Scofield. In 1969, he played Inspector Hawkins in the RSC's original production of Dutch Uncle. His last play with the company was Battle of Shrivings in 1970, at the Lyric Theatre, under the direction of Peter Hall.

In 1970, he played Daniel Webster in Scratch, a Broadway adaptation of The Devil and Daniel Webster by Archibald MacLean.

=== Film and television ===
Early film roles included Joseph Losey's The Criminal (1960) Dementia 13 (1963) and The Servant (1963), the latter an adaptation scripted by Pinter. He also appeared as Surgeon-Major Reynolds in Zulu (1964), Séance on a Wet Afternoon (1964), Anzio (1968), and in the film versions of Marat/Sade (1967; as de Sade) and The Birthday Party (1968). He is perhaps best known for his role as the victimised writer Frank Alexander, who tortures Alex DeLarge with Beethoven's music, in Stanley Kubrick's film A Clockwork Orange (1971). His other role for Kubrick was as Redmond Barry's mentor, the Chevalier de Balibari, in Barry Lyndon (1975). He reprised his role as the Marquis de Sade in the 1966 film adaptation of Marat/Sade, also directed by Peter Brook.

Magee also appeared in King Lear (1971), Young Winston (1972), The Final Programme (1973), Galileo (1975), Sir Henry at Rawlinson End (1980) and Chariots of Fire (1981), but was most often seen in horror films. These included the early Francis Ford Coppola outing Dementia 13 (1963), Roger Corman's The Masque of Red Death (1964), and the Boris Karloff vehicle Die, Monster, Die! (1965) for AIP; The Skull (1965), Tales from the Crypt (1972), Asylum (1972), and And Now the Screaming Starts! (1973) for Amicus Productions; Demons of the Mind (1972) for Hammer Film Productions; Lucio Fulci's The Black Cat (1981), and Walerian Borowczyk's Docteur Jekyll et les femmes (1981), which proved his final film role.

== Personal life ==
Magee married Belle Sherry, also a native of County Armagh, in 1958. The couple had two children, twins Mark and Caroline (b. February 1961), and remained together until Magee's death.

He was known as something of a "hellraiser." He often struggled with bouts of alcoholism and gambling that adversely affected his finances, and his professional relationships.

He was a staunch Irish republican, and an active campaigner for left-wing social and political causes. In 1976, he played an instrumental role in persuading his trade union Equity to boycott South Africa over the country's apartheid laws.

== Death ==
A heavy drinker, Magee died from a heart attack at his flat in Fulham, southwest London, on 14 August 1982, at the age of 60, according to obituaries in The Glasgow Herald and The New York Times. His final role was in an episode of Play for Today which aired on 14 December 1982, three months after his death.

== Legacy ==
Conor Carville, of the University of Reading, wrote of Magee:

"[Magee] is a very important and unjustly forgotten figure who represents an important aspect of the cultural ferment of the 1960s and 1970s in Britain. The persona he had off-stage was that of a hell raiser, and this blended into the roles he was cast in. He was at the forefront of theatrical and cinematic experiment of the time, and yet, as a BBC stalwart on both radio and TV and a West End actor, he was also ensconced in the mainstream. As well as this, his immersion in the new British horror genre meant he moved in underground circles. My research has revealed an undercurrent of desperation in his career, as he took on such roles for the income they provided. It is this multifaced character that makes Magee a lightning rod for the tensions and contradictions of his era."

On 29 July 2017, actor Stephen Rea, who appeared alongside Patrick Magee in a production of Samuel Beckett's play Endgame, unveiled a blue plaque commemorating Magee's birthplace at 2 Edward Street, Armagh.

In a retrospective written on what would have been the actor's 100th birthday in 2022 on Senses of Cinema, Mark Lager particularly praised Patrick Magee as the character Krapp in Samuel Beckett's Krapp's Last Tape and as the character McCann in Harold Pinter's The Birthday Party as the best performances of his career, while also considering his character of the blind patient George Carter in Freddie Francis's Tales from the Crypt as his most memorable of many performances in horror films.

== Partial stage credits ==
| Year | Title | Role | Director | Original venue | Notes | Ref. |
|---|---|---|---|---|---|---|
| 1948 | Mountain Post | Maton | R.H. MacCandless | Ulster Group Theatre, Belfast | | |
| 1949 | Bannister's Cafe | Walter Bannister | Himself | Ulster Group Theatre, Belfast | Also director | |
| 1950 | The Square Peg | Reverend Alexander McCrea | Himself | Ulster Group Theatre, Belfast | Also director | |
| 1951 | The Passing Day | Hind | Tyrone Guthrie | Ambassadors Theatre, London | Credited as 'Pat Magee' | |
| 1955–56 | The Queen and the Rebels | Peasant | Frank Hauser | Theatre Royal Haymarket, London | | |
| 1956 | The Shadow of a Gunman | Adolphus Gregson | John Gibson | New Lindsey Theatre Club, London | | |
| 1958 | Krapp's Last Tape | Krapp | Donald McWhinnie | Royal Court Theatre, London | | |
| 1959 | The Buskers | Max | Toby Robertson | Arts Theatre, London | | |
| 1959–60 | Rosmersholm | | George Devine | Royal Court Theatre, London | | |
| 1961 | Progress to the Park | Mr. Laughlin | Ted Kotcheff | Grand Theatre, Blackpool | | |
| 1961 | A Whistle in the Dark | Michael Carney Sr. | Edward Burnham | Theatre Royal Stratford East, London | For Theatre Workshop | |
| 1964 | The Birthday Party | McCann | Harold Pinter | Aldwych Theatre, London | For Royal Shakespeare Company | |
| 1964 | Afore Night Come | Roche | Clifford Williams | Aldwych Theatre, London | For Royal Shakespeare Company | |
| 1964 | Endgame | Hamm | Donald McWhinnie | Aldwych Theatre, London | For Royal Shakespeare Company | |
| 1964 | Marat/Sade | Marquis de Sade | Peter Brook | Aldwych Theatre, London | For Royal Shakespeare Company | |
| 1965 | Mr Puntila and his Man Matti | Matti Altonen | Michel Saint-Denis | Aldwych Theatre, London | For Royal Shakespeare Company | |
| 1965 | Hamlet | Ghost of Old Denmark | Peter Hall | Royal Shakespeare Theatre, Stratford-upon-Avon | For Royal Shakespeare Company | |
| 1965 | Marat/Sade | Marquis de Sade | Peter Brook | Aldwych Theatre, London | For Royal Shakespeare Company | |
| 1965–66 | Marat/Sade | Marquis de Sade | Peter Brook | Martin Beck Theatre, New York City | Won Tony Award for Best Featured Actor in a Play | |
| 1966 | The Meteor | Wolfgang Schwitter | Clifford Williams | Aldwych Theatre, London | For Royal Shakespeare Company | |
| 1966 | Staircase | Harry Leeds | Peter Hall | Theatre Royal, Brighton | For Royal Shakespeare Company | |
| 1966 | Staircase | Harry Leeds | Peter Hall | Aldwych Theatre, London | For Royal Shakespeare Company | |
| 1966–67 | Marat/Sade | Marquis de Sade | Donald Driver | Majestic Theatre, Broadway | | |
| 1967 | Keep It in the Family | Frank Brady | Allan Davis | Plymouth Theatre, Broadway | | |
| 1969 | Dutch Uncle | Inspector Hawkins | Peter Hall | Theatre Royal, Brighton | For Royal Shakespeare Company | |
| 1969 | Dutch Uncle | Inspector Hawkins | Peter Hall | Aldwych Theatre, London | For Royal Shakespeare Company | |
| 1970 | Battle of Shrivings | Mark | Peter Hall | Lyric Theatre, London | For Royal Shakespeare Company | |
| 1971 | Scratch | Daniel Webster | Peter Hunt | St. James Theatre, Broadway | | |
| 1974 | The Master Builder | Halvard Solness | Himself | Thorndike Theatre, Leatherhead | Also director | |
| 1975–76 | The White Devil | Monticelso | Michael Lindsay-Hogg | The Old Vic, London | | |
| 1976 | That Time | | Donald McWhinnie | Royal Court Theatre, London | | |
| 1980 | Doctor Faustus | Mephistopheles | Christopher Fettes | Lyric Hammersmith Theatre, London | | |
| 1980 | Doctor Faustus | Mephistopheles | Christopher Fettes | Fortune Theatre, London | | |

== Filmography ==
=== Film ===
| Year | Title | Role | Notes |
|---|---|---|---|
| 1960 | The Criminal | Barrows | Alternative title: The Concrete Jungle |
| 1961 | Rag Doll | Flynn | Alternative title: Young, Willing and Eager |
| 1961 | Never Back Losers | Ben Black | |
| 1962 | The Boys | Mr Lee | |
| 1962 | A Prize of Arms | RSM Hicks | |
| 1963 | Ricochet | Inspector Cummins | |
| 1963 | The Young Racers | Sir William Dragonet | |
| 1963 | The Very Edge | Simmonds | |
| 1963 | The Servant | Bishop | |
| 1963 | Dementia 13 | Justin Caleb | |
| 1963 | Operation: Titian | Dr. Morisijus | |
| 1964 | Zulu | Surgeon James Henry Reynolds | |
| 1964 | Séance on a Wet Afternoon | Walsh | |
| 1964 | The Masque of the Red Death | Alfredo | |
| 1965 | Portrait in Terror | Mauricio Zaroni | Re-edited version of Operation: Titian |
| 1965 | The Skull | Police Surgeon | |
| 1965 | Die, Monster, Die! | Dr Henderson | Alternative title: Monster of Terror |
| 1966 | Blood Bath | Linda's Husband | Uncredited; re-used footage from Operation: Titian |
| 1967 | Marat/Sade | Marquis de Sade | |
| 1968 | Anzio | Major-General Starkey | |
| 1968 | Decline and Fall... of a Birdwatcher | Lunatic Prisoner | |
| 1968 | The Birthday Party | Shamus McCann | |
| 1969 | Hard Contract | Alexi | |
| 1970 | Cromwell | Hugh Peter | |
| 1970 | You Can't Win 'Em All | Mustafa Kemal Atatürk | |
| 1971 | King Lear | Cornwall | |
| 1971 | The Trojan Women | Menelaus | |
| 1971 | A Clockwork Orange | Frank Alexander | |
| 1972 | Tales from the Crypt | George Carter | Segment: "Blind Alleys" |
| 1972 | The Fiend | Minister | Alternative title: Beware My Brethren |
| 1972 | Asylum | Dr. Rutherford | |
| 1972 | Young Winston | Gen. Bindon Blood | |
| 1972 | Pope Joan | Elder Monk | |
| 1972 | Demons of the Mind | Falkenberg | |
| 1973 | And Now the Screaming Starts! | Dr. Whittle | |
| 1973 | Lady Ice | Paul Booth | |
| 1973 | The Final Programme | Dr. Baxter | Alternative title: The Last Days of Man on Earth |
| 1974 | Luther | Hans Luther | |
| 1974 | Simona | Le père | |
| 1975 | Galileo | Cardinal Bellarmin | |
| 1975 | Barry Lyndon | The Chevalier du Balibari | |
| 1977 | Telefon | Gen. Strelsky | |
| 1979 | The Brontë Sisters | Patrick Brontë | |
| 1980 | Rough Cut | Ernst Mueller | |
| 1980 | The Sleep of Death | Marquis | |
| 1980 | Hawk the Slayer | Priest | |
| 1980 | Sir Henry at Rawlinson End | Reverend Slodden | |
| 1981 | Chariots of Fire | Lord Cadogan | |
| 1981 | The Monster Club | Innkeeper | |
| 1981 | The Black Cat | Prof. Robert Miles | |
| 1981 | Blood of Dr. Jekyll | Gen. William Danvers Carew | Alternative title: The Strange Case of Dr. Jekyll and Miss Osbourne |

=== Television ===
| Year | Title | Role | Notes |
|---|---|---|---|
| 1955–59 | Sunday Night Theatre | Various characters | 5 episodes |
| 1957–63 | ITV Television Playhouse | Various characters | 4 episodes |
| 1958 | Dial 999 | Parsons | Episode: "The Great Gold Robbery" |
| 1959, 1962 | ITV Play of the Week | Michael Davitt, Duncan Bishop | 2 episodes |
| 1960 | Deadline Midnight | Hughes | 1 episode |
| 1960 | BBC Sunday-Night Play | Martin Brodie | Episode: "The Ruffians" |
| 1961 | No Hiding Place | Pete Logan | Episode: "Explosion Underground" |
| 1961 | About Religion | The Lawyer | Episode: "Inquest at Golgotha" |
| 1961 | Armchair Theatre | Mr. Morgan | Episode: "Murder Club" |
| 1961, 1963 | The Edgar Wallace Mystery Theater | Inspector Cummings, Ben Black | 2 episodes |
| 1962 | Z-Cars | Mr. O'Connor | Episode: "Stab in the Dark" |
| 1963 | Moonstrike | Pierre | Episode: "The Escape" |
| 1963 | Zero One | Gallegos | Episode: "Stopover" |
| 1963 | Compact | Silgo | 2 episodes |
| 1963 | The Sentimental Agent | Major | Episode: "Express Delivery" |
| 1963 | The Avengers | Sam "Pancho" Driver, John P. Spagge | 2 episodes |
| 1963–64 | The Plane Makers | William Breen | 2 episodes |
| 1964 | Dixon of Dock Green | Jack Mullen | 2 episodes |
| 1964 | Theatre 625 | Duke of Wellingon | Episode: "Carried by Storm" |
| 1965 | Doctor Finlay's Casebook | James Spalding | Episode: "Beware of the Dog" |
| 1965–73 | BBC Play of the Month | Various characters | 3 episodes |
| 1967–68 | The Wednesday Play | James Player/Arnold Jesse | 2 episodes |
| 1968 | The Champions | Pedraza | Episode: "The Iron Man" |
| 1968 | ITV Playhouse | Philo | Episode: "Neutral Ground" |
| 1973 | The Protectors | Gardner | Episode: "Chase" |
| 1973 | Stage 2 | Adolphus Grigson | Episode: "Shadow of a Gunman" |
| 1973 | Orson Welles Great Mysteries | Sergeant Morris | Episode: "The Monkey's Paw" |
| 1974 | The Adventures of Black Beauty | Corporal Donovan | Episode: "The Last Charge" |
| 1974 | King Lear | King Lear | Miniseries |
| 1974–75 | Thriller | Prof. Marcus Carnaby | 2 episodes |
| 1975 | Quiller | Vamvakaris | Episode: "Mark the File Expendable" |
| 1976 | Beasts | Leo Raymount | Episode: "What Big Eyes" |
| 1977 | Who Pays the Ferryman? | Duncan Neve/Bernard Kingsley | Episode: "The Well" |
| 1978 | Kidnapped | Ebenezer Balfour | 5 episodes |
| 1979–82 | Play for Today | Various characters | 3 episodes |

=== Radio ===
- From an Abandoned Work (radio play by Samuel Beckett) Monologue first broadcast in 1957 by the BBC.
- Hordes of the Things (radio series) 1980 as The Narrator.
- A Modest Proposal by Johnathan Swift - a reading of Swift’s satirical essay (Radio 3 1980)

== Awards and nominations ==
| Award | Year | Category | Work | Result |
|---|---|---|---|---|
| Tony Awards | 1966 | Best Featured Actor in a Play | Marat/Sade | Won |
