= Walerian Borowczyk =

Polish film director (1923–2006)

- Born: 21 October 1923; Kwilcz, Poland
- Died: 3 February 2006 (aged 82); Paris, France
- Occupation: Film director
- Years active: 1946–1988

Walerian Borowczyk (21 October 1923 – 3 February 2006) was a Polish film director described by film critics as a "genius who also happened to be a pornographer". He directed 40 films between 1946 and 1988. Borowczyk settled in Paris in 1959. As a film director, he worked mainly in France.

== Biography ==
Born in Kwilcz near Poznań, Borowczyk studied painting at the Academy of Fine Arts in Kraków, then devoted himself to painting and lithography, including the creation of posters for the cinema, which earned him a national prize in 1953. His early films were surreal animations, some only a few seconds long, including several comic abecedaria. His most acclaimed early films were Był sobie raz (Time Upon a Once) (1957) and Dom (House) (1958, with Jan Lenica).

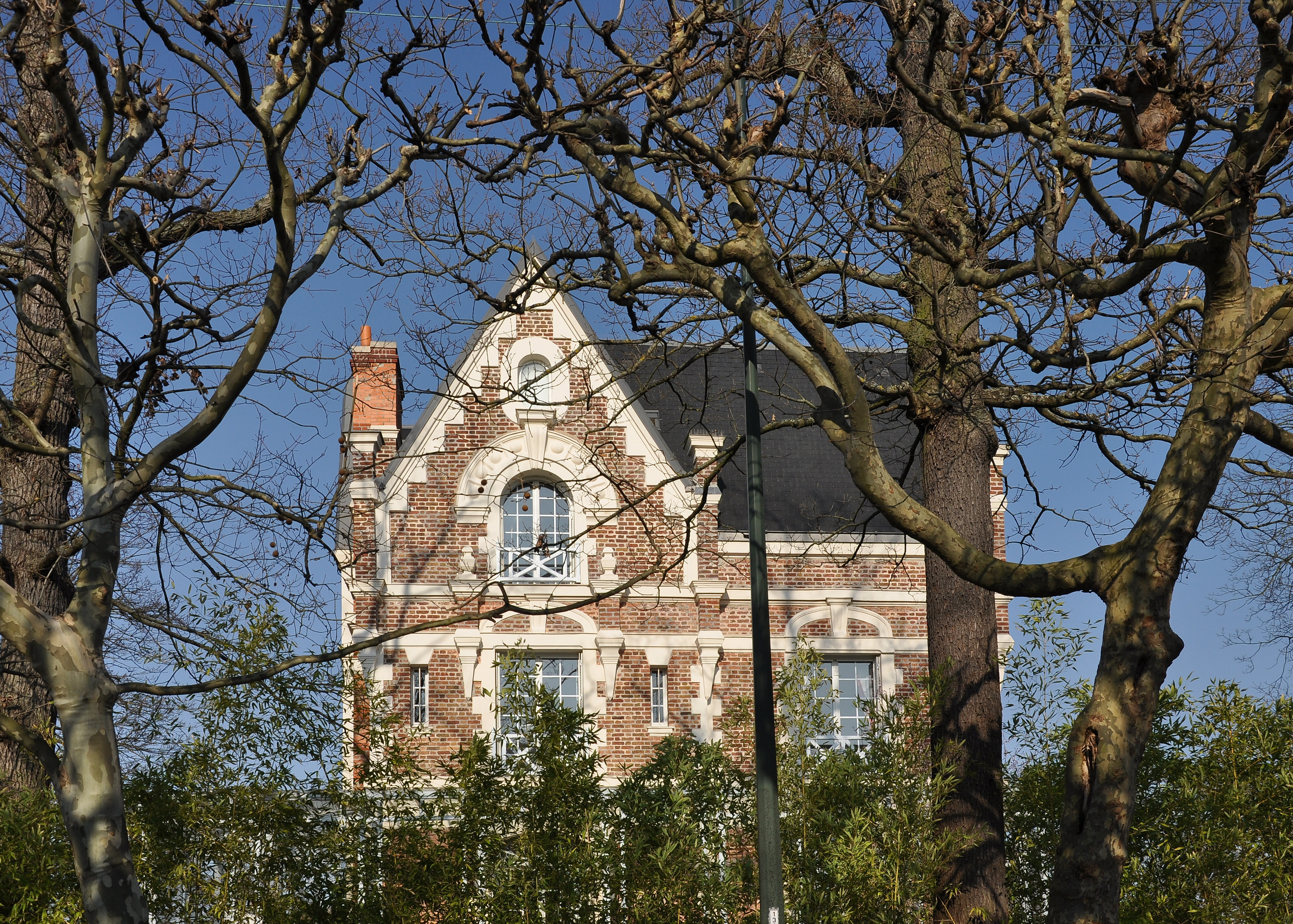
The house in Le Vésinet near Paris where the artist lived his last thirty years

In 1959, Borowczyk immigrated to France and settled in Paris. He worked with Chris Marker for Les Astronautes. Major works of this period include the stop motion film Renaissance (1964), which uses reverse motion to depict various destroyed objects (a prayer book, a stuffed toy, etc.) re-assembling themselves, only to be destroyed again when the last object (a bomb) is complete. In 1967, he directed his first animated feature film, Théâtre de Monsieur & Madame Kabal: un film dessiné pour les adultes (Mr. and Mrs. Kabal's Theatre).

Borowczyk moved into live-action feature film with Goto, l'île d'amour (Goto, Isle of Love) (1968) and Blanche (1971), both tales of illicit love thwarted by jealous husbands, and both starring his own wife, Ligia Branice. One of his most appreciated films of this period, Dzieje grzechu (A Story of Sin) (1975), which was nominated for Palme d'or, is an adaptation of a Polish literary classic by Stefan Żeromski. Like his 1966 short film Rosalie (a Guy de Maupassant adaptation and a Silver Bear winner), Dzieje grzechu had successfully rendered the themes of seduction and infanticide. Contes immoraux (Immoral Tales) (1973) and his later work, including Interno di un convento (Behind Convent Walls) (1977) (inspired by Promenades dans Rome of Stendhal) and Cérémonie d'amour (Rites of Love) (1988) have been controversial, lauded by some for their unique surrealist vision and derided by others as contentless pornography. La Bête (The Beast, 1975) (based on the novel Lokis by Prosper Mérimée and originally conceived in 1972 as a film on its own, but then in 1973 as the fifth story in Contes immoraux) was seen by many as a decline in the director's career after Dzieje grzechu, except in France, where it was hailed by prominent critics such as Ado Kyrou. His 1980 film Lulu was based on the eponymous character created by Frank Wedekind.

In 1981, he made Docteur Jekyll et les femmes (Blood of Dr Jekyll), a version of the Jekyll and Hyde story starring Udo Kier and Patrick Magee and depicting Jekyll's transformation as a violent rebellion against Victorian morality. In his 1988 book Nightmare Movies, Kim Newman described the film as "dark, misanthropic and interestingly offensive". He made a brief return to animation with his 1984 short film Scherzo infernal. In 1987, he directed Emmanuelle 5, an installment of the Emmanuelle series, that was also released in a hardcore video-only version. He was unhappy with the project due to a dispute concerning the casting of lead actress Monique Gabrielle. In 1988 and 1990, he directed four episodes for the series Série rose: Les Chefs d'œuvre de la littérature érotique on M6.

Many of Borowczyk's films use historical settings, including Ars Amandi: l'arte di amare (The Art of Love) (1983), set in the time of Ovid (and featuring the poet as a character); Blanche, set during the Middle Ages; and three of the four episodes in Contes immoraux, set respectively in the nineteenth century, the sixteenth century, and the Borgia papacy.

A number of his films (such as the "tale" La Marée (The Tide) in Contes immoraux, the 1976 La Marge (The Streetwalker), the episode Marceline in Les Héroïnes du mal: Margherita, Marceline, Marie (Immoral Women) (1979), and Cérémonie d'amour) were based on stories by André Pieyre de Mandiargues. A less usual product of this cooperation was Une collection particulière of 1973, a representation of Borowczyk's collection of pornographic items, with Mandiargues having written (and read) the narration.

Borowczyk was the author of three books: "Anatomia diabła" (Anatomy of Devil, published in 1992), "Moje polskie lata" (My Polish Years, published in 2002) and "Co myślę patrząc na rozebraną Polkę" (What Do I Think When I'm Looking at a Nude Polish Woman, published posthumously in 2007).

He died of heart failure in Paris in 2006, aged 82.

== Legacy ==
The nightmarish Jeux des anges (1964, aka The Games of Angels), an expressionist evocation of the horrors of Nazi concentration camps, was selected by Terry Gilliam as one of the ten best animated films of all time.

== Filmography ==
Film

Title	Year	Director	Writer	Other	English Title	Notes
Renesans	1963	Yes	Yes	—N/a	"Renaissance"	
Les Jeux Des Anges	1964	Yes	Yes		"The Game of Angels"	
Théâtre de Monsieur & Madame Kabal	1967	Yes	Yes	Production designer	"Mr. and Mrs. Kabal's Theatre"	
Goto, l'île d'amour	1969	Yes	Yes	—N/a	"Goto, Island of Love"	Songwriter: "L'hymne national de Goto"
Blanche	1972	Yes	Yes	Editor & production designer	"Blanche"	
Contes immoraux	1973	Yes	Yes	Editor & production designer	"Immoral Tales"	
La Bête	1975	Yes	Yes	Editor	"The Beast"	
Dzieje grzechu	1975	Yes	Yes	Actor (role: "Piotr Iwanycz")	"The Story of Sin"	Uncredited role
La Marge	1976	Yes	Yes	—N/a	"The Margin" or "The Streetwalker"	
Interno di un convento	1977	Yes	Yes	Editor	"Behind Convent Walls"	
Les héroïnes du mal	1979	Yes	Yes	—N/a	"Immoral Women"	
Collections privées	1979	Yes	Yes	—N/a	"Private Collections"	Segment: "L'armoire"
Lulu	1980	Yes	Yes	Production designer	"Lulu"	
Docteur Jekyll et les femmes	1981	Yes	Yes	Production designer	"Dr. Jekyll and his Women", "Blood of Dr. Jekyll", "The Strange Case of Dr. Jekyll and Miss Osbourne"	
Ars amandi	1983	Yes	Yes	Editor & cinematographer	"The Art of Love"	
Emmanuelle 5	1987	Yes	Yes	—N/a	"Emmanuelle 5"	
Love Rites	1987	Yes	Yes	—N/a	"Love Rites"	

== Accolades ==
- Nominated: BAFTA Award for Best Animated Film — Dom (1960) (shared with Jan Lenica)
- Won: Special Jury Award for Best Short Film — Le concert de M. et Mme. Kabal (1963)
- Won: Special Mention Award for Best Short Film — Rosalie (1966)
- Won: Silver Berlin Bear for Best Short Film — Rosalie (1966)
- Won: Special Jury Prize — Rosalie (1967)
- Won: Interfilm Award — Théâtre de Monsieur & Madame Kabal (1967)
- Won: Interfilm Grand Prix — Blanche (1972)
- Nominated: Palme d'Or — Dzieje grzechu (1975)
- Won: Maria Award for Best Director — Docteur Jekyll et les femmes (1981)
