= List of French films of 1976 =

A list of films produced in France in 1976.

== Films ==
| Title | Director | Cast | Genre | Notes |
|---|---|---|---|---|
| 1900 | Bernardo Bertolucci | Robert De Niro, Gérard Depardieu, Burt Lancaster | Drama | Italian–French–West German co-production |
| L'Année sainte | Jean Girault | Jean Gabin, Louis de Funès | Comedy | |
| Barocco | André Téchiné | Isabelle Adjani, Gérard Depardieu, Marie-France Pisier | Drama | |
| Bartleby | Maurice Ronet | Michael Lonsdale | Drama | |
| Body of My Enemy | Henri Verneuil | Jean-Paul Belmondo, Bernard Blier, Marie-France Pisier | | |
| Black and White in Color | Jean-Jacques Annaud | Jean Carmet, Jacques Dufilho, Catherine Rouvel | Comedy | |
| The Castaways of Turtle Island | Jacques Rozier | Pierre Richard, Tanya Lopert | | |
| A Child in the Crowd | Gérard Blain | Jean-François Cimino, César Chauveau, Annie Kovacs | Drama | |
| The Choice | Jacques Faber | Claude Jade, Gilles Kohler, Georges Lambert | Drama | |
| Comme un boomerang | José Giovanni | Alain Delon, Carla Gravina, Dora Doll | | French-Italian co-production |
| The Desert of the Tartars | Valerio Zurlini | Vittorio Gassman, Giuliano Gemma, Helmut Griem | | French-Italian-West German co-production |
| Le Diable au cœur | Bernard Queysanne | Jane Birkin, Jacques Spiesser | Drama | |
| Dracula and Son | Édouard Molinaro | Christopher Lee | Comedy, horror | |
| F comme Fairbanks | Maurice Dugowson | Miou-Miou, Patrick Dewaere, Michel Piccoli | | |
| The Good and the Bad | Claude Lelouch | Jacques Dutronc, Marlène Jobert, Brigitte FOssey | | |
| La Grande Récré | Claude Pierson | Paul Préboist, Jacques Préboist | Comedy | |
| Her Venetian Name in Deserted Calcutta | Marguerite Duras | Michael Lonsdale, Delphine Seyrig, Nicole Hiss, Marie-Pierre Thiebaut, Sylvie Nuytten | Drama | |
| The Hunter Will Get You | Philippe Labro | Jean-Paul Belmondo, Bruno Cremer, Patrick Fierry | Action | |
| I, Tintin | Henri Roanne, Gérard Valet | | Documentary | Belgian-French co-production |
| Illustrious Corpses | Francesco Rosi | Lino Ventura, Max von Sydow, Fernando Rey | Thriller | Italian-French co-production |
| In the Realm of the Senses | Nagisa Oshima | Eiko Matsuda, Tatsuya Fuji, Aoi Nakajima | Drama | Japanese-French co-production |
| The Innocent | Luchino Visconti | Laura Antonelli, Giancarlo Giannini, Jennifer O'Neill | Drama | Italian–French co-production |
| Je t'aime... moi non plus | Serge Gainsbourg | Jane Birkin, Joe Dallesandro, Hugues Quester | Comedy-drama | |
| The Judge and the Assassin | Bertrand Tavernier | Philippe Noiret, Michel Galabru, Isabel Huppert | | |
| The Last Woman | Marco Ferreri | Gérard Depardieu, Ornella Muti, Michel Piccoli | Drama | |
| Laure | | Annie Belle, Emmanuelle Arsan, Al Cliver | | Italian–French co-production |
| Mado | Claude Sautet | Michel Piccoli, Ottavia Piccolo, Jacques Dutronc | Drama | French–Italian–West German co-production |
| The Margin | Walerian Borowczyk | Sylvia Kristel, Joe Dallesandro, André Falcon, Mireille Audibert, Denis Canuel | Drama | |
| Marie-poupée | Joël Séria | Jeanne Goupil, André Dussollier | Drama | |
| The Marquise of O | Éric Rohmer | Edith Clever, Bruno Ganz, Edda Seippel | Drama | French-West German co-production |
| Monsieur Klein | Joseph Losey | Alain Delon, Jeanne Moreau, Suzanne Flon | Drama | French–Italian co-production |
| À nous les petites Anglaises | Michel Lang | Rémi Laurent, Stéphane Hillel, Sophie Barjac | Comedy, romance | |
| On aura tout vu | Georges Lautner | Miou-Miou, Jean-Pierre Marielle | Comedy | |
| Pardon Mon Affaire | Yves Robert | Jean Rochefort, Claude Brasseur | Comedy | |
| Le plein de super | Alain Cavalier | Patrick Bouchitey, Étienne Chicot | Comedy | |
| Police Python 357 | Alain Corneau | Yves Montand, Simone Signoret, François Périer | | French-West German co-production |
| The Porter from Maxim's | Claude Vital | Michel Galabru, Jean Lefebvre | Comedy | |
| Roma, l'altra faccia della violenza | Marino Girolami | Marcel Bozzuffi, Anthony Steffen, Enio Giorlami | | Italian-French co-production |
| Salon Kitty | Tinto Brass | Helmut Berger, Ingrid Thulin, Teresa Ann Savoy | Adult, drama | Italian–West German–French co-production |
| Small Change | François Truffaut | Geary Desmouceaux, Jean-François Stévenin, Philippe Goldman | Drama | |
| The Tenant | Roman Polanski | Roman Polanski, Isabelle Adjani, Melvyn Douglas | Thriller | French–American co-production |
| The Toy | Francis Veber | Pierre Richard, Michel Bouquet | Comedy | |
| The Twist | Claude Chabrol | Bruce Dern, Stéphane Audran, Ann-Margret | Comedy | |
| The Twelve Tasks of Asterix | René Goscinny, Albert Uderzo | | Animation | |
| The Wing or the Thigh | Claude Zidi | Louis de Funès, Coluche | Comedy | |
| A Woman at Her Window | Pierre Granier-Deferre | Romy Schneider, Philippe Noiret, Victor Lanoux, Umberto Orsini | Drama | French-Italian-West German co-production |

== See also ==
- 1976 in France
- 1976 in French television

== Notes ==
=== Sources ===
- Curti, Roberto (2013). Italian Crime Filmography, 1968-1980. McFarland & Company. ISBN 978-0786469765.
- Curti, Roberto; Lafond, Frank (2026). French Thrillers of the 1970s: Volume I, Crime Films. Jefferson, North Carolina: McFarland & Company. ISBN 978-1-4766-8681-3. LCCN 2025048366.
