= Michel Lang =

French film and television director

- Born: 9 June 1939; Paris, France
- Died: 24 April 2014 (aged 74); Deauville, France
- Occupation: Film director

Michel Lang (9 June 1939 – 24 April 2014) was a French film and television director, best remembered for his comedy films in the late 1970s and 1980s. After 1990, he directed predominantly for French television.

Lang was educated at the Lycée Chaptal. He received a degree in American literature from the Sorbonne, and a diploma from the Institut des hautes études cinématographiques.

== Filmography ==
- 1964 : Un tout autre visage
- 1976 : À nous les petites Anglaises with Sophie Barjac and Rémi Laurent
- 1977 : Une fille cousue de fil blanc with Aude Landry and Serge Reggiani
- 1978 : L'Hôtel de la plage with Sophie Barjac and Myriam Boyer
- 1980 : Tous vedettes with Leslie Caron
- 1981 : On n'est pas des anges... elles non plus with Sabine Azéma and Georges Beller
- 1982 : Le Cadeau with Pierre Mondy and Claudia Cardinale
- 1984 : L'Étincelle
- 1985 : À nous les garçons with Sophie Carle and Franck Dubosc
- 1987 : Club de rencontres with Francis Perrin and Jean-Paul Comart
- 1991 : Duplex (TV)
- 1991 : Mascarade (TV)
- 1992 : Le Fils d'un autre (TV)
- 1992 : Softwar (Mord im Atomkraftwerk) (TV)
- 1992 : Un mort très convenable (TV)
- 1994 : Les Faucons (TV)
- 1995 : Baldipata (TV) with Annie Cordy and Charles Aznavour
- 1995 : Bébé coup de foudre (TV)
- 1997 : Sans cérémonie (TV) with Annie Cordy and Charles Aznavour
- 2002 : Louis et les enfants perdus (TV)
