= Bloody Moon =

1981 film directed by Jesús Franco

- German theatrical release poster
- German: Die Säge des Todes
- Directed by: Jesús Franco
- Screenplay by: Erich Tomek
- Produced by: Wolf C. Hartwig
- Starring: Olivia Pascal
- Edited by: Karl Aulitzky
- Music by: Gerhard Heinz
- Production companies: Metro-Film GmbH; Rapid-Film GmbH; Lisa Film GmbH; Plata Films S.A.
- Release date: 27 March 1981 (West Germany)
- Running time: 84 minutes
- Country: West Germany: Spain
- Language: English

Bloody Moon (German: Die Säge des Todes, lit. 'The Saw of Death'; Spanish: Colegialas violadas, lit. 'Violated schoolgirls') is a 1981 slasher film directed by Jesús Franco and starring Olivia Pascal.

== Plot ==
Miguel, a young man with a disfigured face, tricks a girl into sex by putting a mask on and pretending to be her boyfriend. When she unmasks him, he brutally stabs the young woman with a pair of scissors. After the crimes, Miguel is institutionalized at a mental asylum for 5 years. When his sentence is finished, he is released into the care of his sister, Manuela. Along with their invalid aunt and Countess, Maria Gonzales, his incestuous sister Manuela operates a boarding school for young women called Europe's International Youth-Club Boarding School of Languages on the Costa del Sol.

On his train ride from the sanitarium, he spots a long-haired brunette woman named Angela. Meanwhile, Professor Alvaro arrives at the school to visit Manuela. Maria states that she is being plotted against and that Manuela only wants money. That night, Maria lies in bed before she is burned to death with a torch. Angela arrives at the school later than her friends and stays in the room where Miguel killed the girl. While wiping the bathroom mirror, she sees Miguel reflected before running outside, where the man follows her. She is then cared for by her friend Inga, and the two visit Laura, Eva, and the gardener Antonio. Miguel goes to see his sister, and he proclaims his love to Manuela; the two kiss and touch. Manuela stops him, reminding him of the incident years earlier and citing that nobody understands them.

After a night at the disco, Antonio walks Angela home. While Angela reads in bed, the killer sneaks inside the room, and Eva appears at her window to ask for a pullover. While Eva changes, the killer pierces a long knife into her back, which is then forced out of her breast just before she dies. The next day, Alvaro's Spanish class listens to Spanish dialect tapes. On Angela's tape, the voice suddenly changes and threatens to cut her with a hacksaw. She screams when she sees Miguel at the window, but he disappears when Alvaro returns, and the tape resumes its lessons. After finding bloody clothing at Eva's place, Angela sees Antonio arguing with Manuela before a boulder rolls down a hill and nearly kills Angela. While Manuela notices one of her snakes is missing, Angela asks around for Eva before fleeing after seeing Antonio kill a snake with garden shears. While Antonio tries to stop her, Alvaro appears and tells her to stop bothering his students.

Laura and her friends go to Angela's room, where Inga feigns a sexual act inside. While she does not notice the dead Eva hanging in the closet, the girls see Inga through the window and laugh at her. Outside, Angela sees Inga drive back in a yellow car similar to Manuela's. Inga accompanies the masked killer to an isolated location, where she is tied with a rope. The killer turns on a saw and pushes Inga towards it. After a young boy turns off the machine, the saw is turned back on and decapitates Inga before the killer chases the boy in the car and runs over him.

Meanwhile, Angela packs in her room, where she sees Antonio at the front door and Miguel at the window; she panics and barricades herself. She then lets Laura inside, and Laura offers to stay for the night. Laura goes to the disco club to grab some drinks. When Laura returns, the killer crushes her neck with an iron collar. After receiving a threatening phone call, Angela finds the dead bodies of her friends and is attacked by the killer. While Miguel is knocked out during the struggle, Angela sees Alvaro driving off in his car. Angela runs to Manuela and tells her about the bodies. Manuela takes her to a room and gives her a drink to relax.

Manuela and Alvaro discuss the killings he has done, and an awakened Miguel hears them talk of blaming the murders on him, all for the sake of Manuela retaining the family inheritance. Manuela also mentions how Miguel thinks she loves him and his disfigurement. She tells Alvaro that she has already been paid and tells him to kill Angela. Miguel goes to a room and, eventually believing that Angela is his sister, chokes her until she shoves a spike into his neck. Angela runs downstairs and sees Alvaro and Manuela struggling before screaming at the body of Countess Maria found inside a room. Alvaro runs into the room and holds a knife to Angela, but Manuela appears and murders Alvaro with a hedge cutter; she puts the blade to Angela's throat and reminds her that she saved her life, whereupon Angela nods and runs away. Manuela then goes to her room and talks to her dead brother, but Miguel sits up and strangles Manuela. The film ends with Miguel collapsing and holding onto his sister's hand while Antonio embraces Angela as the police arrive.

== Cast ==
- Olivia Pascal as Angela
- Christoph Moosbrugger as Alvaro
- Alexander Waechter as Miguel
- Nadja Gerganoff as Manuela
- Jasmin Losensky as Inga
- Corinna Gillwald as Laura
- Ann-Beate Engelke as Eva
- Peter Exacoustos as Antonio
- Antonia García as Elvira
- Beatriz Sancho as Nieto
- María Rubio as Countess Maria Gonzales

Uncredited

- Otto Retzer as Bueno
- Jesús Franco as Dr. Domingo Aundos

== Production ==
Bloody Moon was a "work-for-hire" production for Jesús Franco. The screenplay was written by Erich Tomek, under the alias 'Rayo Casablanca'. Initially, the producers planned to shoot the film in Austria, but Franco convinced the producers to film in his home country of Spain instead.

=== Music ===
According to Franco, he was convinced to take the job under the pretense that Pink Floyd was attached to write the soundtrack.

== Release ==
Bloody Moon was released in West Germany on March 27, 1981.

The film was made available on DVD for the first time in the United States by Severin Films in 2008. This version restores all of the gore scenes, including the infamous circular saw beheading scene.

== Reception ==
In a contemporary review, Tom Milne reviewed the film in the Monthly Film Bulletin. Milne described the film as "appallingly meretricious schlock which looks as if it has been slung together using discarded out-takes from a dozen different potboilers" and that the film has "no visible means of support from either plot or characterization, the action simply staggers from one lurid climax to next".

Bloody Moon was received favourably by DVD Verdict. Tim Lucas described Bloody Moon as "not one of Franco's better movies" and stated that the film "compares well to the shoddiness of American examples of the same period such as Prom Night, Bloody Birthday and the Friday the 13th films.

== Sources ==
- Dyer, Richard (2015). Lethal Repetition: Serial Killing in European Cinema. London, England: Bloomsbury. ISBN 978-1-844-57926-6.
