= Myriam Boyer =

French actress (born 1948)

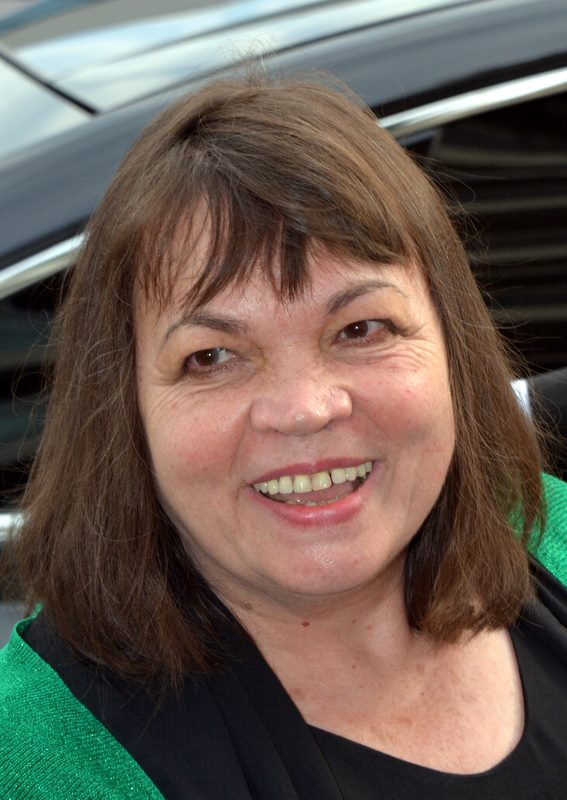
- Boyer at the 2017 Cannes Film Festival.
- Born: 23 May 1948 (age 78); Lyon, France
- Occupation: Actress
- Years active: 1968–present
- Spouses: Roger Cornillac (m. 1966; div. 1972) John Berry (m. 1975; died 1999) Philippe Vincent (m. 2010)
- Children: Clovis Cornillac; Arny Berry

Myriam Boyer (born 23 May 1948) is a French actress. She appeared in more than eighty films and television shows since 1970. At the age of 18, she married Roger Cornillac with whom she had a son, Clovis Cornillac. From 1975 until his death in 1999 she was married to John Berry with whom she had one son, Arny Berry.

== Filmography ==
Year	Title	Role	Director	Notes
1968	Le théâtre de la jeunesse	The little girl	Yves-André Hubert	TV series (1 episode)
1968	Les Cinq Dernières Minutes	Nine	Claude Loursais	TV series (1 episode)
1969	Delphine	A secretary	Éric Le Hung	
1971	Nausicaa	Rosalie	Agnès Varda	TV movie
1971	Les enquêtes du commissaire Maigret	The creamery employee	René Lucot	TV series (1 episode)
1972	La tuile à loups	Maryse	Jacques Ertaud	TV movie
1972	Portrait: Pouchkine	Frida	Jean-Paul Roux	TV movie
1972	Le rendez-vous des Landes	Pegotte	Pierre Gautherin	TV movie
1972	La vie et la passion de Dodin-Bouffant	Angèle	Edmond Tiborovsky	TV movie
1972	Les évasions célèbres	Charlotte	Jean-Pierre Decourt	TV series (1 episode)
1973	A Slightly Pregnant Man	Ninon Barbeau	Jacques Demy	
1973	Malataverne	Gilberte	Jean Archimbaud	TV movie
1974	Le voyage d'Amélie	Solange	Daniel Duval	
1974	L'ombre d'une chance	Sophie	Jean-Pierre Mocky	
1974	Les bidasses s'en vont en guerre	Philippine Brugnon	Claude Zidi	
1974	Vincent, François, Paul and the Others	Laurence	Claude Sautet	
1974	Ici, peut-être		Gérard Chouchan	TV movie
1974	L'amour triste	Solange	François Martin	TV movie
1974	La clé des champs	Myriam	Yves Laumet	TV movie
1974	Le colchique et l'étoile	The servant	Michel Subiela	TV movie
1974	Le pain noir		Serge Moati	TV mini-series
1974	Les brigades du Tigre	The prostitute	Victor Vicas	TV series (1 episode)
1975	Le triangle écorché	Edmée	Pierre Kalfon	
1975	Il pleut toujours où c'est mouillé	Marianne	Jean-Daniel Simon	
1975	Une vieille maîtresse	Bonine	Jacques Trébouta	TV movie
1976	Naked Massacre	Leila	Denis Héroux	
1976	Jonah Who Will Be 25 in the Year 2000	Mathilde	Alain Tanner	
1976	Cinéma 16	Jacqueline Mercier	Jean-Daniel Simon	TV series (1 episode)
1977	Solemn Communion	Léone Gravet-Rux	René Féret	
1977	The Old Country Where Rimbaud Died	Jeanne	Jean Pierre Lefebvre	
1977	La mort amoureuse	Marie	Jacques Ertaud	TV movie
1977	L'ancre de miséricorde	Manon de Gwened	Bernard d'Abrigeon	TV movie
1977	Dossiers : Danger immédiat	Nicole	Claude Barma	TV series (1 episode)
1978	Vas-y maman	Alice	Nicole de Buron	
1978	Holiday Hotel	Aline Dandrel	Michel Lang	
1979	Série noire	Jeanne	Alain Corneau	Nominated - César Award for Best Supporting Actress
1979	Laisse-moi rêver	Françoise	Robert Ménégoz	
1979	Cinéma 16	Sabine	Daniel Moosmann	TV series (1 episode)
1980	Ça va? Ça va!	Viviane	Jacques Krier	TV movie
1981	L'examen	Maryse Bordier	Jean-Daniel Simon	TV movie
1982	Le village sur la colline	Marie	Yves Laumet	TV mini-series
1983	Sarah dit... Leila dit...	Sarah	Frans Buyens	
1984	Viva la vie	Pauline	Claude Lelouch	
1985	Le voyage à Paimpol	Maryvonne	John Berry	
1985	Julien Fontanes, magistrat	Norma Lagneau	Daniel Moosmann	TV series (1 episode)
1986	Golden Eighties	Sylvie	Chantal Akerman	
1988	Il y a maldonne	Marco's mother	John Berry	
1989	Too Beautiful for You	Geneviève	Bertrand Blier	
1989	Pause-café	Madame Caput	Serge Leroy	TV series (1 episode)
1990	Uranus	Madame Gaigneux	Claude Berri	
1991	Tous les Matins du Monde	Guignotte	Alain Corneau	
1991	Le miel amer		Maurice Frydland	TV movie
1991	Les enfants de la plage	Marcelle	Williams Crépin	TV movie
1992	A Heart in Winter	Madame Amet	Claude Sautet	
1992	From Time to Time	9-Eye	Jeff Blyth	Short
1992	Maigret	Élyane Michonnet	Alain Tasma & Bertrand Van Effenterre	TV series (1 episode)
1993	1, 2, 3, Sun	Daniela Laspada	Bertrand Blier	Nominated - César Award for Best Supporting Actress
1993	La sieste	The woman	François Koltès	Short
1993	Police Secrets	Irène	Josée Dayan	TV series (1 episode)
1993	Le JAP, juge d'application des peines	Mathilde	Josée Dayan	TV series (1 episode)
1994	L'été de Zora	Armelle	Marc Rivière	TV movie
1994	Rêveuse jeunesse	Georges's mother	Nadine Trintignant	TV movie
1995	La poudre aux yeux	The ophthalmologist	Maurice Dugowson	
1995	Those Were the Days	Bertrand's mother	Didier Haudepin	
1995	Les Cinq Dernières Minutes	Liliane Verchellle	Pascal Goethals	TV series (1 episode)
1996	L'amerloque	Yvonne	Jean-Claude Sussfeld	TV movie
1996	Un drôle de cadeau	Suzanne	Daniel Losset	TV movie
1996	Le R.I.F.	Maryse Lespert	Michel Andrieu	TV series (1 episode)
1996	Julie Lescaut	Léa Berthier	Josée Dayan	TV series (1 episode)
1998	La mère Christain	Mother Christian	Myriam Boyer	Also writer & director
1998	L'instit	Thérèse	Claudio Tonetti	TV series (1 episode)
2000	T'aime	Christine	Patrick Sébastien	
2001	Jalousie	Élisabeth	Marco Pauly	TV movie
2001	Vertiges	Aimée Caravage	Patrick Poubel	TV series (1 episode)
2003	Leave Your Hands on My Hips	The concierge	Chantal Lauby	
2003	Le télégramme	Blanche	Coralie Fargeat	Short
2003	Orages	Denise Le Henin	Peter Kassovitz	TV movie
2003	Les enfants de Charlotte	Yvonne Larmant	François Luciani	TV movie
2004	Peurs	The neighbor	Myriam Boyer	Short, also writer & director
2004	Marie sans adieu	Mariette	Philippe Larue	Short
2004	L'homme qui venait d'ailleurs	Clémence	François Luciani	TV movie
2005	Itinéraires	Madame Chougny	Christophe Otzenberger	
2005	Gris blanc	Christine	Karim Dridi	TV movie
2006	Vivat (qu'il vive)		Gilles Deroo	Short
2006	Fabien Cosma	Mado	Jean-Claude Sussfeld	TV series (1 episode)
2007	Roman de Gare	Huguette's mother	Claude Lelouch	
2007	Le sang noir	Maïa	Peter Kassovitz	TV movie
2007	Le voyageur de la Toussaint	Jaja	Philippe Laïk	TV movie
2008	Mesrine: Killer Instinct	Mesrine's mother	Jean-François Richet	
2008	La mort n'oublie personne	Madame Debats	Laurent Heynemann	TV movie
2008	Collection Fred Vargas	Clémentine	Josée Dayan	TV series (1 episode)
2009	Mensch	Emma Hazak	Steve Suissa	
2010	The Clink of Ice	Louisa's cancer	Bertrand Blier	
2010	La vie devant soi	Madame Rosa	Myriam Boyer	TV movie, also director
2011	Monsieur Papa	Suzy Benchetrit	Kad Merad	
2012	Le monde à l'envers	Mado	Sylvain Desclous	Short; Vendome Short Film Festival - Acting Award
2016	Death by Death	Monique Peneud	Xavier Seron	
2016	Le chant du merle	Aurélie's mother	Frédéric Pelle	
2016	La Femme aux cheveux rouges	Jeanne Naudy	Thierry Peythieu	TV movie
2016	Chefs	Mother Guy	Clovis Cornillac	TV series (1 episode)
2017	L'Amant double	Rose	François Ozon	
2018	Tricky Old Dogs	Berthe Goitreux	Christophe Duthuron	
2022	Jeanne	Jeanne	Fabien Remblier	Short-film

== Theater ==
Year	Title	Author	Director	Notes
1983	Combat de nègre et de chiens	Bernard-Marie Koltès	Patrice Chéreau	
1987	The Suicide	Nikolai Erdman	Claude Stratz	
1987	Hello and Goodbye	Athol Fugard	John Berry	Also producer
1988	Woyzeck	Georg Büchner	Daniel Benoin	
1988	Réveille-toi, Philadelphie !	François Billetdoux	Jorge Lavelli	
1989	Danton's Death	Georg Büchner	Klaus Michael Grüber	
1990	Rixe	Jean-Claude Grumberg	Bruno Boëglin	
1990	The Good Person of Szechwan	Bertolt Brecht	Bernard Sobel	
1991	Roberto Zucco	Bernard-Marie Koltès	Bruno Boëglin	Nominated - Molière Award for Best Supporting Actress
1992	Dîner de textes	Jacques Bonnaffé	Jacques Bonnaffé	
1993	Demain une fenêtre sur rue	Jean-Claude Grumberg	Jean-Paul Roussillon	
1994	Ideal fleurs	Michel Jourdheuil	Jean-Paul Muel	
1995	Celle-là	Daniel Danis	Alain Françon	
1995	Le Faucon	Marie Laberge	Gabriel Garran	
1995	Le Retour au désert	Bernard-Marie Koltès	Jacques Nichet	Prix du Syndicat de la critique - Best Actress
1996	Who's Afraid of Virginia Woolf?	Edward Albee	John Berry	Molière Award for Best Actress
1998	Tchin-Tchin	François Billetdoux	Marcel Maréchal	
1999	Viol	Danièle Sallenave	Brigitte Jaques	
2000	Le Boomerang	Bernard Da Costa	Myriam Boyer	
2001	Mourir en Messidor	Raymond Léopold Bruckberger	Stéphane Hillel	
2001-2002	Scenes from an Execution	Howard Barker	Hélène Vincent	
2002	Misery	Stephen King	Daniel Benoin	
2003	Viol	Danièle Sallenave	Brigitte Jaques	
2003	Médée Kali	Laurent Gaudé	Philippe Calvario	
2005	The Vagina Monologues	Eve Ensler	Isabelle Rattier	
2005	Slogans pour 343 actrices	Maria Soudaïeva & Antoine Volodine	Bérangère Bonvoisin	
2005	Je viens d'un pays de neige	Anne Jolivet	Anne Jolivet	Nominated - Molière Award for Best Actress
2006	A woman of mystery	John Cassavetes	Marc Goldberg	
2007-2008	The Life Before Us	Romain Gary	Didier Long	Molière Award for Best Actress
2010-2012	Désolé pour la moquette	Bertrand Blier	Bertrand Blier	
2012-2013	Riviera	Emmanuel Robert Espalieu	Gérard Gelas	
2014	Chère Elena	Ludmilla Razoumovskaïa	Didier Long	Nominated - Molière Award for Best Actress
2015-2016	Le Chat	Georges Simenon	Didier Long	
2018	Misery	Stephen King	Daniel Benoin	
2019	Louise au parapluie	Emmanuel Robert-Espalieu	Emmanuel Robert-Espalieu	
