= Holiday Hotel =

1978 film by Michel Lang

L'Hôtel de la plage
- Directed by: Michel Lang
- Written by: Michel Lang
- Produced by: Marc Goldstaub; Alain Poiré; Robert Sussfeld
- Starring: Sophie Barjac; Myriam Boyer; Daniel Ceccaldi; Michèle Grellier; Bruno Guillain; Guy Marchand; Anne Parillaud; Michel Robin; Martine Sarcey
- Cinematography: Daniel Gaudry
- Edited by: Hélène Plemiannikov
- Music by: Mort Shuman
- Distributed by: Gaumont Distribution
- Release date: 11 January 1978
- Running time: 110 minutes
- Country: France
- Language: French

Holiday Hotel (French title:L'Hôtel de la plage) is a 1978 French comedy film directed and written by Michel Lang. The film stars Sophie Barjac and Myriam Boyer on a summer holiday in Brittany.

== Cast ==
- Sophie Barjac ... Catherine Guedel
- Myriam Boyer ... Aline Dandrel
- Daniel Ceccaldi ... Euloge St. Prix
- Michèle Grellier ... Marie-Laure Delambre
- Francis Lemaire ... Lucien Vermaelen
- Robert Lombard ... Guedel
- Bruno Du Louvat ... Antoine
- Guy Marchand ... Hubert Delambre
- Jean-Paul Muel ... Paul Dandrel
- Anne Parillaud ... Estelle
- Michel Robin ... Léonce
- Martine Sarcey ... Elisabeth Rouvier
- Bernard Soufflet ... Bertrand
- Rosine Cadoret ... Cécile St.Prix
- Anna Gaël ... Brenda
- Blanche Ravalec ... Yveline
- Germaine Delbat ... Madame Léonce
- Madeleine Bouchez ... Belle-Maman Dandrel / Grandma Dandrel
- Marcelle-Jeane Bretonniere ... Odette Vermaelen
- Hélène Batteux ... Mme Guedel
- Valérie Boisgel ... Mother of Rose-Annie
- Marilyne Canto ... Juliette Guedel
- Marie Bunel ... Claudie (as Marie-Laure Bunel)
- Gérard Gustin ... Jean-Pierre
- Denis Lefebvre Duprey ... Stéphane (as Denis Lefèbvre)
- Philippe Ruggieri ... Pierre-Alain
- Geoffrey Carey ... Dave (as Geoffroy Carey)
- Arch Taylor
- Fenella Maguire ... L'anglaise du train
- Roger Trapp ... Monsieur télégramme
- Jacques Bouanich ... Le présentateur de chanson
- Jean Texier ... Monsieur Muscle
- Katy Amaizo ... Une chanteuse (as Cathy Amaizo)
- Vicky Fury ... Une chanteuse
- Didier Savary ... Le chanteur
- Malène Sveinbjornsson ... Charlotte
- Lionel Melet ... Jean-François
- Thomas Sussfeld ... Doudou
- Pascal Beguet ... Sébastien
- Olivier Jurion ... Le premier jumeau
- Benoît Jurion ... Le second jumeau
- Martine Desroches ... Caroline Dandrel

== Controversy ==
The uncensored broadcast of the movie by TV5 Monde on 7 June 2015 in Indonesia led to the banning of the channel by Indonesian authority.
