= Archibald Taylor =

Archibald Taylor may refer to:

- Archibald Taylor House, Franklin County, North Carolina
- Archibald Taylor Plantation House, Granville County, North Carolina
- Archibald Taylor (cricketer) (born 1941), New Zealand cricketer

== See also ==
- Archie Taylor (disambiguation)
