= Olivia Pascal =

German actress (born 1957)

- Born: Olivia Gerlitzki; 26 May 1957 (age 67); Munich, West Germany
- Occupation: Actress
- Years active: 1977–present
- Spouse: Peter Kanitz (m. 2009)

Olivia Pascal (born Olivia Gerlitzki: 26 May 1957 in Munich, West Germany) is a German actress.

== Career ==
Olivia Pascal was working as a medical assistant in 1976 when she was discovered by director Hubert Frank for the erotic film Vanessa. She then played in several erotic films and sex comedies such as The Fruit is Ripe (1977), Interno di un convento (1977) and Die Insel der tausend Freuden (aka Triangle of Venus) (1978) as well as horror films and thrillers before becoming a television actress. She appeared as a presenter on the television series Bananas from 1981 to 1984. She went on to regular roles on multiple German television series: Somehow and Anyways in 1986, The Black Forest Clinic from 1986 to 1989, Friends for Life from 1994 to 1997, and the telenovela Verliebt in Berlin from 2005 to 2007. She had a long-running role as Detective Inspector Lizzy Berger in SOKO 5113 from 1988 to 1997.

Pascal also has appeared on stage in the plays Der muss es sein (Beau Jest) from 1996 to 2001 and Auf und davon (Birds on the Wing) from 1999 to 2002.

== Selected filmography ==
- Vanessa (1977), as Vanessa Anden
- The Fruit is Ripe (1977), as Amanda
- Casanova & Co. (1977), as Angela
- Arrête ton char... bidasse! (1977), as Maria
- Interno di un convento (1977)
- Popcorn and Ice Cream (1978), as Vivi Berger
- Cola, Candy, Chocolate (1979), as Gaby
- Burning Rubber (1981), as Maxe
- Bloody Moon (1981), as Angela
- C.O.D. (1981), as Holly
- Sunshine Reggae in Ibiza (1983), as Christa
- Coconuts (1985), as Vera
- Somehow and Anyways (TV series, 11 episodes, 1986), as Christl Burger
- The Black Forest Clinic (TV series, 29 episodes, 1986–89), as Carola
- SOKO 5113 (TV series, 83 episodes, 1988–97), as Lizzy Berger
- Friends for Life (TV series, 30 episodes, 1994–97), as Dr. Beate Chevalier
- Curse This House (2004, TV film)
- Verliebt in Berlin (TV series, 39 episodes, 2005–07), as Laura Seidel

== Personal life ==
Pascal was previously in a 13-year relationship with actor and director Pascal Breuer. In 2009 she married Peter Kanitz. The couple lives in Munich.
