= The Fruit is Ripe =

1977 film by Sigi Rothemund

The Fruit Is Ripe
- Directed by: Sigi Rothemund
- Written by: Christian Dura; Patrizia Piccardi
- Produced by: Karl Spiehs
- Starring: Betty Vergès; Claus Richt
- Cinematography: Heinz Hölscher
- Music by: Gerhard Heinz
- Release date: 20 January 1977
- Running time: 1h 35min
- Country: West Germany
- Languages: German, English

The Fruit Is Ripe (German: Griechische Feigen, lit. 'Greek Figs') is a 1977 German softcore erotic comedy film directed by Sigi Rothemund.

== Plot ==
Patricia (Betty Vergès) is a young woman from a wealthy family in Greece who is bound to Munich for college. At the airport, she gives away her ticket and instead begins to hitchhike around Greece by automobile and boat in a journey of self-discovery. In the course of her travels, she becomes an object of desire. She's pursued by several suitors, but she turns them all down until she falls for Tom (Claus Richt), a sailor with whom she tours the Aegean. Tom leaves her after a fight, but eventually comes back to her.

== Cast ==
- Betty Vergès as Patricia
- Claus Richt as Tom
- Olivia Pascal as Amanda
- Wolf Goldan as Bernd
