= Archie Taylor =

Archie or Archy Taylor may refer to:

- Archie Taylor (sport shooter) (1869-1939), British sports shooter
- Archie Taylor (footballer, born 1882) (1882 – ?), Scottish footballer who won the FA Cup in 1912
- Archie Taylor (footballer) in 1904 FA Cup Final
- Archie Taylor (footballer, born 1939) (born 1939), English footballer
- Archy Taylor (born 2003), English footballer for Westfield and Aldershot Town see 2023–24 Isthmian League

== See also ==
- Archibald Taylor (disambiguation)
