= Bordertown (1989 TV series) =

Canadian–French television series

- Complete series DVD cover
- Starring: Richard Comar; John H. Brennan; Sophie Barjac
- Countries of origin: Canada; France
- No. of seasons: 3
- No. of episodes: 78

Production
- Executive producer: Robert Lantos
- Producers: Stéphane Reichel; Lionel E. Siegel; Jana Veverka
- Running time: 23 minutes
- Production companies: I.T.I./TéléImages; Alliance Entertainment; La Cinq (1991)

Original release
- Network: The Family Channel; CTV; La Cinq (1991)
- Release: January 7, 1989 – March 17, 1991

Bordertown is a Western drama television series that aired 78 half-hour episodes from 1989 to 1991. It is set during the 1880s in a small town that straddles the United States and Canadian border, and law enforcement duties are shared between a U.S. Marshal and a North-West Mounted Police corporal.

The series was a co-production between Canada's Alliance Corporation and France's Tele-Image. It first aired on the American cable network The Family Channel on January 7, 1989, and was seen on Canada's CTV beginning in 1990. A 1989 newspaper article stated that contracts were being prepared for the series to air in France, Italy, and several other European countries.

== Premise ==
A small town was established on the United States-Canadian border named Pemmican (the name of a traditional indigenous food), but when the area was surveyed it was discovered that the 49th parallel, which divides the two countries, goes through the middle of the community, and bisects the law enforcement office. NWMP Corporal Clive Bennett and U. S. Marshal Jack Craddock share the same office (divided by a painted line on the floor) and patrol the town that is half in Alberta and half in Montana. The officers also share an interest in Marie Dumont, the town's doctor, and owner of the general store.

In an interview series star Richard Comar stated that the "whole premise of the show is based on the border." How lawmen from two countries react to events show the differences between the Canadian and American legal systems.

== Production information ==
The series was a co-produced by Alliance Entertainment Corporation of Canada and Tele-Images of France. French directors were often used, and Sophie Barjac was hired to play a main character who had come from Paris in order to broaden the series' appeal to French investors.

The town was built on a ranch east of Vancouver, Canada. Sixty-five carpenters worked for six weeks to build the half-million-dollar complex. All buildings were complete inside and out. No soundstage work was done during the filming of the series; everything was shot inside or outside of the buildings that had been constructed for Bordertown.

Effort was made to have the series look as authentic as possible. A 1989 article stated that the general store held "an array of merchandise worthy of the finest western museum." The saloon was stocked with antique bottles, and the livery stable had hundred-year-old saddles.

== Cast ==
- Richard Comar - Marshal Jack Craddock (United States lawman)
- John H. Brennan - Corporal Clive Bennett (Canadian lawman)
- Sophie Barjac - Marie Dumont (French-born doctor and store owner)
- Beverley Elliot - Sally Duffield (owns boarding house, works in Marie's store)
- Fritz Bergold - Otto Danzinger (original livery stable owner)
- Duncan Fraser - Zachary Denny (Southern saloon owner)
- Gregory Togal - Willie Haddon (boy befriended by Jack Craddock)
- Domenico Fiore - Dominic Bertino (saloon bartender)
- Paul Batten - Wendell MacWherther (banker who later bought livery stable)
- Patrice Valota - Gabriel Couteau (Metis man who helps track criminals)
- Sarah Sawatsky - Lucy Walker (orphaned girl adopted by Marie)

== Episodes ==
=== Series overview ===
Season	Episodes	Originally released	
Season	Episodes	First released	Last released
1	26	January 7, 1989	July 1, 1989
2	26	January 5, 1990	June 29, 1990
3	26	September 14, 1990	March 17, 1991

=== Season 1 (1989) ===
No. overall	No. in season	Title	Directed by	Written by	Original release date
1	1	"Civilization"	Stuart Gillard	R.B. Carney & Tony Sheer	7 January 1989
When a rancher's son is killed the rancher seeks revenge.
2	2	"Runners"	Stuart Gillard	Larry Gaynor	14 January 1989
Marie's nephew comes for a visit at the same time the mountie payroll is robbed.
3	3	"Medicine Woman"	Susan Martin	Suzette Couture	21 January 1989
Marie needs proof that an Indian agent is selling food meant for the starving Blackfeet.
4	4	"Blindside"	Susan Martin	Deborah Nathan	28 January 1989
Jack's former Texas Ranger friends try to smuggle stolen rifles across the border.
5	5	"The Man They Couldn't Hang"	Stuart Gillard	W.J. Ancevich	4 February 1989
A man who survived a hanging loses his voice and is in danger of being hanged a second time.
6	6	"A Model Citizen"	Susan Martin	Suzette Couture	11 February 1989
A Chinese man overhears a robbery plot and risks his life to tell Clive and Jack.
7	7	"Over the Line"	Brad Turner	Michael Mercer	18 February 1989
A white boy is in a Cree hunting party. Is he a captive, or a member of the tribe?
8	8	"Blood Fury"	Michael Robison	Jim Henshaw	25 February 1989
Jack wants revenge when the man who killed wounded men during the Civil War comes to town as a railroad promoter.
9	9	"The Reaper"	Stuart Gillard	Tony Sheer	4 March 1989
When a gunfighter comes to town Marie learns why he's there.
10	10	"The Killing"	Stuart Gillard	Jana Veverka	11 March 1989
Liam is determined to help a blind fortuneteller who is forced to work for a thief.
11	11	"The Gunfighter"	Stuart Gillard	Peter Mohan	18 March 1989
A tenderfoot who was cheated plans to go up against a gunfighter.
12	12	"Trapped"	Pierre Magny	Michael Mercer & Phil Rosenberg	25 March 1989
Outlaws shoot one of their own gang, who hides out at Marie's house.
13	13	"Slave"	Brad Turner	W.J. Ancevich	1 April 1989
Diane Denny tries to kill her former owner when he arrives in Bordertown.
14	14	"One of the Boys"	Philippe Martin-Morice	Deborah Nathan	8 April 1989
When Marie treats a wounded "cowboy" she learns the ranch worker is a woman.
15	15	"When Dreams Die"	Brad Turner	J.K.E. Rose	15 April 1989
Sally is told her husband will be released from prison if she pays a fee.
16	16	"The Lady and the Corpse"	George Erschbamer	Janet MacLean	22 April 1989
Dominic's deceased friend left him half his gold, but a lady takes the money.
17	17	"The Fur Trader"	Jean-Pierre Prévost	Pascal Bancou & Christian Bouveron	29 April 1989
A trapper is murdered and his furs stolen. Jack and Clive suspect Marie's friend.
18	18	"Ties That Bind"	Brad Turner	Jana Veverka	6 May 1989
Willie meets his father, who wants to take him to Paris.
19	19	"The Bounty Hunter"	Jean-Pierre Prévost	Tony Foster	13 May 1989
Don Carlos, the man who had Jack's family killed, sends men after Jack.
20	20	"Legacy"	René Bonnière	Michael Mercer	20 May 1989
The son of Clive's friend joins an outlaw gang, will he allow Clive to be murdered?
21	21	"Bad Memories"	Paolo Barzman	Pascal Bancou & Christian Bouveron	27 May 1989
A man is shot and loses his memory.
22	22	"Craddock vs. Bennett"	René Bonnière	Suzette Couture	3 June 1989
A boxing match between law officers distracts the town while the bank is robbed.
23	23	"Nahanni"	Paolo Barzman	Lionel E. Siegel	10 June 1989
a Native woman gives birth, and claims she is married to a dying mountie.
24	24	"Vigilante"	René Bonnière	Jana Veverka	17 June 1989
When a rancher's horses are stolen he tries to lynch the man his daughter loves.
25	25	"Gold and Lead"	Michael Robison	Lionel E. Siegel	24 June 1989
Bruno's sweetheart's father shoots MacWherter, and Bruno tries to capture the shooter.
26	26	"Keenan's Raiders"	René Bonnière	Tony Sheer	1 July 1989
The Raiders leave prison and plan to split $150,000. Two of them die and one kidnaps Marie.

=== Season 2 (1990) ===
No. overall	No. in season	Title	Directed by	Written by	Original release date
27	1	"Hunter's Moon"	René Bonnière	Michael Mercer	January 5, 1990
Bat Masterson tracks men into Canada and breaks the law trying to capture them.
28	2	"The Pony Riders"	Pierre Magny	Lorne Rossman	January 12, 1990
Bruno takes a job with an express company and travels a route that crosses a Blackfeet burial ground.
29	3	"Hand to Hand"	Ken Jubenvill	Malcolm MacRury	January 19, 1990
Clive transports the outlaw who shot his mountie friend.
30	4	"The Last Shot"	Stuart Gillard	W.J. Ancevich	January 26, 1990
Jack gives up his badge after accidentally killing a woman.
31	5	"The Convoy"	Bernard Dumont	Pascal Bancou & Christian Bouveron	February 2, 1990
Outlaws disguised as mounties shoot Clive and try to steal a wagon load of firearms.
32	6	"The Last Fenian Raid"	René Bonnière	Lyal Brown & Barbara Brown	February 9, 1990
Liam's niece is involved with a group trying to steal money.
33	7	"Letter of the Law"	Neill Fearnley	Tom Drake & Sally Drake	February 16, 1990
A man is shot in the U.S. by a man standing in Canada. Which country's laws should be followed?
34	8	"White Feather"	René Bonnière	Marlene Matthews	February 23, 1990
A member of the Blackfeet tribe saves Marie's life, then kidnaps her for his bride.
35	9	"Four Eyes"	Allan King	Paul Ledoux	March 2, 1990
Game hunter Teddy Roosevelt goes after the gunmen who tried to rob him.
36	10	"Skirmishes"	Jean-Pierre Prévost	Bruce Dysart	March 9, 1990
Rancher Jordan will kill to keep men from his water; Marie may be forced to give up her medical practice since she has no license.
37	11	"Buffalo Girl"	Pierre Magny	Michael Mercer	March 16, 1990
Couteau guides a buffalo hunt; Jack tries to arrest a woman attempting to save the buffalo.
38	12	"Ancient Claims"	Dominique Masson	Peter Mitchell	March 23, 1990
Mr. Jordan's ranch is on Cree hunting land.
39	13	"Killer with a Smile"	René Bonnière	Anthony Robertson	March 30, 1990
When President Garfield comes to town he is nearly assassinated.
40	14	"Straight from the Heart"	Jean-Pierre Prévost	Suzette Couture	April 6, 1990
Clive's minister father wants him to take over his church.
41	15	"Compadres"	Stuart Gillard	Peter Mitchell & Jana Veverka	April 13, 1990
Zach Denny and Mr. MacWherter are on a stage that is robbed.
42	16	"When Gold Turns Black"	Stuart Gillard	Pierre Colin-Thibert	April 20, 1990
MacWherter buys an unsafe gold mine, and his partner hires Chinese workers.
43	17	"Gun Down"	Neill Fearnley	Jana Veverka	April 27, 1990
Jack kills a man and many shun him; orphaned Lucy comes to stay with an aunt who has died, so Marie offers to care for her.
44	18	"Two Moons"	Brad Turner	Colin Thibert	May 4, 1990
Couteau helps capture a Native accused of killing a mountie.
45	19	"The Last of the James Gang"	Paolo Barzman	Malcolm MacRury	May 11, 1990
Pinkerton agents arrest Jack for being a member of the James gang.
46	20	"Snap Shot"	Neill Fearnley	Pierre Colin-Thibert	May 18, 1990
A photographer is murdered, and Willie and Lucy help the youth accused of the crime.
47	21	"The Fourth Estate"	Paolo Barzman	Pascal Bancou & Christian Bouveron	May 25, 1990
A lady newspaper owner opposes the man running for mayor.
48	22	"The Heart of Adventure"	Brad Turner	J.K.E. Rose	June 1, 1990
A writer joins an outlaw gang that robs a bank and kidnaps Sally.
49	23	"A Brand of Justice"	Brad Turner	Julie Lacey	June 8, 1990
The Rancher's Association want Jordan to join. When he refuses they hire men to steal his horses, then shoot the men.
50	24	"Devil's Right Hand"	Stuart Gillard	Peter Mitchell	June 15, 1990
A trader comes to town with a gun holster that belonged to Jack's father.
51	25	"Fool's Gold"	Pierre Magny	Jana Veverka & Peter Mitchell	June 22, 1990
A man is shot and refuses to say why. Marie goes camping and ends up hunting gold with the man.
52	26	"All for One"	Brad Turner	Bruno Dega	June 29, 1990
Clive is offered a promotion that requires reassignment; he and Jack fight over Marie.

=== Season 3 (1990–91) ===
No. overall	No. in season	Title	Directed by	Written by	Original release date
53	1	"Second Chance (Part 1)"	Stuart Gillard	Peter Mitchell & Anthony Robertson	14 September 1990
Clive's former sweetheart comes to see where her husband is buried, and she accepts Clive's marriage proposal.
54	2	"Vengeance Is Mine (Part 2)"	Stuart Gillard	Anthony Robertson & Peter Mitchell	21 September 1990
When Clive's bride is killed at the altar he sets out to avenge her death.
55	3	"Nebraska Lightning"	Bernard Dumont	Michael Mercer	28 September 1990
Bat Masterson comes to town in search of an outlaw.
56	4	"Let There Be Light"	Daniel Moosmann	Christine Foster	5 October 1990
MacWherter brings electric lights to town; a thief attempts to rob the bank.
57	5	"Sons of Thunder"	Neill Fearnley	Malcolm MacRury	12 October 1990
A Metis horse thief tries to win Jack's sympathy.
58	6	"Wild Horses"	Ken Jubenvill	Tom Drake & Sally Drake	19 October 1990
A man agrees to sell his horses in Bordertown, but another man claims ownership.
59	7	"Blood"	René Bonnière	Story by : Peter Mitchell & Julie Lacey; Teleplay by : Julie Lacey & Jana Veverka	26 October 1990
Couteau tracks down an outlaw and discovers its his long lost brother.
60	8	"Sweet Revenge"	Didier Albert	Pascal Bancou & Christian Bouveron	2 November 1990
When Jack kills a stage robber the man's children vow revenge.
61	9	"Sight Unseen"	Ken Jubenvill	Lorne Rossman	9 November 1990
Clive is temporarily blinded and must rely on a woman with a hidden past.
62	10	"The Preacher"	Daniel Moosmann	Sylvie Dervin	16 November 1990
A preacher demands that he being given charge of a Native child he claims is ill.
63	11	"Honour Thy Father"	Brad Turner	Story by : Peter Mitchell; Teleplay by : Malcolm MacRury	25 November 1990
Couteau is wounded and accused of killing the man he was working for.
64	12	"In Cold Blood"	Paolo Barzman	Aaron Barzman	2 December 1990
The man who killed Jack's family comes to Bordertown.
65	13	"A Question of Negligence"	Jean-Pierre Prévost	Nancy Heikin-Pepin	9 December 1990
Marie is charged with medical malpractice; Louis Gilbert now owns a share of her store.
66	14	"Conduct Becoming"	Paolo Barzman	Peter Mitchell	16 December 1990
A Cree lawyer claims that Bordertown is to be returned to his people.
67	15	"The Bostonian"	Jean-Pierre Prévost	Pascal Bancou & Christian Bouveron	23 December 1990
When a rancher dies his Boston nephew inherits his ranch; the newcomer tries to convince Jack his uncle was murdered.
68	16	"Field of Honour"	Neill Fearnley	Pierre Colin-Thibert	30 December 1990
A French peddler challenges Louis Gilbert to a duel.
69	17	"The New Recruit"	Ken Jubenvill	Julie Lacey	6 January 1991
An outlaw disguise himself as a mountie.
70	18	"Marshal Law"	Michael Schock	Nancy Heikin-Pepin	13 January 1991
Willie and Lucy run away from their chores and find a murdered man.
71	19	"Roaring Days"	Ken Jubenvill	Peter Mitchell	20 January 1991
Archie Stanton comes to Bordertown with a secret about Clive's past.
72	20	"The Road Chosen"	Richard Comar	Aaron Barzman	27 January 1991
Marie treats an outlaw, and the man's partners keep Marie and Lucy hostage in their home.
73	21	"Hired Hand"	Alain Nahum	Paul Aitken	3 February 1991
Joanna Radway wants to buy more land and sends men to convince the owners to sell.
74	22	"Demon Rum"	Stuart Gillard	Michael Mercer	10 February 1991
When a ranch hand dies of bad whisky Joanna Radway tries to close the saloon.
75	23	"Tall in the Saddle"	Stuart Gillard	Jana Veverka	22 February 1991
Willie's father comes to take him to Paris; someone wants to kill Jack.
76	24	"A Small Kindness"	Neill Fearnley	Peter Mitchell	3 March 1991
When Sally's boarding house is about to be foreclosed she plans to leave town.
77	25	"Frontier Passage"	Didier Albert	Aaron Barzman	10 March 1991
Marie and her in-laws find danger at a stage coach stop.
78	26	"Under Western Skies"	Paolo Barzman	Julie Lacey, Peter Mitchell & Jana Veverka	17 March 1991
Jack is shot and Clive risks his life to escape outlaws in order to save the marshal.

== DVD releases ==
Platinum Disc Corporation released 4-volume collections of Bordertown on DVD in Region 1 between 2003-2005. These releases have been discontinued and are now out of print.

On February 1, 2011, Echo Bridge Home Entertainment released 2 volume collections on DVD in Region 1 (US only). These releases contain the same 28 episodes as the previous Platinum Disc releases.

On July 26, 2011, Alliance Home Entertainment released The Best of Bordertown on DVD in Canada only. The set is exactly the same as the 4-disc set released in the US in 2005 and February 2011, even right down to the Platinum Disc Corporation logo appearing as soon as the disc boots up.

On December 12, 2012, Echo Bridge Home Entertainment released Bordertown- The Complete Series on DVD in Region 1.

On January 6, 2015 Echo Bridge Home Entertainment released Bordertown & Gold: Complete Collection on DVD.

== Bilbliography ==
- Tim Brooks and Earle Marsh, The Complete Directory to Prime Time Network and Cable TV Shows 1946–Present, Ninth edition (New York: Ballantine Books, 2007) ISBN 978-0-345-49773-4
