= Arrête ton char... bidasse! =

- Directed by: Michel Gérard
- Written by: Michel Gérard; Werner P. Zibaso
- Produced by: Georges Glass
- Starring: Darry Cowl
- Cinematography: Jean Monsigny
- Edited by: Georges Marschalk
- Music by: Darry Cowl; Jean-Michel Defaye
- Release date: December 7, 1977
- Running time: 90 minutes
- Countries: France, West Germany
- Language: French

Arrête ton char... bidasse! is a 1977 French comedy film directed by Michel Gérard.

== Plot ==
Four young Frenchmen have to do their military service in Germany. The strict discipline isn't to their liking. Each time they are allowed to leave the barracks they relish it and go out for adventures.

== Cast and roles ==
- Darry Cowl – Colonel Lessard
- Pierre Tornade – Capitaine Marcus
- Robert Castel – Rodriguez
- Stéphane Hillel – Raoul
- Rémi Laurent – Francis
- Michel Bonnet – Adjudant Boutain
- Frédéric Duru – Caporal Benoît
- Anton Duschek – Bourgmestre
- Angelika Hauff – Maria's mother (credited as Angelica Hauff)
- Jacques Faber – Lieutenant Finclair
- Evelyne Kraft – Karin (credited as Evelyn Kraft)
- Michel Melki – Joël
- Olivia Pascal – Maria
- Philippe Ricci – Luc
- Hubert Berger
