= Jean-Claude Bouillon =

French actor (1941–2017)

- Born: 27 December 1941; Épinay-sur-Seine, France
- Died: 31 July 2017 (aged 75); Marseille, France
- Occupation: Actor
- Years active: 1966–2015

Jean-Claude Bouillon (27 December 1941 – 31 July 2017) was a French actor. He appeared in more than eighty films from 1966 until 2015.

== Filmography ==
Film
Year	Title	Role	Notes
1966	Made in U.S.A	Inspector Aldrich	Uncredited
1969	Tout peut arriver	Philippe Marlot	
1969	Le dernier homme	Jean-Claude, The Husband	
1970	The Mushroom	Eric Calder	
1970	Désirella	Patrick Vernier	
1971	Léa l'hiver	Lenzo	
1971	Un aller simple	Marty	
1971	La cavale	Lucien Lalouette	
1971	Faire l'amour : De la pilule à l'ordinateur		
1972	Hellé	François de Marceau	
1974	Julia	Ralph	
1978	Haro	Guillaume	
1978	State Reasons	Bernard Moulin	
1978	Enfantasme	Dr. Sisti	
1979	Le Divorcement	Antoine	
1980	Operation Leopard	Maurois	
1980	Un escargot dans la tête	Antoine	
1981	Signé Furax	Le pilote	
1988	The Unbearable Lightness of Being		
1990	The March	J.M. Limonier	
1991	Les Enfants du vent	Le père	
1993	Pas d'amour sans amour	Cocktail Guest	
1994	Faut pas rire du bonheur		
1994	Consentement mutuel	Le père de Jeanne	
1997	Arlette	The host	
1998	Un grand cri d'amour	Journalist	
1999	Comme un poisson hors de l'eau	Le directeur de l'hôtel	
2005	Cavalcade	Henri	
2006	The Serpent	Max	
2010	22 Bullets	Me Martinelli	
2011	Coups de soleil		

TV
Year	Title	Role	Notes
1972	Alexander Zwo	Mike Friedberg	TV miniseries
1974–1983	The Tiger Brigades	Commissaire Paul Valentin	36 episodes
1981	Les Roses de Dublin	Christophe Bardol	TV miniseries
1984	Patrik Pacard	Dimitri	TV miniseries
2001	Joséphine, ange gardien	Adrien	1 episode
