= She's 19 and Ready =

1979 film by Franz Josef Gottlieb

- Directed by: Franz Josef Gottlieb
- Written by: Henry Kwan
- Produced by: Karl Spiehs; Wolfgang von Schiber
- Starring: Sabine Wollin; Ekkehardt Belle; Claus Obalski; Gina Janssen
- Cinematography: Franz Xaver Lederle
- Edited by: Gisela Haller
- Music by: Gerhard Heinz
- Production companies: Divina-Film; Geiselgasteig Film; Lisa-Film
- Distributed by: Neue Constantin Film
- Release date: 20 April 1979
- Running time: 89 minutes
- Country: West Germany
- Language: German

She's 19 and Ready (also known as Sunnyboy und Sugarbaby) is a 1979 West German sex comedy film.

== Plot ==
The story centers on a rather uninhibited young woman named Eva (Sabine Wollin) and her two boyfriends - Stefan (Ekkehardt Belle) and Claus (Claus Obalski). Eva needs to decide which of the two is to be her "steady". While pondering that question, Eva inherits some overseas properties from a rich uncle. The three of them embark on a world tour to exotic places, meeting up with Eva's cousin Britta (Gina Janssen) along the way. At the film's conclusion, Eva's "choice" is to keep both young men as beaus.

== Cast ==
- Sabine Wollin as Eva
- Ekkehardt Belle as Stefan
- Claus Obalski as Claus
- Gina Janssen as Britta

== Soundtrack ==
The film's music soundtrack contained original songs by Gerhard Heinz and also includes the contemporary European hits, "You're the Greatest Lover" by Luv' over the opening credits, "Dschinghis Khan" in a dance club performed by the band themselves and "Slip Away Susie" by Bernie Paul in a music video style sequence during a guest appearance by Bernie himself.

== Airplay ==
The film received a good deal of airplay in the early 1980s on HBO and other cable TV pay channels which sought R-rated programming not available on regular TV.
