= Cola, Candy, Chocolate =

- Directed by: Sigi Rothemund
- Written by: Erich Tomek
- Produced by: Wolfgang von Schiber; Karl Spiehs
- Starring: Olivia Pascal; Philippe Ricci; Christine Zierl
- Cinematography: Franz Xaver Lederle
- Edited by: Eva Zeyn
- Music by: Gerhard Heinz
- Production companies: Lisa Film; Geiselgasteig Film
- Distributed by: Residenz Film
- Release date: 17 May 1979
- Running time: 82 minutes
- Country: West Germany
- Language: German

Cola, Candy, Chocolate is a 1979 West German sex comedy film directed by Sigi Rothemund and starring Olivia Pascal, Philippe Ricci and Christine Zierl.

== Cast ==
- Olivia Pascal as Gaby
- Philippe Ricci as Dr. Andreas Witzig
- Christine Zierl as Christine
- David Auker as Johnny Smith
- Ursula Buchfellner as Carmela
- Roland Astor as Roland
- Ike Lozada as Hotelchef Juanto
- Ruben Tizon as Bischof
- Herbert Fux as Pfarrer Herbert
- Mickey as Schimpanse Jimmy

== Bibliography ==
- Roman Schliesser & Leo Moser. Die Supernase: Karl Spiehs und seine Filme. Ueberreuter, 2006.
