= Julia (1974 film) =

- Directed by: Sigi Rothemund
- Screenplay by: Wolfgang Bauer
- Produced by: Karl Spiehs; Erich Tomek
- Starring: Sylvia Kristel; Jean-Claude Bouillon; Teri Tordai; Gisela Hahn; Ekkehardt Belle
- Cinematography: Heinz Hölscher
- Edited by: Eva Zeyn
- Music by: Gerhard Heinz; Karl Michael Demer
- Production company: Lisa Film
- Distributed by: Constantin Film
- Release date: 1974
- Running time: 83 minutes
- Country: West Germany
- Language: German

Julia (German: Es war nicht die Nachtigall) is a 1974 erotic drama film from West Germany starring Sylvia Kristel.

It was released in France in 1975 and recorded admissions of 403,892.

== Plot ==
Pauli is a sexually frustrated teen surrounded by sexually liberated women who will not give him the time of day. He meets a beautiful virgin, Yvonne, who strongly resists his charms, which compounds his frustration.

On summer holiday, Pauli travels from his boarding school to a small seaside town to visit his family at their villa. On the train, he glimpses the sleeping blonde beauty Yvonne, sits in her compartment, and gets to know her. She later vanishes and has sex with a stranger in the train toilet.

Pauli is thunderstruck at the train station when his father Ralph picks up not only him but also Yvonne, who is obviously his father's mistress. The mood at the villa heats up due to his womanizing father and sexy Yvonne, his crazy grandmother Mimi, his cuckolded uncle Alex, Alex's oversexed lesbian wife Myriam, and the lesbian maid Silvana.

Soon Pauli meets his old neighbor Julia, an 18-year-old beauty. Like Pauli, she is still a virgin, but perhaps this summer they will both lose their innocence. Yet there are several others who are also pursuing Julia, including Pauli's own father.

== Cast ==
- Sylvia Kristel as Andrea (Julia in the English overdub version)
- Jean-Claude Bouillon as Ralph
- Teri Tordai as Yvonne
- Gisela Hahn as Myriam
- Ekkehardt Belle as Pauli (Patrick in the English overdub version)
- Peter Berling as Uncle Alex
- Dominique Delpierre as Hildegard

== Production ==
The film was shot in the summer of 1974, in Verona, and on Lake Wörthersee, Austria and released on 1974-11-28.

== German title ==
The German title "It Was Not the Nightingale" is a allusion to Shakespeare's Romeo and Juliet, Act 3, Scene 5:
Juliet: "Wilt thou be gone? It is not yet near day. It was the nightingale, and not the lark, That pierced the fearful hollow of thine ear."

Sylvia Kristel recreates the balcony scene during the visit to Verona.
