= Die Rosen von Dublin =

- Also known as: Les Roses de Dublin
- Starring: Jean-Claude Bouillon; Pascale Roberts
- Country of origin: France; Germany
- No. of seasons: 1
- No. of episodes: 6

Production
- Running time: 52 min

Original release
- Network: TF1
- Release: 1981 – 1981

Les Roses de Dublin (Die Rosen von Dublin) is a French-German television series.

== See also ==
- List of French television series
