= Sadomania =

1981 film

- Italian theatrical release poster
- Directed by: Jesús Franco
- Starring: Ajita Wilson; Andrea Guzon; Ursula Buchfellner; Antonio Mayans; Uta Koepke; Gina Janssen
- Music by: Jesús Franco
- Release date: 1981
- Running time: 103 / 84 minutes
- Countries: Spain; West Germany
- Language: Spanish

Sadomania (El infierno de la pasión) is a 1981 West German-Spanish women in prison film directed by Jesús Franco, starring Ajita Wilson. It was also released as Hellhole Women, Prisoners of the Flesh and Sadomania: The Hell of Passion. The German version (Sadomania – Hölle der Lust) was cut and features a completely different soundtrack

== Plot ==
A couple of newlyweds, Olga and Michael, are traveling along the desert and accidentally trespass on the property of Magda Hurtado, who is the director of "Sadomania", a boot camp of sorts, where the women are treated as slaves and are topless at all times. Magda keeps Olga in captivity while Michael is free to go, but later on in the film he plans an escape for Olga. She goes to work with the other girls out in the hot desert, and the rest of the film is a series of subplots, including one in which a few of the workers are sent out to be hookers, one where a worker participates in a deadly game of cat-and-mouse, and one where the impotent Governor Mendoza buys a couple of the workers to help him perform. There is also a scene where the Governor is finally able to have sex with his wife, but only while watching one of the workers being raped by a dog.

== Cast ==
- Ajita Wilson as Magda Hurtado
- Andrea Guzzon as Mercedes Llorens 'Conito'
- Ursula Fellner as Tara Lindberg
- Antonio Mayans as Governor Mendoza (credited as Robert Foster)
- Uta Koepke as Olga Kowalski
- Angel Caballero as Michael Gordon
- Gina Jansen as Loba Mendoza
