= Alice (1982 film) =

Alicja
- Theatrical release poster
- Directed by: Jacek Bromski; Jerzy Gruza
- Written by: Jacek Bromski; Jerzy Gruza; Judy Raines; Susannah York
- Based on: Alice's Adventures in Wonderland; 1865 novel by Lewis Carroll
- Starring: Sophie Barjac; Jean-Pierre Cassel; Susannah York; Paul Nicholas; Jack Wild; Tracy Hyde; Dominic Guard
- Cinematography: Alec Mills; Witold Sobociński
- Edited by: Bill Blunden
- Music by: Henri Seroka; Lulu
- Distributed by: Zjednoczenie Rozpowszechniania Filmów
- Release date: 29 March 1982
- Running time: 96 minutes
- Country: Poland
- Languages: Polish; English

Alice (a.k.a. Alicja) is a 1982 musical-fantasy film directed by Jacek Bromski. A Belgian and Polish co-production, it is a modern telling of Lewis Carroll's 1865 Alice's Adventures in Wonderland story and stars French actress Sophie Barjac in the title role. Jean-Pierre Cassel plays the jogger named Rabbit with whom Alice falls in love; Susannah York, Paul Nicholas, Jack Wild, Tracy Hyde, Peter Straker and Dominic Guard all have supporting roles.

The film features a musical score by Henri Seroka and lyrics by Gyllianna. Barjac's vocals were dubbed by the Scottish singer Lulu. The film is relatively obscure despite the participation of well-known talent.

== Plot ==
The screenplay draws its inspiration loosely from Carroll's story, but begins with Alice witnessing a murder.

== Cast ==
- Sophie Barjac as Alice
- Jean-Pierre Cassel as Rabbit
- Susannah York as Queenie
- Paul Nicholas as Cheshire Cat / Caterpillar
- Lulu as Alice (singing voice)
- Tracy Hyde as Mona
- Jack Wild as Mock Turtle
- Dominic Guard as Gryphon
- Peter Straker as Mad Hatter
- Marc Seaberg as March Hare
- David Toguri as Duchess

== Music ==
All of the main cast have singing parts, with the exception of Barjac whose vocals were performed by Lulu. She is featured as a soloist on three songs: "Hello My Friend", "Love is the Answer", and "Maybe I'm In Love Again"; and in duet and ensemble performances of several other songs. The complete soundtrack was released as a double LP in Poland, with a selection of excerpts also released on cassette.

== Release ==
The film was internationally released as Alice or Alicja; and to German-speaking audiences under the title Alicja im Horrorland. In 1986 it was released on VHS in the United States and Canada by Karl-Lorimar Home Video, and later on an English-language DVD in Poland with Polish and French subtitles, packaged with an accompanying soundtrack CD.

== Reception ==
The film is considered a curiosity "worth seeking out" "(f)or anyone who’s a Lulu fan". This version is also said to emphasize Carroll's obsessiveness. Leonard Maltin found it "entertaining". A retrospective review of the DVD version praised the music and choreography but is very negative about all the rest, the plot in particular, deemed non-existent.
