= The Hunter Will Get You =

- Directed by: Philippe Labro
- Screenplay by: Philippe Labro; Jacques Lanzmann
- Story by: Philippe Labro
- Starring: Jean-Paul Belmondo; Bruno Cremer
- Cinematography: Jean Penzer
- Edited by: Jean Ravel
- Music by: Michel Colombier
- Production companies: Cerito Films; Simar Films
- Release date: March 17, 1976 (France)
- Running time: 100 minutes
- Country: France

The Hunter Will Get You (French: L'Alpagueur) is a French action film written and directed by Philippe Labro and starring Jean-Paul Belmondo in the title role and Bruno Cremer as L'Epervier.

== Plot ==
As one of the character is saying at the beginning of the movie:

L'alpagueur c'est un chasseur de tête, c'est un mercenaire, un marginal. L'alpagueur c'est l'astuce qu'a trouvé un haut fonctionnaire pour passer au-dessus de la routine policière.

The alpagueur is a head hunter, a mercenary, a marginal. The alpagueur is a trick made up by a state employee to be above the cop's routine.

Originally a deer hunter, l'Alpagueur became a head hunter working for the police, paid by them with money stolen from criminals. The main plot revolves around l'Alpagueur's pursuit of l'Épervier, (Sparrowhawk) a bank robber and an assassin, who kills whoever sees him commit a crime. His technique is to pay a young and naive man to be his accomplice and kill him right after. One of his accomplices, Costa Valdez, is only wounded during one of his hold ups, and with his help, l'Alpagueur manages to find l'Épervier at the end.

== Cast ==
- Jean-Paul Belmondo as "L'Alpagueur" aka Roger Pilar aka Johnny Lafont
- Bruno Cremer as Gilbert aka L'Epervier
- Patrick Fierry as Costa Valdes
- Jean Négroni as Spitzer
- Victor Garrivier as Inspector Doumecq
- Jean-Pierre Jorris as Julien Salicetti
- Claude Brosset as Granier
- Marcel Imhoff as Chief of Cabinet
- Jacques Dhery as prison warden

== Production ==
Following the poor box office performance of Le Hasard et la Violence (1974), director Philippe Labro returned to more commercially safe genre with the polar. The director came up with the idea of the character called L'Alpaguerur, a bounty hunter who is in unofficial service of the French government. The name L'Alpaguerur comes from the slang verb "alpaguer" meaning to catch or arrest someone.

Labro and his regular collaborator Jacques Lanzmann penned a screenplay titled Des Animaux dans la jungle (lit. 'Animals in the Jungle'). On December 10, 1974, Jacuqes Éric Strauss' Président Films purchased the original script, which by then was already renamed L'Alpagueur (lit. 'The Catcher'). When the script was sent to Jean-Paul Belmondo, he requested that it be rewritten to add "more energy and twists" and "more dimension to the various characters and the themes of solitude and friendship. After Belmondo's project with Claude Pinoteau was cancelled, Belmondo bought back the rights for the film and decided to produce the film through his own company Cerito Films, the first time his own company would do this. It would secretly be a co-production with Simar Films.

== Release ==
The Hunter Will Get You was released in France on March 17, 1976. It had 1,533,183 spectators in France, making it reach 19th spot in the French Box Office of 1976.

It was released in the United States in Tallahassee on November 26, 1982. It was released on DVD and blu-ray by Kino Lorber on September 28, 2021.

== See also ==
- List of French films of 1976
