= Martine Sarcey =

French actress (1928–2010)

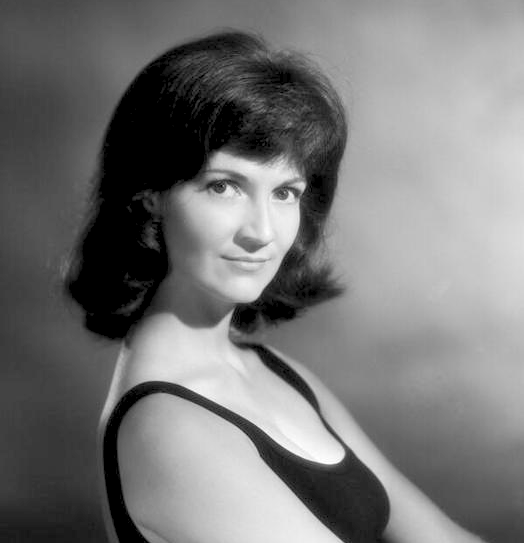
- MartineSarcey-StudioHarcourt-1965
- Born: 28 September 1928; Paris, France
- Died: 11 June 2010 (aged 81); Paris, France
- Occupation: Actress
- Years active: 1952-2010

Martine Sarcey (28 September 1928 – 11 June 2010) was a French stage, film and television actress.

== Selected filmography ==
- Matrimonial Agency (1952)
- Méfiez-vous, mesdames (1963)
- The Thief of Paris (1966)
- The Private Lesson (1968)
- Rendezvous at Bray (1971)
- Un linceul n'a pas de poches (1974)
- Clérambard (1976)
- À nous les petites Anglaises (1976)
- Parisian Life (1977)
- Holiday Hotel (1978)
- Two Lions in the Sun (1980)
- Profs (1985)
- The Light (2004)

== Bibliography ==
- Amanda Giguere. The Plays of Yasmina Reza on the English and American Stage. McFarland, 2014
