= Burning Rubber =

- Directed by: Norman Cohen
- Written by: Dale Cutts
- Starring: Alan Longmuir; Olivia Pascal; Sascha Hehn; Peter J. Elliott
- Cinematography: Keith Jones
- Distributed by: CIC
- Release date: 1981
- Running time: 85 minutes
- Country: West Germany
- Language: English

Burning Rubber is a 1981 feature film starring musician Alan Longmuir (of the Bay City Rollers) and Olivia Pascal. Longmuir plays Henry Carsten, a race car driver. The picture was filmed in South Africa. Three other former members of the Bay City Rollers are also in the cast.
