= Vanessa (1977 film) =

- Directed by: Hubert Frank
- Written by: Kurt Nachmann as Joos De Ridder
- Produced by: Karl Spiehs
- Starring: Olivia Pascal
- Cinematography: Franz Xaver Lederle
- Edited by: Mimi Werkmann, Eva Zeyn
- Music by: Gerhard Heinz, Mathilde Basedow
- Release date: March 10, 1977
- Running time: 91 minutes
- Country: West Germany
- Language: German

Vanessa is a 1977 German softcore erotic melodrama film starring Olivia Pascal and directed by Hubert Frank. Vanessa was the first movie shown on The Playboy Channel.

== Plot ==
Vanessa Anden is a misfit student at a Bavarian convent. After the death of her uncle Richard, she travels to Hong Kong to assume ownership of her uncle's estate. When she arrives, Prinz Bandor, a taxi driver later revealed to be a magician, delivers her to Richard's palatial home. There, she meets Jackie, the niece of Richard's attorney and closest friend, Anthony Grüder. Jackie's sister Cle is married to the wealthy Major Kenneth Cooper. Cle engages in a series of open extramarital affairs in an attempt to get Kenneth to divorce her.

Vanessa learns she has inherited a chain of bordellos and a large citrus plantation, but the plantation administrator, Adrian, claims to be Richard's illegitimate son and has contested the will. Adrian invites Vanessa to the plantation to persuade her to give it to him. He then attempts to rape Vanessa, but Kenneth intervenes. Adrian's servant Tai-Neh, who is in love with Adrian, becomes furiously jealous of Adrian's interest in Vanessa. Tai-Neh uses sympathetic magic to cause Vanessa agony and leave her sick in bed. Jackie, suspecting magic, enlists Prinz Bandor's aid. Bandor perceives Tai-Neh's magic is the source of Vanessa's pain and counters it.

The court rejects Adrian's challenge and awards the entire estate to Vanessa. Adrian tries to convince Vanessa he loves her, but Vanessa fires him. Vanessa decides to keep the plantation but has Anthony sell all the brothels, thus becoming very wealthy. Kenneth invites Vanessa to her home, drugs her and sexually assaults her. Jackie, Adrian and Cle arrive as he does so, and Adrian rescues Vanessa. Kenneth asks Cle to come back to him, but she refuses. Vanessa hires Adrian to run the plantation again and returns to Europe, leaving open the possibility of a future relationship.

== Cast ==
- Olivia Pascal as Vanessa Anden
- Anton Diffring as Major Kenneth Cooper (as Anthony Diffring)
- Günter Clemens as Adrian Dijon
- Uschi Zech as Jackie Grüder
- Eva Eden as Clé Cooper
- Henry Heller
- Eva Leuze as Tai-Neh
- Astrid Boner as Oberin (as Astrid Bohner)
- Gisela Krauss as Hilda
- Peter M. Krueger as Anthony Grüder (as Peter M. Krüger)
- Tom Garven as Prinz Bandor

== Production ==
Director Hubert Frank was a last-minute replacement for the intended director, Siggi Götz. Frank shot the film from an incomplete screenplay, which he largely ignored in favor of improvising much of the movie. Producer Karl Spiehs discovered Olivia Gerlitzki, a medical assistant, and cast her in the lead role as Olivia Pascal.

== Reception ==
Vanessa premiered on March 10, 1977.

On Sneak Previews, Gene Siskel made Vanessa his pick for "Dog of the Week", remarking that "Vanessa is more of a travelogue than a sex show, and what sex there is is tentative, nervous, and unerotic."

Reviewing the film at DVDTalk, Gerry Putzer described "Vanessa" as "[h]ardly a good movie," but "nevertheless watchable" as an artifact of 1970s cinematic erotica. The German film site Filmlexikon called "Vanessa" an "elaborately arranged and photographed sex film, contentless and speculative."
