= Thierry Breton =

French businessman and politician (born 1955)

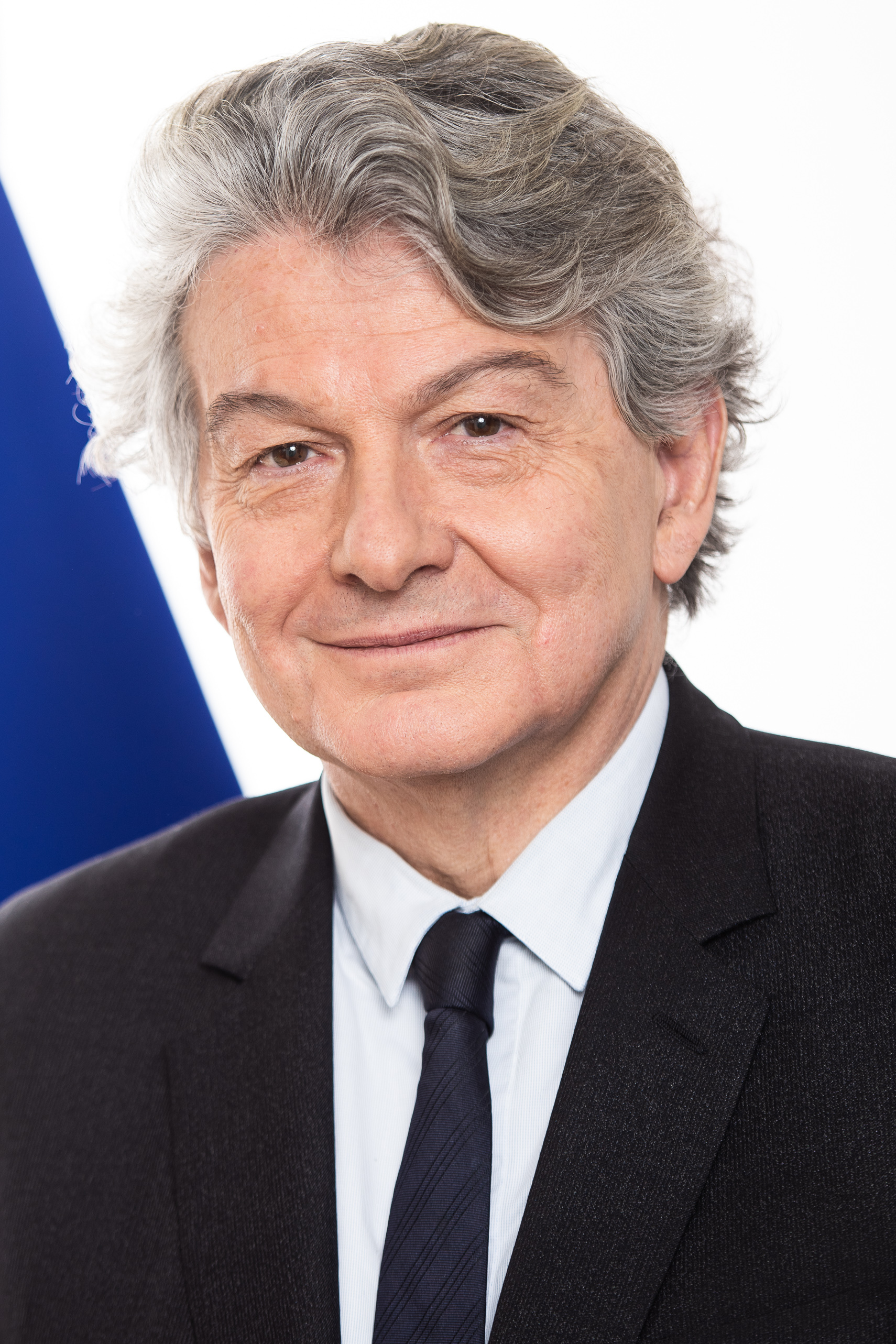
- Official portrait, 2019

European Commissioner for Internal Market
- In office 1 December 2019 – 16 September 2024
- Commission: Von der Leyen I
- Preceded by: Elżbieta Bieńkowska
- Succeeded by: Margrethe Vestager (caretaker)

CEO of Atos
- In office 10 February 2009 – 31 October 2019
- Preceded by: Philippe Germond
- Succeeded by: Bertrand Meunier (as President); Élie Girard (as Director-General)

Minister of the Economy, Finance and Industry
- In office 25 February 2005 – 18 May 2007
- Prime Minister: Dominique de Villepin
- Preceded by: Hervé Gaymard
- Succeeded by: Jean-Louis Borloo

CEO of France Télécom S.A.
- In office 2 October 2002 – 27 February 2005
- Preceded by: Michel Bon
- Succeeded by: Didier Lombard

Personal details
- Born: Thierry Jacques Lucien Breton; 15 January 1955 (age 71) Paris, France
- Citizenship: France; Senegal (2015–present)
- Party: Independent (2015–2019; 2024–present)
- Other political affiliations: RPR (1986–2002); UMP (2002–2015); Renew (2019–2024)
- Spouse: Nicole-Valérie Baroin (m. 1981)
- Children: 3
- Education: École alsacienne Lycée Louis-le-Grand
- Alma mater: Supélec; Institut des hautes études de défense nationale

Thierry Jacques Lucien Breton (French pronunciation: [tjɛʁi bʁətɔ̃]; born 15 January 1955) is a French business executive, politician, and writer who served as European Commissioner for Internal Market in the first von der Leyen Commission from 2019 to 2024. Breton was vice-chairman and CEO of Groupe Bull (1996–1997), chairman and CEO of Thomson-RCA (1997–2002) and chairman and CEO of France Télécom (2002–2005). In 2005, he entered politics, serving as minister for economy, finance and industry (2005–2007) in the governments of prime ministers Jean-Pierre Raffarin and Dominique de Villepin, during the presidency of Jacques Chirac. From 2007 to 2008 he was a professor at Harvard Business School, before joining group Atos from 2009 to 2019 as its CEO.

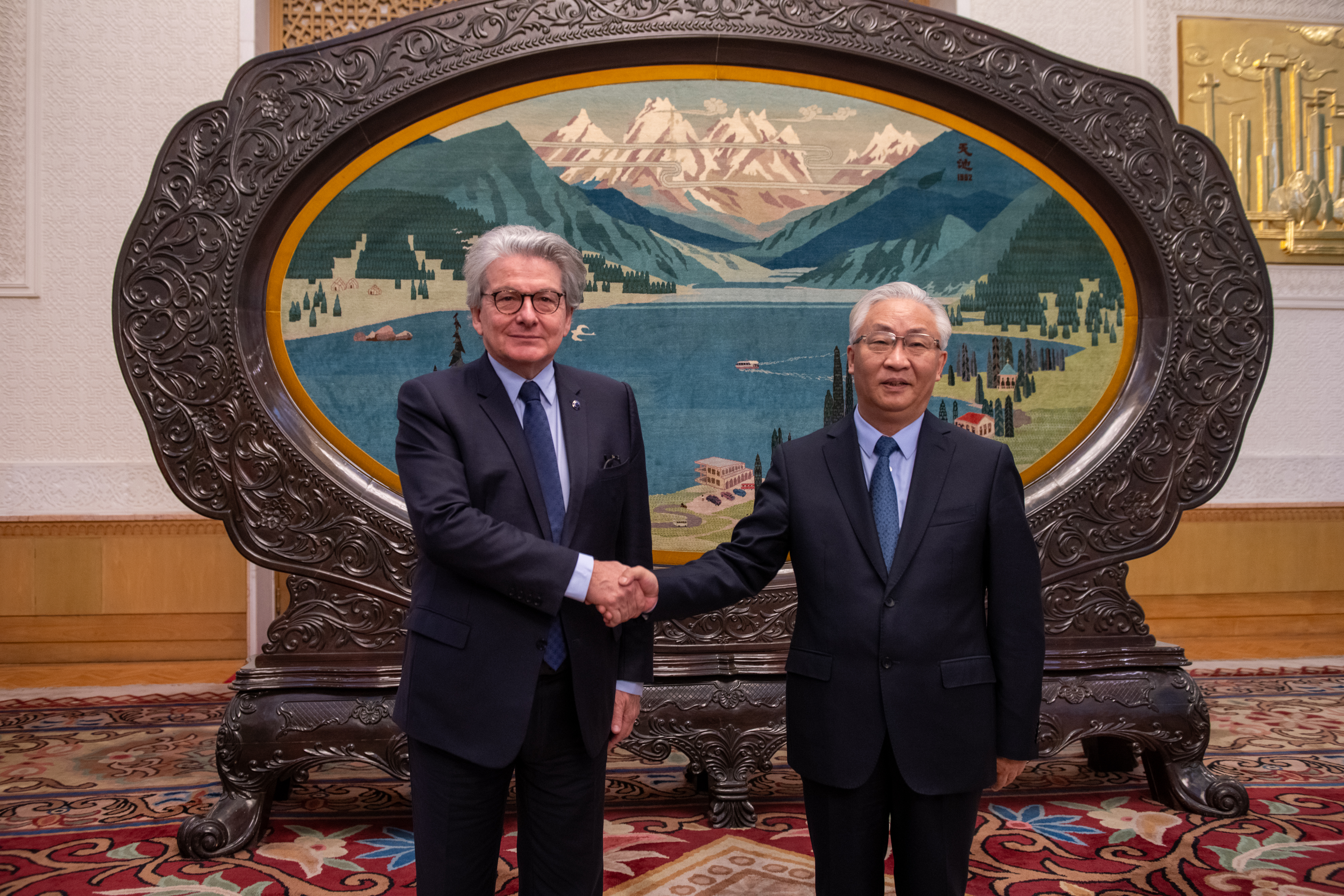
Breton with Chinese Vice Premier Zhang Guoqing in Beijing, China, 10 November 2023

From 2019, Breton served as the European Commissioner for Internal Market under the presidency of Ursula von der Leyen, an appointment that met with controversy, as he was considered by anti-corruption association Anticor to be at serious risk of conflicts of interest over his previous posts at France Télécom and Atos. Breton resigned from the position in 2024.

== Early life and education ==
Breton was born in the 14th arrondissement of Paris. His father was a civil servant in the agency responsible for developing nuclear energy. He completed his middle and high school education at the École alsacienne in Paris and university-preparatory school classes for the grandes écoles at Lycée Louis-le-Grand.

Breton received a master's degree in electrical engineering and computer science from École Supérieure d'Électricité (Supélec, now CentraleSupélec) in 1979 and later graduated from the Institut des hautes études de défense nationale (IHEDN).

== Career in business ==
Breton began his career in 1979 as a teacher of IT and mathematics at the Lycée Français de New York as part of his military service through cooperation. In 1981 he created Forma Systems, a systems-analysis and software-engineering company of which he became CEO until 1986.

In 1986 Breton became adviser to the French minister for education and research René Monory and designed the open-air science and technology theme park Futuroscope. From 1990 to 1993, he was managing director of CGI Group, a global information technology company.

=== Groupe Bull ===
In 1993, the French government hired Breton to help turn around troubled national computer maker Groupe Bull. As second in command, he managed to restructure the stock-market listed company and in 1996 became vice president of the board of directors. He is widely credited with pulling Bull from the edge of bankruptcy.

=== Thomson ===
In 1997, the French government named Breton chairman and CEO of Thomson Multimedia, a state-owned consumer-electronics company that was on the verge of collapse. A year before France's prime minister Alain Juppé unsuccessfully tried to sell the company to South Korea–based Daewoo for a single franc.

Breton made stock offerings to generate cash and diversified the company's businesses, figuring that consumer-electronics products were not high-end enough to consistently earn profits over the long term. Breton involved Thomson in interactive television, electronic publishing, and the Internet, as well as the higher-margin business of digital film-editing services. Thomson began manufacturing televisions with built-in software to run the electronic reference.

Thomson's new ventures instilled investors with renewed confidence in the company and allowed Breton to attract big name companies such as Microsoft, Alcatel-Lucent, NEC, and the DirecTV division of Hughes Electronics. By 1999 Thomson was turning a $230 million profit on sales of $6.5 billion. By the time Breton left in 2002, revenues had increased by more than 80 percent and Thomson was outperforming Sony, Matsushita, and Philips, its major consumer-electronics competitors.

He was named Honorary President of the company in September 2002 following his departure for France Télécom.

=== France Télécom ===
Widely acclaimed as a "turnaround whiz", Breton was named by French government as head of multinational telecommunications corporation France Télécom on 2 October 2002.

In the previous year, the company's share price had fallen about 70% while debts had ballooned to 60 billion euros ($54bn). A risky acquisition strategy that included mobile phone operator Orange, data carrier Equant and Internet service provider (ISP) Freeserve as well as several new, third-generation mobile phone licences had left France Telecom with the infamous title of the world's most indebted listed company.

When Breton took over share prices were less than 7 euros. Two months after his arrival these share prices had risen by 170%. He launched Ambition FT 2005 and generated a three-tiered plan that called for cutting costs to increase cash flow, refinancing debt, and generating $16 billion from shareholders through a capital increase, all in efforts to save $30 billion over three years.

The operator was simultaneously facing an intensification of the competition in its long-time market of France, as well as a demand from the ARCEP to unbundle ADSL. As a response to these challenges Breton notably ended Orange's venture on the stock market and took back complete control over the subsidiary and its earnings.

In July 2003 he launched the plan Broadband internet for all with the objective of providing broadband to 90% of the French population. To do this he increased spending in the innovation sector by 20% and launched the charter Innovative Departments to speed up the development of broadband in rural areas. The following year the company recorded more than 7000 patents filed in France and abroad. In the same year France Télécom reintegrated with Wanadoo to integrate fixed telephony and service provider activities. In July 2004 Breton announced the launch of Livebox, the operator's first Triple Play offer and France Télécom would become the first organisation to implement the concept of integrated operator.

In September 2004 the French government finalised the privatisation of France Télécom on which it had been working progressively since 1996. However, in accordance with the law of 31 December 2003 proposed and supported by Breton, the specific status of the employees was maintained.

When he left the company for the Ministry of the Economy in February 2005 the share price was 23 euros. In less than three years the company's debt was reduced to less than 40 billion euros. He was named as Honorary President of France Télécom.

In January 2010 the Harvard Business Review first published a list of "The 100 Best-Performing CEOs in the World" which was based on an academic study comparing the performances of the heads of industry of the 2,000 biggest global companies, in their relevant fields, from 1995 to 2009. Breton held the 62nd position for his term as CEO of France Télécom.

=== Atos ===
After two years of government service (2005–2007) Breton became in November 2008 the executive chairman and CEO of privately owned Atos S.A., formerly Atos Origin. On the announcement of his nomination the share price, which was previously valued at 18 euros, rose by 7.84%.

In 2008 Atos generated a sales revenue of 5.5 billion euros with a headcount of 50,000 employees but according to Breton was "managed too compartmentally" and the company's inferior profitability margins compared to those of its competitors required a complete transformation plan.

In July 2011 Breton orchestrated the acquisition of the IT activities of German industry group Siemens, which allowed the company to rank number one among the European IT services players and in the Top 5 worldwide, with 75 000 employees in 42 countries. The deal, valued at €850m ($1.1bn), was the biggest Franco-German transaction since an alliance between Germany's premium carmaker Daimler and France's Renault early that year. The operation was lauded by the financial markets and the Atos share price rose by 11.6%.

With the integration of 28,000 engineers Atos became one of the most important Franco-German industrial collaborations since Airbus, illustrated particularly by a financial partnership (Siemens took 15% of Atos' capital), and a common investment fund of 100 million euros was created as well as a joint response to international tenders. This strategy was awarded the prize for Industrial cooperation by the Franco-German Chamber of Commerce and Industry.

In 2012 Breton adopted the Societas Europaea for Atos which gave the company two headquarters, one in France and a second in Munich, Germany. Furthermore, he participated in other European institutional projects in which the Franco-German partnership played a central role such as the European Commission's European Cloud Partnership (2012–2014), over which he co-presided with Jim Snabe, the co-CEO of the German software company SAP.

In May 2014 Breton launched a friendly takeover of French historic IT industry player Bull, turning Atos into the number one European company and one of the major global players in Big Data and Cybersecurity. This acquisition, again commended by the markets (Atos’ share price rose by 6.2% and Bull's by 21.9% the day of the announcement) notably allowed the company to position itself in the supercomputing segment and to become the sole European manufacturer.

Six months later Breton announced Atos' acquisition of Xerox's IT outsourcing activities as well as a strategic partnership with the American company. This operation, which was viewed favorably by the stock market, made Atos one of the five largest digital companies in the world. The company had doubled in size within six years, with a headcount of around 100,000 employees. Breton received world attention after an interview with the Wall Street Journal in 2011 when he reiterated his intention to ban internal email, dubbed as "the pollution of the information age", at Atos within 18 months (known as the zero-email strategy), replacing internal emails by a set of enterprise social networks, enterprise instant messaging, collaborative tools et cetera, both being developed in-house and partially aggregated from other vendors.

In May 2015 the company's market capitalization rose to 7.29 billion euros, an increase of more than 5 billion euros compared with November 2008 when Breton took over. The market share price of Atos grew by 268% in five years.

In October 2018 Atos announced the acquisition of Syntel Pvt. Lmt., an Indian company.

== Minister for finance ==
Having already been proposed twice to succeed Nicolas Sarkozy as finance minister, Breton was appointed on 24 February 2005 while at France Télécom, replacing Hervé Gaymard. At the time, he was the country's fourth finance minister within just one year.

During his two and a half years at the head of Bercy, Breton centred his economic policy on the need to reform public finances, specifically to reduce debt. In June 2005 he declared that France lives beyond its means, a sentiment echoing the words of Prime Minister Raymond Barre in 1976. He stated to the French people that the entirety of their income tax would serve only to finance the interest payments on the national debt. A month later he set up a commission presided over by BNP Paribas CEO Michel Pébereau which was given the task of breaking the pattern of public debt.

He stipulated the maintenance of public deficit below a level of 3% of GDP in 2005 and 2006 as his primary goal. At the end of 2005 France's deficit fell to 2.9% of its GDP after three consecutive years of surpassing the figure of 3%. In 2006 the public deficit was further reduced to 2.5% and public debt was recorded to have dramatically fallen to 63.9% of GDP. For the first time since 1995 the country's budget was in a situation of primary surplus. At the same time France's GDP rose by 2.1% in 2006 compared with 1.7% in 2005.

In October 2005 Breton proposed a law on "the modernization of the economy" which was voted in the same year and looked to prioritize SMEs’ access to financial markets, encourage research and promote giving employees a stake in the company's outcomes. On this occasion he also announced himself in favor of the status of the Societas Europaea being written into French legislation to allow businesses to operate throughout the EU on the basis of a unified set of financial rules.

At the same time he led a reform for fiscal simplification which attempted to reduce the number of tax brackets from seven to four and put in place a pre-filled internet-based declaration of revenues.

During this period he unveiled the concept of the tax shield, which he would initiate in 2006 at a level of 60% excepting health insurance and social debt reimbursement. This was taken up again by Sarkozy in 2007 with a lowering of the level to 60% and an inclusion of health insurance and social debt reimbursement.

Breton wanted France to be the first country to move forward in developing its immaterial heritage. In March 2007 he entrusted a report to Maurice Lévy and Jean-Pierre Jouyet on the economy of the immaterial, with the goal of creating an agency for the immaterial heritage of the state, whose ambition would be to valorize the state's immaterial assets (use of image; brands etc.). This one-of-a-kind agency was put in place on 23 April 2007. This immaterial heritage was recorded as 10 billion euros worth of assets in the state's annual report in 2010.

By February 2007 the unemployment rate was 8.4%, the lowest recorded since June 1983.

Breton finished his term on 15 May 2007 at the end of Jacques Chirac's five-year term. The handover of power to Jean-Louis Borloo, named as Minister of the Economy by the newly elected French president Nicolas Sarkozy, took place the following day.

== EU Commissioner ==
In 2019, Breton was nominated by President Emmanuel Macron to become a member of the European Commission for the Internal Market. His portfolio also included defence and space policies. During his tenure, he promoted a strong line against abuses by major digital platforms and oversaw the production of COVID-19 vaccines. He was an outspoken critic of European Commission president Ursula von der Leyen. Breton had been widely expected to serve a second term in the European Commission. However, he resigned with immediate effect on 16 September 2024 after accusing von der Leyen of blocking his renomination to his portfolio. Stéphane Séjourné was nominated by President Macron for the new Commission mandate.

On 23 December 2025, United States Secretary of state Marco Rubio sanctioned Breton, who masterminded the European Union Digital Services Act. Breton has become persona non grata in the United States of America, thus forbidden to enter the Territories of the United States by the Trump administration, "over what it said was 'censorship' and coercion of US social media platforms".

== Other activities ==
In 2008, Breton was considered for chairing Protectinvest, a private foundation in Belgium set up by billionaire Bernard Arnault to safeguard the integrity of the LVMH group until 2023.

=== International organizations ===
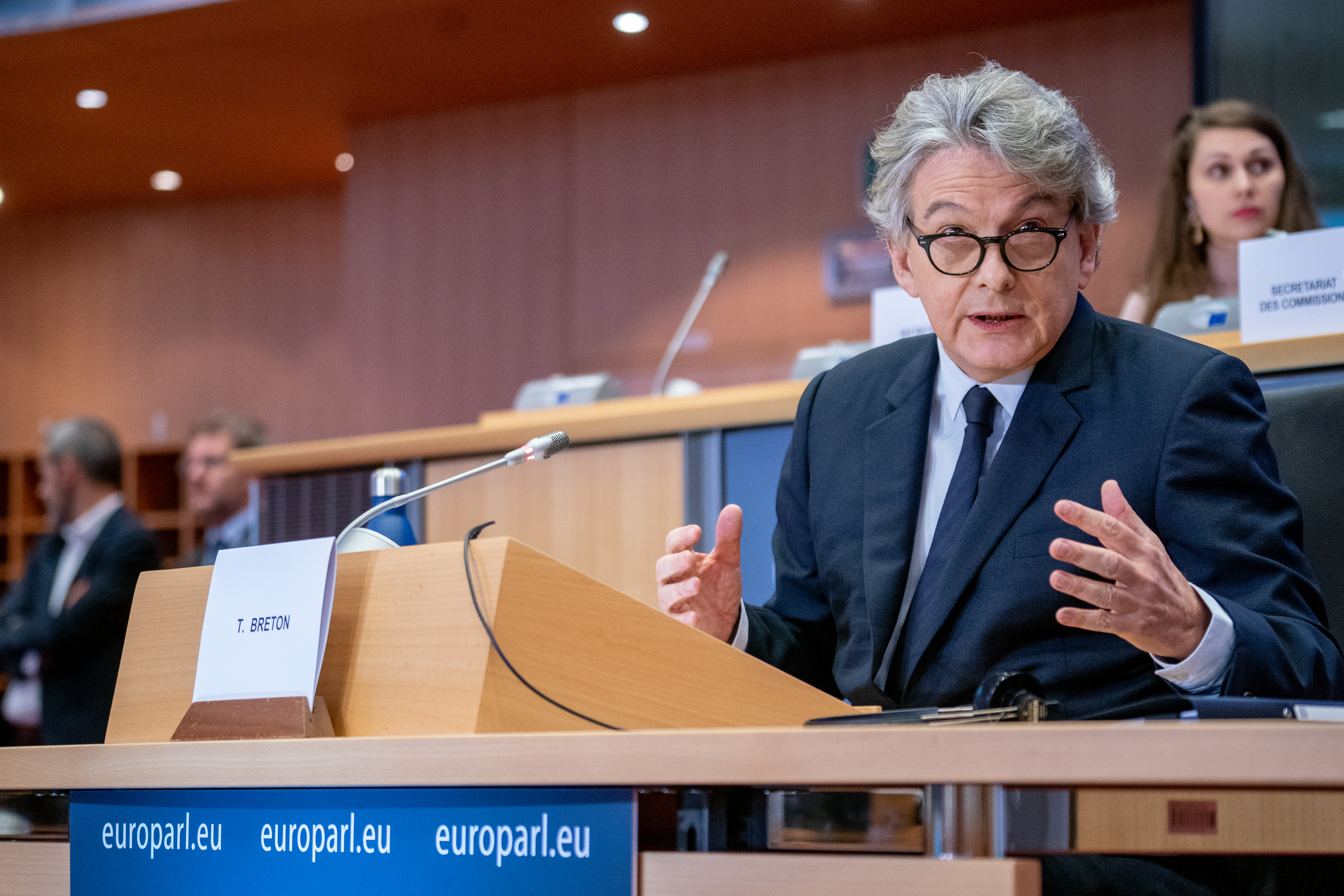
Breton speaks before committees of the European Parliament at his confirmation hearing for European Commissioner for the Internal Market in 2019.

- Asian Development Bank (ADB), ex officio Member of the Board of Governors (2005–2007)
- European Bank for Reconstruction and Development (EBRD), ex officio Member of the Board of Governors (2005–2007)
- European Investment Bank (EIB), ex officio Member of the Board of Governors (2005–2007)
- International Monetary Fund (IMF), ex officio Member of the Board of Governors (2005–2007)

=== Corporate boards ===
- Sonatel, Independent Member of the Board of Directors (2016-2019)
- Bank of America, Member of the Global Advisory Council (2013–2019)
- SATS Ltd., Member of the Board of Directors (2015–2018)
- Worldline SA, Chairman of the Board of Directors (2014–2019)
- Carrefour, Independent Member of the Board of Directors (2008–2019)
- Rhodia, Member of the Board of Directors (–2005)
- Groupe Bull, Chairman of the Board of Directors (2004–2005)
- AXA, Member of the Board of Directors (2001–2005)
- La Poste, Member of the Board of Directors
- Dexia, Member of the Board of Directors (2000–2005)
- Schneider Electric, Member of the Board of Directors (2000–2005)

=== Non-profit organizations ===
- French Academy of Technologies, Member
- Global Talent Competitiveness Index (GTCI), INSEAD, Member of the Advisory Board (2013)
- Harvard Business School, Member of the European Advisory Board
- University of Technology of Troyes, Chairman (1997–2005)

== Academic career ==
After leaving the government, Breton briefly worked as senior lecturer at Harvard Business School (2007–2008), where he taught Leadership and Corporate Accountability (LCA).

== Author ==
He is the author of many books about information technology and economy, and co-author of a novel about cyberspace.

- 1984 : Softwar, The Emergence of Computer Virus as a weapon of mass destruction (La Guerre douce), Thierry Breton – Denis Beneich, éd. Robert Laffont, Paris; (translated in 25 countries).
- 1985 : Vatican III, The emergence of a World made of information based Communities, Thierry Breton, éd. Robert Laffont, Paris
- 1987 : Netwar, The Networks War (La guerre des réseaux), Thierry Breton, éd. Robert Laffont, Paris
- 1991 : La Dimension invisible, The Emergence of Information Society (Le défi du temps et de l'information), Thierry Breton, éd. Odile Jacob, Paris
- 1992 : La Fin des illusions, The end of the Geek Age, Thierry Breton, Plon, Paris.
- 1993 : Le Télétravail en France, An early description of Teleworking in France, Thierry Breton, La Documentation française, Paris.
- 1994 : Le Lièvre et la Tortue, France and The Knowledge Revolution, Thierry Breton – Christian Blanc, éd. Plon, Paris.
- 1994 : Les Téléservices en France, An early description of the internet world, Thierry Breton, La Documentation française, Paris.
- 2007 : Antidette, How to reduce the over spending and major indebtedness of France, Thierry Breton, Plon, Paris.

== Recognition ==
In his homeland Breton is a Commander of the Légion d'honneur and a Grand Officer of the Ordre national du Mérite. He is also a member of Le Siècle.

On 24 April 2018, Breton was among the guests invited to the state dinner hosted by US president Donald Trump in honour of president Emmanuel Macron at the White House.

=== Decorations ===
- Brazil: Grand Officer of the Order of the Southern Cross (2006)
- Chile: Grand Cross of the Order of Merit (2006)
- France: Commander of the Order of the Legion of Honour (2015; Officer in 2008; Knight in 1997)
- France: Grand Officer of the National Order of Merit (2012; Commander in 2004; Officer in 2001; Knight in 1993)
- Morocco: Commander of the Order of Ouissam Alaouite (2010)
- Spain: Commander of the Order of Civil Merit (2006)

=== Awards ===
- 2015: Montgelas Prize, for outstanding actions in favor of French-German cooperation, Munich, Germany.
- 2012: Les Echos Strategist of the Year
- 2002: La Tribune Strategist of the Year

=== Honours ===
- 2001: Honorary Citizen of the City of Foshan, Guangdong Province, China

== Controversies ==
In late 2005, French police carried out at least a dozen raids – including on Breton's office – in connection with complaints about accounting irregularities at Rhodia between 1999 and 2004 and in connection with the sale of assets by the pay-television company Canal Plus to the electronics company Thomson.

On 1 April 2021, Breton told the media that no vaccines would be exported from the EU unless Astrazeneca fulfills its obligations towards the EU. This prompted outrage from the British government, who claimed to have invested heavily in a factory in the Netherlands to produce vaccines for the UK. The UK threatened to block exports of the raw ingredients to the EU should their position not change. Breton and von der Leyen were described as "vaccine pirates" on social media, despite production and export figures in established news sources showing otherwise. In an attempt to resolve the issue, Breton initiated negotiations between all involved parties, i.e. the CEO of AstraZeneca Pascal Soriot, and the Dutch, Leiden-based AZ subcontractor vaccine plant, HALIX. During these meetings, it emerged that AstraZeneca had conceded that all but one batch of the plant's vaccines would stay in the EU.

On 12 August 2024, Breton urged X and Elon Musk to censor an interview with former US president Donald Trump.

== Personal life ==
Breton has been married to journalist Nicole-Valerie Baroin since 1981. They have one son and two daughters, with grandchildren living in Berlin. Breton speaks some German.

In 2015, Senegalese president Macky Sall granted Breton and his wife Senegalese citizenship (in addition to their French citizenship) in recognition for their commitment to the country over a period of thirty years.

In July 2019, two men wearing ski masks and gloves and wielding handguns broke into Breton's Paris home, beat him and locked him up along with his wife and their live-in chauffeur. The thieves made off with a diamond bracelet worth €50,000 and several hundred euros in cash.

In 2023, Breton purchased Gargilesse Castle in Gargilesse-Dampierre from a local painter, Annick Thévenin, who had bought the castle in 1998 to use as an art gallery. Breton is not planning to live there and intends to keep it as a cultural space.

Political offices
Preceded by Hervé Gaymard	Minister of the Economy, Finance and Industry; 2005–2007	Succeeded by Jean-Louis Borloo
Preceded by Pierre Moscovici	French European Commissioner; 2019–2024	Succeeded by Stéphane Séjourné
Preceded by Elżbieta Bieńkowska	European Commissioner for Internal Market; 2019–2024	Succeeded by Stéphane Séjourné
