= Inn of the Sinful Daughters =

- Directed by: Walter Boos
- Written by: Hanns Kräly (story); Walter Boos; Werner P. Zibaso
- Produced by: Horst Hächler
- Starring: Gina Janssen; Dagobert Walter; Claus Richt
- Cinematography: Ernst W. Kalinke
- Edited by: Karl Aulitzky; Inge Moritz
- Production company: CTV 72 Film und Fernsehproduktion
- Release date: 24 November 1978
- Running time: 86 minutes
- Country: West Germany
- Language: German

Inn of the Sinful Daughters (German: Das Wirtshaus der sündigen Töchter) is a 1978 West German sex comedy film directed by Walter Boos and starring Gina Janssen, Dagobert Walter and Claus Richt. It is one of numerous films to use a storyline inspired by the play Kohlhiesel's Daughters by Hanns Kräly.

== Cast ==
- Gina Janssen as Lilli/Christl
- Dagobert Walter as Flori
- Claus Richt as Rudi
- Dorle Buchner as Barbara
- Eva Gross as Helga Huber
- Kalle Möllmann as Billy
- Peter Linow as Götz
- Robert Seidl as Franzl
- Jacques Herlin as Maxi Huber 'Immobilien-Huber'
- Claus Sasse
- Rainer Häuselmayer as Knecht
- Minja Vojvodić
- Gaby Mayser
- Sylvia Engelmann as Mädchen in Disco
- Margitta Hofer as Federballspielerin
- Ingeborg Moosholzer as Restaurantgast

== Bibliography ==
- Ludewig, Alexandra. Screening Nostalgia: 100 Years of German Heimat Film. transcript Verlag, 2014.
