= Irgendwie und Sowieso =

- Starring: Ottfried Fischer; Olivia Pascal; Elmar Wepper; Michaela May; Robert Giggenbach
- Country of origin: Germany

Irgendwie und Sowieso is a German television series.

== See also ==
- List of German television series
