= Ursula Buchfellner =

German model and actress (born 1961)

Playboy centerfold appearance
- October 1979
- Preceded by: Vicki McCarty
- Succeeded by: Sylvie Garant

Personal details
- Born: 8 June 1961 (age 65) Munich, West Germany
- Height: 5 ft 6 in (1.68 m)

Ursula Buchfellner (born 8 June 1961) is a German model and actress. She was Playboy magazine's Playmate of the Month for its October 1979 issue. Her centerfold was photographed by Peter Weissbrich.

Buchfellner also was the Playmate for the December 1977 issue of Playboy's West German edition, being only 16 at the time when the photos were taken (and she was 16 in relation to the edition in which her photos were published, in December 1977). In November 1985 she became the first Playmate to go on to appear in Penthouse magazine.

International acting and modeling careers followed Buchfellner's Playboy appearance. She was sometimes credited as Uschi Buchfellner, Ursula Fellner, Ulla Maris and Ursula Maris.

She starred mainly in European B-movies such as Devil Hunter (1980) and Sadomania (1981). Later on she also featured in renowned German television serials, like Derrick.

== Early life and education ==
Buchfellner was born 3rd of 10 children in Munich. Her father was an alcoholic. For the first 3 years the family lived in a post-war shelter for the poor, until the "Hasenbergl" housing projects were built. Their apartment had running water and a toilet, but shared a bath on the floor. When her mother had twins, she and another sibling were sent to a children's home during the week and saw their family only on weekends. She has described how hunger was a constant experience especially towards the end of the month when money got tight.

After finishing 9th grade (Hauptschulabschluss) her mother found her a training spot in a bakery, and she was allowed to bring home remnants in a paper bag.

== Career ==
In 1977 a Playboy photographer asked her if she was interested to become a playmate. After researching what this entailed, she agreed. When media wrote about her, the baker's wife asked her to leave the bakery. The wages she earned allowed her to invite her older sister for a fried chicken dinner every day.

She stated that, unlike many playmates, she saved most of her money so she was able to buy an apartment in Munich.

After 7 years of modelling, Penthouse invited her to work for them for $80,000. When she saw the photos for Penthouse, she declined.

== Selected filmography ==
- Popcorn and Ice Cream (1978)
- Cola, Candy, Chocolate (1979)
- Devil Hunter (1980)
- Sadomania - Hölle der Lust (1981)

== See also ==
- List of people in Playboy 1970–1979

Candy Loving	Lee Ann Michelle	Denise McConnell	Missy Cleveland	Michele Drake	Louann Fernald
Dorothy Mays	Dorothy Stratten	Vicki McCarty	Ursula Buchfellner	Sylvie Garant	Candace Collins
