= Ajita Wilson =

American actress (1950–1987)

- Image of Wilson
- Born: January 12, 1950; Brooklyn, New York City, U.S.
- Died: May 26, 1987 (aged 37); Rome, Italy
- Occupations: Actress; model
- Years active: 1975–1987

Ajita Victoria Wilson (January 12, 1950 – May 26, 1987) was an American transgender actress who starred in European exploitation and hardcore films in the 1970s and 1980s.

== Biography ==
Wilson was born in either Brooklyn, New York City or Flint, Michigan on January 12, 1950, to Florine, a white Brazilian, and James A. Wilson, an African-American, and assigned male at birth. She began her career as a drag entertainer in the red-light district of New York and underwent gender reassignment surgery in the early 1970s. She was discovered by photographer Bill King, who made her an international model and allowed her to travel the world. Wilson later decided to move to Italy and settled in Milan. In 1976, she took part in her first film, The Nude Princess by Cesare Canevari, inspired by the life of Princess Elizabeth of Tooro. She worked with many genre directors such as Bruno Mattei and Jesús Franco, in erotic and later pornographic films. Many of her Italian films were shot in two versions, one censored for the national market, a more explicit one for the foreign market. Ajita Wilson appeared in the August 20, 1981 issue of African-American weekly Jet Magazine as their Beauty of The Week. In her last years she performed as a singer. Wilson died from a brain hemorrhage that followed a car accident in Rome, Italy on May 26, 1987, at age 37. Her body was transported to the United States and cremated according to the actress's instructions.

== Partial filmography ==
- The Nude Princess (1976) - Princess Mariam
- Gola profonda nera (1977) - Claudine
- Sylvia im Reich der Wollust (1977) - Cula Caballé
- La sorprendente eredità del tontodimammà (1977)
- Mavri Aphroditi (English titles: Black Aphrodite and Blue Passion) (1977) - Tamara
- La bravata (1977) - Jeanette
- D'improvviso al terzo piano (1977)
- Amori morbosi di una contessina (1977)
- L'amour chez les poids lourds (English title: Truck Stop) (1978) - Calypso (uncredited)
- Follie Di Notte aka Joe D'Amato – Follie Di Notte (1978) - Sex Show Performer
- Le notti porno nel mondo nº 2 (English title: Scandinavian Erotica) (1978) - Stewardess
- Proibito erotico (English title: Erotic Fantasies) (1978) - Julie
- Adolescenza morbosa (1978)
- Bactron 317 ou L'espionne qui venait du show (1979) - Barbara
- Una donna di notte (1979)
- Pensione amore - SerVizio completo (1979) - Karina
- Libidine (1979) - Mary
- Los Energéticos (1979) - Carla
- Eros Perversion (1979) - Antonia
- Escape from Hell (1980) - Zaira
- The Smugglers (1980) - Luisa
- Orinoco: Prigioniere del sesso (1980) - Muriel
- Eva man (Due sessi in uno) (1980) - Ajita
- Pensieri Morbosi (English title: Deep Thoughts) (1980) - Prostitute
- Sadomania (1981) - Magda Hurtado / Man Having Sex with Lucas
- Pasiones desenfrenadas (1981) - Enrica
- Erotiki ekstasi (1981) - Sara
- Erotiko pathos (1981) - Samantha
- Apocalipsis sexual (1982) - Liza
- Bacanales romanas (1982) - Venus de Ébano
- Catherine Chérie (1982) - Ajita
- I eromeni (1982) - Monika
- El regreso de Eva Man (1982) - Ajita
- Orgia stin Kerkyra (English Title: The Pussycat Syndrome) (1983) - Donna Washington
- Macumba sexual (1983) - Princesa Obongo
- La doppia bocca di Erika (1983) - Erika
- Corpi nudi (1983)
- Anomaloi erotes sti santorini (1983)
- Perverse oltre le sbarre (1984) - Conchita
- Detenute violente (1984) - Eureka Thompson
- To mikrofono tis Alikis (1984)
- Ta modela tis idonis (1984)
- Stin Athina simera... oles ton pernoun fanera! (1984)
- Kai to proto pinelo (1984)
- Idones sto Aigaio (1984) - Ajita
- Savage Island (1985) - Marla (archive footage)
- Bocca Bianca Bocca Nera (1986) - Ramona
- Diakopes Stin Idra (English Title: Holidays in Hydra) (1986) - (final film role)
