= Peter J. Elliott =

British actor (1930–2016)

- Born: Peter John Henry Elliott; 14 June 1930; Kent, England
- Died: December 2016 (aged 86)
- Years active: 1948–1996
- Children: 1

Peter John Henry Elliott (14 June 1930 – December 2016) was a British film actor, singer, dancer, stunt performer and television presenter.

== Life and career ==
Elliott had been diving since the age of 12 at the Marshall Street swimming pool, when he was approached by Sid Dalton, an Olympic coach. He trained seriously and represented Britain in the Olympic Games of 1948 and 1952, in London, England. He won a bronze medal in high diving at the 1953 Maccabiah Games in Israel.

Elliott later became a pop singer and was a resident ballad singer on ATV's Oh Boy!. He wrote a number of successful film scores, two of which won awards at Cannes Film Festivals.

== Filmography ==
=== Film ===
| Year | Title | Role | Notes |
|---|---|---|---|
| 1971 | Fun and Games | Matthews | |
| 1974 | Those Naughty Angels | Louis Phillips | |
| 1976 | Snake Dancer | Joe Brannigan | |
| 1978 | Slavers | Quiroga | |
| 1979 | Zulu Dawn | Sentry | |
| 1979 | Game for Vultures | Hilton - Rhodesian Patrol | |
| 1979 | The Demon | Mr. Parker | |
| 1980 | Safari 3000 | Stewart Simmons | |
| 1981 | Burning Rubber | Mr. Baumgarten | |
| 1987 | Going Bananas | First Mate / Clown #2 | |
| 1988 | Scavengers | McKenzie | |
| 1988 | It's Murphy's Fault | Chief Brant | |
| 1989 | The Tattoo Chase | Mr. Scalari | |
| 1989 | Wild Zone | Professor Garrison | |
| 1989 | The Tangent Affair | Johnny Fish | |
| 1990 | Barrett | Mont | |
| 1990 | That Englishwoman: An Account of the Life of Emily Hobhouse | John Jackson | |
| 1996 | The Making of the Mahatma | Pretoria Jail Superintendent | |

=== Television ===
| Year | Title | Role | Notes | | | |
|---|---|---|---|---|---|---|
| 1967-1968 | The Avengers | Various | Episode: "A Funny Thing Happened..." | Episode: "You Have Just Been Murdered" | Episode: "Have Guns - Will Haggle" | Episode: "All Done with Mirrors" |
| 1968 | The Champions | Paul Lang (uncredited) | Episode: "The Experiment" | | | |
| 1968 | The Jazz Age | Rollo | Episode: "Tip-Toes" | | | |
| 1969 | Department S | Thorn | Episode: "The Treasure of the Costa Del Sol" | | | |
| 1970 | Randall and Hopkirk (Deceased) | Wilks | Episode: "When the Spirit Moves You" | | | |
| 1970 | Steptoe and Son | | Episode: "Men of Property" | | | |
| 1993 | Tropical Heat | Angel Benedict | Episode: "Spider's Tale" | | | |
