= Escape from Hell (1980 film) =

1980 Italian exploitation film

- DVD cover
- Directed by: Edoardo Mulargia
- Written by: Sergio Chiusi; Roberto Estévez; Anthony La Penna; Edoardo Mulargia
- Produced by: Arturo González
- Starring: Anthony Steffen; Ajita Wilson; Cristina Lau; Cintia Lodetti
- Cinematography: Valverde Mateos Manuel
- Edited by: Eugenio Alabiso
- Music by: Marcello Giombini
- Distributed by: Variety Distribution
- Release date: March 27, 1980
- Running time: 93 minutes
- Language: Italian

Escape from Hell (also known as Hell Prison, I'm Coming Your Way and Femmine infernali) is a 1980 Italian exploitation film distributed by Variety Distribution. The film belongs to the women in prison subgenre.

While not prosecuted for obscenity, the film (titled Hell Prison) was seized and confiscated in the UK under Section 3 of the Obscene Publications Act 1959 during the video nasty panic.

== Plot ==
A group of abused, scantily-clad female prisoners devise a plan to rebel against their oppressors and escape from their penitentiary.

== Cast ==
- Anthony Steffen - Doctor Farrell
- Ajita Wilson - Zaira
- Cristina Lay - Vivienne
- Cintia Lodetti - Katie
- Luciano Pigozzi - The Warden
- Serafino Profumo - Martinez
- Maite Nicote - Mary (credited as Maite Nicott)
- Yael Forti - Marika
- Zaira Zoccheddu - Lucy
- Adelaide Cendra - Female inmate 1
- Angela Martinelli - Female inmate 2
- Gilberto Galimberti - Luis
- Anna Maria Panaro - Marie Antoinette, the madwoman
- Robert Spafford - Martinez (voice) (uncredited)

== Censorship in Britain ==
When submitted for cinema release in Britain in December 1980 under the title Escape From Hell the BBFC refused it a certificate. The following year a heavily edited version, retitled I'm Coming Your Way and running 66 minutes, was passed without further cuts. It was later submitted for VHS in 1988, now retitled Hell Prison and in its complete form, and received 3 mins 46 secs of cuts to scenes of sexual violence.

== Home video ==
The film was released on a double DVD pack with Lust For Freedom, under the title "Nymphos Behind Bars 2 Pack".
