= Ekkehardt Belle =

German actor (1954–2022)

- Born: 18 May 1954; Glehn, Korschenbroich, North Rhine-Westphalia, West Germany
- Died: 31 January 2022 (aged 67); Munich, Bavaria, Germany
- Occupation: Actor

Ekkehardt Belle (18 May 1954 – 31 January 2022) was a German television actor best known for his role as David Balfour in the 1979 HTV production of Kidnapped opposite David McCallum.

He played several roles in the popular TV series Derrick during the 1980s. He was also known for dubbing the role of Robert Baratheon in the German dub of Game of Thrones. He died in Munich on 31 January 2022 at the age of 67 following complications from a surgery.

== Selected filmography ==
- Slaughterhouse-Five (1972)
- Julia (1974)
- Les Faucheurs de marguerites (1974, TV series)
- The Garbage Dump (1975, TV film)
- Victory March (1976)
- Kidnapped (1978, TV miniseries)
- She's 19 and Ready (1979)
- Derrick - Season 7, Episode 5: "Ein tödlicher Preis" (1980, TV)
- Derrick - Season 9, Episode 4: "Die Fahrt nach Lindau" (1982, TV)
- Derrick - Season 9, Episode 6: "Das Alibi" (1982, TV)
- Nesthäkchen (1983, TV miniseries)
- Derrick - Season 11, Episode 4: "Drei atemlose Tage" (1984, TV)
- Derrick - Season 12, Episode 2: "Gregs Trompete" (1985, TV)
