= Die Supernasen =

1983 German comedy film

- Directed by: Dieter Pröttel
- Written by: Thomas Gottschalk; Mike Krüger
- Produced by: Karl Spiehs; Executive producer; Otto Retzer; Erich Tomek
- Starring: Mike Krüger; Thomas Gottschalk
- Cinematography: Fritz Baader; Otto Kirchhoff
- Edited by: Eva Pavlikova; Claudia Wutz
- Music by: Gerhard Heinz
- Distributed by: Astro Distribution
- Release date: 8 September 1983
- Running time: 88 minutes
- Country: Germany
- Language: German

Die Supernasen is a 1983 West German comedy film featuring Thomas Gottschalk and Mike Krüger. The name of the movie, "The Supernoses", refers to both having big noses while at the same time being a malapropism for "Spürnasen", a colloquialism for "investigator".

The two have worked together in the four popular movies making up the so-called Supernasen-series. They were mostly college movies in a German setting - two naughty young men in Bavaria, with beautiful girls and funny complications. Their other collaborations were

- Piratensender Powerplay
- Zwei Nasen tanken Super
- Die Einsteiger

== Plot ==
Tommy and Mike, once again without a job and without money, decide to open the PI agency "Columbo" and work as private investigators. Their first case involves a rich man who wants to know if his wife is cheating, which leads them to Bad Spänzer. Here, they slip into a variety of roles, save their client's marriage, thwart the assassination attempt on a sheik and fall in love with two young women.

== Reception ==
The film was a huge commercial success, selling a total of 2.7 million tickets in Germany, which made it the most successful German-language movie in 1983 and the sixth-most-successful movie in Germany that year.

The film was popular in the German-speaking region and in several Eastern European countries. In Czechoslovakia it was released under the name "Dva supernosáči".

== Releases ==
On February 1, 2019, a remastered Blu-ray was released, featuring the original soundtrack that was not included in previous DVD releases.
