= Gina Janssen =

German actress

- Born: 5 January 1953 (age 73); Munich, Bavaria, West Germany
- Occupation: Actress
- Years active: 1970-1984 (film)

Gina Janssen (born 5 January 1953) is a German former film actress and glamour model. During the 1970s, she starred in a number of sex comedies and also worked with Spanish director Jesús Franco.

== Selected filmography ==
- Kinderarzt Dr. Fröhlich (1972)
- Penelope Pulls It Off (1975)
- Three Bavarians in Bangkok (1976)
- Schulmädchen-Report 10 (1976)
- All Around Service (1976)
- Tänzerinnen für Tanger (1977)
- Agent 69 in the Sign of Scorpio (1977)
- Inn of the Sinful Daughters (1978)
- She's 19 and Ready (1979)
- Sadomania (1981)

== Bibliography ==
- Karen A. Ritzenhoff & Karen Randell. Screening the Dark Side of Love: From Euro-Horror to American Cinema. Springer, 2012.
