= Otto Retzer =

Austrian actor, producer and director (born 1945)

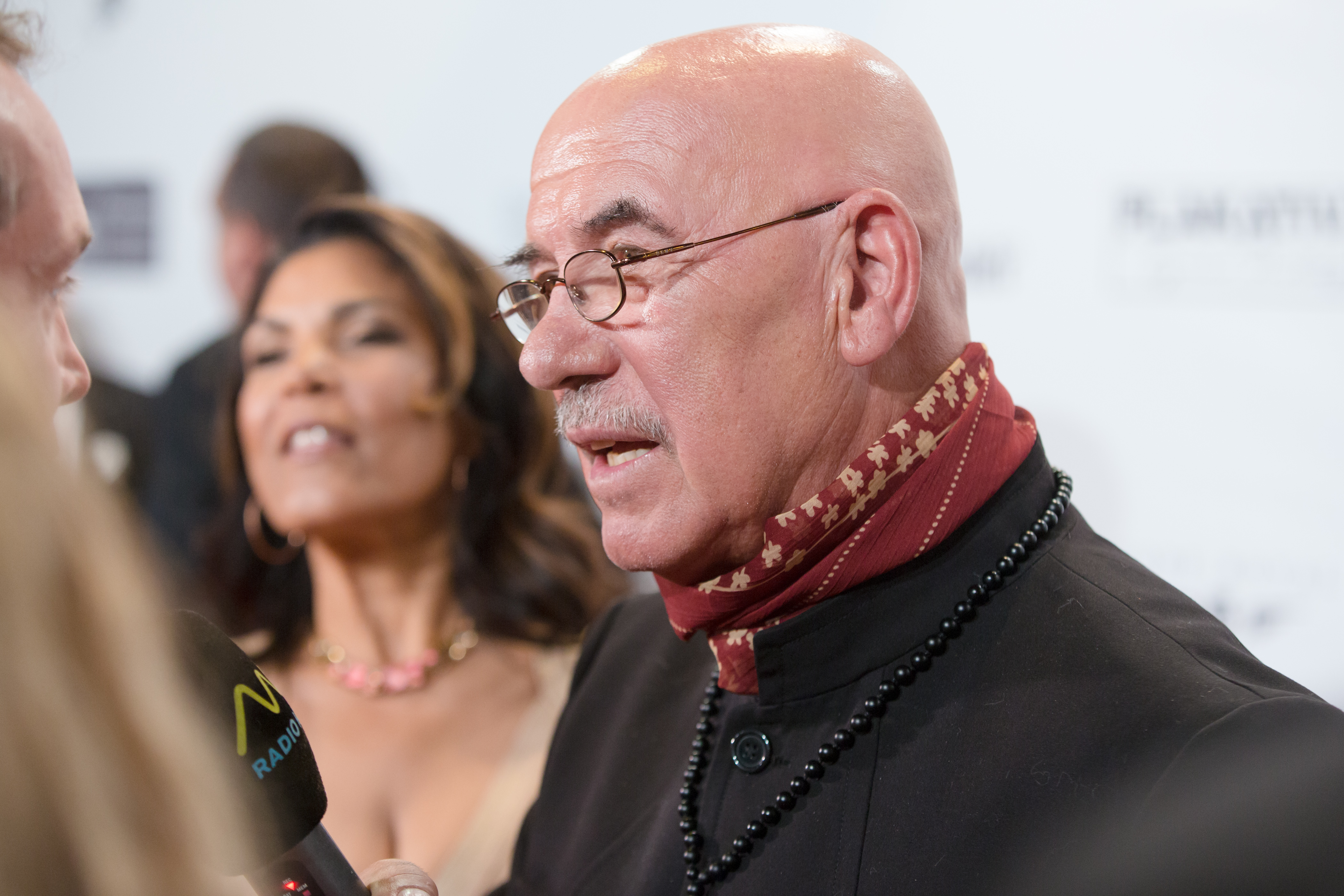
- Retzer in 2016.
- Born: 13 September 1945 (age 80); Lölling, Carinthia, Austria
- Occupations: Producer, actor, director
- Years active: 1971– (film & TV)

Otto Retzer (born 1945) is an Austrian actor, producer and director.

== Selected filmography ==
- Don't Get Angry (1972)
- Alleluja & Sartana are Sons... Sons of God (1972)
- Blue Blooms the Gentian (1973)
- No Sin on the Alpine Pastures (1974)
- The Maddest Car in the World (1975)
- Three Bavarians in Bangkok (1976)
- Sunshine Reggae in Ibiza (1983)
- Die Supernasen (1983)

=== Director ===
- Starke Zeiten (1988)
- Hochwürden erbt das Paradies (1993)
- Hunt for the Blue Diamond (1993), starring Barry Newman, Ernest Borgnine
- At the Edge of Paradise (1993), starring George Hamilton, Morgan Fairchild
- Veterinarian Christine (1993), starring Ernest Borgnine
- Drei in fremden Kissen (1995)
- Ein Richter zum Küssen (1995)
- Veterinarian Christine II: The Temptation (1995), starring Ernest Borgnine
- The Black Curse (1995), starring James Brolin, Deborah Shelton
- Hochwürdens Ärger mit dem Paradies (1996)
- Drei in fremden Betten (1996)
- Die Superbullen (1997)
- Fröhliche Chaoten (1998)
- Die blaue Kanone (1999)
- Hochwürden wird Papa (2002)
- Alles Glück dieser Erde (2003), starring Maximilian Schell
- Heimkehr mit Hindernissen (2012)
- Der Ruf der Pferde (2013)

== Bibliography ==
- Roman Schliesser & Leo Moser. Die Supernase: Karl Spiehs und seine Filme. Ueberreuter, 2006.
