= À nous les petites Anglaises =

1976 French film directed by Michel Lang

- Theatrical release poster
- Directed by: Michel Lang
- Story by: Michel Lang
- Cinematography: Daniel Gaudry
- Edited by: Thierry Derocles
- Music by: Mort Shuman
- Release date: 7 January 1976 (France)
- Running time: 104 minutes
- Countries: France; United Kingdom
- Language: French

À nous les petites anglaises (Let's Get Those English Girls) is a French film directed by Michel Lang, released in 1976.

== Synopsis ==
In the summer, of 1959 two French schoolboys who have failed their English exams are sent on holidays to the South of England. While they are supposed to mainly concentrate on improving their English, they also get to know the local population. However, it is easier to flirt with the other French schoolgirls rather than improving their English proficiency.

== Production ==
The film was shot in Thanet in Kent at Ramsgate where arcades, parks, the Foy Boat, Royal Harbour and the main sands feature throughout the film. Beaches including Botany Bay and Kingsgate Bay were also used and the Port of Dover also features where the boys arrive at the start of the film.

== Cast ==
- Rémi Laurent as Alain
- Stéphane Hillel as Jean-Pierre
- Véronique Delbourg as Claudie
- Sophie Barjac as Véronique
- Michel Melki as Pierrot
- Françoise Engel
- Martine Sarcey
- Rynagh O'Grady as Doreen
- Aïna Wallé
- Eric Deacon as Mike
- David Morris as Dave
