= Softwar =

"Softwar - La Guerre Douce" (in English "Sotfwar, the soft war") is a technothriller novel by Thierry Breton and Denis Baldwin-Beneich published 1984 in French and translated in 10 languages. The English version was published in 1986. The story is about the use of computer viruses and tampered hardware for spying and sabotage by both US and Russian governments. This international bestseller made a larger non-technical public aware of IT security challenges and was therefore referred to in introductory books on that subject,.

== Plot summary ==
The main characters of the novel are Bredan and Ioulia. Bredan is an American professor at the MIT in the field of Information Technology, who was hired by the NSA, in the book the "National Software Agency". Ioulia is a Russian software engineer who happened to be his student in the 80's.

The story starts with France selling to the USSR a meteorological Cray-1 system and the related software. At the occasion of an inspection for export control, NSA agents implement a secret software bomb. The system later breaks down on the exact day of an official visit of the Russian authorities, but mysteriously works again the day after without any repair. Ioulia and her assistant discover that some additional software instructions set the computer out of order when it processes some specific meteorological data related to the Saint-Thomas Island in the US Virgin Islands.

When Ioulia later inspects a second computing system imported from the West, she identifies that there are several abnormalities. Not on the American computer this time, but on the peripheral computers which are of Russian origin. She finds out that all the Russian computers happened to be physically tampered with the installation of an additional processing unit made of a Zilog Z80 microprocessor and two ROMs. When this unit detects the code word "VENIK" at a specific address of the computer's random access memory, it erases everything and blocks the computer.

Ioulia finally understand that the goal of the additional component is to allow the central government to shut down any activity (transports, power plants, industry, ...) that is controlled by the Russian computers in the remote regions, in order to serve as a mean to pressure the local government in case of political or military troubles.

Mikhail Gorbachev, who's not yet president, sends Ioulia to Geneva to publicly condemn the American software bomb at an international summit. Brendan, her ex-lover and professor is instructed to discourage her making these revelations. When both meet, Ioulia tells Brendan about her discovery and asks him to disclose the Russian undertaking to the press, so to force her government to withdraw their control system.

== See also ==
- Cyberwarfare
- Cybersecurity
