= Sophie Barjac =

French actress

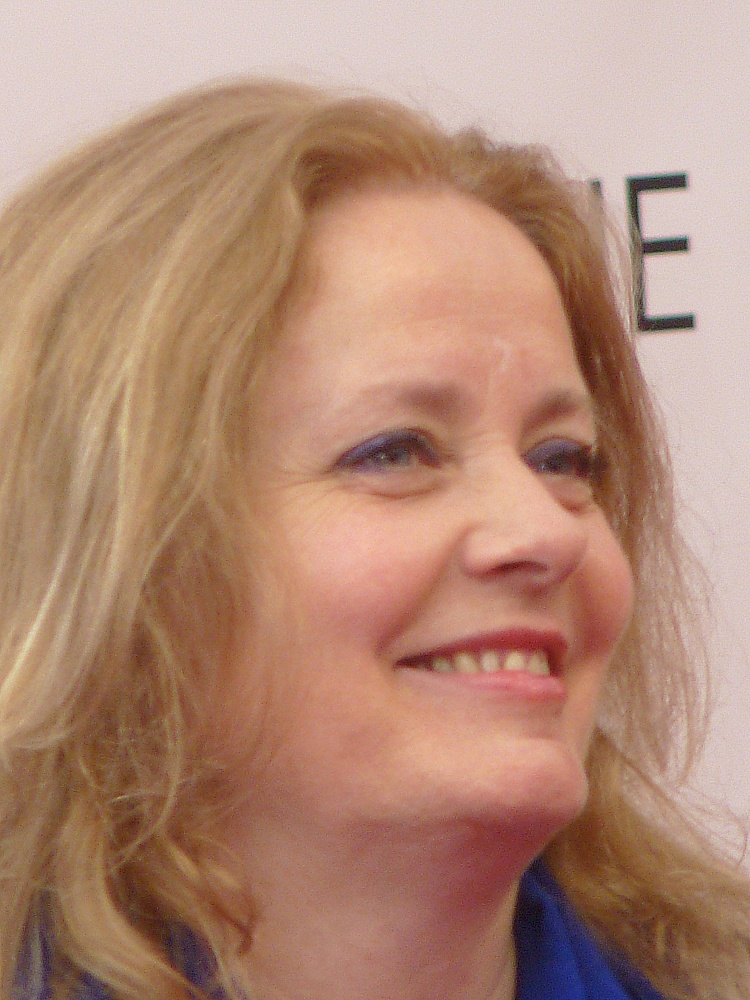
Sophie Barjac

Sophie Barjac (born 24 March 1957 in Bourges, Cher) is a French actress of stage, screen and television. Although most of her work is in the French language (e.g., Holiday Hotel), Barjac has occasionally acted in the English language: the Canadian television series Bordertown (1988–1990) and the Belgian-Polish coproduction Alice (1981).

== Partial filmography ==
- Isabelle and Lust (1975)
- À nous les petites Anglaises (1976)
- Anne, jour après jour (1976)
- Dis bonjour à la dame!.. (1977)
- Holiday Hotel (1978)
- Alice (1982 film) (1982)
- La fiancée qui venait du froid (1983)
- Love on the Quiet (1985)
- Lévy et Goliath (1987)
- Comme si de rien n'était (2003)
- Counter Investigation (2007)
- Nés en 68 (2008)
