= Stéphane Hillel =

French actor

- Born: 8 April 1955 (age 71)
- Occupation: Actor
- Years active: 1976- (film)

Stéphane Hillel (born 1955) is a French stage, film and television actor.

== Selected filmography ==
- À nous les petites Anglaises (1976)
- Arrête ton char... bidasse! (1977)
- The Wonderful Day (1980)

== Bibliography ==
- Jean-François Prévand. Camus, Sartre... et "Les Autres. Editions Lansman, 1996.
