= Arch Taylor =

New Zealand cricketer (born 1941)

Personal information
- Full name: Archibald Robert Taylor
- Born: 26 November 1941 (age 84); Westport, New Zealand
- Batting: Left-handed
- Bowling: Right-arm fast-medium

Domestic team information
- Years: Team
- 1963/64–1965/66: Wellington
- 1975/76–1978/79: Auckland

Career statistics
Competition	First-class	List A
Matches	13	3
Runs scored	131	22
Batting average	11.90	11.00
100s/50s	0/1	0/0
Top score	50	19*
Balls bowled	2730	168
Wickets	52	4
Bowling average	20.30	30.25
5 wickets in innings	3	0
10 wickets in match	0
Best bowling	6/47	2/35
Catches/stumpings	11/–	1/–
- Source: ESPNcricinfo, 7 August 2022

Archibald Robert Taylor (born 26 November 1941) is a New Zealand former cricketer. He played first-class cricket for Wellington in the 1960s and List A cricket for Auckland in the 1970s.

Taylor was a promising right-arm fast-medium bowler who played 13 matches of first-class cricket for Wellington between 1963 and 1966 before his career was interrupted by injury. He resumed as a medium-pace bowler for a few one-day matches for Auckland in the 1970s. In his last match he took two wickets to help Auckland win the final of the Gillette Cup in December 1978. His best first-class figures were 6 for 47 in Wellington's two-wicket victory over Northern Districts in the 1965–66 Plunket Shield.
