= Rémi Laurent =

French actor (1957–1989)

- Born: Rémi François Simon Laurent; 12 October 1957; Suresnes, Paris, France
- Died: 14 November 1989 (aged 32); Paris, France
- Occupation: Actor
- Years active: 1976–1987

Rémi Laurent (12 October 1957 – 14 November 1989) was a French actor who was born in Suresnes, known for playing the son Laurent in La Cage aux Folles (1978). He died in Paris from an HIV-related illness in 1989.

== Biography ==
Laurent was born and raised in the 16th arrondissement of Paris, and was the son of a nursery nurse (his mother) and an agricultural engineer. He learned to play the piano at an early age but decided in his adolescence to pursue comedic acting.

Laurent debuted in the 1976 film À nous les petites Anglaises. He was then featured in a number of popular French films in the late 1970s and most of the 1980s. He is particularly remembered in his role in the 1978 film La Cage aux Folles as Laurent, the son of Renato Baldi (Ugo Tognazzi). He also is remembered in his role as Denis Boucher in the 1981 Québécois film The Plouffe Family directed by Gilles Carle.

He was romantically involved with actress Anne Caudry, who died of AIDS in 1991, then married Emöke Masznyik, a young Hungarian dancer and mime.

He died of AIDS on 14 November 1989 and is interred at Saint-Pourçain-sur-Sioule.

== Filmography ==
Year	Title	Role	Notes
1976	À nous les petites Anglaises (Let's Get Those English Girls)	Alain	
1977	Dis bonjour à la dame	David Ferry	
1977	Arrête ton char... bidasse!	Francis	
1978	La Cage aux folles	Laurent Baldi	
1978	Les Seize ans de Jérémy Millet		Short
1979	C'est dingue... mais on y va	Nicolas	
1980	All Stars	Laurent Dermoncourt	
1981	Les Plouffe	Denis Boucher	
1981	La Cassure	Le frère de Rauffast	
1982	Une glace avec deux boules ou je le dis à maman	Bernard	
1982	Le Cadeau (Bankers Also Have Souls aka. The Gift)	Laurent	
1986	Black Mic Mac	L'inspecteur adjoint	
1987	La Princesse surgelée		Short film (final film role)
