= Emmanuelle 6: One Final Fling =

1994 film by Jean-Jacques Lamore

DVD cover

Emmanuelle 6: One Final Fling (DVD title: Emmanuelle in Space 6: One Last Fling) is a 1994 television movie from the Emmanuelle in Space series featuring several softcore sex scenes mostly between Krista Allen and co-star Paul Michael Robinson. It was directed by Jean-Jacques Lamore, produced by Alain Siritzky, and written by J.C. Knowlton, based on character by Emmanuelle Arsan. The cinematographic was by Andrea V. Rossotto.

== Cast ==
- Krista Allen as Emmanuelle
- Paul Michael Robinson as Captain Haffron Williams
- Tiendra Demian
- Jennifer Burton
- Kimberly Rowe
- Timothy Di Pri
- Brad Nick'ell
- Debra K. Beatty
- Lori Morrissey
- Holly Hollywood
- Reginald Chevalier
- Priscilla Choi
