= Emmanuelle 5: A Time to Dream =

1994 television movie by David Cove

DVD cover

Emmanuelle 5: A Time to Dream is a 1994 television movie, which was the fifth episode from the erotic series Emmanuelle in Space. It was directed by David Cove, produced by Alain Siritzky, and edited by Josefine Anderson. The screenplay was written by Mark Evan Schwartz, based on character by Emmanuelle Arsan.

== Cast ==
- Krista Allen as Emmanuelle
- Paul Michael Robinson as Captain Haffron Williams
- Debra K. Beatty as Cara
- Reginald Chevalier as Pierre
- Timothy Di Pri
- Holly Hollywood as Gee
- Claude Knowlton as Raymond
- Lori Morrissey as Jay
- Brad Nick'ell as Theo
- Kimberly Rowe as Angie
