= Emmanuelle 7: The Meaning of Love =

1994 television movie by Brody Hooper

DVD cover

Emmanuelle 7: The Meaning of Love is a 1994 television movie, which was the seventh episode from the erotic series Emmanuelle in Space. It was directed by Brody Hooper, produced by Alain Siritzky, and written by Thomas McKelvey Cleaver, based on character by Emmanuelle Arsan.

== Cast ==
- Krista Allen as Emmanuelle
- Paul Michael Robinson as Captain Haffron Williams
- Tiendra Demian as Tasha
- Brad Nick'ell
- Kimberly Rowe as Angie
- Timothy Di Pri
- Lori Morrissey as Jay
- Holly Hollywood as Gee
- Reginald Chevalier
- Lee McHugh
