= Emmanuelle 3: A Lesson in Love =

1994 television movie by David Cove

Video cover

Emmanuelle 3: A Lesson in Love is a 1994 softcore television movie, which was directed by David Cove, and produced by Alain Siritzky, based on character by Emmanuelle Arsan. It was the third episode from the Emmanuelle in Space series.

Fresh from Haffron and Theo's sexual experiences, Emmanuelle takes Tasha, a female member of the space crew to exotic locations to learn all about the basic and tantric of pansexuality. Tasha has many sexual experiences, among them are a voyeuristic encounter with a hotel manager and a random act of meaningless sex on a boat.

== Cast ==
- Krista Allen as Emmanuelle
- Paul Michael Robinson as Captain Haffron Williams
- Kimberly Rowe as Angie
- Tiendra Demian as Tasha
- Robert Nassry as Dimitri
- SPC Derek Krueger as Derek, The Boss With The Sauce
