= Emmanuelle in Space =

1994 American television series

- Genre: Erotica, softcore pornography
- Starring: Krista Allen; Paul Michael Robinson
- Country of origin: United States
- Original language: English
- No. of seasons: 1
- No. of episodes: 7 (list of episodes)

Original release
- Release: 1994 – 1994

Emmanuelle in Space is an American erotic science-fiction television series produced for cable and syndication in 1994. It is loosely based upon the character Emmanuelle created by Emmanuelle Arsan in the 1960s and featured in dozens of softcore films over the years. The series was produced by Alain Siritzky, whose production company proceeded to make many Emmanuelle films for screen and TV during the 1990s and 2000s.

== Premise ==
The series starred Krista Allen as Emmanuelle, a hedonistic young woman who finds herself teaching the ways of sexuality to a group of aliens who land on Earth, and Paul Michael Robinson as an alien space captain. The story follows an extraterrestrial space crew that finds Emmanuelle on Earth and enlists her help to understand human love and sexuality.

As is the case with the other Emmanuelle films, Emmanuelle in Space contains much nudity and sexual content. Today, the various episodes of Emmanuelle in Space are generally available edited together into feature-length productions on DVD and occasionally show up on broadcasters such as Cinemax and cable networks outside the U.S.

== Cast and characters ==
- Krista Allen as Emmanuelle: After breaking up with her boyfriend, she is propositioned by Captain Haffron to teach his crew and him about life and sex on Earth. Emmanuelle is bisexual and is very liberal in her sexual endeavors. She soon falls in love with Haffron.
- Paul Michael Robinson as Captain Haffron Williams: The captain of the alien space craft, he propositions Emmanuelle to teach him about sex. He transfers his knowledge to his crew. Haffron was asexual before Emmanuelle arose desire in him. He teaches her view of multiple partners and bisexuality to the others. He becomes somewhat of a serial love maker. He soon falls in love with Emmanuelle, but cannot define his emotions. From Emmanuelle 4: Concealed Fantasy, Haffron is implied to have once been part of a top-secret government project and was monitored.

== Episodes ==
- Emmanuelle, Queen of the Galaxy, also known as First Contact (1994)
- Emmanuelle 2: A World of Desire (1994)
- Emmanuelle 3: A Lesson in Love (1994)
- Emmanuelle 4: Concealed Fantasy (1994)
- Emmanuelle 5: A Time to Dream (1994)
- Emmanuelle 6: One Final Fling, also known as One Last Fling (1994)
- Emmanuelle 7: The Meaning of Love (1994)
