= Joseph Genier =

Joseph P. Genier
- Education: Cornell University (B.S.)
- Occupations: Producer, Production Manager

Joseph P. Genier is an American Producer, Production Manager, member of the directors guild of America, co-founder of Capital Arts Entertainment, and the founder and owner of Push Worldwide. He is best known for producing Tyler Perry's "Madea" movies as well as MTV's Teen Wolf.

== Film career ==
Genier graduated from Cornell University in 1992 with a Bachelor of Science degree in Communications. and began producing films and television shows shortly thereafter. He is now based in Los Angeles since 2010 when Teen Wolf was relocated to Northridge after previous filming in Georgia. He is the head of Production at Capital Arts Entertainment and the owner and founder of Push Worldwide, the distribution arm for Capital Arts.

== Filmography ==
Year	Title	Role
1994	Emmanuelle: First Contact	Production Manager: Second Unit
1994	Emmanuelle 4: Concealed Fantasy	Production Manager: Second Unit
1994	Terminal Voyage	Assistant to Producer
1994	In the Heat of Passion II: Unfaithful	Assistant to Producer
1994	Reflections on a Crime	Production Assistant
1994	Concealed Weapon	First Assistant Director
1995	A Bucket of Blood	Unit Production Manager
1995	Twisted Love	Unit Production Manager
1995	Captain Nuke and the Bomber Boys	Assistant to Producer
1995	Alien Terminator	Key Grip
1995	Virtual Seduction	Unit Production Manager
1996	Justine: In the Heat of Passion	Unit Manager
1996	Showgirl Murders	Unit Production Manager
1996	Baby Face Nelson	Unit Production Manager
1997	Casper: A Spirited Beginning	Unit Production Manager
1998	Salvation	Producer
1998	Richie Rich's Christmas Wish	Unit Production Manager, Line Producer
1998	Addams Family Reunion	Line Producer
1998	Casper Meets Wendy	Line Producer
1998	National Lampoon's Men in White	Line Producer
1998	Freedom Strike	Line Producer
1998	The Cowboy and the Movie Star	Line Producer
1999	Au Pair	Line Producer
1999	Michael Jordan: An American Hero	Line Producer
1999	Dangerous Waters	Line Producer
1999	Mars	Line Producer
2000	Rocket's Red Glare	Line Producer
2000	Time Share	Unit Production Manager, Line Producer
2000	Attraction	Unit Production Manager
2001	Au Pair II	Line Producer
2002	All I Want	Co-Producer
2003	Beethoven's 5th	Line Producer
2003	Rent Control	Producer
2003	Timecop 2: The Berlin Decision	Unit Production Manager, Line Producer
2004	The Cookout	Line Producer
2004	Godsend	Line Producer
2004	The Prince & Me	Associate Producer
2005	American Pie Presents: Band Camp	Unit Production Manager, Line Producer
2005	Down in the Valley	Co-Producer
2005	Tyler Perry's Diary of a Mad Black Woman	Line Producer
2005	The Prince & Me 2: The Royal Wedding	Co-Producer
2006	Peaceful Warrior	Unit Production Manager, Co-Producer
2006	Akeelah and the Bee	Unit Production Manager
2007	The Perfect Holiday	Producer
2007	Tyler Perry's Why Did I Get Married?	Unit Production Manager, Co-Producer
2007	War	Unit Production Manager, Co-Producer
2007	Razortooth	Actor:Scoutmaster Cliff, Producer
2007	Wifey	Producer
2008	Tyler Perry's The Family That Preys	Unit Production Manager, Project Manager, Co-Producer
2008	Outrighteous	Executive Producer
2008	Tyler Perry's Meet the Browns	Unit Production Manager, Co-Producer
2009	Tyler Perry's Madea Goes To Jail	Unit Production Manager, Co-Producer
2010	For Colored Girls	Executive Producer
2010	Tyler Perry's Why Did I Get Married Too?	Co-Producer
2010	Killers	Unit Production Manager
2011	Tyler Perry's Madea's Big Happy Family	Unit Production Manager, Executive Producer
2011	Teen Wolf	Unit Production Manager, Producer: Code Breaker; Formality; Co-Captain; Wolf's Bane; Lunatic; Night School; Heart Monitor; The Tell; Magic Bullet; Pack Mentality; Second Chance at First Line; Wolf Moon
2012	Tyler Perry's Good Deeds	Unit Production Manager, Executive Producer}
