= Emmanuelle 2: A World of Desire =

- DVD cover
- Genre: Softcore Pornography
- Written by: Noel Harrison & Emmanuelle Arsan
- Directed by: Lev L. Spiro (as L. L. Shapira)
- Starring: Krista Allen; Paul Michael Robinson
- Theme music composer: Timothy Wynn
- Country of origin: France
- Original language: English

Production
- Producer: Alain Siritzky
- Cinematography: Andrea V. Rossotto
- Editor: Helen Hywater
- Running time: 92 minutes
- Production companies: ASP S.A. Oranton Ltd. Riouw Beleggingen BV

Original release
- Release: 1994

Related
- Emmanuelle: First Contact; Emmanuelle: A Lesson in Love

Emmanuelle 2: A World of Desire is a 1994 television movie from the Emmanuelle in Space series featuring several softcore sex scenes mostly between Krista Allen and co-star Paul Michael Robinson. It was directed by Jean-Jacques Lamore, produced by Alain Siritzky, and written by J.C. Knowlton, based on character by Emmanuelle Arsan. The cinematographic was by Andrea V. Rossotto.

== Cast ==
- Krista Allen as Emmanuelle
- Paul Michael Robinson as Captain Haffron Williams
- P.S. Sono as The Abbot
- Kimberly Rowe as Angie
- Brad Nick'ell as Pierre
- Reginald Chevalier as Raymond
- Angela Cornell as Angela "Sexy Angela"
- Debra K. Beatty as Cara
- Holly Hollywood as Gee
- Lori Morrissey as Jay
- Steve Michaels as Dirk
- Tami Simsek as Madame Sylvia
