= Emmanuelle 4: Concealed Fantasy =

1994 television film by Kevin Alber

Video cover

Emmanuelle 4: Concealed Fantasy is a 1994 television movie, which was the fourth episode of the erotic series Emmanuelle in Space. It was directed by Kevin Alber, and written by Thomas McKelvey Cleaver, based on character by Emmanuelle Arsan.

Haffron and Emmanuelle continue their erotic lessons and partake in many global and sexual pleasures while seeing the world. Both explore the advantages of different partners and the delight in pursuing one's wildest desires, but Haffron has trouble being monogamous while becoming very jealous of men whom Emmanuelle finds attractive.

== Principal cast ==
- Krista Allen as Emmanuelle
- Paul Michael Robinson as Haffron
- Tiendra Demian as Tasha

== Production crew ==
- Alain Siritzky – producer
- John Lewis – composer
- Andrea V. Rossotto – cinematographer
- Brett Hedlund – film editor
