= Marcela Walerstein =

Venezuelan actress

- Born: Marcela Walerstein Martín; 1971 (age 54–55)
- Occupation: Actress
- Parent: Mauricio Walerstein
- Relatives: Gregorio Walerstein (grandfather)

Marcela Walerstein Martín (born in San Fernando de Apure, Apure 1971) is a Venezuelan actress.

== Biography ==
Walerstein is of Mexican and Ashkenazi origin on her father's side, and Cuban and Yugoslavian on her mother's side. She comes from a family of film lovers and is the granddaughter of Gregorio Walerstein and daughter of Mauricio Walerstein. In 1989, she was elected Miss Apure, which allowed her to participate in the prestigious Miss Venezuela contest, where she was disqualified. She then pursued a career as an actress and model. She rose to prominence when she played Emmanuelle, a character created by novelist Emmanuelle Arsan, in a series of erotic films based on the movie Emmanuelle.

== Filmography ==
=== Film ===
- 1991: Jet Marbella Set
- 1991: Solo o en compañía de otros (Gabriela)
- 1991: El amor sí tiene cura
- 1991: Los platos del diablo (Lisbeth Dorante)
- 1993: El laberinto griego (Tamara)
- 1994: La leyenda de la doncella (Rosalía)
- 1994: Una chica entre un millón (Carla)
- 2001: El cielo abierto (Sara)
- 2001: Manolito Gafotas en ¡Mola ser jefe! (Trudi)
- 2005: Las llaves de la independencia (María)

=== Television ===
- 1993: Emmanuelle eterna (television movie): Young Emmanuelle
- 1993: La venganza de Emmanuelle (television movie): Young Emmanuelle
- 1993 : Emmanuelle en Venecia (telefilme) : Young Emmanuelle
- 1993 : El amor de Emmanuelle (television movie): Young Emmanuelle
- 1993 : Emmanuelle mágica (television movie): Young Emmanuelle
- 1993 : El perfume de Emmanuelle (television movie): Young Emmanuelle
- 1993 : El secreto de Emmanuelle (television movie): Young Emmanuelle
- 1994 : Canguros (television series)
- 1999 : Ellas son así (television series) : Greta
