= Emmanuelle =

- Emmanuelle character
- Photo of Sylvia Kristel used to promote the 1974 film Emmanuelle
- First appearance: Emmanuelle (1967 novel)
- Created by: Emmanuelle Arsan
- Portrayed by: Sylvia Kristel (1974–1984, 1993); Mia Nygren (1984); Monique Gabrielle (1987); Natalie Uher (1988); Marcela Walerstein (1993); Noémie Merlant (2024)

In-universe information
- Gender: Female
- Spouse: Jean
- Children: Diana, Emily, Eve-Ladah
- Nationality: French

Emmanuelle is the lead character in a series of French erotic films based on the protagonist in the novel of the same name, by Emmanuelle Arsan, written in 1959 and published in 1967.

Emmanuelle originated as the pen name Emmanuelle Arsan, used by Marayat Rollet-Andriane, a French-Thai actress who wrote a 1957 book, The Joys of a Woman, detailing the sexual exploits of a bored housewife. The first Emmanuelle film debuted in 1974 and starred Sylvia Kristel, who became synonymous with the role. The film embraced its X-rating and became a success, with an estimated audience of 300 million. It remains one of France's most successful films. The films' explicit content varied from softcore to full hardcore, though no penetration or oral sex made it to publicly available releases.

It spawned a film series with multiple sequels, and a video game. The original series consists of six theatrical films and seven made-for-television films, while a reboot was released in 2024. Emmanuelle was also the inspiration for several unrelated films and series, including the Italian series Black Emanuelle, or the American series Emmanuelle in Space, as well as many unofficial productions using the Emmanuelle name, capitalizing on the craze.

== Character history ==
Emmanuelle appeared as the pen name of Marayat Rollet-Andriane, a French-Thai actress (1932–2005). Her 1957 book The Joys of a Woman detailed the sexual exploits of Emmanuelle, the "bored housewife" of a French diplomat. Rollet-Andriane's book caused a sensation in France and was banned.

Ovidio Assonitis, the producer of another Arsan/Rollet-Andriane film titled Laure, claimed that all books published under the pen name Emmanuelle Arsan were written by her husband, Louis-Jacques Rollet-Andriane, rather than by Marayat.

== Development ==
Emmanuelle
- Created by: Emmanuelle Arsan (novel); Jean-Louis Richard (1974 film)
- Owners: StudioCanal (original series); Pathé (reboot)
- Years: 1974–present
- Based on: Emmanuelle (novel)

Print publications
- Novel(s): Emmanuelle series by Emmanuelle Arsan (1959–1988)
- Comics: Emmanuelle by Guido Crepax (1978)

Films and television
- Film(s): List of films

Games
- Video game(s): Emmanuelle (1989)

The first Emmanuelle film was the 1974 French theatrical feature Emmanuelle starring Dutch actress Sylvia Kristel (1952–2012) in the title role. She came to be the actress best identified with the role. This film pushed the boundaries of what was then acceptable on screen, with sex scenes, skinny-dipping, masturbation, the "Mile High Club", rape, and a scene in which a dancer lights a cigarette and puffs it with her vagina. This film was created and directed by French director Just Jaeckin.

Unlike many films that tried to avoid an X-rating, the first Emmanuelle film embraced it, and became a success with a viewing audience estimated at 300 million. It remains one of France's most successful films, and played in the Arc de Triomphe theatre for over eleven years. In France and the US the film was uncut, but British censors balked at masturbation and explicit sex. Heavy cuts were made to the film including the complete removal of the opium den rape and the infamous 'cigarette' sequence in the club.

Several sequels starring Kristel followed, beginning with Emmanuelle 2 known as Emmanuelle: The Joys of a Woman in its U.S. release, and also Emmanuelle l’antivierge in some European press materials, including the soundtrack LP and CD. Kristel sold her interest for $150,000, missing on a share of the film's $26m domestic gross. She was paid $6,000 for her role but negotiated a $100,000 contract for the sequel, Emmanuelle 2.

Kristel stepped away from the role in the 1980s, yielding to younger actresses, but returned for the seventh feature film. In 1992 and 1993, Kristel reprised the role of an older Emmanuelle for a series of made-for-cable films with titles such as Emmanuelle's Love and Emmanuelle's Perfume, which featured Marcela Walerstein as a younger version of Kristel's character. Kristel did not take part in any love scenes for this series, which also co-starred George Lazenby, also in a non-sexual role. Kristel also appeared in films throughout her career that capitalized on or parodied her Emmanuelle image, such as the American sex comedy Private Lessons.

A number of unofficial productions in Italy, Japan and the United States cashed in on the Emmanuelle craze, changing the spelling of the title. In a number of cases, the character's name was spelled "Emanuelle" suggesting these films were not authorized. Among the best known were Italian "Black Emanuelle" films starring Laura Gemser, who became the second most popular actress to play Emanuelle in the 1970s. The 1978 spoof Carry On Emmannuelle (with double "N") starred Kenneth Williams as the French ambassador to London. Having lost his libido by landing on a church spire during a parachute jump, he discovers his sex-starved wife, Emmannuelle Prevert, has seduced a string of VIPs. It starred Suzanne Danielle in the title role.

After the last official Emmanuelle theatrical feature film, Emmanuelle au 7ème ciel (the seventh film for which Kristel returns as the main character), ASP began to produce further films, all featuring the character of Emmanuelle, albeit played by a series of actresses. These included a science fiction series in the 1990s called Emmanuelle in Space starring American actress Krista Allen in one of her first roles. Following spinoffs included TV series Emmanuelle 2000 starring Holly Sampson, TV and video series Emmanuelle's Private Collection starring Natasja Vermeer, and a one-off, Emmanuelle in Rio, starring Ludmilla Ferraz in her only acting credit.

At the 2008 Cannes Film Festival, Alain Siritzky said he was looking for a new Emmanuelle, with production on the first film scheduled to begin in September. It was announced at the 2011 Cannes Film Festival that Allie Haze (performing under the alias Brittany Joy) had been chosen. The direct-to-video series that starred Allie Haze was titled Emmanuelle Through Time.

It was announced at the 2022 Cannes Film Festival that a new reboot of the series was to get a cinematic release, written and directed by Audrey Diwan and featuring Noémie Merlant playing Emmanuelle. This version is set for release in 2024 with a distribution deal confirmed for several countries including France and the United States of America.

=== Box office ===
The film played to packed houses in Paris, running for years. Emmanuelle was also an international hit and has played to 300 million. French distribution company Studio Canal has acquired home video rights for a number of Emmanuelle movies and has released remastered DVDs of the films. Taking video and DVD into account revenue is estimated close to 650 million.

=== Explicit content ===
The sexual explicitness in Emmanuelle films varies from arty softcore to full hardcore, although no penetration or oral sex made it to public versions. Many question the place of hardcore scenes in Emmanuelle and ASP never attempted to mix the two genres after experimenting in the late 1980s.

- Emmanuelle 4 (1984), starring Kristel and new Emmanuelle Mia Nygren, had hardcore scenes shot, but they were never used. These scenes, which did not involve the main actors, were included in television versions and turned up as extras on European DVD editions of Emmanuelle 4 and in a version called "Emmanuelle 4X" on a VHS in France in the 1980s.
- Emmanuelle 5 (1987), directed by Walerian Borowczyk, was released in two versions: one with softcore love scenes, and a French home video version that extended several scenes with hardcore sex directed by Borowczyk (apparently Borowczyk said that he had not directed them). The scenes are the Love Express and dance studio segments, embellished with penetration, ejaculation and a woman urinating. This VHS version omits several minutes of footage seen in the public version (including dialogue and plot).
- Emmanuelle 6 (1988) also had two hardcore scenes (one short without ejaculation, but with fellatio and penetration, between a man and a woman whom Emmanuelle watches in a horse box, and the second longer, with fellatio, penetration and ejaculation, starring the same couple entering the place where Emmanuelle is being held prisoner at the end of the movie), directed by erotic horror specialist Jean Rollin. However, they were not used in the theater version, but were included on a hardcore VHS version in France.

== Film appearances ==
Year	Title	Actress(es)	Director	Series	Country
1969	A Man for Emmanuelle (Io, Emmanuelle)	Erika Blanc	Cesare Canevari		Italy
1973	Swap Meet at the Love Shack (Emanuelle Meets the Wife Swappers)	Monica Marc (Note: Although the actress portrays an Emmanuelle-esque character as its title suggests, no one explicitly named Emmanuelle actually appears in the film.)	Hubert Frank		Germany
1973	Tender and Perverse Emanuelle	Norma Kastel	Jesús Franco		France
1974	Free Love (The Real Emanuelle)	Laura Gemser	Pier Ludovico Pavoni		Italy
1974	Emmanuelle	Sylvia Kristel	Just Jaeckin	Emmanuelle	France
1974	The Erotic Diary of a Lumberjack (Erotic Daughters of Emanuelle)	Willeke van Ammelrooy	Jean-Marie Pallardy		France
1975	The Daughter of Emanuelle	Greta Vayan	Jean Luret		France
1975	Tokyo Emmanuelle	Kumi Taguchi	Akira Katō		Japan
1975	Tokyo Emmanuelle: Private Lessons	Kumi Taguchi	Katsuhiko Fujii		Japan
1975	Emanuelle's Revenge (Emanuelle and Françoise)	Rosemarie Lindt	Joe D'Amato		Italy
1975	Black Emanuelle	Laura Gemser	Bitto Albertini	Black Emanuelle	Italy
1975	Emmanuelle 2	Sylvia Kristel	Francis Giacobetti	Emmanuelle	France
1976	Laure (Forever Emanuelle)	Annie Belle	Emmanuelle Arsan		Italy
1976	Blue Belle (Teenage Emanuelle)	Annie Belle	Massimo Dallamano		Italy
1976	Emmanuelle's Silver Tongue	Nadia Cassini	Mauro Ivaldi		Italy
1976	Emanuelle in Bangkok	Laura Gemser	Joe D'Amato	Black Emanuelle	Italy
1976	Emmanuelle on Taboo Island	Laura Gemser	Enzo D'Ambrosio		Italy
1976	Black Emanuelle 2	Shulamith Lasri	Bitto Albertini	Black Emanuelle	Italy
1976	Black Cobra Woman (Emmanuelle Goes Japanese)	Laura Gemser	Joe D'Amato		Italy
1976	Black Velvet (Black Emmanuelle, White Emmanuelle)	Laura Gemser & Annie Belle	Brunello Rondi		Italy
1976	Passion Plantation (Emmanuelle Black and White)	Malisa Longo	Mario Pinzauti		Italy
1976	Néa (A Young Emmanuelle)	Ann Zacharias	Nelly Kaplan		France
1976	The Margin (Emmanuelle '77)	Sylvia Kristel	Walerian Borowczyk		France
1977	The Dragon Lives Again	"Jenny"	Law Kei		Hong Kong
1977	Hong Kong Emmanuelle	Deborah Dik	Wah Man		Hong Kong
1977	Yellow Emanuelle	Chai Lee	Bitto Albertini		Italy
1977	Emanuelle in America	Laura Gemser	Joe D'Amato	Black Emanuelle	Italy
1977	Emanuelle Around the World	Laura Gemser	Joe D'Amato	Black Emanuelle	Italy
1977	Emanuelle and the Last Cannibals	Laura Gemser	Joe D'Amato	Black Emanuelle	Italy
1977	Sister Emanuelle	Laura Gemser	Giuseppe Vari	Black Emanuelle	Italy
1977	Goodbye Emmanuelle	Sylvia Kristel	François Leterrier	Emmanuelle	France
1977	Emmanuelle Tropical	Monique Lafond	J. Marreco		Brazil
1977	Porno Nights of the World (Emanuelle's Sexy Night Report)	Laura Gemser	Bruno Mattei	Black Emanuelle	Italy
1978	Emanuelle and the Porno Nights of the World	Laura Gemser	Bruno Mattei	Black Emanuelle	Italy
1978	Emanuelle and the White Slave Trade	Laura Gemser	Joe D'Amato	Black Emanuelle	Italy
1978	Emanuelle: A Woman from a Hot Country	Laura Gemser	José María Forqué		Spain
1978	Emmanuelle and Carol	Raquel Evans	Ignacio F. Iquino		Spain
1978	Carry On Emmannuelle	Suzanne Danielle	Gerald Thomas	Carry On	United Kingdom
1978	Emanuelle and Lolita	Nieves Navarro	Henri Sala		France
1978	High School Emanuelle: Wet Saturday	Minako Mizushima	Nobuyuki Saitō		Japan
1979	Emmanuelle from Kasımpaşa	Feri Cansel	Sirri Gültekin		Turkey
1980	Emanuelle: Queen of Sados	Laura Gemser	Elia Milonakos		Greece
1980	An Erotic Journal of a Lady from Thailand (Emmanuelle 3)	Brigitte Lahaie	Jean-Marie Pallardy		France
1980	The Daughter of Emmanuelle	Vanessa Alves	Oswaldo de Oliveira		Brazil
1980	Porno Esotic Love (Emmanuelle's Exotic Loves)	Laura Gemser	Joe D'Amato		Italy
1981	Divine Emanuelle	Laura Gemser	Christian Anders		Germany
1981	Emmanuelle in Soho	Angie Quick	David Hughes		United Kingdom
1981	In the Claws of the CIA (Kung Fu Emanuelle)	Raquel Evans	John Liu		Hong Kong
1982	The Inconfessable Orgies of Emmanuelle	Muriel Montossé	Jesús Franco		Spain
1982	Emanuelle in the Country	Laura Gemser	Mario Bianchi		Italy
1982	Emanuelle: Queen of the Desert	Laura Gemser	Bruno Fontana		Italy
1982	Violence in a Women's Prison (Emanuelle Reports from a Women's Prison)	Laura Gemser	Bruno Mattei	Black Emanuelle	Italy
1983	Women's Prison Massacre (Emanuelle Escapes from Hell)	Laura Gemser	Bruno Mattei	Black Emanuelle	Italy
1983	Emanuelle's Perverse Outburst	Laura Gemser	Joe D'Amato	Black Emanuelle	Italy
1984	Emmanuelle Goes to Cannes	Olinka Hardiman	Jean-Marie Pallardy		France
1984	Emmanuelle 4	Sylvia Kristel & Mia Nygren	Francis Leroi & Iris Letans	Emmanuelle	France
1986	Peep Show (Scandalous Emanuelle)	Laura Gemser	Joe D'Amato		Italy
1987	Emmanuelle 5	Monique Gabrielle	Walerian Borowczyk	Emmanuelle	France
1988	Emmanuelle 6	Natalie Uher	Bruno Zincone & Jean Rollin	Emmanuelle	France
1989	Lady Emmanuelle	Malù	Pasquale Fanetti		Italy
1993	Emmanuelle 7	Sylvia Kristel & Annie Bellac	Francis Leroi	Emmanuelle	France
1993	Emmanuelle Forever	Sylvia Kristel & Marcella Walerstein	Francis Leroi	Emmanuelle	France
1993	Emmanuelle's Revenge	Sylvia Kristel & Marcella Walerstein	Francis Leroi	Emmanuelle	France
1993	Emmanuelle in Venice	Sylvia Kristel & Marcella Walerstein	Francis Leroi	Emmanuelle	France
1993	Emmanuelle's Love	Sylvia Kristel & Marcella Walerstein	Francis Leroi	Emmanuelle	France
1993	Emmanuelle's Magic	Sylvia Kristel & Marcella Walerstein	Francis Leroi	Emmanuelle	France
1993	Emmanuelle's Perfume	Sylvia Kristel & Marcella Walerstein	Francis Leroi	Emmanuelle	France
1993	Emmanuelle's Secret	Sylvia Kristel & Marcella Walerstein	Francis Leroi	Emmanuelle	France
1994	Emmanuelle, Queen of the Galaxy (Emmanuelle: First Contact)	Krista Allen	Lev L. Spiro	Emmanuelle in Space	United States
1994	Emmanuelle 2: A World of Desire	Krista Allen	Jean-Jacques Lamore	Emmanuelle in Space	United States
1994	Emmanuelle 3: A Lesson in Love	Krista Allen	David Cove	Emmanuelle in Space	United States
1994	Emmanuelle 4: Concealed Fantasy	Krista Allen	Kevin Alber	Emmanuelle in Space	United States
1994	Emmanuelle 5: A Time to Dream	Krista Allen	David Cove	Emmanuelle in Space	United States
1994	Emmanuelle 6: One Final Fling	Krista Allen	Jean-Jacques Lamore	Emmanuelle in Space	United States
1994	Emmanuelle 7: The Meaning of Love	Krista Allen	Brody Hooper	Emmanuelle in Space	United States
2000	Emmanuelle 2000: Being Emmanuelle	Holly Sampson	Udo Blass	Emmanuelle 2000	United States
2000	Emmanuelle 2000: Emmanuelle in Paradise	Holly Sampson	Kevin Alber	Emmanuelle 2000	United States
2000	Emmanuelle 2000: Emmanuelle's Intimate Encounters	Holly Sampson	Rolfe Kanefsky	Emmanuelle 2000	United States
2000	Emmanuelle 2000: Jewel of Emmanuelle	Holly Sampson	Jill Hayworth	Emmanuelle 2000	United States
2000	Emmanuelle 2000: Emmanuelle and the Art of Love	Holly Sampson	Jill Hayworth	Emmanuelle 2000	United States
2000	Emmanuelle 2000: Emmanuelle's Sensual Pleasures	Holly Sampson	Fred Olen Ray	Emmanuelle 2000	United States
2000	Emmanuelle 2000: Emmanuelle Pie	Holly Sampson	Rolfe Kanefsky	Emmanuelle 2000	United States
2003	Emmanuelle in Rio	Ludmilla Ferraz	Kevin Alber		United States
2003	Emmanuelle in Hong Kong	Crystal Sun	Dick Lau		Hong Kong
2004	Emmanuelle Private Collection: Sex Goddess	Natasja Vermeer	Yamie Philippi	Emmanuelle Private Collection	United States
2004	Emmanuelle Private Collection: Emmanuelle vs Dracula	Natasja Vermeer	Keith Shaw	Emmanuelle Private Collection	United States
2004	Emmanuelle Private Collection: Sex Talk	Natasja Vermeer	Jean-Jacques Lamore	Emmanuelle Private Collection	United States
2004	Emmanuelle Private Collection: The Sex Lives of Ghosts	Natasja Vermeer	Maxamillion Eckes	Emmanuelle Private Collection	United States
2004	Emmanuelle Private Collection: Sexual Spells	Natasja Vermeer	Jean-Jacques Lamore	Emmanuelle Private Collection	United States
2004	Emmanuelle Private Collection: The Art of Ecstasy	Natasja Vermeer	Yamie Philippi	Emmanuelle Private Collection	United States
2004	Emmanuelle Private Collection: Jesse's Secret Desires	Natasja Vermeer	Jill Hayworth	Emmanuelle Private Collection	United States
2011	Emmanuelle Through Time: Emmanuelle's Skin City	Allie Haze	Rolfe Kanefsky	Emmanuelle Through Time	United States
2011	Emmanuelle Through Time: Emmanuelle's Sexy Bite	Allie Haze	Rolfe Kanefsky	Emmanuelle Through Time	United States
2011	Emmanuelle Through Time: Sex, Chocolate & Emmanuelle	Allie Haze	Rolfe Kanefsky	Emmanuelle Through Time	United States
2011	Emmanuelle Through Time: Rod Steele 0014 & Naked Agent 0069	Allie Haze	Rolfe Kanefsky	Emmanuelle Through Time	United States
2011	Emmanuelle Through Time: Sex Tales (Adventures Into the Woods: A Sexy Musical)	Allie Haze	Rolfe Kanefsky	Emmanuelle Through Time	United States
2011	Emmanuelle Through Time: Emmanuelle's Supernatural Sexual Activity	Allie Haze	Rolfe Kanefsky	Emmanuelle Through Time	United States
2011	Emmanuelle Through Time: Forbidden Pleasures	Allie Haze	Rolfe Kanefsky	Emmanuelle Through Time	United States
2022	The Awakening of Emanuelle	Nicole D'Angelo	Gregory Hatanaka		United States
2022	Call Me Emanuelle	Shoko Rice	Gregory Hatanaka		United States
2022	Do Ut Des (Emanuelle's Revenge)	Beatrice Schiaffino	Dario Germani		Italy
2023	Amor Emanuelle	Kali Kiyasumac	Gregory Hatanaka		United States
2023	Emanuelle in Sin City	Liz Clare	Jason Rudy		United States
2023	Amityville Emanuelle	Dawn Church	Louis DeStefano		United States
2024	Emmanuelle	Noémie Merlant	Audrey Diwan	Emmanuelle	France

== Video game ==
The character of Emmanuelle is also featured in a video game of the same name, released by Coktel Vision in 1989.

== In popular culture ==
- The American sketch comedy show Saturday Night Live aired a parody of the Emmanuelle films titled Danielle: A Free European Woman in their 01/19/2013 episode hosted by Jennifer Lawrence. The sketch featured Lawrence as the titular character, a free-spirited, sexually promiscuous, easily distracted French woman in a poorly dubbed to English film where she visits Italy with her lover, played by Fred Armisen.
- In the American television sitcom Seinfeld, the fictional movie "Rochelle, Rochelle", with the tagline "a young girl's strange, erotic journey from Milan to Minsk", is mentioned several times.
- In season 5, episode 4 of the American detective drama-comedy show Psych, Shawn Spencer references the franchise stating that he has seen them all, "even the one where she turns Black."
