= Emmanuelle (2024 film) =

2024 French erotic drama film

- Theatrical release poster
- Directed by: Audrey Diwan
- Screenplay by: Audrey Diwan; Rebecca Zlotowski
- Based on: Emmanuelle by Emmanuelle Arsan
- Produced by: Audrey Diwan
- Starring: Noémie Merlant; Will Sharpe; Jamie Campbell Bower; Chacha Huang; Anthony Wong; Naomi Watts
- Cinematography: Laurent Tangy
- Edited by: Pauline Gaillard
- Music by: Evgueni Galperine; Sacha Galperine
- Production companies: Rectangle Productions; Chantelouve; Goodfellas
- Distributed by: Pathé
- Release dates: 20 September 2024 (San Sebastián); 25 September 2024 (France)
- Running time: 105 minutes
- Country: France
- Language: English
- Budget: €18 million

Emmanuelle is a 2024 French erotic drama film directed, co-written and produced by Audrey Diwan. Based on the 1967 novel by Emmanuelle Arsan, it is the eighth theatrical film in the series of the same name, and the fifteenth film overall, and serves as a reboot. It stars Noémie Merlant as the title character, alongside Naomi Watts and Will Sharpe.

The film had its world premiere on 20 September 2024 at the 72nd San Sebastián International Film Festival, and was released in France by Pathé on 25 September 2024.

== Plot ==
Emmanuelle, a quality controller for a luxury hotel brand, arrives in Hong Kong to evaluate a hotel run by Margot, having been tasked with finding a good reason to sack her. Searching for a lost pleasure, she has numerous sensual experiences inside the hotel, and crosses path with Kei, a mysterious client with whom she becomes infatuated.

== Cast ==
- Noémie Merlant as Emmanuelle
- Naomi Watts as Margot
- Will Sharpe as Kei
- Jamie Campbell Bower as Sir John
- Chacha Huang as Zelda
- Anthony Wong as The Eye
- Carole Franck as Emmanuelle's Mother
- Adam Pak as Mr. Bao
- Isabella Wei as a concierge

== Production ==
In May 2022, it was announced Léa Seydoux had joined the cast of the film, with Audrey Diwan directing and producing from a screenplay she wrote with Rebecca Zlotowski, based upon the novel Emmanuelle by Emmanuelle Arsan. In February 2023, Noémie Merlant joined the cast of the film, replacing Seydoux. In December 2023, Naomi Watts, Will Sharpe, Jamie Campbell Bower, Chacha Huang and Anthony Wong joined the cast of the film.

Principal photography began in Paris in October 2023. Shooting also took place in Hong Kong, including at Chungking Mansions, the main setting for Wong Kar-wai's Chungking Express (1994), which Diwan chose for filming due to her deep appreciation for the film.

== Release ==
In November 2023, Neon was announced to be circling US distribution rights. The film had its world premiere at the 72nd San Sebastián International Film Festival on 20 September 2024. It was released theatrically in France by Pathé on 25 September 2024. Neon later transferred distribution rights to its division Decal, forgoing a theatrical release for a video on demand release on June 6, 2025.

== Reception ==
On the review aggregator website Rotten Tomatoes, 18% of 39 critics' reviews are positive, with an average rating of 4.8/10. The website's consensus reads: "Bitterly disappointing given the talent involved, this modern take on Emmanuelle is an erotic odyssey with no sizzle." Metacritic, which uses a weighted average, assigned the film a score of 35 out of 100, based on 10 critics, indicating "generally unfavorable" reviews.

== See also ==
- List of French films of 2024
