= Emmanuelle in Rio =

Emmanuelle in Rio is a 2003 made-for-television erotic film, directed by Kevin Alber and produced by Alain Siritzky from a script by Alber (as Ura Hee).

== Synopsis ==
Erotic adventuress Emmanuelle journeys to Brazil, where, as an internationally renowned fashion photographer, she continues her indiscriminate encounters with a number of denizens of "The Marvelous City".

== Cast ==
- Ludmilla Ferraz (credited as Ludmilla Lloyd) as Emmanuelle
- Hoyt Christopher as Harry
- Simone de Morais as Maria
