= Christina Rose =

American actress and producer

- Born: Christina Rose Polkowski; Naples, Italy
- Education: Central Michigan University (BFA)
- Occupations: Actress, voiceover artist, Singer

Christina Rose Polkowski is an American actress and producer best known to audiences for her work in Grease on Broadway, the award-winning movie musical How Do You Write a Joe Schermann Song, and as the voice of Celes Chere in World of Final Fantasy.

== Early life ==
Rose was born in Naples, Italy, the daughter of Mary and Allen Polkowski. She was raised in Macomb Twp., MI and performed in the family band, The Odyssey Sound System, for many years prior to graduating from Central Michigan University with her BFA in Musical Theatre Performance.

=== Career ===
Rose started performing at a very young age making her professional dance debut as an acrobat in The Nutcracker Ballet at the Fox Theatre in Detroit, Michigan. Soon to follow were numerous starring roles in various theatre productions. Once graduating from Central Michigan University she immediately joined the cast of the First National Tour of Oklahoma! in 2004. Rose moved to New York City immediately following her run with the tour. She signed a contract with Walt Disney World in Orlando, Florida, where she joined the original cast of Finding Nemo – The Musical. Rose left the show to make her Broadway Debut in Grease at the Brooks Atkinson Theatre in New York City. During Rose's run with Grease, she was able to shoot various commercials during the day.

== Filmography ==
As actress
Year	Title	Role	Notes
2009	All My Children	Samantha	Television series
2009	30 Rock	All American Girl	Television series
2010	Death of the Dead	Wanda	Feature film
2012	How Do You Write a Joe Schermann Song	Evey Lorraine	Feature film
2015	Broken: A Musical	Mona	Feature film
2015	The Evolution of a Gen-X Music Purchaser	Jade O'Brien	Short film
2016	Unjust Justice: The Jimmy Rosemond Tapes	Narrator (voice)	Documentary series
2016	World of Final Fantasy	Celes Chere (voice)	Video game
2017	Compatibility	Jade O'Brien	Short film
2018	Eleven Eleven	Mallory Faris	Feature film
2018	Fallout 76	Amy Kerry / Additional Voices (voice)	Video game

== Theatre ==
Broadway
Year	Title	Theatre	Role	Notes
2007	Grease	Brooks Atkinson Theatre	HandJive Specialty Dancer, U/S Sandy Dumbroski, Marty, Patty	Original 2007 Broadway Revival cast - replacement

Other Theatre Credits
Year	Title	Theatre	Role	Notes
2014	Finding Nemo – The Musical	Walt Disney World	Squirt, Pearl	Original cast

== Discography ==
Cast Recordings
Year	Title	Music & Lyrics	Role
2012	How Do You Write a Joe Schermann Song	Joe Schermann	Evey
2015	Broken	Monica Rose Martino	Mona
