= Le Périer =

- Part of Chantepérier
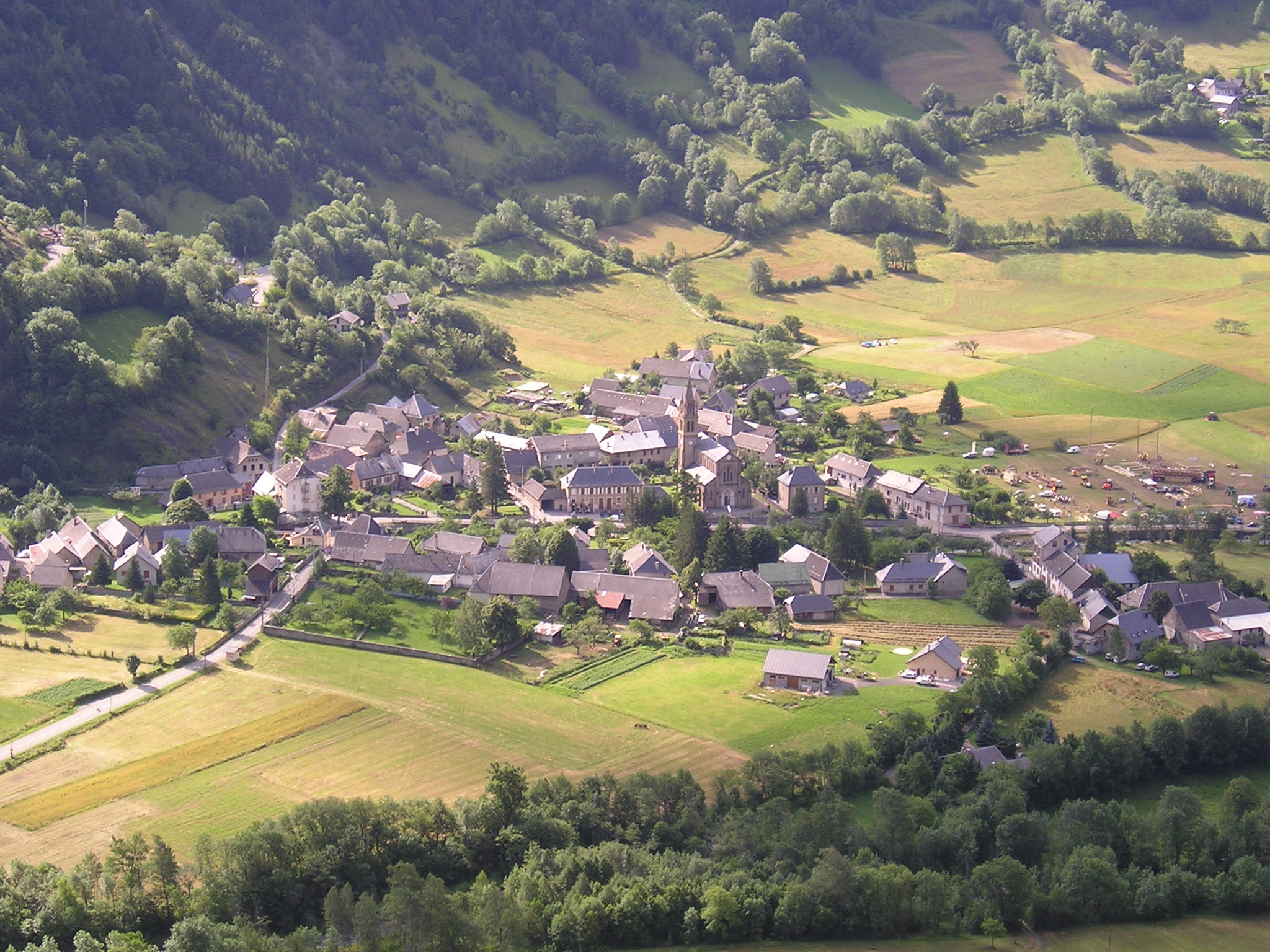
- A general view of Le Périer
- Location of Le Périer
- Location within France Location within Auvergne-Rhône-Alpes
- Coordinates: 44°56′16″N 5°58′27″E
- Country: France
- Region: Auvergne-Rhône-Alpes
- Department: Isère
- Arrondissement: Grenoble
- Canton: Matheysine-Trièves
- Commune: Chantepérier
- Area^{1}: 47.99 km^{2} (18.53 sq mi)
- Elevation: 897 m (2,943 ft)
- Highest elevation: 2,992 m (9,816 ft)
- Lowest elevation: 815 m (2,674 ft)
- Population (2023): 144
  - Density: 3.00/km^{2} (7.77/sq mi)
- Time zone: UTC+01:00 (CET)
  - Summer (DST): UTC+02:00 (CEST)
- Postal code: 38740
- ^{1} French Land Register data, which excludes lakes, ponds, glaciers > 1 km^{2} (0.386 sq mi or 247 acres) and river estuaries.

Le Périer (French pronunciation: [lə peʁje]) is a former commune in the Isère department in southeastern France. On 1 January 2019, it was merged into the new commune Chantepérier.

== See also ==
- Communes of the Isère department
