= Meet Market (film) =

- Film poster
- Directed by: Charlie Loventhal
- Written by: Charlie Loventhal
- Produced by: Pam Auer; Scott Valentine
- Starring: Krista Allen; Elizabeth Berkley; Susan Egan; Julian McMahon; Missi Pyle; Alan Tudyk; Aisha Tyler
- Cinematography: Steven Fierberg
- Edited by: Greg D'Auria
- Music by: David Robbins
- Distributed by: Seedsman Group
- Release date: January 29, 2004
- Running time: 78 minutes
- Country: United States
- Language: English

Meet Market is a 2004 film directed by Charlie Loventhal and starring Alan Tudyk, Krista Allen, Elizabeth Berkley, Laurie Holden and Julian McMahon. The movie is a comedy about singles in Los Angeles who attempt to find love in the aisles of a supermarket. The film was released directly to DVD on February 12, 2008. The title is a play on the vulgar slang of "meat market" which refers to bars and clubs where singles go to find a partner for one-night stands with zero emotional attachment.

== Cast ==
- Krista Allen as Lucinda
- Elizabeth Berkley as Linda
- Susan Egan as Tess
- Suzanne Krull as Lima Lips
- Julian McMahon as Hutch
- Missi Pyle as Ericka
- Jennifer Sky as Courtney
- Alan Tudyk as Danny
- Aisha Tyler as Jane
- Robert Trebor as Director Dick
- Jack Kenny as Manager Dick
- Christine Estabrook as Mom
- Laurie Holden as Billy
