= Growing Up Supermodel =

- Genre: Reality television
- Starring: Kelly Le Brock; Arissa Le Brock; Andrea Shroder; Cambrie Shroder; Faith Shroder; Beverly Peele; Cairo Peele; Shanna Moakler; Atiana De La Hoya; Krista Allen; Jake Morritt; J.D. Ostojic; Janis Ostojic
- Country of origin: United States
- Original language: English
- No. of seasons: 1
- No. of episodes: 9

Production
- Executive producers: Alex Baskin; James Davis; Douglas Ross; Mary Donahue; Liz Gateley; Mariana Flynn; John Carr; Brian McCarthy
- Running time: 42 to 44 minutes

Original release
- Network: Lifetime
- Release: August 16 – September 20, 2017

Growing Up Supermodel is a docuseries on Lifetime. The series premiered on August 16, 2017, and follows the nascent careers of daughters and sons of famous models or actors. The premise of the show was greenlit because many of the current top models of the fashion industry are children of famous people with large social media followings.

== Cast ==
- Kelly Le Brock – American-British fashion model and actress
- Arissa Le Brock – Plus size model and daughter of Kelly and American actor Steven Seagal
- Andrea Schroder – Ex-wife of American actor Ricky Schroder.
- Cambrie Schroder – Model and oldest daughter of Andrea and Ricky Schroder
- Faith Schroder – Model and younger daughter of Andrea and Ricky Schroder
- Beverly Peele – American fashion model
- Cairo Peele – Model and daughter of Beverly Peele
- Shanna Moakler – American model, Miss USA 1995, Playboy Playmate, actress, and reality television personality
- Atiana De La Hoya – Model and daughter of Shanna Moakler and American former boxer Oscar De La Hoya. Former stepdaughter of American rock musician Travis Barker.
- Krista Allen – American actress
- Jake Morritt – American male model, actor and son of Krista Allen
- J.D. Ostojic – Belgian male model
- Janis Ostojic – Belgian male model and son of J.D. Ostojic

== Episodes ==
No.	Title	Original release date	U.S. viewers (millions)
1	"The New Wave"	August 16, 2017	N/A
The model progeny meet and befriend each other at a Los Angeles photoshoot. Cambrie Schroder moves out of her parents' house which emotionally affects her mother, Andrea, reeling from her divorce from Ricky Schroder.
2	"Daddy Issues"	August 23, 2017	N/A
Atiana De La Hoya invites the group (excluding Arissa Le Brock) to a photoshoot but Cambrie deems it unprofessional. Beverly Peele is due to give birth to her next daughter, but Cairo is resentful.
3	"The Hookup Culture"	August 30, 2017	N/A
Atiana admits she prefers casual hook-ups, which doesn't sit well with Andrea, who believes Atiana is a bad influence. Faith and Cambrie argue with their mom about slut shaming. J.D. and Janis finally get approved to come to America but encounter visa problems at the last minute. Kelly doesn't appreciate Arissa's candor about their family relationships.
4	"Mama Bears"	September 6, 2017	N/A
Cairo reaches out to her father. Shanna confronts Andrea about her comments on Atiana's love life. Faith gets a part time job.
5	"Strike Two"	September 13, 2017	N/A
Krista encourages Andrea to put her foot down with Faith and Cambrie, but the girls feel she's only been becoming more strict since their father is no longer in the household to do that. J. D. teaches the kids how to runway walk but Atiana is struggling.
6	"Striking Out"	September 20, 2017	N/A
Andrea brings in help to try to make peace with Cambrie and Faith, but a visitor throws her over the emotional edge. Cairo lashes out at her friends after suffering a major setback in her modeling career, and JD gets put in his place by all the single mothers when he keeps trying to fix their problems.
7	"Super Insulting"	September 20, 2017	N/A
Cambrie offends Shanna by refusing to participate in her photo shoot, and Andrea makes matters far worse when she comes to her daughter's defense. Atiana plans a blowout party for her 18th birthday, but risks heartbreak when she pins all her hopes on the attendance of her father, famous boxer Oscar De La Hoya.
8	"The Double Standard"	September 20, 2017	N/A
Beverly organizes a major industry meet-and-greet for all the kids, but Shanna and Atiana risk insulting her when they refuse to play by the rules. After Andrea's apology fails to impress, she calls out the group for their hypocrisy. Arissa earns the admiration of her mother Kelly when she finds herself on a winning streak in her modeling career.
9	"The Final Straw"	September 20, 2017	N/A
Tensions boil over when Kelly invites everyone to a sleepover at her Santa Ynez ranch. Andrea, Cambrie and Faith find themselves under attack for being entitled and standoffish, but they’ve finally had enough and decide to fight back. Krista wants to make peace with all the women, but her unconventional techniques only leave them worse off. Atiana finally gets to meet with her father, and Arissa inspires her mother with the success she's starting to attain.
