= Emmanuelle, Queen of the Galaxy =

- DVD cover
- Genre: Softcore Pornography
- Written by: Daryl Haney, Noel Harrison
- Directed by: Lev L. Spiro
- Starring: Krista Allen; Paul Michael Robinson; Tiendra Demian
- Country of origin: United States
- Original language: English

Production
- Producer: Alain Siritzky
- Running time: 93 minutes

Original release
- Release: 1994

Emmanuelle, Queen of the Galaxy (also known in some releases as Emmanuelle: First Contact) is a 1994 television film, which was the first episode from the erotic series Emmanuelle in Space, also giving its name to the theme song for the series. It was directed by Lev L. Spiro, produced by Alain Siritzky, and written by Daryl Haney and Noel Harrison.

== Cast ==
- Krista Allen as Emmanuelle
- Paul Michael Robinson as Captain Haffron Williams
- Tiendra Demian as Tasha
- Reginald Chevalier as Raymond
- Hu Beaumont as Alain
- Bill Rojas as Agent 2
- Brett Wagner as Agent 3
- Neil Delama as Aleksandru
- Robert Drake as John
- Carl Ferro as Martin
- Jonathon Breck as Cop
- Timothy Di Pri as Theo
- Sun Yung Gai as Monk 1
- Rick Mali as Monk 2
- Kent James as Jeremy
- John Huey as The Bartender
- Bill Klein as Jimmy
- Derek Krueger as Derek
- Claude Knowlton as Leonardo
- Derek Layne as Henry
- Jack Lawson as Philip
- Kirt Lesow as Gentleman
- Mark Scavetta as Max
- P.S. Sono as The Abbot
- John Wongstein as Dharka
- Kimberly Rowe as Angie
- M. Nune as Michael
- Brad Nick'ell as Pierre
- Jesus Nebot as Don Remeo
- Robert Nassry as Dimitri
- Andrew Lim as Trungpa
- Steve Michaels as Dirk
- David Madell as John
- Debra K. Beatty
- Chanda
- Angela Cornell 1
