= Emmanuelle (novel) =

1967 novel by Emmanuelle Arsan

- Author: Emmanuelle Arsan
- Translator: Lowell Bair
- Language: French
- Genre: Erotica
- Publisher: Grove Press
- Publication date: 1967
- Publication place: France
- Media type: Print
- Pages: 224
- ISBN: 978-0-8021-0053-5
- Followed by: Emmanuelle L'Anti-vierge

Emmanuelle (Emmanuelle: The Joys of a Woman) is an erotic novel by Emmanuelle Arsan originally written in French and published in France in 1967. It was translated into and published in English in 1971 by Mayflower Books. It is a series of explicit erotic fantasies of the author in which she has sex with several—often anonymous—men and women, as well as her husband. It is written in the first person and the reader sees events entirely through the eyes of the sexually adventurous heroine. The book sold widely and later went on to be adapted into a film. The book had two print sequels, and the film launched an extended series.

== Plot summary ==
Emmanuelle, the 19-year-old wife of a French engineer, is flying out to join her husband in Bangkok. While on the plane, she has anonymous sexual encounters with two men, the first time she has cheated on her husband since they were married.

She arrives in Bangkok and becomes part of a hedonistic community of western expats. She makes two new friends – Ariane de Saynes, a 30-year-old French countess, and Marie-Anne, a younger girl. Both friendships have a strong homoerotic flavor. Emmanuelle and Marie-Anne begin a series of sexual games in which they take turns masturbating while the other watches. Meanwhile, Ariane makes a series of attempts to seduce Emmanuelle, culminating in a sexual encounter between the two women on a squash court which verges on rape. Afterwards Ariane tries to persuade Emmanuelle to return home with her. Emmanuelle rejects her advances, but immediately regrets doing so.

At a tea party hosted by Marie-Anne's mother, Emmanuelle meets Bee, the sister of a naval attaché at the American Embassy. Emmanuelle is immediately attracted to the slender, red-headed Bee, and when the two women meet later by chance on the streets of Bangkok she takes the opportunity to invite Bee home with her. Emmanuelle seduces her and the two women make love, first in the shower and then in Emmanuelle's bed. Afterwards Emmanuelle professes her love for Bee, who is taken aback, having never been with another woman before. They agree to meet again, but Bee does not come and Emmanuelle realizes she has no way of contacting her. She is heartbroken and is comforted by her husband.

Marie-Anne, meanwhile, believes that Emmanuelle needs to be cured of her need to associate sex with love. She offers to introduce Emmanuelle to a friend, Mario, an Italian nobleman, who can do this. The two meet for the first time at an embassy cocktail party and Emmanuelle agrees to join him for dinner the following night. Emmanuelle thinks that Mario will become her lover, but Ariane dismisses this idea, telling Emmanuelle that Mario is gay.

The following evening, Emmanuelle and Mario have dinner at Mario's house, joined by an Englishman called Quentin. Over dinner, Mario expounds his philosophy of eroticism, which is that true freedom comes only when eroticism is divorced from love. He offers to take Emmanuelle on a trip that will demonstrate this. The three plunge into the back streets of Bangkok. They visit an opium den and then a temple, where Emmanuelle makes two votive offerings, first by masturbating Mario and then by performing oral sex on a boy. Later, having parted company with Quentin, the two return to Mario's house in a rickshaw pulled by a Thai driver (or sam-lo). During the ride, Emmanuelle demonstrates her new-found freedom by removing her top and then fellating Mario in public. They arrive back at Mario's house and he tells her that he is going to take her "through" the body of the sam-lo. The three make love, the sam-lo penetrating Emmanuelle while Mario penetrates him. As the three reach orgasm together, Emmanuelle screams out, "I'm in love! I'm in love!"

== Themes ==
=== East vs West ===
Bangkok is portrayed as a hedonistic city which has a sybaritic effect on its western expat population. Emmanuelle has erotic encounters in settings that represent stereotypes for the exoticism of the East (a massage parlor, opium den, and temple).

=== Love vs lust ===
The underlying theme of the novel is the conflict between Emmanuelle's need for love (as typified by her relationships with Jean and Bee) and her innate eroticism (as shown by her anonymous sexual encounters on the plane and her games with Marie-Anne). Mario seeks to address this philosophically in Chapter V of the novel ("The Law"), arguing that surrendering to eroticism will liberate her. The last chapter of the story shows the beginning of this process, which is continued in the 1976 sequel to the novel.

=== Bisexuality ===
Three of the major characters in the novel – Emmanuelle, Ariane, and Mario – are bisexual in orientation. Although married and despite having sexual encounters with two other men, Emmanuelle describes herself to Mario as a lesbian. She has a passionate sexual relationship with one woman (Bee), sexual encounters with two more (Ariane and Marie-Anne), and expresses attraction to various others (e.g. a flight attendant). It is also hinted that she has had sexual relationships with women prior to arriving in Thailand. Mario is described by Ariane as being gay. He is primarily attracted to men and has sex with the sam-lo, but also allows himself to be fellated and masturbated by Emmanuelle. Ariane is married and has had numerous male lovers, but is strongly attracted to Emmanuelle and makes several attempts to seduce her, including one quasi-rape.

== History ==
Although the formal date of publication is usually given as 1967, the novel was actually first published and distributed clandestinely in France, without an author's name, in 1959. Successive editions later bore the nom-de-plume Emmanuelle Arsan, who was subsequently revealed to be Marayat Rollet-Andriane. Though the novel was sometimes hinted to be a quasi-autobiography, it was later claimed that the actual author was her husband Louis-Jacques Rollet-Andriane.

== Adaptations ==
The best known adaptation of Emmanuelle is the 1974 film of the same name, directed by Just Jaeckin, and starring Sylvia Kristel. The screenplay was written by Jean-Louis Richard and more-or-less follows the plot of the novel. The film was highly successful in France and around the world. It spawned several sequels and influenced many theatrical and television films.

In 1978, Italian artist Guido Crepax produced a graphic adaptation of the novel which faithfully mirrors the plot of the original.

Audrey Diwan adapted the story in 2024's Emmanuelle.

== See also ==
- Emmanuelle
