= Beverly Peele =

American model and actress (born 1975)

- Born: March 18, 1975 (age 51); Los Angeles, California, U.S.
- Occupations: Model; actress
- Years active: 1987–present
- Children: 4
- Modeling information
- Height: 1.8 m (5 ft 11 in)
- Hair color: Dark brown
- Eye color: Brown

Beverly Peele (born March 18, 1975) is an American supermodel and actress. Peele rose to fame in the late 1980s and 1990s, and appeared on over 250 fashion magazine covers.

== Career ==
Peele was born in Los Angeles, California and began modeling in 1987 at age 12. She attended Hawthorne High School in Hawthorne, California from 1989-1991. In 1989, she landed her first magazine cover, on Mademoiselle, becoming the first non-white model to appear on that magazine's cover.

During her modeling career, she was featured in ads for the likes of Ralph Lauren, Donna Karan and Versace. Peele has appeared on magazine covers worldwide including Vogue, Mademoiselle, Elle, and Cosmopolitan. She also did runway work for, among others, Chanel, Balenciaga, Todd Oldham, Calvin Klein, Oscar de la Renta, Perry Ellis and Comme des Garçons. While still a teen-ager, she famously closed Versace fashion shows.

Peele appeared in Heavy D & the Boyz's music video for "Nuttin' but Love," Jodeci's 1995 video "Freakin You", and George Michael's Thierry Mugler-styled "Too Funky" video alongside Nadja Auermann, Tyra Banks, Linda Evangelista, Estelle Hallyday, and Rossy de Palma. In 1997, she began acting and appeared in Sister, Sister [Season 5, Episode 1: Designer Genes] and Girlfriends. Peele also had a role in the 2002 film Sweet Friggin' Daisies with Zooey Deschanel.

== Personal life ==
In 1994, Peele had a daughter named Cairo with her then-husband Jeffrey Alexander. She had a son Trey in 2004, a son DJ in 2011, and a daughter Storm in 2017. Cairo, DJ, and Storm appeared with Peele on the Lifetime docuseries Growing Up Supermodel.

In 2021, Peele alleged that Peter Nygård was the father of Trey, who she said was conceived after Nygård sexually assaulted her. An attorney for Nygård denied the allegation. When Nygård was jailed after multiple women accused him of sexual assault, Peele went public with problems arising from the fact that his child support payments had stopped.
