= Capital Arts Entertainment =

American entertainment company

- Industry: Entertainment and films; Film production and film distribution; Financing
- Genre: Feature films
- Founded: 1995
- Founder: Michael Elliot; Robert Kerchner; Joseph Genier
- Headquarters: Los Angeles, California, United States
- Key people: Roger Corman (CEO)
- Owner: Roger Corman
- Divisions: Push Worldwide

Capital Arts Entertainment is a Los Angeles-based film and television production, financing and distribution company.

Run by former Roger Corman alums Mike Elliott, Rob Kerchner and Joe Genier, Capital Arts Entertainment is widely believed to have produced, with Saban Entertainment's Lance H.Robbins and Haim Saban, the very first direct-to-video sequel, 1997's Casper: A Spirited Beginning starring Steve Guttenberg, Lori Loughlin and Rodney Dangerfield.

Company efforts include Tyler Perry's Diary of a Mad Black Woman, American Pie Presents: The Book of Love, Beethoven's 5th, Peaceful Warrior, Why Did I Get Married?, Route 9, The Perfect Holiday and TimeCop : The Berlin Decision. Though best known for their succession of direct-to-video sequels, the shingle has also developed and produced several original features.

== History ==
Capital Arts Entertainment was founded in 1995 by Mike Elliot, Rob Kerchner and Joe Genier.

The company's first major effort, Casper: A Spirited Beginning (1997) won VSDA's direct-to-video release by a major studio in 1998. The company later developed and produced many more sequels for the home entertainment market, working with most of the major studios. Among the direct-to-video sequels produced by the shingle, American Pie Presents: The Book of Love, American Pie Presents: The Naked Mile, and The Prince and Me 2: The Royal Wedding.

"We gained a reputation back in the 90′s for doing tightly-budgeted, high profile sequels, starting with Fox and Warner Bros (like Casper, Casper Meets Wendy, Addams Family Reunion, Richie Rich)", Elliot said in 2006. "The market was new, then, but growing. We helped it grow. Soon, word spread and we started doing sequels for many of the studios in town. It seems that there are only a handful of producers who can work within the tight budget parameters and high standards that this business demands."

In 2005, Capital Arts Entertainment announced the launch of an international distribution company, Push Worldwide.

Capital Arts Entertainment produced Beethoven's Big Break and Blue Crush 2, both of which Elliot also directed, Smokin' Aces 2: Assassins' Ball, American Pie Presents: The Book of Love, the VH1 telemovie Wifey and Death Race : Inferno. The company also provided production services on MTV's Teen Wolf TV series, which premiered on the network in 2011.

== Direct-to-video sequel pioneers ==
Capital Arts Entertainment claim Casper: A Spirited Beginning is the first direct-to-video sequel ever produced. Debuting on home video September 9, 1997, the film is directed by Sean McNamara and takes place before the events of 1995's Casper, telling of how the titular character became the friendly sprite.

“I claim I made the first DTV sequel (with Casper: A Spirited Beginning [1997]),” Elliot said. “Stephen Einhorn’ll tell you he did with Poison Ivy 2 (1996), but I’m pretty sure they thought they were making a theatrical while they were doing it. I suspect Stephen thought it was a theatrical, too.”

== Achievements ==
Capital Arts Entertainment produced Casper: A Spirited Beginning (1997), distributed by Twentieth Century Fox Home Video, which was voted the best direct-to-video release by a major by VSDA in 1998. It sold 5.5 million units, according to Hosea Belcher, vice president of marketing at Twentieth Century Fox Home Entertainment. American Pie Presents : Band Camp (2005), produced by the company and released by Universal Home Entertainment, is one of the top 5 non-family direct-to-video titles of all time. The Prince and Me 2: The Royal Wedding (2006) was voted family title of the year and rental title of the year at VSDA.

== Push Distribution ==
In 2005, Capital Arts Entertainment begun acquiring and distributing completed motion pictures under their Push Distribution label. Aiming to buy and distribute 10-15 completed films a year, Push was formed so independent filmmakers would have more opportunities to showcase their work.

"As filmmakers ourselves, we recognized the need for a new type of international distribution company — a filmmaker's distributor," Mike Elliot said. "Push is committed to the dual creative process of identifying innovative and accessible films and providing these filmmakers with the entry point to the global audience. Our objective is to be the filmmaker's partner as we push them together with buyers who understand quality and marketability and value the consistent flow of product from Push Worldwide."

Push Distribution have acquired and distributed such feature films as Razortooth, One Way to Valhalla, The Independent, Eating Raoul, Land Gold Women, Outside Sales and Almost Related.
