= Chantepérier =

- Commune
- Location of Chantepérier
- Location within France Location within Auvergne-Rhône-Alpes
- Coordinates: 44°59′05″N 5°58′09″E
- Country: France
- Region: Auvergne-Rhône-Alpes
- Department: Isère
- Arrondissement: Grenoble
- Canton: Matheysine-Trièves
- Intercommunality: Matheysine

Government
  - Mayor (2020–2026): Christelle Meheut
- Area^{1}: 81.40 km^{2} (31.43 sq mi)
- Highest elevation: 3,023 m (9,918 ft)
- Lowest elevation: 897 m (2,943 ft)
- Population (2023): 213
  - Density: 2.62/km^{2} (6.78/sq mi)
- Time zone: UTC+01:00 (CET)
  - Summer (DST): UTC+02:00 (CEST)
- INSEE/Postal code: 38073 /38740
- ^{1} French Land Register data, which excludes lakes, ponds, glaciers > 1 km^{2} (0.386 sq mi or 247 acres) and river estuaries.

Chantepérier (French pronunciation: [ʃɑ̃tpeʁje]) is a commune in the Isère department in southeastern France. It was established on 1 January 2019 by merger of the former communes of Chantelouve (the seat) and Le Périer.

== See also ==
- Communes of the Isère department
