= Suzanne Krull =

American actress (1966–2013)

- Born: July 8, 1966; New York City, U.S.
- Died: July 27, 2013 (aged 47); Los Angeles, California
- Other name: Suzanne Krull Spruyt
- Education: South Shore High School; Agoura High School
- Alma mater: American Academy of Dramatic Arts
- Occupation: Actress
- Years active: 1988–2013
- Spouse: Peter Spruyt (m. 2006–2013)
- Children: 1

Suzanne Krull (July 8, 1966 – July 27, 2013) was an American actress.

== Early years ==
Born in New York City, Krull attended South Shore High School in Brooklyn, New York, and Agoura High School in Agoura, California. She was a graduate of the American Academy of Dramatic Arts in New York City.

== Death ==
Krull died on July 27, 2013, of a ruptured aortic aneurysm. She was interred at Mount Sinai Memorial Park Cemetery in Los Angeles on July 30, 2013.

== Filmography ==
=== Film ===
Film	Role	Year	Notes
Open Season	Mona	1995	
The Tie That Binds	The Fox	1995	
8 Heads in a Duffel Bag	Woman Waiting at Phone	1997	
Trial and Error	Macrobiatic Customer (uncredited)	1997	
MouseHunt	Waitress #1	1997	
The Souler Opposite	Vanessa	1998	
Go	Stringy Haired Woman	1999	
The Next Best Thing	Annabel	2000	
Dr. Seuss' How the Grinch Stole Christmas	Shopper	2000	
Camouflage	Skinny Woman	2001	
Jackpot	Sneezy Waitress	2001	
Kids in America	Reporter #3	2005	
Meet Market	Lima Lips	2008	
Race to Witch Mountain	Gail Ross	2009	
The Wrong Woman	Marla	2013	
Rudderless	Bertie Dupree	2014	Posthumous appearance; Final role

=== Television ===
Title	Role	Year
The Facts of Life	Melissa	1988
NYPD Blue	Trish McFarland/Junie	1994–1998
General Hospital	Suzanne / Gretchen	1994–2008
Sisters	Wife	1996
Night Stand with Dick Dietrick	Heidi	1997
Guns	Wife	1997
Nash Bridges	Betty Ann McCurry / Betty Ann / Lucy	1997–2001
Seinfeld	Unattractive Gwen	1997
Mike Hammer, Private Eye	Chloe	1998
The Simple Life	A.D.	1998
Arliss	Nurse	1998
Sabrina The Teenage Witch	Olga	1998
Buffy the Vampire Slayer	Clerk	1998
Martial Law	Mrs. Pimner	1998–1999
Two Guys and a Girl	Bates Balou	1999
The Practice	Louise Farcher	2002
Judging Amy	Lucinda Roane	2003
Phil of the Future	Miss Winston	2004–2005
Strong Medicine	Aileen	2005
That's So Raven	Judge	2005
Charmed	Imara	2005
Zoey 101	Miss Bervich	2005–2008
ER	Mary Grant	2007
Lost	Lynn Karnoff	2007–2010
Nip/Tuck	Counter Lady	2009
Desperate Housewives	Sophie	2009
In Security	Ms. Loren	2010
Wright vs. Wrong	Donna	2010
Perfect Couples	Dr. Dahlquist	2010
Mr. Sunshine	Mindy	2011
Good Luck Charlie	Joyce	2011
Parenthood	Sharon	2011
Prime Suspect	Sheila	2011
Psych	Dot	2011
Glee	Eccentric Vogue Woman	2012
Criminal Minds	Dr. Sarah Glenn	2012
Jessie	Mildred Lumpky	2012–2013

=== Shorts ===
Title	Role	Year
Por vida	Julie	1996
Stripping for Jesus	Polly	1998
Sam and Mike	Sam	1999
