= Eleven Eleven (2018 film) =

2018 American comedy film

- Film poster
- Directed by: Chris Redish
- Written by: Chris Redish
- Produced by: Joe Gruberman
- Starring: Krista Allen; Charles Baker; Christina Rose; Jennifer Pfalzgraff
- Cinematography: Webb Pickersgill
- Release dates: May 2018 (Hollywood Boulevard); January 28, 2020 (Gravitas Ventures)
- Country: United States
- Language: English

Eleven Eleven is a 2018 American comedy film produced by Joe Gruberman, and written and directed by Chris Redish. Doc Wyatt served as Consulting Producer to providing guidance for this, Redish's first feature-length project.

The film stars Charles Baker in the lead role of Tim Faris, a UFO enthusiast who yearns to be abducted by aliens, even at the risk of the happiness of his family life.

Eleven Eleven premiered at the 2018 Hollywood Boulevard Film Festival, where it won Best Comedy Feature, Best Director, Best Actor and Best Actress.

== Plot ==
Tim Faris (Charles Baker) is a middle-aged father who lives with a secret. A past sexual encounter with a beautiful alien named Andromeda (Krista Allen) leaves Tim yearning for the opportunity to explore the Solar System in an alien spacecraft. In Tim's mind, the only way to do this is to be abducted by aliens. Tim joins a support group called Abductees Anonymous in the hope of finding like-minded individuals, only to find himself surrounded by prior abductees in trauma. Tim's life quickly turns upside down when, after 15 years, Andromeda returns to Earth for a visit. Unbeknownst to Tim, Andromeda's trip includes a secret agenda.

== Cast ==
- Charles Baker as Tim
- Krista Allen as Andromeda
- Christina Rose as Mallory
- Jennifer Pfalzgraff as Eve
- Dominic Bogart as Clint

== Production ==
Redish shot the film on location in Gilbert and Sedona, Arizona, in December 2013. He used an Arizona-based crew and nearly all of the actors were based in Arizona, with the exception of some key talent: Baker, Allen, Rose and Bogart.

Eleven Eleven was Redish's debut feature film, and Baker's first leading role. In addition to acquiring Charles Baker, the production also acquired Baywatch: Hawaii star Krista Allen.

The film takes place in and around the home of the fictitious Tim and Eve Faris. The majority of interiors were shot in a rented house in Gilbert, AZ. The production moved to Sedona to shoot all of the exteriors. Interior and exterior shots were then stitched together by strategic camera movement, cutaways, or green screen special effects in exterior doorways.

Post-production challenges, including critical visual effects, prevented the movie from being completed until 2018. In 2020, the film was released to non-theatrical distribution by Gravitas Ventures.

== Awards ==
- Four awards at the 2018 Hollywood Boulevard Film Festival: Best Actor (Charles Baker), Best Actress (Krista Allen), Best Director (Chris Redish), Best Comedy Feature.
- Winner of Award of Merit Special Mention for Leading Actress (Krista Allen) at 2018 IndieFEST.
- Winner of Best Director Award (Chris Redish) at the 2018 Portland Comedy Festival.
- Winner for Best First Time Filmmaker (Chris Redish) at the October 2018 Aphrodite Film Awards.
- Winner for Best Visual Effects at the 2018 Silver State Film Festival.
