= Jesse Stone: No Remorse =

- DVD cover
- Genre: Crime film
- Based on: the Jesse Stone novels by Robert B. Parker
- Screenplay by: Tom Selleck; Michael Brandman
- Directed by: Robert Harmon
- Starring: Tom Selleck; Kathy Baker; Kohl Sudduth
- Music by: Jeff Beal
- Country of origin: United States
- Original language: English

Production
- Producer: Steven J. Brandman
- Cinematography: David Gribble
- Editor: Steven Cohen
- Running time: 87 minutes
- Production companies: Brandman Productions; Sony Pictures Television

Original release
- Network: CBS
- Release: May 9, 2010

Jesse Stone: No Remorse is a 2010 American made-for-television crime drama film directed by Robert Harmon and starring Tom Selleck, Kathy Baker, and Kohl Sudduth. Written by Tom Selleck and Michael Brandman, it is based on the Jesse Stone novels written by Robert B. Parker. This film is about the police chief of a small New England town who investigates a series of murders in Boston for a state police colleague and uncovers evidence that leads to a notorious mob boss. Filmed on location in Nova Scotia, the story is set in the fictitious town of Paradise, Massachusetts.

Jesse Stone: No Remorse is the sixth in a series of nine television films adapted from Parker's Jesse Stone novels. With David Gribble as cinematographer, the film was nominated for an American Society of Cinematographers Award for Achievement in Cinematography, Motion Picture/Miniseries Television. The film first aired on the CBS television network on May 9, 2010.

== Plot ==
=== Main plot ===
The film begins with the shooting murder of a young man at night as he opens his car door in a parking garage. Jesse Stone, following his suspension as chief of police, has sunk into seclusion and alcoholism. Ordered not to communicate with his former subordinates while on suspension, he has been out of touch with everyone. Eventually his colleague Rose, an officer, becomes concerned and asks Stone's friend Captain Healy, the State Police Homicide Commander, to check in on him. Healy is recovering from gunshot wounds and supposed to be on medical leave but, as he tells Stone, he's taking his leave at his office. Healy finds Stone disheveled, drunk, and despondent. Shortly after Healy arrives, Stone receives a phone call from his ex-wife Jenn, so Healy leaves. Jenn tells Jesse that she needs to talk because she and Elliot had a fight. Angered, Jesse tells Jenn that they shouldn't speak anymore, and rips out the phone. Later he buys a cell phone, which Rose helps him program. He gives the number only to her and a few others. Jesse and Rose are becoming close.

After a second murder in a parking garage, Healy asks Jesse to work as a private consultant to the Boston police department on the investigation. He does this partly to help his friend, but he also needs Stone's experience. Jesse soon learns that the first victim had ties to Boston mob boss Gino Fish. When Stone questions Fish about the man, he denies knowing him, as does his secretary Alan. After a third murder, Jesse questions Fish again, who admits that he knew the first victim, but that he hadn't seen him for a couple of days before the murder. Alan confirms this. Later Stone meets with Sister Mary John, taking her to dinner. He asks if Alan or Gino had been trying to recruit young girls, but she hints that the men are gay. He learns that Milly's, where the first victim had been on the night he was killed, was a gay bar, and a favorite destination of Alan and Gino. He suspects that Alan saw Gino and the first victim together there.

With thought, Stone begins to suspect that Alan may have murdered the first victim out of jealousy. To prevent the personal connection being discovered, he murdered two more people (a woman, then a man) to make the events appear to be related and due to a serial killer. Stone confronts Gino, and later Alan with his conclusions. Stone calls Alan and sets up a meeting at Milly's. Alan retrieves the murder weapon and throws it off a pier before meeting Stone. At Milly's Stone sees Alan being killed in a hit and run. Stone and Healy later speculate that Gino ordered the hit, fearing that any confession by Alan would reveal that the crime boss was gay and endanger his underworld reputation.

=== Subplots ===
An unknown assailant has attacked and robbed two convenience store clerks. One of the clerks dies from her injuries, and Stone attends her funeral. While unofficially investigating these incidents, he discovers that the same man is seen on both surveillance videos visiting the stores before the attacks. He thinks that two men may be working as partners in the assaults. Stone has befriended Emily, the sister of the murder victim in Jesse Stone: Death In Paradise. She has dropped out of college and is working at a local convenience store. He shows her the photo of the man from surveillance videos, but she does not recognize him. Stone gives her his cell phone number, asking her to call if she sees him, which she does. He alerts the police and Suitcase and Rose arrive just as the partner attacks her. Stone arrests the first man outside, just as he is leaving the getaway car.

Other characters from previous films also make appearances. Stone continues to see his therapist, Dix, who leads him to recognize his fear of abandonment. Dix sees this in Jesse's relationship with his dog, a golden retriever. He had been close to his previous dog, Boomer, but keeps a distance from the new one, stressing that it isn't his. He adopted the dog, left after his master was killed in the film Stone Cold. Stone says he is only caring for the dog until finding him a new home. Dix notes that Boomer died around the time Stone's wife Jenn left him; he said this coincidence fed the chief's abandonment issues.

Stone is approached again by Cissy, the former Mrs. Hathaway, who suggests she is still interested in an uncomplicated sexual relationship. Based on his friendship with Hathaway, Stone refuses her overture. Since being released from prison, Hathaway opened a used car dealership, and Stone suspects he may have some mob financing. Hathaway tells Stone the town council is planning on firing the suspended chief, and they worry that he corrupted Suitcase and Rose, and plan to fire them, too. Stone tells Suitcase and Rose. The last scene shows them at the hearing with the town council, awaiting their fate.

== Cast ==
- Tom Selleck as Jesse Stone
- Kathy Baker as Officer Rose Gammon
- Kohl Sudduth as Acting Chief Luther "Suitcase" Simpson
- Stephen McHattie as State Homicide Commander Healy
- Krista Allen as Cissy (Hathaway's ex-wife)
- William Sadler as Gino Fish
- Mae Whitman as Emily Bishop
- Todd Hofley as Alan Garner
- Saul Rubinek as Hasty Hathaway
- William Devane as Dr. Dix (Jesse's psychiatrist)
- Rothaford Gray as Mr. Jackson
- Jeremy Akerman as Councilman Carter Hanson
- Brian Heighton as Heartford Clerk
- Kerri Smith as Sister Mary John
- Joe the Dog as Reggie the golden retriever
- Guy Germain as John Kelly
- Tom Gallant as Councilman Comden
- Gay Hauser as Elizabeth
- Stephen Coats as Dad
- Gil Anderson as Jenn (voice), Stone's ex-wife

== Production ==
=== Screenplay ===
Unlike the first four films in the Jesse Stone series, Jesse Stone: No Remorse, the screenplay was written by Tom Selleck and Michael Brandman, who took the plotline in new directions.

=== Filming locations ===
- Halifax, Nova Scotia, Canada.

== Reception ==
=== Awards and nominations ===
- 2010, nominated for American Society of Cinematographers Award for Outstanding Achievement in Cinematography (David Gribble), Motion Picture/Miniseries Television.
