= Chantelouve =

- Part of Chantepérier
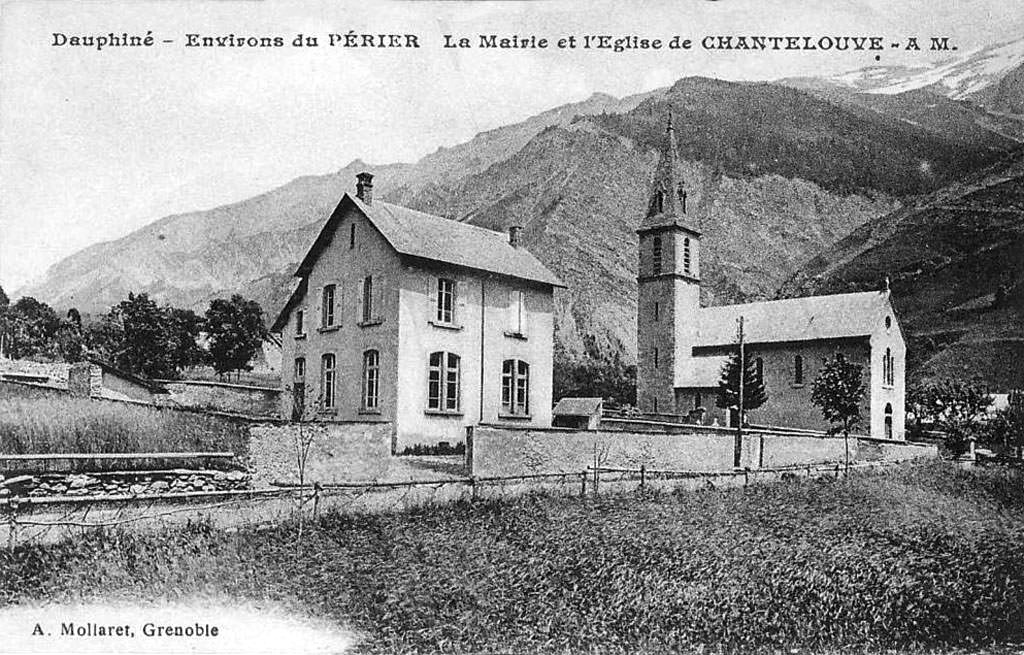
- The church and town hall at the start of the 20th century
- Location of Chantelouve
- Location within France Location within Auvergne-Rhône-Alpes
- Coordinates: 44°59′05″N 5°58′09″E
- Country: France
- Region: Auvergne-Rhône-Alpes
- Department: Isère
- Arrondissement: Grenoble
- Canton: Matheysine-Trièves
- Commune: Chantepérier
- Area^{1}: 33.41 km^{2} (12.90 sq mi)
- Highest elevation: 3,023 m (9,918 ft)
- Lowest elevation: 975 m (3,199 ft)
- Population (2023): 69
  - Density: 2.1/km^{2} (5.3/sq mi)
- Time zone: UTC+01:00 (CET)
  - Summer (DST): UTC+02:00 (CEST)
- Postal code: 38740
- ^{1} French Land Register data, which excludes lakes, ponds, glaciers > 1 km^{2} (0.386 sq mi or 247 acres) and river estuaries.

Chantelouve (French pronunciation: [ʃɑ̃tluv]) is a former commune in the Isère department in southeastern France. On 1 January 2019, it was merged into the new commune Chantepérier.

== See also ==
- Communes of the Isère department
