= Natasja Vermeer =

Dutch model and actress (born 1973)

- Born: 1973 (age 52–53)
- Height: 5 ft 10 in (1.78 m)

Natasja Vermeer (born 1973) is a Dutch model and actress. Vermeer is known for having been the star of the series of films Emmanuelle The Private Collection between 2004 and 2006. Natasja is also a songwriter and singer, and personally took charge of recording two songs for the soundtrack of the films. She also appeared in the film Private Moments in 2005. Natasja is a defender of animal rights and posed naked against the use of fur thus promoting the 2008 campaign of PETA Europe.

== Filmography ==
- Emmanuelle The Private Collection: Emmanuelle Sex Goddess (2003)
- Emmanuelle Private Collection: Emmanuelle vs. Dracula (2004)
- Emmanuelle Private Collection: Sex Talk (2004)
- Emmanuelle Private Collection: The Sex Lives Of Ghosts (2004)
- Emmanuelle Private Collection: Sexual Spells (2004)
- Private Moments (2005)
- Emmanuelle Private Collection: The Art Of Ecstasy (2006)
- Emmanuelle Private Collection: Jesse's Secrets Desires (2006)
- Emmanuelle Tango (2006)
- One Night in My Pants (2009)
