= Alain Siritzky =

American film producer

- Born: 1942; New York City, New York, United States
- Died: October 11, 2014 (aged 71–72); Paris, France
- Occupations: Film producer, film distributor

Alain Siritzky was a French-American film producer and film distributor in softcore pornography, foremost known as the owner of the Emmanuelle franchise from the 1980s to 2010s.

== Early life ==
Siritzky was born in New York City in 1942 where his French Jewish family, a dynasty of film producers in France, took refuge during World War II. His family moved to Paris when he was a youngster.

== Emmanuelle ==
Siritzky's career took a turn after the first Emmanuelle film produced by Yves Rousset-Rouard was released in 1974. He proceeded to become a co-producer in Emmanuelle 2 with his company ASP (Alain Siritzky Productions). After Rousset-Rouard ended the series with Goodbye Emmanuelle in 1977, Siritzky acquired all filming rights to the character. The first Emmanuelle release by ASP to resurrect the character was Emmanuelle 4 in 1984, which was followed by more than 80 Emmanuelle sequels for film, television and video. Krista Allen, Holly Sampson, and Allie Haze were among the actresses who played the title character.

== Other films ==
Beyond the Emmanuelle franchise, Siritzky produced a number of other films. Among the most prominent was 1990's Sex and Perestroïka, depicting the fictional production of one of the first erotic films produced in Russia after the October Revolution, and 2008's Blonde and Blonder, a comedy starring Pamela Anderson and Denise Richards.
