= Emmanuelle Arsan =

Thai-French novelist (1932–2005)

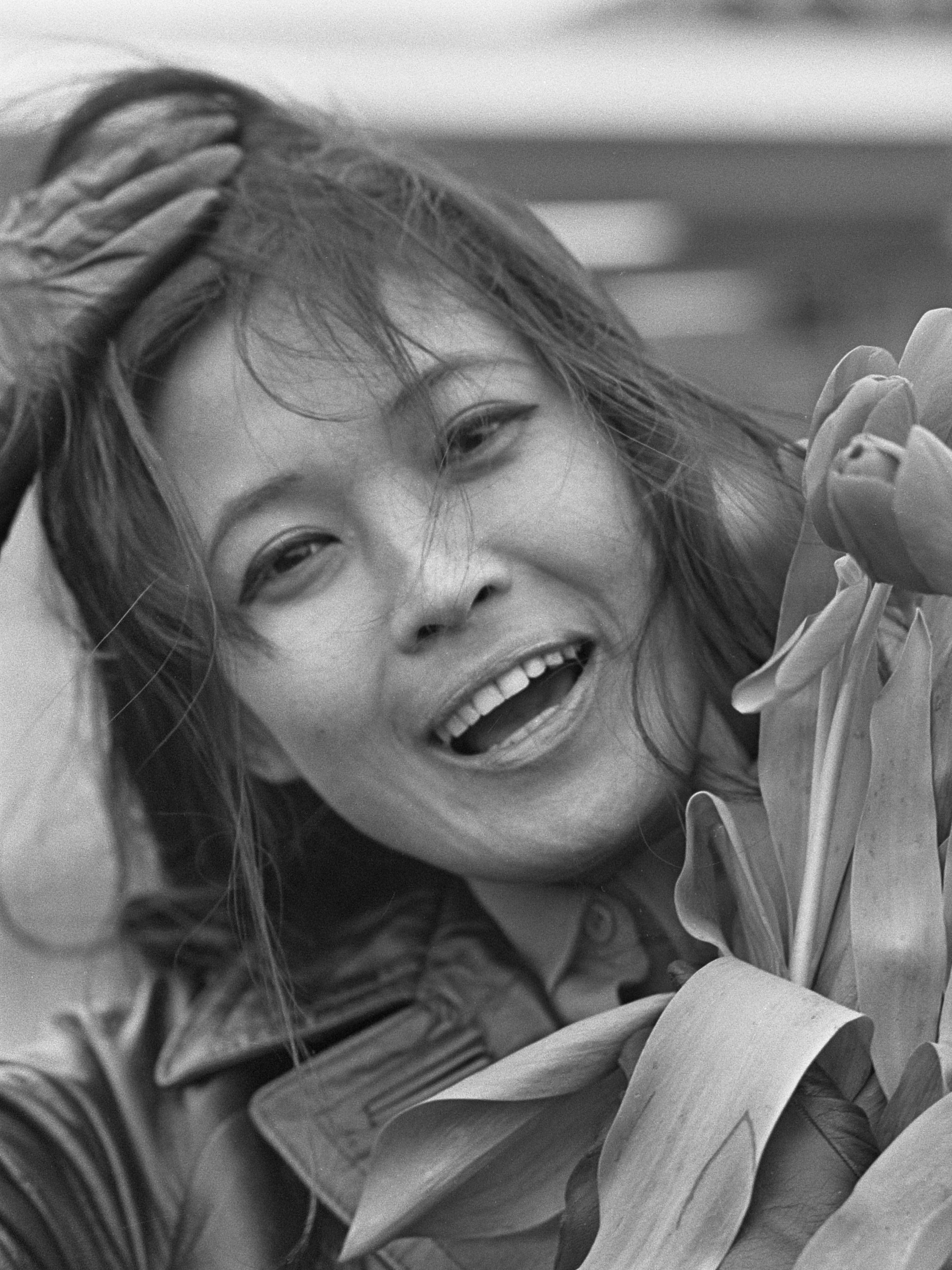
- Arsan in 1967
- Born: Marayat Bibidh; 19 January 1932; Bangkok, Thailand
- Died: 12 June 2005 (aged 73); Chantelouve, France
- Occupations: Writer, novelist, actress
- Spouse: Louis-Jacques Rollet-Andriane (m. 1956)
- Writing career
- Pen name: Marayat, Marayata, Marayat Andriane, Marajat, Kramsaseddinsh, Krasaesundh, Krassaesibor, Virajjakkam, Virajjakam, Virajjakari
- Years active: 1966–1976
- Genres: Fiction, erotica

Marayat Rollet-Andriane (née Krasaesin (Thai: มารยาท กระแสสินธุ์) or Bibidh (Thai: มารยาท พิพิธวิรัชชการ; RTGS: Marayat Phiphitwiratchakan); born 19 January 1932 – 12 June 2005), known by the pen name Emmanuelle Arsan, was a Thai-French writer and actress, best known for the novel featuring the fictional character Emmanuelle, a woman who sets out on a voyage of sexual self-discovery under varying circumstances. After her death, it was claimed that the real author of the book was her husband, diplomat Louis-Jacques Rollet-Andriane.

== Early life ==
Arsan was born Marayat Bibidh on 19 January 1932 in Bangkok, Thailand, into an aristocratic Siamese family closely connected to the royal family. Marayat's family home was in the affluent Ekkamai District of the Thai capital, where she reportedly discovered her sexuality in the company of her little sister Vasana.

After attending primary school in Thailand, Marayat was sent by her parents to Switzerland to continue her studies at the extremely selective Institut Le Rosey boarding school, located in Rolle, Canton of Vaud. The school offered a bilingual English-French education to the offspring of the international elite. At a ball there in 1948, the 16-year-old Marayat first met her future husband, 30-year-old French diplomat Louis-Jacques Rollet-Andriane. Although it was love at first sight, they did not marry until 1956, then settled in Thailand, where Louis-Jacques was given a diplomatic posting at the UNESCO mission in Bangkok.

Within the selective atmosphere of the Sports Club, Louis-Jacques and Marayat, with their hedonistic philosophy of communal sex, quickly created a sensation among the expatriate interlopers, diplomats, pseudospies, bored spouses, and jet-setters who drifted in and out. As a result, the couple's reputation soon spread beyond the restricted circle of the initiated and turned the Thai capital into a popular destination for swingers. At this time, they had their first encounter with the idle Italian Prince Dado Ruspoli, who belonged to the international playboy elite of the 1950s and whose discourse on sex had a profound impact on Marayat and Louis-Jacques. They immediately made Dado their "spiritual guide" and "high priest of love".

In 1963, Louis-Jacques was posted to Italy, and for five years, the couple resided in both Venice and Rome, where they again met Ruspoli. He introduced them to the high society of transalpine libertinage. From 1968 to 1980, Marayat and her husband often alternated between Paris and Bangkok.

== Literary career ==
The novel Emmanuelle was initially published and distributed clandestinely in France in 1959, without an author's name. Successive editions were ascribed to Emmanuelle Arsan, who was subsequently revealed to be Marayat Rollet-Andriane. Though the novel was sometimes hinted to be quasi-autobiographical, it was later revealed that the actual author was her husband Louis-Jacques Rollet-Andriane. Several more novels were published under the Emmanuelle Arsan pseudonym.

Between 1974 and 1976, Arsan and her husband, in association with Just Jaeckin, published the erotic magazine Emmanuelle, le magazine du plaisir (Emmanuelle, the pleasure magazine) in France, contributing photographs and text.

== Film and TV career ==
Following the success of the eponymous 1974 film adaptation of her novel, directed by Just Jaeckin, Arsan was the titular director and scriptwriter of the film Laure (1976) about the sexual discoveries of a younger "Emmanuelle" named Laure, again in an exotic setting. The film was in fact directed by Louis-Jacques Rollet-Andriane and Roberto D'Ettorre Piazzoli, though Rollet-Andriane, reportedly frustrated by problems related to his collaboration with the producer, Ovidio G. Assonitis, asked that Emmanuelle Arsan's name not be associated with the project, resulting in the film being credited to an anonymous director.

Using the screen name "Marayat Andriane", Arsan appeared in the film The Sand Pebbles (1966), and in an episode of the American series The Big Valley ("Turn of a Card", 1967). Although she signed a contract with 20th Century Fox, she never worked as an actress for that company again. Her only other film appearance, credited as Emmanuelle Arsan, was in Laure, which was also released under the alternative title Forever Emmanuelle.

== Personal life ==
Marayat spoke fluent Thai, French, and English. Her hobbies and passions included writing, reading, photography, cinema, and antiques, among others. Louis-Jacques Rollet-Andriane and she had two daughters, Sophie and Danièle. She is known to have had relationships with the French beatnik writer, mime, and photographer Théo Lesouac'h, and allegedly with the American actor Steve McQueen, during the shooting of The Sand Pebbles, although what really went on between them remains a mystery.

== Later life ==
At the beginning of the 1980s, Louis-Jacques and Marayat decided to settle down in France for a much quieter life. An Iranian friend offered the couple a plot of land in the south of the country, near the commune of Callas, in the Var. It was in this woodland domain they constructed their retirement place, "Chantelouve d'Emmanuelle", an isolated single-storey house built around a vast patio. Louis-Jacques continued with his writing, happy to correspond with Emmanuelle's fans under his pen name Emmanuelle Arsan, with the occasional visit to Bangkok. It was at this point that Nitya Phenkun entered their lives. She was an old acquaintance of Louis-Jacques, having been his secretary (and mistress) during his diplomatic posting in Bangkok, and on moving to Chantelouve, she took up her former functions, reportedly forming a threesome with the Rollet-Andriane couple.

== Illness and death ==
In 2001, Marayat suddenly fell ill. She was diagnosed with systemic scleroderma, a rare and incurable autoimmune disease, which had first given her trouble at the age of 20. After a period of remission that had lasted for 49 years, the disease returned and attacked her legs, causing her acute suffering and rapidly affecting her mobility. Her health further deteriorated when gangrene rapidly ensued, and both of her legs had to be amputated above the knee. She was, therefore, forced to spend the remaining four years of her life bedridden, being treated at home by a private nurse. Marayat died on 12 June 2005 at Chantelouve, aged 73. Her husband died three years later, in April 2008.

Nitya Phenkun, the sole beneficiary of the copyright of Emmanuelle, returned to Thailand soon after Louis-Jacques' death, and put the Chantelouve estate up for sale.

== Works ==
=== Books ===
In French

- 1959 Emmanuelle – Éric Losfeld (clandestine edition), 308 pages
- 1960 Emmanuelle L'anti-vierge – Éric Losfeld (clandestine edition), 356 pages
- 1967 Emmanuelle – La leçon d'homme – Paris, Éric Losfeld, Le Terrain Vague, 232 pages
- 1968 Emmanuelle – L'anti-vierge – Paris, Éric Losfeld, Le Terrain Vague, 296 pages
- 1968 Epître à Paul VI (Lettre ouverte au pape, sur la pilule) – Paris, Éric Losfeld
- 1969 Nouvelles de l'érosphère – Paris, Éric Losfeld, Le Terrain Vague, 215 pages
- 1969 Dessins érotiques de Bertrand vol. 1- Pistils ou étamines, une liesse promise – Paris, Eric Losfeld
- 1971 Emmanuelle à Rome (under the pseudonym Bee Van Kleef) – Paris, Eureditions, 280 pages. reprint: Montréal, Les Presses Libres, 1972. reprint: Toulouse, Livre d'Oc, 1979. reprint: Paris, Belfond, 2013
- 1974 Mon "Emmanuelle", leur pape, et mon Éros – Paris, Christian Bourgois, 219 pages
- 1974 L'Hypothèse d'Éros – Paris, Filipacchi, 287 pages
- 1975 Les Enfants d'Emmanuelle – Paris, Opta, 317 pages
- 1976 Laure – Paris, Pierre Belfond, 312 pages
- 1976 Néa – Paris, Opta, 264 pages
- 1978 Toute Emmanuelle – Paris, Pierre Belfond, 224 pages
- 1979 Vanna – Paris, Pierre Belfond, 315 pages
- 1983 Sainte louve – Paris, Pierre Belfond, 352 pages
- 1988 Les Soleils d'Emmanuelle – Paris, Pierre Belfond, 264 pages. reprint: Paris, Belfond, 2013
- 1988 Emmanuelle (Première édition intégrale) [first unabridged edition] – Paris, Robert Laffont/Jean-Jacques Pauvert
- 1989 Les Débuts dans la vie – Paris, Le Grand Livre du mois, 191 pages. reprint: Paris, Belfond, 2013
- 1989 Valadié – Paris, Éditions Lignes, 190 pages
- 1991 Chargée de mission – Paris, Pierre Belfond, 201 pages
- 1993 Bonheur – Les Cahiers de l'Égaré, 91 pages
- 1994 Aurélie – Paris, Pierre Belfond, 213 pages. reprint: Paris, Belfond, 2013
- 2003 La Siamoise nue – Paris, Le Cercle, 552 pages
- 2008 Bonheur 2 – Les Cahiers de l'Égaré, 125 pages
- 2008 Parce qu'ils ne pouvaient pas s'en empêcher, in: Disparition by Michel Bories, Les Cahiers de l'Égaré, 250 pages
- 2016 La Philosophie nue – Éditions Le Sélénite, 116 pages

In English translation

- 1978 Nea A Young Emmanuelle. Translated by Piano, Celeste. St Albans, Herts.: Granada. 1978. ISBN 0583-13053-4. OCLC 1017218723.

=== Film ===
- 1966 The Sand Pebbles
- 1967 The Big Valley (episode "Turn of a Card")
- 1976 Forever Emmanuelle (original title Laure, aka Laura) – The film was shot entirely without synchronized sound, a common practice for European co-productions of the era. The French cast members—including Annie Belle (Laure), Emmanuelle Arsan (Myrte), and Al Cliver—performed their scenes in French, while Italian actor Orso Maria Guerrini spoke Italian. For the film's French-language release, Belle, Arsan, and Cliver post-synchronized their own dialogue, whereas the original Italian theatrical release and the English version (Forever Emmanuelle) utilized entirely separate voice casts for all roles.
