= Krista Allen =

American actress and model (born 1971)

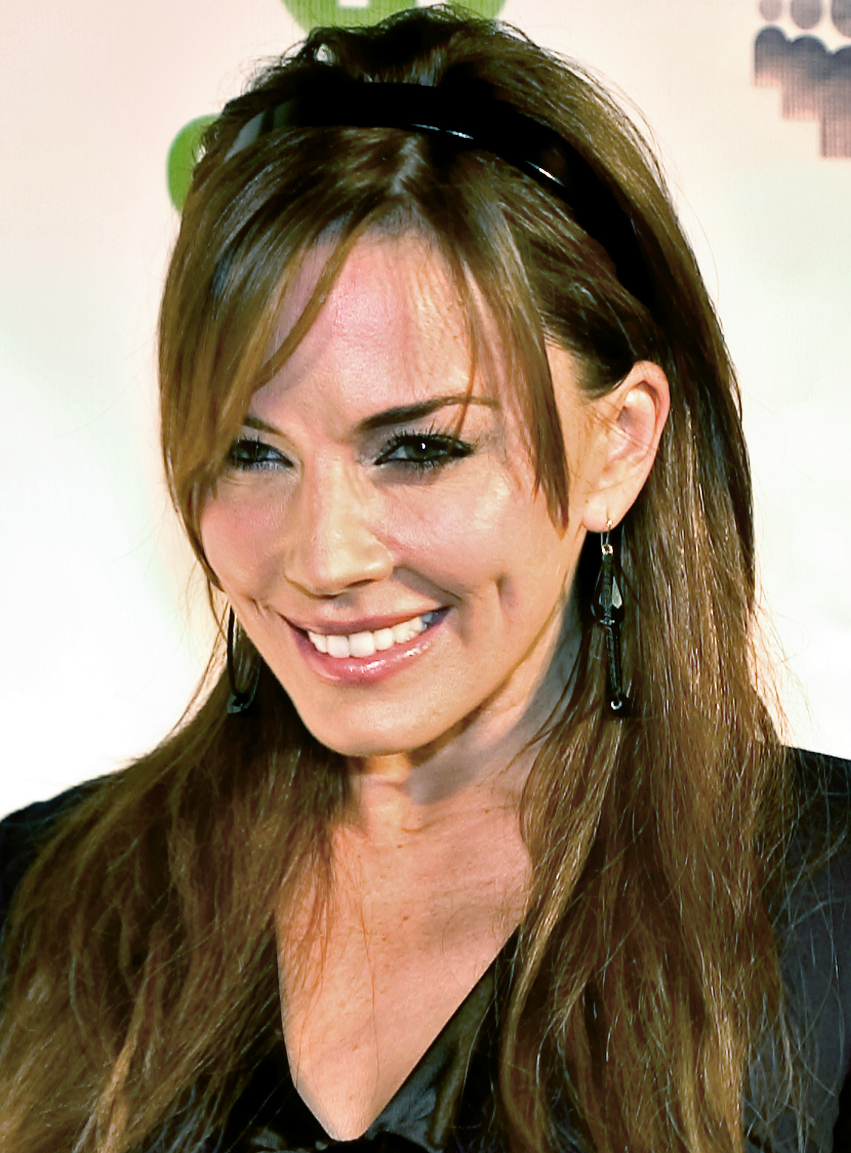
- Allen at the Oxfam America/MySpace Rock for Darfur event in 2006
- Born: April 5, 1971 (age 55); Ventura, California, U.S.
- Other name: Krista Allen-Moritt
- Occupations: Actress; model; comedian
- Years active: 1994–present
- Spouses: Justin Moritt (m. 1996; div. 1999) Mams Taylor (m. 2010; div. 2012)
- Children: 1

Krista Allen (born April 5, 1971) is an American actress, comedian and model. Allen is known for playing soap opera roles, including Billie Reed on Days of Our Lives (1996–1999) and Taylor Hayes on The Bold and the Beautiful (2021–2023), earning a Daytime Emmy Award nomination for the latter and the erotic series Emmanuelle in Space (1994).

Allen held roles in the drama series Baywatch (2000–2001), and played herself in the HBO series Project Greenlight and Unscripted (both 2005). Her film appearances include the comedies Liar Liar (1997) and Anger Management (2003), the biographical spy feature Confessions of a Dangerous Mind (2002) and the supernatural horror The Final Destination (2009).

== Early life ==
Allen was born on April 5, 1971, in Ventura, California, and grew up in Texas. Her parents divorced when she was young and married other people. She has an older brother. When Allen was fourteen, she ran away from home and lived with friends for two years. She said in 1997 that her family was "very disorganized" at the time.

She competed in beauty pageants as a teen and modeled for Budweiser, posing for billboards, catalogs, and calendars. She was also a spokesmodel for World Gym and worked as an aerobics instructor before moving to Los Angeles.

== Career ==
=== 1990s ===
Allen did not intend to become an actress, but met a manager and began getting acting roles. She played the title role in the erotic film series Emmanuelle in Space (1994), before appearing in three episodes of The Bold and the Beautiful in 1995, playing a character named Shelley. She also guest starred on Deadly Games and appeared in two episodes of High Tide.

In 1996, Allen made guest appearances on Silk Stalkings, Diagnosis: Murder, Pacific Blue, and Married... with Children. She played Michelle in the television film Rolling Thunder. She also played Cali in the action film Raven, co-starring with Burt Reynolds. Allen was cast as Billie Reed on the NBC soap opera Days of Our Lives. Her first air date was September 6, 1996. The role had previously been played by Lisa Rinna, who had left the show a year earlier.

Allen had a short but memorable scene with Jim Carrey in the comedy film Liar Liar (1997) as "the elevator girl with big jugs." She had a role in the thriller film The Haunted Sea (1997). Allen made another guest appearance on Pacific Blue in 1999. She played Dr. Katherine 'K' Harrison in the television film Avalon: Beyond the Abyss, co-starring with Parker Stevenson. Allen left Days of Our Lives when her contract ended, last airing November 5, 1999.

=== 2000s ===
She was cast as Jenna Avid on Baywatch Hawaii, playing the role from 2000 to 2001. She played Jennifer in the 1970s period film Sunset Strip (2000). Allen guest starred on The X-Files and 18 Wheels of Justice. From 2000 to 2001, she had a recurring role as Kristy Hopkins on CSI: Crime Scene Investigation.

In 2001, Allen made guest appearances on Arliss, Spin City, Charmed, and Inside Schwartz. She starred as Meg Peters in the comedy film Totally Blonde. Allen appeared in the television film Face Value, written by and co-starring Scott Baio. In 2002, she guest starred on Friends, Glory Days, Mutant X, and Smallville. Allen had a small role in the film Confessions of a Dangerous Mind, directed by and co-starring with George Clooney.

Allen played Stacy in the comedy film Anger Management (2003), co-starring with Adam Sandler. She appeared as Holographic Woman in the action film Paycheck (2003), co-starring with Ben Affleck. Allen had guest starring roles on Fastlane, Andromeda, Just Shoot Me!, Frasier, Two and a Half Men, and The Lyon's Den.

She starred as Tiara Benedette in the comedy film Shut Up and Kiss Me (2004). Allen played Maddy in the comedy film Tony n' Tina's Wedding, co-starring with Mila Kunis. She also starred as Lucinda in the film Meet Market. She made a guest appearance on I'm with Her.

In 2005, Allen guest starred on Monk and Jake in Progress. She had a regular role as Laurie Payne on the Fox series Head Cases, which was cancelled after only a few episodes. She appeared as herself in six episodes of the HBO reality show Project Greenlight. The series focused on the making of the horror film Feast, which Allen had a role in. She starred as herself on HBO's Unscripted, an improvised series about struggling actors, produced by George Clooney and Steven Soderbergh. Allen was featured in Maxim magazine's Girls of Maxim gallery, and was named number 70 on the Maxim "Hot 100 of 2005" list.

Allen guest starred on Freddie and Out of Practice in 2006. She appeared in the music video for "A Little Too Late", by country singer Toby Keith. From 2006 to 2007, Allen had a recurring role as Bridget Keller, a love interest for the title character, on the ABC series What About Brian.

In 2007, Allen starred in the films The Third Nail and All Along. She was cast in Business Class, a pilot for NBC that wasn't picked up. She appeared in the ABC reality television series Fast Cars and Superstars: The Gillette Young Guns Celebrity Race, featuring a dozen celebrities in a stock-car racing competition. In the first round, she matched up against skateboarder Tony Hawk and rodeo champion Ty Murray.

Allen guest starred on Cashmere Mafia in 2008. She also had a recurring role as Eve on The Starter Wife. In 2009, Allen had a recurring role as Dana Whatley on Dirty Sexy Money. She played Waymar in the science fiction film Alien Presence. She played Jessica in the family film Shannon's Rainbow (also titled Amazing Racer). Allen starred as Dr. Andrea Swanson in the science fiction film Silent Venom, co-starring with Luke Perry. She also starred as Samantha in the horror film The Final Destination. Allen appeared as herself on the reality show Denise Richards: It's Complicated. She had a recurring role as Julia Rist on The Philanthropist.

=== 2010s ===
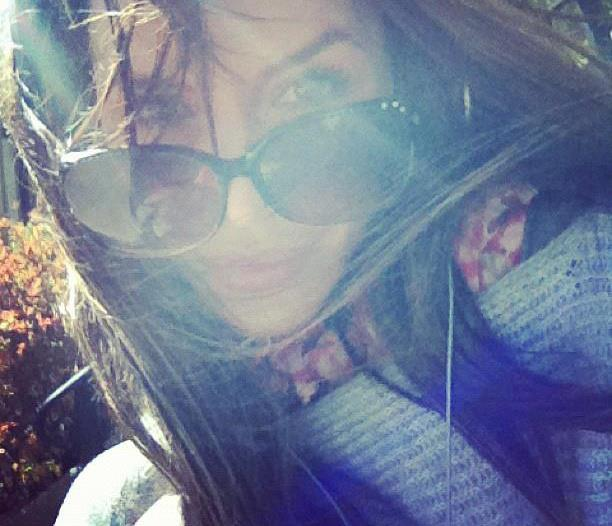
Allen in 2012

In 2010, Allen played Cissy Hathaway in the television film Jesse Stone: No Remorse, co-starring with Tom Selleck. She guest starred on Life Unexpected. She also played Jennifer in the film Black Widow. In 2012, she starred as Doro in the film Little Women, Big Cars. Allen guest starred on Perception. She had a recurring role as Jennifer Bell on The L.A. Complex, a Canadian series that was rebooted in the U.S. on The CW.

Allen made guest appearances on Melissa & Joey and Rules of Engagement in 2013. She played Patricia in the horror film Locker 13 (2014). She guest starred on Hawaii Five-0. Allen played Jen Decker in the film Fatal Instinct. She guest starred on Mistresses and Castle. Allen played Sheila in the film Spare Change (2015). She also played Karen in the film Rodeo & Juliet. Allen had a regular role as Lydia Marlowe on The CW comedy series Significant Mother.

In 2017, she guest starred on Modern Family. She played Brooke in the film This is Meg. Allen and her son, Jake Moritt, appeared as themselves on the Lifetime reality series Growing Up Supermodel.

Allen played Casey Simmons in the film Best Mom (2018), co-starring with Donna Mills. She starred as Jackie in the Lifetime film Party Mom. Her son, Jake Moritt, also had a role in the movie. She also played Ruth Kelly in the Lifetime film The Perfect Mother. Allen starred as Andromeda in the science fiction comedy film Eleven Eleven. For her work in Eleven Eleven, she was nominated for Best Actress at the Burbank International Film Festival. She won the Award of Merit for Leading Actress at the IndieFEST Film Awards and the award for Best Actress at the Hollywood Boulevard Film Festival. Allen played Camille in the Lifetime film I Almost Married a Serial Killer (2019).

=== 2020s ===
Allen starred as Carol in the found footage horror film Case 347 (2020). She played Ruth in the comedy film The 420 Movie: Mary & Jane. Allen played Mrs. Woodley in the Lifetime film The Wrong Stepfather, co-starring with Vivica A. Fox. Allen played Jewel in the thriller film Shadows. For her work in Shadows, she won the award for Best Supporting Actress at the Silver State Film Festival.

In 2021, she played Tracy in the Lifetime film, The Wrong Mr. Right, co-starring again with Vivica. A. Fox. Allen starred as Joan Carr in the thriller film Paradise Cove. She guest starred on 9-1-1. In May 2021, it was announced that she had been cast in the thriller film Five Below. She played Suzanne in the comedy film For the Hits. For her work in For the Hits, she was nominated for Best Lead Actress at the East Europe International Film Festival and Best Actress at the Seattle Film Festival. Allen appeared in the film After Masks, playing Diane in the "Quarantales" segment.

Allen returned to daytime soap operas, playing the role of Taylor Hayes on The Bold and the Beautiful. Her first air date was December 10, 2021. The part had previously been played by Hunter Tylo, who had last appeared on the show in March 2019.

In April 2023, she was nominated for a Daytime Emmy Award for Outstanding Supporting Actress in a Drama Series for her work on The Bold and the Beautiful. In December 2023, Allen announced that she had left The Bold and the Beautiful, as her contract as a series regular had not been renewed and she had declined an offer to recur. Her last air date was November 8, 2023.

== Other ventures ==
=== Activism ===
Allen is a vegan. She has said that it, "reflects who I am as a person and my outlook on the world." She doesn't believe in forcing her beliefs on others, stating, "Those who want to make a change will be open to learning and will eventually figure it out. It’s that simple." She had a blog, Veggie Boom Boom, where she shared recipes and her thoughts about being vegan. In April 2012, she wrote an article for the website Om Times about her journey to becoming vegan.

Allen is a director and spokesperson for R.I.S.E. & Stand, a non-profit which helps educate and raise awareness about bullying, human trafficking, domestic abuse, and animal cruelty. She is an ambassador for Crisis Care L.A., an organization which gives food and support for families struggling through natural disasters. Allen has worked as a motivational speaker and educator for at risk youth and women. She supports the American Society for the Prevention of Cruelty to Animals and No Kid Hungry. She has appeared in a promo for Dream Loud Official, a non-profit to save art and music programs in schools.

=== Business ===
Allen had a T-shirt line for several years, called Superexcellent. She has headlined clubs as a stand-up comedian and worked as a writer on comedy projects for Netflix and HBO. From 2017 to 2018, she hosted a podcast, "I'm Fine" with Krista Allen, reviewing a self-help book with celebrity friends in each episode.

=== Education ===
After working in stand-up comedy in 2017 and 2018, Allen decided to get her GED (General Educational Development), then enrolling in college to study neuroscience and epigenetics. She is now a licensed therapist in the field of complex trauma and addiction recovery; an epigenetics coach, focusing on neurotransmitters and brain development; and an integration coach for entheogenic medicine.

== Personal life ==
=== Relationships ===
On September 14, 1996, Allen married Justin Moritt, a production manager. They have a son born during the marriage. Allen and Moritt divorced in 1999.

In 2002, she began dating George Clooney after they worked together on the film Confessions of a Dangerous Mind. They ended their relationship in 2004, but they were reported to be dating again in 2006 and 2008.

In October 2010, Allen married Iranian–English rapper Mams Taylor. They separated in August 2011 and Allen filed for divorce at Los Angeles County Superior Court on February 12, 2012.

In November 2015, it was reported that Allen was dating actor Nathan Fillion. They met when she guest starred on his series, Castle, in 2014. Their relationship reportedly ended after less than a year together, but some news outlets claimed that they stayed together until 2020.

=== Legal issues ===
In February 2018, Allen said that a woman had broken into her Los Angeles home and attacked her two dogs. Allen walked in on the intruder, who was attempting to steal a vibrator. The police told TMZ that Allen pinned the woman down after calling 911. The intruder had consumed alcohol and pills that were in the house. Allen's dogs recovered after receiving minor injuries.

In 2019, she and her former Baywatch co-star Donna D'Errico were targets of a scam. They received offers to fly to Dubai, give a speech, and receive a $300,000 appearance fee. The scammer claimed to be from the office of the Deputy Prime Minister of the United Arab Emirates and said that the speech would be at an economic empowerment convention for small business owners. The contracts that Allen and D'Errico were sent seemed legit, so they both signed. The organizer in Dubai then claimed to have trouble wiring over the funds. Instead, the scammer deposited checks into the women's bank accounts. Before the checks cleared, the women were asked to donate $150,000 each to a fake charity. Allen and D'Errico became suspicious and decided not to send the donations or any personal information. The checks that the scammer had deposited were revealed to be fraudulent, and the actresses would have lost $300,000 if they had not backed out. Other targets of the scam were Taylor Armstrong and Dog the Bounty Hunter.

== Filmography ==
=== Film ===
Year	Title	Role	Notes
1996	Rolling Thunder	Michelle	TV movie
1996	Raven	Cali Goodwin	Video
1997	Liar Liar	Woman in Elevator	
1997	The Haunted Sea	2nd Mate Johnson	
1999	Avalon: Beyond the Abyss	Dr. Katherine 'K' Harrison	TV movie
2000	Sunset Strip	Jennifer	
2001	Face Value	Syd Deshaye	TV movie
2001	Totally Blonde	Meg Peters	
2002	Confessions of a Dangerous Mind	Pretty Woman	
2003	Anger Management	Stacy	
2003	Paycheck	Holographic Woman	
2004	Shut Up and Kiss Me!	Tiara Benedette	
2004	Tony n' Tina's Wedding	Maddy	
2004	Meet Market	Lucinda	
2005	Feast	Tuffy / Heroine 2	
2007	Leo	Krista	Short
2007	All Along	Dr. Sara Thompson	
2008	The Third Nail	Hannah	
2009	Alien Presence	Waymar	
2009	Shannon's Rainbow	Jessica	
2009	Silent Venom	Dr. Andrea Swanson	Video
2009	The Final Destination	Samantha Lane	
2010	Jesse Stone: No Remorse	Cissy Hathaway	TV movie
2010	Held Up	-	TV movie
2010	Black Widow	Jennifer	
2012	Little Women, Big Cars	Doro	
2012	Little Women, Big Cars 2	Doro	
2013	Shellnapped	Neighbor	Short
2013	The Dream Job	The Cleaner	Short
2014	Locker 13	Patricia	
2014	Fatal Instinct	Jen Decker	
2015	Spare Change	Sheila	
2015	Rodeo & Juliet	Karen Rogers	
2017	Kuso	Weathergirl	
2017	This Is Meg	Brooke	
2017	UnPluG	Elizabeth	Short
2018	Best Mom	Casey Simmons	
2018	Party Mom	Jackie	TV movie
2018	Eleven Eleven	Andromeda	
2018	Almost Perfect	Ruth Kelly	TV movie
2019	I Almost Married a Serial Killer	Camille	TV movie
2019	Beauty Juice	Mara	Short
2020	Case 347	Carol	
2020	Psychos & Socios	Dr. Adams	
2020	The 420 Movie: Mary & Jane	Ruth	
2020	The Wrong Stepfather	Mrs. Woodley	TV movie
2021	The Wrong Mr. Right	Tracy	TV movie
2021	Paradise Cove	Joan Carr	
2021	For the Hits	Suzanne	
2021	After Masks	Diane	
2022	Shadows	Jewel	
2024	Punkin	Mommy	Short

=== Television ===
Year	Title	Role	Notes
1994	Emmanuelle in Space	Emmanuelle	Main Cast
1995	The Bold and the Beautiful	Shelley	Episode: "Episode #1.2030"
1995	Deadly Games	Mrs. Fleisig	Episode: "One Mean Mother"
1995–96	High Tide	Patty	Recurring Cast: Season 2
1996	Silk Stalkings	Cora Jean Riggs/Sharon Grayson	Episode: "Black and Blue"
1996	Diagnosis: Murder	Page Tanner	Episode: "Misdiagnosis Murder"
1996	Married... with Children	Crystal Clark	Episode: "Calendar Girl"
1996	Weird Science	Annabel	Episode: "Gary and Wyatt's Bloodsucking Adventure"
1996	Pacific Blue	Theresa Vanoni	Episode: "Takedown"
1996–99	Days of Our Lives	Billie Reed	Regular Cast
1999	Pacific Blue	Ann Fairchild	Episode: "Just a Gigolo"
2000	To Tell the Truth	Herself	Episode: "November 2, 2000"
2000	The X-Files	Jade Blue Afterglow/Maitreya	Episode: "First Person Shooter"
2000	18 Wheels of Justice	Jessica Macy	Episode: "Smuggler's Blues"
2000–01	CSI: Crime Scene Investigation	Kristy Hopkins	Recurring Cast: Season 1
2000–01	Baywatch	Jenna Avid	Recurring Cast: Season 10, Main Cast: Season 11
2001	Rendez-View	Herself	Episode: "Bartender Pours on the Charm"
2001	Arli$$	Krista	Episode: "Hard Choices"
2001	Spin City	Jesse	Episode: "Yeah Baby!"
2001	Charmed	The Oracle	Recurring Cast: Season 4
2001	Inside Schwartz	Kelsie Anders	Episode: "Comic Relief Pitcher"
2002	Friends	Mable	Episode: "The One Where Joey Dates Rachel"
2002	Glory Days	Melanie Stark	Episode: "Miss Fortune Teller"
2002	Mutant X	Lorna Templeton	Episode: "Deadly Desire"
2002	Smallville	Desiree Atkins	Episode: "Heat"
2003	The New Tom Green Show	Herself	Episode: "August 20, 2003"
2003	Fastlane	Skyler Kase	Episode: "Defense: Part 1 & Offense: Part 2"
2003	Andromeda	The Princess	Episode: "The Illusion of Majesty"
2003	Just Shoot Me!	Mary Elizabeth	Episode: "The Last Temptation of Elliot"
2003	Frasier	Liz Wright	Episode: "The Placeholder"
2003	Two and a Half Men	Olivia Pearson	Episode: "Did You Check with the Captain of the Flying Monkeys?"
2003	The Lyon's Den	Gloria	Episode: "The Quantum Theory" & "Separation Anxiety"
2004	The 100 Scariest Movie Moments	Herself	Episode: "Part I: 100-81"
2004	I'm with Her	Jennifer	Episode: "I'm Not with Her"
2005	Unscripted	Herself	Main Cast
2005	Project Greenlight	Herself	Recurring Cast: Season 3
2005	Monk	Teresa Telenko	Episode: "Mr. Monk Goes to Vegas"
2005	Jake in Progress	Lisa	Episode: "Take a Number"
2005	Head Cases	Laurie Payne	Main Cast
2006	Out of Practice	Kathy Kelly	Episode: "Restaurant Row"
2006	Freddie	Kaitlyn	Episode: "Freddie and the Hot Mom"
2006–07	What About Brian	Bridget Keller	Recurring Cast: Season 2
2007	Fast Cars and Superstars	Herself	Episode: "Part 1 & 2"
2008	Cashmere Mafia	Victoria	Episode: "Conference Call"
2008	The Starter Wife	Eve	Recurring Cast
2009	Denise Richards: It's Complicated	Herself	Episode: "Vegas, Baby" & "Funbags or Die"
2009	Dirty Sexy Money	Dana Whatley	Episode: "The Unexpected Arrival" & "The Bad Guy"
2009	The Philanthropist	Julia Rist	Recurring Cast
2010	Life Unexpected	Candace Carter	Episode: "Homecoming Crashed"
2011	The Protector	Miss Monroe	Episode: "Pilot"
2011	Love Bites	Janine	Episode: "Sky High"
2012	Perception	Allison Bannister	Episode: "Lovesick"
2012	The L.A. Complex	Jennifer Bell	Recurring Cast: Season 2
2013	Rules of Engagement	Heidi	Episode: "Timmy Quits"
2013	Melissa & Joey	Candice	Episode: "Teach Your Children"
2014	Hawaii Five-0	Nani Kahanu	Episode: "Ho'i Hou"
2014	Mistresses	Janine Winterbaum	Episode: "Boundaries" & "Friends With Benefits"
2014	Castle	Naomi Duvray	Episode: "Last Action Hero"
2015	Significant Mother	Lydia Marlowe	Main Cast
2016	The #Hashtagged Show	Herself	Episode: "GOT Mood?"
2017	Growing Up Supermodel	Herself	Episode: "The New Wave"
2017	Modern Family	Flight Attendant	Episode: "Five Minutes"
2021	9-1-1	Meegan	Episode: "There Goes the Neighborhood"
2021–23	The Bold and the Beautiful	Taylor Hayes	Regular Cast

== Awards and nominations ==
Year	Award	Category	Title	Result	Ref.
2018	Burbank International Film Festival	Best Actress	Eleven Eleven	Nominated	
2018	IndieFEST Film Awards	Award of Merit: Special Mention for Leading Actress	Eleven Eleven	Won	
2018	Hollywood Boulevard Film Festival	Best Actress	Eleven Eleven	Won	
2021	Silver State Film Festival	Best Supporting Actress	Shadows	Won	
2021	East Europe International Film Festival	Best Lead Actress	For the Hits	Nominated	
2021	Seattle Film Festival	Best Actress	For the Hits	Nominated	
2023	Daytime Emmy Award	Outstanding Supporting Actress in a Drama Series	The Bold and the Beautiful	Nominated	
