= 1966 in film =

The year 1966 in film involved some significant events. A Man for All Seasons won six Academy Awards, including Best Picture.

== Top-grossing films ==
=== North America ===
The top ten 1966 released films by box office gross in North America are as follows:

Highest-grossing films of 1966
Rank	Title	Distributor	Domestic rentals
1	Hawaii	United Artists	$15,600,000
2	The Bible: In the Beginning...	20th Century Fox	$15,000,000
3	Who's Afraid of Virginia Woolf?	Warner Bros.	$14,500,000
4	The Sand Pebbles	20th Century Fox	$13,500,000
5	A Man for All Seasons	Columbia	$12,800,000
6	The Russians Are Coming, the Russians Are Coming	United Artists	$9,800,000
7	Grand Prix	MGM	$9,300,000
8	The Professionals	Columbia	$8,800,000
9	Alfie	Paramount	$8,500,000
10	Georgy Girl	Columbia	$7,600,000

=== Outside North America ===
The highest-grossing 1966 films in countries outside North America.

Country	Title	Studio	Gross
India	Phool Aur Patthar	Ralhan Productions	$11,790,000 (Note: ₹7.5 crore; 6.3591 Indian rupees per US dollar in 1966)
Soviet Union	War and Peace	Mosfilm	$64,000,000 (Note: 58 million Rbls, 0.9 Rbl per US dollar from 1961 to 1971)

== Events ==
- October 19 – Gulf and Western Industries acquire Paramount Pictures.
- November – Seven Arts Productions reach agreement to acquire Warner Bros. for $32 million, later forming a new company Warner Bros.-Seven Arts.
- December 15 – Entertainment pioneer Walt Disney, best known for his creation of Mickey Mouse, breakthroughs in the field of animation, filmmaking, theme park design and other achievements, dies at the age of 65. He died while he was producing The Jungle Book, The Happiest Millionaire, and Winnie the Pooh and the Blustery Day; the last three films under his personal supervision.

== Awards ==
Academy Awards:

Best Picture: A Man for All Seasons – Highland, Columbia
Best Director: Fred Zinnemann – A Man for All Seasons
Best Actor: Paul Scofield – A Man for All Seasons
Best Actress: Elizabeth Taylor – Who's Afraid of Virginia Woolf?
Best Supporting Actor: Walter Matthau – The Fortune Cookie
Best Supporting Actress: Sandy Dennis – Who's Afraid of Virginia Woolf?
Best Foreign Language Film: A Man and a Woman (Un homme et une femme), directed by Claude Lelouch, France

BAFTA Film Awards:

Best Film from any Source: Who's Afraid of Virginia Woolf?
Best British film: The Spy Who Came In from the Cold

Golden Globe Awards:

Drama:
Best Picture: A Man for All Seasons
Best Actor: Paul Scofield – A Man for All Seasons
Best Actress: Anouk Aimée – A Man and a Woman

Comedy or Musical:
Best Picture: The Russians Are Coming, the Russians Are Coming
Best Actor: Alan Arkin – The Russians Are Coming, the Russians Are Coming
Best Actress: Lynn Redgrave – Georgy Girl

Other
Best Supporting Actor: Richard Attenborough – The Sand Pebbles
Best Supporting Actress: Jocelyne LaGarde – Hawaii
Best Director: Fred Zinnemann – A Man for All Seasons

Palme d'Or (Cannes Film Festival):

A Man and a Woman (Un homme et une femme), directed by Claude Lelouch, France
Signore & Signori (The Birds, the Bees and the Italians), directed by Pietro Germi, Italy

Italian National Syndicate of Film Journalists, Location: Italy

Silver Ribbon

- Best Actor winner in Questa volta parliamo di uomini (This Time Let's Talk about Men): Nino Manfredi
  - Nominee in The 10th Victim: Marcello Mastroianni
  - A third nominee was not determined.
- Best Actress winner in La fuga: Giovanna Ralli
  - Nominees in Juliet of the Spirits: Giulietta Masina and in The Mandrake: Rosanna Schiaffino
- Best Supporting Actor winner in I Knew Her Well: Ugo Tognazzi
  - Nominees in The Mandrake: Totò and Romolo Valli
- Best Supporting Actress winner in Juliet of the Spirits: Sandra Milo
  - Nominee in Made in Italy Anna Magnani
  - A third nominee was not determined.
- Best Director winner in I Knew Her Well: Antonio Pietrangeli
  - Nominees in Fists in the Pocket: Marco Bellocchio and in Juliet of the Spirits: Federico Fellini
- Best Foreign Director winner in The Servant: Joseph Losey
  - Nominees in Hamlet (1964 film): Grigori Kozintsev and in King and Country: Joseph Losey
- Best Screenplay winner in I Knew Her Well: Ettore Scola, Antonio Pietrangeli and Ruggero Maccari
  - Nominees in Fists in the Pocket: Marco Bellocchio and in Sandra: Suso Cecchi d'Amico, Enrico Medioli, Luchino Visconti
- Best Cinematography, B/W winner in Sandra: Armando Nannuzzi
- Best Cinematography, Color winner in Juliet of the Spirits: Gianni Di Venanzo. In memory of.
- Best Costume Design winner in Juliet of the Spirits: Piero Gherardi
- Best Score winner in Seven Golden Men: Armando Trovajoli
- Best Producer – Short Film winner in Con il cuore fermo Sicilia: Clodio Cinematografica
- Best Short Film winner in Antonio Ligabue, pittore: Raffaele Andreassi
- Best Original Story winner in Fists in the Pocket: Marco Bellocchio
  - Nominees in I Knew Her Well: Ruggero Maccari, Ettore Scola, Antonio Pietrangeli and in Seven Golden Men: Marco Vicario
- Best Producer winner in Seven Golden Men: Marco Vicario
  - Nominee in Fists in the Pocket: Enzo Doria
  - A third nominee was not determined.
- Best Production Design winner in Juliet of the Spirits: Piero Gherardi.

Golden Lion (Venice Film Festival):

The Battle of Algiers (La Battaglia di Algeri), directed by Gillo Pontecorvo, Algeria / Italy

Golden Bear (Berlin Film Festival):

Cul-de-sac, directed by Roman Polanski, United Kingdom

== 1966 film releases ==
United States unless stated

=== January–March ===
- January 1966
  - 5 January
    - 7 Women
    - Agent for H.A.R.M.
  - 9 January
    - Dracula: Prince of Darkness (U.K.)
  - 16 January
    - Our Man Flint
  - 20 January
    - The Ghost and Mr. Chicken
    - Judith
  - 27 January
    - Moment to Moment
- February 1966
  - 2 February
    - The Rare Breed
  - 9 February
    - Made in Paris
  - 12 February
    - Drop Dead Darling
  - 18 February
    - The Silencers
  - 19 February
    - The Chase
  - 21 February
    - Lord Love a Duck
  - 23 February
    - Harper
  - 25 February
    - The Sword of Doom (Japan)
- March 1966
  - 2 March
    - Blood Bath
  - 4 March
    - The Group
    - The Oscar
  - 5 March
    - The Magic Serpent (Japan)
  - 9 March
    - Johnny Reno
  - 14 March
    - Born Free (U.K.)
    - War and Peace Part I (USSR)
  - 25 March
    - A Man Could Get Killed (U.K.)
  - 30 March
    - Cast a Giant Shadow
    - Hold On!
    - The Trouble with Angels
  - 31 March
    - Frankie and Johnny

=== April–June ===
- April 1966
  - 1 April
    - Hold On!
  - 4 April
    - The Singing Nun
  - 6 April
    - Django
  - 7 April
    - Hold Me While I'm Naked
  - 10 April
    - Tokyo Drifter (Japan)
  - 13 April
    - The Dirty Game
  - 17 April
    - Daimajin (Japan)
    - Gamera vs. Barugon (Japan)
- May 1966
  - 5 May
    - Arabesque (U.K.)
    - Our Man in Marrakesh (U.K.)
    - Modesty Blaise (U.K.)
  - 11 May
    - The Fat Spy
  - 14 May
    - Destination Inner Space
  - 19 May
    - The Deadly Bees (U.K.)
  - 25 May
    - Au hasard Balthazar (France)
    - Blindfold
    - The Last of the Secret Agents?
    - The Russians Are Coming, the Russians Are Coming
  - 27 May
    - The Wrong Box (U.K.)
  - 31 May
    - A Big Hand for the Little Lady
- June 1966
  - 1 June
  - 7 June
    - Fireball 500
  - 8 June
    - Boy, Did I Get a Wrong Number!
  - 9 June
    - The Glass Bottom Boat
    - Paradise, Hawaiian Style
  - 10 June
    - Nevada Smith
  - 15 June
    - Assault on a Queen
    - Duel at Diablo
    - Munster, Go Home!
    - Stagecoach
    - The Endless Summer
  - 21 June
    - The Blue Max
  - 22 June
    - Around the World Under the Sea
    - Who's Afraid of Virginia Woolf?
    - The Daydreamer
  - 29 June
    - A Fine Madness
    - Walk, Don't Run

=== July–September ===
- July 1966
  - 1 July
    - Incident at Phantom Hill
  - 7 July
    - Three on a Couch
  - 12 July
    - A Man and a Woman (France)
  - 13 July
    - How to Steal a Million
  - 14 July
    - Torn Curtain
  - 20 July
    - War and Peace Part II (USSR)
    - The Wild Angels
  - 29 July
    - Lt. Robin Crusoe, U.S.N.
  - 30 July
    - Batman
  - 31 July
    - The War of the Gargantuas (Japan)
- August 1966
  - 3 August
    - The Man Called Flintstone
    - This Property Is Condemned
  - 5 August
    - Daleks – Invasion Earth: 2150 A.D. (U.K.)
  - 10 August
    - The Idol
  - 13 August
    - Return of Daimajin (Japan)
  - 16 August
    - The Plainsman
  - 24 August
    - Alfie
    - Fantastic Voyage
  - 31 August
    - Persona (Sweden)
    - What Did You Do in the War, Daddy?
- September 1966
  - 1 September
    - Waco
  - 2 September
    - The Brides of Fu Manchu
  - 7 September
    - Beau Geste
  - 8 September
    - After the Fox
    - Kiss the Girls and Make Them Die
  - 14 September
    - Ambush Bay
    - Lost Command
  - 15 September
    - The Appaloosa
    - Chelsea Girls
  - 16 September
    - Fahrenheit 451 (U.K.)
  - 28 September
    - The Bible: In the Beginning...

=== October–December ===
- October 1966
  - 5 October
    - Seconds
  - 9 October
    - Alvarez Kelly
  - 10 October
    - Hawaii
  - 11 October
    - Mister Buddwing
  - 12 October
    - Dead Heat on a Merry-Go-Round
  - 13 October
    - Any Wednesday
  - 16 October
    - A Funny Thing Happened on the Way to the Forum (U.S./U.K.)
    - The Poppy Is Also a Flower
  - 17 October
    - Georgy Girl
    - Spinout
  - 19 October
    - The Fortune Cookie
    - Return of the Seven
  - 23 October
    - Ride in the Whirlwind
    - The Shooting
  - 24 October
    - 10:30 P.M. Summer
  - 26 October
    - Way...Way Out
  - 27 October
    - Texas Across the River
  - 28 October
    - An American Dream
    - Chamber of Horrors
    - Nashville Rebel
- November 1966
  - 2 November
    - Not with My Wife, You Don't!
    - The Professionals
    - What's Up, Tiger Lily?
  - 5 November
    - Chappaqua
  - 7 November
    - Cul-de-sac
  - 8 November
    - Madame X
  - 10 November
    - Is Paris Burning? (France)
    - Penelope
    - Wings (USSR)
  - 18 November
    - Let's Kill Uncle
  - 19 November
    - Castle of Evil
- December 1966
  - 1 December
    - Follow Me, Boys!
  - 8 December
    - La Grande Vadrouille (France)/(U.K.)
  - 9 December
    - Once Before I Die
    - Triple Cross
    - You're a Big Boy Now
  - 10 December
    - Daimajin Strikes Again (Japan)
  - 12 December
    - A Man for All Seasons
    - Thunderbirds Are Go
  - 15 December
    - The Good, the Bad and the Ugly
    - The Quiller Memorandum
  - 16 December
    - Andrei Rublev (USSR)
  - 17 December
    - El Dorado
    - Godzilla vs. the Sea Monster (Japan)
    - Rage
  - 18 December
    - Blowup
  - 20 December
    - Murderers' Row
    - The Sand Pebbles
  - 21 December
    - Gambit
    - Grand Prix
  - 21 December
    - King of Hearts (France)
  - 22 December
    - Funeral in Berlin (U.K./U.S.)
  - 30 December
    - One Million Years B.C. (U.K.)

== Notable films released in 1966 ==
United States unless stated

=== # ===
- 10:30 P.M. Summer, directed by Jules Dassin and starring Melina Mercouri and Romy Schneider
- 7 Women, the last film of John Ford, starring Anne Bancroft, Flora Robson, Margaret Leighton, Mildred Dunnock, Anna Lee

=== A ===
- Aakhri Khat (The Last Letter) – (India)
- Adobe and Mirror, directed by Ebrahim Golestan, starring Mohammad Ali Keshavarz, Jamshid Mashayekhi and Pari Saberi (Iran)
- After the Fox, starring Peter Sellers and Victor Mature
- Alfie, directed by Lewis Gilbert, starring Michael Caine, Shelley Winters, Millicent Martin – (U.K.)
- Alice in Wonderland, a TV film starring John Gielgud, Peter Cook, Peter Sellers – (U.K.)
- Alvarez Kelly, starring William Holden
- Ambush Bay, starring Hugh O'Brian, Mickey Rooney and James Mitchum
- An American Dream, starring Stuart Whitman, Janet Leigh, Eleanor Parker
- Amrapali, starring Vyjayanthimala and Sunil Dutt – (India)
- Andrei Rublev, directed by Andrei Tarkovsky – (USSR)
- The Appaloosa, starring Marlon Brando
- Arabesque, directed by Stanley Donen, starring Sophia Loren and Gregory Peck
- Around the World Under the Sea, starring Lloyd Bridges
- As Long as You've Got Your Health (Tant qu'on a la santé), directed by and starring Pierre Étaix – (France)
- Assault on a Queen, starring Frank Sinatra, Virna Lisi, Anthony Franciosa
- Au hasard Balthazar (Chosen by Lot Balthazar), directed by Robert Bresson – (France/Sweden)
- Aybolit-66 – (USSR)

=== B ===
- Bariera (Barrier), directed by Jerzy Skolimowski – (Poland)
- Batman, starring Adam West, Burt Ward, Burgess Meredith, Cesar Romero, Lee Meriwether, Frank Gorshin
- The Battle of Algiers, directed by Gillo Pontecorvo – Golden Lion winner – (Italy/Algeria)
- Beau Geste, directed by Douglas Heyes
- Beregis Avtomobilya (Beware of the Automobile) – (USSR)
- The Bible: In the Beginning..., directed by John Huston, starring Stephen Boyd, Franco Nero, Ava Gardner, Richard Harris, Peter O'Toole
- The Big Gundown (La resa dei conti), starring Lee Van Cleef – (Italy)
- A Big Hand for the Little Lady, starring Henry Fonda, Joanne Woodward, Jason Robards, Burgess Meredith, Kevin McCarthy
- The Birds, the Bees and the Italians (Signore & Signori), directed by Pietro Germi – (Italy)
- Birds Do It, starring Soupy Sales
- Black Girl (La Noire de...), directed by Ousmane Sembène – (France/Senegal)
- Blindfold, directed by Philip Dunne, starring Rock Hudson and Claudia Cardinale
- Blowup, directed by Michelangelo Antonioni, starring David Hemmings and Vanessa Redgrave—winner of Palme d'Or, 1967 Cannes Film Festival – (Italy/U.K./U.S.)
- The Blue Max, starring George Peppard, James Mason, Ursula Andress – (U.K.)
- Borom Sarret (The Wagoner) – (Senegal)
- Born Free, starring Virginia McKenna and Bill Travers – (U.K.)
- Boy, Did I Get a Wrong Number!, starring Bob Hope, Phyllis Diller, Elke Sommer
- A Bullet for the General (El Chucho, quién sabe?), starring Gian Maria Volonté and Klaus Kinski – (Italy)

=== C ===
- Cairo 30 (Al-Kahira 30), directed by Salāḥ Abu Seif – (Egypt)
- Carry On Screaming!, starring Harry H. Corbett and Kenneth Williams – (U.K.)
- Cast a Giant Shadow, starring Kirk Douglas, Senta Berger, Yul Brynner, John Wayne and Frank Sinatra
- Chafed Elbows, directed by Robert Downey Sr.
- Chappaqua, featuring William S. Burroughs
- The Chase, directed by Arthur Penn, starring Marlon Brando, Jane Fonda, Angie Dickinson and Robert Redford
- Chelsea Girls, directed by Andy Warhol, starring Nico
- Chimes at Midnight (a.k.a. Falstaff), directed by and starring Orson Welles, with Jeanne Moreau and John Gielgud – (France/Spain/Switzerland)
- Cinerama's Russian Adventure, a documentary on the USSR introduced by Bing Crosby
- Circus of Fear, starring Christopher Lee, Leo Genn, Klaus Kinski– (U.K.)
- Closely Watched Trains (Ostře sledované vlaky), directed by Jiří Menzel – (Czechoslovakia)
- Come Drink with Me (Da zui xia), directed by King Hu – (Hong Kong)
- Congress of Love, starring Curd Jürgens and Lilli Palmer (Austria/France/W. Germany)
- The Crazy-Quilt, directed by John Korty
- Cul-de-sac, directed by Roman Polanski, starring Donald Pleasence and Françoise Dorléac – (U.K.)
- Curse of the Swamp Creature, starring John Agar, Francine York
- Curse of the Vampires (Dugo ng vampira, a.k.a. Blood of the Vampires or Creatures of Evil), directed by Gerardo de León – (Philippines)
- Cyborg 2087, starring Michael Rennie and Wendell Corey

=== D ===
- Daimajin, directed by Kimiyoshi Yasuda – (Japan)
- Daisies (Sedmikrásky), directed by Věra Chytilová – (Czechoslovakia)
- Daleks – Invasion Earth: 2150 A.D., starring Peter Cushing – (U.K.)
- The Daydreamer, a Rankin-Bass and Embassy Pictures stop-motion/live-action film
- Dead Heat on a Merry-Go-Round, starring James Coburn, Camilla Sparv, Robert Webber and Rose Marie
- The Deadly Bees, directed by Freddie Francis and starring Suzanna Leigh – (U.K.)
- Death of a Bureaucrat (La muerte de un burócrata), directed by Tomás Gutiérrez Alea – (Cuba)
- The Defector, directed by Raoul Lévy and starring Montgomery Clift, Hardy Krüger and Macha Méril – (France/West Germany)
- Degueyo, directed by Giuseppe Vari – (Italy)
- Destination Inner Space, starring Gary Merrill and Sheree North
- The Diabolical Dr. Z (Miss Muerte), directed by Jesús Franco – (France/Spain)
- Dimension 5, starring Jeffrey Hunter
- Django, starring Franco Nero – (Italy/Spain)
- Don't Look Now, We're Being Shot At (La grande vadrouille), starring Terry-Thomas and Bourvil – (France/U.K.)
- Le deuxieme souffle (a.k.a. Second Breath), directed by Jean-Pierre Melville, starring Lino Ventura – (France)
- Dr. Goldfoot and the Girl Bombs (Le spie vengono dal semifreddo), directed by Mario Bava – (Italy/U.S.)
- Dracula: Prince of Darkness, starring Christopher Lee – (U.K.)
- Drop Dead Darling, starring Tony Curtis
- Duel at Diablo, starring James Garner and Sidney Poitier
- Dutchman, starring Al Freeman, Jr. and Shirley Knight

=== E ===
- Ebirah, Horror of the Deep (Gojira, Ebira, Mosura Nankai no Daikettō), directed by Jun Fukuda – (Japan)
- El Dorado, directed by Howard Hawks, starring John Wayne, Robert Mitchum and James Caan
- The Elusive Avengers (Neulovimye mstiteli), directed by Edmond Keosayan – (USSR)
- Eye of the Devil, directed by J. Lee Thompson, starring Deborah Kerr, David Niven and Sharon Tate

=== F ===
- The Face of Another (Tanin no kao) – (Japan)
- Fahrenheit 451, directed by François Truffaut, starring Julie Christie and Oskar Werner – (U.K.)
- The Family Way, a Boulting brothers film, starring Hayley Mills and Hywel Bennett – (U.K.)
- Fantastic Voyage, directed by Richard Fleischer, starring Stephen Boyd and Raquel Welch
- The Fat Spy, starring Phyllis Diller, Jayne Mansfield, Brian Donlevy
- Fighting Elegy (Kenka erejii), directed by Seijun Suzuki – (Japan)
- A Fine Madness, starring Sean Connery and Joanne Woodward
- Fireball 500, starring Frankie Avalon, Annette Funicello, Fabian Forte
- Follow Me, Boys!, directed by Norman Tokar, starring Fred MacMurray, Vera Miles, Kurt Russell
- For Love and Gold (L'armata Brancaleone), directed by Mario Monicelli, starring Vittorio Gassman – (Italy)
- The Fortune Cookie (a.k.a. Meet Whiplash Willie), directed by Billy Wilder, starring Jack Lemmon and Walter Matthau
- Frankie and Johnny, starring Elvis Presley and Donna Douglas
- Funeral in Berlin, starring Michael Caine – (U.K.)
- A Funny Thing Happened on the Way to the Forum, directed by Richard Lester, starring Zero Mostel, Jack Gilford, Phil Silvers, Michael Crawford – (U.S./U.K.)

=== G ===
- Galia, directed by Georges Lautner and starring Mireille Darc – (France/Italy)
- Gambit, starring Michael Caine and Shirley MacLaine
- The Game Is Over (La curée), directed by Roger Vadim and starring Jane Fonda – (France/Italy)
- Gamera vs. Barugon, directed by Shigeo Tanaka – (Japan)
- Georgy Girl, directed by Silvio Narizzano, starring Lynn Redgrave, James Mason and Alan Bates – (U.K.)
- The Ghost and Mr. Chicken, starring Don Knotts
- The Ghost in the Invisible Bikini, starring Deborah Walley, Tommy Kirk, Nancy Sinatra
- The Glass Bottom Boat, starring Doris Day and Rod Taylor
- Godzilla vs. the Sea Monster (Gojira, Ebira, Mosura Nankai no Daikettō) – (Japan)
- The Good, the Bad and the Ugly, directed by Sergio Leone, starring Clint Eastwood, Eli Wallach and Lee Van Cleef– (Italy)
- Grand Prix, directed by John Frankenheimer, starring James Garner, Yves Montand, Toshiro Mifune, Eva Marie Saint, Jessica Walter
- The Great St Trinian's Train Robbery, starring Frankie Howerd and Dora Bryan – (U.K.)
- The Group, directed by Sidney Lumet, starring Candice Bergen, Shirley Knight, Joan Hackett, Joanna Pettet and Jessica Walter
- Gunpoint, starring Audie Murphy, Joan Staley and Warren Stevens

=== H ===
- Harper, starring Paul Newman, Robert Wagner, Lauren Bacall, Pamela Tiffin, Julie Harris, Arthur Hill, Janet Leigh
- Hawaii, directed by George Roy Hill, starring Julie Andrews, Max von Sydow, Richard Harris
- The Hawks and the Sparrows (Uccellacci e uccellini), directed by Pier Paolo Pasolini, starring Totò – (Italy)
- The Hellbenders (I Crudeli), starring Joseph Cotten – (Italy)
- Here Is Your Life (Här har du ditt liv) – (Sweden)
- The Hills Run Red (Un Fiume di dollari), directed by Carlo Lizzani – (Italy)
- Hold On!, starring Peter Noone and Shelley Fabares
- How to Steal a Million, directed by William Wyler, starring Audrey Hepburn and Peter O'Toole
- Hotel Paradiso, directed by Peter Glenville and starring Alec Guinness – (U.K.)
- The Hunchback of Soho (Der Bucklige von Soho), directed by Alfred Vohrer – (West Germany)
- Hunger (Sult) – (Denmark/Norway/Sweden)
- The Hunt (La Caza), directed by Carlos Saura – (Spain)

=== I ===
- The Idol, directed by Daniel Petrie and starring Jennifer Jones and Michael Parks – (U.K.)
- Incident at Phantom Hill, directed by Earl Bellamy
- Is Paris Burning? (Paris brûle-t-il?), directed by René Clément, starring Jean-Paul Belmondo, Charles Boyer, Leslie Caron – (France/United States)
- Island of Terror, starring Peter Cushing, Edward Judd, Carole Gray
- It Happened Here, starring Sebastian Shaw – (U.K.)

=== J ===
- Jack Frost (Морозко), directed by Alexander Rou – (USSR)
- John F. Kennedy: Years of Lightning, Day of Drums, a documentary narrated by Gregory Peck and directed by Bruce Herschensohn
- Johnny Reno, starring Jane Russell
- Johnny Yuma, directed by Romolo Girolami and starring Mark Damon – (Italy)
- Judith, starring Sophia Loren and Peter Finch – (Israel/U.K./U.S.)

=== K ===
- Kaleidoscope, directed by Jack Smight, starring Warren Beatty – (U.K.)
- Khartoum, directed by Basil Dearden, starring Charlton Heston and Laurence Olivier – (U.K.)
- Kill, Baby, Kill, directed by Mario Bava– (Italy)
- King of Hearts (Le roi de cœur), directed by Philippe de Broca, starring Alan Bates – (France)
- Kriminal – (Italy/Spain)

=== L ===
- Let's Kill Uncle, directed by William Castle
- Lightning Bolt (Operazione Goldman), directed by Antonio Margheriti – (Italy)
- Lord Love a Duck, starring Roddy McDowall and Tuesday Weld
- Lost Command, directed by Mark Robson, starring Anthony Quinn, George Segal, Alain Delon, Claudia Cardinale
- Lt. Robin Crusoe, U.S.N., starring Dick Van Dyke and Nancy Kwan

=== M ===
- Madame X, starring Lana Turner
- Made in Paris, starring Ann-Margret, Louis Jourdan, Chad Everett, Edie Adams
- Made in U.S.A., directed by Jean-Luc Godard, starring Anna Karina and Jean-Pierre Léaud – (France)
- Mademoiselle, directed by Tony Richardson, starring Jeanne Moreau – (France/U.K.)
- Mamta, starring Ashok Kumar – (India)
- A Man and a Woman, directed by Claude Lelouch, starring Anouk Aimée and Jean-Louis Trintignant -- Palme d'Or winner – (France)
- The Man Called Flintstone, directed by Joseph Barbera and William Hanna
- A Man for All Seasons, directed by Fred Zinnemann, starring Paul Scofield, Robert Shaw, Orson Welles – winner of 6 Academy Awards and 5 BAFTAs – (U.K.)
- A Man Could Get Killed, starring James Garner and Sandra Dee
- Manos: The Hands of Fate, starring and written, directed and produced by Harold P. Warren
- Masculine-Feminine by Jean-Luc Godard, starring Jean-Pierre Léaud – (France)
- Mera Saaya (My Shadow), starring Sunil Dutt and Sadhana – (India)
- Mission to Death
- Mister Buddwing, directed by Delbert Mann, starring James Garner, Jean Simmons, Angela Lansbury, Suzanne Pleshette, Katharine Ross
- Misunderstood (Incompreso), directed by Luigi Comencini – (Italy)
- Modesty Blaise, starring Monica Vitti and Terence Stamp – (U.K.)
- Moment to Moment, starring Jean Seberg and Honor Blackman
- Morgan! (a.k.a. Morgan: A Suitable Case for Treatment), directed by Karel Reisz – (U.K.)
- Munster, Go Home!, starring Fred Gwynne, Yvonne De Carlo, Al Lewis
- Murderers' Row, starring Dean Martin (as Matt Helm), with Karl Malden, Camilla Sparv, Ann-Margret
- My Wife, the Director General, directed by Fatin Abdel Wahab, starring Salah Zulfikar and Shadia – (Egypt)

=== N ===
- Namu, the Killer Whale, directed by László Benedek
- Navajo Joe, starring Burt Reynolds – (Italy/Spain)
- Nayak, directed by Satyajit Ray – (India)
- Nevada Smith, starring Steve McQueen, Karl Malden, Martin Landau, Suzanne Pleshette and Arthur Kennedy
- Night Games (Nattlek), directed by Mai Zetterling and starring Ingrid Thulin – (Sweden)
- Nobody Wanted to Die (Niekas nenorėjo mirti) – (USSR)
- Not with My Wife, You Don't!, starring Tony Curtis, George C. Scott and Virna Lisi
- The Nun (La religieuse), directed by Jacques Rivette, starring Anna Karina – (France)

=== O ===
- Once Before I Die, starring Ursula Andress and John Derek
- One Million Years B.C., starring Raquel Welch – (U.K.)
- Operazione San Gennaro (a.k.a. The Treasure of San Gennaro), starring Nino Manfredi and Senta Berger – (Italy)
- The Oscar, starring Stephen Boyd, Elke Sommer, Jill St. John, Tony Bennett
- Our Man Flint, starring James Coburn
- Our Man in Marrakesh, a.k.a. Bang! Bang! You're Dead!, starring Tony Randall

=== P ===
- The Pad and How to Use It, directed by Brian G. Hutton
- Paradise, Hawaiian Style, starring Elvis Presley
- Penelope, starring Natalie Wood, Peter Falk, Dick Shawn, Jonathan Winters, Ian Bannen and Arlene Golonka
- Le Père Noël a les yeux bleus (Father Christmas Has Blue Eyes), starring Jean-Pierre Léaud – (France)
- Persona, directed by Ingmar Bergman, starring Bibi Andersson and Liv Ullmann – (Sweden)
- Pharaoh (Faraon), directed by Jerzy Kawalerowicz – (Poland)
- Phool Aur Patthar, starring Dharmendra – (India)
- Picture Mommy Dead, starring Don Ameche and Zsa Zsa Gabor
- The Plague of the Zombies, starring André Morell – (U.K.)
- The Plainsman, starring Don Murray, Abby Dalton and Leslie Nielsen
- The Poppy Is Also a Flower, directed by Terence Young, starring Senta Berger, Stephen Boyd, Rita Hayworth, Yul Brynner and Angie Dickinson
- The Pornographers (Erogotoshitachi yori Jinruigaku nyumon), directed by Shōhei Imamura – (Japan)
- The Priest and the Girl (O Padre e a Moça) – (Brazil)
- The Professionals, directed by Richard Brooks, starring Lee Marvin, Burt Lancaster, Robert Ryan, Woody Strode, Jack Palance and Claudia Cardinale
- The Projected Man, starring Mary Peach, Bryant Haliday and Ronald Allen– (U.K.)

=== Q ===
- Queen of Blood, starring John Saxon, Basil Rathbone and Dennis Hopper
- The Quiller Memorandum, starring George Segal, Alec Guinness, Max von Sydow and Senta Berger – (U.K./U.S.)

=== R ===
- Rage, starring Glenn Ford and Stella Stevens
- The Rare Breed, starring James Stewart, Maureen O'Hara, Brian Keith and Juliet Mills
- A Report on the Party and the Guests (O slavnosti a hostech), directed by Jan Němec – (Czechoslovakia)
- The Reptile, starring Noel Willman, Ray Barrett and Jennifer Daniel– (U.K.)
- Return of the Seven, starring Yul Brynner, Robert Fuller, Claude Akins and Warren Oates
- Ride in the Whirlwind, directed by Monte Hellman, starring Jack Nicholson and Millie Perkins
- Ringo and His Golden Pistol (Johnny Oro), directed by Sergio Corbucci and starring Mark Damon – (Italy)
- Roman Candles, directed by John Waters
- Rondo, directed by Zvonimir Berković– (Yugoslavia)
- Rosalie, a short directed by Walerian Borowczyk – (France)
- The Round-Up (Szegénylegények), directed by Miklós Jancsó – (Hungary)
- Run, Appaloosa, Run, starring Rex Allen
- The Russians Are Coming, the Russians Are Coming, directed by Norman Jewison, starring Alan Arkin, Jonathan Winters, Carl Reiner and Eva Marie Saint

=== S ===
- The Sand Pebbles, directed by Robert Wise, starring Steve McQueen, Richard Attenborough, Candice Bergen and Richard Crenna
- The Sandwich Man, starring Michael Bentine and Dora Bryan – (U.K.)
- Savage Pampas, starring Robert Taylor, Ron Randell and Marc Lawrence (U.S./Spain/Argentina)
- Seconds, directed by John Frankenheimer, starring Rock Hudson
- The She Beast, starring Barbara Steele, John Karlsen, Ian Ogilvy
- Shiroi Kyotō (The White Tower) – (Japan)
- The Shooting, starring Warren Oates, Jack Nicholson and Millie Perkins
- Sri Krishna Pandaveeyam, directed by and starring N. T. Rama Rao – (India)
- The Silencers, starring Dean Martin, Stella Stevens, Daliah Lavi, Cyd Charisse and Nancy Kovack
- The Singing Nun, starring Debbie Reynolds and Greer Garson
- Sound of Horror, starring James Philbrook, Arturo Fernandez and Soledad Miranda
- Spinout, starring Elvis Presley
- The Spy with a Cold Nose, directed by Daniel Petrie – (U.K.)
- Stagecoach, starring Ann-Margret, Bing Crosby, Red Buttons, Alex Cord, Mike Connors and Stefanie Powers
- Stop the World – I Want to Get Off, directed by Philip Saville
- Suraj, starring Vyjayanthimala and Rajendra Kumar – (India)
- The Swinger, starring Ann-Margret, Tony Franciosa and Yvonne Romain
- The Sword of Doom (Dai-bosatsu tōge) – (Japan)

=== T ===
- Tarzan and the Valley of Gold, starring Mike Henry and Nancy Kovack
- Teesri Kasam (Third Oath), starring Raj Kapoor – (India)
- Texas Across the River, starring Dean Martin, Alain Delon, Rosemary Forsyth, Peter Graves, Joey Bishop
- They're a Weird Mob, directed by Powell and Pressburger – (Australia)
- This Property Is Condemned, directed by Sydney Pollack, starring Natalie Wood, Robert Redford, Charles Bronson, Kate Reid
- Three on a Couch, directed by and starring Jerry Lewis, with Janet Leigh, Leslie Parrish, Mary Ann Mobley
- Thunderbirds Are Go, produced by Gerry Anderson and Sylvia Anderson, voices of Peter Dyneley, Shane Rimmer, Matt Zimmerman, David Graham, Christine Finn, Sylvia Anderson, Jeremy Wilkin, Ray Barrett
- Time to Die (Tiempo de morir), directed by Arturo Ripstein, starring Marga López and Jorge Martínez de Hoyos – (Mexico)
- Tokyo Drifter (Tōkyō nagaremono), directed by Seijun Suzuki – (Japan)
- Torn Curtain, directed by Alfred Hitchcock, starring Paul Newman and Julie Andrews
- Trace of Stones (Spur der Steine) – (East Germany)
- The Trap, starring Rita Tushingham and Oliver Reed – (U.K./Canada)
- Triple Cross, starring Christopher Plummer, Claudine Auger, Gert Fröbe – (U.K./France)
- The Trouble with Angels, directed by Ida Lupino, starring Rosalind Russell and Hayley Mills
- Trunk to Cairo, directed by Menahem Golan, starring Audie Murphy – (Israel)
- The Trygon Factor, starring Stewart Granger, Susan Hampshire and Robert Morley – (U.K./West Germany)

=== U ===
- The Ugly Dachshund, directed by Norman Tokar and starring Dean Jones and Suzanne Pleshette
- Ukamau (And So it Is) – (Bolivia)
- The Uncle, directed by Desmond Davis and starring Rupert Davies – (U.K.)

=== V ===
- A Very Handy Man (Liolà), directed by Alessandro Blasetti – (Italy)
- Very Happy Alexander (Alexandre le bienheureux), directed by Yves Robert, starring Philippe Noiret – (France)

=== W ===
- Waco, starring Jane Russell and Howard Keel
- Walk, Don't Run, starring Cary Grant (in his final film), Samantha Eggar, Jim Hutton
- The War Is Over (La Guerre est Finie), directed by Alain Resnais, starring Yves Montand and Ingrid Thulin – (France)
- The War of the Gargantuas (Furankenshutain no Kaijū: Sanda tai Gaira) – (Japan)
- Way...Way Out, starring Jerry Lewis and Connie Stevens
- What Did You Do in the War, Daddy?, directed by Blake Edwards, starring James Coburn and Dick Shawn
- Where the Spies Are, directed by Val Guest and starring David Niven – (U.K.)
- Who Are You, Polly Maggoo? (Qui êtes vous, Polly Maggoo?) – (France)
- Who's Afraid of Virginia Woolf?, directed by Mike Nichols, starring Elizabeth Taylor, (Best Actress Oscar), Richard Burton, George Segal, Sandy Dennis
- The Wild Angels, starring Peter Fonda and Nancy Sinatra
- Wings (Крылья), directed by Larisa Shepitko – (USSR)
- Winnetou and the Crossbreed (Winnetou und das Halbblut Apanatschi), directed by Harald Philipp – (West Germany)
- Winnie the Pooh and the Honey Tree (animated short)
- The Witches, starring Joan Fontaine
- The Wrong Box, starring John Mills, Michael Caine, Peter Cook, Nanette Newman – (U.K.)

=== Y ===
- Yesterday Girl, directed by Alexander Kluge – (West Germany)
- Young Törless (Der junge Törless), directed by Volker Schlöndorff – (West Germany)
- You're a Big Boy Now, directed by Francis Ford Coppola, starring Peter Kastner, Elizabeth Hartman, Karen Black, Julie Harris

=== Z ===
- Zatoichi's Pilgrimage (Zatōichi umi o wataru), directed by Kazuo Ikehiro – (Japan)
- Zatoichi's Vengeance (Zatōichi no uta ga kikoeru) is a 1966 Japanese chambara film directed by Tokuzō Tanaka

== Short film series ==
- Looney Tunes (1930–1969)
- Merrie Melodies (1931–1969)
- Sylvester the Cat (1944–1966)
- Speedy Gonzales (1953–1968)
- Daffy Duck (1937–1968)

== Births ==
- January 2 – Kate Hodge, American actress and producer
- January 8
  - Adrian Pang, Singaporean actor
  - Maria Pitillo, American former actress
- January 13 – Patrick Dempsey, American actor
- January 17 – Joshua Malina, American actor
- January 20 – Rainn Wilson, American actor, comedian, writer, director and producer
- January 24 – Julie Dreyfus, French actress
- January 31 – Dexter Fletcher, English film director and actor
- February 1 – Anthony Johnson, American actor and comedian (d. 2021)
- February 3 - Frank Coraci, American director, actor and screenwriter
- February 4 – Piret Kalda, Estonian actress
- February 10 - Meadow Williams, American actress and producer
- February 12 – Lochlyn Munro, Canadian actor
- February 13 – Neal McDonough, American actor and producer
- February 14 – Kristen Dalton, American actress
- February 15
  - Mo Gallini, American actor
  - Cynthia Lamontagne, American former actress
  - Kim Myers, American actress
- February 19 – Justine Bateman, American actress, writer, director and producer
- February 20 - Louis Ferreira, Canadian actor
- February 22 – Rachel Dratch, American actress, comedian, writer and producer
- February 24
  - Ben Miller, English actor
  - Sherrie Rose, American actress, producer, director and screenwriter
  - Billy Zane, American actor
- February 25
  - Alexis Denisof, American actor
  - Téa Leoni, American actress
- February 26 - Jennifer Grant, American actress
- February 27 – Donal Logue, Canadian-Irish actor, producer and writer
- March 1
  - Michelle Berube, American actress
  - JD Cullum, American actor
  - Zack Snyder, American director, producer, screenwriter and cinematographer
- March 3
  - Tone Loc, American rapper and actor
  - Heidi Swedberg, American former actress
- March 4
  - Steve Bastoni, Italian-born Australian actor
  - Wash Westmoreland, British director
- March 5 – Aasif Mandvi, British-American actor and comedian
- March 9 – Alison Doody, Irish model and actress
- March 10 – Stephen Mailer, American actor
- March 12 - Jane Perry, British-Canadian actress
- March 14
  - Elise Neal, American actress
  - Gary Anthony Williams, American actor, comedian and filmmaker
- March 22 – Sara Crowe, Scottish actress
- March 23 – Marin Hinkle, American actress
- March 26 – Michael Imperioli, American actor
- April 8 – Robin Wright, American actress
- April 9 – Cynthia Nixon, American actress
- April 12 - Vusi Kunene, South African actor
- April 13 – Andy Nyman, English actor, director and writer
- April 14 – Lloyd Owen, British actor
- April 22 – Jeffrey Dean Morgan, American actor and producer
- April 27 – Matt Reeves, American director, producer and screenwriter
- May 1
  - Anne Fletcher, American director and actress
  - Tina Lifford, American actress
- May 3 – Firdous Bamji, Indian actor and writer
- May 4
  - Murray McArthur, English actor
  - Stefano Sollima, Italian director and screenwriter
- May 8 – Eileen Bowman, American actress
- May 10 – Ilian Djevelekov, Bulgarian film director and producer
- May 12
  - Stephen Baldwin, American actor
  - Deborah Kara Unger, Canadian actress
- May 14 - Anthony DiMaria, American actor, producer and director
- May 15
  - Sommore, American comedian and actress
  - Greg Wise, English actor and producer
- May 16 – Scott Reeves, American actor and country music singer
- May 17 - Hill Harper, American actor
- May 19 – Polly Walker, English actress
- May 20 – Mindy Cohn, American actress and voice actress
- May 23 – H. Jon Benjamin, American actor and comedian
- May 24 - Eric Cantona, French actor
- May 26 – Helena Bonham Carter, English actress
- May 27 - Francesco Cabras, Italian actor and director
- May 28 - Roger Kumble, American director and screenwriter
- May 30 - Fahim Fazli, Afghan-American actor
- June 1 - Sean Harris, English actor
- June 4 - Robert Pralgo, American actor
- June 5 – Dwayne Hill, Canadian voice actor
- June 7 – Tom McCarthy, American director, screenwriter and actor
- June 8 – Julianna Margulies, American actress
- June 10
  - Doug McKeon, American actor
  - Laura Silverman, American actress
- June 16 – Phil Vischer, American filmmaker, animator, musician and voice actor
- June 17 - Jason Patric, American actor
- June 19 – Samuel West, English actor, director and voice actor
- June 22
  - Carlos Gallardo, Mexican actor, producer, screenwriter and director
  - Emmanuelle Seigner, French actress
- June 24 – Adrienne Shelly, American actress, director and screenwriter (d. 2006)
- June 27 – J. J. Abrams, American filmmaker and composer
- June 28
  - John Cusack, American actor, brother of actress Joan Cusack
  - Şenay Gürler, Turkish actress
  - Mary Stuart Masterson, American actress
  - Sara Stewart, Scottish actress
- June 29 – DJ Pooh, American rapper, actor and filmmaker
- June 30
  - Ian Bliss, Australian character actor
  - Marton Csokas, New Zealand actor
  - Peter Outerbridge, Canadian actor
- July 5
  - Charles Herman-Wurmfeld, American director
  - Claudia Wells, American actress
- July 6
  - Mark Mitchinson, English-born New Zealand actor
  - Brian Posehn, American stand-up comedian, actor, voice actor, musician and writer
- July 7
  - Jim Gaffigan, American stand-up comedian, actor, writer and producer
- July 8 – Mike Nawrocki, American director, animator, writer and voice actor
- July 9
  - Pamela Adlon, American actress, voice actress, screenwriter, producer and director
  - Jamie Bartlett, British-born South African actor (d. 2022)
- July 10 – A. O. Scott, American film critic of The New York Times
- July 11
  - Debbe Dunning, American actress
  - Greg Grunberg, American actor
  - Elina Löwensohn, Romanian-American actress
- July 12 – Tamsin Greig, English actress, narrator and comedian
- July 14 – Matthew Fox, American actor
- July 15 – Irène Jacob, French-born Swiss actress
- July 16
  - Scott Derrickson, American filmmaker
  - Fabrizio Gifuni, Italian actor
- July 18 – Lori Alan, American actress and voice actress
- July 19 – Nancy Carrell, American actress, comedian and writer
- July 22 - Jamie McShane, American actor
- July 31
  - Dean Cain, American actor, producer and television presenter
  - Jim True-Frost, American actor
- August 1 – Dan Gerson, American screenwriter and voice actor (d. 2016)
- August 5
  - James Gunn, American filmmaker and actor
  - Jonathan Silverman, American actor
- August 8 – Verónica Falcón, Mexican actress
- August 10 – André Sogliuzzo, American voice actor
- August 12 - Sharon D. Clarke, English actress and singer
- August 14 – Halle Berry, American actress
- August 15
  - Con O'Neill, English actor
  - Tasha de Vasconcelos, Mozambican-born Portuguese-Canadian actress
- August 17
  - Tom Gallop, American actor
  - Matt Maiellaro, American filmmaker, musician and voice actor
- August 18
  - Sarita Choudhury, British actress
  - María Onetto, Argentine actress (d. 2023)
- August 19 - Chris McGarry, American actor
- August 20
  - Colin Cunningham, American actor
  - David Rees Snell, American actor
- August 25 – Julia Davis, English actress, comedian, director and writer
- August 28 – Enzo Squillino Jr., British actor
- August 29 – Stacey Travis, American actress
- August 30 – Michael Michele, American actress
- September 1 – James Nguyen, Vietnamese filmmaker
- September 2
  - Salma Hayek, Mexican actress
  - Tuc Watkins, American actor
- September 5 - Achero Mañas, Spanish director and former actor
- September 7 – Toby Jones, English actor
- September 9
  - David Bennent, Swiss actor
  - Adam Sandler, American actor
- September 12
  - Darren E. Burrows, American actor
  - Khaled El Nabawy, Egyptian actor
- September 13 – Louis Mandylor, Australian actor
- September 16 – Sean Frye, American former actor
- September 18 - Christopher Shyer, Canadian-American actor
- September 20 – Niki Caro, New Zealand film director and screenwriter
- September 22
  - Ira Heiden, American actor
  - Ruth Jones, Welsh actress, comedian, writer and producer
- September 25 – Jason Flemyng, English actor
- September 28 - Leilani Sarelle, American actress
- September 29
  - Ben Miles, English actor
  - Jill Whelan, American actress
- September 30
  - Gustavo Sánchez Parra, Mexican actor
  - Lisa Thornhill, American actress
- October 1 - George Asprey, British character actor
- October 6 – Jacqueline Obradors, American actress
- October 9 – Tim Herlihy, American actor, producer and screenwriter
- October 10 - Bai Ling, Chinese-American actress
- October 11 – Luke Perry, American actor (d. 2019)
- October 16
  - Marco Greco, American actor
  - Mary Elizabeth McGlynn, American voice actress
- October 17 – Mark Gatiss, English actor, comedian, screenwriter, director and producer
- October 18 - Guillaume de Tonquédec, French actor
- October 19 – Jon Favreau, American actor, director, producer and screenwriter
- October 24 – Zahn McClarnon, American actor
- October 26 – Steve Valentine, English actor
- October 28
  - Chris Bauer, American actor
  - Alois Moyo, Zimbabwean-German actor
  - Andy Richter, American actor, writer, comedian and talk show announcer
- October 31 - Mike O'Malley, American actor, writer and producer
- November 2 – David Schwimmer, American actor, director and producer
- November 3
  - Vincent Franklin, English actor
  - Jonathan Loughran, American actor
- November 5 – Leni Parker, Canadian actress
- November 6 – Peter DeLuise, American actor
- November 10 - Vanessa Angel, English actress
- November 11 – Vince Colosimo, Australian actor
- November 16 - Tony Cervone, American director, animator, writer and voice actor
- November 17 – Sophie Marceau, French actress and director
- November 19
  - Wolfgang Bodison, American actor
  - Jason Scott Lee, American actor and martial artist
- November 22
  - Nicholas Rowe, British actor
  - Michael K. Williams, American actor (d. 2021)
- November 23
  - Vincent Cassel, French actor
  - Michelle Gomez, Scottish-American actress
- November 25 – Billy Burke, American actor
- November 26
  - Kristin Bauer van Straten, American actress
  - Garcelle Beauvais, Haitian actress and television personality
- December 1 – Andrew Adamson, New Zealand director, producer and screenwriter
- December 2 – Katherine LaNasa, American actress
- December 4
  - Fred Armisen, American actor and comedian
  - Carey Means, American voice and stage actor
- December 7 – C. Thomas Howell, American actor
- December 8
  - Johannes Krisch, Austrian actor (d. 2026)
  - Tyler Mane, Canadian character actor
  - Scott Shepherd, American actor
  - Sinéad O'Connor, Irish actress and singer (d. 2023)
- December 9 – Toby Huss, American actor
- December 11 - Gary Dourdan, American actor
- December 12 – Lydia Zimmermann, Spanish filmmaker
- December 14 – Boris Isaković. Serbian actor
- December 19 – Robert MacNaughton, American actor
- December 20 – Paul Ritter, English actor (d. 2021)
- December 21
  - Martin Bayfield, English actor and stuntman
  - Michelle Hurd, American actress
  - Kiefer Sutherland, Canadian actor
- December 24 – Diedrich Bader, American actor and voice actor
- December 28 - David Fane, New Zealand actor
- December 30 – Akosua Busia, Ghanaian actress and writer
- December 31
  - Bruce Ramsay, Canadian actor
  - Maddie Taylor, American voice actress and comedian

== Deaths ==
- January 3 – Rex Lease, 62, American actor, Rough Riding Ranger, Borrowed Wives
- January 17 – Vincent J. Donehue, 50, American director, Lonelyhearts, Sunrise at Campobello
- January 22 – Herbert Marshall, 75, British actor, The Letter, The Little Foxes
- January 31 – Elizabeth Patterson, 90, American actress, The Shocking Miss Pilgrim, Remember the Night
- February 1
  - Buster Keaton, 70, American actor and director, The General, Sherlock Jr.
  - Hedda Hopper, 80, American gossip columnist and actress, Sunset Boulevard, Topper
- February 9 – Sophie Tucker, 80, Russian-born American singer and actress, Thoroughbreds Don't Cry, Broadway Melody of 1938
- February 17 - Gail Kane, 80, American stage and film actress, Arizona, The Jungle, The Serpent's Tooth, The White Sister
- February 18 – Robert Rossen, 57, American writer and director, The Hustler, All the King's Men
- February 19 – James Edward Grant, 60, American writer and director, Angel and the Badman, The Alamo
- February 26 – Mientje Kling, 71, Dutch actress, The Devil in Amsterdam
- March 3
  - William Frawley, 79, American actor, Miracle on 34th Street, The Lemon Drop Kid
  - Alice Pearce, 48, American actress, On the Town, The Disorderly Orderly
- March 12 – Estelita Rodriguez, 40, Cuban actress, Tropical Heat Wave, Rio Bravo
- March 26 – Cyril Hume, 66, American screenwriter, The Great Gatsby, Forbidden Planet
- April 6
  - Julia Faye, 73, American actress, Chicago, The Ten Commandments
  - Edna Flugrath, 73, American silent-film actress, The Derby Winner, The Pursuit of Pamela
- April 16 – Marjie Millar, 34, American actress, Money from Home, About Mrs. Leslie
- June 5 – Natacha Rambova, 69, American actress, Salomé, Monsieur Beaucaire
- June 11 – Wallace Ford, 68, British-born American actor, Another Face, 3 Ring Circus
- June 19 – Ed Wynn, 79, American actor, Alice in Wonderland, Mary Poppins
- July 5 – John P. Fulton, 63, American special effects supervisor, The Ten Commandments
- July 6 – Anne Nagel, 50, American actress, Under the Big Top, My Little Chickadee
- July 23
  - Douglass Montgomery, 59, American actor, Little Women, Waterloo Bridge
  - Montgomery Clift, 45, American actor, From Here to Eternity, A Place in the Sun
- August 3 – Lenny Bruce, 40, American satirist
- August 15
  - Jan Kiepura, 64, Polish tenor and actor, My Song for You
  - Seena Owen, 71, American actress, Queen Kelly, Victory
- August 23 – Francis X. Bushman, 83, American actor, Ben-Hur, The Phantom Planet
- August 25 – Lance Comfort, 58, British director, Penn of Pennsylvania, Eight O'Clock Walk
- August 26 – Art Baker, 68, American actor, Cover Up, The Farmer's Daughter
- August 29 – Joseph Egger, 77, Austrian actor, A Fistful of Dollars, For a Few Dollars More
- September 14 – Nikolai Cherkasov, 63, Soviet actor, Alexander Nevsky, Ivan the Terrible, Part II
- September 22 – Jules Furthman, 78, American screenwriter, The Big Sleep, To Have and Have Not
- October 13 – Clifton Webb, 76, American actor, Laura, The Man Who Never Was
- October 16 – George O'Hara, 67, American actor and writer, Side Street, The Grapes of Wrath
- October 23
  - Eugenio Bava, 80, Italian cinematographer, Cabiria, Quo Vadis
  - Claire McDowell, 88, American actress, The Mark of Zorro, Ben-Hur
- October 24 – Hans Dreier, 81, German art director of European and American films, Sunset Boulevard, Double Indemnity
- November 3 – Byron Barr, 49, American actor, Double Indemnity, Pitfall
- November 9 – James V. Kern, 57, American screenwriter and director, Never Say Goodbye, Two Tickets to Broadway
- December 14
  - Emma Dunn, 91, British actress, Mother, Life with Father
  - Verna Felton, 76, American actress and voice actress, Picnic, Cinderella
  - Richard Whorf, 60, American actor and director, Christmas Holiday, Yankee Doodle Dandy
- December 15 – Walt Disney, 65, American producer, cartoonist and studio executive, Steamboat Willie, Cinderella, Fantasia
- December 19 – Betty Kuuskemaa, 87, Estonian actress, Elu tsitadellis, Pöördel
- December 22
  - Harry Beaumont, 78, American director, The Broadway Melody, Enchanted April
  - Robert Keith, 68, American actor, The Lineup, Written on the Wind

== Film debuts ==
- Yves Afonso – Masculin Féminin
- Héctor Alterio – Todo sol es amargo
- Violeta Andrei – Golgota
- Pedro Armendáriz Jr. – Fuera de la ley
- Tina Aumont – Modesty Blaise
- Candice Bergen – The Group
- Peter Boyle – The Group
- Richard Bradford – The Chase
- Roberta Collins – Lord Love a Duck
- Michael Douglas – Cast a Giant Shadow
- Harrison Ford – Dead Heat on a Merry-Go-Round
- Ted Gehring – Swamp Country
- Julien Guiomar – King of Hearts
- Hal Holbrook – The Group
- Robert Ito – Women of the Prehistoric Planet
- Paulo José – The Priest and the Girl
- Stuart Margolin – Women of the Prehistoric Planet
- Bette Midler – Hawaii
- Helen Mirren – Press for Time
- Ian Ogilvy – The She Beast
- Alan Oppenheimer – Gammera the Invincible
- Robert Pine – Gunpoint
- Peter Renaday – Lt. Robin Crusoe, U.S.N.
- Maurice Roëves – The Fighting Prince of Donegal
- Hiroyuki Sanada – Game of Chance
- Patty Shepard – La ciudad no es para mí
- Lane Smith – Unholy Matrimony
- Anatoly Solonitsyn – Andrei Rublev
- Marco St. John – The Plastic Dome of Norma Jean
- James Tolkan – The Three Sisters
- Svetlana Toma – Red Meadows
- Natalya Varley – Formula radugi
- Sam Waterston – The Plastic Dome of Norma Jean
- Mary Woronov – The Beard
- Nicholas Worth – For Pete's Sake
- Louis Zorich – Gammera the Invincible
