= List of French films of 1966 =

A list of films produced in France in 1966.

Title	Director	Cast	Genre	Notes
Paris in August	Pierre Granier-Deferre	Charles Aznavour, Susan Hampshire, Etchika Choureau	Comedy	
A Bullet Through the Heart	Jean-Daniel Pollet	Sami Frey, Françoise Hardy, Tzeni Karezi	Crime	French-Greek co-production
Angelique and the King	Bernard Borderie	Michèle Mercier, Robert Hossein, Sami Frey	Adventure	French-West German-Italian co-production
Attack of the Robots	Jesús Franco	Eddie Constantine, Françoise Brion, Fernando Rey	Spy	French-Spanish co-production
Atout coeur à Tokyo pour OSS 117	Michel Boisrond	Frederick Stafford, Marina Vlady	Spy	French-Italian co-production
Au hasard Balthazar	Robert Bresson	Anne Wiazemsky, Walter Green, Pierre Klossowski	Drama	
Baraka sur X 13	Maurice Cloche	Gérard Barray, Sylva Koscina	Spy	French-Italian-Spanish co-production
Black Sun	Denys de La Patellière	Michèle Mercier, Daniel Gélin, Valentina Cortese	Crime	French-Italian co-production
The Boss of Champignol	Jean Bastia	Jean Richard, Michel Serrault, Martine Sarcey, Alfred Adam	Comedy	
Commissaire San Antonio	Guy Lefranc	Gérard Barray, Jean Richard	Crime	
Congress of Love	Géza von Radványi	Lilli Palmer, Curd Jürgens, Hannes Messemer	Historical comedy	Co-production with Austria and West Germany
The Diabolical Dr. Z	Jesús Franco	Estella Blain, Mabel Karr, Howard Vernon	Horror, Sci-Fi	French-Spanish co-production
Diamond Safari	Michel Drach	Marie-José Nat, Jean-Louis Trintignant, Horst Frank	Crime	French-West German co-production
Father's Trip	Denys de La Patellière	Fernandel, Lilli Palmer	Drama	French-Italian co-production
Four Queens for an Ace	Jacques Poitrenaud	Roger Hanin, Sylva Koscina, Catherine Allégret, Dominique Wilms, Laura Valenzuela	Spy	French-Italian-Spanish co-production
The Gardener of Argenteuil	Jean-Paul Le Chanois	Jean Gabin, Liselotte Pulver, Curd Jürgens	Comedy	Co-production with West Germany
Is Paris Burning?	René Clément	Jean-Paul Belmondo, Leslie Caron, Claude Rich	War	
King of Hearts	Philippe de Broca	Alan Bates, Geneviève Bujold, Jean-Claude Brialy	Comedy	French-Italian-British co-production
La Grande Vadrouille	Gérard Oury	Bourvil, Louis de Funès, Terry-Thomas	Comedy	French-British co-production
Le deuxième souffle	Jean-Pierre Melville	Lino Ventura, Paul Meurisse, Raymond Pellegrin	Crime	
Le Père Noël a les yeux bleus	Jean Eustache	Jean-Pierre Léaud, René Gilson	Drama	
Let's Not Get Angry	Georges Lautner	Lino Ventura, Jean Lefebvre, Mireille Darc and Michel Constantin.	Comedy crime	
Line of Demarcation	Claude Chabrol	Jean Seberg, Maurice Ronet, Stéphane Audran	War	
Living It Up	Pierre Gaspard-Huit	Mireille Darc, Jacques Charrier, Daniel Gélin	Drama	French-West German co-production
The Lonely Man Attacks	Ralph Habib	Roger Hanin, Jean Lefebvre	Spy	French-Spanish-Italian co-production
La Longue marche	Alexandre Astruc	Robert Hossein, Maurice Ronet, Jean-Louis Trintignant	War	
The Mad Dog	Eddy Matalon	Claude Brasseur, Dany Carrel	Crime	
Made in U.S.A.	Jean-Luc Godard	Anna Karina, Jean-Pierre Léaud, László Szabó	Crime	
Maigret and His Greatest Case	Alfred Weidenmann	Heinz Rühmann, Françoise Prévost, Günther Stoll	Crime	Co-production with Austria, West Germany and Italy
The Malabars Are in the Perfume	Guy Lefranc	Roger Pierre, Jean-Marc Thibault, Darry Cowl	Comedy	
A Man and a Woman	Claude Lelouch	Anouk Aimée, Jean-Louis Trintignant	Romance, drama	
Mademoiselle	Tony Richardson	Jeanne Moreau, Ettore Manni, Umberto Orsini	Drama	French-British co-production
Masculin, féminin	Jean-Luc Godard	Jean-Pierre Léaud, Chantal Goya	Drama	French-Swedish co-production
A Matter of Resistance	Jean-Paul Rappeneau	Catherine Deneuve, Pierre Brasseur, Philippe Noiret, Henri Garcin	Comedy drama romance war	
The Murder Clinic	Lionello De Felice	William Berger, Françoise Prévost, Mary Young	Horror	Italian-French co-production
Naked Hearts	Édouard Luntz	Gérard Zimmermann, Marise Maire, Eric Penet	Drama	
The Nun	Jacques Rivette	Anna Karina, Liselotte Pulver, Micheline Presle, Francine Bergé	Drama	
Objective 500 Million	Pierre Schoendoerffer	Bruno Cremer, Marisa Mell	Crime	French-Italian co-production
Paris in August	Pierre Granier-Deferre	Charles Aznavour, Susan Hampshire	Comedy	
The Saint Lies in Wait	Christian-Jaque	Jean Marais, Jess Hahn, Jean Yanne, Danièle Evenou, Raffaella Carrà	Spy	French-Italian co-production
The Second Twin	Christian-Jaque	Michèle Mercier, Robert Hossein, Pascale de Boysson	Crime	French-Italian co-production
The Thief	Jean Chapot	Romy Schneider, Michel Piccoli	Drama	French-West German co-production
Three Disordered Children	Léo Joannon	Bourvil, Jean Lefebvre	Comedy	
Trap for the Assassin	Riccardo Freda	Georges Géret, Irene Papas, Jean-Pierre Marielle	Crime	French-Italian co-production
Treasure of San Gennaro	Dino Risi	Nino Manfredi, Senta Berger, Mario Adorf	Comedy, crime	Italian-West German-French co-production
Triple Cross	Terence Young	Christopher Plummer, Yul Brynner, Romy Schneider	Spy	British-French-West-German co-production
Two Girls from the Red Star	Sammy Drechsel	Curd Jürgens, Lilli Palmer, Pascale Petit,	Comedy	Co-production with Austria and West Germany
Un monde nouveau	Vittorio De Sica	Christine Delaroche, Nino Castelnuovo, Madeleine Robinson	Drama	French-Italian co-production
The Upper Hand	Denys de La Patellière	Jean Gabin, George Raft, Nadja Tiller	Crime	
Young Törless	Volker Schlöndorff	Mathieu Carrière, Barbara Steele, Herbert Asmodi	Drama	West German-French co-production
Your Money or Your Life	Jean-Pierre Mocky	Fernandel, Heinz Rühmann, Jean Poiret	Comedy	French-Italian-West German co-production
The War Is Over	Alain Resnais	Yves Montand, Ingrid Thulin, Geneviève Bujold	Drama, War	French-Swedish co-production
Who Are You, Polly Maggoo?	William Klein	Dorothy McGowan, Jean Rochefort, Sami Frey	Comedy drama	
A Woman in White Revolts	Claude Autant-Lara	Bernard Dhéran, Michel Ruhl, Josée Steiner, Claude Titre, Danielle Volle	Drama	

== See also ==
- 1966 in France
