= A Midsummer Night's Dream (1969 film) =

Le songe d'une nuit d'été
- Directed by: Jean-Christophe Averty
- Based on: A Midsummer Night's Dream; 1600 play by William Shakespeare
- Starring: Claude Jade; Christine Delaroche; Jean-Claude Drouot; Christiane Minazzoli; Michel Ruhl; Dominique Serina; Marie Versini; Benoît Allemane; Henri Virlojeux; Michel Modo; Guy Grosso
- Cinematography: Claude Galland
- Music by: Jean-Claude Pelletier
- Release date: 25 December 1969 (France)
- Running time: 140 minutes
- Country: France
- Language: French

Le Songe d'une nuit d'été (A Midsummer Night's Dream) is a French TV film from 1969. It is based on A Midsummer Night's Dream by William Shakespeare, and was directed by Jean-Christophe Averty.

== Action ==
The four lovers Hermia (Christine Delaroche), Helena (Claude Jade), Lysander (Michel Ruhl), and Demetrius (Dominique Serina) have fled to a forest near Athens to escape from their parents' marriage plans. The situation is bad, because Helena's beloved Demetrius is in love with Hermia. Since Helena wants to win over Demetrius, she reveals the escape plan. The four wander through the thicket in the kingdom of the elves. The elf couple Oberon (Jean-Claude Drouot) and Titania (Christiane Minazzoli) are arguing furiously there. Hoping to solve the lovers' romantic problems, the spirit Puck drops a magical potion into the eyes of the young man he believes to be Demetrius. The potion's effect makes the man fall in love with the first being he sees upon awaking. But Puck is mistaken: the sleeping man was Lysander. Now both Lysander and Demetrius are competing for the same woman, Hermia, who nobody previously loved. Hermia's jealousy is reawakened. Standing between the envious Hermia and her amorous suitors, Helena begins to despair. While the young people argue, a troupe of craftsmen become lost in the woods. The magical potion is applied to the sleeping Titania in order to play a trick on her: she falls in love with Bottom, one of the lost troupe, who has been magically given a donkey's head. Oberon ends the general confusion by sending the quartet of Athenian lovers to sleep again ...

== Background ==
Le Songe d'une nuit d'été is an early work of video art. Director Jean-Christophe Averty, who was at the time the most successful TV director in France, had his actors, who were mostly internationally known movie stars like Claude Jade, Christine Delaroche, Jean-Claude Drouot and Marie Versini, perform in front of a blue screen. The Athenian forest and the palace are conjured up by a mixture of frescoes and psychedelic colours. At the same time, the relative sizes of the actors are changed, so that for example they can walk in front of a closeup of their partner, or appear to walk out of paintings on vases. Averty exploited all of the technical tricks that were available at the time.

The troupe of craftsmen includes the comedy duo Michel Modo and Guy Grosso, who are best known as Berlicot and Tricart from The Troops of St. Tropez-films with Louis de Funès.

== Critical reception ==
Maurice Clavel from the Nouvel Observateur celebrated the work as a perfectly harmonious and aesthetic piece, and compared the ecstasy of images with a galaxy. He counted the fast-paced performance of the actress Claude Jade as Helena as another miracle of the movie. Le Monde called the TV movie a "masterpiece", and France Soir called it an epoch-making date and a revolution in the history of direction. Responding to the premiere on German TV, a critic at WDR remarked: "Rather than being accused of having too few ideas, Averty has created a colourful phantasmagoria against which categories like arts, crafts, or kitsch fail."

== Cast ==
- Claude Jade: Helena
- Christine Delaroche: Hermia
- Jean-Claude Drouot: Oberon
- Christiane Minazzoli: Titania
- Michel Ruhl: Lysander
- Dominique Serina: Demetrius
- Marie Versini: Hippolita
- Benoît Allemane: Theseus
- Henri Virlojeux: Egeus
- Michel Tureau: Puck
- Jacques Ferrière: Bottom
- Michel Modo: Flute
- Guy Grosso: Quinze
