= Marie Versini =

French actress (1940–2021)

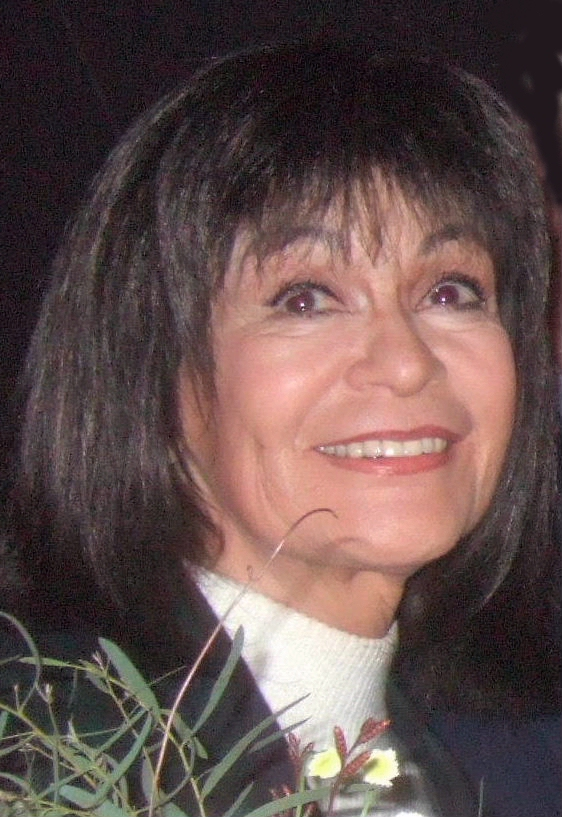
- Versini in 2010
- Born: 10 August 1940; Paris, France
- Died: 22 November 2021 (aged 81); Guingamp, France
- Occupation: Actress
- Years active: 1958–2019

Marie Versini (10 August 1940 — 22 November 2021) was a French film and television actress.

== Career ==
Versini appeared in several international cinema productions. After playing in Karl May film adaptations she received a number of German popularity awards.

She died on 22 November 2021 in Guingamp, Brittany.

== Selected filmography ==
Year	Title	Role	Director
1958	A Tale of Two Cities	Marie Gabelle	Ralph Thomas
1960	Jack of Spades	Zita	Yves Allégret
1960	Il peccato degli anni verdi	Elena Giordani	Leopoldo Trieste
1961	Paris Blues	Nicole	Martin Ritt
1962	Black-White-Red Four Poster	Gertrude Forrestier	Rolf Thiele
1963	The Young Racers	Sesia Machin	Roger Corman
1963	Apache Gold	Nscho-tschi, Winnetou's sister	Harald Reinl
1964	The River Line	Marie	Rudolf Jugert
1964	The Shoot	Tschita	Robert Siodmak
1965	Halløj i himmelsengen	Zizi	Erik Balling
1965	A Holiday with Piroschka	Tery	Franz Josef Gottlieb
1965	Wild Kurdistan	Ingdscha	Franz Josef Gottlieb
1965	Kingdom of the Silver Lion	Ingdscha	Franz Josef Gottlieb
1966	The Brides of Fu Manchu	Marie Lentz	Don Sharp
1966	Is Paris Burning?	Claire Morandat	René Clément
1967	Love Nights in the Taiga	Ludmilla Barankova	Harald Philipp
1969	A Midsummer Night's Dream	Hippolyte	Jean-Christophe Averty
1973	Inferno	Mlle. Lecain	Stanislav Barabas

== Awards ==
Year	Group	Award
1965	Otto	Gold
1966	Otto	Gold
1967	Bambi	Silver
1967	Otto	Gold
1968	Otto	Gold
1969	Otto	Silver
1970	Otto	Bronze
