= List of Spanish films of 1966 =

A list of films produced in Spain in 1966 (see 1966 in film).

== 1966 ==
Title	Director	Cast	Genre	Notes
1966
Attack of the Robots	Jesús Franco	Eddie Constantine, Françoise Brion, Fernando Rey	Spy	Spanish-French co-production
La caza	Carlos Saura	Alfredo Mayo, Emilio Gutiérrez Caba, Ismael Merlo	Drama	Won Best Director at Berlin
La Dama del Alba	Francisco Rovira Beleta	Dolores del Río, Yuliette Villar		
The Diabolical Dr. Z	Jesús Franco	Estella Blain, Mabel Karr, Howard Vernon		French-Spanish co-production
Kriminal	Umberto Lenzi	Roel Bos, Helga Liné, Andrea Bosic		Italian-Spanish co-production
Man on the Spying Trapeze	Juan de Orduña	Wayde Preston, Helga Sommerfeld, Reinhard Kolldehoff	Spy	Co-production with Italy and West Germany
Nueve cartas a Berta	Basilio Martín Patino	Emilio Gutiérrez Caba	Drama	Influenced by Nouvelle Vague and 60's new cinemas
Noche de vino tinto	José María Nunes			Escuela de Barcelona
With the Est Wind	Mario Camus			Entered into the 1966 Cannes Film Festival
The Texican	Lesley Selander	Audie Murphy	Western	
Who Killed Johnny R.?	José Luis Madrid	Lex Barker, Joachim Fuchsberger, Marianne Koch	Western	Co-production with West Germany
