= Drouot =

Drouot (English: /druːoʊ/, French: [dʁuo]) may refer to:

- Antoine Drouot (1774–1847), French general
- Jean-Claude Drouot (born 1938), Belgian actor
- Hôtel Drouot, Paris auction house
- Richelieu–Drouot station, a Paris Metro station
- Drouot, an inner-city (cité ouvrière) in Mulhouse, Haut-Rhin, France
