= Jean-Christophe Averty =

French television and radio director (1928–2017)

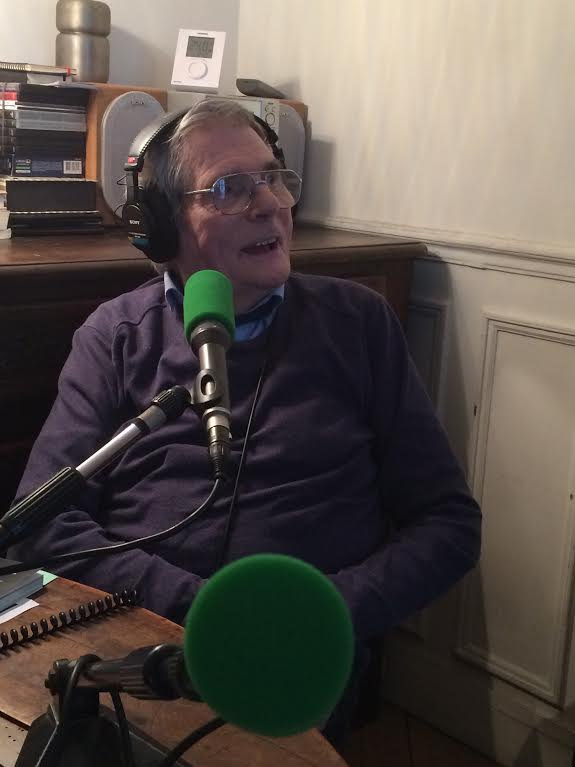
- Averty in 2015
- Born: 6 August 1928; Paris, France
- Died: 4 March 2017 (aged 88)
- Education: IDHEC film school
- Occupation: TV/Radio director

Jean-Christophe Averty (French pronunciation: [ʒɑ̃ kʁistɔf avɛʁti]; 6 August 1928 – 4 March 2017) was a French television and radio director, and Satrap of the College of 'Pataphysique.

Many of his television productions from the 1960s were early examples of French video art. His studies were used in the following decades by the research groups of France's Institut national de l'audiovisuel (INA).

== Biography ==
Averty was born in Paris. A graduate of the IDHEC film school, he started in television in 1952 at the then French Television Office. He directed over five hundred programs for television and radio, across all disciplines: fiction, documentary, drama, variety, and jazz. His many awards include an Emmy award in the United States.

Averty was appointed Satrap of the College of 'Pataphysique in 1990, due to his fascination for Alfred Jarry and Pataphysique.

Averty made his reputation on his strong character, his taste for provocation and his sense for innovative television. His 1963 series The Green Grapes was infamous for a recurring sequence of a baby being put through a grater.

A keen connoisseur of jazz, Averty filmed the Jazz à Juan festival for many years. The pianist Martial Solal paid him a tribute in one of his compositions: Averty, c'est moi (Averty that's me).

Over 28 years, he hosted 1,805 episodes of his radio show Les Cinglés du music-hall, based on his own collection of jazz and variety 78s that he had bought in flea markets around the world. The show was cancelled in 2006 under Jean-Paul Cluzel's chairmanship of Radio France. The French section of the shows was based on notebooks entrusted to him by André Cauzard, filled with daily details of pre-war jazz music events.

Averty directed television shows where he applied his singular style to showcase the greatest francophone singers such as Françoise Hardy, Yves Montand, Johnny Hallyday, Sylvie Vartan, Juliette Gréco, Georges Brassens, Dalida, France Gall, Serge Gainsbourg, Gilbert Bécaud, Guy Marchand, Léo Ferré, Tino Rossi, and Jean Sablon, and as well as foreign musicians such as Patty Pravo.

In 1969 Averty directed the TV movie Le Songe d'une nuit d'été, starring Claude Jade, Christine Delaroche and Jean-Claude Drouot, and filmed entirely in bluescreen.

His television creations are landmarks in their use of video as a mode of artistic expression. Averty made great use of characters filmed against a blue screen, overlaid on a drawn background. Examples are Sapeur Camembert, based on the eponymous work of Georges Colomb, and a production of Edmond Rostand's classic play Chantecler.

Averty was one of the last salaried directors of the Société française de production (SFP).

In 2012, he entrusted the management, conservation and safeguarding of the rights of all of his television and radio works to the Institut national de l'audiovisuel (INA); nearly a thousand television programs on jazz, sports, fashion, variety and the theater.

== Awards and distinctions ==
- 1965 Emmy Award
- 1991 Legion of Honour
