= Wild Kurdistan =

1965 film

- Directed by: Franz Josef Gottlieb
- Written by: Franz Josef Gottlieb
- Based on: Durchs wilde Kurdistan by Karl May
- Produced by: Artur Brauner; Eberhard Meichsner
- Starring: Lex Barker; Marie Versini; Ralf Wolter
- Cinematography: Francisco Marín; Robert Ziller
- Edited by: Walter Wischniewsky
- Music by: Raimund Rosenberger
- Production companies: CCC Film; Balcázar Producciones Cinematográficas
- Distributed by: Gloria Film
- Release date: 28 September 1965
- Running time: 95 minutes
- Countries: Spain; West Germany
- Language: German

Wild Kurdistan (German: Durchs wilde Kurdistan) is a 1965 Spanish-West German adventure film directed by Franz Josef Gottlieb and starring Lex Barker, Marie Versini and Ralf Wolter. It was shot at the Spandau Studios in West Berlin and on location in Andalusia. The film's sets were designed by the art directors Hans Jürgen Kiebach and Ernst Schomer. It is an adaptation of the 1892 novel of the same tile by Karl May. It was followed by the sequel Kingdom of the Silver Lion.

== Cast ==
- Lex Barker as Kara Ben Nemsi
- Marie Versini as Ingdscha
- Ralf Wolter as Hadschi Halef Omar
- Djordje Nenadovic as Machredsch of Mosul
- Gustavo Rojo as Ahmed El Corda
- Werner Peters as Mütesselin
- Charles Fawcett as Scheik Mohammed Emin/Scheik Kadir Bei
- Wolfgang Lukschy as Ali Bei
- Gloria Cámara as Benda
- Fernando Sancho as Padischah
- José Nieto as Pir Kamek
- Antonio Casas as Scheik Cedar
- Maite Matalonga as Hanneh
- Dieter Borsche as Sir David Lindsay
- Chris Howland as Archibald
- Antonio Iranzo as Durek
- Milo Quesada as Miralai
- Tito García as Sergeant
- Kurt Waitzmann as Ingdscha's brother

== Bibliography ==
- Bergfelder, Tim. International Adventures: German Popular Cinema and European Co-Productions in the 1960s. Berghahn Books, 2005.
- Goble, Alan. The Complete Index to Literary Sources in Film. Walter de Gruyter, 1999.
