= Il peccato degli anni verdi =

- Directed by: Leopoldo Trieste
- Written by: Leopoldo Trieste
- Starring: Marie Versini; Maurice Ronet; Alida Valli; Ann Smyrner; Corrado Pani; Sergio Fantoni
- Cinematography: Armando Nannuzzi
- Music by: Igino Negri
- Release date: 1960
- Country: Italy
- Language: Italian

Il peccato degli anni verdi (Italian for "The sin of the green years") is a 1960 Italian romance film written and directed by Leopoldo Trieste. It premiered at the Locarno International Film Festival with the title L'assegno.

== Plot ==
Released from a boarding school of nuns in Como, the seventeen-year-old Milanese Elena Giordani manages to convince her parents to let her spend the summer holidays together with her Genoese friend Diana D'Aquino in her villa in Rapallo.

Diana takes advantage of Elena's presence to distract the young Milanese industrialist, Paolo Donati, who is trying to woo his mother. After a couple of meetings organized by Diana, Paolo invites Elena for a trip on his yacht.

After a walk in Portofino, where they meet Martina, a Dutch tourist, the inexperienced Elena is fascinated by Paolo and in a short time falls in love with him. Thinking about starting a great love story, she lets herself be seduced and becomes pregnant.

Back in Milan, Elena realizes that Paolo has become detached and considers theirs only a summer adventure now over. Even after learning about the pregnancy, Paolo remains cold and even suggests that Elena have an abortion.

For this reason, more by impulse than by conviction, Elena decides to ask him for money, to avoid reporting him for having seduced a minor. Paolo accepts and gives her a check that Elena will never cash.

The parents try to convince the two boys to get back together to give the unborn child a family. But Paolo has started a new story with Martina, the Dutch tourist he met on vacation, and Elena has understood that she cannot marry a man only out of necessity, as her mother had done years ago by accepting a marriage of interest.

So Elena decides to give birth alone and raise the baby with the help of her mother.

== Cast ==
- Marie Versini: Elena Giordani
- Maurice Ronet: Paolo Donati
- Alida Valli: Elena's mother
- Corrado Pani: Augusto
- Ann Smyrner: Martina
- Sergio Fantoni: Giulia Giordani's husband
- Otello Toso: Elena's father
- Evi Maltagliati: Paolo Donati's mother
- Maria Grazia Spina: Giulia Giordani
- Rosy Martin: Diana D'Aquino
- Raffaella Carrà: Diana's friend
