= A Holiday with Piroschka =

1965 film

- Scene from a film
- German: Ferien mit Piroschka
- Directed by: Franz Josef Gottlieb
- Written by: Ferenc Földessy; Kurt Nachmann
- Produced by: Richard Deutsch; József Gyõrffy
- Starring: Marie Versini; Götz George; Dietmar Schönherr
- Cinematography: Richard Angst
- Edited by: Annemarie Reisetbauer
- Music by: Peter Fényes
- Release date: 31 December 1965
- Running time: 95 minutes
- Countries: Austria; Hungary; West Germany
- Language: German

A Holiday with Piroschka (German: Ferien mit Piroschka) is a 1965 comedy film directed by Franz Josef Gottlieb and starring Marie Versini, Götz George, and Dietmar Schönherr. It was a co-production between Austria, Hungary and West Germany. Despite their similar names, the film has little in common with the 1955 I Often Think of Piroschka.

== Cast ==
- Marie Versini as Tery
- Götz George as Thomas Laurends
- Dietmar Schönherr as Alfi Trattenbach
- Gisela Uhlen as Mrs. Laurends
- Liselotte Bav as Ilona
- István Bujtor
- Hilda Gobbi as Katalin
- János Görbe as Pali-Bacsi
- Teri Tordai as Karin
