= Le Bonheur (1965 film) =

1965 French film by Agnès Varda

- Theatrical release poster
- Directed by: Agnès Varda
- Written by: Agnès Varda
- Produced by: Mag Bodard
- Starring: Jean-Claude Drouot; Claire Drouot; Marie-France Boyer
- Cinematography: Claude Beausoleil; Jean Rabier
- Edited by: Janine Verneau
- Music by: Wolfgang Amadeus Mozart
- Production company: Parc Film
- Distributed by: Columbia
- Release date: 2 January 1965
- Running time: 80 minutes
- Country: France
- Language: French

Le Bonheur ("Happiness") is a 1965 French drama film directed by Agnès Varda. It is associated with the French New Wave, and won two awards at the 15th Berlin International Film Festival, including the Jury Grand Prix.

== Plot ==
François, a handsome young joiner working for his uncle, lives a comfortable and happy life in the Parisian suburb of Fontenay-aux-Roses with his pretty wife, Thérèse, who is a dressmaker, and their two young children, Gisou and Pierrot. The family loves going on outings to the woods outside town. Although deeply happy with his life and devoted to his wife and children, one summer François falls for Émilie, an attractive single woman who works at the post office, has a flat of her own, and closely resembles Thérèse.

During a picnic in the woods, after putting the children down for a nap, Thérèse asks François why he has seemed particularly happy lately. He explains that his love for her and the children remains unchanged, but has been enhanced by the new happiness he has found with Émilie over the past month. Initially confused and upset, Thérèse soon claims to accept this, and they have sex. François falls asleep, but, upon waking, finds Thérèse gone. Desperately searching, he discovers her drowned body, which anglers have retrieved from a small nearby lake.

After Thérèse's funeral, François, his children, his brother's family, and his uncle and aunt go to the Loire for an extended vacation. When they return, François seeks out Émilie, and, before long, she moves into his house and begins to look after him and the children, taking over all of the tasks formerly performed by Thérèse. By fall, François once again has a happy family, and continues to enjoy outings to the woods.

== Cast ==
- Jean-Claude Drouot as François Chevalier
- Claire Drouot as Thérèse Chevalier
- Sandrine Drouot as Gisou Chevalier, François and Thérèse's daughter
- Olivier Drouot as Pierrot Chevalier, François and Thérèse's son
- Marie-France Boyer as Émilie Savignac
- Marcelle Favre-Bertin
- Manon Lanclos as Mme Mesquier
- Sylvia Saurel as Yvette Mercier, the bride
- Marc Eyraud as Joseph Chevalier, François' uncle and boss
- Christian Riehl
- Paul Vecchiali as Paul Chevalier, François' brother

François' wife and children are played by Jean-Claude Drouot's actual wife and children, in their only film appearances.

== Reception ==
At a 2019 tribute to Agnès Varda, Sheila Heti, AS Hamrah, and Jenny Chamarette included Le Bonheur among their favourite of Varda's films, with Charmarette claiming it as her favourite, and describing it as "like nothing else: a horror movie wrapped up in sunflowers, an excoriating feminist diatribe strummed to the tune of a love ballad. It’s one of the most terrifying films I’ve ever seen." Hamrah called Le Bonheur "Varda’s most shocking movie," adding: "it’s deeply subversive and works like a horror film...How many films are truly shocking the way Le Bonheur is? I don’t think there are any others." Heti stated: "I don’t have a favourite, but the one I think about most often is probably Le Bonheur because it had such a devastating ending. It is perhaps the most straightforward in terms of story-telling, yet truly radical – emotionally radical, come the end...It’s impossible to stop thinking about this ending and what it says about love, life, chaos, and fate."

On review aggregator website Rotten Tomatoes, the film holds an approval rating of 88% based on 8 reviews, with an average rating of 9.0/10.
