= Donkey Skin (film) =

1970 film by Jacques Demy

- Theatrical release poster
- French: Peau d'Âne
- Directed by: Jacques Demy
- Screenplay by: Jacques Demy
- Based on: Donkeyskin; 1695 fairy tale by Charles Perrault
- Produced by: Mag Bodard
- Starring: Catherine Deneuve; Jean Marais; Jacques Perrin; Micheline Presle; Delphine Seyrig
- Cinematography: Ghislain Cloquet
- Edited by: Anne-Marie Cotret
- Music by: Michel Legrand
- Production companies: Parc Film; Marianne Productions
- Distributed by: Cinema International Corporation
- Release date: 20 December 1970 (France)
- Running time: 90 minutes
- Country: France
- Language: French
- Box office: $13.2 million

Donkey Skin (French: Peau d'Âne; also known in English as Once Upon a Time and The Magic Donkey) is a 1970 French surrealist fantasy musical romantic comedy film directed by Jacques Demy, based on Donkeyskin, a 1695 fairy tale by Charles Perrault about a king who wishes to marry his own daughter. It stars Catherine Deneuve, Jacques Perrin and Jean Marais, with music by Michel Legrand. Donkey Skin proved to be Demy's biggest success in France, with a total of 2,198,576 tickets sold.

Donkey Skin is distributed on DVD in North America by Koch-Lorber Films. It is also available in Blu-ray format as part of Criterion's The Essential Jacques Demy collection.

In France, the film is considered a cult classic.

== Plot ==
The king promises his dying queen that after her death he will only marry a woman as beautiful and virtuous as she. Pressed by his advisers to remarry and produce an heir, he comes to the conclusion that the only way to fulfill his promise is to marry his own daughter, the princess. Following the advice of her godmother, the lilac fairy, the princess demands a series of seemingly impossible nuptial gifts in the hope that her father will be forced to give up his plans of marriage. However, the king succeeds in providing her with dresses the colour of the weather, the moon and the sun and finally with the skin of a magic donkey that excretes jewels, the source of his kingdom's wealth. Donning the donkey skin, the princess flees her father's kingdom to avoid the incestuous marriage.

In the guise of "Donkey Skin", the princess finds employment as a pig keeper in a neighbouring kingdom. The prince of this kingdom spies her in her hut in the woods and falls in love with her. Love-struck, he retires to his sickbed, and asks that Donkey Skin be instructed to bake him a cake to restore him to health. In the cake, he finds a ring that the princess has placed there, and is thus sure that his love for her is reciprocated. He declares that he will marry the woman whose finger fits the ring.

All the women of marriageable age assemble at the prince's castle and try on the ring one by one, in order of social status. Last of all is the lowly Donkey Skin, who is revealed to be the princess when the ring fits her finger. At the wedding of the prince and the princess, the lilac fairy and the king arrive by helicopter and declare that they too are to be married.

== Cast ==
- Catherine Deneuve as the Blue Queen, the Princess/Donkey Skin
  - Anne Germain as the Princess/Donkey Skin (singing voice)
- Jean Marais as the Blue King
- Jacques Perrin as the Prince
  - Jacques Revaux as the Prince (singing voice)
- Micheline Presle as the Red Queen
- Delphine Seyrig as the Lilac Fairy
  - Christiane Legrand as the Lilac Fairy (singing voice)
- Fernand Ledoux as the Red King
- Henri Crémieux as the Doctor
- Sacha Pitoëff as the Prime Minister
- Pierre Repp as Thibaud
- Jean Servais as Narrator
- Georges Adet as the Scholar
- Annick Berger as Nicolette
- Romain Bouteille as the Charlatan
- Louise Chevalier as the Old Woman
- Sylvain Corthay as Godefroy
- Jacques Demy and Michel Legrand as voices
- Rufus

== Production ==
Jacques Demy, fascinated by Charles Perrault's fairy tale since childhood, was working on a script for the film as early as 1962. The involvement of Catherine Deneuve was instrumental in securing financing for the production.

Numerous elements in the film refer to Jean Cocteau's 1946 fairy-tale film Beauty and the Beast: the casting of Jean Marais, the use of live actors to portray human statues in the castles and the use of simple special effects such as slow motion and reverse motion.

Shooting locations for the film included:

- Château de Chambord
- Château de Pierrefonds
- Château du Plessis-Bourré
- Senlis

== Reception ==
The film sold 2,882,018 tickets in France, making it the ninth-most popular film of 1970.
