= Kingdom of the Silver Lion =

1965 film

- Directed by: Franz Josef Gottlieb
- Written by: Franz Josef Gottlieb; José Antonio de la Loma
- Based on: Im Reich des silbernen Löwen by Karl May
- Produced by: Artur Brauner; Eberhard Meichsner
- Starring: Lex Barker; Marie Versini; Ralf Wolter
- Cinematography: Francisco Marín; Robert Ziller
- Edited by: Walter Wischniewsky
- Music by: Raimund Rosenberger
- Production companies: CCC Film; Balcázar Producciones Cinematográficas
- Distributed by: Gloria Film
- Release date: 31 December 1965
- Running time: 95 minutes
- Countries: Spain; West Germany
- Language: German

Kingdom of the Silver Lion (German: Im Reich des silbernen Löwen) is a 1965 Spanish-West German adventure film directed by Franz Josef Gottlieb and starring Lex Barker, Marie Versini and Ralf Wolter. It was shot at the Spandau Studios in West Berlin and on location in Spain. The film's sets were designed by the art directors Hans Jürgen Kiebach and Ernst Schomer. It was based on the novel of the same title by Karl May. It is the sequel to the film Wild Kurdistan, released earlier the same year.

== Cast ==
- Lex Barker as Kara Ben Nemsi
- Marie Versini as Ingdscha
- Ralf Wolter as Hadschi Halef Omar
- Sieghardt Rupp as Abu Seif
- Djordje Nenadovic as Machredsch of Mosul
- Gustavo Rojo as Ahmed El Corda
- Anne-Marie Blanc as Marah Durimeh
- Charles Fawcett as Scheik Mohammed Emin/Scheik Kadir Bei
- Gloria Cámara as Benda
- Fernando Sancho as Padischah
- Antonio Casas as Scheik Cedar
- Dieter Borsche as Sir David Lindsay
- Chris Howland as Archibald
- Antonio Iranzo as Durek

== Bibliography ==
- Bergfelder, Tim. International Adventures: German Popular Cinema and European Co-Productions in the 1960s. Berghahn Books, 2005.
- Goble, Alan. The Complete Index to Literary Sources in Film. Walter de Gruyter, 1999.
