= Mag Bodard =

Italian-born French film producer (1916–2019)

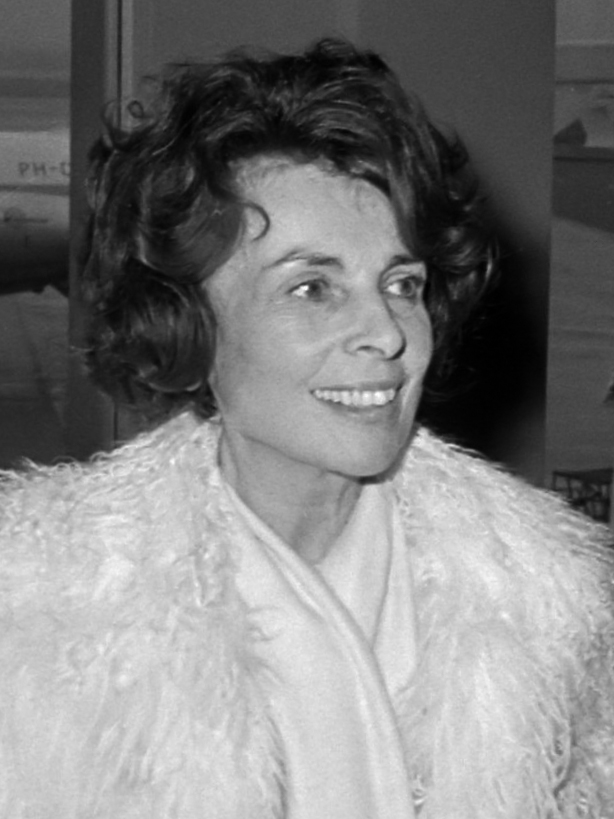
Bodard in 1972

Mag Bodard (3 January 1916 – 26 February 2019) was an Italian-born French film producer, known for The Umbrellas of Cherbourg, Donkey Skin, and The Young Girls of Rochefort.

== Life ==
Bodard was born in Turin as Margherita Maria Renata Perato. She worked as a journalist for women's magazine Elle before going into film producing. In 1962, she married the reporter Lucien Bodard, whom she had met in southeast Asia, and the two subsequently moved to Paris. Through his contacts she became an editor for the newspaper France-Soir, where she began an affair with its owner Pierre Lazareff.

Bodard's first film was The Dance (1962). Two years later, she produced the musical The Umbrellas of Cherbourg, which won the Palm d'Or at the Cannes Film Festival. The film was also nominated for five Academy Awards, a Golden Globe, and a Grammy.

Bodard would go on to produce several dozen more films and worked with renowned directors such as Agnès Varda on Le Bonheur, Jean-Luc Godard on 2 or 3 Things I Know About Her and La Chinoise, Robert Bresson on Au hasard Balthazar and A Gentle Woman, and Alain Resnais on Je t'aime, je t'aime. She promoted the careers of directors such as Maurice Pialat, Nina Companeez, and Claude Miller.

She opened her own production company Parc Films, which ran from 1963 to 1972, and was supported by Lazareff. The company was dissolved after Lazareff died.

In 1977, she shifted from cinema to television. She produced her last television film, Inconnue de la départementale, in 2006 at the age of ninety.

In 2005, a documentary about her life, Mag Bodard, un destin, was directed by Anne Wiazemsky. She celebrated her hundredth birthday in 2016. She died in Neuilly-sur-Seine at the age of 103.

== Selected filmography ==
- 1962: The Dance
- 1964: The Umbrellas of Cherbourg
- 1965: Happiness
- 1966: Au hasard Balthazar
- 1967: Two or Three Things I Know About Her
- 1967: The Young Girls of Rochefort
- 1967: La Chinoise
- 1968: Benjamin
- 1968: Je t'aime, je t'aime
- 1969: A Gentle Woman
- 1970: La maison des Bories
- 1970: Donkey Skin
- 1979: Les Dames de la côte (TV miniseries)
- 1989: La Grande Cabriole (TV miniseries)
- 2006: Inconnue de la départementale
