= List of Spanish films of the 1960s =

Films produced in Spain in the 1960s ordered by year of release on separate pages:

== List of films by year ==
- Spanish films of 1960
- Spanish films of 1961
- Spanish films of 1962
- Spanish films of 1963
- Spanish films of 1964
- Spanish films of 1965
- Spanish films of 1966
- Spanish films of 1967
- Spanish films of 1968
- Spanish films of 1969
