= And Satan Calls the Turns =

1962 film

- Directed by: Grisha Dabat
- Screenplay by: Grisha Dabat; Roger Vadim
- Produced by: Claude V. Coen; Roger Vadim
- Starring: Catherine Deneuve; Jacques Perrin
- Cinematography: Raoul Coutard
- Music by: Claude Vasori
- Release date: 1962
- Language: French

And Satan Calls the Turns is a 1962 French film directed by Grisha Dabat and starring Catherine Deneuve.

It was known in France as Et Satan conduit le bal.

== Cast ==
- Catherine Deneuve as Manuelle
- Jacques Perrin as Ivan
- Bernadette Lafont as Isabelle
- Jacques Doniol-Valcroze as Éric
- Françoise Brion as Monica
- Henri-Jacques Huet as Jean-Claude
- Jacques Monod as Monsieur Klaus
