= L'Avare (film) =

- French theatrical release poster
- Directed by: Louis de Funès; Jean Girault
- Written by: Louis de Funès; Jean Girault
- Based on: L'Avare by Molière
- Produced by: Christian Fechner; Bernard Artigues
- Starring: Louis de Funès
- Cinematography: Edmond Richard
- Edited by: Michel Lewin
- Music by: Jean Bizet
- Distributed by: AMLF
- Release date: 5 March 1980
- Running time: 125 minutes
- Country: France
- Language: French
- Box office: $18.3 million

L'Avare is a 1980 French comedy film written and directed by Louis de Funès and Jean Girault, and starring de Funès. The English title of the film is The Miser. It is an adaptation of Molière's famous comedy L'Avare (The Miser).

De Funès tried to draw out the unhappy side of the character. Harpagon, unloved by humanity, is driven to an obsessive love of money.

== Plot ==
The film takes place in 17th-century Paris and closely follows the plot of Molière's classic comedy. Harpagon is a wealthy, tyrannical, and pathologically miserly widower who loves nothing more than his hidden casket containing 10,000 gold coins, which he has buried in his garden. His extreme greed makes life miserable for his two children, Cléante and Élise, as well as his household servants.

Harpagon plans to secure wealthy, arranged marriages for his children that will cost him nothing. He intends to marry Élise to the elderly, wealthy Signor Anselme solely because Anselme agrees to take her without a dowry. Meanwhile, Harpagon plans to marry a young, impoverished woman named Mariane for himself. He is entirely unaware that Élise is secretly in love with Valère—who has taken a job as Harpagon's house steward just to be close to her—and that Cléante is deeply in love with Mariane.

Desperate for financial independence to marry Mariane, Cléante tries to secure a loan through an intermediary, only to discover that the usurious, predatory lender is his own father. Tensions escalate during a dinner hosted by Harpagon, who forces his guests and servants to endure ridiculous restrictions to save money.

The climax is triggered when Cléante’s clever servant, La Flèche, discovers and steals Harpagon's buried gold casket. Distraught and driven to near-madness by the loss of his money, Harpagon summons a police magistrate and suspects everyone in the city of the theft. In a bid for revenge, the disgruntled cook and coachman, Maître Jacques, falsely accuses Valère of stealing the treasure. When confronted, Valère misunderstands the accusation, thinking Harpagon has discovered his secret love for Élise, and confesses his devotion to her instead.

The situation is resolved with the arrival of Signor Anselme. It is miraculously revealed that Valère and Mariane are long-lost siblings, and Anselme is their wealthy father, who survived a historic shipwreck years ago. Anselme agrees to pay for both weddings (Cléante to Mariane, and Valère to Élise) and covers all expenses, including the cost of the police investigation. Cléante returns the stolen casket to his father. Ultimately, everyone is happily united, while Harpagon is left perfectly content, remaining alone with his beloved gold.

== Cast ==
- Louis de Funès: Harpagon
- Franck Cabot-David: Cléante
- Hervé Bellon: Valère
- Michel Galabru: Maître Jacques
- Georges Audoubert: Anselme
- Claude Gensac: Frosine
- Claire Dupray: Élise, Miser's daughter
- Anne Caudry: Marianne, Cléante's girlfriend
- Bernard Menez: La Flèche, Cléante's valet
- Henri Génès: the commissioner
- Michel Modo: la Merluche, Harpagon's attendant
- Guy Grosso: Brindavoine, Harpagon's attendant
- Max Montavon: Maître Simon
- Micheline Bourday: Dame Claude, the housemaid
- Madeleine Barbulée: Marianne's mother

== Reception ==
The film is rated 70% Fresh by Rotten Tomatoes.
