= The Defector (film) =

- French theatrical release poster
- Directed by: Raoul Lévy
- Written by: Raoul Lévy; Robert Guenette; Montgomery Clift (Note: Uncredited.); Peter Francke
- Based on: 1965 novel The Spy by Paul Thomas
- Produced by: Raoul Lévy; Conrad von Molo
- Starring: Montgomery Clift; Hardy Krüger; Macha Méril
- Cinematography: Raoul Coutard
- Edited by: Roger Dwyre; Albert Jurgenson
- Music by: Serge Gainsbourg
- Production company: Seven Arts Productions
- Distributed by: Gaumont Distribution (France)
- Release date: 20 October 1966 (West Germany)
- Running time: 106 minutes
- Countries: France; West Germany
- Language: English
- Budget: $1.5 million

The Defector is a 1966 thriller film starring Montgomery Clift, Hardy Krüger, Roddy McDowall and Macha Méril. It was directed and co-written by Belgian director/producer Raoul Lévy and based on the 1965 novel L'espion (The Spy) by Paul Thomas.

This was Clift's final film, and he only agreed to the part so that he could prepare himself for his next role in the 1967 film Reflections in a Golden Eye (the role went to Marlon Brando). Although obviously very ill (he died less than three months after most of the shooting was completed), Clift still managed to give a convincing performance in what has been termed a very moody and somber film. This characterization is in stark contrast to the exuberance displayed by his love interest, who was played by Méril, an obviously more youthful woman.

Lévy committed suicide on December 31, 1966, less than two months after the film's American release.

== Plot ==
American physicist Professor Bower is effectively blackmailed by a shady CIA agent named Adams to help the CIA obtain secret microfilm from a defecting Russian scientist. The reluctant Bower travels to East Germany undercover as an antiques collector, where he encounters Heinzmann, an East German fellow physicist who is also a secret agent. Heinzmann is aware of Bower's meeting with Adams and of his intention to steal the microfilm, but their mutual respect for one another's tactics complicate the proceedings.

== Cast ==
- Montgomery Clift as Prof. James Bower
- Hardy Krüger as Counselor Peter Heinzmann
- Macha Méril as Frieda Hoffman
- Roddy McDowall as Agent Adams
- David Opatoshu as Orlovsky
- Christine Delaroche as Ingrid
- Hannes Messemer as Dr. Saltzer
- Karl Lieffen as The Major

== Production ==
Plans for the film, based on the novel The Spy, were announced in January 1966. It was Montgomery Clift's first film appearance in four years. The original stars announced were Clift, Monica Vitti and Hardy Krüger. Filming was to begin on January 29, 1966 in Munich at the Regina Hotel and at the Bavaria Atellier Gestellschaft Studio on a budget of $1.5 million. Levy had previously made Hail Mafia with Seven Arts.

Filming was pushed back until March, meaning that Vitti had to drop out, and she was replaced by Leslie Caron. Then Caron gave up her role shortly before filming began in Munich in March 1966. Nicole Courcel also left the cast and was replaced by Macha Méril. Filming proceeded relatively smoothly in sharp contrast to other later-period Clift films.

Filming was completed in June 1966. Clift returned to New York, where he died the following month.

== Reception ==
=== Critics' response ===
Critics were generally favorable to the film. Bosley Crowther of the New York Times said, "Mr. Clift is apt in this his last film — lonely, bewildered, courageous - it's just too bad it doesn't quite ring the bell." The Los Angeles Times said Clift was "first rate" but called the film "second rate."

=== Box office ===
The film was not a box-office success in France.
