= The Regattas of San Francisco =

1960 film by Claude Autant-Lara

The Regattas of San Francisco is a 1960 French film directed by Claude Autant-Lara. It was also known as Les régates de San Francisco.

There was a dispute between the producer, Raoul Levy, and the director, Claude Autant-Lara when the former insisted on making cuts to the movie. This resulted in the latter trying to take his name off the film.
