= Charles Fernley Fawcett =

American-born adventurer and film actor (1915 – 2008)

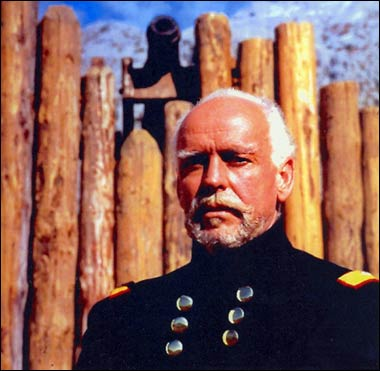
- Born: December 2, 1915; Waleska, Georgia, U.S.
- Died: February 3, 2008 (aged 92); London, England
- Occupations: Soldier; Actor; Filmmaker
- Military career
- Allegiance: Poland; Free France; United Kingdom; United States
- Branch: Polish Land Forces; Free French Army; Royal Air Force; Foreign Legion; Hellenic Army
- Unit: Hadfield-Spears Ambulance Unit
- Conflicts: World War II; Greek Civil War

Charles Fernley Fawcett (2 December 1915 – 3 February 2008) was an American adventurer, soldier, film actor, and a co-founder of the International Medical Corps. He was a recipient of the French Croix de Guerre and the American Eisenhower medal.

== Early life ==
Charles Fernley Fawcett was born in Waleska, Georgia. His family was of old Virginian stock, whose family tree included Thomas Jefferson and James Madison. When he was six, his mother was caught in a snow storm and died. Having been orphaned at an early age, Fawcett and his younger brother and two sisters grew up in Greenville, South Carolina, in the care of their aunt. Here he attended Greenville High School for three years where he learned to wrestle and play American football.

At age 15, Fawcett became involved in an affair with his best friend's mother. He remarked, "If that's child molestation, I would wish this curse on every young boy." The end of the affair made Fawcett contemplate suicide, and he left the United States in 1932 at age 16 to travel to the Far East, working his passage on a number of steamships with the U.S. Merchant Marine.

By 1937, he had returned to America and stayed for a time in New York City before making his way to Washington D.C., where he was taken in by his cousin, who happened to be an assistant United States Postmaster General. There, he ended up wrestling to make a living. Then in 1937 he boarded a ship outside Montreal bound for France, where he worked as an artist’s model, a jazz musician, and later a professional wrestler.

== World War II ==
After the outbreak of World War II in 1939, Fawcett joined the Polish Army but had been in barracks for only a week before escaping from the advancing Nazis and hitchhiking back to Paris. He tried to join both U.S. Intelligence and the French Armed Forces but his services were declined, so he briefly joined the Section Volontaire des Américains of the French ambulance corps in 1940. He was on his way to North Africa to join the French Resistance when he heard about Varian Fry, who would go on to rescue over 2,000 Jews from Vichy France with the help of a handful of people, Fawcett among them. Among the most famous people they rescued were Franz Werfel, Marc Chagall, Heinrich Mann and Hannah Arendt.

In Paris, Fawcett took part in the rescue of a group of British prisoners of war who had been placed under French guard in a hospital ward by the Germans. By impersonating a German ambulance crew, Fawcett and a comrade marched in at 4am and ordered the French nurses to usher the POWs out into the yard. "Gentlemen," he announced as he drove them away, "consider yourself liberated". "You're a Yank," said a British voice. "Never," came Fawcett's lilting southern burr, "confuse a Virginian with a Yankee".

In 1942, he enlisted in the Royal Air Force and trained as a fighter pilot, flying the Hawker Hurricane but was invalided out that Christmas with tuberculosis, from which he had suffered as a youth. After convalescing in a Canadian sanatorium, Fawcett made his way back to the United States in 1943. From New York, he traveled to a TB clinic in Arizona where he remained for about a year. In 1944, he returned to Italy and rejoined the American Ambulance Corps.

Towards the end of the war, Fawcett posed as the husband of six Jewish women in three months. This enabled the women, who had formerly been imprisoned in Nazi concentration camps, to leave France with an American visa. Eventually, he had to flee France at several hours' notice after a tip-off that the Gestapo was coming to arrest him.

Having left France, he joined up with the French Foreign Legion in 1945, fighting for six months in the forests of Alsace, and took part in the liberation of Colmar. A further bout of tuberculosis landed him in the Legionnaires' Hospital in Paris.

He was a recipient of the French Croix de Guerre and the American Eisenhower medal. His life was characterized by advocacy for marginalized individuals alongside pursuits of travel and public engagement. Fawcett was known for recounting stories of his experiences and humanitarian efforts to those he encountered.

== Post-war ==
By 1948, Fawcett was back in action serving in the Greek Army against the Communists during the Greek Civil War, fighting in a lounge suit in the guise of a journalist, since no foreigners were permitted to be involved.

In 1949, Fawcett pursued a cinematic career, in which he performed in over 100 films shot mostly in Europe, working with such stars as Errol Flynn, Alan Ladd and Robert Taylor. He combined this with smuggling refugees to safety from civil conflict, organizing earthquake relief teams, fighting in several wars and co-founding the International Medical Corps.

In 1956, Fawcett helped to rescue refugees from the Hungarian Uprising. Then he spent three years in the Belgian Congo, during the civil war in the early 60s, where he flew out those who were unable to escape the fighting. But it was the Soviet invasion of Afghanistan, in June 1979, that signaled his longest mission, and he was off to help the Afghan resistance fighters for the next 12 years.

In 2006, Fawcett was nominated for recognition as Righteous Among the Nations at the annual British Holocaust commemoration.

== Acting career ==
Fawcett appeared in some 100 film, television and radio productions between 1949 and 1976. He initially worked in France, but after 1952 worked primarily in Italy, having moved to Rome with his wife that year. During this time, he purportedly engaged in an affair with actress Hedy Lamarr.

== Personal life ==
Fawcett's first wife, with whom he had a daughter, died in 1956. In 1991, he married again, when after a 30-year engagement he married April Ducksbury, a British model agency executive, and settled in London.

== Death ==
Fawcett died on 3 February 2008 in London at the age of 92.

== Selected filmography ==
- Hans le marin (1949)
- Le grand rendez-vous (1950) – L'ambassadeur
- Casimir (1950) – Mr. Brown, le PDG de Prima
- Lost Souvenirs (1950) – L'Américain (segment "Une statuette d'Osiris") (uncredited)
- L'inconnue de Montréal (1950)
- Adventures of Captain Fabian (1951) – Defense Counsel
- Fugitive in Trieste (1951)
- Ils étaient cinq (1951)
- Ha da venì... don Calogero (1952) – Don Andrea
- When in Rome (1952) – Mr. Cates
- La Putain respectueuse (1952) – (uncredited)
- Three Forbidden Stories (1952) – Mottaroni (Second segment)
- I sette dell'Orsa maggiore (1953)
- The Unfaithfuls (1953) – Harry Rodgers
- The Blind Woman of Sorrento (1953) – Marchese di Rionero
- Terminal Station (1953) – Il signore triste all'ufficio postale (uncredited)
- Egypt by Three (1953) – American Doctor (second episode)
- The Enchanting Enemy (1953) – (uncredited)
- At the Edge of the City (1953)
- Fermi tutti... arrivo io! (1953) – Mr. Brown
- Frine, Courtesan of Orient (1953) – re Arconte
- Mizar (1954) – maggiore Crob
- The Country of the Campanelli (1954) – L'ammiraglio
- Pietà per chi cade (1954) – Oliver
- Appassionatamente (1954) – Count D'Alberti
- The Two Orphans (1954)
- An American in Rome (1954) – Mr. Brooks
- Goodbye Naples (1955) – Charles Burton
- Il falco d'oro (1955) – Ubaldo della Torre
- Andrea Chenier (1955)
- Incatenata dal destino (1956) – John Carrington
- Mai ti scorderò (1956) – Neri, il regista
- War and Peace (1956) – Russian artillery captain (uncredited)
- I Vampiri (1957) – Signor Robert
- Boy on a Dolphin (1957) – Bill B. Baldwin (uncredited)
- The Love Specialist (1957)
- The Violet Seller (1958) – Van de Ritzen
- The Last Rebel (1958) – Captain Harry Love
- Lonelyhearts (1958) – Smitty
- Civitas De (1958)
- No Time to Kill (1959) – Marine
- Face of Fire (1959) – Citizen in Barbershop
- La duchessa di Santa Lucia (1959) – Il padre di Archibald
- Les canailles (1960)
- The Loves of Salammbo (1960) – Annone
- Heaven on Earth (1960) – Henry Brent
- Come September (1961) – Warren (uncredited)
- Barabbas (1961) – Old Man Warning Rachel (uncredited)
- The Witch's Curse (1962) – Doctor
- It Happened in Athens (1962) – Ambassador Cyrus T. Gaylord
- The 300 Spartans (1962) – Megistias
- Zorro and the Three Musketeers (1963)
- I Am Semiramis (1963)
- Captain Sindbad (1963)
- Dark Purpose (1964) – Martin
- The Secret of Dr. Mabuse (1964) – Cmdr. Adams
- Panic Button (1964)
- Old Shatterhand (1964) – General Taylor
- Uncle Tom's Cabin (1965) – Mr. Shelby
- Wild Kurdistan (1965) – Scheik Mohammed Emin / Scheik Kadir Bei
- Kingdom of the Silver Lion (1965) – Scheik Kadir Bei
- Savage Pampas (1966) – Pvt. El Gato
- Spy Today, Die Tomorrow (1967) – General Stikker
- Target Frankie (1967) – Prof. Peers
- Caccia ai violenti (1968)
- The Girl of the Nile (1969) – Marco Alfieri
- The Massacre of Glencoe (1971) – John Macdonald
- Kalimán, el hombre increíble (1972) – Professor Morgan
- Down the Ancient Staircase (1975) – Doctor Sfameni
- Blue Belle (1976) – Michael / Annie's lover (final film role)
