= A Gentle Woman =

1969 film by Robert Bresson

- French Poster
- Une femme douce
- Directed by: Robert Bresson
- Written by: Robert Bresson
- Based on: "A Gentle Creature" by Fyodor Dostoevsky
- Produced by: Mag Bodard
- Starring: Dominique Sanda; Guy Frangin; Jeanne Lobre
- Cinematography: Ghislain Cloquet
- Edited by: Raymond Lamy
- Music by: Jean Wiener
- Production companies: Parc Film; Marianne Productions
- Distributed by: Paramount Pictures
- Release date: 28 August 1969 (France)
- Running time: 88 minutes
- Country: France
- Language: French

A Gentle Woman (French: Une femme douce), also titled A Gentle Creature, is a 1969 French drama film directed by Robert Bresson. It was Bresson's first film in colour and adapted from Fyodor Dostoevsky's 1876 short story "A Gentle Creature", moving the setting from 19th century Saint Petersburg to contemporary Paris.

== Plot ==
The film opens with a young woman jumping to her death from the balcony of her apartment. Near her body, her husband Luc reflects on their marriage and the possible reasons for her suicide in a series of flashbacks.

The couple first meets when she (Note: The titular character is only referred to as "elle" in the film, French for "she".) appears in Luc's pawnshop, selling belongings of her deceased family to finance her studies. Luc, who falls in love with her, finally manages to have her agree to his proposal. The marriage soon becomes strained, as Luc loves his dreamy, sensitive wife in a possessive, narcissistic way and tries to control her. When she starts going out in the afternoon regularly, he follows her and catches her offguard with another man, although it remains unclear if she is actually having an affair with him. The next morning, while Luc pretends to sleep, she takes his pistol and points it at his head, but refrains from shooting. Later, she falls ill. Luc apologises to her for his egotistical ways. Upon her recovery, she announces that she will try to be a loyal wife to him. While Luc is out, making arrangements for a vacation together, she commits suicide.

== Cast ==
- Dominique Sanda as Elle, the woman
- Guy Frangin as Luc, the husband
- Jeanne Lobre as Anna, the maid
- Claude Ollier as the doctor
- Dorothée Blanck (credited as Dorothée Blank) as the nurse

== Themes and style ==
In addition to changing the setting and time of Dostoevsky's story, Bresson eliminated the age gap between the couple, arguing that incommunicability between two people, which he regarded as a major theme of the film, "exists without a difference in age". The film's title he saw as ironic, agreeing with interviewer Charles Thomas Samuels's observation that the female character is "a terrible person in a way" and her suicide "a hostile act, dooming [her husband] to an eternity of grief unmitigated by understanding". In Robert Bresson: A Spiritual Style in Film, Joseph Cunneen concludes that "[a]lthough our sympathy is clearly with the gentle woman, the husband has suffered as well; the woman, perhaps instinctively, has found ways to torture him, undermining his need to dominate, attacking his system of values".

Bresson relied solely on non-professional actors in A Gentle Woman, as he had in all his films except for his very early work. Dominique Sanda, a fashion model, made her screen debut in the film. Bresson, who had seen her picture in a fashion magazine, later explained that he chose her just as a result of her first voice call.

Bresson subsequently made another adaptation of Dostoevsky, his next film Four Nights of a Dreamer (1971), based on White Nights.

== Release ==
A Gentle Woman premiered in France at the Director's Fortnight in May 1969 and in the US at the New York Film Festival in September the same year. After being long out of circulation, it was re-released in a restored version in France in 2013.
