= Guy Grosso =

French actor and humorist (1933–2001)

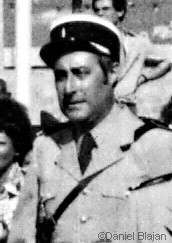
Grosso in 1978

Guy Grosso (19 August 1933 – 14 February 2001) was a French actor and humorist. Guy Grosso was the pseudonym of Guy Marcel Sarrazin. He was probably best known as half of Grosso and Modo (together with Michel Modo).

== Selected filmography ==
- La Belle Américaine (1961) – Barbemont
- Le procès (1962) – Josef K.'s Colleague (uncredited)
- Le Magot de Josefa (1963) – Un villageois
- La Foire aux cancres (1963)
- Bébert et l'Omnibus (1963) – Un gendarme
- Let's Rob the Bank (1964) – Un client
- Cherchez l'idole (1964) – Le visiteur à Europe 1 (uncredited)
- Une ravissante idiote (1964) – Le premier homme interrogé (uncredited)
- Dandelions by the Roots (1964) – Émile, le barman
- The Troops of St. Tropez (1964) – Maréchal des Logis Tricard
- The Gorillas (1964) – Un agent cycliste
- Me and the Forty Year Old Man (1965) – Le valet du casino (uncredited)
- The Sucker (1965) – Un douanier
- Pleins feux sur Stanislas (1965) – L'agent à la bicyclette qui verbalise #1
- How to Keep the Red Lamp Burning (1965) – Gédeon, le souteneur (segment "Les bons vivants")
- Gendarme in New York (1965) – Maréchal des Logis Tricard
- The Big Restaurant (1966) – Un serveur
- La Grande Vadrouille (1966) – Un bassonniste
- Les grandes vacances (1967) – Chastenet, un professeur
- The Gendarme Gets Married (1968) – Maréchal des Logis Berlicot
- La Honte de la famille (1969) – Dieudonné Hadol
- Le champignon (1970) – L'acteur du film publicitaire
- Le gendarme en balade (1973) – Maréchal des Logis Tricard
- The Edifying and Joyous Story of Colinot (1973) – Lucas
- Opération Lady Marlène (1975) – Le brigadier
- Chobizenesse (1975) – Frère Boussenard
- Ne me touchez pas... (1977) – Paul Gruber, l'ingénieur du son
- Le mille-pattes fait des claquettes (1977) – Le brigadier de gendarmerie
- The Gendarme and the Extra-Terrestrials (1979) – Maréchal des Logis Tricard
- Charles et Lucie (1979) – De la Madriguière
- Les Phallocrates (1980) – Corbeau
- The Miser (1980) – Brindavoine
- Salut, j'arrive (1982) – Un agent de police
- The Troops & Troop-ettes (1982) – Maréchal des Logis Tricard
- Y a-t-il un pirate sur l'antenne ? (1983) – L'agent Bauju
