= Very Happy Alexander =

1968 French comedy film

- Directed by: Yves Robert
- Written by: Yves Robert
- Starring: Philippe Noiret
- Music by: Vladimir Cosma
- Distributed by: Films de la Colombe; Madeleine Films; La Guéville
- Release dates: 9 February 1968 (France); 17 February 1969 (U.S.); 21 December 1973 (West Germany)
- Running time: 100 minutes
- Country: France
- Language: French
- Box office: $16,645,537

Very Happy Alexander (French: Alexandre le Bienheureux, "Blissful Alexander") is a 1968 French comedy film, written and directed by Yves Robert, starring Philippe Noiret, Marlène Jobert and Françoise Brion.

The film was released on DVD on 4 May 2004.

== Brief summary ==
Philippe Noiret plays a henpecked childless farmer that lives oppressed by his authoritarian and materialistic wife, being the only worker in his farm. Whenever he attempts to take a small rest, indulge in any distraction, or simply falls asleep out of exhaustion, there she is chasing him to move on. When she and her elderly parents are killed in a car accident, he decides that the time has come to take it easy and enjoy life a little, sets all his livestock free, and then practically disappears. The only clue that he is still alive is his dog, who periodically goes shopping to the nearby town with a basket in its mouth. Concerns about Alexander's fate are the center of the town's gossip. After several attempts, a delegation sent by the citizens finds he has retired—to his bed. This creates no small social upheaval in this working-class small French town where hard work is regarded as a virtue, and hence his attitude is viewed as a scandal and a menace.

== Cast ==
- Philippe Noiret – Alexandre
- Françoise Brion – La Grande, Alexandre's wife
- Marlène Jobert – Agathe
- Paul Le Person – Sanguin
- Tsilla Chelton – Madame Bouillot
- Léonce Corne – Lamendin
- Pierre Richard – Colibert
- Jean Saudray – Pinton
- Marcel Bernier – Malicorne
- Bernard Charlan – The mayor
- Madeleine Damien – Madame Boisseau
- Pierre Maguelon – Verglandier
- François Vibert – Alexandre's father in law
- Jean Carmet – La Fringale

== Production ==
The film was partially shot in the village of Alluyes, in Eure-et-Loir.
