= Attack of the Robots =

- French film poster
- Directed by: Jesús Franco
- Screenplay by: Jean-Claude Carrière
- Story by: Jesús Franco
- Starring: Eddie Constantine; Françoise Brion; Fernando Rey; Sophie Hardy
- Cinematography: Antonio Macasoli
- Edited by: Marie-Louise Barberot
- Music by: Paul Misraki
- Production companies: Hesperia Film; Cine Alliance; Spéva Films
- Distributed by: CEPICSA (Madrid); Société Nouvelle de Cinématographe - Les Film Imperia (Paris)
- Release dates: 27 March 1966 (France); 1 August 1966 (Madrid)
- Running time: 94 minutes
- Countries: Spain; France
- Budget: Pts 19,860,000

Attack of the Robots (Spanish: Cartas boca arriba, lit. 'Cards Face Up') is a 1966 spy film directed by Jesús Franco. The film stars Eddie Constantine as Al Pereira, a spy brought out of retirement to investigate a series of murders conducted by a robot-like army of people with black-framed glasses and strange darkened skin.

The film was a co-production between the Madrid-based Hesperia Film and the Paris-based Cine Alliance and Spéva Films, the same group that had previously financed The Diabolical Dr. Z (1966). Franco signed on to the project after it had already been sold throughout the world as a project starring Constantine in a spy-oriented narrative. Written by Jean-Claude Carrière, it would be the last of his collaborations with Franco. The two decided to play on the perceived notion of Constantine's film persona, making his character a more clumsy spy.

The film was released in France and Spain in 1966. The film debuting at ninth spot in Paris box office between April 27 to May 3 while film historians Francesco Cesari and Roberto Curti described the film as being a "good commercial success" in Spain. While reviews in Spanish newspapers ABC and El Mundo Deportivo gave generally positive reviews to the film, it was received poorly by the critics of Spanish film magazine Film Ideal and the French magazine Image et son.

== Plot ==
Several politicians are murdered around the world by robot-like individuals who don black-framed glasses and have strange darkened skin. When captured, these characters often die, leading to their skin tone returning to normal. After discovering each of these murderers has the blood type Rhesus 0, Interpol sends one of their agents with the same blood type as bait to solve this mystery. Al Pereira, a retired agent. Pereira dons the identity of Frank Froeba and investigates the situation in Alicante. There, he thwarts his kidnapping by the servants of Lee-Wee, a Chinese crime syndicate boss, who is also trying to discover the mystery of these murders for his nefarious use.

The masterminds behind the crimes are revealed to be Lady Cecilia and Sir Percy, who created an army of mind-controlled people to carry out the murders. Meanwhile, Pereira meets Cynthia Lewis and suspects her of being affiliated with criminals. After Pereira thwarts an attack on him by one of the robot-like people, he dons the individual's spectacles, falling under the influence of Cecilia and Percy and is summoned to their hideout. It revealed that Cynthia, an Interpol agent herself, is imprisoned. Cynthia removes Pereira's glasses allowing him to overcome Cecilia and Percy's control. He fools Cecilia and attempts to seduce her, leading an enraged Percy to shoot at him, accidentally hitting Cecilia. The event triggers the villain's base to explode, giving Cynthia and Pereira time to escape.

== Cast ==
Cast adapted from the book The Films of Jesus Franco, 1953-1966 (2024)

- Eddie Constantine as Al Pereira
- Françoise Brion as Lady Cecilia Addington Courtney
- Fernando Rey as Sir Percy
- Sophie Hardy as Cynthia Lewis
- Alfredo Mayo as Inspector Baxter
- Marcelo Arroita-Jáuregui as Olsen, Interpol Agent

== Production ==
Attack of the Robots was a co-production between the Madrid-based Hesperia Film and the Paris-based Cine Alliance and Spéva Films, the same companies that had previously signed to finance director Jesus Franco's film The Diabolical Dr. Z (1966). On February 23, 1965, the film companies signed to develop the film with actor Eddie Constantine.

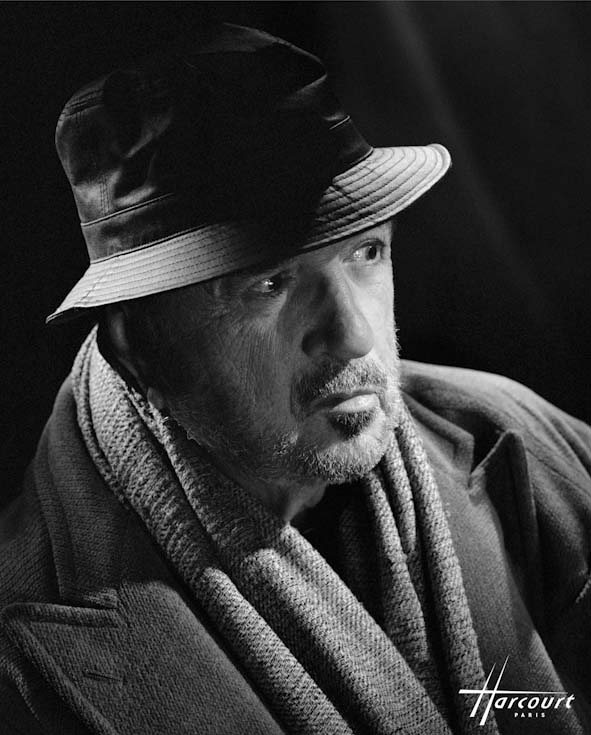
Attack of the Robots was the last collaboration between screenwriter Jean-Claude Carrière (pictured) and director Jesús Franco.

Constantine was an American singer who moved to France in the 1950s and embarked on a career in acting, becoming a popular actor through his role as the secret agent Lemmy Caution in a series of spy films starting with La môme vert-de-gris (1953). Director Jesús Franco was not a fan of Constantine's acting or his films, stating the actor had "one of the world's most expressionless faces". Franco changed his mind after Constantine had starred in Jean-Luc Godard's film Alphaville (1965), later briefly referenced by the director in Attack of the Robots. Franco further elaborated the casting and narrative, stating that the film was already pre-sold to distributors, and those buyers required Constantine to play either an FBI or CIA agent, saying "they want him to play what he always does, on which Constantine's success depends". Franco said to subvert this, he had screenwriter Jean-Claude Carrière make Constantine's character a clumsy secret agent. The film was the last collaboration between Franco and Carrière, with Franco stating that the writer had become so high profile, he could not afford to pay his fee. Carrière had openly dismissed b-films, and said that Franco had "great taste in films...At the same time, he could not comply with the discipline of the shooting [...] It was always too slow or too long, things had to be done quickly [...] same with the script: he could tear off a whole page of it if he needed to. This means we go from one point to another without knowing well what connects them." Following the film's release, Franco had suggested several projects where he would collaborate again with Carrière that never went into development.

The film had a higher budget than the previous co-production, initially being budgeted at 24 million Spanish pesetas, the budget was eventually reduced to 19,860,000. In a document dated August 5, the cast was listed differently compared to the final product. Along with Constantine and actor Fernando Rey, two French actresses were included: Geneviève Cluny as Cynthia and Françoise Prévost as Lady Cecilia. By September 7, the actors listed in a shooting permit changed again with Diana Lorys as Cynthia and Estella Blain as Cecilia. The director of photography was also listed as either Antonio Macasoli or Juan Mariné, with Macasoli ultimately being chosen. Paul Misraki replaced Daniel White as the film's composer very shortly before the film required a score.

Filming began on October 18, 1965, in Alicante. It would continue into November with a 12-day shoot in Alicante, six days for filming in Estudios Ballesteros and 24 days of exteriors in Madrid. During filming in November, Sophie Hardy was driving back to Madrid from Alicante when her car went off-road and turned over leaving the actress unconscious off the road. A report in Variety described the accident as "near-fatal" and that it extended shooting by two weeks. When returning to the set, Hardy wore a wig to hide the consequences of the accident. On December 2, Constantine's mother died leading the actor to return to Paris and then returning shortly after to Estudios Balesteros for the last days of shooting. Filming ended on December 4.

== Release ==
Attack of the Robots was first released theatrically in France on March 27, 1966, as Cartes sure table (transl. Cards on the Table). It was distributed in Paris by Cinématographe - Les Film Imperia. The film debuted at ninth spot in Paris box office between April 27 to May 3, with 41,033 admissions in Paris and 620,902 admissions in France. Comparatively, this was higher than Alphaville, but not as successful as Constantine's earlier hit films.

Prior to release in Spain, the film was released in West Germany and Portugal. It was distributed in Madrid by CEPICSA, on August 1, 1966, two weeks before The Diabolical Dr. Z. Film historians Francesco Cesari and Roberto Curti described the film as a "good commercial success" in Spain, with 553,400 spectators, which was still lower than his next two spy films: Residencia para espías and Lucky, the Inscrutable.

Between 1966 and 1968, the film was released in Canada, Finland, Netherlands, Belgium, Sweden, Denmark and Turkey. When the film was released to American television through American International Television on October 6, 1967, it was titled Attack of the Robots.

The American version of the film was only available through grey market, in formats that Franco biographer Stephen Thrower described as a "monstrously ugly transfer". Thrower noted a French DVD release of the film was uncropped and a better transfer. A Blu-ray disc of Attack of the Robots was released by Redemption Films on July 16, 2019. Adam Tynes of DVD Talk commented that while he found Attack of the Robots to be shot well, he found the Blu-ray transfer was marked by "pervasive and unmistakable" macroblocking.

== Reception ==
In Spain, Film Ideal had only three of the nineteen critics see the film, with José Maria Latorre and Manolo Marinero giving the film a one-star out of five rating, while Felix Martialay gave it three stars. Latorre wrote a full review in Film Ideal in December, writing that the parody-styled take on Constantine's character overloaded with ridiculous images. Madrid-based newspaper ABC, said that Franco gave Constantine "one of his best performances in years" while El Mundo Deportivo complimented the photography of Macasoli and Misraki's "inspired melody", and finding Franco's direction to be masterful. In France, film critic Raymond Lefèvre wrote in Image et son that the film could have been good if the director had taken it more seriously as the narrative was interesting.

Franco responded to criticism in a column in the magazine Griffith, writing that Attack of the Robots was solely designed for entertainment. He supposed the films "can teach while delighting, as old prospects say, but I recognize that I don't know how. I only try to 'delight', which seems difficult enough to me. [...] Cinema, to me, has a fleeting life. It's just images that pass to entertain millions of human beings. And this is what [Attack of the Robots] aims to be, a comedy of action, crime, satire, and humor..."

From retrospective reviews, Stephen Thrower in his Murderous Passions: The Delirious Cinema of Jesús Franco (2015) found the film to be a "major disappointment" writing that "nothing, not even the title, seems to work" and finding characters to be thrown into the mix with little design or purpose, and even the film's title was a crude attempt to lure audiences with a pulp science fiction premise. Tynes wrote that the film was "an infectiously fun Eurospy romp". Although thinking that critical characters would vanish for over half an hour of time, he declared that the film "isn't the least bit worse off for all that".
