= Un monde nouveau =

1966 film

- Film poster
- Directed by: Vittorio De Sica
- Written by: Cesare Zavattini
- Produced by: Raymond Froment
- Starring: Christine Delaroche
- Cinematography: Jean Boffety
- Edited by: Paul Cayatte
- Release date: 16 May 1966
- Running time: 83 minutes
- Countries: France; Italy
- Language: French

Un monde nouveau is a 1966 French-Italian drama film directed by Vittorio De Sica. Most notably it featured Sean Connery as himself. Harry Saltzman produced the film.

== Plot ==
Anne (Christine Delaroche), a beautiful photographer, has a love affair with Carlo (Nino Castelnuovo), and becomes pregnant. Carlo wants her to have an abortion and sleeps with a wealthy woman to get money to pay for it, but Ann decides against losing her unborn child.

== Cast ==
- Christine Delaroche as Anne
- Nino Castelnuovo as Carlo
- Madeleine Robinson as Wealthy woman
- Pierre Brasseur as Photographer
- Georges Wilson as Medical professor
- Isa Miranda
- Françoise Brion
- Tanya Lopert as Mary
- Jeanne Aubert
- Jean-Pierre Darras
- Franco Bucceri
- Antoine De Rudder
- Arlette Gilbert
- Paul Mercey
- Charles Millot
- Laure Paillette
- Nadeige Ragoo as Judith
- Sean Connery as playing Himself (uncredited): "Carlo" tries getting a photo of Connery at the Paris premiere of Goldfinger
