= Je vous salue, mafia! =

- Directed by: Raoul Lévy
- Written by: Jean Cau (dialogue); Pierre Lesou (novel)
- Release date: 1965
- Countries: France; Italy
- Language: Italian

Je vous salue, mafia! (Mafia, I Salute You or Hail Mafia) is a 1965 French Italian film directed by Raoul Lévy. It was released in Italy as Mafia, Yo Te Saludo. The film is based on a Pierre Lesou novel, which is also named Je vous salue, mafia!

It is a film noir.

== Cast ==
- Eddie Constantine as Rudy
- Henry Silva as Schaft
- Jack Klugman as Phil
- Elsa Martinelli as Sylvia
- Micheline Presle as Daisy
- Michael Lonsdale as Secretary
- Carl Studer as Ruidosa
- Ricky Cooper as Ben
- Tener Eckelberry as Hyman
