= List of Israeli films of the 1960s =

A list of films produced in Israel in the 1960s.

== Overview ==
Israeli cinema gained more popularity with the decision to grant tax refunds on the purchase of theater tickets, which initiated the production of Israeli films by commercial companies, expecting a reasonable return on their investment and gain in profits. Menahem Golan, Ephraim Kishon, and Uri Zohar were the most prominent and active Israeli movie makers during the 1960s.

The Israeli films during the 1960s dealt with the misunderstanding between the Jews that came from the Middle East, and the Jews that came from Europe. One of these films was Fortuna (פורטונה) which was directed by Menahem Golan; however, it didn't fully utilize the conflict yet and still continued to have plot lines and characters which originated in the 1950s. The films from the 1950s evolved into the "main genre" films: popular and commercial films which were compatible with the ideological optimism and happiness to finally have a country that these times are mostly remembered for. At the same time, two different genres evolved, which had different artistic and ideological styles. The first Bourekas film was Sallah Shabati which was produced by Ephraim Kishon in 1964. Correspondingly, in 1965 Uri Zohar produced the film Hole in the Moon which was the first in the "New sensitivity" film movement which sought to bring the Israeli film features which were taken from the highest quality European cinema, particularly the French New Wave films. These two genres fully evolved during the 1970s.
