= Raoul Lévy =

Belgian film producer (1922–1966)

Raoul Levy (14 April 1922 – 31 December 1966) was a Belgian-born French film producer, writer and director best known for a series of movies he made starring Brigitte Bardot. He was born in Antwerp.

== Death ==
He committed suicide after losing most of his fortune making a film about the life of Marco Polo. He shot himself in the chest outside the front door of the St Tropez house of production assistant Isabelle Pons, who had recently ended a two-year affair with Levy.

Levy was survived by a wife and fifteen-year-old son.

== Select credits ==
- Paris Vice Squad (1951) – producer
- The Proud and the Beautiful (1953) – associate producer
- And God Created Woman (1956) – producer, writer
- The Night Heaven Fell (1958) – producer
- Love Is My Profession (1958) – producer
- Babette Goes to War (1959) – producer, story
- Les Régates de San Francisco (1960) – producer
- Seven Days... Seven Nights (1960) – producer
- The Truth (1960) – producer
- Marco the Magnificent (1965) – producer, writer, director
- Hail, Mafia (1965) – producer, writer, director
- The Defector (1966) – producer, writer, director
- Two or Three Things I Know About Her (1967) – producer
