= Michel Ruhl =

French actor (1934–2022)

- Born: 2 February 1934; Paris, France
- Died: 15 January 2022 (aged 87); Guérande, France
- Occupation: Actor
- Years active: 1960–2021

Michel Ruhl (2 February 1934 – 15 January 2022) was a French actor.

== Life and career ==
Ruhl became widely known for his role as Jean de Plessis-Vaudreuil in the series Au plaisir de Dieu, directed by Robert Mazoyer. He began his career in 1952 under the direction of Gérard Philipe. He held his first major role in the theatre with a staging of Long Day's Journey into Night at the Théâtre Hébertot in Paris. He began acting in film in 1963 with Your Shadow is Mine. He then appeared in the films Nick Carter and Red Club and Nouveau journal d'une femme en blanc.

In addition to his acting career, Ruhl was well known for dubbing. He was known for playing the voices of James Cromwell, Scott Wilson, and Terence Stamp.

Ruhl died in Guérande on 15 January 2022, at the age of 87.

== Filmography ==
=== Cinema ===
- Your Shadow is Mine (1963)
- Nick Carter and Red Club (1965)
- Nouveau journal d'une femme en blanc (1966)
- L'Oiseau rare (1973)
- Maître Pygmalion (1975)
- Gloria Mundi (1976)
- Police Python 357 (1976)
- If I Had to Do It All Over Again (1976)
- The Toy (1976)
- La Menace (1977)
- Death of a Corrupt Man (1977)
- On peut le dire sans se fâcher (1978)
- Le Mouton noir (1979)
- L'Œil du maître (1980)
- La provinciale (1981)
- The Passion of Bernadette (1989)
- Wild Reeds (1994)
- Coco Chanel & Igor Stravinsky (2009)

=== Short film ===
- Il va faire jour mon amour (2013)
