= The Diabolical Dr. Z =

1966 film

- Spanish theatrical release poster
- Directed by: Jesús Franco
- Screenplay by: Jean-Claude Carrière
- Story by: Jesus Franco
- Produced by: Michel Safra; Serge Silberman
- Starring: Estella Blain; Mabel Karr
- Cinematography: Alejandro Ulloa
- Edited by: Jean Feyte
- Music by: Daniel White
- Production companies: Hesperia Films; Spéva Films; Ciné Alliance
- Distributed by: Mercurio; Mondial; D.U.K. Films; U.S. Films Inc.
- Release dates: 11 March 1966 (Mallorca); 22 November 1967 (France)
- Running time: 87 minutes
- Countries: Spain; France

The Diabolical Dr. Z (Spanish: Miss Muerte) is a 1966 horror film directed by Jesús Franco. The film stars Mabel Karr as Irma Zimmer, a surgeon who creates a machine that turns people into zombified slaves. Ms. Zimmer is the daughter of a Professor Zimmer (a disciple of Dr. Orloff), who was hounded to his death several years earlier by four of his scientific associates. Zimmer uses the machine to control an erotic dancer named Miss Muerte (Estella Blain) who uses her long poison-tipped fingernails to murder the people Ms. Zimmer holds responsible for her father's death.

== Plot ==
Woman seeks to avenge her father's death by using a local dancer, with long poisonous fingernails, to do her bidding.

== Cast ==
- Estella Blain as Nadia
- Mabel Karr as Irma Zimmer
- Howard Vernon as Dr. Vicas
- Fernando Montes as Philippe
- Marcelo Arroita Jauregui as Dr. Moroni (as Marcelo Arroita)
- Cris Huerta as Dr. Kallman
- Antonio Escribano as Policeman (as Albert Bourbon)
- Guy Mairesse as Hans Bergen

== Production ==
The Diabolical Dr. Z was written by Jean-Claude Carrière based on a story by director Jesús Franco. The film is loosely based on the 1940 novel The Bride Wore Black. The film's opening credits state that it is based on "a novel by David Khune" which is an alter-ego for director Jesús Franco. Franco would later re-use elements from the plot of The Diabolical Dr. Z in his later films including The Blood of Fu Manchu (1968) and She Killed in Ecstasy (1971).

The film was tentatively titled Doctor Z. y Miss Muerte and was a Spanish and French co-production. Respectively It was 60% Spanish and 40% French. It was produced between the Madrid-based Hesperia Films and the Paris-based Spéva Films and Ciné Alliance.

Despite being one of Franco's favorite films of his earlier period, Franco has stated that the film "shouldn't have been made... Censorship was causing me troubles."

== Release ==
The Diabolical Dr. Z was released as Miss Muerte in Spain, and had its Spanish premiere at Mallorca at Palacio Avenida on March 11, 1966. It opened in several other theatres in Spain in 1966 in cities such as Madrid and Barcelona and later showing in Sevilla in 1967. Starting in 1965, Spanish film venues were under obligation to provide the ministry with the number of spectators for each film. According to the database. Miss Meurte had 360,990 spectators, a number much lower than Franco's subsequent film productions. The film had 360,990 admissions in Spain and grossed a 2019 equivalent of €30,787.00 domestically.

Most of the films profits came from foreign countries. A version with an English-language dub was released as The Diabolical Dr. Z with a run time of 78 minutes. It was released by E.J. Fancey's D.U.K. films on a double bill with the Italian horror film The Embalmer (1965). In the United States, it received the same title and was set for distribution for television and theatrical release by SGS Productions of New York. The initial American release was slated for August 1966 but was post-poned to February 156, 1967 where it was released on the second half of a double bill with I Crossed the Color Line (1966). It was released in France on November 22, 1967, as Dans les griffes du maniaque while the French-language version had already been released in Canada in Ottawa at Cine de Paris on November 4, 1967.

The Diabolical Dr. Z was released on DVD by the Mondo Macabro label on 29 April 2003. A Blu-ray release was issued by Kino International in 2018, with Budd Wilkins of Slant Magazine noting that it surpassed the "already visually impressive" DVD from Mondo Macabro.

== Reception ==
In a contemporary review, the Monthly Film Bulletin noted that Franco "shows an eye for unusual images-notably in Miss Death's bizarre but rather tame dance act"

From retrospective reviews, The online film database Allmovie gave the film three stars, praising it as "One of Franco's most entertaining films, Miss Muerte is a great improvement over the similar El Secreto del Dr. Orloff"

== See also ==
- List of French films of 1966
- List of horror films of 1966
- List of Spanish films of 1966
