= Françoise Brion =

French actress (1933–2025)

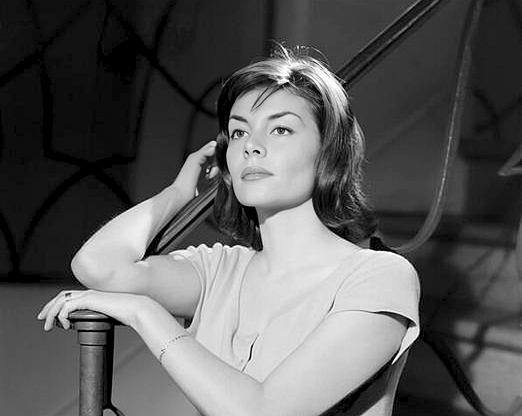
- Brion in 1958
- Born: 29 January 1933; Paris, France
- Died: 12 December 2025 (aged 92); Paris, France
- Occupation: Actress
- Years active: 1957–2003
- Spouse: Jacques Doniol-Valcroze

Françoise Brion (French: [bʁijɔ̃])(born Françoise Alicia Rose German de Ribon; 29 January 1933 – 12 December 2025) was a French film actress. She appeared in 75 films from 1957. She starred in the 1963 film L'Immortelle, which was entered into the 13th Berlin International Film Festival. She was married to Jacques Doniol-Valcroze. Brion died in Paris on 12 December 2025, at the age of 92.

== Selected filmography ==
- That Night (1958)
- Witness in the City (1959)
- Women Are Like That (1960)
- L'eau a la bouche (1960)
- And Satan Calls the Turns (1962)
- Codine (1963)
- Sweet and Sour (1963)
- L'Immortelle (1963)
- Portuguese Vacation (1963)
- Attack of the Robots (1966)
- Un monde nouveau (1966)
- To Grab the Ring (1968)
- Alexandre le bienheureux (1968)
- Caravan to Vaccarès (1974)
- Julien Fontanes, magistrat (1981–82)
- Count Max (1991)
- Nelly and Mr. Arnaud (1995)
- Season's Beatings (1999)
- Les Liaisons dangereuses (2003) TV
- Le Divorce (2003)
