= Christine Delaroche =

French actress (born 1944)

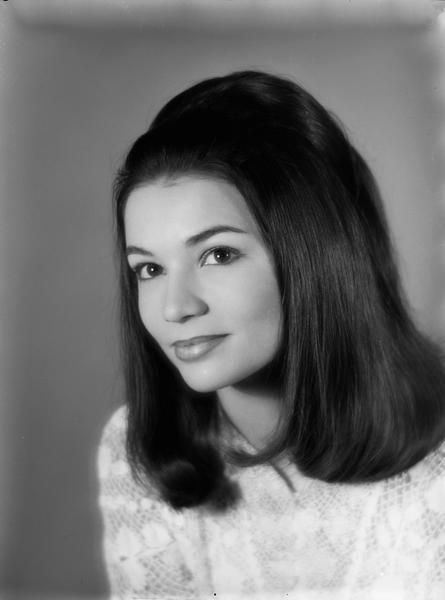
- Born: 24 May 1944 (age 81); Paris, France
- Occupation: Actress
- Years active: 1965-present

Christine Delaroche (born 24 May 1944) is a French actress and singer. She has appeared in 21 films and television shows since 1965. She starred in the 1966 film Un monde nouveau, which was directed by Vittorio De Sica.

== Filmography ==
- Mouche (film, 1968)
- Belphégor (TV Miniseries - 1965)
- Un monde nouveau (1966)
- The Defector (1966)
- A Midsummer Night's Dream (1969) (1969)
- The New Avengers episode "K is For Kill" as Jeanine Leparge
- A Crime in Paradise (2001)

== Discography ==
- La Porte à côté (1966)
- La Fille du soleil (1966)
