= Jean-Claude Drouot =

Belgian actor

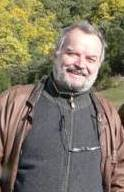
- Drouot in 2012
- Born: 17 December 1938 (age 87); Lessines, Hainaut, Belgium
- Occupation: Actor
- Years active: 1963–present
- Spouse: Claire Drouot

Jean Claude Drouot (French: [ʒɑ̃ klod dʁuo]; born 17 December 1938) is a Belgian actor whose career has lasted over a half-century. At the age of twenty-five, he gained widespread fame in the French-speaking world as a result of portraying the title role in the popular television adventure series, Thierry la Fronde.

== Biography ==
Born in the Belgian municipality of Lessines, Jean Claude Drouot learned his stagecraft with the Young Theater of the Université libre de Bruxelles (ULB). Later (date unknown) he moved from Brussels to Paris, where he followed courses with Charles Dullin. Until his departure from Dullin's troupe in 1962, he performed the great tragedies and plays of Molière. From 1963 until 1966 he starred as Thierry La Fronde for the TV series Thierry La Fronde. He made his first film in 1965 with The Devil's Tricks of Paul Vecchiali. This was followed by Happiness. He then played in British and American films such as Laughter in the Dark (1969) and Nicholas and Alexandra (1971). In 1984, he became director of the National Dramatic Center of Reims and, from 1985 to 1989, he was director of the National Theatre of Belgium. In 1999, he joined the Comédie-Française.

He is married to Claire and has two children, Olivier and Sandrine. His family made their only film appearance in the 1965 Agnès Varda film, Le Bonheur.

== Selected filmography ==
- Thierry La Fronde (1963–1966) as Thierry La Fronde
- The Devil's Tricks (1965) as Daniel
- Le Bonheur (1965) as François
- Laughter in the Dark (1969) as Herve Tourace
- Mr. Freedom (1969) as Dick Sensass
- A Midsummer Night's Dream as Oberon
- The Breach (1970) as Charles Regnier
- The Light at the Edge of the World (1971) as Virgilio
- Nicholas and Alexandra (1971) as Mr. Gilliard
- Les Gens de Mogador (1972) as Rodolphe Vernet
- L'histoire très bonne et très joyeuse de Colinot trousse-chemise (1973) as Masnil Plassac
- Gaston Phébus (1978) as Gaston Phébus
- The Year of the French (1982) as General Humbert
- Les Rois maudits (2005) as Enguerrand de Marigny
- The Conquerors (2013) as Joseph Tadoussac
- Capitaine Marleau (2017, 2020) as Léopold Salaun (2 Episodes, 1 Episode)
- (2019) Meurtres en Corrèze, as le Papy
