= Le Père Noël a les yeux bleus =

- Directed by: Jean Eustache
- Written by: Jean Eustache
- Produced by: Luc Moullet
- Starring: Jean-Pierre Léaud; Gérard Zimmermann; Henri Martinez
- Cinematography: Philippe Théaudière
- Edited by: Christiane Lack
- Music by: René Coll; César Gattegno
- Release date: 1966 (Cannes)
- Running time: 50 min.
- Language: French

Le Père Noël a les yeux bleus (1966) is a fifty-minute film starring French nouvelle vague icon Jean-Pierre Léaud, whose character takes on a job dressing up as Santa Claus in order to save money for a stylish duffel coat. It was the second commercial film made by French director Jean Eustache, who would go on to make several other featurettes.

The title translates as Santa Claus Has Blue Eyes.
