= Jesús Franco's unrealized projects =

During his long career, Spanish film director Jesús Franco has worked on a number of projects which never progressed beyond the pre-production stage under his direction.

== Pre-1960s ==
Franco had partnered with León Klimovsky on a project that was a series of period films made for Spanish television titled Los grandes amantes de la historia (Women's Decisions). The series was reportedly about "History's great lovers", and was to be produced by Ladislao Veszi's Urania Films. The series was to include El último amor de Lucrecia Borgia (transl. Lucrezia Borgi'as Last Love) and La maja desnuda (transl. The Naked Maja). Other brief outlines of stories involving Cleopatra, Christina, Queen of Sweden, Mary Stuart, Boabdil, Lola Montes, Bettina von Arnim, Isabella I of Castile, and Potiphar's wife.

Shortly after filming Tenemos 18 años (1959), a trio of short films were requested: Roncesvalles, Segovia ciudad fantasma, and Viaje al año mil which were grouped under the title España, nuestra desconocida (transl. Our Unknown Spain). Franco also provided the screenplay for Roncesvalles and Segovia ciudad fantasma. The films would be part of a documentary series narrated by Isana Medel showcasing the remote corners of Spain. The series was partly filmed per recollections of Medele. Franco has implied in later interviews that the shorts may have been completed.

== 1960s ==
=== Unfinished and unreleased shorts ===
El destierro del Cid (transl. The Exile of the Cid), a documentary short was set to be made as part of 12-part series. While Franco said the series was to be made for RKO Radio Pictures, film historians Roberto Curti and Roberto Cesari suggested this was a lie on Franco's part as means of self-promotion. While filmed in 1960, it went unreleased.

Following El destierro del Cid, a separate short film titled Las playas vacías (transl. The Empty Beaches) was filmed. Its work featured Franco credited as the director, the story and screenplay, as well as a music credit. The film was a documentary on San Sebastián. Copies of both El destierro del Cid and Las playas vacías are kept at Filmoteca Española.

=== La dama del Sur ===
In October 1960, Primer Plano reported that Mikaela was reading a new script titled La dama del Sur (transl. The Lady of the South). Shooting was scheduled to be shot on April 20, 1961. The film was going to be a Spanish film noir-styled film made as a Spanish and French co-production.

Franco last discussing the film in September 1961. He wrote the screenplay for La dama del Sur and was set to direct.

=== Los colgados aka Los vengadores ===
Filming for Los colgados was set to start on July 20, 1961. As the films shooting scripts was continuously denied by Spanish censors, Franco was denied a shooting permit. The title was changed from Los colgados (transl. The Hanged) to Los vengadores transl. The Avengers) during this period.

In a 1994 interview, Franco discussed these two films stating that they were about bandits of Andalusia at the turn of the 20th century, while later saying in 1996 that they were based on a popular story he knew from his childhood.

Franco regretted not being able to make the films, stating in 1994 that "if I had made [Los colgados aka Los vengadores], I don't know, my career might have been very different [...] because those were two important films."

=== Sangre en mis zapatos aka 077 Mision Lisbóa ===
After working on Death Whistles the Blues, the September 13, 1962 issue of Radiocinema announced that Franco was going to start production on a film titled Sangre en mis zapatos (transl. Blood on My Shoes). A week later, Franco announced he would direct a film titled La calle de laos hombres perdidos. It is not confirmed if this was the same film as Sangre en mis zapatos. Following this, another untitled film starring Eddie Constantine was announced. A notice of Sangre en mis zapatos announced again as a Spanish-French co-production was announced in an issue of Cine en 7 días. Franco left directing the project, to work for Orson Welles on Chimes at Midnight (1966) and La isla del tesoro, leaving the film to be directed by Tulio Demicheli. On the films script, it is titled 077 Mision Lisbóa (transl. 077 Mission Lisbon).

=== La isla del tesoro ===
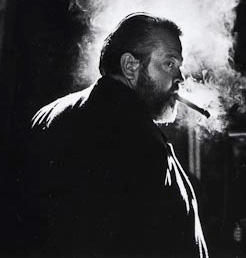
Orson Welles in Spain in 1964. Jesús Franco began work an adaptation of Treasure Island starring Welles during this year.

While Welles was working on Chimes at Midnight, he met with Spanish producer Emiliano Piedra, the head of Internacional Films Española (IFE). In order to persuade Piedra on the commercial potential of his film, he agreed with the producer to develop a second production: La isla del tesoro, based on Robert Louis Stevenson's Treasure Island. The project was set to be a Spanish and Swiss co-production between IFE and Welles' own Alpine Films. Welles suggested that La isla del tesoror would get a good subsidy as a Spanish production, but it would require a Spanish director. Welles had reportedly chosen Franco as the director after seeing one of his earlier films. By Franco's recollection, Welles told him to choose his crew and actors and he would show up to play his scenes as Long John Silver. Welles however wrote on his own in September 1964 "I will make it very clear to the second unit director what he has to do over the next two weeks."

Filming began on October 5, 1964. Due to his commitment to the film, Franco had to cancel other commitments. In July 1964, he was named as the director for Lola, espejo oscuro, which was adapted to the screen in 1966 by Fernando Merino. Franco was also set to play a secret agent in a film starring Constantine to be directed by Marcel Ophuls. Shooting for La isla del tesoro was cancelled. Franco initially said in 1971 that this was due to bad weather, while in his biography, Franco stated that Welles took over the project to focus on Chimes at Midnight. Welles would make a different adaptation of the film with producer Harry Alan Towers as Treasure Island (1972) which only used some footage of shots Franco shot at sea. Franco claimed in the early 1980s he would attempting a new version of the story with Lionel Stander, which did not go into production.

=== Ottmar o la garra del monstruo ===
Following work on Chimes at Midnight and La isla del tesoro, Alfredy Matas Salina, the president of the company Jet Films dlivered a screenplay for a horror film to be co-produced with France titled Ottmar ola garra del monstruo (transl. Ottmar, or The Monster's Claw). The Spanish adaptation of the dialogue was the work of Franco, would also direct the picture. The project went unfilmed.

=== La noche tiene ojos ===
La noche tiene ojos (transl. The Night Has Eyes) is an unfilmed project to be directed and was written by Franco. It was announced as his next film project in early 1965. The script for the film was rejected by Spanish censor boards, which led him to include elements of it in his later films such as The Diabolical Dr. Z (1965) while the story itself found its way into The Other Side of the Mirror (1973).

== 1970s ==
=== Juliette ===
During the development of Vampyros Lesbos (1971) and She Killed in Ecstasy (1971) Franco began developing material on a Spanish production titled Juliette. Franco stated about 40 minutes of footage of the film was shot. Franco stopped work on the project to make The Devil Came from Akasava between June 21 and July 15. During production of the film, actress Soledad Miranda was killed in a car accident on August 18, 1970.

=== Un tiro en la sién, El misterio del castillo rojo, La casa del ahorcado ===
In later November 1972 while filming in Southern Spain, Franco met actress Rosa Maria Almirall. Franco would later give her the stage name of Lina Romay and hasily developed a film with the Spanish shooting title of Un tiro en la sién transl. A Shot in the Head. Romay recalled that the film was finished, while Franco suggested the opposite.

Under a shooting title of El castillo rojo, El misterio del castillo rojo (transl. The Mystery of the Red Castle) was partially shot in May 1973. Like Un tiro en la sién, Romay has suggested the film completed shooting, while Franco stated the opposite.

La casa del ahorcado (transl. House of the Hanged) was partially shot in November 1973 during the production of Night of the Skull with the same location and actors. Actor Antonio Mayans described it as a period film. Also started but not completed in 1973 was Lascivia, which both Franco and Romay discussed in press interviews in 1974.

=== Mandinga and L'assassin portait des bas noirs ===
Shot under the title La Mindinga and proposed to be released as Mandina - Die nackte Sklavin (transl. Madgina - The Naked Slave) was partially shot in November in 1976 with continued shooting in late December continuing into January 1976. The film was going to be made by Italian production company S.E.F.I. Cinmatografica, a film with erotic overtones derived from the film Mandingo (1975). During filming, Franco and Romay had vanished from production for two weeks. Franco later stated that the budget had run out, and he went Rome to find an explanation and further funding. Other film crew around him said that Franco would often leave hotels, including his belongings to skip pay. The status of the films completion is unknown.

Along with filming Mandingo, Franco began shooting another Italian production titled L'assassin portrait des bas noirs (transl. The Killer Wore Black Stockings) in November 1975.

=== El escarabajo de oro ===
El escarabajo de oro (transl. The Gold Bug) was based on "The Gold-Bug" (1843) by Edgar Allan Poe. It was shot by Franco in Rio de Janeiro in May 1979, with further material shot in Elche in Spain in June 1979. In 2018, Álex Mendíbil discovered the negative of the film at Filmoteca Española.

== Post-1970s ==
The first film production not released by Franco was Adolescencia, a film set with Franco as director, which only appears in a 1981 Spanish production listing. No further details are known. Later in 1983, Franco shot an adventure film titled Barrio Chino (transl. China Town) in 1983 which was completed but not finished.

Between 1983 and 1986, eight films were completed by Franco but never released. These films ranged from pornography such as Teleporno Others include Barrio chino (transl. China Town) and El abuelo, la condesa y escarlata la traviesa (transl. The Grandfather, the Countess, and Scarlet the Cross) shot in 1983, Voces de muerte (transl. Voices of Death) shot in 1984, Una de chinos (transl. One of the Chinese) and La venganza del rinoceronte blanco (transl. Vengeance of the White Rhinoceros Queen) shot in 1985, Las tribulaciones de un Buda bizco (transl. Tribulations of a Cross-Eyed Buddha) and S.I.D.A. La peste del siglo veinte (transl. AIDS the Plague of the 20th Century) shot in 1986.

In the early 1990s, Franco's film work slowed down dramatically. Franco spent most of his time between 1990 and 1993 working on a version of Orson Welles' unfinished Don Quixote. Franco organized a Spanish and American co-production titled Jungle of Fear. Shot in 1993, the film was a second attempt at filming an adaptation of "The Gold-Bug". During production, funding from the United States fell through mid-way through production. Franco assembled a rough cut of the film, which is not available through official releases.

== See also ==
- Orson Welles's unrealized projects

== Bibliography ==
- "Mikaela rechaza dos películas". Primer Plano (in Spanish). October 30, 1960. p. 21.
- Cesari, Francesco; Curti, Roberto (2024). The Films of Jesus Franco, 1953-1966. McFarland & Company. ISBN 978-1-4766-9431-3.
- Petit, Alain (2015). Jess Franco, ou les prospérités du bis (in French). Alignan-du-Vent: Artus Films. ISBN 978-2-9548435-3-7.
- Thrower, Stephen (2015). Murderous Passions: The Delirious Cinema of Jesús Franco: Volume 1:1959-1974. Strange Attractor Press. ISBN 978-1-907222-31-3.
- Thrower, Stephen (2018). Flowers of Perversion: The Delirious Cinema of Jesús Franco: Volume Two. Strange Attractor Press. ISBN 978-1-907222-60-3.
