= List of Spanish films of 1971 =

A list of films produced in Spain in 1971 (see 1971 in film).

== 1971 ==
Title	Director	Cast	Genre	Notes
1971
Black Beauty	James H. Hill	Mark Lester, Uschi Glas, Walter Slezak	Adventure, family	Spanish-British-West German co-production
Canciones para después de una guerra	Basilio Martín Patino		Documentary	
The Case of the Scorpion's Tail	Sergio Martino	Evelyn Stewart, Anita Strindberg, George Hilton	Thriller	Italian-Spanish co-production
Delusions of Grandeur	Gérard Oury	Louis de Funès, Yves Montand, Alice Sapritch	Comedy	French-Italian-Spanish-West German co-production
Españolas en París	Roberto Bodegas	Ana Belén, Laura Valenzuela, Máximo Valverde, Tina Sáinz, José Sacristán	Drama	Entered into the 7th Moscow International Film Festival
Goya, a Story of Solitude	Nino Quevedo	Francisco Rabal, Irina Demick	Historical	Entered into the 1971 Cannes Film Festival
The Legend of Frenchie King	Christian-Jaque, Guy Casaril	Brigitte Bardot, Claudia Cardinale, Michael J. Pollard	Western	French-Italian-Spanish co-production
A Lizard in a Woman's Skin	Lucio Fulci	Stanley Baker, Jean Sorel, Leo Genn	Thriller	French-Italian-Spanish co-production
Marta	José Antonio Nieves Conde			
She Killed in Ecstasy	Jesús Franco	Soledad Miranda, Fred Williams, Paul Müller	Horror	
The Strange Vice of Mrs. Wardh	Sergio Martino	George Hilton, Edwige Fenech, Carlo Alighiero	Thriller	Italian-Spanish co-production
Tombs of the Blind Dead	Amando de Ossorio	Maria Silva, Simon Arriaga, Juan Cortes	Horror	Spanish-Portuguese co-production
A Town Called Hell	Robert Parrish	Telly Savalas, Martin Landau, Robert Shaw	Western	Spanish-British co-production
Vampyros Lesbos	Jesus Franco	Ewa Strömberg, Soledad Miranda, Andrés Monales	Horror	West German-Spanish co-production

== Notes ==
=== References ===
- Browning, John Edgar; Picart, Caroline Joan (2010). Dracula in Visual Media:Film, Television, Comic Book and Electronic Game Appearances, 1921-2010. McFarland. ISBN 978-0786433650.
- Shipka, Danny (2011). Perverse Titillation: The Exploitation Cinema of Italy, Spain and France, 1960-1980. McFarland. ISBN 978-0-7864-4888-3.
