= List of horror films of 1971 =

A list of horror films released in 1971.

Title	Director(s)	Cast	Country	Notes	Ref.
The Abominable Dr. Phibes	Robert Fuest	Vincent Price, Joseph Cotten, Virginia North	United Kingdom		
A Bay of Blood	Mario Bava	Claudine Auger, Luigi Pistilli, Claudio Camaso	Italy	Alternative title(s): Twitch of the Death Nerve; Carnage; Blood Bath	
Beast of the Yellow Night	Eddie Romero	John Ashley	Philippines; United States		
The Black Belly of the Tarantula	Paolo Cavara	Giancarlo Giannini, Claudine Auger, Barbara Bouchet	Italy		
Black Noon	Bernard L. Kowalski	Roy Thinnes, Yvette Mimieux, Ray Milland	United States		
Blood and Lace	Philip S. Gilbert	Gloria Grahame, Melody Patterson, Len Lesser	United States		
Blood from the Mummy's Tomb	Seth Holt	Andrew Keir, Valerie Leon, James Villiers	United Kingdom		
Blood of Ghastly Horror	Al Adamson	Regina Carrol, John Carradine, Anne Warde	United States	Re-edited version of Psycho A-Go-Go (1965)	
The Blood on Satan's Claw	Piers Haggard	Patrick Wymark, Linda Hayden, Barry Andrews	United Kingdom		
Blood Thirst	Newt Arnold	Robert Winston, Vic Diaz, Max Roio	Philippines; United States		
Brain of Blood	Al Adamson	Grant Williams, Kent Taylor	United States		
The Brotherhood of Satan	Bernard McEveety	Strother Martin, L.Q. Jones, Charles Bateman	United States		
The Cat o' Nine Tales	Dario Argento	James Franciscus, Karl Malden, Horst Frank	Italy; France		
Cauldron of Blood	Edward Mann	Boris Karloff, Viveca Lindfors	Spain	Filmed in 1967	
A Clockwork Orange	Stanley Kubrick	Malcolm McDowell, Patrick Magee, Adrienne Corri, Miriam Karlin	United Kingdom; United States		
The Corpse Grinders	Ted V. Mikels	Sean Kenney, Monika Kelly, Vincent Barbi	United States		
Countess Dracula	Peter Sasdy	Ingrid Pitt, Nigel Green, Sandor Elès	United Kingdom		
Creatures the World Forgot	Don Chaffey	Julie Ege, Tony Bonner	United Kingdom		
Crucible of Horror	Viktors Ritelis	Michael Gough	United Kingdom	Filmed in 1969 Alternative title(s): The Corpse; The Velvet House	
Crucible of Terror	Ted Hooker	Mike Raven, Mary Maude, James Bolam	United Kingdom		
The Curse of the Vampyr	José Maria Elorietta	Beatriz Lacy, Nicholas Ney, Ines Skorpio	Spain	Alternative title(s): La Llamada del Vampiro	
Daughters of Darkness	Harry Kümel	John Karlen, Delphine Seyrig, Danielle Ouimet	Belgium; France; West Germany		
The Devil's Nightmare	Jean Brismée	Erika Blanc, Jean Servais, Jacques Monseau	Belgium; Italy		
The Devils	Ken Russell	Oliver Reed, Vanessa Redgrave	United Kingdom; United States		
Die Screaming, Marianne	Pete Walker	Susan George, Barry Evans, Leo Genn	United Kingdom		
Don't Deliver Us from Evil	Joël Séria	Jeanne Goupil, Catherine Wagener, Bernard Dhéran	France		
Dr. Jekyll and Sister Hyde	Roy Ward Baker	Ralph Bates, Martine Beswick, Gerald Sim	United Kingdom		
Dracula vs. Frankenstein	Al Adamson	J. Carrol Naish, Lon Chaney Jr., Anthony Eisley	Spain; United States		
Exorcism's Daughter	Rafael Moreno Alba	Analía Gadé, Francisco Rabal, Espartaco Santoni	Spain	Alternative title(s): Las melancólicas; Women of Doom	
Feast of Satan	José María Elorrieta	Krista Nell, Espartaco Santoni, Teresa Gimpera	Spain; Italy	Alternative title(s): Las Amantes del Diablo	
Fright	Peter Collinson	Ian Bannen, Susan George, Honor Blackman	United Kingdom		
Girl Slaves of Morgana Le Fay	Bruno Gantillon	Dominique Delpierre, Mireille Saunin	France		
Hands of the Ripper	Peter Sasdy	Eric Porter, Angharad Rees, Jane Merrow	United Kingdom		
The Headless Eyes	Kent Bateman	Bo Brundin	United States		
The House That Dripped Blood	Peter Duffell	John Bennett, John Bryans, John Malcolm	United Kingdom		
A Howling in the Woods	Daniel Petrie	Barbara Eden, Larry Hagman, Larry Hagman, John Rubinstein, Vera Miles	United States	Television film	
I Eat Your Skin	Del Tenney	William Joyce, Heather Hewitt, Betty Hyatt Linton	United States		
I, Monster	Stephen Weeks	Christopher Lee, Peter Cushing, Mike Raven	United Kingdom		
Iguana With the Tongue of Fire	Riccardo Freda	Luigi Pistilli, Dagmar Lassander	Italy		
Incense for the Damned	Robert Hartford-Davis	Patrick Macnee, Peter Cushing, Edward Woodward	United Kingdom		
The Incredible 2-Headed Transplant	Anthony M. Lanza	Casey Kasem, Pat Priest, Darlene Duralia	United States		
Isle of the Snake People	Juan Ibañez, Jack Hill	Boris Karloff, Yolanda Montes, Julia Marichal	Mexico	filmed in 1968	
Lake of Dracula	Michio Yamamoto	Mori Kishida, Midori Fujita, Osahide Takahashi	Japan		
Let's Scare Jessica to Death	John D. Hancock	Zohra Lampert, Mariclare Costello	United States		
Lust for a Vampire	Jimmy Sangster	Ralph Bates, Barbara Jefford, Suzanna Leigh	United Kingdom		
Mephisto Waltz	Paul Wendkos	Alan Alda, Jacqueline Bisset, Barbara Parkins	United States		
Necromania: A Tale of Weird Love	Ed Wood	Rene Bond, Maria Arnold	United States		
Necrophagus	Miguel Madrid	Bill Curran, Beatriz Lacy, Víctor Israel	Spain	Alternative title(s): Graveyard of Horror; The Butcher of Binbrook	
The Night of the Damned	Filippo Ratti	Pierre Brice, Patrizia Viotti, Angelo de Leo	Italy		
Night of Dark Shadows	Dan Curtis	David Selby, Grayson Hall, Kate Jackson	United States		
The Night Digger	Alastair Reid	Patricia Neal, Pamela Brown	United Kingdom		
The Night Evelyn Came Out of the Grave	Emilio Miraglia	Anthony Steffen, Marina Malfatti, Erika Blanc	Italy		
The Night God Screamed	Lee Madden	Jeanne Crain, Alex Nicol	United States		
The Nightcomers	Michael Winner	Marlon Brando, Stephanie Beacham, Thora Hird	United States		
Octaman	Harry Essex	Pier Angeli, Wally Rose, Kerwin Mathews	United States; Mexico		
Paper Man	Walter Grauman	Dean Stockwell, Stefanie Powers, James Stacy	United States	Television film	
Play Misty for Me	Clint Eastwood	Clint Eastwood, Jessica Walter, Donna Mills, John Larch	United States		
Queens of Evil	Tonino Cervi	Haydée Politoff, Ray Lovelock, Ida Galli	Italy; France		
Requiem for a Vampire	Jean Rollin	Marie-Pierre Castel, Mireille Dargent, Philippe Gasté	France	Alternative title(s): Caged Virgins	
The Return of Count Yorga	Bob Kelljan	Robert Quarry, Mariette Hartley, Roger Perry	United States		
The Sadist with Red Teeth	Jean-Louis van Belle	Albert Simono	France		
See No Evil	Richard Fleischer	Mia Farrow, Dorothy Allison	United Kingdom	Alternative title(s): Blind Terror	
Seven Murders for Scotland Yard	José Luis Madrid	Paul Naschy, Patricia Loran, Renzo Marignano	Spain; Italy	Alternative title(s): Jack the Ripper of London	
She Killed in Ecstasy	Jesús Franco	Soledad Miranda, Fred Williams, Howard Vernon	West Germany; Spain		
The Shiver of the Vampires	Jean Rollin	Sandra Julien, Jean-Marie Durand, Marie-Pierre Castel	France		
Short Night of Glass Dolls	Aldo Lado	Ingrid Thulin, Mario Adorf, Barbara Bach	Italy		
Simon, King of the Witches	Bruce Kessler	Andrew Prine, Brenda Scott	United States		
Slaughter Hotel	Fernando Di Leo	Klaus Kinski	Italy	Alternative title(s): The Beast Kills in Cold Blood	
Sometimes Aunt Martha Does Dreadful Things	Thomas Casey	Abe Zwick, Wayne Crawford	United States		
They Have Changed Their Face	Corrado Farina	Adolfo Celi, Geraldine Hooper, Giuliano Disperati	Italy		
Tombs of the Blind Dead	Amando de Ossorio	Lone Fleming, César Burner, María Elena Arpón	Spain; Portugal		
The Touch of Satan	Bruce Kessler	Michael Berry, Emby Mellay	United States		
Twins of Evil	John Hough	Peter Cushing, Harvey Hall, Luan Peters	United Kingdom		
The Vampire Happening	Freddie Francis	Pia Degermark, Thomas Hunter, Yvor Murillo	West Germany		
Vampyros Lesbos	Jesús Franco	Ewa Strömberg, Soledad Miranda, Andrés Monales	West Germany; Spain		
The Velvet Vampire	Stephanie Rothman	Celeste Yarnall, Michael Blodgett, Sherry Miles	United States		
Venom	Peter Sykes	Simon Brent, Neda Arnerić, Derek Newar	United States		
Virgin Witch	Ray Austin	Ann Michelle, Vicki Michelle	United Kingdom		
Web of the Spider	Antonio Margheriti	Anthony Franciosa, Michèle Mercier, Klaus Kinski	Italy; West Germany; France		
Werewolves on Wheels	Michel Levesque	Stephen Oliver, D. J. Anderson, Gene Shane	United States		
What the Peeper Saw	James Kelley	Mark Lester, Britt Ekland, Hardy Krüger	United Kingdom	Alternative title(s): Night Hair Child	
What's the Matter with Helen?	Curtis Harrington	Debbie Reynolds, Shelley Winters, Dennis Weaver	United States		
Whoever Slew Auntie Roo?	Curtis Harrington	Shelley Winters, Mark Lester, Ralph Richardson	United Kingdom; United States		
Willard	Daniel Mann	Bruce Davison, Ernest Borgnine, Elsa Lanchester	United States		
Zaat	Don Barton, Arnold Stevens	Marshall Grauer, Sanna Ringhaver, Wade Popwell	United States	Alternative title(s): Blood Waters of Dr. Z	

== Sources ==
- Albright, Brian (2012). Regional Horror Films, 1958-1990: A State-by-State Guide with Interviews. Jefferson, North Carolina: McFarland. ISBN 978-1-476-60042-0.
- Browning, John Edgar (2010). Dracula in Visual Media: Film, Television, Comic Book and Electronic Game Appearances, 1921–2010. McFarland. ISBN 978-0-7864-3365-0.
- Chibnall, Steve; Petley, Julian, eds. (2002). British Horror Cinema. New York City, New York: Routledge. ISBN 978-0-415-23003-2.
- Deal, David (2007). Television Fright Films of the 1970s. Jefferson, North Carolina: McFarland. ISBN 978-0-786-42929-5.
- Hardy, Phil, ed. (1995). The Overlook Film Encyclopedia. Vol. 3. Overlook Press. ISBN 0-87951-624-0.
- Hirschhorn, Clive (2000). The Universal Story. London, England: Hamlyn. ISBN 978-0-600-59736-0.
- Hutchings, Peter (2009). The A to Z of Horror Cinema. Lanham, Maryland: Scarecrow Press. ISBN 978-0-810-87050-5.
- Meyers, Ric (2011) [1983]. For One Week Only: The World of Exploitation Films. Guildford, Connecticut: Emery Books. ISBN 978-0-979-99893-5.
- Muir, John Kenneth (2007). Horror Films of the 1970s. Jefferson, North Carolina: McFarland. ISBN 978-0-786-49156-8.
- Stine, Scott Aaron (2015). The Gorehound's Guide to Splatter Films of the 1960s and 1970s. Jefferson, North Carolina: McFarland. ISBN 978-0-786-49140-7.
- Young, R. G. (2000). The Encyclopedia of Fantastic Film: Ali Baba to Zombies. New York City, New York: Hal Leonard Corporation. ISBN 1-55783-269-2.
