= List of Spanish films of 1972 =

A list of films produced in Spain in 1972 (see 1972 in film).

== 1972 ==
Title	Director	Cast	Genre	Notes
The Deadly Avenger of Soho	Jesús Franco	Horst Tappert, Fred Williams, Barbara Rütting	Crime	Co-production with West Germany
Dr. Jekyll y el Hombre Lobo	León Klimovsky	Jacinto Molina	Horror	
His Name Was Holy Ghost/...Y le llamaban El Halcón	Giuliano Carnimeo	Gianni Garko, Pilar Velázquez	Spaghetti western	
Horror Express/Pánico en el Transiberiano	Eugenio Martín	Christopher Lee, Peter Cushing, Telly Savalas	Sci-fi, Horror	
A House Without Boundaries	Pedro Olea			Entered into the 22nd Berlin International Film Festival
Mi querida señorita	Jaime de Armiñan	José Luis López Vázquez, Julieta Serrano	Drama	Academy Award nominee
Tombs of the Blind Dead	Amando de Ossorio	Lone Fleming, Cesar Burner	Horror	Spanish\Portuguese co-production
The Vengeance of Dr. Mabuse	Jesús Franco	Fred Williams, Ewa Strömberg, Jack Taylor	—N/a	Spanish-West German co-production
The Witches Mountain	Raúl Artigot	Patty Shepard, Mónica Randall, Cihangir Ghaffari	Horror	
