= She Killed in Ecstasy =

1971 film

- Directed by: Jesús Franco
- Written by: Jesús Franco
- Produced by: Artur Brauner
- Starring: Soledad Miranda; Fred Williams
- Cinematography: Manuel Merino
- Edited by: Clarissa Ambach
- Music by: Manfred Hübler; Siegfried Schwab
- Production companies: Telecine Film; Fernsehproduktion GmbH; Fénix Films
- Distributed by: Cinerama Filmgesellschaf
- Release date: December 10, 1971 (Germany)
- Running time: 77 minutes
- Countries: West Germany; Spain
- Language: German

She Killed in Ecstasy (German: Sie tötete in Ekstase Spanish: Mrs. Hyde) is a 1971 West German-Spanish erotic thriller film directed by Jesús Franco. The film's plot borrows elements from previous Franco films Miss Muerte and Venus in Furs. The film's productions staff includes many cast members and nearly the same crew as his previous film Vampyros Lesbos.

== Plot ==
Dr. Johnson lives in bliss with his beautiful wife until his unorthodox experiments with human embryos causes a medical committee to reject his findings and order him to discontinue his work. The unstable doctor slashes his wrists in the bathroom. Devastated, his wife vows to seduce and kill the woman and three men "responsible" for the suicide.

== Cast ==
- Soledad Miranda as Mrs. Johnson (as Susann Korda)
- Fred Williams as Dr. Johnson
- Ewa Strömberg as Dr. Crawford (as Ewa Stroemberg)
- Paul Muller as Dr. Franklin Houston (as Paul Müller)
- Howard Vernon as Prof. Jonathan Walker
- Horst Tappert as Police Inspector
- Jesús Franco as Dr. Donen (uncredited)
- Rudolph Hertzog Jr. as Congress participant (uncredited)
- Karl-Heinz Mannchen as Congress participant (uncredited)

== Production ==
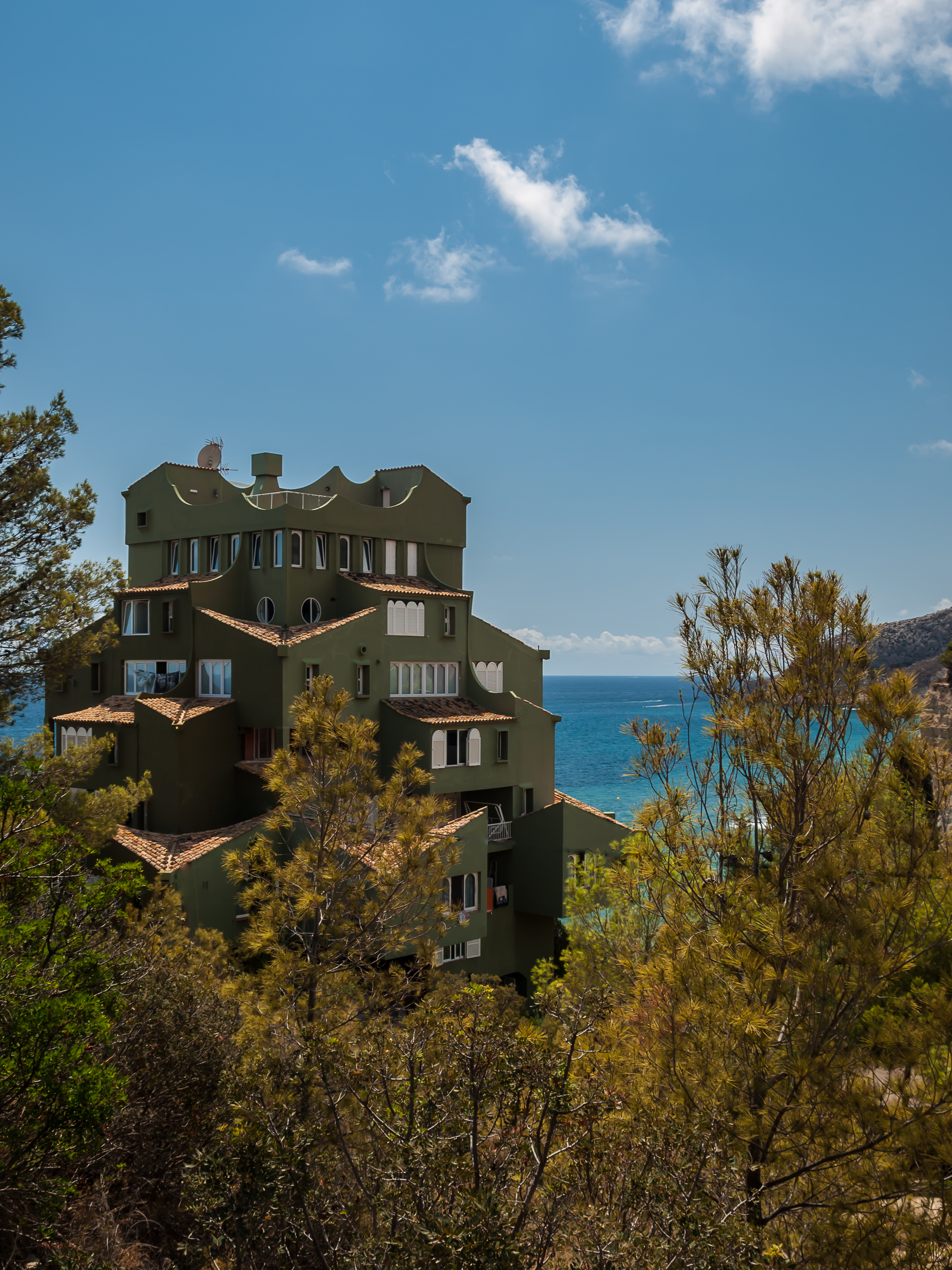
Xanadu in Calp, where Mrs. Johnson lives

The film was shot in July 1970 in Calp, Spain, less than a month after finishing his previous film Vampyros Lesbos (1971) and a month before Miranda's death. Franco utilized the same cinematographer, film editor, and film composers as he had on Vampyros Lesbos as well as some of the cast including Soledad Miranda, Ewa Strömberg and Paul Muller.

The architecture of Ricardo Bofill features prominently in the film, in particular Xanadu.

The film re-uses plot elements from Franco's previous films Miss Muerte and Venus in Furs (1969).

== Release ==
She Killed in Escstacy was released on December 10, 1971, in Germany.

The film was released on DVD in the United States by Synapse Films in 2000. It was subsequently re-released by Image Entertainment in 2004. Both versions are currently out of print.

Severin Films released the film on April 14, 2015, for the first time on Blu-ray in the United States.

== Reception ==
The online film database Allmovie gave the film their lowest rating of one star out of five, but noted that "A distinctive visual style, replete with surrealistic photography by Manuel Merino, sets this film apart from scores of similar sex-horror entries flooding the market in the early 1970s." Assistant professor Danny Shipka of Louisiana State University referred to the film as "one of Franco's strongest of the 70's", praising actress Soledad Miranda for the "most intense performance of her career". Shipka went on to note that the film contains all the excesses of Franco's filmmaking including "stilted dialogue" and "scenes that stretch out for extra ordinary periods of time".

== See also ==
- Spanish films of 1971
- List of horror films of 1971
- List of German films: 1970s

== Notes ==
=== References ===
- Shipka, Danny (2011). Perverse Titillation: The Exploitation Cinema of Italy, Spain and France, 1960–1980. McFarland. ISBN 978-0-7864-4888-3.
