= Lucky, the Inscrutable =

1967 film

- Directed by: Jesús Franco
- Screenplay by: José Luis Martínez Mollá; Julio Buchs; Remigio Del Grosso; Jesús Franco
- Story by: José Luis Martínez Mollá; Julio Buchs
- Produced by: Artur Brauner
- Starring: Ray Danton; Dieter Eppler; Rosalba Neri
- Cinematography: Fulvio Testi
- Edited by: Antonietta Zita
- Music by: Bruno Nicolai
- Production companies: Atlántida Films; Dauro Film; Fono Roma; Explorer Films 58; CCC Filmkunst; Telecine Film - und Fernsehproduktion GmbH
- Distributed by: Iberica Films (Spain); Rank Film (Italy); Eckelkamp Verleihgesellschaft (Dusseldorf)
- Release dates: 23 June 1967 (Italy); 1 September 1967 (West Germany); 18 December 1967 (Seville)
- Countries: Italy; Spain; West Germany

Lucky, the Inscrutable (Italian: Agente speciale L.K.: Operazione Re Mida, Spanish: Lucky, el intrépido, German: Lucky M. füllt alle Särge) is a 1967 spy film directed by Jesús Franco and starring Ray Danton.

== Cast ==
- Ray Danton as Lucky
- Barbara Bold as Brunehilde
- Dante Posani as Michele
- Dieter Eppler as Hans
- Marcelo Arroita-Jáuregui as Gafas de Oro
- María Luisa Ponte as Madame Linda
- Rosalba Neri as Yaka
- Beba Lončar as Beba
- Teresa Gimpera as Cleopatra
- Patty Shepard as telephonist
- Jesús Franco 3 cameos (as Man on Train/ guitar player/ blind man)

== Production ==
During the 1960s, the Spanish film industry was regularly making co-production with Italy. For Lucky, the Inscrutable, the film was primarily funded by Italy. Franco biographer Stephen Thrower stated that between 1964, and 1967 film studios from Rome would release a cavalcade of James Bond parodies. Lucky, the Inscrutable was among them.

It was also Italian actress Rosalba Neri's first Franco film.

The film was shot on location in Rome and Spain, with studio filming done in Rome between October and November 1966.

== Release ==
Lucky, the Inscrutable was released in Italy on 23 June 1967 with a 92 minute running time as Agente Speciale L.K. (Operazione Re Mida). It was later released in West Germany on 1 September 1967 as Lucky M. fiillt alle Sarge (transl. Lucky M. FIlls All the Coffins) at 88 minutes. It was later shown in Seville in Spain on 18 December 1967 as Lucky el intrépido transl. Lucky the Intrepid with a 91 minute running time.

== Reception ==
Spanish newspaper ABC Andalucia wrote that the humorous and serious scenes lacked proper coordination, but that "In the absence of more singular technical and artistic values, perhaps the best aspects of the film are the splendid photography and the catchy background music by Bruno Nicolai"

== Legacy ==
The film was the first collaboration between Jesús Franco and film composer Bruno Nicolai. They would collaborate on several of Franco's films in the future, such as Count Dracula (1970), Nightmares Come at Night (1973), and A Virgin Among the Living Dead (1973) among several others.

This film was Franco's first Spanish-Italian-German co-production, and was also his first film for German producer Artur Brauner Franco would continue work with Brauner and German company CCC Filmkunst, creating six films a two year-period.
