= The Vengeance of Dr. Mabuse =

- Spanish poster
- Directed by: Jesús Franco
- Screenplay by: Jesús Franco; Artur Brauner
- Story by: Jesús Franco
- Starring: Fred Williams; Ewa Strömberg; Jack Taylor
- Cinematography: Manuel Merino
- Production companies: Cooperativa Fénix Films; Copercines; Tele-Cine Film-und Fernsehproduktion
- Distributed by: Rosa Films (Barcelona); CCC Filmkunst GmbH (Berlin)
- Release dates: 26 December 1972 (Berlin); 18 November 1974 (Barcelona)
- Running time: 88 minutes
- Countries: Spain; West Germany

The Vengeance of Dr. Mabuse (La venganza del Doctor Mabuse) is a 1972 film directed by Jesús Franco. The film is about the character Dr. Mabuse, a who is plotting a comeback from his secret base in the United States. Mabuse has learned how to control the minds of others through a form of radiation emitted by samples of moon rocks.

The film is a Spanish and German co-production between Cooperativa Fénix Films and Copercines which were both based in Madrid and Tele-Cine Film-und Fernsehproduktion. It was based on the character Dr. Mabuse created by Norbert Jacques and adapted into film in the 1920s by Fritz Lang. The Dr. Mabuse films returned in the 1960s from producer Artur Brauner who made six films. This was the first film Dr. Mabuse produced since 1964. It would be the last film Brauner and actor Ewa Strömberg would make with Franco. It was released in very different forms theatrically in Spain and West Germany.

The film received a bad review in ABC Andalucia in Spain on its release.

== Cast ==
Cast adapted from Murderous Passions: The Delirious Cinema of Jesús Franco: Volume 1:1959-1974.

- Fred Williams as Sheriff Bromer Thomas
- Ewa Strömberg as Jennifer Paganini
- Jack Taylor as Dr. Cranko (in the German version) and Dr. Mabuse and Professor Farkas (in the Spanish version)
- Roberto Camardiel as Sultan
- Moisés Augusto Rocha as Andros, the monster
- Gustavo Re as Malout
- Eva Garden as Wanda Orloff
- Angel Menéndez as Professor Parkinson

== Production ==
The Vengeance of Dr. Mabuse was a Spanish and West German co-production between Cooperativa Fénix Films and Copercines which were both based in Madrid and Tele-Cine Film-und Fernsehproduktion which was based in Berlin. The film features the character Dr. Mabuse, who was created by Norbert Jacques in his novels and then adapted to film by Fritz Lang in Dr. Mabuse the Gambler (1922) and The Testament of Dr. Mabuse (1933). The character was later re-introduced into films by producer Artur Brauner who made six films: starting with The 1,000 Eyes of Dr. Mabuse (1960) and the final films with The Secret of Dr. Mabuse (1964). Brauner had not made a Dr. Mabuse films in seven years at the time of The Vengeance of Dr. Mabuse. According to Franco, Brauner gave him the script. Franco would re-write the script. Franco's film is not similar to any previous Dr. Mabuse films, with its narrative generally following the same plot as Franco's previous film, The Awful Dr. Orloff (1962). Franco would redo the plot of that film throughout his career. In his book The Strange Case of Dr. Mabuse (2005), David Kalat described that Franco's film copies his 1962 film "down to the tiniest detail".

The film was shot between February 25 and March 12, 1971, right after production had completed on The Deadly Avenger of Soho (1972). The film was shot on location in Spain between La Manga del Mar Menor and Alicante. It was the final film director Jesus Franco made from his partnership with producer Artur Brauner that began with Vampyros Lesbos (1971). Franco made four films for Brauner's various production companies in 1971 but did not have them ready for the producer until 1972, a delay that infuriated led to Brauner ending their business association. Franco described Brauner as "a curious mixture of a producer-creator on the one hand and a cheap filmmaker on the other, he is very clever and his great knowledge of actors, editing and sound. He never came to the shooting of any of our films, thought. He was never interested in the shooting." The film was the last of five films actress Ewa Strömberg made with Franco.

== Release ==
The Vengeance of Dr. Mabuse was distributed in Berlin on December 26, 1972, by CCC Filmkunst GmbH under the title Der Mann, der sich Mabuse nannte (transl. The Man Who Called Himself Mabuse). It was later reissued under the title Dr. M schlagt zu (transl. Dr. M Strikes Back). This was followed by screenings in Barcelona on November 18, 1974, and Seville on August 29, 1975. In Spain, it had a total of 153,387 admissions.

In West Germany, the film ran at an 88-minute running time, while in Spain it had a 97-minute running time. The Spanish and German video releases are substantially different from one another, with alterations ranging from dialogue changes to new scenes and re-sequencing of the film. The Spanish video of had a 64-minute run time while the German video was just over 75 minutes, both distinctly shorter than the Spanish theatrical cut. Kino Lorber released the film on Blu-ray on August 19, 2025. This release only included the German cut of the film with a 76-minute running time.

== Reception ==
From contemporary reviews, ABC Andalucia found that despite an interesting subject, it had poor performances and that the film constantly used static characters and unattractive close-ups concluding the film was a poor treatment of the subject.

From retrospective reviews, Franco biographer Stephen Thrower found the film seemed "a trifle threadbare" compared to the Lang directed Mabuse films, finding the 1972 film "a piece of amusing gibberish" with Franco's "customary flair for marvelous locations and interiors"

== Legacy ==
Franco reflected on the film, saying he was "only sorry that we didn't have more money for the laboratory set [...] It was a nice film, I think, even if it wasn't a gothic Mabuse."

Brauner was dealt with a court proceedings in the 1990s over The Vengeance of Dr. Mabuse on whether or not Franco's film was a Mabuse film as he would have breached his contract if he was directly involved with the production as he was potentially avoiding paying the heirs of Norbert Jacques. Brauner won the case.

== See also ==
- List of German films of the 1970s
- List of Spanish films of 1972
