= Pyro... The Thing Without a Face =

1964 film by Julio Coll

Pyro... the Thing Without a Face
- Theatrical release poster
- Directed by: Julio Coll
- Written by: Sidney W. Pink
- Produced by: Sidney W. Pink; Richard C. Meyer
- Starring: Barry Sullivan; Martha Hyer; Soledad Miranda; Luis Prendes
- Cinematography: Manuel Berenguer
- Edited by: Margarita de Ochoa
- Music by: José Solá
- Production companies: S.W.P. Productions; Esamer Films
- Distributed by: American International Pictures (US)
- Release dates: 22 January 1964 (United States); 6 March 1964 (Spain)
- Running time: 90 minutes (Spanish version); 99 minutes (United States version)
- Countries: United States; Spain
- Language: English

Pyro... The Thing Without a Face (also known as Wheel of Fire) is a 1964 American horror film directed by Julio Coll.

== Plot ==
Vance Pierson is an engineer with a wife and daughter, who is having an affair with a widow, Laura. He wants to end the affair but Laura gets upset and sets the family home on fire. The fire kills Vance's family and disfigures him. He seeks revenge on his former mistress.

== Cast ==
- Barry Sullivan as Vance Pierson
- Martha Hyer as Laura Blanco
- Sherry Moreland as Verna Pierson
- Luis Prendes as Police Inspector
- Fernando Hilbeck as Julio
- Soledad Miranda as Liz Frade

== Release ==
=== Home media ===
The film was released for the first time on DVD by Troma on February 27, 2001.

== Reception ==
TV Guide awarded the film 2/5 stars, criticizing the film's script, dialogue, and over focus on the affair between Hyer and Sullivan. However, they did commend the film's make-up effects, and predictable but well handled ending. On his website Fantastic Movie Musings and Ramblings, Dave Sindelar noted that the film was obvious and straightforward, but commended the film's attention to detail, and strong performances.
