= Cervantes (film) =

1967 film directed by Vincent Sherman

- US film poster
- Directed by: Vincent Sherman
- Written by: Enrico Bomba (uncredited)
- Based on: A Man Called Cervantes by Bruno Frank
- Produced by: Alexander Salkind; Pier Luigi Torri
- Starring: Horst Buchholz; Gina Lollobrigida; José Ferrer; Francisco Rabal; Louis Jourdan; Fernando Rey
- Cinematography: Edmond Richard
- Edited by: Margarita de Ochoa
- Music by: Jean Ledrut; Ángel Arteaga; Les Baxter (US version)
- Production companies: Procinex; Prisma de Cinematografía; Protor Film
- Distributed by: Lux Compagnie Cinématographique de France; Constantin Film
- Release date: 3 November 1967
- Running time: 111 minutes
- Countries: Spain; France; Italy
- Language: English

Cervantes is a highly fictionalized 1967 Franco-Spanish-Italian international co-production film biography depicting the early life of Miguel de Cervantes (1547–1616). Based on the 1937 novel A Man Called Cervantes by Bruno Frank, it was the first screen biography of the author. Directed by Vincent Sherman and filmed in color, it stars Horst Buchholz as Cervantes, Gina Lollobrigida as a prostitute with whom he becomes involved, José Ferrer as Hassan Bey, the Turk who held Cervantes in captivity, Louis Jourdan as Cardinal Giulio Acquaviva, and Fernando Rey as King Philip II. Italian actor Tiziano Cortini, who usually used the name "Lewis Jordan," appeared under his own name to avoid confusion with Louis Jourdan. Enrique Alarcón handled the production design.

== Plot ==
During the 16th century, we follow the adventures and romances of the young and passionate Miguel de Cervantes, who would later become the author of Don Quixote. From his clashes with Cardinal Giulio Acquaviva and Ottoman Hassan Bey, to his alliance with Pope Pius IV, his tumultuous love affair with the beautiful Roman courtesan Giulia Toffoli, his involvement in battles alongside Philip II of Spain against the Moors, and his bravery in the naval battle of Lepanto where he lost the use of his left arm, to his capture by pirates alongside his brother Rodrigo and their imprisonment in Algiers by Hassan Bey.

Miguel gains a significant reputation for his military exploits, and while in captivity, he meets Nessa, a young girl who inspires the character of Dulcinea del Toboso. Hassan Bey seeks to profit from the release of the brothers by demanding ransom from their family and the King of Spain. During negotiations, Hassan Bey enslaves the brothers, but Miguel incites a rebellion, leading to his torture and death sentence. Fortunately, the ransom is paid before his execution, and Hassan Bey releases the Cervantes brothers, allowing them to return home.

== Cast ==
- Horst Buchholz as Miguel de Cervantes
- Gina Lollobrigida as Giulia
- José Ferrer as Hassan Bey
- Louis Jourdan as Cardinal Acquaviva
- Francisco Rabal as Rodrigo Cervantes
- Antonio Casas as Favio
- Soledad Miranda as Nessa
- Ángel del Pozo as Don Juan de Austria
- Ricardo Palacios as Sancho
- Maurice de Canonge
- Tiziano Cortini
- José Nieto as Minister of Philip II of Spain
- Andrés Mejuto as Cervantes' Father

== Production ==
Filming began in 1966, and the movie was released in several countries between 1967 and 1969.

== Reception ==
Released in the U.S. as a B-movie, and retitled Young Rebel, the film went unnoticed at the box office and did not do well critically.

The Radio Times Guide to Films' review of Cervantes gave the film two stars out of five. It described the film as a "dismal European co-production, which doesn't seem to bear much relation to the life of the famous Spanish writer."
