= Vampyros Lesbos =

1971 film by Jesús Franco

- West German theatrical release poster
- Directed by: Franco Manera
- Written by: Franco Manera; Jaime Chávarri (Note: Spanish version)
- Produced by: Karl Heinz Mannchen; Artur Brauner (uncredited)
- Starring: Susann Korda; Dennis Price; Ewa Stroemberg; Heidrun Kussin; Paul Müller; Viktor Feldmann; Michael Berling
- Cinematography: Manuel Merino
- Edited by: Clarissa Ambach
- Music by: Manfred Hübler; Siegfried Schwab; David Kunne
- Production companies: Telecine Film; Fénix Films
- Release dates: 15 July 1971 (Germany); 1973 (Spain)
- Running time: 89 minutes
- Countries: West Germany; Spain
- Language: German

Vampyros Lesbos (Spanish: Las Vampiras) is a 1971 erotic horror film written and directed by Jesús Franco (credited as Franco Manera). The film stars Ewa Strömberg as Linda Westinghouse, an American who works in a Turkish legal firm. Westinghouse has a series of erotic dreams that involve a mysterious vampire woman (played by Soledad Miranda, credited as Susann Korda) who seduces her before feeding on her blood. When she travels to an island to settle an inheritance, Linda recognizes a woman as the vampire from her dreams.

The film was shot in 1970 in Turkey. It was a popular success in theaters in Europe on its release and was the first film to have a more psychedelic score for a Franco film and the first to have a prominent lesbian theme. The film's score became popular in the mid-1990s when it was included on the compilation album Vampyros Lesbos: Sexadelic Dance Party, which reached the top ten on the British Alternative charts.

== Plot ==
Linda Westinghouse, a young American lawyer working for a law firm in Istanbul, has been having erotic dreams about a beautiful young woman every night. At a nightclub with her boyfriend Omar, Linda sees the mysterious woman from her dreams for the first time performing an exotic dance. The next day, Linda tells her psychiatrist, Dr. Steiner, that these dreams evoke both fear and arousal in her; he concludes that she is sexually frustrated and advises her to find herself a more satisfying lover.

Linda is sent to the peninsula of Anatolia, where she is set to travel to the Kadidados Islands to handle the inheritance of Countess Nadine Carody. At Linda's stopover, the hotel porter, Memmet, warns her not to go to the island, claiming it is "a place of insanity and death". Linda follows Memmet to the wine cellar, but flees after catching him torturing a young woman. Linda arrives at Nadine's beach house, realizing she is the woman from her dreams. Nadine explains that she has inherited the estate of Count Dracula. When Linda begins to feel dizzy after drinking red wine, Nadine takes her to a room where the two have sex, and Nadine draws blood from Linda's neck. Linda later awakens to find Nadine motionless in a swimming pool and faints.

The next day, Linda awakens at Dr. Alwin Seward's private clinic with no memory of her encounter with Nadine. Meanwhile, one of Dr. Seward's patients, Agra, is having a psychotic episode, claiming to have visions of Nadine. At Nadine's mansion in Istanbul, she recounts to her manservant Morpho that centuries earlier, she was attacked and raped by soldiers in her native Hungary, before she was rescued and then sired by Count Dracula, leading her to hate men. She also expresses her desire to turn Linda into a vampire. Nadine uses her powers to compel Linda to go to her mansion, where the two drink blood and have sex. Back at the clinic, Dr. Seward informs Linda that to break free from a vampire's curse, she must split the vampire's head with an axe or pierce it with a pole.

Memmet kidnaps Linda. When Nadine arrives at the clinic looking for Linda, she meets Dr. Seward, who admits that he had been waiting for Nadine's arrival so she can turn him into a vampire. Nadine refuses and has Morpho kill him. She then visits Agra's room and bids her goodbye. While Omar enlists Dr. Steiner's help in locating Linda, Memmet holds her captive and reveals that his wife, Agra, became insane after meeting Nadine on the island. Linda kills Memmet and escapes. Omar and Dr. Steiner go to Nadine's mansion, but she and Morpho have returned to her beach house in Anatolia.

Linda runs back to the beach house and finds Nadine lying in bed, dying. Nadine begs Linda for some blood, but Linda, determined to break free from Nadine's curse, bites her neck and stabs her through the eye with a pole. Distraught over Nadine's death, Morpho kills himself. Linda is found by Omar and Dr. Steiner, and Omar tries to convince her that everything she experienced was a dream, but Linda knows this is not the case.

== Cast ==
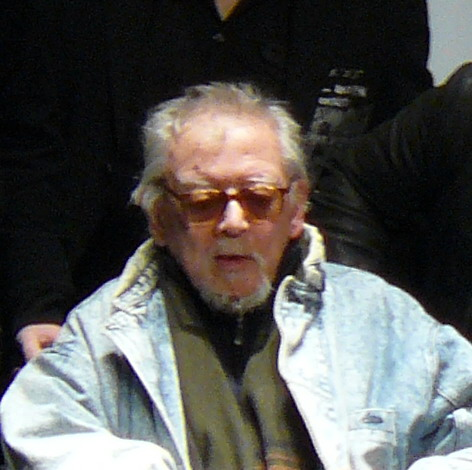
Jesús Franco (pictured) had an uncredited role in the film as Memmet.

- Soledad Miranda (credited as Susann Korda) as Countess Nadine Carody
- Dennis Price as Dr. Alwin Seward
- Paul Müller as Dr. Steiner
- Ewa Strömberg (credited as Ewa Stroemberg) as Linda Westinghouse
- Heidrun Kussin as Agra
- Michael Berling as Dr. Seward's assistant
- Andrea Montchal (credited as Viktor Feldmann) as Omar
- Beni Cardoso as dead woman (uncredited)
- Jesús Franco as Memmet (uncredited)
- José Martínez Blanco as Morpho (uncredited)

== Production ==
Vampyros Lesbos was filmed in Turkey between 1 June and 10 July 1970. While Franco used several film devices from his previous film, such as long strip club sequences and female protagonists, the lesbian subtext was more prominent in this film than in any of his previous work. The music score also differs from the jazz soundtracks of his previous films with a more psychedelic music-influenced soundtrack. The soundtrack was composed by Manfred Hübler, Siegfried Schwab and Jesús Franco who credited himself under the alias of David Khune. The film went under several titles before being released as Vampyros Lesbos including Das Mal des Vampirs (Evil of the Vampires) and Im Zeichen der Vampire (Mark of the Vampire). Less than a month after finishing production on Vampyros Lesbos, Franco began working on his next film, She Killed in Ecstasy (1971).

== Release ==
Vampyros Lesbos was released on July 15, 1971, in Germany and in Spain in 1973 where it was a popular with audiences in Europe. The film was released on DVD by Synapse Video on 4 January 2000. Image Entertainment released the film on 27 December 2000 on DVD. It was released as a set by Severin Films in 2015 containing a high-definition Blu-ray and a DVD with a Spanish bootleg of the film.

A remake of Vampyros Lesbos directed by Matthew Saliba was released in 2008. The film follows the story of Franco's film.

== Reception ==
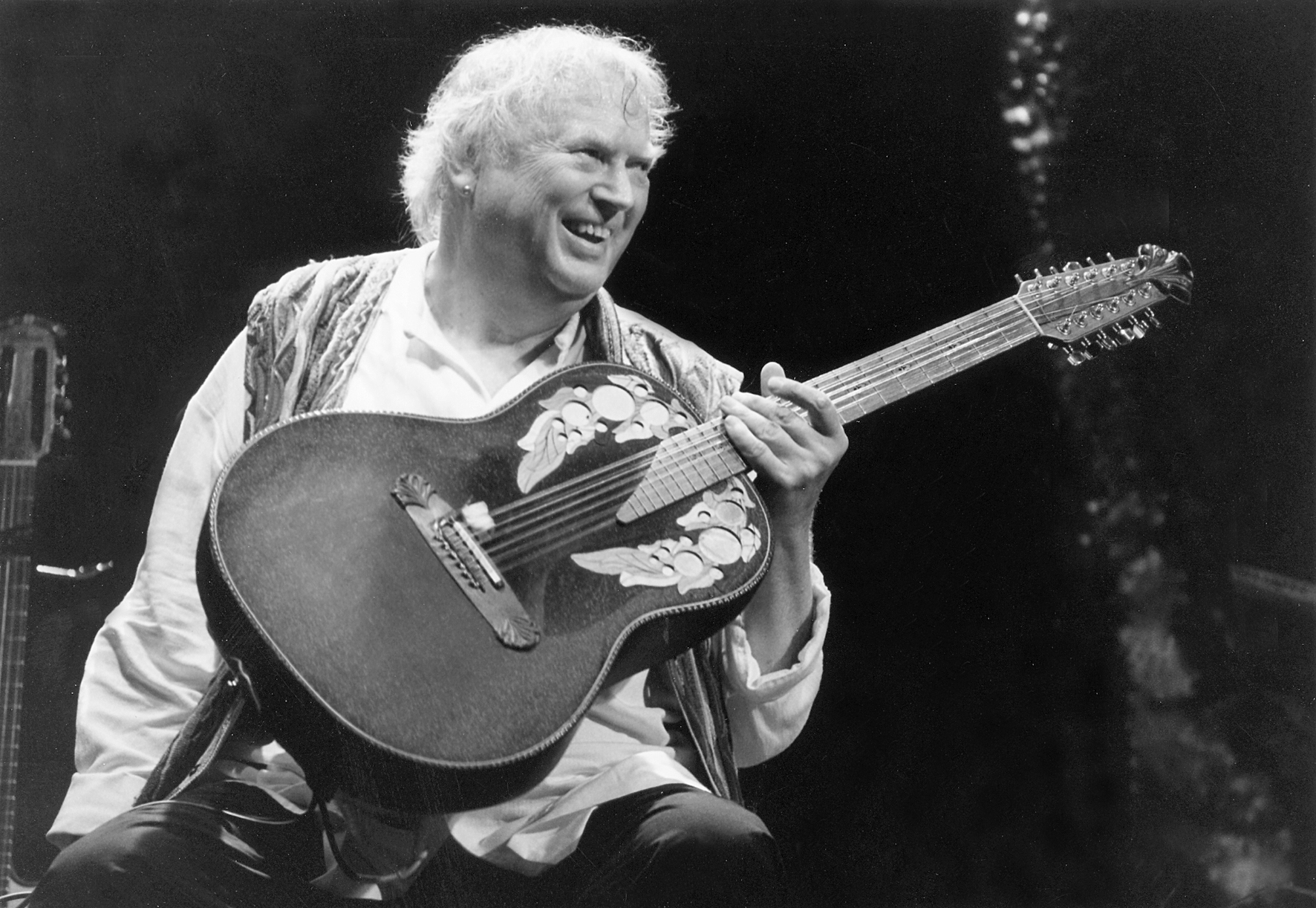
Critics praised the film for its score made by Siegfried Schwab (pictured), Manfred Hübler and Jesús Franco.

Total Film gave the film three stars out of five, noting that "Despite (or perhaps because of) the hilariously leaden acting, dull script and amateurish direction, this film still exerts a certain fascination." Jonathan Rosenbaum of The Chicago Reader gave the film a negative review, comparing director Jesús Franco to Ed Wood. The website Slant Magazine gave the film a positive review of three and half stars out of four, finding the film "effortlessly dreamlike" as well as praising the soundtrack. Film4 gave the film a mixed review, noting that "you never come to Franco's films (over 150 of them) for the plots, but his dreamy, unsettling direction does develop the central tragedy of Carody's love for Westinghouse." as well as praising the film's soundtrack. The Dissolve, an online magazine, gave the film a three out of five star rating, find that large portions of the film "lapse into tedium, whether they're extensive love scenes or, worse, the blatherings of serious men with "Dr." before their names" as well as that the film "gave exploitation audiences something different, a mesmeric vibe" which originated from the film's score and the presence of Soledad Miranda.

In his 2009 book The Pleasure and Pain of Cult Horror Films: An Historical Survey, Bartomiej Paszylk took umbrage with some of the high-brow critics of the film, though ultimately acquiescing to its shortcomings, "Truth be told, Franco's vampyros are far more interested in being lesbos than in drinking human blood, but the movie is so mesmerizing and so outright sexy that you really shouldn't mind that.

== Soundtrack ==
Vampyros Lesbos: Sexadelic Dance Party

Soundtrack album
- Released: 1995
- Recorded: 1969
- Genres: Psychedelic pop; raga rock
- Length: 48:46
- Label: Motel

The compilation album Vampyros Lesbos: Sexadelic Dance Party was released on compact disc in 1995 by Motel Records, consisting of music that was first released in 1969 on the albums Psychedelic Dance Party (released under the name the Vampires' Sound Incorporation) and Sexedelic (released under the name Sexedelic). Franco repurposed music from these albums as the soundtracks for three of his films: Vampyros Lesbos, She Killed in Ecstasy and The Devil Came from Akasava. The 1995 compilation was released during a period where there was a resurgence of interest in space age pop music, a style focused on easy listening music from the 1950s and 1960s. The track "The Lions and the Cucumber" from the album was later used again on the soundtrack of Jackie Brown by American director Quentin Tarantino, as well as in season three of The L Word (episode "Lifeline"). The album is dedicated to actress Soledad Miranda.

The soundtrack was a top 10 hit on the British Alternative charts on its release over 20 years after the film was released. On September 29, 1997, a remix album titled The Spirit of Vampyros Lesbos was released. The album was a collection of remixes from various electronic artists including Two Lone Swordsmen, Cristian Vogel and Alec Empire who released their own mixes of the film's soundtrack.

AllMusic gave the album a rating of three stars out of five, referring to the album's music as "excruciating", noting as well that a track on the album is "built on a shameless ripoff of the "Satisfaction" guitar riff". Entertainment Weekly gave the album a B+ rating, opining that it was "not for cheese lovers only."

=== Track listing ===
All tracks are written by Manfred Hübler and Siegfried Schwab

No.	Title	Length
1.	"Droge CX 9"	5:11
2.	"The Lions and the Cucumber"	5:10
3.	"There's No Satisfaction"	3:10
4.	"Dedicated to Love"	2:32
5.	"People's Playground Version A"	0:50
6.	"We Don't Care"	5:20
7.	"People's Playground Version B"	1:17
8.	"The Ballad of a Fair Singer"	4:35
9.	"Necronomania"	2:09
10.	"Kama Sutra"	4:03
11.	"The Message"	3:21
12.	"Shindai Lovers"	4:21
13.	"The Six Wisdoms of Aspasia"	4:20
14.	"Countdown to Nowhere"	2:27

== See also ==
- List of cult films
- List of ghost films
- List of horror films of 1971
- List of German films of the 1970s
- List of Spanish films of 1971
- Vampire films
