= Francisco Piquer =

Spanish actor

- Born: 2 June 1922
- Died: 11 December 2009 (aged 87); Madrid, Spain

Francisco Piquer Chanza (2 June 1922 – 11 December 2009) was a Spanish actor.

Piquer's career as a stage, film, television and voice actor spanned six decades beginning in 1940. He won the Prix du Cinema Writers Circle for his role as the protagonist in the 1957 film Dirty Hands. He was Juan Proctor in fourteen episodes of the comedy Studio 1 and appeared in four episodes of El Comisario among many others. One of his last film roles was in 1998 in José Luis Garci’s The Grandfather where he played the Prior of Zaratay. In 2007, he received what was his best role, that of Belardo with the National Classical Theater Company in Del Rey Abajo, Ninguno. On 11 December 2009 Francisco Piquer Chanza died in Madrid, Spain after a long illness.

== Filmography ==
| Year | Title | Role | Notes |
|---|---|---|---|
| 1955 | Lo que nunca muere | Enfermo | |
| 1955 | Los agentes del quinto grupo | Manuel | |
| 1955 | El cerco | José | |
| 1957 | Manos sucias | Andrès | |
| 1958 | Historias de la feria | Inspector | |
| 1958 | Rapsodia de sangre | Borodin | |
| 1958 | Giovane canaglia | | |
| 1958 | Cita imposible | Juanón | |
| 1958 | El ángel está en la cumbre | Arturo | |
| 1959 | Sendas marcadas | Mendoza | |
| 1959 | El emigrante | Ambrosio | |
| 1960 | L'ultima canzone | | |
| 1961 | Prohibido enamorarse | Doctor Juan Gómez Bolt | |
| 1962 | El grano de mostaza | | |
| 1962 | Queen of the Chantecler | Rafael | |
| 1965 | La extranjera | | |
| 1965 | Suena el clarín | | |
| 1966 | Lola, espejo oscuro | Paco | |
| 1966 | Clarines y campanas | | |
| 1966 | Sound of Horror | Stravos | |
| 1966 | Four Queens for an Ace | Pablo Gómez | |
| 1967 | El padre Manolo | César Espinosa | |
| 1967 | Lo que cuesta vivir... | El Atómico | |
| 1968 | La dinamita está servida | Jesús | |
| 1969 | Soltera y madre en la vida | Médico | |
| 1970 | El relicario | Mariano | |
| 1971 | ¿Es usted mi padre? | | |
| 1971 | El diablo Cojuelo | Astrólogo | |
| 1972 | Cerco de terror | Doctor Mac Gregor | |
| 1973 | Aborto criminal | Diego | |
| 1974 | Matrimonio al desnudo | Vicente | |
| 1979 | Father Cami's Wedding | | |
| 1980 | El gran secreto | Nicolás | |
| 1984 | De mica en mica s'omple la pica | Ros Estivill | |
| 1984 | Memorias del general Escobar | Coronel Ruiz | |
| 1987 | El Lute: Run for Your Life | Militar | |
| 1998 | The Grandfather | Prior de Zaratay | |
| 2004 | XXL | Gaspar | |
