= Il Fornaretto di Venezia =

- French film poster
- Directed by: Duccio Tessari
- Written by: Duccio Tessari; Marcello Fondato
- Starring: Michèle Morgan; Enrico Maria Salerno; Sylva Koscina; Jacques Perrin; Stefania Sandrelli
- Cinematography: Carlo Carlini
- Edited by: Franco Fraticelli; Solange Moret
- Music by: Armando Trovajoli
- Production companies: Lux Film; Ultra Film; Société des Etablissements L. Gaumont
- Distributed by: Gaumont Distribution
- Release date: 24 August 1963
- Running time: 110 minutes
- Countries: Italy; France
- Language: Italian

Il Fornaretto di Venezia (US TV title: The Scapegoat, French title Le Petit Boulanger de Venise or, alternatively, Le Procès des Doges — as seen on the poster) is a 1963 Italian-French drama film directed by Duccio Tessari who co-wrote the screenplay with Marcello Fondato, based on a novel by Francesco Dall'Ongaro.

== Plot ==
It tells the story of 16th century Venice where a young worker is sentenced to death on the suspicion of attacking a noble.

== Cast ==
- Jacques Perrin as Pietro, il fornaretto
- Michèle Morgan as Princess Sofia
- Enrico Maria Salerno as Lorenzo Barbo
- Sylva Koscina as Clemenza, Barbo's Wife
- Stefania Sandrelli as Anella
- Gastone Moschin as Consigliere Garzone
- Fred Williams as Alvise
- Mario Brega
- Renato Terra
