= The Devil Came from Akasava =

1971 film

- German theatrical release poster
- Directed by: Jess Frank
- Screenplay by: Ladislas Fodor; Paul André; Jesús Franco
- Based on: The Keepers of the Stone by Edgar Wallace
- Produced by: Artur Brauner
- Starring: Fred Williams; Susann Korda; Horst Tappert; Ewa Strömberg; Siegfried Schürenberg; Walter Rilla
- Cinematography: Manuel Merino
- Edited by: Clarissa Ambach; María Luisa Soriano
- Music by: Manfred Hübler; Siegfried Schwab
- Production companies: CCC Films; Fenix Films
- Distributed by: Cinerama Filmgesellschaft (West Germany); CEA Distribución (Spain)
- Release date: 5 March 1971
- Running time: 83 minutes
- Countries: West Germany; Spain
- Language: German

The Devil Came from Akasava (German: Der Teufel kam aus Akasava) is a 1971 West German-Spanish adventure-spy film directed by Jesús Franco. It was based on a novel by Edgar Wallace called The Keepers of the Stone.

The film was shot at the Spandau Studios in Berlin with location shooting in Lisbon and Spain.

== Background ==
The Devil Came from Akasava is based on the short story Keepers of the Stone in the collection Sanders of the River by Edgar Wallace, and forming a part of exotic stories on the fictional indigenous people of the Akasava. It is a late example of Edgar Wallace film adaptations that were particularly popular in Germany during the 1960s. Lead actress Soledad Miranda was killed in a car accident in Portugal soon after finishing this film.

== Plot ==
Prof. Walter Forrester (Williams) is a British scientist working in the Akasava jungle in South America. His assistant finds a mysterious stone, but it is stolen and Forrester vanishes, leaving him as the sole suspect. However, after a Scotland Yard detective is murdered while entering Forrester's office in London, Scotland Yard chief Sir Philipp hands the case to attractive agent Jane Morgan (Miranda), even though the Secret Intelligence Service will also be on the case due to its international priority. Morgan arrives in South America under the covert identity of the young stripper wife of British consul Irving Lambert. There she meets Rex Forrester, the professor's nephew, who is also concerned about his fate and is conducting his own investigation.

== Cast ==
- Soledad Miranda (as Susann Korda): Jane Morgan
- Fred Williams: Rex Forrester
- Jesús Franco (cameo): Tino Celli
- Horst Tappert: Dr. Andrew Thorrsen
- Alberto Dalbés: Irving Lambert
- Ewa Strömberg: Ingrid Thorrsen
- Ángel Menéndez: Prof. Walter Forrester
- Siegfried Schürenberg: Sir Philipp
- Walter Rilla: Lord Kingsley
- Paul Müller: Dr. Henry
- Blandine Ebinger: Abigail Kingsley
- Howard Vernon: Humphrey

== Reception ==
TV guide found it was a "Campy espionage tale". A review at Horror News stated, "Anyone familiar with Franco’s career knows that his films tend to be loaded with nudity and skirts the edges of being porn. Luckily, he toned down the sexual elements to fall in line to what was standard for James Bond-inspired films. However, toned down does not mean excised."
