= The Man with the Glass Eye =

1969 film

- Directed by: Alfred Vohrer
- Written by: Edgar Wallace (story); Paul Hengge; Ladislas Fodor; Dörte Gentz
- Produced by: Horst Wendlandt; Fritz Klotsch
- Starring: Horst Tappert; Karin Hübner; Hubert von Meyerinck
- Cinematography: Karl Löb
- Edited by: Jutta Hering
- Music by: Peter Thomas
- Production company: Rialto Film
- Distributed by: Constantin Film
- Release date: 21 February 1969
- Running time: 87 minutes
- Country: West Germany
- Language: German

The Man with the Glass Eye (German: Der Mann mit dem Glasauge) is a 1969 West German crime film directed by Alfred Vohrer and starring Horst Tappert, Karin Hübner and Hubert von Meyerinck. It is part of Rialto Film's long-running series of Edgar Wallace adaptations. Another English title is Terror on Half Moon Street.

The film's sets were designed by the art directors Walter Kutz and Wilhelm Vorwerg. It was shot at the Spandau Studios and on location in West Berlin, Hamburg and London.

== Cast ==
- Horst Tappert as Insp. Perkins
- Karin Hübner as Yvonne Duvall / Nora Wilson
- Hubert von Meyerinck as Sir Arthur
- Stefan Behrens as Sgt. Pepper
- Fritz Wepper as Lord Bruce Sheringham
- Ilse Pagé as Miss Finley
- Christiane Krüger as Linda
- Ewa Strömberg as Doris
- Marlies Dräger as Leslie
- Heidrun Hankammer as Leila
- Friedel Schuster as Lady Sheringham
- Rudolf Schündler as Nuthacher
- Maria Litto as Liz
- Jan Hendriks as Rubiro
- Iris Berben as Ann
- Harry Wüstenhagen as Parker
- Kurd Pieritz as Archibald Jefferson
- Narziss Sokatscheff as Boss
- Otto Czarski as Eric
- Harry Riebauer as Bob
- Tilo von Berlepsch as Mr. Randel
- Franz-Otto Krüger as Hotel porter
- Klaus Miedel as Donovan
- Berno von Cramm as Smith
- Günther Tabor as Stoke
- Ligia Lieveld as Laura
- Jörn Ahrendt as Dick
- Michael Simon as Mann in der Kabine
- Gerd Prager as George

== Bibliography ==
- Bergfelder, Tim. International Adventures: German Popular Cinema and European Co-Productions in the 1960s. Berghahn Books, 2005.
