= Sound of Horror =

- US double feature film poster
- Directed by: José Antonio Nieves Conde
- Screenplay by: Sam X. Abarbanel
- Story by: Sam X. Abarbanel; José Antonio Nieves Conde; Gregorio Sacristan; Gregg C. Tallas
- Produced by: Gregorio Sacristan de Hoyos
- Starring: James Philbrook; Arturo Fernández; Soledad Miranda; José Bódalo
- Cinematography: Manuel Berenguer
- Edited by: Margarita de Ochoa
- Music by: Luis de Pablo
- Production company: Zurbano Films
- Release date: 26 August 1966 (Spain)
- Running time: 91 minutes
- Country: Spain

Sound of Horror (Spanish: El sonido de la muerte) is a 1966 Spanish horror film directed by José Antonio Nieves Conde.

== Plot ==
In the Greek countryside, archaeologists Dr. Pete Asilov and Professor Andre detonate dynamite in an abandoned mountain cave, uncovering petrified eggs in the blasts. Taking one they fail to notice another had hatched, releasing a reptilian creature that vanishes. Andre lives in a nearby villa with his orphaned niece Maria and their superstitious Greek housekeeper Calliope, who warns Andre of the dangers of monsters and angry spirits in the mountain, which he ignores.

Later, as Andre investigates his half of an ancient map that tells of gold hidden in the cave, his business partner Dorman arrives with his associates Stravos, his driver and his girlfriend Sofia. They have the other half of the map which tells them where to dig for the treasure. Further ominous clues, such as the decaying body of an ancient neanderthal woman, enforce Calliope's warnings, but the men are determined to find the treasure. They discover the bones of a man who was likely buried to keep the location of the treasure a secret. As Stravos investigates the mummified corpse, he is killed when the creature stalks up unseen and slashes him to death with its claws. Shaken by its horrific scream, the men resolve to return to the cave for the treasure, blaming Stravos' death on would-be thieves from the nearby village. They are proven wrong and are chased back to the villa and in the process Dorman is injured. Terrified of what might be hunting them, they forget the treasure and work up a plan to escape. While fetching water for coffee, Calliope is killed by the creature and the humans barricade themselves in the villa.

Professor Andre, determined to see his niece safe, entrusts her with Pete who shares an affection with her and sneaks back to the cave in order to seal it. He is attacked, but not before he detonates the dynamite and blows the cave entrance shut. The next morning, believing themselves safe, the remainder of the group boards Andre's car and try to leave, but the engine floods. As they try to start it, the creature returns, forcing them back into the house. They are attacked by the creature after it gains entry to the villa, but Andre notices a trail of clawprints leading from the kitchen and using flour to help track the creature, they injure it with hatchets and it flees. They return to the car and are able to start it, however, the creature reveals itself to be on top of the car which forces them to pull over. Dorman ignites the fuel reserves in the back of the jeep, destroying himself and the creature in a massive ball of fire. With the creature dead, the four remaining survivors start their journey back to town on foot.

== Cast ==
- James Philbrook as Dr. Pete Asilov
- Arturo Fernández as Pete
- Soledad Miranda as Maria
- José Bódalo as Mr. Dorman
- Antonio Casas as Prof. Andre
- Ingrid Pitt as Sofia Minelli
- Lola Gaos as Calliope, the housekeeper
- Francisco Piquer as Stravos

== Release ==
Sound of Horror was released in Spain on August 26, 1966.

=== Critical response ===
Dave Sindelar on his website Fantastic Movie Musings and Ramblings gave the film a positive review, stating that in spite of its flaws, the film still managed to be scary. TV Guide reacted more negatively to the film, awarded it one out of five stars.
