= Primer Plano (magazine) =

Spanish film magazine

Clark Gable on the cover of the magazine's June 1947 issue

Primer Plano was a Spanish film magazine established on 20 October 1940. The founder was a Falange member Manuel Augusto García Viñolas. It was published on a weekly basis. The Falange-influenced publication struck a balance between its coverage of film stars and film reviews, as well as the role of entertainment and film in society.

Primer Plano ceased publication with the October 1963 issue.
