= Fénix Cooperativa Cinematográfica =

Spanish film production company

- Company type: Film studio
- Headquarters: Madrid, Spain

Fénix Cooperativa Cinematográfica is a Spanish production company based in Madrid known for The Lady Doctor (1958).

It produced Night of the Blood Monster (1970) along the Italian Prodimex Film, the Spanish-Italian-German-British film Count Dracula (1970) along Towers of London, Corona Filmproduktion and Filmar Compagnia Cinematografica, and Brandy (1963) by José Luis Borau and Mario Caiano. It also produced ¿Por qué morir en Madrid? (1966), by Eduardo Manzanos.

== Filmography ==
- The Lady Doctor (1957)
- La muchacha de la plaza de San Pedro (1958)
- Contrabando en Nápoles (1959)
- Escuela de seductoras (1962)
- Brandy (1964)
- Four Bullets for Joe (1964)
- Heroes of the West (1964)
- La tumba del pistolero (1964)
- Twins from Texas (1964)
- Django the Honorable Killer (1965)
- Assault on Fort Texan (1965)
- Fistful of Knuckles (1965)
- Kid Rodelo (1966)
- El escuadrón de la muerte (1966)
- Ringo and Gringo Against All (1966)
- Ringo's Big Night (1966)
- ¿Por qué morir en Madrid? (1966)
- The Million Dollar Countdown (1967)
- Los pistoleros de Paso Bravo (1968)
- The Bloody Judge (1970)
- Count Dracula (1970)
- Vampyros Lesbos (1971)
- Nights and Loves of Don Juan (1971)
- The Devil Came from Akasava (1971)
- X312 - Flight to Hell (1971)
- Drácula contra Frankenstein (1972)
- The Deadly Avenger of Soho (1972)
- La venganza del Doctor Mabuse (1972)
- Lovers of Devil's Island (1973)
- Fifteen Year Old Captain (1974)
- Drzwi w murze (1974)
- La noche de los asesinos (1974)
- Govoryashchaya obezyana (1991)
- American Experience (1988), episode Malcolm X: Make It Plain (1994)

== Bibliography ==
- Marcos Tejedor, Arturo (1 January 2005). Una Vida Dedicada Al Cine: Recuerdos de un Productor. Junta de Castilla y León, Consejería de Cultura y Turismo. p. 147. ISBN 9788497183437.
