= Count Dracula (1970 film) =

1970 film by Jesús Franco

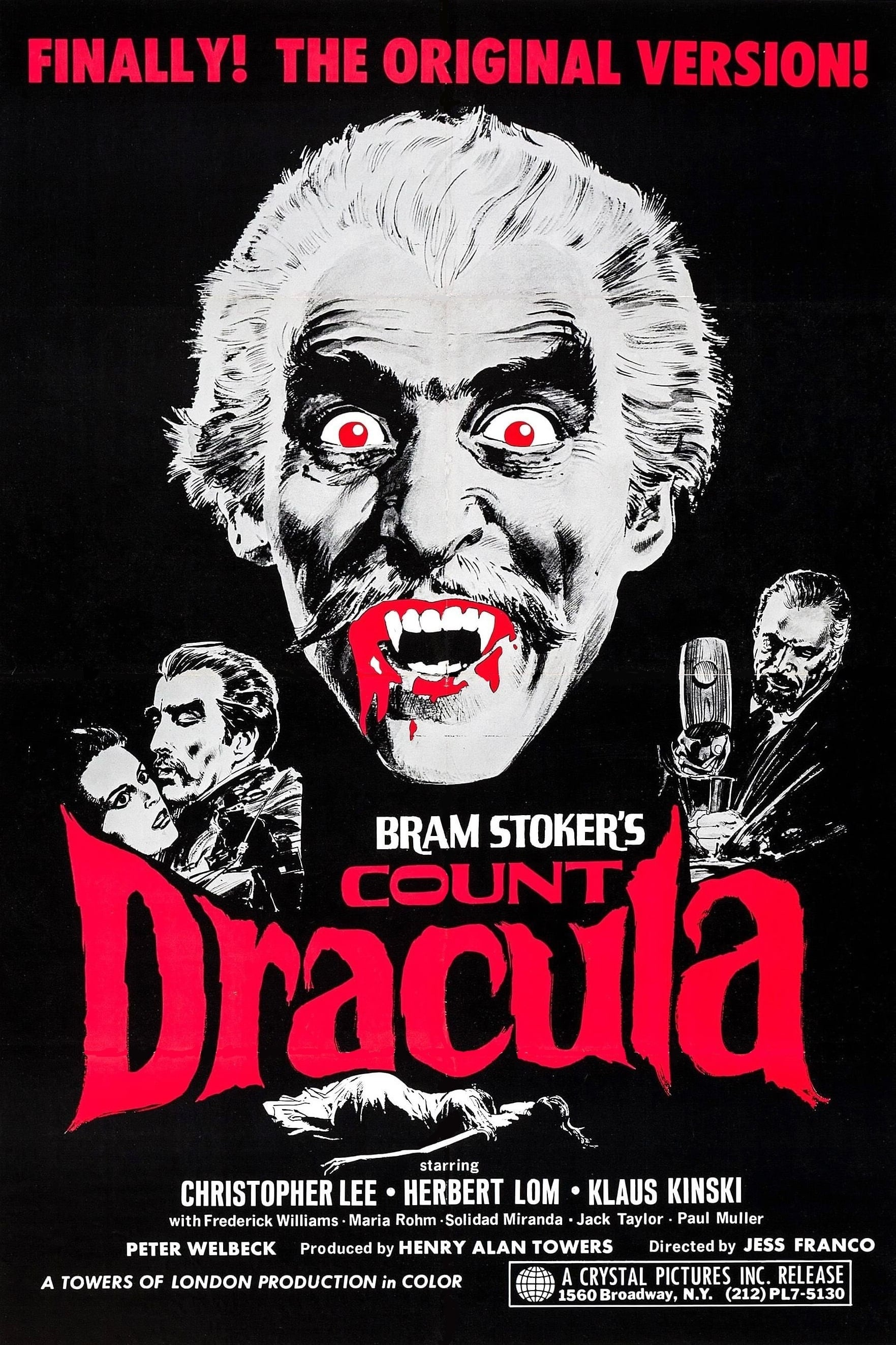
- US film poster
- German: Nachts, wenn Dracula erwacht
- Directed by: Jesús Franco
- Screenplay by: Augusto Finocchi; Jesús Franco; English version: Peter Welbeck; Italian version: Carlo Fadda; Milo G. Cuccia; German version: Dietmar Behnke
- Story by: Erich Kröhnke
- Based on: Dracula (1897 novel) by Bram Stoker
- Produced by: Harry Alan Towers
- Starring: Christopher Lee; Herbert Lom; Klaus Kinski; Frederick Williams; Maria Rohm; Soledad Miranda; Jack Taylor; Paul Muller
- Cinematography: Manuel Merino; Luciano Trasatti
- Edited by: Bruno Mattei; Derek Parsons; Spanish version: María Luisa Soriano
- Music by: Bruno Nicolai
- Production companies: Filmar Compagnia Cinematografica; Fénix Cooperativa Cinematográfica; Corona Filmproduktion; Towers of London
- Distributed by: Gloria Film (West Germany); INDIEF (Italy); Arce Film (Spain); Hemdale (UK)
- Release dates: 3 April 1970 (West Germany); 16 November 1970 (Spain); July 1973 (UK); 10 September 1973 (Italy)
- Running time: 97 minutes
- Countries: West Germany; Italy; Spain; United Kingdom
- Language: English

Count Dracula (German: Nachts, wenn Dracula erwacht, lit. 'At night, when Dracula awakens'; also known as El conde Drácula, Bram Stoker's Count Dracula, Il Conte Dracula) is a 1970 horror film directed and co-written by Jesús Franco, based on the 1897 novel Dracula by Bram Stoker. It stars Christopher Lee as the title character, Herbert Lom as Abraham Van Helsing, and Klaus Kinski as R.M. Renfield, along with Fred Williams, Maria Rohm, Soledad Miranda, Paul Muller and Jack Taylor.

The film was an international co-production between West Germany, Spain, Italy and the United Kingdom. Although Count Dracula stars Lee in the title role, it is not a Hammer production like his other Dracula films, being produced instead by Harry Alan Towers.

On initial release, Count Dracula was advertised as the most faithful adaptation of Bram Stoker's novel to date. Among other details, it was the first film version of the novel in which Dracula begins as an old man and becomes younger as he feeds upon fresh blood.

== Plot ==
Jonathan Harker, a lawyer traveling from London to Transylvania to secure property for Count Dracula, arrives at Bistritz to stay for the night. There, he is warned by a concerned lady against continuing his journey. Believing that her concerns are rooted in peasant superstition, he ignores her, but starts to feel unnerved by the way everyone looks at him. Harker later arrives at the Borgo Pass, where the Count's mysterious coachman picks him up.

Harker disembarks at Castle Dracula, and the coach immediately rushes off. Harker approaches the main door and meets a thin, tall, gaunt old man. He turns out to be Dracula and takes Harker to his bedchamber. There, Harker notices that Dracula casts no reflection.

Later, Harker goes to sleep and wakes in an ancient crypt where three beautiful vampiresses harass him. Dracula rushes into the room and orders them to leave Harker alone. He then gives them a baby to feed on. Harker wakes up screaming in his room and assumes it was a nightmare, but two small wounds on his neck indicate otherwise.

Harker soon realises he is a prisoner, and tries to escape by climbing out his bedroom window. He finds his way back to the crypt where Count Dracula and his three brides rest in coffins. Harker runs out of the crypt screaming, and jumps out of the castle's tower into the river below.

Harker wakes up in a private psychiatric clinic outside London, owned by Dr. Abraham Van Helsing, in the care of Dr. John Seward. He is told he was found delirious in a river near Budapest. No one believes his story about Castle Dracula until Van Helsing finds the two punctures on Harker's neck. Harker's fiancée Mina Murray and her close friend Lucy Westenra also arrive to help take care of him. Unbeknownst to them, Count Dracula has followed Harker back to England and now resides in an abandoned abbey close to the hospital.

As Mina takes care of Harker, Lucy's health strangely declines. Dracula has been secretly appearing to her by night and drinking her blood, growing younger as he feeds off his victim. Quincey Morris, Lucy's fiancé, joins Drs. Seward and Van Helsing in an attempt to save Lucy by giving her blood transfusions.

One of the patients at the clinic, R. M. Renfield, becomes of considerable interest to the men. Renfield is classed as a zoophagus: he eats flies and insects in order to consume their life, believing that each life he consumes increases his own. He reacts violently whenever Dracula is nearby. He later dies from shock.

Lucy eventually dies, becomes one of the undead and murders a young child. The ordeal is put to an end when Quincey, Seward and Van Helsing ambush Lucy, stake her through the heart and decapitate her. Harker, restored to health, joins the group who now are sure that Count Dracula is a vampire.

Dracula turns his attention to Mina and begins corrupting her as well. Van Helsing suddenly suffers a stroke and begins using a wheelchair. Dracula visits him, mocking his attempts to destroy him. But Van Helsing regains mobility, gets out of his wheelchair, and is able to walk again. Quincey, Harker and Dr. Seward track Dracula to the abandoned abbey, but he has fled to Transylvania with the aid of a traveling Romani band.

As Count Dracula's Gypsy servants take him back to his castle, he is trailed by Harker and Quincey. After battling the Romani, the two heroes find Dracula's coffin and set it on fire. Dracula, unable to escape in full daylight, is consumed by flames.

== Cast ==
- Christopher Lee as Count Dracula
- Herbert Lom as Professor Abraham Van Helsing
- Klaus Kinski as R.M. Renfield
- Fred Williams as Jonathan Harker
- Maria Rohm as Mina Murray
- Soledad Miranda as Lucy Westenra
- Jack Taylor as Quincey Morris
- Paul Muller as Dr. John "Jack" Seward
- Franco Castellani as Renfield's Warden
- Jesús Puente as the Minister of Interior
- José Martínez Blanco as Traveller

Uncredited

- Emma Cohen and Jeannine Mestre as Brides of Dracula
- Teresa Gimpera as Crying Mother
- Jesús Franco as Van Helsing's Servant

== Production ==
The production originally planned use Barrandov Studios in Czechoslovakia, but due to budgetary constrains filming took place at Balcázar Studios in Barcelona, Spain. The scenes at Professor Abraham Van Helsing's sanatorium were shot at Tirrenia Studios in Italy. Exteriors were shot mainly in Spain, with some second unit footage in France. The exteriors of Castle Dracula were filmed at Santa Bárbara Castle in Alicante, which Jesús Franco later used to film Dracula, Prisoner of Frankenstein. The film's sets were designed by the art director Karl Schneider and set decorator Emilio Zago (jointly credited under the alias George O'Brown). A scene featuring taxidermied animals that are reanimated—implicitly under Dracula's command—was reportedly improvised by Franco, and was accomplished by out-of-frame stagehands turning the animals' bodies towards the camera.

Franco originally wanted to cast Vincent Price as Professor Van Helsing, but he was under contract to American International Pictures. Franco then turned to Dennis Price, but he was prevented from taking the role due to health issues. In the end, Harry Alan Towers brought aboard his regular actor Herbert Lom. Due to his late arrival, all of his scenes had to be shot separately from Christopher Lee. Consequently, Dracula and Van Helsing never appear in the same shot together. Dubbing for the English-language version was supervised by Mel Welles. Lee and Lom did their own dubbing. The German dub had Wilhelm Borchert as the voice of Dracula.

== Release ==
The film premiered in West Germany on April 3, 1970 under the title Nachts, wenn Dracula erwacht (lit. At Night, When Dracula Awakens). In the United Kingdom, an English dub was released by Hemdale Film Corporation in July 1973.

=== Home media ===
Count Dracula was released on DVD in 2007 by Dark Sky Films. Special features include an interview with director Jesús Franco, a reading from Bram Stoker's Dracula novel by Christopher Lee, and a text essay on the life of actress Soledad Miranda. The DVD has come under criticism for omitting the scene in which a distraught mother (Teresa Gimpera) pleads for her baby's life at the door of Dracula's castle. The DVD also uses the Italian credits for the film but with the French title card Les Nuits de Dracula.

The film was released uncensored on Blu-ray and DVD in 2015 by Severin Films. A 4K Ultra HD Blu-ray release, sourced from an uncut camera negative, was released in 2023 also by Severin Films.

== Reception ==
=== Critical response ===
Robert Firsching of The New York Times wrote, "This doggedly faithful adaptation is plodding and dull. Even Christopher Lee (in an uncharacteristically weak performance as Dracula), Klaus Kinski (as the mad Renfield), and seven credited screenwriters cannot make this confused, distant film worthwhile. Franco appears as a servant to Professor Van Helsing (Herbert Lom), and though certainly literate, the film nevertheless fails as both horror and drama."

Brett Cullum of DVD Verdict wrote, "For curious Dracula fans, Jess Franco's Count Dracula is a neat find. It's a stellar cast working under a low budget, and it comes off entertaining if not a classic. It's a B-movie treatment at best, but ... Lee comes off fiery and committed to making this Count one that will be noticed." Brian Lindsey of Eccentric Cinema wrote, "Upon weighing [the film's] pros and cons, Count Dracula emerges a substantially flawed film. But I can still recommend it to any fan of Lee, Franco, Miranda, and even of Stoker's novel." George R. Reis of DVD Drive-In wrote, "Count Dracula is flawed in many ways, but for fans of gothic horror, it's still irresistible ... Barcelona naturally allows for some truly handsome scenery and an appropriate castle for Dracula to dwell in, and the performances of the international cast are above average."

Dracula scholar Leslie S. Klinger said "the picture begins well, closely following the Stoker narrative account of Harker's encounter with Dracula. The film rapidly proceeds into banality, however, and except for the characterization of Lee as an older Dracula and the brilliant Kinski, the film is largely forgettable." Film critic Jonathan Rosenbaum called it "one of the world's worst horror films" in his review of Pere Portabella's film Cuadecuc, vampir, which was shot during the making of this film.

== Cuadecuc, vampir ==
Cuadecuc, vampir is a 1970 experimental film by Pere Portabella that was shot behind-the-scenes of Count Dracula, including candid footage of the stars during the production.

== See also ==
- Vampire films
