= A Virgin Among the Living Dead =

1973 film

- 1973 Film poster
- Directed by: Jesús Franco
- Written by: Jesús Franco
- Cinematography: José Climent
- Edited by: Josiane Pierrette Belair
- Music by: Bruno Nicolai
- Production company: Prodif Ets.
- Release date: 12 July 1973 (France)

A Virgin Among the Living Dead is a film directed by Jesús Franco. Franco shot the film in Portugal in 1971 with the film it was only being released to the public in 1973. While credited as a production of Liechtenstein, it was submitted theatrically as being the product of various countries, with a Franco biographer suggesting that the Prodif Ets. company was set up as a tax shelter.

Several versions of the film were released theatrically with added footage, ranging from erotic scenes to scenes featuring zombies.

== Plot ==
A beautiful young woman named Christina arrives in Europe to visit her estranged relatives in a small castle for the reading of her dead father's will. She eventually discovers that they are all undead, and they fear that when she inherits her father's mansion, she will ask them all to leave. But Christina is lonely and tells her Uncle Howard that she wants them all to remain there and live with her. She learns that a spirit called the Queen of the Night has claimed her father's eternal soul because he committed suicide by hanging himself. Christina winds up becoming one of the living dead herself, and at the end of the film, she and the rest of the family all solemnly march off into a swamp on the estate's grounds, accompanied by the Queen of the Night.

== Cast ==
- Christine von Blanc as Christina Benson
- Britt Nichols as Carmencé
- Rosita Palomares as Aunt Abigail
- Anne Libert as The Queen of the Night
- Howard Vernon as Uncle Howard
- Paul Muller as Ernesto Pablo Reiner, Christina's father
- Jesús Franco as Mr. Basilio

The following cast went uncredited:

- Nicole Guettard as Female Nurse
- Alice Arno as Woman on throne

== Production ==
The film was shot between November and December 1971 in Portugal, including around Palácio dos Condes de Castro Guimarães in Cascais and the nearby town of Sintra. Some shots are done in Spain such as the opening seafront scene. Director Jesús Franco shot this film under the title La nuit des étoiles filantes (transl. The Night of Shooting Stars). While filming, Franco took time to shoot extra material for the partially completed film Jungfrauen-Report, which had begun filming earlier that year for Artur Brauner's Tele-Cine Film.

The film is credited to a single production company, described by Franco biographer Stephen Thrower as the “notoriously untraceable” Prodif Ets. that was stated as being based in Liechtenstein. Franco had made other films for Prodif Ets such as Nightmares Come at Night (1973). As the company never made films for any other director, Franco biographer Stephen Thrower suggested that the company was set up as a tax haven, similar to how producer Harry Alan Towers had done.

Little is known about the film's lead Cristine von Blanc, including her real name which is unknown.

== Release ==
The film was screened for potential distributors at the Cannes Film Market in 1973. It received a theatrical release in 1973 in France as Christina princesse de l'érotisme. After this screening, various new versions emerged. One was titled Une vierge chez les morts vivants where it was listed as a Belgian production. The other version was called Christina princesse de l'érotisme which added a sequence of an orgy scene with actors not seen in the original 1971 footage. These erotic scenes were directed by Pierre Querut.

Another version titled Desideri erotici di Christine was cleared for theatrical release in Italy. Another version, which was the most common version to find on home video prior to the advent of DVD was the 1981 version released by Eurociné in 1981 that included brief shots of zombies done by Jean Rollin. Rollin suggested these scenes were done quickly, where he “Just filmed some people dressed up as zombies. I don't think I ever saw Franco's movie.” The film has been released under various English titles and on two American home video releases as Zombie 4: A Virgin Among the Living Dead and Virgin Among the Living Dead.

The film was released in France on July 12, 1973. Later screenings include Italy on November 11, 1978, Seville & Madrid on July 7, 1981 and Barcelona on July 26, 1982. Various versions had different running times, with Christina princesse de l'érotisme being 90 minutes, and the Belgian version titled Une vierge chez les morts vivants being edited to 80 minutes.

The film was released the same way on DVD in the United States by Image Entertainment in 2003 as part of their EuroShock horror line. On August 20, 2013, a Blu-ray edition, containing Franco's original director's cut, was made available by Redemption.

== Reception ==
Richard Whittaker of The Austin Chronicle called it “one of the most infamously mutilated underground favorites”, and said the original Franco version is the best cut of the film. Chris Alexander of Fangoria called the original Franco cut “a loose, atmospheric masterpiece of pure cinema”. Gordon Sullivan of DVD Verdict wrote that the Kino-Redemption release is “a triumph for Franco fans, though unlikely to appeal outside that demographic”.

Bill Gibron of DVD Talk rated it 3.5 out of 5 stars, calling it “a truly unnerving experience representing Franco at his most visually arresting”. Writing in The Zombie Movie Encyclopedia, academic Peter Dendle called it “an atrophied psychological horror, which is over-stylish and impressionistic to the point of incoherence”.

== See also ==
- List of zombie films
- List of mainstream movies with unsimulated sex
