= Paul Müller (actor) =

Swiss actor (1923–2016)

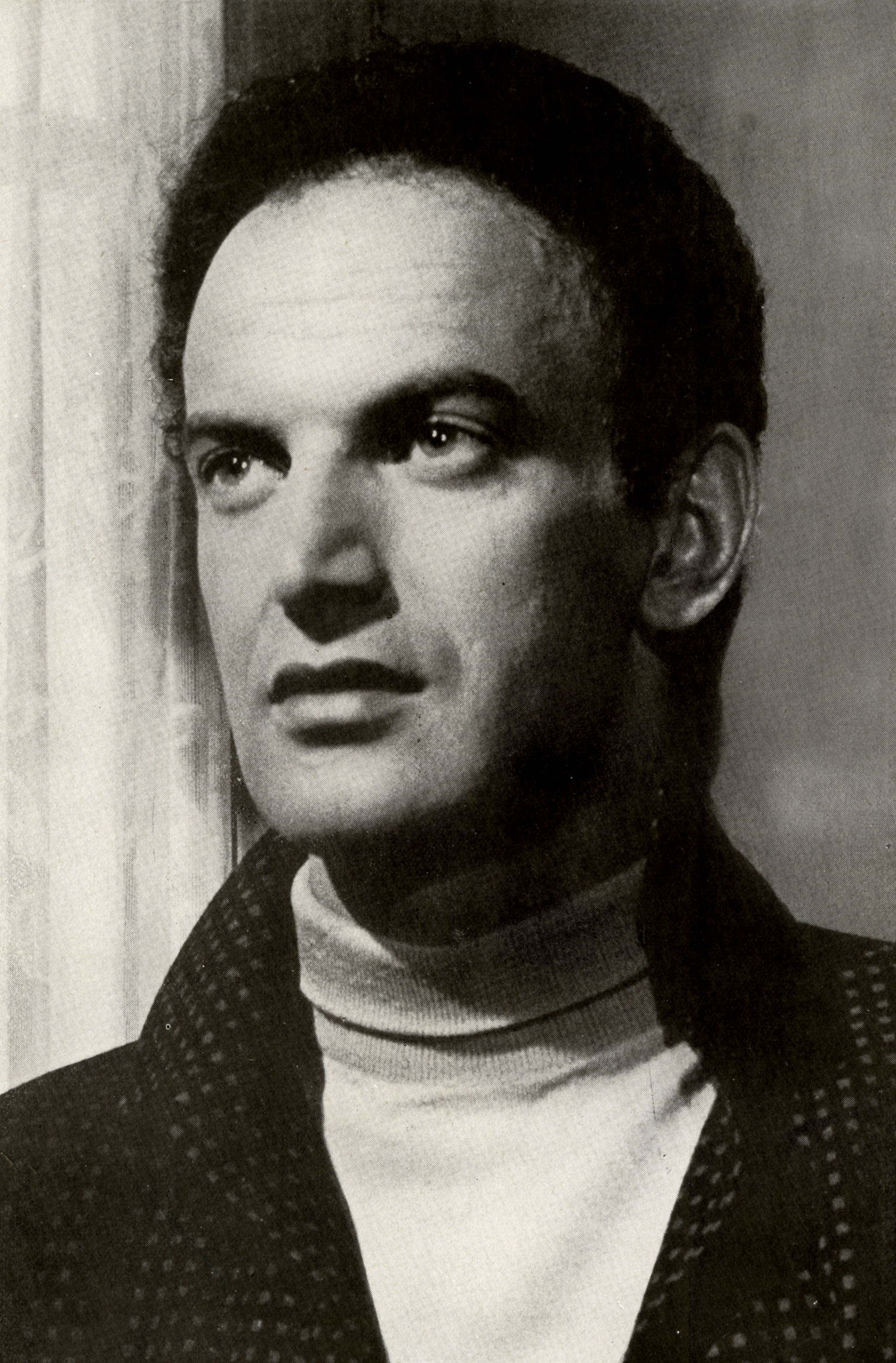
- Müller in 1953.
- Born: Paul Konrad Müller; 11 March 1923; Neuchâtel, Canton of Neuchâtel, Switzerland
- Died: 2 September 2016 (aged 93); Tivoli, Lazio, Italy
- Education: Conservatoire national supérieur d'art dramatique
- Occupation: Actor
- Years active: 1944–2004

Paul Konrad Müller (11 March 1923 – 2 September 2016) was a Swiss actor, who spent the majority of his career in working in Italian cinema. His motion picture acting career spanned a period of 51 years, with over 230 film and television roles between 1948 and 2004.

== Early life and education ==
Müller was born in Neuchâtel in 1923, to upper-class Swiss and French parents active in the Salvation Army. Due to his parents' work, he moved frequently during his childhood, raised at various points in Bern and Brussels, and finally settling in Paris in 1934. He originally trained to be a typographer, before enrolling in the Conservatoire national supérieur d'art dramatique in 1941.

== Career ==
=== Theatre ===
Müller had different engagements at theatres in Paris, including the Théâtre Pigalle and Salle Pleyel. After the liberation of Paris in 1944, he enlisted in the French Army, and served for two years in Indochina, shortly before the First Indochina War took place there. He caught malaria during that time and, in consequence of the disease, was left hard of hearing in one of his ears.

He was discharged in 1947, and had different engagements at theatres and touring companies not only in France, but also in the French part of Allied-occupied Germany and in Florence, e. g. "Tournée Spectacles Moyses", Teatro della Pergola, under the direction of Georges Douking.

=== Film ===
Müller's first film role came at age 25 in Ruy Blas (1948), directed by Pierre Billon. However, his career took off after he relocated to Italy, and found himself working with preeminent directors like Roberto Rossellini, Pietro Germi, Mario Bava, Sergio Corbucci, Michelangelo Antonioni, Riccardo Freda and Alessandro Blasetti. During the 1950s, he established himself as a respected and in-demand character actor in Italian cinema, typically cast as villains or other malefactors. In 1954, he had the lead role in the West German film Verrat an Deutschland, a biopic of Soviet spy Richard Sorge.

Beginning with 1957's I Vampiri, Müller became a fixture in the horror film genre. He was notably one of the frequent collaborators of Spanish cult director Jesús Franco, appearing in 15 of his films during the 1960s and '70s. He also appeared in films under the direction of René Clément, Michael Curtiz, Richard Fleischer, Jean-Pierre Mocky and many others.

In 2009, the German distributor Anolis published a 2-disc DVD Collector's Edition of I Vampiri. That item includes, inter alia, three different versions of the first Italian horror movie of the sound era and an exclusive interview with Müller about his career ("C'est la Vie – Paul Müller erzählt").

== Death ==
Müller died in Tivoli, Lazio on 2 September 2016, at the age of 93.

== Selected filmography ==
- Ruy Blas (dir. Pierre Billon, 1948)
- Une grande fille toute simple (dir. Jacques Manuel, 1948)
- Buried Alive (dir. Guido Brignone, 1949), as Count Federico De Rossi
- Fabiola (dir. Alessandro Blasetti, 1949)
- William Tell (dir. Giorgio Pastina and Michał Waszyński, 1949), as Gessler
- Il bacio di una morta (dir. Guido Brignone, 1949), as Hans
- Sicilian Uprising (dir. Giorgio Pastina, 1949), as Duke de Saint-Rémy, Governor of Palermo
- Il falco rosso (dir. Carlo Ludovico Bragaglia, 1949), as Baron Goffredo
- Romanticismo (dir. Clemente Fracassi, 1949), as Cesky
- Toto Looks for a Wife (dir. Carlo Ludovico Bragaglia, 1950), as Carlo
- The Transporter (dir. Giorgio Simonelli, 1950)
- The Black Captain (dir. Giorgio Ansoldi and Alberto Pozzetti, 1951), as Giuliano
- Four Ways Out (dir. Pietro Germi, 1951), as Guido Marchi
- Revenge of the Pirates (dir. Primo Zeglio, 1951), as Espinosa
- Stasera sciopero (dir. Mario Bonnard, 1951), as The mad man
- Repentance (dir. Mario Costa, 1952), as Berardo Morelli
- Viva il cinema! (dir. Giorgio Baldaccini and Enzo Trapani, 1952)
- La voce del sangue (dir. Pino Mercanti, 1952), as Count Franco Sampieri
- Abracadabra (dir. Max Neufeld, 1952), as Alfredo
- Lieutenant Giorgio (dir. Raffaello Matarazzo, 1952), as Count Stefano di Monserrato
- Brothers of Italy (dir. Fausto Saraceni, 1952), as Luigi Staffi
- I sette dell'Orsa maggiore (dir. Duilio Coletti, 1953), as Enemy agent
- The Blind Woman of Sorrento (dir. Giacomo Gentilomo, 1953), as Carlo Basileo
- Anna's Sin (dir. Camillo Mastrocinque, 1953), as Alberto
- I misteri della giungla nera (dir. Ralph Murphy and Gian Paolo Callegari, 1954), as Suyodhana
- La prigioniera di Amalfi (dir. Giorgio Cristallini, 1954), as Baron Cangemi
- Two Nights with Cleopatra (dir. Mario Mattoli, 1954), as Tortul
- Public Opinion (dir. Maurizio Corgnati and Goffredo Alessandrini, 1954), as Carlo Leone
- La vendetta dei Tughs (dir. Ralph Murphy and Gian Paolo Callegari, 1954), as Suyodhana
- Schiava del peccato (dir. Raffaello Matarazzo, 1954), as Voyager
- Journey to Italy (dir. Roberto Rossellini, 1954), as Paul Dupont
- Verrat an Deutschland (dir. Veit Harlan, 1955), as Richard Sorge
- Suonno d'ammore (dir. Sergio Corbucci, 1955), as Carmelo
- Tom Toms of Mayumba (dir. Gian Gaspare Napolitano, 1955), as Dr. Assar
- Agguato sul mare (dir. Pino Mercanti, 1955), as Baron Staratta
- Lacrime di sposa (dir. Sante Chimirri, 1956), as Toni Icardi
- Incatenata dal destino (dir. Enzo Di Gianni, 1956), as Piero
- Checkpoint (dir. Ralph Thomas, 1956), as Petersen
- The Adventures of Arsène Lupin (dir. Jacques Becker, 1957), as Rudolf von Kraft
- I Vampiri (dir. Riccardo Freda and Mario Bava, 1957), as Joseph Signoret
- Pirate of the Half Moon (dir. Giuseppe Maria Scotese, 1957), as Charles V
- Il Conte di Matera (dir. Luigi Capuano, 1958), as Filiberto
- Story of a Poor Young Man (dir. Marino Girolami, 1958), as Bevallan
- Quando gli angeli piangono (dir. Marino Girolami, 1958)
- Slave Women of Corinth (dir. Mario Bonnard, 1958), as L'Asiatico
- The Naked Maja (dir. Henry Koster, 1958), as The French ambassador
- Captain Falcon (dir. Carlo Campogalliani, 1958), as Rusca
- Sheba and the Gladiator (dir. Guido Brignone, 1959), as High Priest
- Un canto nel deserto (dir. Marino Girolami, 1959), as Rudi
- Due selvaggi a corte (dir. Ferdinando Baldi, 1959), as Count Sarzese
- Signé Arsène Lupin (dir. Yves Robert, 1959), as Attaché at the embassy in Rome
- Purple Noon (dir. René Clément, 1960), as The blind man
- La strada dei giganti (dir. Guido Malatesta, 1960), as Count Monza
- Queen of the Pirates (dir. Mario Costa, 1960), as Duke Zulian
- The Conqueror of the Orient (dir. Tanio Boccia, 1960), as Sultan Dakar
- Minotaur, the Wild Beast of Crete (dir. Silvio Amadio, 1960), as Medico di Corte
- La grande vallata (dir. Angelo Dorigo, 1961)
- The Wastrel (dir. Michael Cacoyannis, 1961)
- Legge di guerra (dir. Bruno Paolinelli, 1961), as Interpreter
- Capitani di ventura (dir. Angelo Dorigo, 1961), as Count Falcino
- Pontius Pilate (dir. Irving Rapper and Gian Paolo Callegari, 1962), as Mehlik
- Avenger of the Seven Seas (dir. Domenico Paolella, 1962), as Hornblut
- Lasciapassare per il morto (dir. Mario Gariazzo, 1962), as The fourth accomplice
- It Happened in Athens (dir. Andrew Marton, 1962), as Priest
- Women of Devil's Island (dir. Domenico Paolella, 1962), as Lefèvre
- Attack of the Normans (dir. Giuseppe Vari, 1962), as Thomas
- Street of Temptation (dir. Imo Moszkowicz, 1962), as Dr. Salvatori
- Torpedo Bay (dir. Charles Frend and Bruno Vailati, 1963), as Police Commander
- Goliath and the Sins of Babylon (dir. Michele Lupo, 1963), as King Rukus of Cafaus
- Kali Yug: Goddess of Vengeance (dir. Mario Camerini, 1963), as Botanist Alamian
- Desert Raiders (dir. Tanio Boccia, 1964), as Yussuf
- Cover Girls (dir. José Bénazéraf, 1964), as Enrico
- Da Istanbul ordine di uccidere (dir. Carlo Ferrero, 1965)
- Fall of the Mohicans (dir. Mateo Cano, 1965), as Colonel Munro
- Nightmare Castle (dir. Mario Caiano, 1965), as Dr. Stephen Arrowsmith
- Von Ryan's Express (die. Mark Robson, 1965), as Capt. Josef Sonneberg (uncredited)
- Don Camillo in Moscow (dir. Luigi Comencini, 1965), as Russian priest
- Lady Morgan's Vengeance (dir. Massimo Pupillo, 1965), as Sir Harold Morgan
- Thompson 1880 (dir. Guido Zurli, 1966), as Jameson Brady
- Silenzio: Si uccide (dir. Guido Zurli, 1967), as Theotocritos
- Three Supermen in Tokyo (dir. Bitto Albertini, 1968)
- Uno di più all'inferno (dir. Giovanni Fago, 1968), as George Ward
- Stuntman (dir. Marcello Baldi, 1968), as Lamb
- Bootleggers (dir. Alfio Caltabiano, 1969), as Pythagoras
- Malenka (dir. Amando de Ossorio, 1969), as Dr. Albert
- Venus in Furs (dir. Jesús Franco, 1969), as Hermann
- How Did a Nice Girl Like You Get Into This Business? (dir. Will Tremper, 1970), as The Director
- Eugenie… The Story of Her Journey into Perversion (dir. Jesús Franco, 1970), as Monsieur de Mistival
- Eugenie de Sade (dir. Jesús Franco, shot in 1970 and released in 1973), as Albert Radeck de Franval
- Count Dracula (dir. Jesús Franco, 1970), as Dr. Seward
- Angeli senza paradiso (dir. Ettore Maria Fizzarotti, 1970), as Hermann Fux
- The Devil Came from Akasava (dir. Jesús Franco, 1971), as Dr. Henry
- Vampyros Lesbos (dir. Jesús Franco, 1971), as Dr. Steiner
- X312 - Flight to Hell (dir. Jesús Franco, 1971), as John Somers
- Love Hate (dir. Jean-Pierre Mocky, 1971), as Ernest Cavalier
- Lady Frankenstein (dir. Mel Welles, 1971), as Dr. Charles Marshall
- She Killed in Ecstasy (dir. Jesús Franco, 1971), as Dr. Franklin Houston
- Gang War in Naples (dir. Pasquale Squitieri, 1972), as L'onorevole
- Life Is Tough, Eh Providence? (dir. Giulio Petroni, 1972), as Mr. Summitt
- Treasure Island (dir. John Hough, 1972), as Blind Pew
- Tragic Ceremony (dir. Riccardo Freda, 1972), as Doctor
- Maria Rosa la guardona (dir. Marino Girolami, 1973)
- Studio legale per una rapina (dir. Tanio Boccia, 1973), as Albert
- The Edifying and Joyous Story of Colinot (dir. Nina Companeez, 1973), as Brother Hugo
- A Virgin Among the Living Dead (dir. Jesús Franco, 1973), as Ernesto Pablo Reiner
- The Arena (dir. Steve Carver, 1974), as Lucilius
- Miracles Still Happen (dir. Giuseppe Maria Scotese, 1974), as Juliane's father
- Kidnap (dir. Giovanni Fago, 1974), as Jimmy
- Un linceul n'a pas de poches (dir. Jean-Pierre Mocky, 1974), as Minecci
- Heroes in Hell (dir. Joe D'Amato, 1974), as German Soldier
- Furia nera (dir. Demofilo Fidani, 1975)
- Une vierge pour Saint-Tropez (dir. Georges Friedland, 1975), as Mr. Witson
- Frauengefängnis a.k.a. Barbed Wire Dolls (dir. Jesús Franco, 1976), as Carlos Costa
- Tutto suo padre (dir. Maurizio Lucidi, 1976), as Stringer
- Mark Strikes Again (dir. Stelvio Massi, 1976), as Austrian inspector
- A Woman at Her Window (dir. Pierre Granier-Deferre, 1976), as Hotel manager
- The Witness (dir. Jean-Pierre Mocky, 1978), as Maurisson's brother-in-law
- The Perfect Crime (dir. Giuseppe Rosati, 1978), as Gibson
- Derrick – Season 6, Episode 7: "Lena" (TV, 1979), as Mr. Witte
- Fantozzi contro tutti (dir. Neri Parenti and Paolo Villaggio, 1980), as Visconte Cobram
- Camera d'albergo (dir. Mario Monicelli, 1981), as Hans
- Sogni mostruosamente proibiti (dir. Neri Parenti, 1982), as The hotel butler
- Nana, the True Key of Pleasure (dir. Dan Wolman, 1983), as Xavier
- The Practice of Love (dir. Valie Export, 1985), as French Industrialist
- The Two Lives of Mattia Pascal (dir. Mario Monicelli, 1985), as Thief in Monte Carlo
- Fracchia contro Dracula (dir. Neri Parenti, 1985), as The employer of Fracchia
- Let's Hope It's a Girl (dir. Mario Monicelli, 1986), as Priest
- Salome (dir. Claude d'Anna, 1986), as Doctor
- Meglio baciare un cobra (dir. Massimo Pirri, 1986), as Fontaine
- The Commander (dir. Antonio Margheriti, 1988), as Carbalo
- Fantozzi va in pensione (dir. Neri Parenti, 1988), as Duke Count Francesco Maria Barambani
- La bottega dell'orefice (dir. Michael Anderson, 1989), as Driver
- Fantozzi alla riscossa (dir. Neri Parenti, 1990), as Duke Count Francesco Maria Barambani
- Paprika (dir. Tinto Brass, 1991), as Milvio
- Le comiche 2 (dir. Neri Parenti, 1991), as the Colonel
- Li chiamarono... briganti! (dir. Pasquale Squitieri, 1999), as Bishop of Melfi
