= Fred Williams (actor) =

German actor (born 1938)

- Born: 9 February 1938 (age 88); Munich, Bavaria, Nazi Germany
- Occupation: Actor
- Years active: 1962–1992

Friedrich Wilhelm Löcherer (born 9 February 1938), known professionally as Fred Williams, is a German actor. He appeared in more than forty films from 1962 to 1992. 1977 came his most well-known international role as Captain Gräbner, the commander of the reconnaissance battle group of 9th SS Panzer Division Hohenstaufen in Richard Attenborough's film A Bridge Too Far.

== Filmography ==
Film
Year	Title	Role	Notes
1962	Il capitano di ferro	Leopoldo	
1963	The Shortest Day	L'attendente di von Gassman	Uncredited
1963	Il fornaretto di Venezia	Alvise	
1964	The Magnificent Cuckold	Man in Nightclub	Uncredited
1964	Cover Girls	Philippe	
1965	The Gentlemen		
1965	Sandra	Pierto Formari	
1965	Juliet of the Spirits	Lynx-Eyes' agent	
1966	Angelique and the King	Ràkóczi	
1966	Die Nibelungen	Gernot	
1967	Anyone Can Play	Esmerelda's lover	
1968–1969	Rinaldo Rinaldini	Rinaldo Rinaldini	TV series
1969	Madame and Her Niece	Peter von Hallstein	
1969	Catherine, il suffit d'un amour	Michel de Montsalvy	
1969	Isabella, Duchess of the Devils	Viscount Gilbert de Villancourt	
1970	Count Dracula	Jonathan Harker	
1971	The Devil Came from Akasava	Rex Forrester	
1971	She Killed in Ecstasy	Dr. Johnson	
1972	The Deadly Avenger of Soho	Inspector Ruppert Redford	
1972	La venganza del Doctor Mabuse	Sheriff Bromer Thomas	
1974	The Last Desperate Hours	Dario Lippi	
1975	Le jouisseur	Count Roland	
1975	Les Chatouilleuses	Carlos Ribas	
1975	Les incestueuses		
1975	Les lesbiennes		
1976	Nick the Sting	Roizman	
1976	Les emmerdeuses	Guest Appearance	Uncredited
1976	Voir Malte et mourir		
1977	Le lunghe notti della Gestapo	Helmut von Danzig	
1977	A Bridge Too Far	Hauptsturmführer Viktor Eberhard Gräbner	
1983	And the Ship Sails On	Sabatino Lepori	

== Bibliography ==
- Ryan, Cornelius (1974), A Bridge Too Far, London: Hamish Hamilton, ISBN 0-340-19941-5
- Waddy, Colonel John (1977), "The Making of a Bridge Too Far", After the Battle (17), London: Plaistow Press: 10–34
