= Margarita de Ochoa =

Spanish film editor

- Other name: Margarita Ochoa
- Occupation: Film editor
- Years active: 1940-1970 (film)

Margarita de Ochoa was a Spanish film editor who worked on around fifty films during her career including Calle Mayor (1956). Ochoa edited a wide range of commercial films beginning in the 1940s, and worked with Spanish directors Jose Antonio Nieves Conde and Juan Antonio Bardem. Nieves Conde called upon Ochoa to edit seven of the eleven films he produced in the first half of his career. Bardem, after his first film and until Ochoa's death in the mid-1960s, employed her only to edit his films no one else.

== Selected filmography ==
- Whirlwind (1941)
- Unknown Path (1946)
- Black Jack (1950)
- Under the Sky of Spain (1953)
- The Beauty of Cadiz (1953)
- Plot on the Stage (1953)
- The Devil Plays the Flute (1953)
- The Red Fish (1955)
- Calle Mayor (1956)
- The Tenant (1957)
- Sonatas (1959)
- Sound of Horror (1964)
- Death of a Cyclist (1955)

== Bibliography ==
- Mira, Alberto; Nouselles, Alberto Mira (2005). The Cinema of Spain and Portugal. Wallflower Press. ISBN 978-1-904764-44-1.
- Labanyi, Jo; Pavlović, Tatjana, eds. (2012). A Companion to Spanish Cinema. doi:10.1002/9781118322765. ISBN 978-1-4051-9438-9.
