= Soledad Miranda =

Spanish actress and pop singer (1943–1970)

- Miranda in She Killed in Ecstasy (1971)
- Born: Soledad Rendón Bueno; 9 July 1943; Seville, Spain
- Died: 18 August 1970 (aged 27); Lisbon, Portugal
- Other names: Susann Korda; Susann Korday; Susan Korda
- Occupations: Actress; singer
- Years active: 1960–1970
- Spouse: José Manuel Simões (m. 1966)
- Children: 1

Soledad Rendón Bueno (9 July 1943 – 18 August 1970), better known by her stage names Soledad Miranda or Susann Korda (or sometimes Susan Korday), was a Spanish actress and singer. She starred in several films directed by cult filmmaker Jess Franco, such as Count Dracula (1970), Vampyros Lesbos (1970), and She Killed in Ecstasy (1971). She also released numerous Spanish-language pop songs throughout the mid-sixties.

Miranda died in a car accident on a Lisbon highway in August 1970: she was aged 27. She was just about to sign a film contract with Franco's producer, Karl Heinz Mannchen.

== Biography ==
=== Early life ===
Soledad Miranda was born Soledad Rendón Bueno on 9 July 1943 in Seville, Spain. Soledad (from the Spanish for Our Lady of Solitude) was the niece of the famous Spanish singer-actress-flamenco dancer, Paquita Rico. At age 8, Miranda made her professional debut when she was hired as a flamenco dancer and singer- first in the "Youth Galas" at the Seville Fair and San Fernando theatre, and then on a tour throughout southern Spain.

=== Career ===
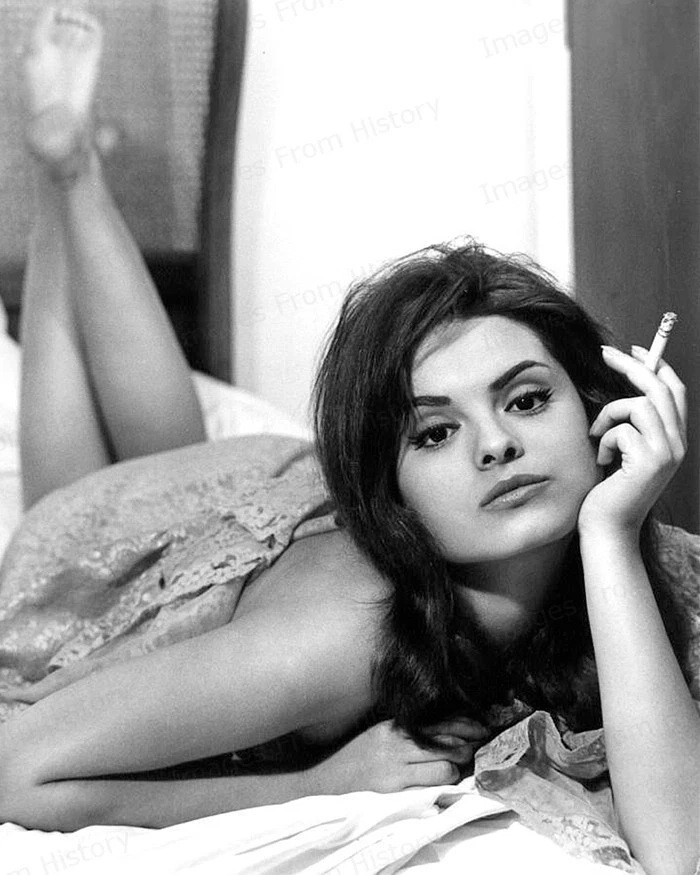
Miranda ca. 1963

At age 16, Miranda moved to Madrid and drew an artistic stage name out of a hat. She made her film debut in 1960 as a dancer in a musical called La Bella Mimí. She was often in the tabloids as the rumored girlfriend of the most famous bullfighter of the time: Manuel Benítez (El Cordobés).

Miranda went on to appear in over 30 films from 1960 to 1970. There were epic adventures (Ursus, Cervantes); horror films (Sound of Horror, Pyro); dramas (Canción de cuna, Currito de la Cruz); comedies (Eva 63, La familia y uno más); and even a Spaghetti Western (Sugar Colt). She also released a couple of yé-yé pop records in the mid-1960s.

After taking two years off to raise her son (see "Personal life"), she returned to acting with a role in the western 100 Rifles (1969). She went on to appear in additional films and in Spanish television shows. Director Jess Franco, for whom Miranda had done a small role in his musical Queen of the Tabarin Club, made Miranda his frequent star in films including Count Dracula, Eugenie de Sade, Vampyros Lesbos, She Killed in Ecstasy, Nightmares Come at Night, and The Devil Came from Akasava. Since Franco's films involved extensive full-frontal nudity, Miranda took the stage name Susann Korda (alternately spelled Susan Korday or Susan Korda) during this period.

=== Personal life and death ===
In 1964, Miranda had made a trio of films in Portugal. José Manuel da Conceiçao Simões, a Portuguese racecar driver, was a producer and also acted in them. In one of the films, Un día en Lisboa (A Day in Lisbon), they played a couple traveling between Estoril and Lisbon. After a secret courtship, the pair married in 1966. In April 1967, Miranda gave birth to a son, Antonio. Her husband retired from racing and took a job in the auto industry.

On the morning of 18 August 1970, after completing the filming of The Devil Came from Akasava, Miranda and her husband were involved in a collision with a small truck near Lisbon. Simões suffered minor injuries, but Miranda died as a result of major head and back trauma. She and Jess Franco had started filming her next project (Justine, a.k.a. Juliette) which he abandoned after her death. He had also planned to feature her in his 1970 film, X312 - Flight to Hell, which he made later with a different actress.

== Legacy ==
Italian writer Cristiana Astori's novel Tutto quel nero, published in 2011 as part of Il Giallo Mondadori, follows a university student, Susanna Marino, in her search for a rare print of Un día en Lisboa; Miranda is featured prominently in the narrative. The first in a series of five novels dealing with Susanna's hunts for rare and lost films, Tutto quel nero was published as All That Black with an English translation by Australian writer Patrick Moroney through Sticking Place Books in May 2026.

Filmmaker Sean Baker gave a "special thanks" credit to Miranda and Franco in his 2024 film Anora due to its lead character, Ani (Mikey Madison), prominently wearing a red scarf inspired by the one worn by Miranda in Vampyros Lesbos.

== Filmography ==
- - directed by Jess Franco
- 1960 Queen of the Tabarin Club as Duchess (uncredited) *
- 1961 Ursus aka Ursus, Son of Hercules as Fillide
- 1961 La bella Mimí as first dancer
- 1961 Canción de cuna as Teresa
- 1963 The Castilian as Maria Estevez
- 1963 Eva 63 as Soledad
- 1963 Cuatro bodas y pico as Mari-Luci
- 1963 Bochorno as Piluca
- 1963 The Daughters of Helena as Mari Pó
- 1964 Pyro... The Thing Without a Face as Liz Frade
- 1964 Los gatos negros / A canção da Saudade as Babá
- 1964 Un día en Lisboa as Herself (documentary short)
- 1964 Fin de semana (Weekend) as Sonsoles
- 1964 Sound of Horror as Maria
- 1965 Playa de Formentor as Sandra
- 1965 Currito of the Cross as Rocío Carmona
- 1965 La familia y uno más as Patricia
- 1966 He's My Man! as Leonor Jiménez
- 1966 The Mimí del Franval as Susan
- 1966 Sugar Colt as Josefa
- 1967 Cervantes as Nessa
- 1968 Comanche blanco as India (uncredited)
- 1969 100 Rifles as girl in hotel
- 1969 Estudio amueblado 2-P as Maribel
- 1969 Soltera y madre en la vida as Paloma
- 1969 Lola la piconera as Rosarillo
- 1969 Nightmares Come at Night (as neighbor's girlfriend)*
- 1969 Sex Charade as Anne (a lost film, never released)*
- 1970 Count Dracula as Lucy Westenra*
- 1970 Cuadecuc/Vampir (documentary) as Herself*
- 1970 Vampyros Lesbos aka "Las Vampiras" as Countess Nadine Carody (as Susann Korda)*
- 1970 She Killed in Ecstasy (a.k.a. Mrs. Hyde) as Mrs. Johnson*
- 1970 The Devil Came from Akasava as Jane Morgan*
- 1970 Juliette (uncompleted, a lost film)*
- 1973 Eugenie de Sade as Eugénie Radeck de Franval (billed as Susan Korday in the opening credits).*

== Discography ==
- Soledad Miranda – Belter 51.451 (1964)
- Soledad Miranda – Belter 51.598 (1965)

== Literature ==
- Brown, Amy: Soledad Miranda: A Treasure Lost, in: Sirens of Cinema Magazine, Winter 2003
- Lucas, Tim: The Black Stare of Soledad Miranda, in European Trash Cinema, 1991
- Overzier, Gregor: Soledad Miranda/Susann Korda, in: Norbert Stresau, Heinrich Wimmer (Hrg.): Enzyklopädie des phantastischen Films, 70. Ergänzungslieferung, Corian, Meitingen 2004
