= Sigi Schwab =

German guitar player and teacher (1940–2024)

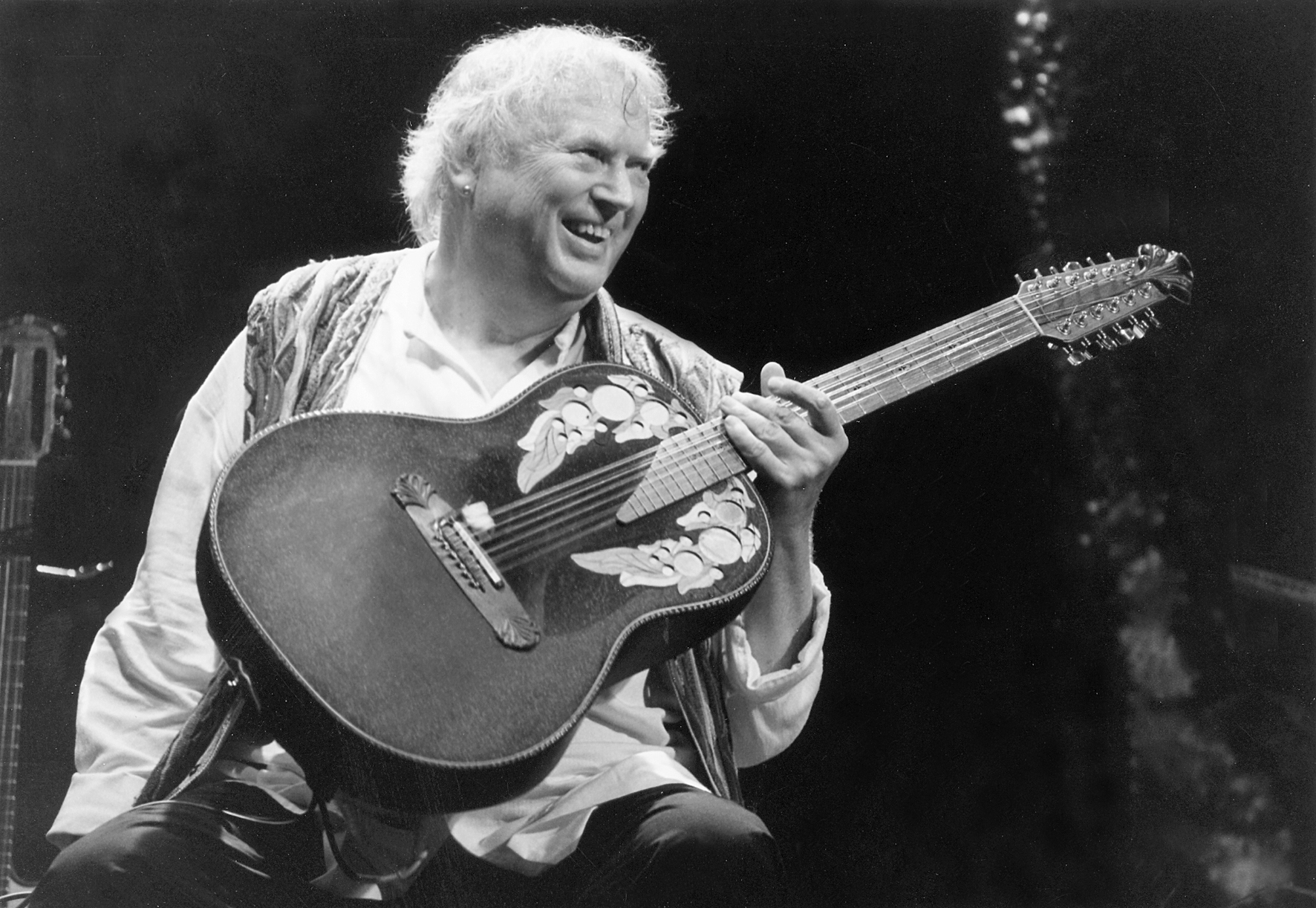
Schwab performing at the Tollwood Festival

Siegfried "Sigi" Schwab (5 August 1940 – 11 January 2024) was a German guitar player and teacher, having performed on more than 15,000 recordings for film, television, and as an accompanist to various artists. He played in a wide variety of styles, including baroque and jazz. Schwab played in German groups like Et Cetera (German band), Embryo, and with Ramesh Shotham. In 1980 Schwab played with Chris Hinze at the 5th North Sea Jazz Festival. Born in Ludwigshafen on 5 August 1940, Schwab died on 11 January 2024, at the age of 83.

== Bands ==
- Et Cetera with Wolfgang Dauner (p), Eberhard Weber(b), Fred Braceful, Roland Wittig (dr)
- Embryo with Christian Burchard (dr-perc), Mal Waldron (p), Dave King (b)
- Diabelli Trio with Willy Freivogel (fl), Enrique Santiago (vla)
- Guitarissimo with Peter Horton (g)
- Percussion Academia with Freddie Santiago and Guillermo Marchena (dr-perc)
- Percussion Project with Ramesh Shotham and Andreas Keller (dr-perc)
- Mandala duo with Ramesh Shotham

== Discography ==
- Fabulous Guitar (Philips, 1967)
- Remember Django Reinhardt (Metronome, 1968)
- Sound Music Album 8 (Golden Ring, 1975)
- Frei Wie Ein Vogel im Wind (Abakus, 1976)
- Sound Music Album 14 (Golden Ring, 1977)
- Sound Service 1 (Abakus, 1978)
- Guitarissimo with Peter Horton (Nature, 1978)
- Wide and Blue with Chris Hinze (Musicians, 1978)
- Capriccios, Divertimenti, Miniaturen (Melosmusik, 1978)
- Guitar Special 12 Landler (Melosmusik, 1978)
- Meditation (Melosmusik, 1979)
- Siegfried Schwab's Little Flowers (Hor Zu/EMI, 1979)
- Sound Music Album 22 (Golden Ring, 1979)
- Guitarissimo/Confianca with Peter Horton (Nature, 1980)
- It's Ragtime (Jupiter, 1980)
- Plays Paul Simon (Global, 1980)
- Guitaristics (Melosmusik, 1981)
- Hofkonzert (Metronome, 1982)
- Musique de Cour en Allemagne (Ades, 1982)
- Total Musik (Keytone, 1982)
- Solo's, Duo's and Trio's (Keytone, 1982)
- Backstage with Chris Hinze (Keytone, 1983)
- Meditation Vol. 2 (Melosmusik, 1986)
- Anna (Teldec, 1987)
- Sound Music Album 56 Gitarre (Golden Ring, 1988)
- Amazonas (Melosmusik, 1992)
- Clara (EastWest, 1993)
- Guitarissimo XL with Peter Horton (Solo Musica, 2014)
