= Ewa Strömberg =

Swedish actress

- Born: 13 January 1940; Bromma, Stockholm, Sweden
- Died: 24 January 2013 (aged 73); Stockholm, Sweden
- Other name: Eva Louise Strömberg
- Occupation: Actress
- Years active: 1959–1973

Eva Louise Strömberg (13 January 1940 – 24 January 2013), was a Swedish actress. Strömberg was born in Bromma, Stockholm in 1940. In the late 1960s, she would appear in a number of Edgar Wallace film adaptations such as Alfred Vohrer's The College Girl Murders (1967) and The Man with the Glass Eye (1969). She would appear in five films with director Jesús Franco, with the last being The Vengeance of Dr. Mabuse (1971). She died in Stockholm in 2013.

== Biography ==
Eva Louise Strömberg was born on January 13, 1940 in Bromma, Stockholm. In the late 1960s, she would make a number of Edgar Wallace film adaptations in West Germany such as Alfred Vohrer's The Monk with the Whip (1967) and The Man with the Glass Eye (1969). She appeared in Robert Siodmak's final film The Last Roman as Rauthgundis. The film was first released in two parts first in 1968 and 1969 and then later released in the United States with both films edited down to one in 1973.

She was cast in Jesús Franco's Vampyros Lesbos (1971) at the request of the German producers. She would make five films with Franco, with the last being The Vengeance of Dr. Mabuse (1971).

Strömberg died on January 24, 2013 in Stockholm.

== Selected filmography ==
Film performances
Year	Title	Role	Notes
1959	Raggare!	A girl at the 7 Sekel restaurant	
1959	Rider in Blue	Unnamed role	
1963	To Bed or Not to Bed	Unnamed role	
1964	En historia till fredag	The girl under the chestnut tree	Television film
1965	Ett sommaräventyr	Kristina, photomodel	
1966	Wie lernt man Mädchen kennen...?	Unknown role	Television film
1967	Mördaren – en helt vanlig person	Pia	
1967	The College Girl Murders	Pam Walsbury	
1968	Im Banne des Unheimlichen	Library Clerk	
1968	Erotik auf der Schulbank	English teacher Miss Horn	
1968	Heimlichkeiten	Britta	
1968	Kampf um Rom. 1. Teil	Rauthgundis	
1969	The Man with the Glass Eye	Doris	
1969	Kampf um Rom. 2. Teil	Rauthgundis	
1969	The Wedding Trip	Kay	
1971	The Devil Came from Akasava	Ingrid Thorsson	
1971	Vampyros Lesbos	Linda Westinghouse	
1971	X312 - Flight to Hell	Mrs. Wilson	
1971	She Killed in Ecstasy	Dr. Crawford	
1971	The Vengeance of Dr. Mabuse	Jennifer Paganini, aka 'Jennifer Herring the Pussy Cat'	
1972	Zum zweiten Frühstück: Heiße Liebe	Green widow	
1972	Hochzeitsnacht-Report	Berta	
1973	Det går i sextakt	Unknown role	
