= Jesús Franco =

Spanish filmmaker, composer, and actor (1930–2013)

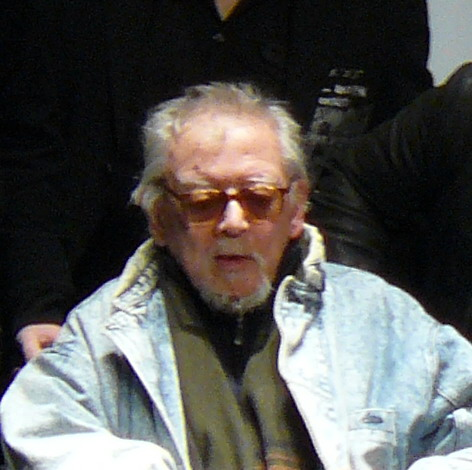
- Franco at the 2008 Fantastic'Arts festival, Gérardmer, France
- Born: Jesús Franco Manera; 12 May 1930; Madrid, Spain
- Died: 2 April 2013 (aged 82); Málaga, Andalusia, Spain
- Education: Madrid Royal Conservatory; Instituto Ramiro de Maeztu; Escuela Oficial de Cine; Institut des hautes études cinématographiques
- Occupations: Director; screenwriter; producer; cinematographer; musician; composer; actor; editor
- Years active: 1954–2013
- Spouses: Nicole Guettard (c. 1962–1980); Lina Romay (m. 2008)
- Children: Caroline Riviere (stepdaughter from first marriage)
- Relatives: Julián Marías (brother-in-law); Ricardo Franco (nephew)

Jesús Franco Manera (12 May 1930 – 2 April 2013), also commonly known as Jess Franco, was a Spanish filmmaker, composer, and actor, known as a highly prolific director of low-budget exploitation and B-movies. He worked in many different genres during his career, but was best known for his horror and erotic films, often incorporating surrealist elements.

In a career spanning from 1954 to 2013, he wrote, directed, produced, acted in, and scored approximately 173 feature films, (Note: Sources list only 173 films in Franco's filmography. Other titles listed were simply re-edited or censored versions of the same films, adapted for different markets.) working in his native Spain as well as (during the rule of Francisco Franco) in France, West Germany, Switzerland, Portugal and Italy. Additionally, during the 1960s, he made several films in Brazil and Istanbul.

Franco's films are known for his distinctive visual style and idiosyncratic approach to production, often directing multiple films concurrently. Despite mixed critical reception during his lifetime, Franco's work has gained a dedicated cult following, and he is regarded as a significant figure in the history of exploitation cinema. In 2009, he received an Honorary Goya Award from the Academy of Cinematographic Arts and Sciences of Spain for his contributions to Spanish cinema.

== Early life and education ==
Jesús Franco Manera was born in Madrid on 12 May 1930, to a prominent family of Cuban and Mexican origin. His brother, Enrique, was the vice president of the Albéniz Foundation. Via his sister Dolores, Franco was the brother-in-law of philosopher Julián Marías, and the uncle of filmmaker Ricardo Franco.

A lifelong jazz enthusiast and pianist, Franco studied music at the Madrid Royal Conservatory and the Instituto Ramiro de Maeztu, before embarking on a film career. He studied at Madrid's Instituto de Investigaciones y Experiencias Cinematográficas (now Escuela Oficial de Cine), and the Institut des hautes études cinématographiques (now La Fémis) in Paris. He cited among his influences Luis Buñuel, Stanley Donen, Vincente Minnelli, and Orson Welles.

During this time, he supported himself by working as a pianist in nightclubs and writing pulp novels under the pen name 'David Khune', which he later adopted as one of his directing aliases. He also directed stage plays.

== Career ==
Franco began his career in 1954 (aged 24) as an assistant director in the Spanish film industry, performing many tasks including composing music for some films as well as co-writing a number of the screenplays. He assisted directors such as Joaquín Luis Romero Marchent, León Klimovsky and Juan Antonio Bardem. After working on more than 20 films for other directors, he decided to get into directing films himself in 1959, making a few musicals and a crime drama called Red Lips.

In 1960, Franco took Marius Lesoeur and Sergio Newman, two producer friends, to a cinema to see the newly released Hammer horror film The Brides of Dracula and the three men decided to go into the horror film business. His career took off in 1962 with The Awful Dr. Orloff (a.k.a. Gritos en la noche), which received wide distribution in the USA and the United Kingdom. Franco wrote and directed Orloff, and even supplied some of the music for the film. In the mid-1960s, he went on to direct two other horror films, then proceeded to turn out a number of James Bond-like spy thrillers, including Lucky, the Inscrutable (1967), and softcore sex films based on the works of the Marquis de Sade (which remained one of his major influences throughout his career).

Although he had some American box office success with Necronomicon - Geträumte Sünden (1968), 99 Women (1969) and two 1969 Christopher Lee films – The Bloody Judge and Count Dracula – he never achieved wide commercial success. Many of his films were only distributed in Europe, and most of them were never dubbed into English.

=== With Soledad Miranda ===
After discovering Soledad Miranda (he first used her in his film Count Dracula), Franco moved from Spain to France in 1969 so that he could make more violent and erotic films free of the strict censorship in Spain at the time, and it was at this point that his career began to go downhill commercially as he turned to low-budget filmmaking with an accent on adult material. Miranda starred in a series of six erotic thrillers for Franco, all made within a one-year period (one of which, Sex Charade, was never released), after which she was killed in a tragic automobile accident in Portugal in 1970 just as her career was taking off. She and Franco had started filming her next project (Justine) which he abandoned entirely after her death. (Only about 40 minutes of the movie was shot at the time of her death). He had also planned to feature her in his next film, X312: Flight to Hell, which he made with another actress.

=== With Lina Romay ===
A year or two after Miranda died, a grieving Franco discovered a new leading lady in actress Lina Romay. At the time, the teenage Romay was married to a young actor/photographer named Ramon Ardid (aka "Raymond Hardy"), who co-starred with Lina in 19 Franco films in the 1970s. But as Romay and Franco became more involved in their film projects together over the years, her marriage to Ardid broke up in 1975 and ended in divorce in 1978 (Ardid continued working with Franco however until 1979).

In the adult film Sexorcismes (1975), Franco was involved in a non-simulated sex scene with Romay.

Franco was married at the time to Nicole Guettard (their marriage running approximately from 1962 to 1980), Ms. Guettard being gradually replaced in Franco's life by Romay. Guettard worked as a script consultant on some of Franco's films while they were married (sometimes credited as Nicole Franco), and even acted in a few of them. Her daughter from an earlier marriage, Caroline Riviere, also acted in a few Franco films in the early 1970s (including the risqué Exorcisme and The Perverse Countess). Guettard died in 1996.

Franco and Romay worked together for 40 years. While they had started living together in 1980, they officially married on 25 April 2008. Until her death in 2012 (from cancer, aged 57), Romay was his most regular actress, as well as his life companion and muse. Romay starred in approximately 109 Jesús Franco films, more than any other actor or actress. Although Romay was listed in the credits of several films as a co-director, actor Antonio Mayans stated in a 2015 interview that Franco used to credit her in that manner for business reasons, although she never actually co-directed any of their films together.

Although he produced a number of relatively successful horror films in the early 1970s (Dracula vs. Frankenstein, The Bare-Breasted Countess, A Virgin Among the Living Dead), many people in the industry considered him a porn director due to the huge number of X-rated adult films he began turning out (even his 1970s horror films featured abundant nudity). Franco returned to low-budget horror films in a brief comeback period from 1980 to 1983 (Mondo Cannibale, Bloody Moon, Oasis of the Zombies, Mansion of the Living Dead and Revenge in the House of Usher), but after 1983, his career took a second downturn as he returned to making mostly pornographic films, most of which left nothing to the imagination.

In his later years, he did, however, get the opportunity to turn out two rather big-budget horror films – Faceless (1988) and Killer Barbys (1996) – both of which showed what great work he could still do when his projects were adequately funded. The entirety of his work after 1996 (beginning with Tender Flesh) was shot-on-video films of very low quality, none of which were distributed theatrically. Romay died of cancer in 2012 at age 57, after which Franco died on April 2, 2013, from natural causes at age 82.

=== Zombie Lake vs. Oasis of the Zombies ===
Franco was supposed to write and direct a film for Eurocine Productions in 1980 called Lake of the Living Dead (a horror film about revived Nazi zombies) but after submitting the basic plot summary, he fell out with the producers, Marius and Daniel Lesoeur, over the ridiculously low budget he was allotted, and the producers immediately hired French horror film director Jean Rollin to direct it (later re-titling it Zombie Lake).

The Lesoeurs later had Rollin shoot new (zombie) footage in 1981 to be added to Franco's A Virgin Among the Living Dead (1973) for its 1981 theatrical rerelease. Franco's original director's cut of the film was later made available on DVD.

Franco later directed another film for the Lesouers called Oasis of the Zombies (a.k.a. Bloodsucking Nazi Zombies on VHS) in 1981, which had a plot very similar to Zombie Lake (also involving revived Nazi zombies). It was released in France as The Abyss of the Living Dead. Franco simultaneously shot a variant Spanish-language version of Oasis of the Zombies at the producers' expense, starring Lina Romay and his "regulars", which was apparently released only in Spain in 1982 as La Tumba de los Muertos Vivientes.

== Filmmaking style and themes ==
Franco sometimes worked under various pseudonyms, including David Khune and Frank Hollmann. A fan of jazz music (and a musician himself), many of his pseudonyms were taken from jazz musicians such as Clifford Brown and James P. Johnson.

Franco's themes often revolved around lesbian vampires, women in prison, surgical horror, sadomasochism, zombies and sexploitation (including numerous films based on the writings of the Marquis de Sade). He worked in other exploitation film genres, such as cannibal films, spy films, giallo, crime films, science fiction, jungle adventure, Oriental menace, exorcist films, war movies, historical dramas and nunsploitation. His sex movies often contained long, uninterrupted shots of nude women writhing around on beds. Most of his hardcore films starred his lifelong companion Lina Romay (sometimes billed as "Candy Coster" or "Lulu Laverne"), who admitted in interviews to being an exhibitionist.

Franco was known for his use of a hand-held camera and zoom shots, which he felt lent realism to his films. He also was not averse to filming several movies at the same time, knocking together a second feature on the unsuspecting producer's dime. Many of his actors only found out years after the fact that Franco had actually starred them in films for which they had never even been paid.

His main claim to fame, however, is that he managed to direct approximately 173 motion pictures in his lifetime, encompassing a wide swathe of different genres with practically no financial backing available to him. (Note: Some sources which list as many as 200 titles in Franco's filmography are relisting the same films several times under their different variant titles.)

Sometimes referred to as the "European Ed Wood", Franco similarly attracted a circle of bizarre but loyal actors and technicians who moved with him over the years from project to project (while receiving very little, if any, money for their efforts). Many of his actors were over-the-hill performers in the twilight of their careers, many of his actresses brazen exhibitionists. He frequently worked with genre actors Lina Romay (who appeared in 109 Franco films), Antonio Mayans (who appeared in 50 Franco films), Howard Vernon (who appeared in 40 Franco films), Paul Müller (who appeared in 15 Franco films), Monica Swinn (who appeared in 15 Franco films), and Christopher Lee (who appeared in 7 Franco films). His frequent cast members also included Jack Taylor, Ewa Strömberg, Anne Libert, Soledad Miranda, Maria Rohm, William Berger, Dennis Price, Olivier Mathot, Muriel Montosse (a.k.a. Victoria Adams), Alice Arno, Montserrat Prous, Alberto Dalbés, Britt Nichols, Pamela Stanford, Mabel Escaño, Kali Hansa, Carmen Carrión and Klaus Kinski, all of whom are well known to Euro horror film historians.

== Music ==
As he was a musician himself, music played an important role in many of his films. Especially during his Euro-Sexfilm heyday in the 1970s, a groovy, Jazz-heavy soundtrack often merged with the film's plot, and striptease or dance scenes were particularly emphasized by the musical performance in films such as “Midnight Party,” “Vampyros Lesbos,” and “Blue Rita.” Music of composers as Daniel J. White or Gerhard Heinz was used or has been exclusively composed for various soundtracks, but few of the soundtracks were released on vinyl or later on CD.

== Death ==
Franco suffered a severe stroke on 27 March 2013. He was taken to a hospital in Málaga, Spain, where he died six days later, on the morning of 2 April. Franco was 82.

== See also ==
- Jesús Franco's unrealized projects
