= Jesús Franco filmography =

Jesús Franco (1930–2013) was a Spanish filmmaker. At a young age, Franco had a passion for comics and music, and followed his love of music, specifically jazz. After his father found out about him working as a jazz musician, he enrolled him a religious university in 1949. He later left these studies and went to the Madrid Royal Conservatory and then travelling to Paris in 1951 to where he wrote articles on stories which would be applied in his later films.

In the early 1950s, he went to school at the Instituto de Investigaciones y Experiencias Cinematográficas (IIEC), later known as the Escuela Oficial de Cinematografía He was suspended from this school in his second year, and later briefly enrolled in the Institut des hautes études cinématographiques in Paris. By the mid-1950s, he was struggling to become a filmmaker. He immediately became an assistant director for filmmakers such as Juan Antonio Bardem, Joaquín Luis Romero Marchent and León Klimovsky. Towards the late 1950s, he began directing his own short films. He directed his first feature film Tenemos 18 años in 1959 which was first released in 1961. In the early 1960s Franco had was described in the Spanish press as a stylish, talented, sometimes provocative filmmaker. As his films became more provactive with their elements of eroticism and violence, he would leave Spain in 1969 and only return in 1979 after living and working in both France and Switzerland. During this period, Franco would make films with popular actors such as Christopher Lee and Klaus Kinski. A vast number of his films, were made with his muse Lina Romay, whom he first met in 1971 and married in 2008.

On returning to Spain, he found himself working with the lowest budgets of his career yet, leading him to make nearly 50 very low-budget features between 1980 and 1985. Between 1985 and 1990 his work ranged from hardcore pornography to more traditional filmmaking with French film productions featuring actors like Christopher Lee and Mark Hamill. In the early 1990s, Franco's production work slowed down. Following the release of Killer Barbys (1996), he began on several projects again that were prominently shot-on-video projects.

In 2008, the Spanish Academy of Motion Picture Arts and Sciences announced it would award Franco the 2008 Lifetime Achievement Goya Award for "his extensive, rich and varied filmography, as well as his absolute dedication to the profession." On accepting it, Franco dedicated the award to Juan Antonio Bardem, his partner Lina Romay, and to the Paris Cinémathéque. Franco died in Málaga on 2 April 2013 at the age of 82. His final film Al Pereira vs. the Alligator Ladies (2013), premiered in Barcelona just two weeks before his death.

== Production credits ==
Many of Jesús Franco's films were distributed with a consistent delay after their shooting often due to economic reasons as well systems related to Spanish rebate system.

The films are listed by their year of first release and the years when the film were being shot to assist in understanding the chronology of Franco's films. Films are listed by their most common English language title, whether it be home video or theatrical. When no English title is available, the title the film uses its original release from its predominant production country.

=== Feature films ===
| Title | Shooting Years | Release Year | Credited as | | | | Notes | Ref(s) |
| Title | Shooting Years | Release Year | Director | Writer | Music | Other | Notes | Ref(s) |
|---|---|---|---|---|---|---|---|---|
| Death of a Cyclist | 1954 | 1955 | | | | Yes | Assistant director | |
| Tenemos 18 años | 1959 | 1961 | Yes | Yes | Yes | | | |
| Labios rojos | 1960 | 1961 | Yes | Yes | Yes | | | |
| La reina del Tabarín | 1960 | 1960 | Yes | Yes | | | | |
| Vampiresas 1930 (volando hacia la fama) | 1960-1961 | 1961 | Yes | Yes | Yes | | Credited with "additional dialogue" | |
| The Awful Dr. Orloff | 1961 | 1962 | Yes | Yes | Yes | | Credited for writing the films songs | |
| La venganza del Zorro | —N/a | 1962 | | Yes | | | | |
| Death Whistles the Blues | 1962 | 1964 | Yes | Yes | Yes | | Credited for writing the films jazz music, songs and lyrics | |
| The Sadistic Baron von Klaus | 1962-1963 | 1963 | Yes | Yes | Yes | Yes | Producer | |
| Rififi in the City | 1963 | 1964 | Yes | Yes | | | | |
| El llanero | 1963 | 1964 | Yes | Yes | | | | |
| Dr. Orloff's Monster | 1964 | 1965 | Yes | Yes | | | | |
| Chimes at Midnight | 1964-1965 | 1966 | | | | Yes | Second-unit director | |
| Espionage in Lisbon | 1965 | 1965 | | Yes | Yes | | | |
| The Diabolical Dr. Z | 1965 | 1966 | Yes | Yes | | | | |
| Attack of the Robots | 1965 | 1966 | Yes | Yes | | | | |
| Golden Horn | 1966 | 1968 | Yes | Yes | | | | |
| Lucky el intrépido | 1966 | 1967 | Yes | Yes | | | | |
| Succubus | 1967 | 1968 | Yes | | | Yes | Franco has stated he edited the film. | |
| Two Undercover Angels | 1967 | 1969 | Yes | Yes | | | | |
| Kiss Me Monster | 1967 | 1969 | Yes | Yes | | | | |
| The Blood of Fu Manchu | 1967 | 1968 | Yes | Yes | | | | |
| The Girl From Rio | 1968 | 1969 | Yes | | | | | |
| 99 Women | 1968 | 1969 | Yes | Yes | | | | |
| Marquis de Sade's Justine | 1968 | 1969 | Yes | Yes | | | | |
| The Castle of Fu Manchu | 1968 | 1969 | Yes | | | | | |
| Venus in Furs | 1968 | 1969 | Yes | Yes | | | | |
| Eugenie… The Story of Her Journey into Perversion | 1969 | 1970 | Yes | | | | | |
| The Bloody Judge | 1969 | 1970 | Yes | Yes | | | | |
| Nightmares Come at Night | 1969-1970 | 1973 | Yes | Yes | | | | |
| Count Dracula | 1969 | 1970 | Yes | Yes | | | | |
| Eugénie de Sade | 1970 | 1973 | Yes | Yes | | | | |
| Vampyros Lesbos | 1970 | 1971 | Yes | Yes | | | | |
| She Killed in Ecstasy | 1970 | 1971 | Yes | Yes | | | | |
| The Devil Came from Akasava | 1970 | 1971 | Yes | Yes | | | | |
| X312 - Flight to Hell | 1970 | 1971 | Yes | Yes | | | | |
| The Deadly Avenger of Soho | 1971 | 1972 | Yes | Yes | | | | |
| The Vengeance of Dr. Mabuse | 1971 | 1972 | Yes | Yes | | | | |
| Jungfrauen-report | 1971 | 1972 | Yes | Yes | | | | |
| Sexy Darlings | 1971 | 1972 | Yes | Yes | | | | |
| A Virgin Among the Living Dead | 1971 | 1973 | Yes | Yes | | | | |
| Dracula, Prisoner of Frankenstein | 1971 | 1972 | Yes | Yes | | | | |
| Daughter of Dracula | 1972 | 1972 | Yes | Yes | Yes | | Credited for additional music | |
| Los amantes de la isla del Diablo | 1972 | 1973 | Yes | Yes | | | | |
| The Erotic Rites of Frankenstein | 1972-1973 | 1973 | Yes | Yes | | | | |
| The Demons | 1972 | 1973 | Yes | Yes | Yes | | | |
| Un capitan de quince aňos | 1972 | 1973 | Yes | Yes | | | | |
| Un silencio de tumba | 1972 | 1976 | Yes | Yes | | | | |
| Diary of a Nymphomaniac | 1972 | 1973 | Yes | Yes | | | | |
| The Sinister Eyes of Dr. Orloff | 1973 | 1978 | Yes | Yes | | Yes | Uncredited as a producer | |
| How to Seduce a Virgin | 1973 | 1974 | Yes | Yes | | | | |
| Countess Perverse | 1973-1974 | 1974 | Yes | Yes | | | | |
| The Lustful Amazons | 1973-1974 | 1974 | Yes | Yes | | | | |
| Les Gloutonnes | 1973 | 1975 | Yes | Yes | | | | |
| The Other Side of the Mirror | 1973 | 1975 | Yes | Yes | | | | |
| Female Vampire | 1973-1974 | 1975 | Yes | | | Yes | Director of photography, editor | |
| Night of the Skull | 1973 | 1974 | Yes | Yes | | | | |
| The Hot Nights of Linda | 1973-1974 | 1975 | Yes | | | | | |
| Tender and Perverse Emanuelle | 1973-1974 | 1978 | Yes | | | | | |
| Kiss Me Killer | 1973-1974 | 1977 | Yes | | | | | |
| Exorcism | 1974 | 1974 | Yes | | | | | |
| Celestine, Maid at Your Service | 1974 | 1974 | Yes | | | | | |
| Lorna the Exorcist | 1974 | 1974 | Yes | | | | | |
| Les Chatouilleuses | 1974 | 1975 | Yes | | | | | |
| Les Jouisseur | 1974 | 1975 | Yes | | | | | |
| Les Grandes Emmerdeuses | 1974 | 1975 | Yes | | | | | |
| Julietta 69 | 1974-1975 | 1976 | Yes | | | Yes | Director of photography | |
| Midnight Party | 1975 | 1976 | Yes | Yes | | Yes | Director of photography, camera operator, lyrics writer | |
| Shining Sex | 1975 | 1976 | Yes | Yes | | Yes | Director of photography, camera operator, film editor | |
| Racket on Pleasure | 1975-1976 | 1976 | | | | Yes | Footage Franco directed appears in the film | |
| Barbed Wire Dolls | 1975 | 1976 | Yes | Yes | | Yes | Director of photography | |
| Women Behind Bars | 1975 | 1977 | Yes | Yes | | Yes | Director of photography | |
| Downtown | 1975 | 1976 | Yes | Yes | | Yes | Director of photography | |
| Die Sklavinnen | 1975-1976 | 1977 | Yes | Yes | | Yes | Director of photography, camera operator | |
| Die Marquise de Sade | 1975 | 1976 | Yes | Yes | | Yes | Director of photography, camera operator | |
| Girls of the Night Traffic | 1976 | 1976 | Yes | | | | | |
| Weisse haut auf schwarzen schenkeln | 1976 | 1976 | Yes | | | | | |
| In 80 betten um die welt | 1976 | 1977 | Yes | | | | | |
| Jack the Ripper | 1976 | 1976 | Yes | Yes | | | | |
| Ilsa the Wicked Warden | 1976 | 1977 | Yes | Yes | | | | |
| Love Letters of a Portuguese Nun | 1976 | 1977 | Yes | Yes | | | Uncredited as the story author | |
| Blue Rita | 1977 | 1977 | Yes | | | | | |
| Sexy Sisters | 1977 | 1977 | Yes | | | | | |
| Love Camp | 1977 | 1977 | Yes | | | | | |
| Voodoo Passion | 1977 | 1977 | Yes | Yes | | | Uncredited screenwriter | |
| Wicked Women | 1977 | 1978 | Yes | | | | | |
| Women in Cellblock 9 | 1977 | 1978 | Yes | | | | | |
| Cocktail spcéial | 1977 | 1978 | Yes | Yes | | Yes | Director of photography, camera operator | |
| Elles font tout | 1978 | 1979 | Yes | Yes | | Yes | Director of photography, camera operator | |
| Je brûle de partout | 1978 | 1979 | Yes | Yes | | Yes | Director of photography, camera operator | |
| Ópalo de fuego (mercaderes del sexo) | 1978-1979 | 1980 | Yes | Yes | Yes | Yes | Film editor, director of photography, camera operator | |
| The Girls of Copacabana | 1978-1979 | 1981 | Yes | Yes | | Yes | Director of photography, camera operator | |
| The Sadist of Notre Dame | 1974, 1979 | 1981 | Yes | Yes | | Yes | Director of photography, camera operator | |
| Sinfornia erótica | 1979 | 1980 | Yes | Yes | Yes | Yes | Camera operator | |
| The Cannibals | 1979 | 1981 | Yes | | Yes | | | |
| El sexo está loco | 1980 | 1981 | Yes | | Yes | Yes | Uncredited for music, camera operator and film editor | |
| Aberraciones Sexuales de una Mujer Casada | 1980 | 1981 | Yes | Yes | Yes | | Uncredited for music | |
| Eugénie historia de una perversión | 1980 | 1981 | Yes | Yes | Yes | Yes | Uncredited camera operator | |
| Strike Back | 1980 | 1981 | | | | Yes | Assistant director | |
| Devil Hunter | 1980 | 1980 | Yes | Yes | Yes | Yes | Uncredited camera operator | |
| Sadomania | 1980 | 1981 | Yes | Yes | Yes | Yes | Film editor | |
| Bloody Moon | 1980 | 1981 | Yes | | | Yes | Uncredited 1st camera operator | |
| Captive Women | 1981 | 1981 | Yes | | | Yes | Uncredited editor and 1st camera operator | |
| Pick-up Girls | 1981 | 1981 | Yes | Yes | | Yes | Uncredited editor and 1st camera operator | |
| El Lago de los Virgenes | 1981 | 1982 | Yes | Yes | | Yes | Uncredited camera operator | |
| Macumba Sexual | 1981 | 1982 | Yes | Yes | Yes | Yes | Director of photography, uncredited for music, 1st camera operator, and editor | |
| Zombie Lake | —N/a | 1981 | | Yes | | | | |
| La noche de los sexos abiertos | 1981 | 1982 | Yes | Yes | Yes | | Uncredited for music and camera operator | |
| Oasis of the Zombies | 1981-1982 | —N/a | Yes | | | Yes | Camera operator | |
| Confesiones íntimas de una exhibicionista | 1981 | 1983 | Yes | Yes | | Yes | Director of photography | |
| Botas negras, latigo de cuero | 1982 | 1982 | Yes | Yes | Yes | Yes | Uncredited for music, film editor and camera operator | |
| El Siniestro Dr. Orloff | 1982 | 1983 | Yes | Yes | Yes | Yes | Uncredited for music, film editor | |
| La Casa de las Mujeres Perdidas | 1982 | 1983 | Yes | Yes | Yes | Yes | Uncredited for music, camera operator, film editor | |
| The Inconfessable Orgies of Emanuelle | 1982 | 1983 | Yes | Yes | | Yes | Uncredited camera operator, film editor | |
| El hotel de los ligues | 1982 | 1983 | Yes | Yes | | Yes | Uncredited camera operator, film editor | |
| Mansion of the Living Dead | 1982 | 1983 | Yes | Yes | Yes | Yes | Uncredited director of photography, music, camera operator and film editor | |
| La Sombra del judoka contra el Dr. Wong | 1982 | 1996 | Yes | Yes | Yes | Yes | Director of photography, camera operator. Uncredited for music, camera operator, film editing | |
| Gemidos de placer | 1982 | 1983 | Yes | Yes | Yes | Yes | Uncredited camera operator and film editor | |
| Los Blues de la calle pop | 1982 | —N/a | Yes | Yes | Yes | Yes | Director of photography. Uncredited as producer and camera operator | |
| Furia en el trópico | 1982 | 1986 | Yes | Yes | Yes | Yes | Director of photography. Uncredited camera operator and film editor | |
| Revenge in the House of Usher | 1982, 1984, 1988 | 1983 | Yes | | | Yes | Director of photography. Uncredited camera operator | |
| Diamonds of Kilimandjaro | 1982 | 1983 | Yes | Yes | Yes | Yes | Director of photography. Uncredited 1st camera operator | |
| Lilian (la virgen pervertida) | 1982 | 1984 | Yes | Yes | Yes | Yes | Director of photography. Uncredited for music, 1st camera operator, film editor | |
| Night Has a Thousand Desires | 1983 | 1983 | Yes | Yes | Yes | Yes | Director of photography. Uncredited for music, 1st camera operator, film editor | |
| Un pito para tres | 1983-1984 | 1985 | Yes | Yes | | Yes | Uncredited writer, director of photography, and film editor | |
| The Sexual Story of O | 1983 | 1983 | Yes | Yes | Yes | Yes | Director of photography. Uncredited for music, camera operator and film editor | |
| En busca del dragon dorado | 1983 | 1985 | Yes | Yes | Yes | Yes | Uncredited for music, camera operator and film editor | |
| Golden Temple Amazons | 1983 | 1990 | Yes | Yes | | | | |
| Camino solitario | 1983 | 1983 | Yes | Yes | Yes | Yes | Uncredited producer and camera operator | |
| Las chicas del tanga | 1983 | 1985 | Yes | Yes | | Yes | Uncredited producer, film editor, and camera operator | |
| Sola ante el terror | 1983 | 1986 | Yes | Yes | | Yes | Uncredited camera operator | |
| Sangre en mis zapatos | 1983 | 1986 | Yes | Yes | Yes | Yes | Uncredited writer, music, camera operator, and film editor | |
| Una rajita para dos | 1983 | 1984 | Yes | Yes | | Yes | Uncredited writer, and camera operator | |
| ¿Cuanto Cobra un Espia? | 1984 | 1984 | Yes | Yes | | Yes | Uncredited film editor and camera operator | |
| Juego sucio en Casablanca | 1984 | 1985 | Yes | | | Yes | Film editor. Uncredited film producer and camera operator | |
| Bahia blanca | 1984 | —N/a | Yes | | | Yes | Uncredited producer, film editor, and camera operator | |
| Las ultimas de Filipinas | 1984 | 1997 | Yes | Yes | | Yes | Director of photography. Uncredited co-producer, camera operator and film editor | |
| Viaje a Bangkok, atatúd incluido | 1984 | 1987 | Yes | Yes | | Yes | Uncredited co-producer, 1st camera operator and film editor | |
| Bangkok, cita con la muerte | 1984 | 1992 | Yes | Yes | | Yes | Uncredited camera operator and film editor | |
| La esclava bianca | 1985 | —N/a | Yes | | Yes | Yes | Director of photography. Uncredited camera operator, film editor and co-producer | |
| El ojete de Lulú | 1985 | 1985 | Yes | Yes | | Yes | Director of photography. Uncredited film editor | |
| El chupete de Lulú | 1985 | 1985 | Yes | Yes | | Yes | Director of photography. Uncredited film editor | |
| Entre pitos anda el juego | 1985 | 1985 | Yes | Yes | | Yes | Director of photography. Uncredited film editor | |
| El mirón y la exhibicionista | 1985 | 1986 | Yes | Yes | | Yes | Director of photography, camera operator. Uncredited film editor | |
| Las chuponas | 1982, 1984, 1985 | 1986 | Yes | Yes | | Yes | Director of photography. Uncredited film editor | |
| Para las nenas... leche calentita | 1985 | 1986 | Yes | Yes | | Yes | Director of photography. Uncredited film editor | |
| Esclavas del crimen | 1986 | —N/a | Yes | | | Yes | Uncredited camera operator and film editor | |
| Phollastia | 1987 | 1987 | Yes | Yes | | Yes | Director of photography, uncredited camera operator and film editor | |
| Phalo Crest | 1987 | 1988 | Yes | Yes | | Yes | Uncredited camera operator and film editor | |
| Dark Mission | 1987 | 1988 | Yes | Yes | | | | |
| Faceless | 1987-1988 | 1988 | Yes | Yes | | | | |
| Countdown to Esmeralda Bay | 1988 | 1988 | Yes | Yes | | Yes | Co-editor | |
| Fall of the Eagles | 1989 | —N/a | Yes | Yes | | Yes | Film editor, lyricist | |
| Downtown Heat | 1990 | 1995 | Yes | Yes | | Yes | Producer. Screened on Canal+ | |
| Killer Barbys | 1996 | 1996 | Yes | Yes | Yes | | | |
| Tender Flesh | 1996 | 1996 | Yes | Yes | Yes | Yes | Executive producer | |
| Mari-Cookie and the Killer Tarantula in 8 Legs to Love You | 1998 | 2001 | Yes | Yes | Yes | | Producer, uncredited director of photography. Released direct-to-video. | |
| Lust for Frankenstein | 1998 | 2001 | Yes | Yes | Yes | Yes | Producer. Released direct-to-video. | |
| Dr. Wong's Virtual Hell | 1998 | 2002 | Yes | Yes | Yes | Yes | Director of photography. Released direct-to-video. | |
| Vampire Blues | 1998 | 2002 | Yes | Yes | Yes | Yes | Director of photography. Released direct-to-video. | |
| Red Silk | 1999 | 2002 | Yes | Yes | Yes | Yes | Director of photography. Released direct-to-video. | |
| Broken Dolls | 1999 | 2004 | Yes | Yes | Yes | Yes | Director of photography. Released direct-to-video. | |
| Blind Target | 2000 | 2002 | Yes | Yes | Yes | Yes | Director of photography. Released direct-to-video. | |
| Helter Skelter | 2000 | 2004 | Yes | Yes | | Yes | Director of photography. Released direct-to-video. | |
| Vampire Junction | 2001 | 2002 | Yes | Yes | Yes | Yes | Director of photography. Released direct-to-video. | |
| Incubus | 2002 | 2002 | Yes | Yes | Yes | Yes | Uncredited director of photography. Released direct-to-video. | |
| Killer Barbys vs. Dracula | 2002 | 2002 | Yes | Yes | Yes | Yes | Uncredited director of photography. | |
| Passion | 2002 | 2005 | Yes | Yes | Yes | Yes | Uncredited executive producer, director of photography. Released direct-to-video. | |
| Peversion | 2002 | 2005 | Yes | Yes | Yes | Yes | Uncredited director of photography. Released direct-to-video. | |
| Snakewoman | 2005 | 2005 | Yes | Yes | Yes | Yes | Uncredited director of photography | |
| La cripta de las mujeres malditas | 2007-2008 | 2008 | Yes | Yes | | Yes | Producer, director of photography, film editor | |
| Paula-Paula | 2009 | 2011 | Yes | | | Yes | Camera operator, editing, special effects | |
| Al Pereira vs. the Alligator Ladies | 2012 | 2012 | Yes | Yes | Yes | Yes | Producer, film editor | |
| Revenge of the Alligator Ladies | 2012-2013 | 2013 | Yes | Yes | | | Film editor | |

=== Short films ===
| Title | Shooting Year | Release Year | Credited as | | | | Notes | Ref(s) |
| Title | Shooting Year | Release Year | Director | Writer | Music | Other | Notes | Ref(s) |
|---|---|---|---|---|---|---|---|---|
| Teoría del alba | 1953 | 1953 | Yes | | Yes | | While credited as a composer, the film is silent. | |
| El árbol de España | 1957 | 1959 | Yes | | | | | |
| Oro españal | 1957 | 1959 | Yes | Yes | Yes | | | |
| Sangre en la tribu | 1957 | 1958 | Yes | Yes | | | | |
| El bombero | 1957 | 1958 | Yes | Yes | | | | |
| El último gangster | 1957 | 1961 | Yes | Yes | | | | |
| La muerte de un hombre bajito | 1957 | 1961 | Yes | Yes | | | | |
| Estampas guipuzcoanas n. 2 (Pío Baroja) | 1959 | 1960 | Yes | | | | Documentary | |
| El huésped de la niebla | 1982 | —N/a | | | | Yes | Director of photography | |
| El Tren expreso | 1982 | —N/a | | | | Yes | Director of photography | |

== Performance credits ==
Jesús Franco's performances
| Release Year | Title | Role | Notes | Ref(s) |
|---|---|---|---|---|
| 1953 | Teoría del alba | Thief | Uncredited | |
| 1962 | The Awful Dr. Orloff | Piano player | Uncredited | |
| 1964 | Rififi in the City | Client at the Café Bolivar | Uncredited | |
| 1964 | Death Whistles the Blues | Saxophone player | Uncredited | |
| 1964 | El llanero | Sentinel | Uncredited | |
| 1965 | El extraño viaje | Venancio | | |
| 1965 | Dr. Orloff's Monster | Piano player | Uncredited | |
| 1966 | Attack of the Robots | Pianist at Bourbon's Club | Uncredited | |
| 1967 | Lucky el intrépido | Blind man selling postcards, Zoltan, guitar player at Lo Pagán | Uncredited in three roles | |
| 1968 | Golden Horn | Pianist | Uncredited | |
| 1968 | The Blood of Fu Manchu | Man attacking woman behind grill | Uncredited | |
| 1969 | Two Undercover Angels | Gallery attendant | Uncredited | |
| 1969 | Kiss Me Monster | Abilene sect contact | Uncredited | |
| 1969 | The Girl from Rio | Guitar player | Uncredited | |
| 1969 | 99 Women | 2nd man in bowler hat, officer on boat | Uncredited in two roles | |
| 1969 | Marquis de Sade's Justine | Turbned storyteller in theatre | Uncredited | |
| 1969 | Venus in Furs | Jazz trombonist | Uncredited | |
| 1969 | Eugenie… The Story of Her Journey into Perversion | Cultist | Uncredited | |
| 1969 | The Castle of Fu Manchu | General Hamid, "inspector" | Uncredited | |
| 1970 | Count Dracula | Attendant at the Van Helsing clinic | Uncredited | |
| 1970 | Vampyros Lesbos | Mehmet, hotel porter | | |
| 1970 | She Killed in Ecstasy | Dr. Donen | Uncredited | |
| 1971 | The Devil Came from Akasava | Major Tino Celli | | |
| 1971 | X312 - Flight to Hell | Alfredo | Uncredited | |
| 1972 | La venganza del Doctor Mabuse | Mr. Crosby | | |
| 1972 | Daughter of Dracula | Cyril Jefferson | | |
| 1973 | Sexy Darlings | Film director | Uncredited | |
| 1973 | A Virgin Among the Living Dead | Mr.Basilio | | |
| 1973 | The Erotic Rites of Frankenstein | Morpho | | |
| 1974 | Diary of a Nymphomaniac | Inspector Hernandez | Uncredited | |
| 1974 | The Other Side of the Mirror | Jazz pianist | Uncredited | |
| 1974 | Night of the Skull | Eddy Pimperton | | |
| 1974 | Exorcism | Paul Vogel, alias 'Daniel Matisse', real name Paul Rosa | | |
| 1974 | Celestine, Maid at Your Service | Man awakened by fleeing prostitutes | Uncredited | |
| 1974 | Lorna the Exorcist | Doctor | Uncredited | |
| 1975 | Female Vampire | Dr. Roberts | | |
| 1976 | Julietta 69 | The voyeur | | |
| 1976 | Midnight Party | Janos Radeck, Agent 008 | | |
| 1976 | Shining Sex | Professor Seward | | |
| 1976 | Racket on Pleasure | Mr. Caramélis | | |
| 1976 | Barbed Wire Dolls | Maria's father | Uncredited | |
| 1976 | Downtown | Algino 'Al' Pereira | | |
| 1977 | Women Behind Bars | Bill | | |
| 1977 | Die sklavinnen | Radeck's chief henchman | Uncredited | |
| 1977 | In 80 betten um die welt | Man in black leather jacket watching black mass | | |
| 1977 | Ilsa the Wicked Warden | Dr. Milton Arcos | Uncredited | |
| 1977 | Sexy Sisters | Hands of the piano player | Uncredited | |
| 1977 | Love Camp | Voice of parrot | Uncredited | |
| 1978 | The Sinister Eyes of Dr. Orloff | Eddy Pimperton | | |
| 1981 | The Sadist of Notre Dame | Mathis Laforgue | | |
| 1981 | The Cannibals | Mr. Martin | | |
| 1981 | El sexo está loco | The director | | |
| 1981 | Sadomania | Lucas | | |
| 1981 | Bloody Moon | Dr. Domingo Aundos | | |
| 1982 | Macumba sexual | Mehmet, Hotelier | | |
| 1982 | La noche de los sexos abiertos | Count Miñon | | |
| 1983 | El siniestro Dr. Orloff | Agapito del Pi | | |
| 1996 | La sombra del judoka contra el Dr. Wong | Dr. Wong | | |
| 1983 | Night Has a Thousand Desires | Dr. Harmon | | |
| 1983 | Camino solitario | Dr. Mario Kalman | | |
| 1986 | Sangre en mis zapatos | Second abductor at airport | Uncredited | |
| 1987 | Viaje a Bangkok, atatúd incluido | Bangkok hotel receptionist | Uncredited | |
| 1988 | Countdown to Esmeralda Bay | The Sirena Captain | | |
| 2002 | Dr. Wong's Virtual Hell | Dr. James Wong | | |
| 2002 | Vampire Blues | The Merchant | | |
| —N/a | Los blues de la calle pop | Sam Chesterfield | | |
