= List of Belgian films of the 1970s =

A list of films produced in Belgium ordered by year of release. For an alphabetical list of Belgian films see Category:Belgian films

Title	Director	Cast	Genre	Notes
1970
Solo	Jean-Pierre Mocky	Jean-Pierre Mocky, Sylvie Bréal, Anne Deleuze		French-Belgian co-production
Paix sur les champs (Peace in the Fields)	Jacques Boigelot			Academy Award for Best Foreign Language Film nominee
1971
Daisy Town	René Goscinny		Animation	Belgian-French co-production; based on Lucky Luke comics
Mira	Fons Rademakers			Entered into the 1971 Cannes Film Festival
Malpertuis	Harry Kümel	Orson Welles		Entered into the 1972 Cannes Film Festival
Le rouge aux lèvres (Daughters of Darkness)	Harry Kümel	Delphine Seyrig, Fons Rademakers	Horror	Belgian-French-German co-production
Rendezvous at Bray	André Delvaux	Anna Karina		Entered into the 21st Berlin International Film Festival
1972
The Lonely Killers	Boris Szulzinger			
Tintin et le lac aux requins (Tintin and the Lake of Sharks)	Raymond Leblanc		Animation	
1973
Home Sweet Home	Benoît Lamy	Claude Jade	Comedy	Entered into the 8th Moscow International Film Festival
Belle	André Delvaux			Entered into the 1973 Cannes Film Festival
Far West	Jacques Brel			Entered into the 1973 Cannes Film Festival
Female Vampire	Jesus Franco	Lina Romay, Jack Taylor, Monica Swinn	Horror	French-Belgian co-production
1974
The Conscript	Roland Verhavert			Entered into the 24th Berlin International Film Festival
Screentest For Eurydice	Jean-Noël Gobron	Dominique Binder	Experimental	Official website
The Bear Cage	Marian Handwerker			Entered into the 1974 Cannes Film Festival
Vase de Noces (Wedding Trough)	Thierry Zéno		Horror	
1975
Jeanne Dielman, 23 quai du Commerce, 1080 Bruxelles	Chantal Akerman			
Souvenir of Gibraltar	Henri Xhonneux			Entered into the 9th Moscow International Film Festival
Tarzoon, la honte de la jungle (Tarzoon: Shame of the Jungle)	Picha		Animation	
1976
La flûte à six schtroumpfs (The Smurfs and the Magic Flute)	Eddie Lateste, Peyo		Animation	
High Street	André Ernotte			
1977
Rubens	Roland Verhavert			
1978
One Page of Love	Maurice Rabinowicz			Entered into the 28th Berlin International Film Festival
1979
Woman Between Wolf and Dog	André Delvaux			Entered into the 1979 Cannes Film Festival
Mireille and the Others	Jean-Marie Buchet			Entered into the 11th Moscow International Film Festival
