= List of Spanish films of the 1980s =

Films produced in Spain in the 1980s ordered by year of release on separate pages:

== List of films by year ==
- Spanish films of 1980
- Spanish films of 1981
- Spanish films of 1982
- Spanish films of 1983
- Spanish films of 1984
- Spanish films of 1985
- Spanish films of 1986
- Spanish films of 1987
- Spanish films of 1988
- Spanish films of 1989
