= Philosophy in the Boudoir =

Philosophy in the Boudoir may refer to:

- La Philosophie dans le boudoir or Philosophy in the Bedroom, a 1795 work by the Marquis de Sade
- La Philosophie dans le boudoir, a 1947 painting by René Magritte
