= Death Whistles the Blues =

- Spanish film poster
- Directed by: Jesús Franco
- Screenplay by: Jesús Franco; Luis de Diego
- Story by: Jesús Franco
- Starring: Conrado San Martin; Danik Patisson; Perla Cristal; Georges Rollin; Gearard Tichy
- Cinematography: Juan Mariné
- Music by: Antón Garcia
- Production company: Naga Films
- Release date: 3 June 1964 (Sevilla)
- Country: Spain

Death Whistles the Blues (Spanish: La muerte silba un blues) is a 1964 Spanish film noir film directed by Jesús Franco.

== Production ==
Death Whistles the Blues development dates back to at least May 1961, when director Jesús Franco was working with Sergio Newman. The film was produced the following year by Nazario Belmar, the ex-football player for Real Madrid CF. The film had the pre-production title El desconocido and was shot under the title La muerte silba un blue.

== Release ==
In September 1962, the film received private screenings in Madrid, followed shortly after by one in Spanish for the Parisian press.

The film received lengthy delays for public theatrical release. Madrid Films printed the first 10 prints on June 21, 1963, and posters prepared in October. It was released theatrically first on July 3, 1964, in Sevilla at Cine Florida on July 31, 1964, in Barcelona at Fantasio, and on December 11, 1964, in Bilbao at Consultato and Canciller. Most Spanish distribution took place between 1966 and 1967, where audiences in Madrid would only see the film four years after it was made. Cineinforme magazine did not even report the film, and later apologized to its readers saying that "given the category of the venues, this film passed unnoticed and therefore didn't appear in the corresponding issue."

Franco would remake the film in 1974, for the French-shot film Tango au claire de lune, also known as Kiss Me Killer. Death Whistles the Blues was released on Blu-ray by Severin Films as a double feature with Rififi in the City (1964).

== Reception ==
Film historians Roberto Curti and Francesco Cesari said that generally, Death Sings the Blues was critically regarded as something different and culturally more important than Franco's previous output as a director. In the Spanish film magazine Film Ideal, Juan Cobos stated that Death Sings the Blues was the best Spanish film of 1962. L. Hidalgo of the newspaper Diario de Mallorca praised the director, the score and the cinematography. Cineinforme declared the film a "bad Spanish concoction of mystery and vengeance, made without artistic ambitions and with an obvious lack of means."

== See also ==
- List of Spanish films of 1964
