= Alice Arno =

French actress and model (born 1946)

Alice Arno (born June 29, 1946) is a French actress, nudist and model, best known for her roles in European sexploitation and horror film genres.

== Movie career ==
Arno (who was raised in a family of nudists) worked as a nude model (posing for Pop, Men, Topfilm...) when she began her film career in 1969 at the age of 22. In 1972, she played the lead role in Justine de Sade, Claude Pierson's film adaptation of the Marquis de Sade's 1791 novel Justine. Along with Lina Romay and Monica Swinn, she became one of the most popular figures of European exploitation film. She worked for Eurociné and for Robert de Nesle's Comptoir Français de Productions Cinématographiques. She appeared in twelve erotic horror movies directed by Jesús Franco and is best remembered for playing the titular role in Franco's The Perverse Countess (1974), an erotic remake of the classic 1932 film The Most Dangerous Game.

She appeared in ten films with her sister Chantal Broquet, who also worked as a model and actress in low-budget European film productions. Chantal only appeared in three Franco films, The Obscene Mirror and his two Maciste films. They both quit the film industry after the advent of hardcore pornography. Alice Arno stopped making films in 1977, at age 31. (Chantal retired from films in 1975.)

== Filmography of Alice Arno ==
- 1967 : Les Poneyttes directed by Joël Le Moigné
- 1968 : Nathalie, l'amour s'éveille directed by Pierre Chevalier
- 1970 : The Sicilian Clan directed by Henri Verneuil ... a model
- 1970 : L'amour, oui! Mais... directed by Philippe Schneider and Joël Lifschutz
- 1970 : Eugenie de Sade (a.k.a. Eugenie Sex Happening) directed by Jess Franco, released in 1973
- 1971 : Señora casada necesita joven bien dotado directed by Juan Xiol
- 1971 : Atout sexe directed by Max Kalifa
- 1971 : La Débauche directed by Jean-François Davy
- 1971 : L'argent et l'amour directed by Jean Lévitte
- 1971 : Le Casse directed by Henri Verneuil
- 1972 : Lâchez les chiennes directed by Bernard Launois
- 1972 : Justine de Sade directed by Claude Pierson
- 1972 : L'insatisfaite directed by Jean-Marie Pallardy
- 1973 : Les aventures galantes de Zorro directed by Gilbert Roussel
- 1973 : Tendre et perverse Emanuelle / Tender and Perverse Emanuelle directed by Jess Franco
- 1973 : Maciste contre la reine des Amazones (a.k.a. Lustful Amazons / Maciste vs the Amazon Queen) directed by Jess Franco
- 1973 : Les gloutonnes (The Erotic Adventures of Maciste in Atlantis) directed by Jess Franco
- 1973 : Le Miroir cochon (a.k.a. The Other Side of the Mirror) - this was the adult x-rated version of Jess Franco's The Other Side of the Mirror
- 1973 : Pigalle carrefour des illusions directed by Pierre Chevalier
- 1973 : The Bare-Breasted Countess (a.k.a. Female Vampire, a.k.a. Erotikill) directed by Jess Franco
- 1973 : Avortement clandestin ! directed by Pierre Chevalier
- 1973 : Les Infidèles directed by Christian Lara ... the maid
- 1973 : Oh, If Only My Monk Would Want (Ah! Si mon moine voulait...) directed by Claude Pierson
- 1973 : Les Gourmandines directed by Guy Pérol
- 1973 : A Virgin Among the Living Dead (Arno appeared in an erotic insert that was later added to this 1971 film when it was released as Christina, Princess of Eroticism in France in 1973); director Jess Franco did not direct or approve of the added scenes
- 1973 : Plaisir à trois / Pleasure for Three (a.k.a. How to Seduce a Virgin) directed by Jess Franco ... Martine Bressac
- 1973 : Les Nuits brûlantes de Linda / Linda's Hot Nights (a.k.a. Who Raped Linda?) directed by Jess Franco : credited as Marie-France Bertrand
- 1973 : La comtesse perverse (a.k.a. The Perverse Countess) directed by Jess Franco ...Countess Ivanna Zaroff
- 1974 : Règlements de femmes à O.Q. Corral directed by Jean-Marie Pallardy
- 1974 : Convoy of Women directed by Pierre Chevalier
- 1974 : Chicas de alquiler directed by Ignacio F. Iquino
- 1974 : Kiss Me Killer (a.k.a. Sexy Blues) directed by Jess Franco
- 1975 : Des Filles dans une Cage Doree (a.k.a. Women in a Golden Cage) directed by Jess Franco and Marius Lesoeur
- 1975 : L'Arrière-train sifflera trois fois directed by Jean-Marie Pallardy ... Calamity Jane / Gilda
- 1975 : La Pipe au bois directed by Maxime Debest ... Margot
- 1975 : Il Torcinaso directed by Giancarlo Romitelli
- 1975 : Les Orgies du Golden Saloon directed by Gilbert Roussel : Heplabelle
- 1975 : Hard Core Story directed by Guy Maria : Mireille
- 1975 : Les Karatéchattes directed by Guy Maria : Michèle
- 1976 : Chaleur et jouissance (the hardcore adult version of Double Face) directed by Riccardo Freda
- 1976 : Paris Porno directed by Jacques Orth
- 1976 : Et si tu n'en veux pas directed by Jacques Besnard
- 1977 : Bouches gourmandes directed by André Koob... GretaYoung

== Filmography of Chantal Broquet ==
- 1968 : Nathalie, l'amour s'éveille directed by Pierre Chevalier
- 1969 : La Punition (ou Trafic de filles) directed by Jean Maley
- 1971 : Señora casada necesita joven bien dotado directed by Juan Xiol
- 1972 : Lâchez les chiennes directed by Bernard Launois
- 1972 : Justine de Sade directed by Claude Pierson
- 1973 : Maciste contre la reine des Amazones (Maciste vs the Amazon Queen) a.k.a. The Lustful Amazons, directed by Jess Franco
- 1973 : Les gloutonnes; a.k.a. Les exploits érotiques de Maciste dans l'Atlantide / The Erotic Exploits of Maciste in Atlantis; directed by Jess Franco
- 1973 : Le Miroir cochon (The Obscene Mirror) - this was the adult x-rated version of Jesus Franco's The Other Side of the Mirror
- 1973 : Pigalle carrefour des illusions directed by Pierre Chevalier
- 1973 : Les gourmandines directed by Guy Pérol
- 1974 : Hommes de joie pour femmes vicieuses directed by Pierre Chevalier
- 1975 : La dévoreuse directed by André Teisseire
- 1975 : Les orgies du Golden Saloon directed by Gilbert Roussel
