= Elektrotwist =

- Origin: Germany
- Genres: Electronica; Nu jazz
- Years active: 1992–2003
- Labels: Eleganz Records
- Members: Jörg Meyerink; Uwe Moellhusen

Elektrotwist is an electronic band from Germany. Their music is based on sounds and samples from the period of 1957–1962 exclusively thus achieving a particular retro-dance feel.

== History ==
The band has been a duo composed of Uwe Moellhusen, an artist who does multimedia as well as conceptualizes and organizes exhibitions, and Joerg Meyerink a computer programmer, and 3-D animator. Both are sound archivists and electronic strategists. What sets them apart is that they collect sounds from the period of 1957–1962 exclusively and create sound collages that evoke everything hep from the era.

In their own words: "We collect information on the years fifty to early sixties, sound material, photographs, movies, architecture, design, and technology to dive into this era and to resurface with cornerstones for an alternate, parallel universe. it is basically not the melodies we're interested in, but more in the sounds' structures and yesterday's recording techniques which allow us to emerge the latent modernism from the historical underground, recombining it."

Joerg Meyerink has died in 2015, whilst Uwe Moellhusen, now living in Berlin, continues his work in art and music.

== Reception ==
They generally receive high critical acclaim, with others noting their individual style: "...Retro-kitsch soundtrackism....Suave as [heck]. Their love of pre-Beatles hipster culture comes vividly to finger-snapping life."

== Discography ==
=== Albums ===
- 1999 La Philosophie Dans Le Boudoir

=== Singles/EPs ===
- 1998 "Raketenjazz"
- 1999 "The Invisible Striptease"
- 2000 "Zero-Trick"
