= Roger Cotte =

French musicologist and musician (1921–1999)

Roger Cotte (1921 in Clamart – 1999) was a 20th-century French recorder player and musicologist.

== Career ==
Cotte studied music at the Conservatoire de Paris with Gaston Crunelle from 1940 to 1948. He created and directed since 1953 the Group of Ancient Instruments of Paris. In 1961, he obtained a Ph.D. in musicology from the Sorbonne, where he directed the musicology laboratory. He taught flute at the Schola Cantorum de Paris. He composed some music for films, including Oh, If Only My Monk Would Want (Ah! Si mon moine voulait...) and Justine de Sade by Claude Pierson. From 1984 to 1992, he taught at the State University of Sao Paulo, Brazil, where he founded an early music group. He published La musique maçonnique et ses musiciens, Musique et symbolisme and a notebook of masonic songs.

His musical research has focused on Jean-Jacques Rousseau and Masonic music in Mozart, Beethoven, Johann Nepomuk Hummel.

== Publications ==
- 1958: Méthode complète de flûte à bec (ou flûte douce), Paris
- 1959: Encyclopédie des grands compositeurs, Paris
- 1961: Compositeurs français émigrés en Suède, thèse de doctorat, Paris
- 1973: Précis d'organologie, in: L'éducation musicale
- 1974: La musique maçonnique et ses musiciens, Paris
- Les textes de Voltaire mis en musique
- 1976: Jean-Jacques Rousseau musicien on the site of the BNF
