= Crunelle =

Crunelle is a surname. Notable people with the surname include:

- Gaston Crunelle (1898–1990), French classical flautist and teacher
- Leonard Crunelle (1872–1944), French-born American sculptor
