= List of Spanish films of 1964 =

A list of films produced in Spain in 1964 (see 1964 in film).

== 1964 ==
Title	Director	Cast	Genre	Notes
The Betrothed	Mario Maffei	Gil Vidal, Maria Silva	Historical	Co-production with Italy
Death Whistles the Blues	Jesús Franco	Conrado San Martin, Danik Patisson, Perla Cristal	Film noir	
El extraño viaje	Fernando Fernán Gómez	Carlos Larrañaga, Rafaela Aparicio, Jesús Franco	Black comedy	
La Tía Tula	Miguel Picazo	Aurora Bautista, Carlos Estrada	Drama	Based on famous Miguel de Unamuno's novel
Franco, ese hombre	José Luis Sáenz de Heredia		Documentary	Propaganda documentary about Francisco Franco after the 25th anniversary of the end of the Spanish Civil War
The Girl in Mourning	Manuel Summers			Entered into the 1964 Cannes Film Festival
Terror in the Crypt	Camillo Mastrocinque	Christopher Lee, Adriana Ambesi, Pier Anna Quaglia	Horror	Italian-Spanish co-production
Three for a Robbery	Gianni Bongioanni	Christian Doermer, Werner Peters, Barbara Steele	Crime	Co-production with Italy and West Germany
Weeping for a Bandit	Carlos Saura	Francisco Rabal, Lea Massari, Lino Ventura, Luis Buñuel		Entered into the 14th Berlin International Film Festival

== Notes ==
=== References ===
- Cesari, Francesco; Curti, Roberto (2024). The Films of Jesus Franco, 1953-1966. McFarland & Company. ISBN 978-1-4766-9431-3.
- Curti, Roberto (2015). Italian Gothic Horror Films, 1957-1969. McFarland. ISBN 978-1476619897.
