= Rififi in the City =

- Spanish: Rififi en la ciudad
- Directed by: Jesús Franco
- Screenplay by: Jesús Franco; Gonzalo Sebastian de Erice; Juan Cobos
- Based on: Vous souvenez vous de Paco? by Charles Exbrayat
- Produced by: José López Brea
- Starring: Fernando Fernán Gómez; Jean Servais; Laura Granados; Antonio Prieto
- Cinematography: Godofredo Pacheco
- Edited by: Ángel Serrano
- Music by: Daniel J. White
- Production company: Cooperativa Cinematográfica Albatros
- Distributed by: Cifesa
- Release dates: 22 April 1964 (France); 7 December 1964 (Madrid)
- Country: Spain
- Language: Spanish

Rififi in the City (Spanish: Rififi en la ciudad) is a 1964 Spanish film directed and co-written by Jesús Franco, and starring Fernando Fernán Gómez, Jean Servais, Laura Granados and Antonio Prieto. It is based on the novel Vous souvenez vous de Paco? (transl. Do You Remember Paco?) by author Charles Exbrayat.

Initially set as a Spanish and French co-production, changes in distribution agreements led to the film only being produced by Cooperativa Cinematográfica Albatros. Filming was initially set to begin on February 13, 1963, but was delayed for two months.

While the film received a positive review in the Spanish newspaper Arriba, it was dismissed in the Spanish film magazine Film Ideal. The film has since received some positive reception from Spanish publications, including being included in an anthology of Spanish film in 1997.

== Plot ==
In an unnamed Latin American country, police informant Juan Solano is murdered by men working for Maurice Leprince, a wealthy politician running for high office, who is involved in drug trafficking. Juan was on the verge of obtaining the incriminating evidence to arrest Leprince. From that moment on, all those involved in Juan's death are eliminated one by one. Among the suspects is Miguel Mora, Juan's police handler.

== Cast ==
- Fernando Fernán Gómez as Det. Miguel Mora
- Jean Servais as Maurice Leprince
- Laura Granados as Pilar
- Antonio Prieto as Inspector Vargas
- Robert Manuel as Puig
- Maria Vincent as Nina Laverne
- Dina Loy as Juanita
- Agustín González as Antonio Ribera
- Serafín García Vázquez as Juan Solano
- Manuel Gas as Miralles
- Luis Marín as Manolo
- Ángel Menéndez as Jimmy
- Frank Braña as Mario Alonso
- Jacinto San Emeterio as Leprince's Lawyer
- Joaquín Pamplona as Vargas' Aide
- Davidson Hepburn as Chico Torres
- Greta Marcos as Fulana

== Production ==
Following The Sadistic Baron von Klaus (1963), director Jesús Franco's next project was Rififi in the City. The film is based on the novel Vous souvenez vous de Paco? (transl. Do You Remember Paco?) by French novelist Charles Exbrayat. The novel was popular, winning the Prix du roman d'aventures in 1958. The rights to the novel were purchased for 600,000 pesetas, twice the cost of the fee for the director and more than the sum paid to the male leads in the film.

The film was initially set to be a co-production in the early planning stages in December 1962. Initially, four companies were set to be involved: the Madrid-based Cooperativa Albatros and Jeme Films, and the Paris-based Compagnie des Artisans du Film, and Eurociné. Among the cast were Jean Servais and Robert Manuel who had previously appeared in the film Rififi (1955), hence the Spanish title referring to the 1955 film.

Rififi in the City would mark the beginning and end of collaborative partners with Franco. It was the first film Franco made with Trino Martinez Trives, who initially worked as a stage director and later acted in Franco's films from the 1980s. It was the second and last film he would work with screenwriters and critics from Film Ideal, screenwriters Juan Cobos and Gonzalo Sebastian de Erice. It was the third and final collaboration between cinematographer Godofredo Pacheco with Franco, after working with him on The Awful Dr. Orloff (1962) and The Sadistic Baron von Klaus.

Filming was initially set to begin on February 13, 1963, but was delayed for two months. The score by Daniel White was recorded in April 1963.

== Release ==
The distribution of the film proved to be problematic. On April 15, 1963, Albatros and Compagnie des Artistsans du Film signed a second deal without the knowledge of Eurociné. Eurociné backed out of funding, leading the film to be passed back and forth between distribution companies in France before being distributed in France by a company called C.I.I. Ángel Escolano said this distribution problem caused difficulties for Cooperativa Cinematográfica Albatros, as the film had cost more than initially expected. Franco alternative said that Eurociné had dropped out as left the project after realizing the film was casting more expensive actors.

The film was distributed in southern parts of France starting on April 22, 1964, under the title Vous souvenez-vous de Paco? and later re-released as Chasse à la Mafia. It was released in Madrid on December 7, 1964, in three theatres: Fantasio, Figaro and Rialto. These were followed by screenings on August 11, 1965, in Oviedo and February 28, 1966, in Sevilla. Outside Spain and France, the film was shown in Montreal, Canada on August 16, 1965, where it screened with Jean Luc Godard's Contempt (1963).

The film was sold to distributors in the United States, but no English-language version of the film is known. It was released with the English title Rififi in the City on home video.

== Reception ==
From contemporary reviews, The Spanish newspaper Arriba described the film as a skillful technical production, with "many moments of genuine cinema" Alternatively, Ramon Gomez Redondo from Film Ideal stated the film found the film "boring, ridiculous, perfectly confusing."

In 1991, Spanish critic Carlos Aguilar stated that the film "triumphs, totally, where just one year earlier La muerte silba un blues has failed, partially." Andrés Peláez Paz praised the film, and included it in a 1997 anthology Antología crítica del cine español 1906-1995 of Spanish cinema alongside the most famous Iberian masterpieces. Andrés Peláez Paz declared the film to be a love letter to the cinema of Orson Welles in the book.
