= List of Spanish films of 1983 =

A list of Spanish-produced and co-produced feature films released in Spain in 1983.

== Films ==
Date		Title	Cast & crew	Ref.
A P R I L	14	Bearn o la sala de las muñecas	Director: Jaime Chávarri Cast: Fernando Rey, Ángela Molina, Amparo Soler Leal, Imanol Arias	
M A Y	6	Carmen	Director: Carlos Saura Cast: Antonio Gades, Laura del Sol, Paco de Lucía, Cristina Hoyos, Pepa Flores	
M A Y	11	Night Has a Thousand Desires (Mil sexos tiene la noche)	Director: Jesús Franco Cast: Lina Romay	
M A Y	19	El Sur	Director: Víctor Erice Cast: Omero Antonutti, Sonsoles Aranguren, Iciar Bollain	
M A Y	20	Panic Beats (Latidos de pánico)	Director: Jacinto Molina Cast: Paul Naschy, Julia Saly, Lola Gaos, Silvia Miró, Manolo Zarzo, José Vivó, Pat Ondiviela	
A U G U S T	1	Hundra	Director: Matt Cimber Cast: Laurene Landon	
A U G U S T	4	The Autonomines (Las autonosuyas)	Director: Rafael Gil Cast: Alfredo Landa, María Casanova, Manolo Codeso, Fernando Sancho, Ángel de Andrés, José Bódalo	
N O V E M B E R	24	The Beast and the Magic Sword (La bestia y la espada mágica)	Director: Jacinto Molina Cast: Paul Naschy, Sara Mora, Conrado San Martín, Shigeru Amachi	
O C T O B E R	3	El arreglo	Director: José Antonio Zorrilla, Cast: Eusebio Poncela, Isabel Mestres, Pedro Díez del Corral, Pilar Alcón, José Luis Barceló	
O C T O B E R	4	El pico	Director: Eloy de la Iglesia Cast: José Luis Manzano, José Manuel Cervino, Enrique San Francisco, Luis Iriondo, Marta Molins, Ovidi Montllor	
O C T O B E R	7	Entre tinieblas (Dark Habits)	Director: Pedro Almodóvar Cast: Cristina S. Pascual, Julieta Serrano, Marisa Paredes, Carmen Maura, Mari Carrillo, Lina Canalejas, Manuel Zarzo, Berta Riaza	
