= Oh, If Only My Monk Would Want =

1973 Canadian-French comedy film

- French: Ah ! Si mon moine voulait...
- Directed by: Claude Pierson
- Written by: Huguette Boisvert
- Based on: Heptaméron by Marguerite de Navarre
- Produced by: John Dunning; Nicole M. Boisvert; Claude Pierson
- Starring: Jean-Marie Proslier; Gilles Latulippe
- Cinematography: Jean-Jacques Tarbès
- Edited by: François Ceppi
- Music by: Roger Cotte; Françoise Cotte
- Production companies: Cinépix; Pierson Productions
- Distributed by: Cinépix
- Release date: August 17, 1973
- Running time: 93 minutes
- Country: Canada
- Language: French

Oh, If Only My Monk Would Want (French: Ah ! Si mon moine voulait..., also known as L'Heptaméron, Vertudieu! or Joyeux compères) is a Canadian-French sex comedy film, directed by Claude Pierson and released in 1973.

An anti-clerical film adapted in part from Marguerite de Navarre's 16th-century short story collection Heptaméron, the film stars Jean-Marie Proslier and Gilles Latulippe as two Roman Catholic monks who move to a small town in 18th century New France, ostensibly to live a simple religious life but really with the ulterior motive of seducing and having sex with the town's attractive and lascivious women away from the eyes of the church hierarchy.

The cast includes Catherine Rouvel, Marco Perrin, Alice Arno, Marcel Sabourin, Louise Turcot, Roger Carel, Chantal de Rieux, Paul Préboist, Darry Cowl, Michel Galabru, Monique Tarbès, Roseline Hoffman, Sylvie Joly, Rachel Cailhier, Mag-Avril, Sophie Bacquet, Danièle Paradis, Rosine Young and Guy Hoffmann.

== Production and distribution ==
The film is told as a series of comic sketches, each featuring a different set of supporting characters and each based on one of the stories in the Heptaméron. Its original French title was derived from "Ah! Si mon moine voulait danser", a traditional French folk song.

It was noted as the first leading film role for Latulippe, who would go on to become one of Quebec's most celebrated film and television actors over the course of his career.

The film premiered theatrically in Quebec in August 1973.

== Critical response ==
The film was poorly received by critics, with both Luc Perreault of La Presse and Léo Bonneville of Séquences savaging it in Quebec's French-language media. Bonneville wrote that the fact that the film was shot in Quebec with actors from both Quebec and France in its cast was the only thing it had to recommend it, while Perreault called it a boring film that was a discredit to everybody involved.

Jack Kapica of the Montreal Gazette was more charitable, calling it an inconsequential but fun romp that was essentially a Quebec version of the British Carry On film franchise.
