= Monica Swinn =

Belgian actress

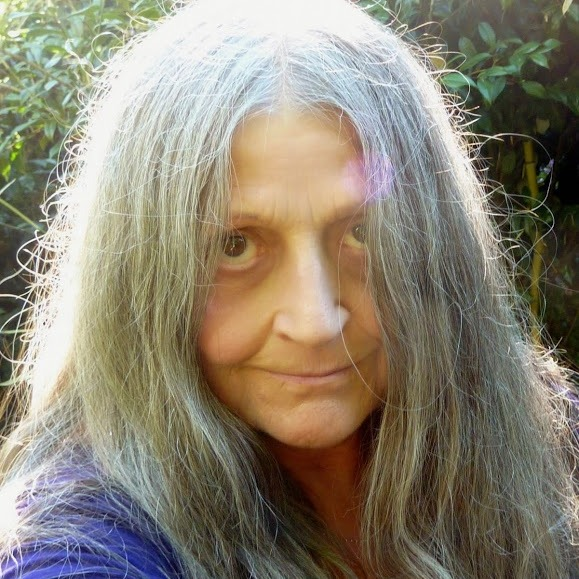
- Swinn in 2013
- Born: Monika Swuine; 19 September 1948 (age 77); Charleroi, Belgium
- Occupation: Actress
- Years active: 1980–present

Monica Swinn (born Monika Swuine; 19 September 1948) is a Belgian actress, best known for her roles in European softcore erotic films of the 1970s, particularly those of the sexploitation and horror film genres. She acted in 20 of Jesús Franco's films, which occasionally featured her in hardcore lesbian scenes with Lina Romay and another Franco regular, Alice Arno; different versions of films such as Female Vampire (1973) had to be produced because of their explicit scenes.

She tended to play characters with a sexual vulnerability, usually maids, prisoners or isolated aristocratic women, although two of her lead roles were as a sadistic wardress in Franco's women in prison film Barbed Wire Dolls (1976) and as a nightclub singer and Madam for the SS in Alain Payet's Nazisploitation film, Hitler's Last Train (1977). According to Swinn herself she was typecast, recalling after reading a typical Franco script: "I'd mull over the previous scenes and think to myself, "This can't be the same character. How many films am I really making here?".

== Filmography ==
- Overdrive (1970)
- Bande de cons! – Noose (uncredited) (1970)
- Le sexe enragé (short) – Monelle (1970)
- La tzira (short) – Cannibal girl (1970)
- The Lover (1972)
- The Perverse Countess – Prisoner (1973)
- Al otro lado del espejo (The Other Side of the Mirror) – Marie's Girlfriend (1973)
- Female Vampire (The Bare Breasted Countess) – Princess de Rochefort (1973, released 1975)
- Les nuits brûlantes de Linda (Linda's Hot Nights) (1973)
- Exorcisme (1974) directed by Jess Franco
- La fête des fous (1974)
- Hommes de joie pour femmes vicieuses – Alba Ory (1974)
- Prout prout tralala (short) – Narrator (voice) (uncredited) (1974)
- Célestine, bonne à tout faire/ Celestine, Maid at your Service (1974)
- The Demoniacs (Curse of the Living Dead) – Girl in tavern (1974)
- Les chatouilleuses (Nuns in Madness) (1974) – Simone
- Le jouisseur, aka Roland, the Sexiest Man in the World – Mrs. Lapierre (1974)
- Les emmerdeuses, aka Sexy-a-Go-Go – Pindar (1974)
- Julietta '69, aka Justine and the Whip (1975)
- Shining Sex – Madame Pécame (1975)
- Midnight Party – Linda (1975)
- Une cage dorée, aka Women in a Gold Cage (1975) – Barmaid
- Barbed Wire Dolls (1975) – The Wardress (1975)
- Draguse ou le manoir infernal – Draguse (1975)
- Downtown – Die nackten Puppen der Unterwelt – Olga Ramos (1975)
- La marque de Zorro – Miss Hayes (1975)
- Les baiseuses – Fabienne Meunier – directrice de la maison de correction (1975)
- Lorna Steiner (1975)
- Die Marquise von Sade (Doriana Gray) (1976) – journalist
- Paris porno (1976)
- Hitler's Last Train (Helltrain) – Ingrid Schüler (1977)
- Ces sacrées anglaises (1977)
- Cinéma 16 (TV series), episode:Au bout du printemps (1977)
- Frauen im Liebeslager (Love Camp) – Maria (1977)
- Once Upon a Virgin (1977)
- East of Berlin, aka Convoy of Women– Greta (1978)
- Wicked Women, aka Frauen ohne Unschuld – Sandra Mauro (1978)
- L'éventreur de Notre-Dame (The Sadist of Notre Dame) – Maria, a sadist (1979)
- Le sexe enragé de la fée sanguinaire – Monelle (1979)
- Les petites sauvages (1982)
- The Duke of Burgundy (2014)
