= Rolls-Royce Baby =

1975 film

- Directed by: Erwin C. Dietrich
- Written by: Erwin C. Dietrich
- Screenplay by: Erwin C. Dietrich
- Produced by: Erwin C. Dietrich
- Starring: Lina Romay; Eric Falk
- Cinematography: Andreas Demmer
- Music by: Walter Baumgartner
- Production company: Ascot Elite Home Entertainment
- Release date: December 1975 (Germany)
- Running time: 84 min
- Country: Switzerland
- Language: German

Rolls-Royce Baby is a 1975 Swiss sexploitation film written and directed by Erwin C. Dietrich under the pseudonym Michael Thomas. Dietrich claimed years later in interviews that his frequent collaborator Jesus Franco co-directed this film, and “loaned” his leading lady to Dietrich.

== Plot ==
Lina Romay stars as Lisa, a nymphomaniac actress and model who travels the countryside in a Rolls-Royce seeking to pick up hitchhikers and truck drivers for sex. Her driver Erik acts as her chauffeur on these nocturnal expeditions. The film contains graphic nudity, including a scene in which Romay shaves her pubic area in close-up, and participates in oral sex onscreen.

== Cast ==
- Lina Romay as Lisa
- Eric Falk as Eric
- Ursula Schäfer as Pick-up Girl
- Kurt Meinicke as Photographer
- Roman Hüber as Truck Driver
- Marcel Imbach
- Jonas Ohlin
- Lothar Blumhagen (voice only)
- Alexander Blazzoni
