= Eugénie de Sade =

1973 film

Eugenie de Sade
- Directed by: Jesús Franco
- Written by: Jesús Franco
- Based on: "Eugénie de Franval" by Marquis de Sade
- Produced by: Marius Lesoeur; Karl Heinz Mannchen
- Starring: Soledad Miranda
- Cinematography: Manuel Merino
- Edited by: Clarissa Ambach
- Music by: Bruno Nicolai
- Release date: 1973
- Running time: 86 minutes
- Country: Liechtenstein

Eugenie de Sade (original titles: Eugénie and Eugenie Sex Happening) is a softcore film adaptation and modern-day update of the Marquis de Sade's short story "Eugénie de Franval" (1800) directed by Spanish filmmaker Jesús Franco in 1970 and released in 1973. It has often been confused with his earlier Eugenie… The Story of Her Journey into Perversion (1970), an adaptation of de Sade's book Philosophy in the Bedroom (1795), as both films are often referred to simply as Eugenie.

== Cast ==
- Soledad Miranda as Eugénie Radeck de Franval
- Paul Muller as Albert Radeck de Franval
- Andrea Montchal as Paul
- Greta Schmidt as Kitty
- Alice Arno as photo model

== See also ==
- Marquis de Sade in popular culture
