= Jean-Claude Gérard =

French flautist

Jean-Claude Gérard is a French flautist born in Angers. He studied with Gaston Crunelle and Marcel Moyse at the Conservatoire National Supérieur de Musique in Paris.

He won several international competitions and began his career in Paris, playing with the Orchestre des Concerts Lamoureux and at the Opéra National de Paris. He moved to Germany in 1972. After his engagement as a solo flutist with the Philharmonic State Orchestra in Hamburg, he was a professor at the Hochschule für Musik und Theater Hannover from 1986 to 1989. Since 1989 he has been professor at the University of Music and Performing Arts in Stuttgart. Apart from his pedagogic commitments, numerous concerts, recordings, Jean-Claude Gérard is a member of the Deutsche Bläsersolisten, the Ensemble Villa Musica and the Bach-Collegium Stuttgart under the direction of Helmuth Rilling.
