= Espionage in Lisbon =

- Spanish film poster
- Directed by: Federico Aicardi; Tulio Demicheli
- Story by: Jesús Franco
- Produced by: Federico Aicardi; Tulio Demicheli
- Starring: Brett Halsey; Marilù Tolo; Fernando Rey; Jeanne Valérie; Alfredo Mayo
- Cinematography: Angelo Lotti
- Edited by: Magdalena Pulido
- Music by: Jesús Franco; Daniel White
- Production companies: Hesperia Films; Spéva Films; Terra-Filmkunst
- Distributed by: Les Films Marbeuf (France); Indipendenti Regionali (Italy)
- Release dates: October 1965 (Spain); 28 October 1966 (France)
- Countries: Spain; France; Italy

Espionage in Lisbon (Spanish: Misión Lisboa, French: 077 intrigue à Lisbonne, Italian: Da 077: Intrigo a Lisbona) is a 1965 spy film directed by Federico Aicardi and Tulio Demicheli. It starred Brett Halsey, Marilù Tolo, Fernando Rey, Jeanne Valérie, and Alfredo Mayo.

Spanish director Jesús Franco was announced as developing a film titled Sangre en mis zapatos. The film would later move on to director Tulio Demicheli. It was shot between April and May 1965. The film's story was credited to Franco, who would later re-create scenes of the film in the 1980s in a film titled Sangre en mis zapatos.

== Cast ==
- Brett Halsey as George Farrell, agent 077
- Marilù Tolo as Terry Brown, 077's partner
- Fernando Rey as Agent of the New World Organization
- Jeanne Valérie as Olga
- Alfredo Mayo as Losky
- Daniel Ceccaldi as Robert Scott
- Francesca Rosano
- Irán Eory as Moira
- Barbara Nelli as Pamela
- Erika Blanc as girl in bikini (as Erica Bianchi)
- Ángel Terrón
- Rafael Bardem

== Production ==
After finishing Death Whistles the Blues (1964) which was filmed in 1962, director Jesús Franco worked on several projects, including one first announced in September 1962 as Sangre en mis zapatos transl. Blood on My Shoes. A notice of Sangre en mis zapatos announced again as a Spanish-French co-production in an issue of Cine en 7 días on May 30, 1964.

Franco left directing the project, to work for Orson Welles on Chimes at Midnight (1966), leaving the film still titled Sangre en mis zapatos to now be directed by Tulio Demicheli by the end of October 1964. The script is officially credited to José Luis Bayonas and Juan Cobos while the technical script is credited to Demicheli Monica Felt (aka known as Monica Venturini).

Prints of the film do not cite Franco as the screenwriting, but he shares a credit for the score along with Danile White. The script retained at the Biblioteca Nactional de Espanana credits the story to David Khunne. David Khunne was one of Franco's many aliases he would use to credit the author of a story, and occasionally for music.

The film was shot between April and May 1965. It was a co-production among Spain, Italy and France.

== Release ==
The film was released in October 1965 as Misión Lisboa. It was released in France on October 28, 1966 as 077 intrigue Lisbonne. It was released in Italy as Da 077: Intrigo a Lisbona. It is an unofficial entry in the Secret Agent 077 film series.

It was released to television in the United States as Espionage in Lisbon in 1971. Several sequences are faithfully reprised in the film Sangre en mis zapatos, a remake shot by Franco in 1983.

== Reception ==
TV Guide calls the film a "Simple spy show". An Italian contemporary review finds the plot murky and the situations in the film conventional but admits it contains a few interesting points.

== See also ==
- Jesús Franco filmography
