= Female Vampire =

1975 film

- DVD cover
- Directed by: Jesús Franco
- Screenplay by: Jesús Franco
- Produced by: Marius Lesoeur
- Starring: Lina Romay; Jack Taylor; Alice Arno; Monica Swinn; Jean-Pierre Bouyxou
- Cinematography: Jesús Franco
- Edited by: Jesús Franco; Ramon Ardid
- Music by: Daniel White
- Production companies: Brux International Pictures; Les Films Marc
- Release date: May 7, 1975 (France)
- Countries: Belgium; France

Female Vampire (a.k.a. The Bare-Breasted Countess) is a horror film written, directed, and co-edited by Jesús Franco. It was produced in 1973, but was only theatrically distributed in 1975. The film is set in Madeira and stars actress Lina Romay as Irina von Karlstein, a vampire who has sex with both male and female victims. In an unusual variation of the vampire myth, Karlstein performs oral sex on her victims until they die, draining them of their sexual fluids.

Three versions of the film were shot: straight horror, horror mixed with sex, and a hardcore pornography version. Franco's original title for the film was The Bare Breasted Countess, but it was released under many different titles over the years. To assuage Franco, the film was screened as The Bare Breasted Countess at the 2009 Fantastic Fest in the United States, which Franco attended as guest of honor. The film's title was inexplicably changed to Female Vampire for its DVD release.

== Plot ==
The plot revolves around Countess Irina von Karlstein (Lina Romay), a mute woman who needs sex like a vampire needs blood in order to stay alive. Without speaking, the Countess is able to hypnotize victims and lure them into transfixed erotic acts. In addition, she is able to fly from the scene quickly due to her bat-changing abilities. When new victims are found fatally drained of potency, and left scattered around the town, forensic scientist Dr. Roberts consults his colleague, Dr. Orloff, who confirms that a vampire is responsible. A female journalist and few others meet the countess and confront her about her ties to vampires in her family. While the Countess tells the truth and admits that she is a vampire, few remain living to report the truth and warn other townspeople. The countess is also confronted by a psychic investigator who believes he is destined to become her lover and join her among the immortals.

== Production ==
In director Jesús Franco's productions from 1972 and onward, his films became more inclined towards themes involving female sex and zoom in shots on female genitalia. After the death of Franco's previous preferred lead actress Soledad Miranda, he cast 19-year-old actress Lina Romay as the Countess Irina. Romay was more open about her sexuality than Miranda, which allowed Franco to focus on his more sex-based themes in his films. Franco originally made three different versions of the film.... a straight vampire film called La comtesse noire (The Black Countess), a horror-oriented erotic film entitled La Comtesse aux seins nus (The Bare Breasted Countess), and the hardcore pornography version Les avaleuses (The Swallowers). These 3 versions ran at 72 minutes, 82 minutes, and 96 minutes respectively.

Franco felt that The Bare Breasted Countess was an erotica film as opposed to a pornographic film. Franco compared the use of sex in his films to the film In the Realm of the Senses by Japanese director Nagisa Oshima whose film contained sex with social and political commentary. Franco compared his film to Oshima's, stating "there are lots of hardcore shots but nobody would say 'Oh, it's a porno film!' No. It's a very important story. I felt in [Female Vampire] I did the same thing. There was a need to show it, like you must show how Dracula sucks his blood, you need to show how this Countess sucks the semen." Some scenes with the vampires were filmed twice....in the manner of a traditional vampire film and also in a much more graphic style.

The film was edited by Franco and Ramon Ardid (Lina Romay's then-husband) under the combined pseudonym Pierre Querut.

== Release ==
The film premiered in France under the title La Comtesse noire on 7 May 1975. The producers added hardcore pornography scenes to the film on some of its releases. The film has been released under several alternative English titles, including Yacula, Jacula, Bare-Breasted Vampire, The Bare Breasted Countess and Naked Vampire. The film was screened as The Bare Breasted Countess (Franco's preferred title) at the 2009 Fantastic Fest with Lina Romay and Franco in attendance.

Female Vampire was released by Image Entertainment on DVD on 8 August 2000. The film was re-released on DVD and blu-ray disc by Kino International. The Kino release includes both a 71-minute "horror version" and a 101-minute "erotic version".

== Reception ==
From a contemporary review, David McGillivray (Monthly Film Bulletin), reviewing a 59-minute dubbed version of the film, stated the cuts have made a narratively complex film even more confusing, describing the film as "a fragment of a much longer film, although in this case the cuts have added a bizarre new level to a work already wrapped in mystery" The reviewer commented that "what exactly is going on, and what exactly Irina is doing to her victims, remains a mind-boggling conundrum", noting that "with the exception of the first encounter, she appears not to be doing anything at all."

From retrospective reviews, Kim Newman referred to the film as "One of Franco's better films" as well noting that for Franco's fanbase it is "a masterpiece; to everyone else, wearisome tat." The online film database Allmovie gave the film one and a half stars out of five, but opined that the film "benefits from a haunting performance by Romay as the cursed vampire."

== See also ==
- List of Belgian films of the 1970s
- List of French films of 1975
- List of horror films of 1975
