= Mansion of the Living Dead =

1982 film

- Mansion of the Living Dead DVD cover
- La mansión de los muertos vivientes
- Directed by: Jesús Franco
- Screenplay by: Jesús Franco
- Based on: A story by Jesus Franco
- Starring: Candy Coster; Mabel Escano; Robert Foster; Eva León; Antonio Mayans
- Cinematography: Jesús Franco
- Edited by: Jesús Franco
- Music by: Daniel White
- Production company: Golden Films Internacional
- Release date: 1982
- Country: Spain
- Language: Spanish

Mansion of the Living Dead (Spanish: La mansión de los muertos vivientes) is a 1982 erotic horror film written and directed by Jesús Franco, said to be based on his own novel (which never existed). It stars Franco's most often used actress, Lina Romay, who is credited here as Candy Coster. Franco also edited the film, and dubbed the voice of actor Albino Graziani. The make-up on the zombie monks was extremely low budget, consisting mostly of dried shaving cream lather rubbed on the actor's faces.

== Plot ==
Several waitresses visit an almost abandoned resort hotel out of season, only to find that the long-dead monks of the local former monastery have returned as zombies. One by one, a strange force lures the women out of the hotel down into the crypt beneath the monastery, where they are sexually molested and brutally murdered by the zombie monks, all choreographed to eerie music, a tolling bell and the melancholy sound of the wind blowing around the monastery.

== Cast ==
- Candy Coster as Candy
- Mabel Escano as Mabel
- Antonio Mayans as Carlo Savonarola (as Robert Foster)
- Eva León as Olivia
- Albino Graziani as Marleno
- Mari Carmen Nieto as Lea (as Mamie Kaplan)
- Elisa Vela as Caty (as Jasmina Bell)

== Release ==
Severin Films released it on DVD on October 31, 2006, and on BluRay on April 13, 2023.

== Reception ==
Ian Jane of DVD Talk rated it 3.5/5 stars and wrote, "More of an artsy softcore romp than a horror film, Mansion Of The Living Dead should still appeal to those who appreciate the low budget charm of Franco's erotic films and who dig the odd touches that can be found in so much of his work." Rob Lineberger of DVD Verdict wrote that the film consists mostly of boring scenes where the actresses walk around the set.

Writing in The Zombie Movie Encyclopedia, academic Peter Dendle said, "The film is marked throughout, however, by a disturbing hostility toward women: they are sexual objects from the start to the finish, and the voyeuristic impulse would seem less offensive if it weren't accompanied by unashamed misogynistic violence." Dendle called the zombies featured in the film "among the ideological and aesthetic low-points of the species".
