= Frauengefängnis =

1975 film by Jesús Franco

- US theatrical release poster
- Directed by: Jesús Franco
- Written by: Jesús Franco; Connie Grau; Christine Lembach
- Produced by: Erwin C. Dietrich
- Starring: Lina Romay; Monica Swinn; Paul Müller; Ramon Ardid; Jesús Franco
- Cinematography: Jesús Franco
- Edited by: Peter Baumgartner; Marie-Luise Buschke
- Music by: Walter Baumgartner; Daniel White
- Production company: Elite Film
- Release date: 23 April 1976 (West Germany)
- Running time: 81 minutes
- Countries: Switzerland; West Germany
- Language: German

Frauengefängnis (lit. 'Women's Prison', released in the US as Barbed Wire Dolls and in the UK as Caged Women) is a 1975 women-in-prison film directed and co-written by Jesús Franco, produced by Erwin C. Dietrich, and starring Lina Romay, Monica Swinn, and Paul Müller.

== Plot ==
Maria da Guerra kills her father, who was trying to rape her. She is imprisoned in a jail where lesbian wardens torture the inmates.

The women's prison, set on an isolated island, is run by a man who impersonates a doctor, Carlos Costa. In fact, he is a killer who murdered the actual doctor of that name, whose name he then assumed. Assisting him is a monocled lesbian woman known only as The Wardress who regulates the prison with an iron fist. The Wardress reads Nazi volumes such as Albert Speer's history of the Third Reich as leisure reading. She wears jackboots and tight shorts under a white shirt in some scenes. In other scenes she wears a see-through black sheer fabric top.

Due to the practice of placing prisoners in isolation and torturing them (for example, via chaining them naked to a wall just out of reach of food, or placing them naked on a wire-frame bed where they receive electric shocks), several prisoners in the past have died. The current authorities in charge of the prison have concealed this by claiming these prisoners died of heart failure; but they are reaching the point where any more reported 'heart failures' will appear suspicious to the authorities on the mainland.

== Cast ==
- Lina Romay as Maria da Guerra
- Monica Swinn as The Wardress
- Paul Müller as Carlos Costa
- Ramon Ardid as José
- Roger Darton as Milton Warren
- Ronald Weiss as The Warden
- Martine Stedil as Bertha Contrini
- Eric Falk as Nestor
- Peggy Markoff as Pompadour
- Beni Cardoso as Rosaria Cortina
- Jesús Franco as Maria's Father (uncredited)

== Production ==
The prison exteriors were filmed at the Fortaleza de San Fernando in Omoa, Honduras and Fort Carré in Antibes, France. The escape sequence was filmed in the Lancetilla Botanical Garden in Honduras. The rest of the film was shot at Erwin C. Dietrich’s studios in Zurich.

== Release ==
=== Censorship ===
When originally submitted for release in 1976, the British Board of Film Classification rejected it. It was only passed the following year after extensive cuts as was the case in Australia.

== Reception ==
The film has been described as follows: "Typically sleazy women-in-prison nonsense from Franco with the expected nudity, humiliation and torture. Worth watching for the hilarious scene in which Franco attempts to assault the lovely Lina Romay in slow motion."

== Sequels ==
The film was followed by various sequels, including Frauengefängnis 2 and Frauengefängnis 3, directed by Franco, and the 2007 German film Frauengefängnis 4, the last three starring Franco and Romay playing different roles.
