= Night Has a Thousand Desires =

- Directed by: Jesús Franco
- Written by: Jesús Franco
- Starring: Lina Romay
- Cinematography: Jesús Franco
- Edited by: Jesús Franco
- Music by: Daniel White; Jesús Franco
- Production company: Golden Films International S.A.
- Release date: May 11, 1983 (Seville)
- Running time: 93 minutes
- Country: Spain

Night Has a Thousand Desires (Spanish: Mil sexos tiene la noche, lit. 'The Night has a Thousand Sexes') is a 1983 Spanish film directed by Jesús Franco. The film stars Lina Romay as a nightclub entertainer Irina, who uses mind-reading as a performance act. She receives a note on stage and when reading it as part of her act, it reads "You have a few hours to live". Her partner Fabian initially dismisses the note as a prank, but Irina wanders off into the night and commits murders, later being unsure if they were vivid dreams or reality.

Night Has a Thousand Desires was one of the many films Franco had made with Golden Films International, a small production company that allowed Franco complete artistic freedom to develop any kind of film he wanted on his small budget. Night Has a Thousand Desires borrowed narrative from films of Franco's past such Nightmares Come at Night (1973). The director also performed several other technical credits while filming, including being the director of photography and film editor. It was shot in either late 1982 or early 1983 in the Southern provinces of Spain.

== Plot ==
With her business partner and lover, The Great Fabian, The Great Irina performs acts of telepathy as a nightclub entertainer, such as mind-reading. During the show, Fabian becomes disturbed by the presence of a man in the audience whom he recognizes. The man passes a note to Irina to read, and she reads it with her powers, saying, "You have a few hours to live". Fabian dismisses the act as a prank, while Irina becomes depressed and frightened later in her hotel room.

At night, Irina dreams of a sexual encounter with the strange man and his two female friends until a voice that is uttering a strange incantation scares them off. On awakening, she decides to leave the hotel and enters a strange beach house where a woman named Loran greets her with a kiss. Unknown to Irina, Fabian is also present. Both Fabian and Lorna plan to use Irina puppet to rid them of their enemies. Under their control, Irina first stabs a nightclub pianist to death. The next day Fabian convinces her that the experience was just a dream.

The next day, Irina finds herself at a party with the man who gave her the note. As the people at the party get stoned, Irina kills the man and his two female friends. Fabian later sends Irina to the psychiatrist Dr. Harmon, who asks her questions about the confusion she feels about dreams and reality. Irina shortly after commits her next murder shortly after, this time with a young man she meets and kills in a hotel room. She regains consciousness to find a stained knife and blood on her hands and returns to the strange beach house.

== Cast ==
- Lina Romay as Irina
- Daniel Katz as Fabian
- Carman Carrion as Lorna
- Albino Graziani as Ahmed, the first victim
- Mauro Ribera as the male victim at the drug party
- Mari Carmen Nieto as the first party girl
- Alicia Principe as the second party girl
- Jose Llamas as the last victim
- Jesús Franco as Dr. Harmon

== Production ==
In 1981, director Jesús Franco met a married couple from Barcelona, including the husband Emilio Larraga, who were new to the film business and wanted to invest. They were able to provide some money and allowed Franco to have total and complete freedom to develop whatever kind of films he wanted. This led to Franco having a five-year working relationship with their company Golden Films International. The company would produce sixteen films directed by Franco within a five-year period, including Night Has a Thousand Desires.

The genesis of the film's story dates back to the 1960s. La noche tiene ojos (transl. The Night Has Eyes) was an unfilmed project to be directed and written by Franco. It was announced as his next film project in early 1965. The script for the film was rejected by Spanish censor boards, which led him to include elements of it in his later films such as The Diabolical Dr. Z (1965) while the story itself found its way into The Other Side of the Mirror (1973). It would also influence his film Nightmares Come at Night (1973) for which Franco would reuse story elements from for Night Has a Thousand Desires.

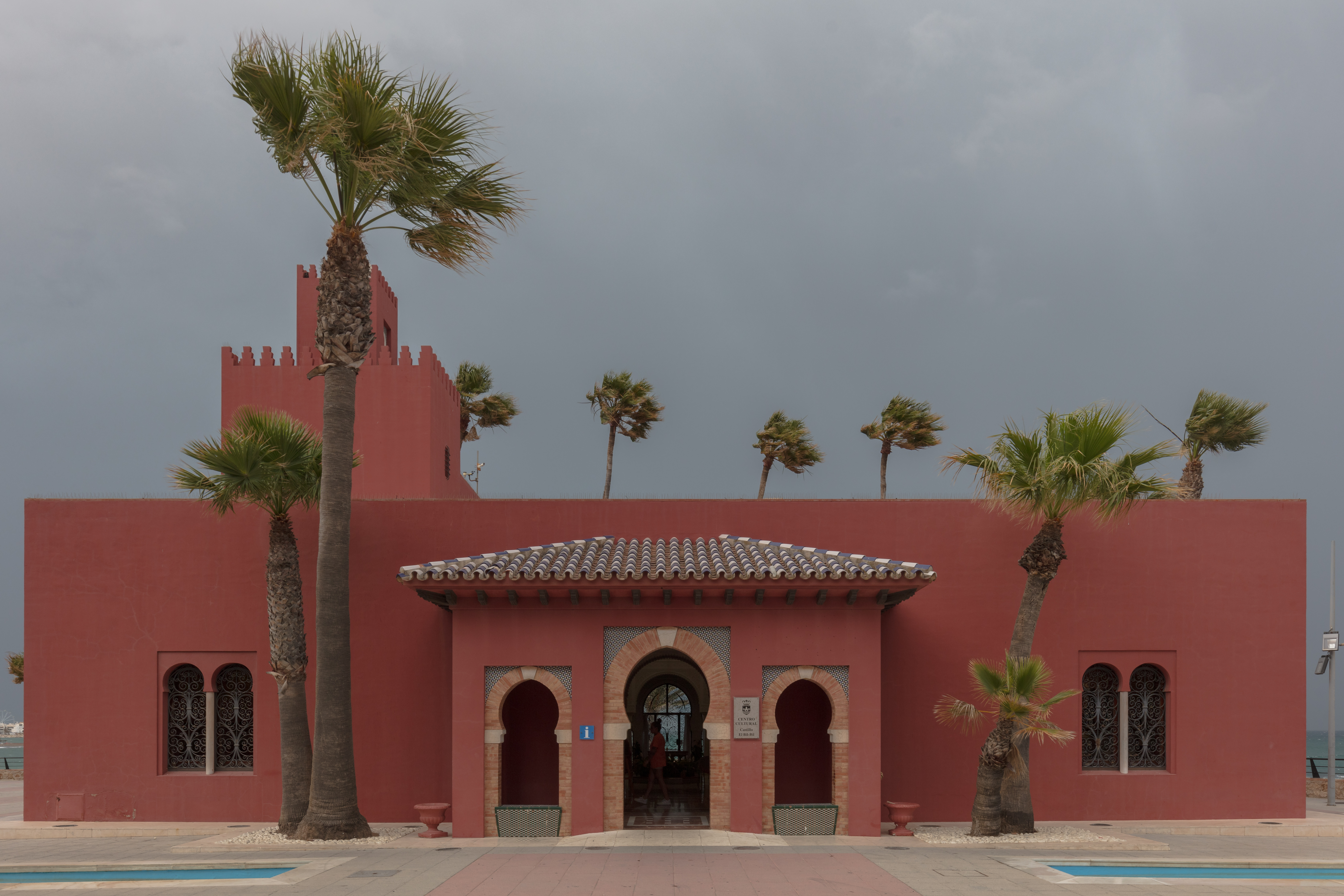
Castillo El Bil Bil was one of the shooting locations in Night Has a Thousand Desires.

Franco worked with a regular cast who lived in the south of Spain, such as Lina Romay. The film was shot back-to-back with Franco's film Historia sexual de O in either late 1982 or early 1983. Beyond being the director, Franco was also the director of photography under the name of Joan Almiral, composed some of the score with Daniel White under the name of Pablo Villa and did uncredited work as the 1st. camera operator and film editor. Franco also appears in a small role as Dr. Harmon, the psychiatrist.

The film's seaside villa is Castillo El Bil Bil located in Benalmádena, Spain. Other locations include Hotel Santa Catalina in Las Palmas.

In Franco's films, the narratives privilege spectacle and excess over unity and logic. A film's plot is often paused to focus on elaborately choreographed scenes of sex and violence in what Antonio Lázaro-Reboll and Ian Olney, the authors of The Films of Jess Franco (2018), described as being made to engage an audience at a visceral level. While this was true for most post-World War II films from Europe for their audiences, Franco's films often feature scenes that go on for several minutes, including the 15-minute orgy scene that is capped with a murder in Night Has a Thousand Desires. Two-thirds of the films running time has no dialogue.

== Release ==
Night Has a Thousand Desires was released theatrically in Spain with a 93-minute running time. It was released in Seville on May 11, 1983, followed by screenings in Barcelona on August 15, 1983, Cartagena on November 28, 1983, and Madrid on March 5, 1984.

Due in part to Larraga's lack of experience in marketing, few of the Golden Films productions by Franco made it onto home video or theatrical releases outside of Spain by 1985. The film was released on Blu-ray by Mondo Macabro in the United States as Night Has a Thousand Desires with a 91-minute running time.

== Reception ==
Reviewing the film in his book Flowers of Perversion: The Delirious Cinema of Jesús Franco (2018), Stephen Thrower said that Franco's technique on display in Night Has a Thousand Desires was "undeniable" as well as that it would be dependent on a viewer's ability to put aside their thirst for information and suspend dramatic expectations.

Thrower described the 15-minute scenes mentioned by Olney and Lázaro-Reboll, writing that "one is left to marvel as he surrenders any sense of sexual intimacy to the dictates of a plunge into madness. Quite what the average cinema punter looking for sexy frolics on a Saturday afternoon would have made of it is anyone's guess!"

== See also ==
- List of Spanish films of 1983
