= Eugenie... The Story of Her Journey into Perversion =

1970 British film by Jesús Franco

Eugenie… The Story of Her Journey into Perversion
- Theatrical poster
- Directed by: Jesús Franco
- Written by: Harry Alan Towers
- Based on: Philosophy in the Bedroom by Marquis de Sade
- Produced by: Harry Alan Towers
- Starring: Marie Liljedahl; Maria Rohm; Jack Taylor; Christopher Lee
- Cinematography: Manuel Merino
- Music by: Bruno Nicolai
- Production company: Video—Tel International Productions
- Distributed by: Distinction Films
- Release dates: 26 December 1969 (London); 5 August 1970 (Los Angeles)
- Running time: 87 minutes
- Country: United Kingdom

Eugenie… The Story of Her Journey into Perversion (Note: Alternate titles include De Sade 70.) is a 1969 British sexploitation horror film directed by Jesús Franco, and starring Maria Rohm, Marie Liljedahl, Jack Taylor, and Christopher Lee. A modern-day adaptation of the Marquis de Sade's book Philosophy in the Bedroom (1795), the film follows a teenage girl who, after accepting an invitation to vacation on an island with a woman and her brother, instead finds herself at the center of a series of disturbing sexual experiments.

Eugenie… The Story of Her Journey into Perversion marked the second of Franco's de Sade-themed films after Marquis de Sade: Justine (1969). It has often been confused with his later and more explicit Eugenie de Sade (filmed in 1970, released 1973), an adaptation of de Sade's short story "Eugénie de Franval" (1800) which starred Soledad Miranda, as both films are often referred to simply as Eugenie. To complicate matters further, the director went on to make a second adaptation of Philosophy in the Bedroom, entitled Eugenie (Historia de una perversión), in 1980.

== Cast ==
- Marie Liljedahl as Eugenie
- Maria Rohm as Madame Saint Ange
- Jack Taylor as Mirvel
- Christopher Lee as Dolmance
- Paul Muller as Mistival

== Production ==
Christopher Lee replaced George Sanders in the film.

== Release ==
The film opened in London on 26 December 1969 and was released theatrically in Los Angeles, California on 5 August 1970.

=== Home media ===
Anchor Bay Entertainment released Eugenie… The Story of Her Journey into Perversion on DVD in the United Kingdom. It was subsequently released on DVD in North America by Blue Underground in 2002. Blue Underground released the film again in a in 2015 in a three-disc limited edition set (featuring Blu-ray and DVD editions of the film, as well as a soundtrack CD), followed by a standalone Blu-ray release in 2020.

== See also ==
- Marquis de Sade in popular culture

== Sources ==
- Mann, Dave (2014). Harry Alan Towers: The Transnational Career a Cinematic Contrarian. Jefferson, North Carolina: McFarland. ISBN 978-0-786-47982-5.
- Olney, Ian (2013). Euro Horror: Classic European Horror Cinema in Contemporary American Culture. Bloomington, Indiana: Indiana University Press. ISBN 978-0-253-00648-6.

Further reading

- Thrower, Stephen; Grainger, Julian (2015). Murderous Passions: The Delirious Cinema of Jesús Franco. London: Strange Attractor Press. ISBN 978-1-907222-31-3.
