= The Sadistic Baron von Klaus =

- French film poster
- Directed by: Jesús Franco
- Screenplay by: Jesús Franco; Juan Cobos; Gonzalo Sebastian de Erice; Pío Ballesteros
- Story by: René Sebille; Jesús Franco
- Produced by: José Lopez Brea
- Cinematography: Godofredo Pacheco
- Edited by: Ángel Serrano
- Music by: Daniel J. White; Jesús Franco
- Production companies: Cooperativa Cinematográfica Albatros; Eurociné
- Distributed by: Hispamex Films (Madrid)
- Release dates: 13 September 1963 (France); October 1963 (Jaén, Spain)
- Countries: Spain; France

The Sadistic Baron von Klaus (Spanish: La mano de un hombre muerto, lit. 'The Hand of a Dead Man') is a 1963 film directed by Jesús Franco. Set in the village in the mountains of Austria, a series of murders of young women are plaguing a village. The murders recall the actions of fifty years earlier of Baron von Klaus. Karl Steiner, a reporter from out of town joins Inspector Borowsky in investigating.

The film originally had a story by René Sebille, but was re-written by Franco and two film critics from the Spanish film magazine Film Ideal. The film began shooting in Northern Spain in late 1962, and was completed in early 1963. The film is a Spanish and French co-production between Cooperativa Cinematografica in Madrid and Eurocine in Paris.

The film was the first production where composer Daniel J. White worked with Franco, leading to many productions together in the future. The film received negative reviews from Cine en 7 dias and Cahiers du Cinéma.

== Plot ==
Set in the village Holfen in the mountains of Austria, a series of murders of young women are plaguing a village. The murders recall the actions of fifty years earlier of Baron von Klaus. Karl Steiner, a reporter from out of town joins Inspector Borowsky in investigating. The suspects are Kalman, a psychiatrist, Max von Klaus, the Baron's descendant, Ludwig, Max's young nephew, and Karin, Max's fiancée.

As Max has no alibi, he is about to be arrested until his lover Lida, a married woman, exonerates him. After another murder occurs, Steiner discovers the truth that Ludwig is the true murderer and alerts Karin. Max von Klaus arrives in time to save Karin but is wounded and commits suicide by sinking into a nearby swamp.

== Production ==
By the second half of September 1962, director Jesús Franco had several projects set up. In September, Spanish magazines announced he would direct Inés de Castro, starring Mercedes Alonso as the famous noblewoman Inês de Castro. This project never developed beyond planning stages, while the head of Cooperativa Cinematográfica Albatros requested shooting permits for a film that would become The Sadistic Baron von Klaus. The film initially started as a co-production between Cooperativa Cinematográfica Albatros and Eurociné, though the participation of the latter production company was unofficial. The head of Eurociné was more interested in funding a horror film than a film noir. Working with young film critics Juan Cobos and Gonzalo Sebastian de Erice from Film Ideal, Franco rewrote most of the original script written by René Sebille. Despite the Gothic ambience, the supernatural elements in the film are a red-herring, with film historians Francesco Cesari and Roberto Curti stating it resembled the German krimi films. When asked about his influences for the film in 2004, Franco responded that he was inspired by films of British filmmakers Walter Forde and Leslie Arliss for The Sadistic Baron von Klaus.

Franco officially discussed the project later in 1962, stating in an interview in Radiocinema magazine that he had signed on for four French co-productions. A few days after the interview, actors Hugo Blanco, Howard Vernon, and Georges Rollin would join the cast. Filming began on November 12, 1962, primarily in Northern Spain, in the provinces of Navarre, Huesca and Guipuzcoa. The film was shot under a French title: L'étrange Baron von Klaus. Filming continued into early 1963.

Daniel J. White arrived within the first two months of 1963 to compose the score for the film. The opening credits sequence features the composer's hands being filmed. It was the first collaboration between White and Franco, with White scoring several of Franco's future productions.

== Release ==
The Sadistic Baron von Klaus had a private screening at the Cine Club Universitario in Salamanca, Spain in March 1963. In France, it was released on September 13, 1963, as Le Sadique Baron von Klaus. The film was released throughout Spain in October 1963 in Jaén and Valencia, Barcelona on January 27, 1964, and Almería on January 30, 1964.

The Spanish presentation of the film removed the scenes involving Sadomasochism with actress Gogó Rojo, while the French and Belgian theatrical releases maintained them. In the French screenings, the silent prologue and opening murder are missing.

The film was distributed by Hispamex Films in Madrid. The film was exported to other countries such as Italy and Venezuela but failed to receive the financial success of his previous film The Awful Dr. Orloff (1962). It was released in English home video as The Sadistic Baron von Klaus.

== Reception ==
In Spain, Ruiz Burton, the critic of Cine en 7 dias said the film lowered his confidence in Jesús Franco as a filmmaker, as previously he offered the audience "something", stating he felt the script was absurdly made and the direction was no different. A review in the French film magazine Cahiers du Cinéma described the film as frustrating and not even worthy of his previous film The Awful Dr. Orloff, writing that Franco failed to create atmosphere, sketch characters or tell a story.
