= Gaston Crunelle =

French classical flutist and teacher (1898–1990

- Born: 18 August 1898; Douai, France
- Died: 13 January 1990 (aged 91)
- Genres: Classical
- Occupations: Performer, teacher
- Instrument: Flute

Gaston Crunelle (18 August 1898 in Douai – 13 January 1990) was a French classical flutist and teacher.

After earning a first prize in flute in 1914 at the Douai Conservatory studying under Auguste Bernard, Crunelle studied in Paris with Adolphe Hennebains, Léopold Lafleurance, and Philippe Gaubert. At the Paris Conservatory, he won a rare prix d'excellence, a first prize in which the jury's vote was unanimous.

Crunelle was one of the most widely recorded flutists of his generation. He served as principal flutist of the Pasdeloup Orchestra from 1924 until 1945, principal flutist of the orchestra of the Paris Opéra-Comique from 1933 until 1964, and flutist of the Quintette Instrumental de Paris, also known as the Quintette Pierre Jamet, from 1940-1965.

As professor of flute at the Conservatoire de Paris from 1941 to 1969, Crunelle taught more than 135 first prize winners.

Jean-Pierre Rampal (premier prix 1944) succeeded him in 1969.

In addition to Rampal, he taught numerous flutists, including Pierre-Yves Artaud, Jean-Louis Beaumadier, Leone Buyse, Roger Cotte, Michel Debost, James Galway, Jean-Claude Gérard, Christian Lardé, Maxence Larrieu, and Alexander Murray.

Numerous works were dedicated to him, including Agrestide (1942) by Eugène Bozza, Sonatine (1943) by Henri Dutilleux, Chant de Linos (1944) by André Jolivet, and Sonatine (1946) by Pierre Sancan.
