= Claude Pierson =

French filmmaker

Claude Pierson (17 November 1930 – 19 March 1997) (also known as Caroline Joyce, Carolyne Joyce, Carolyn Joyce, Andrée Marchand, André Marchand and Paul Martin) was a French film director, writer and producer.

His most famous film is Justine de Sade (1972), with Alice Arno in the lead role, the most faithful adaptation of the famous work of the Marquis de Sade. His other films included Oh, If Only My Monk Would Want (Ah! Si mon moine voulait...), a French-Canadian coproduction, in 1973.
