= Film Ideal =

Biweekly film magazine in Spain (1956–1970)

- Categories: Film magazine
- Frequency: Biweekly
- Publisher: Publicaciones Populares Católicas
- Founded: 1956
- First issue: October 1956
- Final issue: 1970
- Country: Spain
- Based in: Madrid
- Language: Spanish

Film Ideal was a biweekly film magazine, which was published in Madrid, Spain, between 1956 and 1970.

== History and profile ==
The first issue of Film Ideal appeared in October 1956. The founders were Félix Martialay, José Maria Pérez Lozano, Juan Cobos, and two Jesuits, José A. Sobrino and Félix de Landaburu. Its headquarters was in Madrid. It was modeled on the French movie magazine Cahiers du cinéma. The magazine was published by Publicaciones Populares Católicas on a biweekly basis.

Film Ideal initially covered articles about the Hollywood films. It also published the film critics and reviews. Critics contributed to the magazine included Manolo Marinero and Terenci Moix. Although it was a moderate publication and had a Catholic stance until 1962, then it adopted a militant stance. During the period from its start in 1956 to 1962 the magazine had the idea that cinema was one of the significant tools to reinforce Catholic doctrine and morality. Due to the fact that José Maria Pérez Lozano left the magazine to direct another film magazine, Cinestudio which was launched in May 1961, the stance of the magazine changed, and it began to support new Spanish cinema. Film Ideal suffered several serious crisis, leading to changes in its frequency, and finally folded in 1970.
