= Philosophy in the Bedroom =

1795 book by the Marquis de Sade

Philosophy in the Boudoir
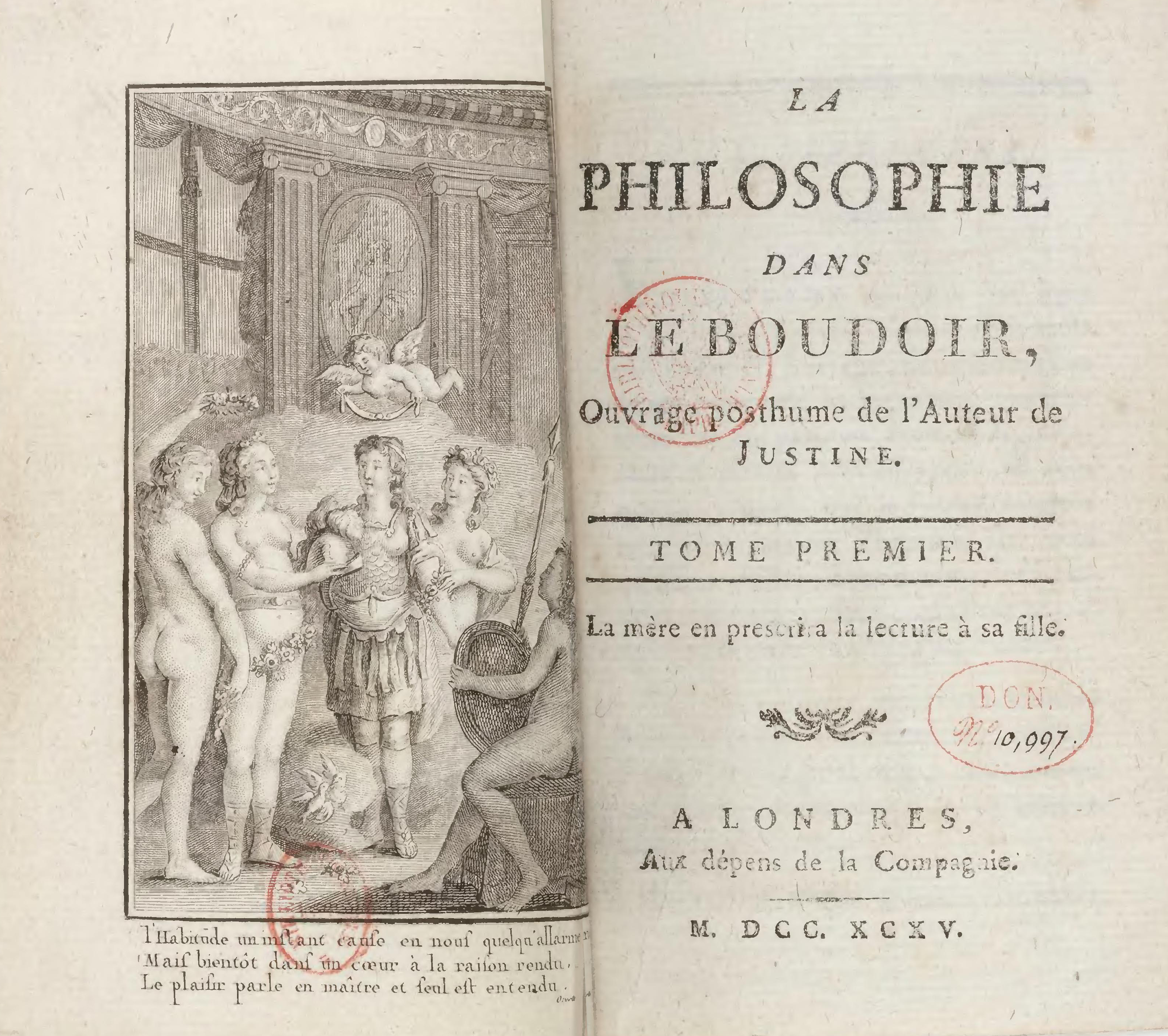
- Author: Marquis de Sade
- Original title: La philosophie dans le boudoir
- Translator: Richard Seaver & Austryn Wainhouse
- Genre: Philosophical literature
- Published: 1971 (Grove Press, New York)

Philosophy in the Boudoir (French: La philosophie dans le boudoir), often mistranslated as Philosophy in the Bedroom, is a 1795 book by the Marquis de Sade written in the form of a dramatic dialogue. Set in a boudoir, the two lead characters make the argument that the only moral system that reinforces the recent political revolution is libertinism, and that if the people of France fail to adopt the libertine philosophy, France will be destined to return to a monarchic state.

In the chapter titled "Fifth Dialogue", there is a lengthy section where the character Chevalier reads a philosophical pamphlet titled "Frenchmen, Some More Effort If You Wish to Become Republicans". This represents Sade's philosophy on religion and morality, a philosophy Sade hopes the citizens of France will embrace and codify into the laws of their new republican government. Throughout the text, Sade makes the argument that one must embrace atheism, reject society's beliefs about pleasure and pain, and contends that if any crime is committed while seeking pleasure, it cannot be condemned.

== Plot ==
In the introduction, the Marquis de Sade exhorts his readers to indulge in the various activities in the play. He says that the work is dedicated to "voluptuaries of all ages, of every sex" and urges readers to emulate the characters. "Lewd women", he writes, "let the voluptuous Saint-Ange be your model; after her example, be heedless of all that contradicts pleasure's divine laws, by which all her life she was enchained." He then urges "young maidens" to copy Eugénie; "be as quick as she to destroy, to spurn all those ridiculous precepts inculcated in you by imbecile parents". Finally, he urges male readers to "study the cynical Dolmancé" and follow his example of selfishness and consideration for nothing but his own enjoyment.

Dolmancé is the most dominant of the characters in the dialogue. He explains to Eugénie that morality, compassion, religion, and modesty are all absurd notions that stand in the way of the sole aim of human existence: pleasure. Like most of Sade's work, Philosophy in the Bedroom features a great deal of sex as well as libertine philosophies. Despite the text featuring torture, the dialogue contains no actual murder, unlike many of Sade's works.

Dolmancé and Madame de Saint-Ange start off by giving Eugénie their own brand of sex education, explaining the biological facts and declaring that physical pleasure is a far more important motive for sex than that of reproduction. Both characters explain that she will not be able to feel "true pleasure" without pain. They then eagerly begin practical lessons, with Le Chevalier joining them in the fourth act and swiftly helping to take away Eugénie's virginity.

Eugénie is instructed on the pleasures of various sexual practices and she proves to be a fast learner. As is usually the case in Sade's work, the characters are all bisexual, and sodomy is the preferred activity of all concerned, especially Dolmancé, who prefers male sexual partners and will not have anything other than anal intercourse with females. Madame de Saint-Ange and her younger brother, the Chevalier, also have sex with one another, and boast of doing so regularly. Their incest — and all manner of other sexual activity and taboos, such as sodomy, adultery, and homosexuality — is justified by Dolmancé in a series of energetic arguments that can ultimately be summarised by, "If it feels good, do it." The Marquis de Sade's ultimate argument throughout the text is that if a crime (even murder) took place during one's desire for pleasure, it could not be punished by law. Sodomy was illegal and punishable by death in France until 1791 (though the last execution occurred in 1750) — four years before the dialogue was written, and Sade was convicted of sodomy in 1772.

The corruption of Eugénie is actually at the request of her father, who has sent her to Madame de Saint-Ange for the very purpose of having his daughter stripped of the morality that her virtuous mother taught her.

The dialogue is split into seven parts, or "dialogues", and was originally illustrated by Sade. There is a lengthy section within the fifth dialogue titled "Yet Another Effort, Frenchmen, If You Would Become Republicans", in which the Marquis de Sade argued that having done away with the monarchy in the French Revolution, the people of France should take the final step towards liberty by abolishing religion too. "Frenchmen, I repeat it to you: Europe awaits her deliverance from scepter and censer alike. Know well that you cannot possibly liberate her from royal tyranny without at the same time breaking for her the fetters of religious superstition; the shackles of the one are too intimately linked to those of the other; let one of the two survive, and you cannot avoid falling subject to the other you have left intact. It is no longer before the knees of either an imaginary being or a vile impostor a republican must prostrate himself; his only gods must now be courage and liberty. Rome disappeared immediately Christianity was preached there, and France is doomed if she continues to revere it".

In the final act, Eugénie's mother, Madame de Mistival, arrives to rescue her daughter from the "monsters" who have corrupted her. Eugénie's father, however, warns his daughter and friends in advance and urges them to punish his wife, whose person and virtue he clearly loathes. Madame de Mistival is horrified to find that not only her husband arranged for their daughter's corruption but also Eugénie has already lost any moral standards that she previously possessed, along with any respect or obedience towards her mother. Eugénie refuses to leave, and Madame de Mistival is soon stripped, beaten, whipped, and raped, her daughter taking an active part in this brutality and even declaring her wish to kill her mother. Dolmancé eventually calls in for a servant who has syphilis to rape Eugénie's mother. Eugénie sews up her vagina and Dolmancé her anus to keep the polluted seed inside, and she is then sent home in tears since she knows that her daughter has been lost to the corrupt libertine mentality of Dolmancé and his accomplices.

== Characters ==
- Eugénie, a 15-year-old girl who at the beginning of the dialogue is a virgin, naïve of all things sexual, who has been brought up by her mother to be well-mannered, modest, decent and obedient.
- Madame de Saint-Ange, a 26-year-old libertine woman who is the owner of the house and bedroom in which the dialogue is set. She invites Eugénie for a two-day course on being libertine.
- Le Chevalier de Mirval, Madame de Saint-Ange's 20-year-old brother. He aids his sister and Dolmancé in the ordeal of "educating" Eugénie.
- Dolmancé, a 36-year-old atheist and bisexual (though with a strong preference for men), and friend of Le Chevalier's. He is Eugénie's foremost teacher and "educator".
- Madame de Mistival, Eugénie's provincial, self-righteous mother.
- Augustin, Madame de Saint-Ange's eighteen- or twenty-year-old gardener. Summoned to assist in the sexual activities in the fifth dialogue.

== Legacy ==
Spanish director Jesús Franco has made two films based on Philosophy in the Bedroom: Eugenie… The Story of Her Journey into Perversion (1970) and Eugenie (Historia de una perversión) (1980). Italian director Aurelio Grimaldi also filmed it, as L'educazione sentimentale di Eugenie (2005). In 2003, a play based on Philosophy in the Bedroom titled "XXX" was staged in a number of European cities. It featured live simulated sex and audience interaction that caused some controversy.
