= Lina Romay =

Spanish actress

- Born: Rosa María Almirall Martínez; 25 June 1954; Barcelona, Catalonia, Spain
- Died: 15 February 2012 (aged 57); Málaga, Andalusia, Spain
- Other names: Candy Coster, Lulu Laverne
- Spouses: Ramon Ardid (m. 1972; div. 1978) Jesús Franco (m. 2008)

Rosa María Almirall Martínez (25 June 1954 – 15 February 2012), known by the stage name Lina Romay, was a Spanish actress and filmmaker. She often appeared in films directed by her long-time companion, and later husband, Jesús Franco. She appeared in approximately 109 Franco films made over a 37-year period, from 1973 to 2010. She sometimes used the pseudonyms Candy Coster and Lulu Laverne.

== Early life ==
Romay was born Rosa María Almirall Martínez in Barcelona on June 25, 1954. She attended high school at Lope de Vega between 1964 to 1970. After graduating high school, she enrolled in the Massana Art School, where she met and married actor/photographer Ramon Ardid (aka Raymond Hardy). She began acting in amateur stage productions.

Romay first met Franco when he and a friend came to see her troupe's performance of Terra Baixa. After the play ended, Franco offered her a role in one of his films. Her husband at the time, Ramon Ardid, was working for Franco as a still photographer. Her first film with Franco was Relax Baby, but the movie was never released.

== Career ==
She began appearing in Jesús Franco's films when they met in 1972, adopting the stage name Lina Romay after an actress and jazz artist from the 1940s. She also used the stage names, Candy Coster and Lulu Laverne, stating, "I'm Lina Romay when I have brown hair, Candy Coster when I have blonde hair, and Lulu Laveme when I have red hair." Franco cast her in her first lead role in his 1973 film The Female Vampire.

She acted in over a hundred feature films, most directed by Franco. A self-confessed exhibitionist, the majority of their films together were in the erotic film genre (including many X titles featuring unsimulated sex scenes), but she also appeared in many of his horror, comedy, and action/adventure films as well. Among the better known of her horror films are The Bare Breasted Countess (1973), Barbed Wire Dolls (1975) and Jack the Ripper (1976). Ardid co-starred with her in several of Franco's films until he realized she was having an affair with him in 1975. The divorce of Romay and Ardid was finalized in 1978, and Ardid stopped working with Franco after 1980.

Although Romay was listed in the credits of several of Franco's films as a co-director, actor Antonio Mayans stated in a 2019 interview that Franco used to credit her in that manner for business reasons, and that she never actually co-directed any of the films. However, she contributed occasional plot ideas and assisted in the editing room.

== Personal life and death ==
Romay was a polyglot, speaking Spanish, Catalan, French, Portuguese, Italian, and English.

Lina Romay and Jesús Franco lived as a couple for almost four decades but only officially married on 25 April 2008. She died from cancer at the age of 57 on 15 February 2012 in Málaga, Spain. Franco died a little over a year later, in April 2013.

== Selected filmography ==
=== Feature films ===
Film performances
Year	Title	Role	Notes
1973	The Erotic Rites of Frankenstein	Esmeralda, the gypsy	
1974	How to Seduce a Virgin	Davey's girlfriend	
1974	The Lustful Amazons	Yuka, the priestess	
1974	Exorcism	Anna	
1974	Lorna the Exorcist	Linda Barielle	
1974	Countess Perverse	Sylvia Aguado	
1974	Night of the Skull	Rita Derian, Lord Marian's daughter	
1974	Célestine, An All Round Maid	Célestine	
1974	Le Jouisseur	Loulou	
1975	Female Vampire	Irina, Countess of Karlstein	
1975	Les Gloutonnes	Bianca	
1975	Les Chatouilleuses	Loulou	
1975	Les Grandes Emmerdeuses	Pina	
1975	The Hot Nights of Linda	Olivia Radeck	Called Olivia Steiner in the French prints
1975	Barbed Wire Dolls	Maria da Guerra, prisoner	
1975	Le Miroir obscéne	Marie	
1976	Julietta 69	Justine	
1976	Midnight Party	Sylvia Sanders, a stripper	Character named Laura in the Spanish version
1976	Downtown	Cynthia Ramos' aka "Annette"; stage name ‘Cynthia La Belle”	
1976	Jack the Ripper	Marika Hoffman	
1976	Die Marquise de Sade	Lady Doriana Gray and her twin sister	
1977	Ilsa the Wicked Warden	Juana Marez, prisoner no. 10	
1977	Women Behind Bars	Shirley Fields, Perry Mendoza’s love	
1977	Die Sklavinnen	Madame, Princess Arminda	
1977	Kiss Me Killer	Moira Ray, a stripper	
1978	Wicked Woman	Margerita Martin	
1978	Tender and Perverse Emanuelle	Greta Douglas, Gordon's sister	
1978	The Sinister Eyes of Dr. Orloff	Adéle	
1979	Elles font tout	Nini la fesse, a porno star	
1980	Sinfonia Erótica	Martine De Bressac	Credited as Candice Coster
1980	Opalo de fuego (Mercaderes del sexo)	Cécile Le Pen	Credited as Candy Coster
1981	Eugénie Historia de una perversion	Sultana aka Princess Irina Von Karlstein	Credited as Candy Coster
1981	Aberraciones sexuales de una mujer casada	George's Mother	
1981	The Girls of the Copacabana	Lia, Hans's seductress	
1981	The Sadist of Notre Dame	Anne	
1981	Pick-up Girls	Bijou	Characters name is "Pussy" in UK prints.
1981	The Cannibals	Anna/Diana, Jeremy’s nurse	Credited as Candy Coster
1981	El Sexo est á loco	Marcia/Ms. Fonseca/ Cookie	Credited as Candy Coster
1982	La Noche de los sexos abiertos	Moira	
1982	Botas negras, látigo de cuero	Lina Daniel	Credited as Candy Coster
1982	Macumba Sexual	Alice Brooks	Credited as Candy Coster
1983	El hotel de los ligues	Eva Bombón	Credited as Candy Coster
1983	La casa de las mujeres perdidas	Desdemona Pontecorvo	Credited as Candy Coster
1983	El hundimiento de la casa Usher	Maria, Usher's housekeeper and mistress	
1983	Confesiones íntimas de una exhibicionista	Candy aka 'Velvet Tongue'	Credited as Candy Coster
1983	Gemidos de placer	Julia	
1983	Night Has a Thousand Desires	Irina	
1983	Mansion of the Living Dead	Candy	Credited as Candy Coster
1983	Diamonds of Kilamandjaro	Hermione De Winter, Diana's mother	
1983	La tumba de los muertos vivientes	Kurt's wife	
1983	Camino solitario	Eva Raden/Adriana Esteba	Credited as Candy Coster
1984	¿Cuánto cobra un espía?	Ana	
1984	Lilian (la virgen pervertida)	Irina, nightclub owner	Credited as Candy Coster
1984	Una rajita para dos	Agent 69/89?	Credited as Lulu La Verne
1985	Un pito para tres	Lulu, a porn star	Credited as Lulu Laverne
1985	El ojete de Lulú	Lulú	Credited as Lulú Laverne
1985	Entre pitos anda el juego	Candy	Credited as Candy Coster
1985	El chupete de Lulú	Lulú	Credited as Lulú Laverne
1986	El mirón y la exhibicionista	The exhibitionist	Credited as Lulu Laverne
1986	Para las nenas... leche calentita	Chelo Cucufate	Credited as Lulu Laverne
1986	Furia en el trópico	Marga Lopez	
1986	Las chuponas	Lulu	Credited as Lulu Laverne
1986	Sangre en mis zapatos	Paquita la Fina	Credited as Candy Coster
1986	Sola ante el terror	Melissa Calvo	Credited as Candy Coster
1987	Phollastia	Barbara Carrington	
1988	Faceless	Mme. Orloff	
1988	Phalo crest	Maggie Channing	Credited as Brenda Haven
1995	Downtown Heat	Melissa	
1996	La sombra del judoka contra el Dr.Wong	Mari	
1998	Tender Flesh	Gorgona Radek	
2001	Lust for Frankenstein	Moira Frankenstein	
2001	Mari-Cookie and the Killer Tarantula in 8 Legs to Love You	Mari-Cookie/Tarantula	
2002	Dr. Wong's Virtual Hell	Nelly Smith & Tsai Ming	Credited as Candice Coster
2002	Vampire Blues	Marga, a Gypsy Fortune-teller	
2002	Red Silk	Tina	Credited as Lulu Laverne
2002	Blind Target	Tora	
2002	Vampire Junction	Alice Brown	
2002	Incubus	Rosa Harker	
2002	Killer Barbys vs. Dracula	Comrade Irina von Karstein	
2002	Kárate a muerte en Torremolinos	Unknown acting role	
2004	Broken Dolls	Tona Martin	
2004	Helter Skelter	Madame Champville	
2005	Las flores de las pasión	The voyeur's ex girlfriend	
2005	Flores de perversión	Madame Augustina Villeblanche	
2005	Snakewoman	Dr. Van Helsing	
2008	La cripta de las mujeres malditas	Voice-over	
2011	Paula-paula	Alma	
—N/a	Rolls Royce Baby	—N/a	
—N/a	Love Letters of a Nun	—N/a	
—N/a	Los Blues de la calle pop	Genara Winston, aka Butterfly	
—N/a	Bahia blanca	Maria	
—N/a	Las últimas de Filipinas	Cecilia Muro	Also an assistant director as R.M. Almirall
—N/a	Esclavas del crimen	Tsai Chin, Fu Manchu's daughter	
—N/a	Esmeralda Bay	Loletta, brothel madam	Also the film editor, credited as Rosy Almirall
—N/a	Rossa venezia		

Film credits
Title	Shooting Years	Release Year	Credited as				Notes	Ref(s)
Title	Shooting Years	Release Year	Assistant director	Writer	Editor	Other	Notes	Ref(s)
Camino solitario	1983	1983	Yes				Credited as Rosa M. Almiral	
Una rajita para dos	1983	1984	Yes				Credited as Aldo Pajini	
Un pito para tres	1983-1984	1985		Yes	Yes		Uncredited	
¿Cuánto cobra un espía?	1984	1984	Yes				Credited as Rosa Almirall	
El ojete de Lulú	1985	1985		Yes	Yes		Credited as Candy Coster	
Entre pitos anda el juego	1985	1985		Yes	Yes		Credited as Lulu Laverne	
El chupete de Lulú	1985	1985		Yes	Yes		Credited as Lulu Laverne	
El mirón y la exhibicionista	1985	1986		Yes	Yes		Credited as Lulu Laverne	
Para las nenas... leche calentita	1985	1986		Yes	Yes		Credited as Candy Coster	
Las chuponas	1982-1984	1986		Yes	Yes		Credited as Candy Coster	
Las chuponas	1982-1984	1987		Yes	Yes		Credited as Candy Coster	
Viaje a Bangkok, ataúd includido	1984	1987	Yes				Credited as Rosa Ma. Almirall	
Phollastia	1987	1987		Yes			Credited as L.L. Laverne	
Phalo Crest	1987	1988		Yes			Credited as Preston Quaid	
Dark Mission	1987	1988			Yes		Credited as Rosa M. Almirall	
Killer Barbys	1996	1996			Yes	Yes	Also credited as script supervisor. Credited as Rosa Ma. Almirall	
Tender Flesh	1996	1998			Yes		Credited as Rosa María Almirall	
Incubus	1999	2004	Yes				Credited as the 1st assistant director	
Blind Target	2000	2002				Yes	Credited as the "blood-wrangler".	
Helter Skelter	2000	2004	Yes				Credited as the 1st assistant director as Rosa Almirall	
Vampire Junction	2001	2002	Yes		Yes		Credited as the 1st assistant director	
Incubus	2002	2002	Yes				Credited as the 1st assistant director	
Las flores de las pasión	2002	2005	Yes				Credited as the 1st assistant director as Rosa Almirall	
Flores de perversión	2002	2005	Yes				Credited as the 1st assistant director as Rosa Almirall	
Snakewoman	2005	2005	Yes	Yes			Credited as Rosa Amirall	
La cripta de las mujeres malditas	2007-2008	2008	Yes			Yes	Credited as the art director, make-up, and second-unit director	
Paula-paula	2009	2011				Yes	Credited for story, dialogue and make-up as Rosa Maria Almirall	
Las últimas de Filipinas	1984	—N/a	Yes				Credited as R.M. Almirall	
Esmeralda Bay	1988	—N/a			Yes		Credited as Rosy Almirall	

Short films
Title	Shooting Year	Release Year	Credited as		Notes	Ref(s)
Title	Shooting Year	Release Year	Director	Screenwriter	Notes	Ref(s)
El huésped de la niebla	1982	—N/a	Yes	Yes	Credited as Rosa M. Almiral	
El tren expreso	1982	—N/a	Yes	Yes	Credited as Rosa M. Almiral	
