= Eurociné =

French film production company

- Type: Private
- Industry: Film production
- Founded: 19 February 1937 (as Films BAP)
- Headquarters: Paris, France
- Website: eurocine.net

Eurociné, formerly Films BAP, is a French independent film production and distribution company owned by the Lesoeur family since 1957, and tracing its corporate lineage to 1937. It technically is France's third oldest film company after Gaumont and Pathé, although it has gone through several bouts of inactivity.

Operating under director Robert Péguy before and immediately after World War II, it specialized in family fare. Following a period of dormancy, it was acquired by Marius Lesoeur, who repurposed it as an outlet for some pioneering co-productions with Spain, many of which involved cult helmer Jesús Franco. In the 1970s, Lesoeur and his son Daniel became lead producers, abandoning all artistic pretense to churn out exploitation quickies, a number of which recycled existing footage under collective pseudonyms. In the late 80s, Eurociné returned to more respectable pictures headlined by mid-level Anglo-Saxon stars, but they did not generate the expected revenue, and it has focused on sales ever since.

== History ==
=== Films BAP (1937 to 1957) ===
Eurociné traces its lineage to Films BAP, a company created by French film pioneer Robert Péguy and Charles Battesti, the owner of a Saint-Maur-des-Fossés theatre called Cinéma de l'Horloge. The firm was formally established on 19 February 1937 in Paris, although Battesti and Péguy had already worked under the BAP label in 1935–36. The company's star was Jacotte Muller, or "Little Jacotte", a child actress discovered at the Théâtre du petit monde, a stage venue for young performers created by Pierre Humble, who collaborated to some of her vehicles. Roger Tréville was another company regular. Although BAP was cleared by occupation authorities to operate during World War II, Péguy did not produce any work for the company during the conflict. Péguy's post World War II projects were unsuccessful and the company went dormant.

=== Eurociné (1957 onwards) ===
==== Acquisition by Lesoeur and rebrand ====
Marius Lesoeur, movie producer with the SOPADEC company and one-time carnival owner, took a stake in BAP Films in 1957. He bought out Battesti and Péguy in 1958. Eurociné's official history ambiguously states that Lesoeur "discovered that film was a continuation of his life as a traveling entertainer" during the shooting of BAP's 1937 production Monsieur Breloque Has Disappeared, before taking full control of the company years later. In a 1999 interview, Marius' son Daniel gave another circuitous explanation: "The Eurociné company was founded in 1937. The film Grandfather [a 1938 BAP production] was produced under our imprint, although someone else served as executive producer at the time. Founder Marius Lesoeur, my father, made his first appearance as a producer with the film Une Belle Garce [a 1946 picture not made by BAP]." French film historian Christophe Bier found no evidence that the elder Lesoeur participated in any BAP films, and suggests that the family may be blurring the lines regarding his achievements, harkening back to carnival showmanship.

Lesoeur, using BAP's former corporate entity, appears to have started doing business as Eurociné around 1960, although it co-existed with SOPADEC for a brief period. In those early years, André Castillon, a jeweller from Gers and fellow résistant, was nominally listed as Eurociné's manager. Lesoeur also released some films through an affiliate called Eurocinéac (short for "Euro Ciné Action"), which was managed by Georges Estin. Marius' son Daniel joined his father shortly after his takeover of Eurociné in the early 1960s, first working assistant jobs before graduating to executive roles.

==== Minority co-productions ====
At that time, Marius Lesoeur focused on co-productions with Spain, whose cheap labor provided him with solid films at a much lower cost than his home country. But even then, he remained a minority producer, merely trading francophone rights against an investment as small as a few ten-thousand francs, which often went uncredited for regulatory reasons. After a period of film noirs and musicals, whose real-life parallels exposed him to the wims of Spanish censorship, Lesoeur became one of the backers of Eduardo Manzanos Brochero's Golden City, Spain's first Western set. Against the objections of Manzanos, who did not believe they could emulate an American setting, he pushed to replace the Spanish character El Coyote with the Californian Zorro, who held broader appeal and paved the way for the Eurowestern boom. After joining Manzanos and Lesoeur for another Zorro, Italian producer Alberto Grimaldi suggested the Frenchman invest a larger amount in a project with Sergio Leone. To his later regret, Lesoeur chose the safe option and declined, sealing his company's fate as a minor player. Problems encountered by Lesoeur on some relatively ambitious, pre-Eurociné films, may have contributed to his risk averse approach.

Following a pair of fluff musicals, Eurociné's third collaboration with director Jesús Franco begat the seminal The Awful Dr. Orloff (1962), which kickstarted the era of Spanish Fantaterror. After seeing the film, Amando de Ossorio approached Lesoeur to pitch him his own horror debut, Malenka, but the producer passed on it in favor of another western, Tomb of the Pistolero, and the film was not made until years later. Nazario Belmar, the Catholic backer of Franco's post-Orloff effort Death Whistles the Blues, attempted to steer him towards a career as one of Spain's high-brow filmmakers, which at one point had been his dream. But, finding Lesoeur's business model a better outlet for his urge to film, he broke up with the former and signed up for Eurociné's The Sadistic Baron von Klaus. Both Lesoeur and Franco would frequently revisit the horror genre, which they later infused with more overt erotic influences.

==== Lead producer and grindhouse years ====
Mainstream co-productions dried up after a few years, but genres ushered in by the sexual revolution provided Lesoeur with new low-risk opportunities. In 1968, Eurociné made their first feature as main producer with the pseudo-social guidance film Nathalie l'amour s'éveille (lit. 'Nathalie, Love's Awakening'), also their first to be directed by French veteran Pierre Chevalier. In its heyday, the company released five or six films a year. Their themes were chosen during bimonthly meetings with France's six independent regional distributors. Even in the Gallic market, these films were not widely seen, but they were good sellers in developing countries. Foreign distributors, especially Italian ones at MIFED (Mercato internazionale del film e del documentario), also provided key pointers. The success of Salon Kitty created demand for Nazisploitation product, and Eurociné obliged, although their films were considered tamer than others in that niche.

The Lesoeurs' production ethos, which emphasized marquee appeal over the films' actual contents, has been construed by some as a reflection of their sideshow roots. Daniel Lesoeur simply defined his family as "artisans". Crews were very small, and actors were often not provided with a script in advance. Many scenes from their movies were shot at the company's small Champs-Élysées offices or at the Lesoeur's secondary residence in Soisy-sur-École, where they stored props and furnished several sets. According to Franco, this mindset was compounded by Daniel Lesoeur's promotion to producer. The company became infamous for its use of stock footage, and some new films were built from the ground up to recycle large chunks of a previous one. While Daniel has downplayed the practice's frequency, a few of the company's respectable 1960s Westerns did receive a sexed up makover.

Franco's status with the Lesoeurs typically exempted him from having to build his films entirely around others', and despite escapades with better producers like Harry Alan Towers, he found the freedom of working for them to be worth the compromises as it resulted in two of his favorite works, Female Vampire and The Sadist of Notre Dame. However, directors with less leverage were not as well treated, decrying not only the Lesoeurs' untenable budgetary limitations, but their tendency to deflect blame onto them. During the mid 1970s, softcore was superseded by hardcore pornography. Eurociné seldom dealt in the genre, but some of the many alternate versions it churned out featured explicit inserts. Franco accepted that at least some of Daniel's tinkering was dictated by the changing French marketplace, and collaborated to these.

==== Broadening genres and English-language films ====
Not desiring to venture into full-on hardcore, the Lesoeurs returned to fantasy films. Mimicking their Italian peers, they ventured into the latest zombie, cannibal and sword-and-sorcery trends, a stark departure from the stripped-down Gothic of their earlier efforts. The resulting movies, such as Zombie Lake, Cannibal Terror and Golden Temple Amazons, were profitable but their more complex visual demands proved ill-suited for Eurociné's artisanal infrastructure, and they were met with consternation by genre enthusiasts. According to Jean Rollin, who worked for Eurociné as a film doctor, the Lesoeurs were unfazed by their product's lack of professionalism.

In 1981, Daniel Lesoeur attended the newly-created American Film Market, which gave him new insight on North American distribution avenues. In 1983, Eurociné sold a horror package to U.S. TV syndicator Cinema Shares International. In 1985, several of its films were acquired by Charles Band as part of a package put together by international sales broker JER Films, which he released through his Wizard and Force Video labels. Band also repackaged these titles with new art, and relaunched them through the sales division of his own Empire International.

While the ready-made Spanish dubs that came with many of his co-productions gave him a slight boost, Lesoeur soon found that Anglophone distributors were unwilling to pay any sizeable amounts for dubbed material. After a few, unsuccessful attempts to have French actors speak English on set, Daniel enrolled the English-fluent Sybil Danning for the girls-with-guns film The Panther Squad, a successful video pickup for Vestron. From then on, the Lesoeurs made the choice to invest in more films with Anglophone actors. These early global efforts remained modest in scope, with budgets between FF1 and 2 million. By the mid-1980s, half of the company's revenue came from foreign territories, a rarity in the French film business.

==== Non-exploitation films and end of production ====
With the decline of neighborhood theatres in the late 1980s, Eurociné launched a series of projects that increasingly eschewed exploitation in favor of more serious material. Starting with 1988's Dark Mission, these films featured more upscale talent like Mark Hamill, Christopher Lee, Robert Forster and George Kennedy. They cost up to five times more than the old-style Eurociné productions, however their budgets remained too limited given their loftier, mainstream ambitions. Even in France, they were dropped straight-to-video in a bulk 1996 release, years after they were made.

More crucially, Eurociné's efforts to secure U.S. distribution remained hit-and-miss, and the failure of the last and costliest film in the cycle, Night of the Eagles, to do so forced the company to abandon production altogether. This also marked the most serious breakup in Eurociné's relationship with Franco. The Spaniard left due to a dispute regarding Night of the Eagles' post-production, and took with him the treatment of his next film Downtown Heat, which Marius claimed to have co-authored, leading to an unsuccessful lawsuit from the latter.

==== Refocus on sales and art films ====
Eurociné remained active but largely focused on sales. In the second half of the 1990s, they briefly dabbled with the new CD-ROM medium to peddle a few interactive adventures. Thanks to Daniel's mediation, the relationship with Franco was also mended around that time, and both camps plotted a remake of The Awful Dr. Orloff, which was to star Udo Kier. However, the adequate budget could not be raised. In 2001–03, a selection of the company's catalogue was re-issued on DVD by Image Entertainment in partnership with U.K. outfit Redemption Films, as part of Image's Euroshock Collection. Family patriarch Marius Lesoeur passed away in 2003.

Eurociné briefly returned to production in a minority partnership reminiscent of their beginnings, organizing the New York and Paris scenes of the 2004 Spanish-Colombian true crime film El Rey. Although well reviewed, it could not secure a release in France. It has also found a new niche in the international distribution of films from Central Europe, especially the Czech Republic where Daniel's wife Ilona Kunešová hails from. Most notably, the company oversaw the English-language adaptation of the acclaimed animated film Toys in the Attic, for which it enlisted the services of Vivian Schilling, John Cusack and Forest Whitaker.

In the mid 2000s, the company deposited a selection of its films in the collections of the French Cinematheque. Eurociné left their longtime Champs-Élysées offices in 2010. Directorial favorite Jesús Franco died in 2013. The original 1937 legal entity was wound up in 2015, but the Eurociné brand and library remained controlled by the Lesoeurs. Starting in 2020, Charles Band's Full Moon Features has reissued a selection of Eurociné's back catalogue on Blu-ray. These titles were later compiled in a Wizard Video-branded box set, commemorating the company's history with Band's old label.

== Production culture ==
=== Regulars ===
Eurociné's quick production schedules relied on a cast of regulars, which Daniel Lesoeur has dubbed "The Eurociné Family." This included actual relatives, who all worked multiple roles. Daniel's wife Ilona Kunešová was a script supervisor and occasional writer, and became the company's head of acquisitions after they refocused on sales. Their daughter Anouchka acted in several of their films as a child before, too, helping managing the company's catalogue. In the 1990s, their son Thomas joined the company's front office as well.

Howard Vernon, an alumn of several pre-Eurociné noirs produced by Lesoeur, is perhaps the actor most associated with the company thanks to his role as Franco's classic character Dr. Orloff. American Jack Taylor was signed to a salaried contract by the elder Lesoeur during the 1960s Western boom, which enabled him to get a Spanish work permit, a rare commodity under Franco. Lesoeur was also responsible for changing his early stage name Grek Martin to Jack Taylor. Supporting players included Frenchman Olivier Mathot and Spaniard Antonio Mayans, both character actors who had brushes with the mainstream, and a few Belgian transplants like Roger Darton and Pierre Taylou, who worked mostly as stage actors. Among the company's erotic starlets were Evelyne Scott, glamour model turned actress Alice Arno, former adult film performer Nadine Pascal and Monica Swinn (another Belgian who was brought to Eurociné by her boyfriend, underground film figure Jean-Pierre Bouyxou).

Jesús Franco was the company's emblematic director. He was introduced to Marius Lesoeur—right as he was starting to do business as Eurociné—by Sergio Newman, the Spanish-based producer of Queen of the Tabarin Club. While tempestuous, their on-and-off relationship spans every era of Eurociné, even after his death thanks to the Lesoeurs' collaboration to some posthumous projects. Due to their tortuous production history, the number of films credited to the partnership has varied, but Franco biographer Alain Petit pegs it as 28. Pierre Chevalier, a former director of popular comedies who revived his flagging career during Eurociné's sexploitation era, is the other director most often associated with Eurociné. In addition to many Spanish co-producers, the Lesoeurs frequently used Belgian father and son Jean and Pierre Quérut as international co-production partners, often through the company Brux International Pictures.

Alain Hardy was the Eurociné's longest tenured cinematographer. Gérard Brissaud was another company regular working for both Franco and Chevalier, although Franco biographer Stephen Thrower notes that the former sometimes used Brissaud's name as an alias to beef up the credits when photographing his own features. Jazz composer Daniel J. White, a Frenchman of Scottish descent, had also started working with Lesoeur during his pre-Eurociné noir days. About 80 percent of the company's posters were drawn by Ukrainian-born artist Constantin Belinsky, a fixture of the French B-movie industry.

=== Pseudonyms and figureheads ===
Eurociné is also known for its frequent use of pseudonyms, whose ownership is often debated due to the patchwork nature of many of their films. Marius Lesoeur started using the name A.L. Mariaux for some ancillary jobs in the late 40s, and was still credited as such at industry events in his twilight years. However, others such as Jesus Franco contributed to works credited to this name as well. The pseudonym A.M. Frank started as an aggregation of Marius Lesoeur's first and middle name initials (Adolphe Marius) and Jesus Franco's anglicized name. However it became a catch-all stage name as well, used on projects that did not involve Franco. A fake biography was even conjured, which claimed that it stood for Anton Martin Frank, itself a German alias for an American novelist called Robert Warren. H.L. Rostaine, who lent her name to some screenplays and contract signings, was Henriette Louise Rostaine, Marius' wife and Daniel's mother. Although used on several Alain Payet films and frequently associated with him, James Gartner was another company-wide alias. Henri Bral de Boitselier was an administrative employee of Belgian partners Brux International whose name was used to satisfy some co-production requirements. According to director Gilbert Roussel, Lesoeur likely felt that his upper class name added cachet to the credits.

Other regulars saw their names Americanized for similar reasons like Monika Swuine (Monica Swinn), Claude Boisson (who was renamed Yul Sanders by the elder Lesoeur as he was bald), Evelyne or Evelyn Scott (Evelyne Deher) Peter Knight (Pierre Chevalier) or Robert Foster (Antonio Mayans), not to be mistaken with American actor Robert Forster, who coincidentally also worked for Eurociné.

== Selected films produced ==
Year	Title	Notes^{[A]}
Films BAP (Charles Battesti and Robert Péguy)
1935	Monsieur Prosper	Short film
1935	Le Père La Cerise	Medium length film
1936	Jacques and Jacotte	Also known as Jacotte
1937	My Little Marquise	
1937	Monsieur Breloque Has Disappeared	
1938	Grandfather	
1946	Master Love	
Eurociné (Marius Lesoeur and family)
1960	Queen of the Tabarin Club	First collaboration between Marius Lesoeur and Jesus Franco; With Hispamer Films and Cifesa
1961	Interpol recherche...	With Urania Films
1961	Le Cave est piégé	With SOPADEC and Procinor
1961	The Awful Dr. Orloff	With Ydex and Hispamer Films
1962	Death Whistles the Blues	With Naga Films
1962	Zorro the Avenger	With Cooperativa Copercines
1963	Billy the Kid	With Tyris Film and Cooperativa Cinematográfica Carthago
1964	Tomb of the Pistolero	With Fenix-Films
1963	The Sadistic Baron von Klaus	With Cooperativa Cinematográfica Albatros
1964	The Shadow of Zorro	With Cooperativa Copercines and Produzioni Europee Associati
1965	Fall of the Mohicans	With Eguiluz Films and Ital Caribe Cinematografica
1967	Je suis une danseuse nue	With Lutétia Films; Short by Daniel Lesoeur released in nudie compilations La Grande parade du nu (1969) and Encore plus nu (1970)
1968	Nathalie, l'amour s'éveille	
1969	Paris inconnu	Mondo documentary
1970	Nathalie après l'amour	With Cetelci
1970	Caroline mannequin	Re-released as Caroline mannequin nu with scenes from Paris inconnu, The Awful Dr. Orloff and the Eurociné-distributed Sword of Zorro, which differed depending on copies
1971	Orloff and the Invisible Man	With Celia Films and Mezquiriz Producciones
1972	Red Hot Zorro	Also known as Zorro's Amorous Campaign; Composite of the Eurociné-distributed Sword of Zorro and new footage by Gilbert Roussel; With Brux International Pictures
1973	Pigalle carrefour des illusions	With Celia Films
1973	Avortement clandestin !	With Brux International Pictures
1973	Tender and Perverse Emmanuelle	Also known as The Last Thrill; With General Film
1973	Eugénie de Sade	With Prodif Établissements
1973	The Hot Nights of Linda	Also known as But Who Raped Linda? With Brux International Pictures and Parva Cinematografica
1973	Il torcinaso	With Exporama
1973	Kiss Me Killer	Remake of Death Sings the Blues; With Parva Cinematografica
1973	Crimson, the Color of Blood	Re-released with erotic inserts as Le Viol ou l'enfer des X With Mezquiriz Producciones and Europrodis
1973	The Girls of the Golden Saloon	Composite of the Eurociné-distributed The Sign of the Coyote with re-dubbed parodic dialogue and new footage by Gilbert Roussel; With C.A.C. and Brux International Pictures
1973	A Virgin Among the Living Dead	With Prodif Établissements and Brux Inter Films; It is debated whether the timing of Eurociné's involvement makes it a producer or distributor only. The Lesoeurs did commission Jean Rollin to shoot new zombie scenes in 1981.
1974	House of Cruel Dolls	Also known as House of Lost Dolls and Police Magnum 84; Composite of scenes from the Eurociné-distributed Agente Sigma 3 – Missione Goldwather and original footage by Pierre Chevalier; With C.R.C. Produzioni
1974	Convoy of Women	Composite of the Eurociné-distributed Hudson River Massacre and new footage by Pierre Chevalier; With Julia Film
1975	Devil's Kiss	With Andros Films
1975	The Mark of Zorro	Re-release of Zorro the Avenger with new framing scenes by Alain Payet
1975	A Virgin for Saint-Tropez	Also known as Love in the Mirror; With C.R.C. Produzioni
1975	Women Behind Bars	With Brux International Pictures
1976	Convoy of Girls	With Avia-Films; Re-released in 1979 as East of Berlin
1976	Paris porno	With Avia-Films
1975	Midnight Party	With Brux Inter Films
1975	Female Vampire	Also released in a horror version known as Erotikill, and with hardcore scenes as Les Avaleuses; With Les Films de Marc and Brux International Pictures
1975	Exorcism	Also released with pornographic scenes as Sexorcismes in 1975; Re-released with re-dubbed dialogue and new footage as The Sadist of Notre Dame in 1979; With Cetelsi (Exorcism) and Triton Cinematografica (The Sadist of Notre Dame)
1978	Shining Sex	With Brux International Film
1977	Helga, She-Wolf of Stilberg	With Les Films du Saphir
1977	Hitler's Last Train	Also known as Helltrain; With Plata Films
1977	Elsa Fräulein SS	Also known as Fräulein Devil and Fräulein Kitty; With Patrizia Cinematografica
1977	Golden Jail	Based on the canned film Razzia sur le plaisir (directed by Marius Lesoeur under Franco's guidance), re-edited with scenes from Pigalle carrefour des illusions, Paris porno, A Virgin for Saint-Tropez and Crimson; Re-released with hardcore inserts as Surboums Pornos
1978	Nathalie: Escape from Hell	With Les Films du Saphir
1978	Viol, la grande peur	
1979	Black Gold	Also known as Black Gold Dossier and Sabotage; With International Cine Holiday
1979	Jailhouse Wardress	Composite of Elite Films' Barbed Wire Dolls, ancillary footage from Elsa Fräulein SS and Hitler's Last Train, and new framing scenes by Alain Deruelle
1980	Mondo Cannibale	Also known as White Cannibal Queen; With Magna Films, Sirus International Films
1980	Cannibal Terror	Second film added to the Mondo Cannibale sessions to take advantage of locations
1980	Devil Hunter	With Lisa Film and J.E. Films
1980	La Pension des surdoués	Composite of Les Hommes de joie and new footage by Olivier Mathot
1981	Zombie Lake	With J.E. Films
1981	La Maison Tellier	With Laro Films
1981	Oasis of the Lost Girls	Also known as Police Destination Oasis; With J.E. Films
1982	Oasis of the Zombies	With Diasa Producciones Cinematograficas; Released in Spain with re-shot footage as La Tumba de los muertos vivientes
1982	Wild Things	Recycles footage from The Hot Nights of Linda; With Belfilm and Titanic Films
1982	Othello	With MB Diffusion; Also known as Black Commando
1983	Revenge in the House of Usher	Also known as Neurosis; With Elite Films (Spain)
1983	Diamonds of Kilimandjaro	With Elite Films (Spain)
1984	The Panther Squad	With Brux International Film, Greenwich International and R. Van Esbeeke European Film
1985	Sida, la peste del siglo XX	With Golden Films Internacional; Unreleased
1986	Golden Temple Amazons	With Brux International Pictures
1986	Angel of Death: Commando Mengele	Rework of the aborted Jesús Franco project Gente del Rio, re-shot from the ground up by Marius Lesoeur and Andrea Bianchi
1987	Maniac Killer	
1988	Dark Mission: Evil Flowers	With Siodmak Producciones
1987	Countdown to Esmeralda Bay	With Lluria Films
1989	Night of the Eagles	Also known as Fall of the Eagles; With Lluria Films
2004	El Rey	With Fundación Imagen Latina and Club de Tecnicas de Produccion; Nominated – Goya Award for Best Spanish Language Foreign Film
2013	La última película de Jess Franco	Documentary feature film With Vanglabeke Films and Pellicules et essai

^{A} Company information taken from the French Cinematography and Audiovisual Registry

== Legacy ==
Eurociné and Lesoeur's sister companies were also honored with a retrospective during the 2000 Brussels International Fantastic Film Festival. A feature-length documentary dedicated to the company entitled Eurociné, 33 Champs-Élysées, was released in 2013 in partnership with French TV channel Ciné+. Director Yann Gonzalez has named Eurociné as an influence on the erotic scenes found in his early works.
