= The Panther Squad =

1984 film by Pierre Chevalier

- Directed by: Pierre Chevalier
- Written by: Georges Friedland
- Produced by: Daniel Lesoeur
- Starring: Sybil Danning; Jack Taylor; Antonio Mayans; Karin Schubert; Donald O'Brien
- Cinematography: Phil Uyuer
- Edited by: Barry Lensky; Peter Marks
- Music by: Douglas Cooper Getschal; Jeffrey G. Gusman
- Production companies: Eurociné; European Film; Brux International Film; Greenwich International Film
- Distributed by: Eurociné (France); Lightning Video (U.S.)
- Release dates: 8 July 1986 (U.S.); 4 May 1988 (France)
- Running time: 83 minutes
- Countries: France; Belgium; Lichtenstein
- Language: English
- Budget: FF1.55 million

The Panther Squad is a 1984 French–Belgian–Liechtensteiner action comedy film directed by Pierre Chevalier and starring Sybil Danning, Jack Taylor, Antonio Mayans, Karin Schubert and Donald O'Brien. Danning plays the head of an all-girl commando unit pitted against green activists, who have been manipulated by a South American dictator into sabotaging an international space program.

The first feature made specifically for the Anglophone market by French production house Eurociné, it is indicative of the company's output in the early to mid 1980s, when it attempted to leave the budget-friendly confines of erotica and gothic horror to emulate more mainstream product. Although some elements are clearly intended as parody, the film has still received much criticism for its shoddiness.

== Cast ==
- Sybil Danning as Ilona / The Panther
- Jack Taylor as Frank Bramble
- Karin Schubert as Barbara
- Antonio Mayans as General Carlos
- Jean-René Gossart as Clean Space Leader
- Donald O'Brien as General de Boele
- Arch Taylor as U.N. Secretary-General
- Roger Darton as Barrault
- John Rounds as Nelson
- Shirley Knight as Manuela

Françoise Bocci, Donna Cross, Karin Brussels, Analía Ivars and Virginia Svenson appear as Panther Squad members. Lone Fleming and de:Katja Bienert appear in cameos.

== Production ==
=== Development ===
When he was introduced to U.S.-based Austrian actress Sybil Danning, Daniel Lesoeur a.k.a. Dan Simon, producer and director of foreign sales for his father Marius' Eurociné company, saw in her the marquee name that could open doors to key markets, particularly Anglo-Saxon ones which had proven averse to his typically European brand of post-synchronized B-movies. Part of the mutually beneficial arrangement was a co-producer credit for Danning, which she and manager S.C. Dacy desired as it would lend credibility to their ongoing efforts to branch out into production. Irish supporting actor Donald O'Brien was only returning to acting after a lengthy period of semi-retirement. While frequent Eurociné associates Brux Inter Film of Belgium are listed as copyright holders, this was considered a majority French production.

The project was announced as The Panther, but the title was changed to Panther Squad before filming. Although the narrative pitch was credited to one Ilona Koch, after whom the main character was also named, this was merely an alias for Daniel Lesoeur's domestic partner, Ilona Kunesova, who performed a variety of duties for the family-owned Eurociné. Danning argued that pictures like Panther Squad echoed the emergence of a new generation of strong real-life women, including astronaut Sally Ride. S.C. Dacy was credited as special consultant and rewrote a few lines of the script. Although some fan discussions have surmised that Eurociné regular Jesús Franco contributed to the production, Danning saw no sign of his involvement whatsoever.

The film was originally supposed to be helmed by Alain Payet. However, one week before cameras were set to roll, casting was still not complete, and several accessories mentioned in the script had not yet been procured, such as the flame-throwing blow dry used by one of the agents. Feeling unsupported, Payet demanded that the Lesoeurs hire a prop master to iron out the final details, but they refused. Fearing that his bosses may blame him for the consequences of their own shortcomings, as they had done in the past, Payet quit and was replaced by another Eurociné regular, Pierre Chevalier.

=== Filming ===
Pre-production documents stated that photography was to start in May 1984 and last at least four weeks at a budget of FF1.55 million. Most of it took place in the province of Alicante in Spain, which stood in for the fictional nation of Guasura, while additional scenes were shot in Belgium. Daniel Lesoeur went through a scare when Karin Schubert, who had a four-day break in her schedule, left for her native Germany without informing the crew, sparking fears that she had bailed out on him. However, she came back in time for her next scenes at the start of the following week. Although the film was geared towards a U.S. audience, parts of it still ended up being dubbed, to varying degrees of appreciation.

True to Eurociné's reputation, The Panther Squad boasted frugal production values. The tricks employed to set scenes at U.N. facilities in New York, such as a wallpaper of Manhattan's cityscape placed behind a window, failed to convince. During the attack on the villain's personal guard, there were not enough military shoes to outfit all participants, and some of them had to keep their sneakers on. To make light of the situation, Dacy changed Danning's dialogue in that scene from "Don't move or I'll blow your heads off!" to "Don't move or I'll blow your Nikes off!", a line that was singled out by a critic for its lameness. The laser superweapon wielded by the heroine in the climax is easily identifiable as an almost stock ZX 271, a mass market toy gun manufactured by Edison Giocattoli.

The science-fiction angle also relied heavily on recycled footage. Although it was only connected to the film by a few stock shots of the Ariane satellite launcher, Aerospatiale was prominently thanked for its collaboration in the French credits, which was derided as a desultory attempt to acquire some cachet by namedropping a high tech company. The "Space Jeep" shuttles, as seen in flight, are represented by clips of two ships from the Japanese Message from Space franchise, which do not match the scale of the real-life rocket seen in earlier scenes.

== Release ==
=== Theatrical ===
The film's U.S. rights were originally purchased by the soon-to-be-bankrupt Film Ventures International, who apparently intended to retain the early title of The Panther. As a result, there is no indication that it opened theatrically in the country. In France, the film only received a belated and sporadic release which, as with many works of this caliber, eschewed Paris where screens were harder to come by. The domestic opening date is listed as 4 May 1988. The domestic trailer emphatically proclaimed: "If you like James Bond, if you admire Belmondo, you will love... Panther Squad!"

=== Home media ===
In several major territories, the film's video rights were acquired by Vestron. In the U.S., it arrived on VHS and Betamax on 8 July 1986, via their subsidiary Lightning Video. In France, the film was not seen until more than four years later, through Delta Video.

On 15 January 2020, Charles Band's Full Moon Features re-released The Panther Squad on Blu-ray in partnership with Band's own magazine Delirium. Chris Alexander, the publication's editor, moderated a feature-length commentary with Danning for inclusion on the disc, and the film was the cover story of its coinciding issue.

== Reception ==
The Panther Squad was universally panned by critics. In the U.S., Variety reviewer Lor. wrote that it was "bound to be a disappointment for Sybil Danning fans" as "the action scenes are poorly photographed and edited", while, "in stepping into a co-producer role in addition to starring, the statuesque actress has deleted the sexy elements of her earlier work." John Stanley, author of the Creature Features series of books, called it a "[s]ubstandard action flick". He too noted that Danning "doesn't give us a modicum of titillation [...] Her fans will weep as they dream of her lavish figure hidden beneath the fatigues, and will cry additional tears about how poorly this was directed by Peter Knight." TV Guide lambasted the production's thriftiness, writing that it "look[ed] 10 years older than it is", as "the color is washed out" and "the sound is wretched". Genre critic Joe Kane found that Danning "endangers her hard-won standing as a quality B-movie icon not only by starring in but by co-producing this pathetic, spliced together mess. Panther Squad is limp on every level, from its weak thesping and amateurishly staged 'action' sequences to its lame script and stiff direction." Comparing it with other girls-with-guns flicks such as Hustler Squad, Angel's Brigade, and The Hellcats, author Michael Adams found that "[w]orse than them all, by magnitude is Panther Squad [...] Grainy, dubbed, mind-bogglingly stupid, it has to be one of the most actionless action movies ever conceived. Even fans of scantily clad women firing guns should go to the grave without seeing this". In his Horror and Science Fiction Films compendium, Donald C. Willis deemed that this "[g]lib, tacky, no-style femme-jock material makes weak vehicle for Danning’s physical attributes." In a profile of co-star Jack Taylor, film historian Michael R. Pitt further called the film a "tattered actioner".

Domestic reception was equally unfavorable. Marcel Burel of French action film magazine Impact found that The Panther Squad "piles on risible dialogue, sloppy and plodding fights, lame supporting characters, shabby locations, antediluvian clichés, and old stock shots". He recommended it to those with a penchant for "definitive lameness". In a Sybil Danning career issue, enthusiast publication Ciné Zine Zone dismissed it as an effort that "beggars belief" and represents "the pits" of the actress' filmography.

== Soundtrack ==
Danning claims that she was responsible for reaching out to Gino Vannelli, of which she was a fan, to do the film's title song. Gino turned down the offer to perform, but still arranged for his brother and frequent collaborator Ross to pen something for her. The resulting track, "Tough and Tender", was sung by session musician Steve Stone, best known for his brief stint with Dream Theater a few years later. Danning cites her and her agent Kenneth Johnston's efforts to get the song made as the primary justification for their respective co-producer credits.

== Related works ==
Sybil Danning later joined a similar project, Commando Squad, for Trans World Entertainment, but resigned after the company reduced her role to make room for their new contract star, Playboy Playmate of the Year Kathy Shower.
