= Oasis of the Zombies =

1982 film by Jesús Franco

- French theatrical release poster
- Directed by: Jesús Franco (as A.M. Frank)
- Written by: Marius Lesoeur
- Produced by: Marius Lesoeur
- Starring: Manuel Gélin; France Lomay
- Cinematography: Max Monteillet
- Edited by: Claude Gros; Jesús Franco
- Music by: Daniel White; Jesús Franco
- Production companies: Eurociné; Diasa P.C. (Spanish version); Marte Films (Spanish version)
- Distributed by: Eurociné (France); Marte Films (Spain)
- Release dates: 21 April 1982 (France); 1 March 1983 (Spain)
- Running time: 83 minutes (France); 87 minutes (Spain)
- Countries: France; Spain (Spanish version)
- Languages: French; Spanish

Oasis of the Zombies (French: L'Abîme des morts-vivants, lit. 'Abyss of the Living Dead') is a 1982 French horror film written and directed by Jesús Franco, starring fr:Manuel Gélin and France Lomay. In it, a young man (Gélin) goes after the fortune seekers who killed his father in search of Nazi gold buried in the Libyan Desert, and discovers that it is still guarded by zombified Afrika Korps soldiers. A second version, titled La tumba de los muertos vivientes (lit. 'Grave of the Living Dead'), was released the following year in Spain, for which alternate footage was shot.

== Cast ==
- Manuel Gélin as Robert Blabert
- France Lomay as Erika
- Jeff Montgomery as Ben
- Eric Saint-Just as Ronald
- Caroline Audret as Sylvie
- Henri Lambert (French version) / Eduardo Fajardo (Spanish version)
  as Kurt Meitzell
- Myriam Landson (French version) / Lina Romay (Spanish version)
  as Kurt's Wife
- Antonio Mayans as Sheik Mohamed Al-Kafir
- Javier Maiza as Captain Blabert
- Albino Graziani as Professor Deniken
- Miguel Ángel Aristu as Ahmed
- Doris Regina as Aisha

== Production ==
=== Development ===
Oasis of the Zombies was meant to expand on the concept of 1981's Zombie Lake, which had done well for production company Eurociné. Jesús Franco was supposed to direct Zombie Lake but quit after the project was scaled back, reconciled with Eurociné boss Marius Lesoeur and his son Daniel, and embarked on the new film. Like its predecessor, Oasis was made to capitalize on the zombie trend which followed the success of George Romero's Dawn of the Dead. The Spanish helmer did not think much of Romero as a director, nor did he have any interest in zombies, as he found them inexpressive and non-threatening. However, he convinced himself to do it due to the adventure aspects of the hunt for Nazi gold.

As the Lesoeurs were friends with a Moroccan distributor, whose country offered landscapes that could pass for the story setting of Cyrenaica, they invited Franco to go there on a scouting trip. However, the director was disappointed by the locations found for him near the big coastal cities, and pushed to visit further down south. When they reached the region of Tindouf, he finally found the vistas he had imagined. When their local partner informed them that this was contested territory, and they might get extorted by the Polisario Front, Marius Lesoeur immediately nixed the location. As a fallback option, Franco told the producer that the island of Gran Canaria possessed a desert which, while small, could suffice for the film and was easily accessible from the Spanish mainland. Moreover, it had a population of camels. This was approved.

=== Filming ===
Filming took place around December 1981. After principal photography in Spain, a few interiors were shot in Paris. The production title was Le Trésor des morts-vivants ('Treasure of the Living Dead'). The actors were asked to recite their dialogue in English during the shoot to facilitate a U.S. version. This was a particular problem for French actor Henri Lambert, who had no command of the language whatsoever, but soldiered on with professionalism. Some sources state that Franco has a cameo as one of the zombies. The director told French magazine Mad Movies that while he hardly ever loved his work, he was mostly satisfied with what he had achieved on the film, calling it "not bad".

==== Special effects ====
In addition to a French and a Spanish effects artist, Daniel Lesoeur personally oversaw the zombie prosthetics. Franco felt that the younger Lesoeur could have turned this talent into a career if it wasn't for his duties as a producer. The director initially thought that the circle of fire lit up during the finale should be more spectacular, but the director accepted that it be scaled down to convey that it was the circle's magic powers, rather than the flames' heat, that repelled the living dead. As often with Eurociné, the film makes extensive use of stock footage: the World War II combat scenes were lifted from the 1971 Italian feature Heroes Without Glory.

==== Spanish version ====
Two versions of the film were produced: one for the French and international markets, and another for the Spanish market. The Spanish cut replaces original actors Henri Lambert and Myriam Landson with Franco regulars Lina Romay and Eduardo Fajardo, and is tweaked in several parts to accommodate the new footage. Rather than the mix of library music and original ambient cues from French composer Daniel J. White, it features a different score cobbled from tracks composed by Franco himself for previous projects. Although it has often been speculated that both versions were made concurrently, Franco biographer Stephen Thrower writes that the alternate Spanish footage was shot after completion of the French film. This is corroborated by a CNC registry which, unlike Zombie Lake, does not classify it as a Spanish co-production. According to Thrower, Eurociné struck a belated deal with Spanish producer Arturo Marcos Tejedor for his home market, and the new footage was commissioned to qualify for Spanish tax relief. He presents circumstantial evidence that it was shot nearly one year after principal photography during filming of Franco's Diamonds of the Kilimandjaro, which also took place in Gran Canaria.

== Release ==
=== Theatrical ===
Like most Eurociné films, Oasis of the Zombies was sparsely distributed, even in France. It debuted in the provinces on 21 April 1982, and did not appear in Paris until 18 March 1987 for an exclusive engagement at exploitation theater fr:Le Brady. In Spain, the film was distributed by Marte Films Internacional and drew a modest 37,530 admissions. Several domestic resources quote a 1 March 1983 release date, although this is not corroborated by major newspapers of the day. Some publications indicate that the film was also known in Spain as El desierto de los zombies.

=== Television ===
In the U.S., the video release was preceded by a few broadcasts on independent TV channels. The earliest that could be sourced at this time came on Nashville's Channel 30 on 13 July 1984. The film was sold as part of the Shock Around the Clock syndication package offered by Cinema Shares International, alongside two more Eurociné products, Zombie Lake and Orloff Against the Invisible Man.

=== Home media ===
In France, the film was released on VHS by Les Productions du Tigre around July 1983. In Spain, it was published by Video Fan and received its release certificate in December 1983. In the U.S., it was distributed by Charles Band's Wizard Video, which released it on VHS and Betamax in January 1986. A re-issue by Taurus Films changed the title to Bloodsucking Nazi Zombies. American exploitation director Fred Olen Ray, who also dabbled in film sales, recalled inquiring about the rights to Oasis of the Zombies and its predecessor Zombie Lake at the 1984 AFM, but arriving too late. Wizard's big box VHS was part of the first batch in a series of limited edition reprints by Band's successor company Full Moon, which began in February 2013.

The film received en English language DVD from U.S. distributor Image Entertainment in Mars 2001. A French DVD followed in October 2007 from magazine Mad Movies. The Spanish version was re-issued on DVD by Ediciones Divisa in January 2003. The film made its Blu-ray debut through U.S. distributor Kino Lorber in February 2013.

== Reception ==
Oasis of the Zombies has received overwhelmingly negative reviews. In France, Pierre Gires of L'Écran fantastique wrote that this "ultra cheap production, as poorly acted as it is photographed (and let's not even talk about the direction if you can call it that), tries to intrigue, then to scare, but only manages to bore." Writing in Mad Movies, Jean-Pierre Putters wrote that he was not sure whether the film had indeed been directed by Franco due to Eurociné's liberal use of pseudonyms, but "some out of focus zooms definitely settled the question." He added that "[t]he film has been directed with modest means". Of the narrative, he wrote: "The screenplay... What screenplay?" However, he still found it less appalling than Eurociné's own Cannibal Terror.

David Bianculli of The Philadelphia Inquirer wrote that "[o]utside of Night of the Comet, you won't find many zombie movies made in the '80s. This 1981 effort is one reason why you may not want to search for any." British magazine Video World noted that "[t]his boring, ineffectual Jess Franco clunker was also released as Bloodsucking Nazi Zombies, but under any title it's a real stinker." Author Scott Aaron Stine concurred and noted that "the gore amounts to little more than smeared blood, although there is one obligatory gut-munching scene depicting desperate actors chewing on butcher shop leftovers." 1989's The Deep Red Horror Book, a spinoff of the eponymous magazine, called it "the world's worst walking dead film."

Tim Lucas of Video Watchdog deemed the film "slow, but much better than Eurociné's Zombie Lake." Writing in The Zombie Movie Encyclopedia, academic Peter Dendle stated that "presents a simple, unhurried, and unpretending appreciation of zombies and their habitat, a fresh and provocative desert landscape." Ian Jane of DVD Talk rated it 3 out of 5 and wrote, "It's terrible, but somehow trance inducing in its own bizarre way." Gordon Sullivan of DVD Verdict wrote, "It's really a mess of tepid Eurosleaze masquerading as a zombie flick, and it doesn't even do that well."

=== Video Nasty listing ===
Although largely devoid of graphic content, Oasis of the Zombies was put on Section 3 of the Director of Public Prosecutions's Video Nasties list, which meant that, while not considered extreme enough to warrant a conviction in the English and Welsh High Court of Justice, any copy could still be confiscated and destroyed by authorities.

== Follow-up ==
The following year, Franco directed another living dead film in Gran Canaria, Mansion of the Living Dead, for Spanish company Golden Films.

== Bibliography ==
- Thrower, Stephen; Grainger, Julian (2018). Flowers of Perversion: The Delirious Cinema of Jesús Franco. Vol. 2: 1975–2013. London: Strange Attractor Press. ISBN 9781907222603.
