= Zombie Lake =

1981 film by Jean Rollin

- French theatrical poster
- Directed by: Jean Rollin; Julian de Laserna
- Written by: Julián Esteban; Marius Lesoeur
- Produced by: Daniel Lesoeur
- Starring: Howard Vernon; Pierre-Marie Escourrou; Anouchka Lesoeur; Nadine Pascal
- Cinematography: Max Monteillet
- Edited by: Claude Gros (French version); María Luisa Soriano (Spanish version)
- Music by: Daniel White
- Production companies: J.E. Films; Eurociné
- Distributed by: Eurociné
- Release date: 13 May 1981 (France)
- Running time: 90 minutes
- Countries: France; Spain
- Language: French

Zombie Lake (French: Le lac des morts vivants; Spanish: El lago de los muertos vivientes) is a 1981 French–Spanish horror film directed by Jean Rollin and starring Howard Vernon, Pierre-Marie Escourrou, Anouchka Lesoeur and Nadine Pascal. Vernon plays the mayor of a small French town under attack from Nazi zombies who were killed by locals twenty years earlier. It received marginal praise for an unusual angle involving a little girl and her zombie father, but was otherwise lambasted for its production values, and became emblematic of exploitation house Eurociné's output.

== Plot ==
The story opens in a small French village 20 years after World War II. The villagers refer to a small nearby lake known as the "lake of the damned." A group of young women go skinnydipping in the lake and are attacked by zombie Nazi soldiers who drown them. The zombies later leave the lake and attack women within the town. The mayor of the town refuses to take action against the zombie attacks until reporter Katya Moore arrives to investigate.

After Moore returns a book to the mayor, they discuss the history of the town during the German occupation. His story is about a young Nazi soldier who protected a local woman from enemy gunfire. He was nursed back to health by the woman, who offered him her pendant and had sex with him. Returning to the woman later, the soldier found her dying after giving birth to their daughter Helena. The soldier and his entire platoon were then murdered by a group of townspeople led by the mayor, and their bodies disposed of in the lake.

The mayor says that he believes the zombies are the soldiers returning from the dead. Later, a female basketball team visiting the town is attacked by the zombies. Given the scale of the tragedy, the mayor calls the police, who send two detectives over to investigate. They too are killed by the zombies. The mayor then devises a plan to use the zombie's relationship with Helena by having her lure them into a mill. The zombies enter the mill, which is then destroyed by the villagers using flamethrowers.

== Cast ==
- Howard Vernon as The Mayor
- Marcia Sharif as Katya Moore
- Pierre-Marie Escourrou as German Soldier
- Anouchka as Helena
- Nadine Pascal as Helena's Mother
- Youri Radionow as Chanac
- Bertrand "Burt" Altmann as Inspector Morane
- Jean Rollin as Inspector Spitz
- Gilda Arancio as Blonde Girl Swimmer
- Antonio Mayans as One-Eyed Zombie

== Production ==
=== Development ===
Zombie Lake was Eurociné's take on the popular "living dead" films of the time. Although it has been compared to Shock Waves, company heir Daniel Lesoeur stated that the lake setting was chosen because it evoked the holidays and contrasted with the film's horror themes. It was initially going to be directed by Jesus Franco. Pre-production documents list a provisional budget of FF1.4 million, or about $340,000, similar to many B-movies at the time. Franco had set his sights on a majestic valley in Switzerland, but as the shoot grew nearer, Eurociné boss Marius Lesoeur balked at the expenses incurred by such a location and started trimming the budget. A displeased Franco abruptly cut contact with the company.

As the film was a co-production between France and Spain, it had to be directed by a Spaniard. A replacement by the name of Atienza was briefly considered, but he was out of his depth with this genre. Marius then reached out to Jean Rollin, based on his experience with undead films. Rollin got the call on a Friday afternoon and started the next Monday, after cancelling a trip as a favor to the Lesoeurs. However, Zombie Lake was credited to J.A. Lazer, an anglicized alias for Spanish crew member Julian de Laserna.

=== Filming ===
Rollin completed the film in three weeks. According to the Frenchman, de Laserna was only present on set for a couple of days, and did not contribute to the direction. Other sources state that de Laserna directed select scenes under Rollin's supervision. The shoot was hampered by the Lesoeurs' secretive habits. There was only one copy of the screenplay, and Daniel refused to have others made. As a result, Rollin spent his first days being shuttled between locations and shooting scenes on the producer's orders without knowing the full story. After a few days, Rollin protested and was finally given the script.

Exteriors were primarily captured north of Paris, in the forest of Senlis. Most interior filming took place in the southeastern suburb of Villeneuve-Saint-Georges. Location scouting was severely lacking. The World War II shootout was staged at a public square called Place de la Libération, a name that celebrated the end of the conflict. Public signage bearing the name had to be crudely obscured with chalk at the last minute. Another scene was supposed to show the zombies rampaging through an orchard. When Rollin asked to see the place, he was told that nobody had scouted for it. The director just tore up the corresponding pages from the screenplay and moved on.

Equipment was also limited. A single, ancient spotlight was available for the nighttime zombie attack and Daniel Lesoeur, who filled many roles on set, was electrocuted when he tried moving it around. An oft repeated anecdote has it that a camera became stuck in undercrank mode and Marius Lesoeur ordered the actors to move slower until it could be fixed, so that their speed would look right at a normal framerate. Daniel Lesoeur has confirmed that something similar happened, although not necessarily on this film. According to Rollin, veteran makeup artist Christiane Sauvage did a decent job on the zombies in early scenes, but she lost motivation after witnessing the production's overall shoddiness and thereafter stuck to applying a basic coat of body paint.

=== Post-production ===
As usual for Eurociné, the war scenes recycled footage from the company's catalogue, in this case Helltrain and East of Berlin. Perhaps to satisfy co-production regulations, Claude Gros was credited as the editor for the French and international versions, while María Luisa Soriano received credit for the Spanish version.

== Release ==
=== Theatrical ===
Zombie Lake opened in France on 13 May 1981 through Eurociné. The film drew 186,680 admissions in the country, a modest score but a solid one for a small independent like Eurociné. According Daniel Lesoeur, the film was one of the company's most commercially successful. In Spain, government archives only credit the film with a belated 17 December 1987 release visa (possibly a typo for 1981), which resulted in a paltry 35,130 admissions.

=== Television ===
In the U.S., the video release was preceded by a few broadcasts on independent TV channels. The earliest on record came on Detroit's Channel 20 on 26 January 1985. The film was sold as part of the Shock Around the Clock syndication package offered by Cinema Shares International, alongside two more Eurociné products, Oasis of the Zombies and Orloff Against the Invisible Man. Eurociné originally marketed the film in English as Zombie's Lake.

=== Home media ===
In the U.S., the film was distributed by Charles Band's Wizard Video, who released it on VHS and Betamax on 5 July 1985. American exploitation director Fred Olen Ray, who also dabbled in film sales, recalled inquiring about the rights to Zombie Lake and its successor Oasis of the Zombies at the 1984 AFM, but arriving too late. A French tape, also released in the VHS and Betamax formats, was part of a series of Eurociné releases dated 1981 from publisher Cine 7. In Spain, the film was released on VHS by IVS/Video Service. The tape was approved for release on 1 June 1982.

The film was re-issued on DVD by U.S. company Image Entertainment, under their Euro Shock imprint, on 27 March 2001. It came to Blu-ray courtesy of Redemption, a sublabel of U.S. outfit Kino Lorber, on 26 February 2013.

== Reception ==
In a contemporary review, French magazine L'Écran fantastique mocked various goofs, basic makeup, and acts of flesh eating that looked more like vampire bites. It summed up Zombie Lake as a "sham" and claimed that Jean Rollin had "given credence to those who claim that he is not a shining beacon of cinema." Tim Lucas of Video Watchdog called it "an undeniably sloppy film", criticizing the poor make-up, score and acting from Anoushka Lesoeur. Glenn Kay, author of Zombie Movies: The Ultimate Guide, also criticized the acting and make-up, adding that "the sound mix is one of the worst recorded for a feature film." VideoHound's Golden Movie Retriever derided the "laughable effects" and a film that was "almost bad enough to be good." Adam Tyner of DVD Talk described it as "pretty much unwatchable." Robert Firsching of AllMovie found that "those looking for a better treatment of the same plot should consider Ken Wiederhorn's Shock Waves instead."

Some reviewers noted the film's poetic touches, although few found them redeeming enough. In French magazine Vendredi 13, Norbert Moutier—himself known for his thrifty horror films—wrote that while it was obvious that Rollin was "working on someone's orders" and with a "paltry budget", the film remained "endearing." PopMatters assessed that, "although less interesting than his other zombie movies (e.g. The Living Dead Girl, The Grapes of Death), [it] manages to be another of his elegiac sonnets about yearning for death and the love that transcends it." Gordon Sullivan of DVD Verdict wrote that it had "that strange Jean Rollin touch to recommend it," but in a standard zombie vehicle, "the slowness of the narrative feels like it's fighting the tension generated by the walking dead." Bloody Disgusting acknowledged that the film possessed a "distinctive vibe [that] could’ve originated from Rollin’s own style, but it feels more like he just had no clue how to make a zombie movie." Peter Dendle, author of The Zombie Movie Encyclopedia, interpreted those elements as "a biting satire of sentimental movies", but still deemed it a "mediocre horror piece."

== Soundtrack ==
The film's score was composed by Daniel White, although not all of it was original. It was issued on limited edition CD and LP by French label Specific Bis in 2017. Video Watchdog's Tim Lucas wrote that it was "taken from at least four other movies." The CD's liner notes actually credit three tracks recycled from White's pre-existing library.

== Follow-up ==
Franco reconciled with the Lesoeurs shortly after the making of this film, and was convinced to direct a new version of the same story, this time set in a desert and called Oasis of the Zombies. The producers also commissioned Rollin to shoot inserts for Franco's A Virgin Among the Living Dead, in order to repackage it as a zombie movie rather than the gothic horror film it actually was.

== See also ==
- List of horror films of 1981
