= Golden Temple Amazons =

- Poster
- French: Les Amazones du temple d'or
- Spanish: Tundra y el templo del sol
- Directed by: Alain Payet; Jesús Franco
- Written by: Georges Friedland; Jesús Franco
- Produced by: Marius Lesoeur; Daniel-Simon Lesoeur; Georges Friedland; Jesús Franco; Pierre Querut
- Starring: Analía Ivars; William Berger
- Cinematography: Henry Frogers
- Edited by: Lina Lore
- Music by: Norbert Verrone
- Production companies: Eurociné; Brux International Pictures
- Release date: 1986
- Running time: 86 minutes
- Countries: France, Belgium, Spain
- Language: French

Golden Temple Amazons (French: Les Amazones du temple d'or; Spanish: Tundra y el templo del sol) is a 1986 French–Belgian–Spanish erotic adventure film directed by Alain Payet and Jesús Franco. It stars Analía Ivars (credited as Joan Virly) and William Berger.

== Cast ==
- Analía Ivars as Liana Simpson (credited as Joan Virly)
- William Berger as Uruck, the temple guard / priest
- Antonio Mayans as Bud, jungle guide (credited as Robert Foster)
- Stanley Kapoul as Koukou the shaman (credited as Stanley Capoul)
- Françoise Blanchard as Blonde Amazon
- Jean-René Gossart as Mr. Simpson
- Olivier Mathot as Father Johnstone, the Simpsons' friend (credited as Oliver Matthew)
- Eva León as Rena, Amazon leader (uncredited)
- Lina Romay as Amazon guard (uncredited)
- Emilio Linder as Harvey the archaeologist (uncredited)
- Alicia Príncipe as Bella, Harvey’s wife (uncredited)
- Rocky the monkey as himself
- Claude Marchal
- Jean-Claude Lerner

== Production ==
The film was produced by Eurociné and Brux International Pictures. It was shot in color using a 1.66:1 aspect ratio on 35 mm film, and features monaural sound. It is predominantly in French, although it was co-produced by companies from France, Belgium, and Spain.

== Reception ==
The film has gained notoriety for its unintentionally humorous tone and absurd elements. The cult film website Nanarland wrote:

From the first to the last image, Les Amazones du temple d'or crumbles under intense ridicule. Shot in 1986 during the boom of epic adventure films, the work seems to reflect a total lack of awareness by its creators and financiers, who we struggle to believe seriously entertained the viability of such a project. Even in the 1980s, the film would have seemed ridiculous by the standards of the Comtesse Hachisch.
