= Mondo Cannibale =

1980 Spanish-Italian cannibal exploitation film

- Original release poster
- Directed by: Jesús Franco
- Written by: Jesús Franco
- Produced by: Daniel Lesoeur; Marius Lesoeur; Franco Prosperi
- Starring: Al Cliver; Sabrina Siani; Olivier Mathot; Pamlea Stanford
- Cinematography: Luis Colombo; Juan Soler
- Edited by: Roland Grillon; Antonio Hermand
- Music by: Roberto Pregadio
- Production companies: Eurociné; Eurofilms
- Distributed by: Atlas Films SPRL-PVBA
- Release date: 15 September 1980 (Italy)
- Running time: 90 minutes
- Countries: Spain; Italy
- Languages: Italian; English

Mondo Cannibale (English: Cannibal World; also known as The Cannibals – or simply Cannibals –, Die Blonde Göttin, White Cannibal Queen, A Woman for the Cannibals and Barbarian Goddess) is a 1980 Spanish-Italian cannibal exploitation film directed by Jesús Franco and stars Al Cliver and a then-17 year old Sabrina Siani. It is one of two cannibal films directed by Franco starring Cliver, the other being Devil Hunter.

Franco's original shooting title was Rio Salvaje, but it was changed to Mondo Cannibale before its release. While not prosecuted for obscenity, the film was seized and confiscated in the UK under Section 3 of the Obscene Publications Act 1959 during the video nasty panic.

== Premise ==
Jeremy Taylor is traveling through the Amazon rivers along with his wife and daughter when his boat gets attacked by some Indigenous cannibals who eat his wife Elisabeth and take Jeremy prisoner. The little girl Léna manages to hide inside the boat, even though the cannibal witch doctor and his son Yakeké find her fainted on the side of a river and carry her to the village, where she gets worshipped as the "white goddess."

After having suffered an arm amputation, Jeremy flees from the cannibal tribe and, rescued, manages to return to New York. His recovery, both physical and psychological, is still slow. Ana's presence is decisive; the doctor who, after having cured him with love, gets engaged to him. But Jeremy is obsessed with retrieving his daughter, who he believes of seeing reflected images on the shop window. Thus, after 10 years, he manages to organise a new expedition in the cannibals' land, financed by a billionaire lover of adventure, Charles Fenton, and his partner Barbara Shelton.

During the journey, the members of the expedition get killed one after the other by the natives hidden within the vegetation. Only Jeremy, Ana, and a young photographer reach the village, but as prisoners, the doctor gets immediately eaten by the cannibals.

Léna, who has grown and has married Yakaké, the witch doctor's son, seems unable to recognise her father, but when she learns the day after tomorrow that the two men will be sacrificed, she decides to free them at nighttime. Jeremy begs her to return to the United States with him, but Léna does not want to leave those who are by now her place and her people.

Jeremy returns to the village on the way back to expend his resources. He sneaks into the tent of Léna and takes hold of her. Whilst he is leaving the village, he still gets found by Yakaké, who, in the river, in front of the mayhem of the natives, faces up in a rustic duel before the photographer, defeating him, and then Jeremy himself, who manages to have the upper hand despite his amputated arm.

While Yakaké does his usual salute to his "White goddess", Jeremy and his daughter return to civilisation.

== Cast ==
- Sabrina Siani as Lana
  - Anouska as Young Lana
- Al Cliver as Jeremy Taylor
- Oliver Mathot as Charles Fenton
- Antonio Mayans as Yakaké
- Lina Romay as Ana
- Jesús Franco as Mr. Martin (uncredited cameo)

== Production ==
Franco said in the interview that he only did the two cannibal films (this one and Cannibal Terror) for the money, and said that he had no idea why anyone would want to watch such films. He said that Sabrina Siani was the worst actress that he ever worked with in his life (second only to Romina Power) and that Siani's only good quality was her "delectable derrière" (lit. "delectable behind").

== Release ==
The film was theatrically released in France on October 21, 1981.

Blue Underground released a DVD version on November 13, 2007.

== Reception ==
Ian Jane from DVD Talk awarded the film 1.5 out of 5 stars, criticizing the film for its poor acting, ineffective special effects, screenplay, music score, and editing. However, Jane went on to state "there's a strange manic energy to the picture that makes it a lot of fun to watch."

Nanarland found that "The pace of the film, deliberately slow, can provoke boredom if the spectator is ill-disposed, but the pretension which underlies this “disturbing” atmosphere contributes to the general comical effect of the production."

Another commentator described the film as "Without the tight compositions, dizzy visuals, and strategically placed reverb" that generally characterise Franco's work, "Cannibals is just another cheap Cannibal Ferox rip-off with savages in flip-flops .."
