= The Awful Dr. Orloff =

1962 film

- Spanish theatrical release poster
- Spanish: Gritos en la noche
- Directed by: Jesús Franco
- Written by: Jesús Franco
- Produced by: Leo Lax; Marius Lesœur; Sergio Newman
- Starring: Howard Vernon; Conrado San Martín; Diana Lorys; Ricardo Valle; María Silva; Perla Cristal
- Cinematography: Godofredo Pacheco
- Edited by: Alfonso Santacana
- Music by: Jose Pagan; Antonio Ramírez Ángel
- Production companies: Hispamer Film; Plaza Films Intl.; Eurociné; Leo Lax Production
- Distributed by: Delta Films (Spain)
- Release dates: 9 March 1962 (Barcelona premiere); 14 May 1962 (Spain); 22 May 1963 (France)
- Running time: 93 minutes
- Countries: Spain; France
- Language: Spanish

The Awful Dr. Orloff (Spanish: Gritos en la noche, lit. 'Screams in the Night'; French: L'Horrible Docteur Orloff) is a 1962 horror film written and directed by Jesús Franco. It stars Howard Vernon as the mad Dr. Orloff (sometimes spelled Orlof) who wants to repair his disfigured daughter's face with skin grafts from other women with the aid of a slavish, blind henchman named Morpho. A co-production between Spain and France, filmed in Madrid, the film is considered to be the earliest Spanish horror film.

The Awful Dr. Orloff was the first horror film directed by cult filmmaker Franco, and the first of many subsequent collaborations with Howard Vernon. Franco would reuse the Orloff and Morpho characters in many of his later horror films, such as Vampyros Lesbos, Revenge in the House of Usher, and Faceless.

== Plot ==
In early 1900s Paris, Police Inspector Tanner inspects a series of abductions of beautiful women from nightclubs. The perpetrator is Dr. Orloff, a mad scientist who wants to repair his disfigured daughter's face with skin grafts from other women with the aid of a slavish, blind henchman named Morpho.

== Cast ==
- Howard Vernon as Dr. Orloff
- Conrado San Martín as Inspector Edgar Tanner
- Diana Lorys as Wanda Bronsky / Melissa
- Perla Cristal as Arne
- María Silva as Dany
- Ricardo Valle as Morpho Lautner
- Mara Laso as Irma Gold
- Venancio Muro as Jean "Jeannot" Rousseau
- Félix Dafauce as Chief Inspector Marceau
- Faustino Cornejo as Raymond
- Manuel Vázquez as Klein
- Fernando C. Montes as Malou
- Elena María Tejeiro as Ursula Camila
- Carmen Porcel as Madame Gold
- Jesús Franco as Cabaret Pianist (uncredited)

== Production ==
While filming his tribute to Hollywood musical films (Vampiresas 1930), director Jesús Franco convinced his producers to watch the British film The Brides of Dracula (1960). After the screening, Franco proposed that he could make similar films "in the same vein, but with a different style". Franco eventually convinced the same French co-producer, the Paris-based company Eurociné, who produced Vampiresas 1930. Shooting took place on-location in Madrid and at Estudios Ballesteros. The cast was predominantly Spanish, though the leading role was played by the France-based Swiss actor Howard Vernon.

Franco was concerned how the film would be handled by censors from the heavily-conservative Falangist regime. As a result, he produced two versions of the film, one that was unedited and one that was for British and Spanish audiences that had the scenes with nudity in them cut. Spanish censors were also concerned with films that would damage the reputation of their country. To avoid this, Franco set the film in France, a scheme that would later be employed by other Spanish horror filmmakers like Paul Naschy.

== Release ==
The Awful Dr. Orloff premiered in Madrid, Spain on 9 March 1962 under the title of Gritos en la noche (lit. Screams in the Night). It premiered in Paris on 1 October 1962 under the title L'horrible Dr. Orloff and was released in the United Kingdom as The Demon Doctor in late 1963, with a "X" certificate.

In the U.S. it was released on 7 October 1964 as the second half of a double feature with The Horrible Dr. Hichcock (1962). The Awful Dr. Orloff became the first internationally successful horror and exploitation film production from Spain. The most complete print is the Spanish print, running 93 minutes.

== Reception ==
The film received a negative reception from critics on its initial release. A 1964 review in The New York Times for a double feature of Orloff and The Horrible Dr. Hichcock stated "For once, the adjectives in the titles were not only descriptive but also accurate." The Monthly Film Bulletin described the film "at once appalling and unique, so bad as to be almost enjoyable for its ludicrous qualities, so singular that curiosity hunters are likely to look at it agog." The review noted that one or two shots were "worthy of James Whale or Epstein" and that the score was "quasi-musical noises." The review concluded that it was "a singular film...really most extraordinary."

From retrospective reviews, Donald C. Willis described the film as one of many "mainly trivial variations on Eyes Without a Face", while praising the "lighting of the castle and the night exteriors". In Phil Hardy's book Science Fiction (1984), he stated that The Awful Dr. Orloff was declared as "the initiator of an entire subgenre mixing horror and medical Science Fiction in a gory way bordering on the pornographic".

== Home media ==
A remastered Blu-ray of the film was released in August 2013 by Kino Lorber, containing the French and English-language dubs of the film.

== Sequels ==
A sequel to the film, titled El Secreto del Dr. Orloff ("The Secret of Dr. Orloff", also released as The Mistresses of Dr. Jekyll) and also directed by Franco, was released in 1964. Despite the title, the film had no direct storyline connection to its predecessor, instead featuring a new mad scientist character called Jekyll.

The "Dr. Orloff" was reused by Franco in several subsequent films, usually with Vernon reprising the role:

- Only a Coffin (1967)
- Orloff and the Invisible Man (1970)
- The Sinister Eyes of Dr. Orloff (1973)
- The Sinister Dr. Orloff (1984)
- El siniestro doctor Orloff (1984)
- Faceless (1988)

Franco also reused footage from Awful of Dr. Orloff in Revenge in the House of Usher, which starred Howard Vernon as a different character.
