= Les Impures =

1954 film

- Directed by: Pierre Chevalier
- Written by: Juliette Saint-Giniez; Pierre Chevalier; André Tabet
- Produced by: Simon Barstoff Films (France)
- Starring: Micheline Presle; Raymond Pellegrin
- Music by: Georges van Parys
- Distributed by: Les Films Fernand Rivers
- Release date: 22 November 1954 (France)
- Running time: 88 minutes
- Country: France
- Language: French

Les Impures (lit. 'The Impure [Women]'), is a 1954 French crime drama film, directed by Pierre Chevalier and written by Juliette Saint-Giniez with dialogue by André Tabet, starring Micheline Presle and Raymond Pellegrin. The film is known under the titles Human Cargo (United States) and The Impure Ones (international English title).

== Plot ==
Mario, a gangster, is released from prison after taking the fall for his accomplices. Reluctant to return to crime, he is nevertheless pulled back into his old gang and rewarded with a job for his loyalty. The gang, led by expatriate American Charlie, has started a sex trafficking ring that sends unsuspecting women to French North Africa for prostitution, under the pretext of hiring them as cabaret performers. Mario finds this business distasteful but, needing a livelihood, agrees to go along. He is tasked with wooing Michèle, a nightclub singer and hostess, and sending her off to Tangier. Mario succeeds in seducing Michèle, but develops real feelings for her. He then tries to stop her from leaving for Morocco, but is too late.

In Tangier, Michèle finds herself trapped in a brothel disguised as a nightclub but refuses to prostitute herself. Remorseful, Mario arrives to free her but fails. With the help of one of the prostitutes, Michèle manages to escape and returns to France on her own.

While in France, Mario has befriended Danièle, Michèle's younger sister. When Michèle discovers that Danièle has become infatuated with Mario, she believes he is attempting to recruit her sister as well into prostitution. Michèle tries to shoot Mario; she is briefly detained, after which the police start investigating her and Mario. Charlie and his gang realize that they risk being implicated; they kidnap Danièle to dissuade Michèle from speaking.

Mario begs Michèle for her forgiveness. After she informs him of Danièle's kidnapping, he finds the péniche where Danièle is being held. He fights the other gangsters and manages to rescue Danièle, but is shot by Charlie. The police arrive and arrest the gang. Mario dies in Michèle's arms, saying that it's for the better.

== Cast ==
- Micheline Presle: Michèle
- Raymond Pellegrin: Mario
- William Marshall: Charlie (credited as Bill Marshall)
- Dora Doll: Lili
- Guy Mairesse: Bob
- Jacques Duby: Fernand
- Colette Castel: Danièle
- Daniel Cauchy: Dédé
- René Sarvil: Mr. Dominique
- Jacqueline Noëlle: prostitute
- Lila Kedrova: concierge
- Paul Demange: traffic controller
- Nadine Tallier: nightclub hostess
- Laurence Badie : housemaid

== Release and reception ==
Upon its release in France, the film was rated as suitable for adults only due to its subject matter. Jean de Baroncelli of Le Monde mocked this classification, commenting that the film was the most "chaste" ever banned to minors, and finding it generally mediocre and a waste of the cast's talents.

== Home video ==
Les Impures was released on DVD in 2006.
