= God's Gun =

1976 film by Gianfranco Parolini

- Italian theatrical release poster
- Directed by: Gianfranco Parolini (as Frank Kramer)
- Screenplay by: John Fonseca; Frank Kramer
- Produced by: Menahem Golan; Yoram Globus
- Starring: Lee Van Cleef; Jack Palance; Richard Boone; Leif Garrett; Sybil Danning; Robert Lipton; Cody Palance
- Cinematography: Sandro Mancori
- Edited by: Manlio Camastro
- Music by: Sante Maria Romitelli
- Production companies: Golan-Globus Productions; Dunamis Cinematografica; Rovi Film Produktions
- Distributed by: The Irwin Yablans Company; Cannon Film Distributors
- Release date: March 1977 (US)
- Running time: 94 minutes
- Countries: Italy; Israel
- Languages: English; Italian (dubbed version)

God's Gun, also known as Diamante Lobo, is a 1976 Italian-Israeli Spaghetti Western cowritten and directed by Gianfranco Parolini (credited as Frank Kramer) and starring Lee Van Cleef, Jack Palance, Leif Garrett, Richard Boone and Sybil Danning. Palance plays the head of a vicious group of bandits, while Van Cleef plays a double-role of brothers: a priest and a reformed gunfighter. Leif Garrett plays Johnny, a fatherless boy who brings the reformed gunfighter to town to avenge the priest's murder. It was the next-to-last Western in Van Cleef's filmography, and it's also chronologically the last Western appearance he made during his lifetime.

Instead of being filmed in Italy or Spain as most Spaghetti Westerns were, God's Gun was shot in Israel and produced by Menahem Golan and Yoram Globus, two years before they bought Cannon films. The main cast's dialogue was dubbed: at least in the case of Lee Van Cleef and Richard Boone (who walked out of the film before the production was finished), it has been claimed in several reviews that neither actor did their own voices in post-production, and the same thing has been said of the voice of Jack Palance also.

== Synopsis ==
Sam Clayton (Jack Palance) and his gang arrive in the small town of Juno City, where Father John (Lee Van Cleef) is the priest of the local church. The gang wreaks havoc in town, raping a woman and knifing a man in the back. They leave town, only to be caught by the fearless but unarmed Father John, who brings the gang member responsible for the murder back to town. He is broken out of jail by Clayton and his gang, who then ambush and gun down Father John on the steps of his church. The outlaws then take over the town while waiting for the arrival of the next stagecoach with money.

Johnny O'Hara (Leif Garrett), a local boy, manages to escape the beleaguered town and rides to Mexico in the hope of finding the priest's gunfighter twin brother, Lewis (also Van Cleef). After the two meet, they set off back across the border to clean up Juno and avenge Father John's murder. Meanwhile, Sam Clayton discovers that he is Johnny's father and it is revealed that some fifteen years earlier, during the American Civil War, Jenny O'Hara (Sybil Danning) had been one of Clayton's rape victims, adding to the mystery of Johnny's paternity.

== Cast ==
- Lee Van Cleef as Father John/Lewis
- Jack Palance as Sam Clayton
- Richard Boone as The Sheriff
- Sybil Danning as Jenny
- Leif Garrett as Johnny
- Robert Lipton as Jess Clayton
- Cody Palance as Zeke Clayton
- Ian Sander as "Red" Clayton
- Pnina Rosenblum as Chester "Chesty"
- Zila Carni as Juanita Lewis
- Heinz Bernard as Judge Barrett
- Didi Lukov as Rip
- Ricardo David as "Angel George"
- Chin Chin as Willy
- Rafi Ben Ami as Mortimer

== Production ==
Leif Garrett and Lee Van Cleef starred together in two Westerns, Kid Vengeance (1976) and God's Gun, which were both filmed in 1975 in Israel. Both films would be the last of Van Cleef's Westerns. Although Kid Vengeance was filmed and completed before God's Gun, the latter movie was actually released before Kid Vengeance: God's Gun was released in March 1977, while Kid Vengeance was released in August 1977. Chronologically speaking, God's Gun was Van Cleef's last Western film.

Richard Boone walked off the film's shooting before it was completed, leaving his role to be dubbed by another actor. In an interview with Cleveland Amory in Israel in May 1976, Boone told Amory: "I'm starring in the worst picture ever made. The producer is an Israeli and the director is Italian, and they don't speak. Fortunately it doesn't matter, because the director is deaf in both ears."

== Home media ==
God's Gun was released on Blu-ray Disc in the Region A format by Kino Lorber on February 8, 2022.

A prior VHS release carried the title A Bullet from God.
