= Devil Hunter (film) =

1980 film

Devil Hunter (a.k.a. The Man Hunter)
- Severin Films 2008 DVD cover
- Directed by: Jesús Franco (as Clifford Brown)
- Screenplay by: Julián Esteban (as Julius Valery); Jesús Franco (as Clifford Brown)
- Story by: Julián Esteban (as Julius Valery)
- Produced by: Julián Esteban (as Julián Esteban Gómez); Daniel Lesoeur; Karl Spiehs
- Starring: Al Cliver; Ursula Buchfellner
- Cinematography: Juan Soler
- Edited by: Nicole Guettard; Federico Vich
- Music by: Jesús Franco (as Jess Franco)
- Production companies: Eurociné; J.E. Films (Julian Esteban Films); Lisa Film
- Release date: 5 December 1980 (West Germany)
- Running time: 102 minutes
- Countries: West Germany; Spain; France
- Language: German

Devil Hunter (also known as The Man Hunter, Mandingo Manhunter, Jungfrau unter Kannibalen and Sexo Caníbal) is a 1980 horror film directed by Jesús Franco under the pseudonym "Clifford Brown" and written by Franco and Julián Esteban (under the pseudonym Julius Valery). It was shot back-to-back with Franco's Mondo Cannibale (also 1980). It is one of the infamous "video nasties" that were banned in the United Kingdom in the 1980s.

Lina Romay was credited with co-directing this film, while Franco's first wife Nicole Guettard edited it. This shows that Franco was still with Guettard as late as 1980 (eventually they broke up and she was replaced in Franco's life by Romay). Pierre Chevalier was the art director on this film.

== Release ==
The film was released on 5 December 1980 in West Germany as Jungfrau unter Kannibalen, and in Spain as Sexo Canibal. It was theatrically released in the U.S., the U.K. and Italy as The Man Hunter, but was later released to video in the U.K. as Devil Hunter. It also appeared on U.S. video as Mandingo Manhunter. It was banned as a video nasty in the United Kingdom in the early 1980s.

== Critical reception ==
Devil Hunter has been critically panned. Kurt Dahlke of DVD Talk called it a "horrible, trying piece of dreck that should have remained legendary and lost. That said, it's pretty fun stuff." DVD Verdict, similarly, called the film "trash" and wrote that "the storyline is threadbare and the characters are idiots (the horrid dubbing makes their dialogue endlessly entertaining) but Jess Franco does not hesitate in blasting out the nipples and bloodshed."

== Cast ==
- Al Cliver as Peter Weston
- Ursula Buchfellner as Laura Crawford (as Ursula Fellner)
- Antonio Mayans as Jack (as Robert Foster)
- Antonio de Cabo as Thomas
- Bertrand Altmann as The Devil (as Burt Altman)
- Gisela Hahn as Jane
- Muriel Montossé as Girl on Yacht (as Victoria Adams)
- Werner Pochath as Chris
- Melo Costa as Pablito (as Leonardo Costa)
- Aline Mess as Cannibal Priestess (as Lynn Mess)
- Claude Boisson as Cannibal Chief
