= Heinz Bernard =

British actor, director and theatre manager

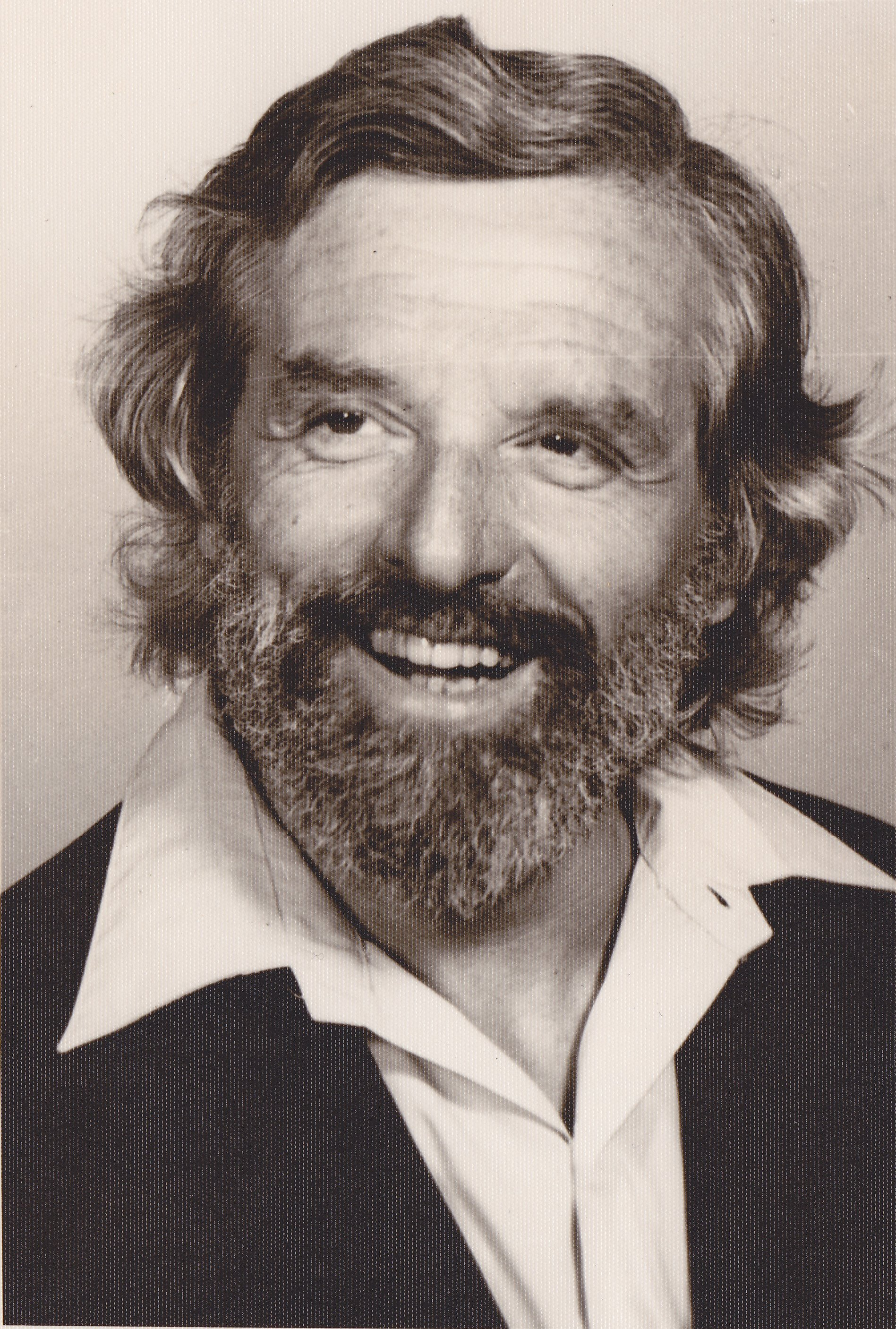
- Born: Heinz Messinger; 22 December 1923; Nuremberg, Germany
- Died: 18 December 1994 (aged 70); London, UK
- Resting place: Ashes are at Kibbutz Ramat Yochanan
- Other name: Heinz Bernhard Löwenstein
- Occupations: Actor, director, producer
- Spouse: Nettie Lowenstein
- Children: Anna, Michael and Jonathan

Heinz Bernhard Löwenstein, known as Heinz Bernard (22 December 1923 – 18 December 1994) was a British actor and director and theatre manager. Of Polish-Jewish and German-Jewish descent, he lived and worked in Israel from 1971-81. He trained at the Royal Academy of Dramatic Arts (RADA), graduating in 1951.

After graduation, he worked in a group of travelling players throughout Britain, performing every night in different towns and villages. He went on to become the manager of the famous leftist Unity Theatre, London. As manager of Unity Theatre he staged the first professional British production of a Brecht play, The Visions of Simone Machard. Lionel Bart, who later gained fame as the author of the musical Oliver!, designed the poster. Bernard also acted and directed in the travelling Century Theatre and taught at RADA, where he was director of admissions.

Heinz's surname at birth was Messinger. He was adopted as a baby by a family called Löwenstein. After leaving RADA he worked under the professional name Harry Bernard, later becoming Heinz Bernard.

His daughter Anna Lowenstein was elected Esperantist of the Year in December 2019.

== Childhood ==
Heinz Messinger grew up in a Jewish family in Nuremberg in Nazi Germany. He was adopted by the Lowenstein family after his biological father died of tuberculosis. His biological father was the hazzan of the city's Orthodox synagogue. As was usual at the time, he was not told by his parents that he was adopted. In March 1932, when Heinz was nine years old, his adoptive father Max Lowenstein committed suicide following the collapse of his business. In 1933 the Nazis came to power in Germany and began persecuting the Jews. Jews were banned from state schools and only one Jewish school, the Israelitische Realschule, in neighbouring Fürth, was allowed to operate (it was closed in 1939) where Heinz attended.

In November 1935, the Nuremberg Laws deprived Heinz's family of their German citizenship. In December 1936 Heinz had had his bar mitzvah in the Orthodox synagogue of Nuremberg where his biological father had been the hazzan. In August 1938 Julius Streicher, editor of Der Stürmer, ordered the large Nuremberg Reform Synagogue torn down. In October 1938, during Kristallnacht, the Orthodox synagogue where Heinz had had his bar mitzvah was burnt down along with most of Germany's synagogues. He hid with relatives in Frankfurt.

In August 1938, Poland issued an order depriving Polish Jews residing outside of Poland of their citizenship. Although Heinz was born in Germany and adopted by native German Jews, his real father had emigrated from Poland. In return, Germany began expelling Jews of Polish origin to Poland. The Poles refused to admit them and some 17,000 Jews were trapped between the two countries at Zbąszyń. At some point the Germans began tracing adopted children of Polish emigrants and in 1939 began proceedings to expel Heinz.

Jews in Nazi Germany were eligible for one-way passports only, to leave the country; other countries would not admit them due to this. Heinz was ineligible even for this kind of passport as his pre-adoption (biological) father was born in Poland. He was also ineligible for a Polish passport. His mother eventually procured a forged Polish passport for him. In July 1939 the MP Josiah Wedgwood, who dedicated his life to saving Jews, asked a parliamentary question directed at the Home Secretary:

"Colonel Wedgwood asked the Home Secretary whether he will authorise a visa to Frau Betty Loewenstein, [sic] and her son, Heinz, Nurenberg, guarantee and application for whom was made by Walter Block, Alsager, Stoke-on-Trent, on 10th May, in view of the fact that the boy, aged 16 years, is under expulsion orders for 10th July?"

As a result of this question Heinz and his mother, Betty (maiden name Ehrlich) were granted transit visas to pass through England and join his uncles, who had migrated to the United States. On 28 August 1939, Bernard was sent to England by plane. His mother meant to join him a few days later but on the day she planned to leave Germany, war broke out trapping her on the continent. In mid-1940, she received a U.S. visa and took the Trans-Siberian Railway, travelling through Japanese-occupied China to Japan and sailing from there to Seattle. From Seattle she took a bus to Pennsylvania.

Heinz remained trapped in England and learned English by sitting in cinemas watching movies. He eventually joined a home for Jewish orphans run by exiles from the German Communist Party where he organized weekly plays. Heinz worked in a variety of low-paid jobs, including as a rabbit skinner and a waiter, saving enough money to attend the Royal Academy of Dramatic Arts (RADA) in London.

After the war, his mother informed him that he was adopted. A biological brother and sister had reached Palestine before the war and now made contact with him. Heinz's brother was a co-founder of Kibbutz Ramat Yochanan. Heinz was a UN-registered refugee with no citizenship of any country, eventually taking British citizenship in 1969. Heinz Bernard's biological mother was one of 237 Jews deported from Frankfurt to Kalevi-Liiva in Estonia in September 1942 on transport DA 406. After a 9 day journey she was shot on arrival. A sister was also murdered (location and date unknown).

In 1992, Heinz applied for German citizenship. His application was rejected on the grounds that he was "not a former German citizen".

== Career ==
In the 1950s, Bernard was manager of Unity Theatre, a radical theatre in London. He directed the English Language and British Premieres of many Bertolt Brecht plays between 1958 and 1963. Other world premieres included Arthur Adamov's "The Scavengers" and the first ever British production of an Israeli play, "The Ganze Macher" by Ephraim Kishon (1958). There was also a premiere of a play "Call me Not Naomi", written by his wife, Nettie Lowenstein under the pen-name "Ruth Messinger" (the name of Bernard's older sister, murdered by the Nazis) and (translation by Heinz Bernard) Hungarian author Gyula Hay's play "The Bridge of Life". In 1962, Bernard organized an appeal to raise money for a new theatre, sponsors included Alec Guinness, John Osborne and a leaflet was signed by Alfie Bass and Paul Robeson. Unity Theatre provided the entertainment for the Aldermaston Marches and as its manager, Bernard was close to the front of every single Aldermaston march.

In the early 1960s, Heinz was director of a travelling theatre in the Lake District in Cumbria called the Century Theatre. At the time television was rare and the travelling theatre provided a major form of local entertainment. In the late 1960s he played the role of the Rabbi in the West End production of Fiddler on the Roof (at Her Majesty's Theatre).

From 1971 to 1981, Bernard lived in Israel, where he worked at the National Theatre Habima and appeared in the educational TV series, Here We Are and Neighbours. The shows aired twice a week on Israeli Educational Television for 17 years, making him a familiar face to a generation of Israelis and leading to parts in a wide variety of mainstream Israeli cinema. In 1981, he returned to England, where he had to restart his career. He continued to work until his death of a rare blood disease in 1994. He died four days before his 71st birthday.

== Filmography ==
| Year | Title | Role | Notes |
|---|---|---|---|
| 1961 | Taste of Fear | Plainclothes Officer | Uncredited |
| 1964 | Traitor's Gate | Martin | |
| 1973 | Abu el Banat | Professor | |
| 1975 | Dar Ghorbat | Arbeiter in der U-Bahn | |
| 1976 | The Sell Out | Laboratory Officer | |
| 1976 | The Passover Plot | High Priest | Uncredited |
| 1976 | God's Gun | Judge Barrett | |
| 1977 | Operation Thunderbolt | British Hostage | Uncredited |
| 1977 | Vengeance | George | Uncredited |
| 1978 | Circle of Iron | Ferryman | Uncredited |
| 1978 | Ha-Shu'al B'Lool Hatarnagalot | Wagon driver | |
