= S.C. Dacy =

American film producer

Scott Constantine Dacy (born 2 November 1956), better known professionally as S.C. Dacy, is an American writer, producer, and publicist. He was born in Bay City, Michigan.

Along with Sybil Danning and Robert P. Palazzo, Dacy co-founded Adventuress Productions in 1989.

Dacy has also appeared as an extra in several films, including King Kong.
