= Faceless (1988 film) =

Horror film by Jess Franco

- French film poster
- Directed by: Jesús Franco
- Written by: Michel Lebrun; René Château
- Story by: René Château
- Produced by: René Château
- Starring: Helmut Berger: Brigitte Lahaie; Telly Savalas; Christopher Mitchum; Stéphane Audran
- Cinematography: Maurice Fellous
- Edited by: Christine Pansu
- Music by: Romano Musumarra
- Production company: René Château Productions
- Distributed by: Éditions René Chateau (Paris)
- Release date: 22 June 1988
- Running time: 97 minutes
- Country: France
- Language: English

Faceless (French: Les prédateurs de la nuit) is a 1988 French horror film directed by Jesús Franco. The film stars Helmut Berger as Dr. Flamand, Brigitte Lahaie as Nathalie, Christopher Mitchum as Sam Morgan, and Stéphane Audran. In the film, Dr. Flamand and his assistant Nathalie lure unsuspecting victims to use their skin to perform plastic surgery on the doctor's disfigured sister. A New York businessman hires private detective Sam Morgan to find his missing fashion model daughter.

The film was Franco's highest budget film since the 1960s. It was produced by René Château, a home video distributor in France who had released various genre films to the French video market. The narrative of the film was very similar to that of Franco's film The Awful Dr. Orloff (1962), a film he remade a few times during his career. It was released theatrically in Paris and received lukewarm reviews from French genre magazine Mad Movies and a negative one from Variety.

== Plot ==
A former patient of famed plastic surgeon Dr. Frank Flamand seeks revenge for a botched operation by throwing acid at him, but she misses; the acid instead lands on the face of his sister, Ingrid, leaving her severely disfigured. At a photoshoot in Paris, the doctor's assistant and lover Nathalie kidnaps the American model Barbara Hallen. Barbara is then locked in the basement of Flamand's clinic, where it is revealed that Flamand kidnaps young women and uses their blood and body parts to perform "miracle treatments" for his patients.

In New York City, Barbara's father Terry Hallen hires her ex-boyfriend, the private detective Sam Morgan, to find her. Once in Paris, Morgan begins investigating. As Flamand plans to graft Barbara's face onto his own daughters, Flamand and Nathalie are instructed by surgeon Dr. Orloff to meet Dr. Karl Heinz Moser, who agrees to assist Flamand with his surgery. They return to find Barbara's face has been badly cut by Flamand's mute assistant Gordon.

As Morgan continues his investigation, Flamand kidnaps call-girl and former patient Melissa, to use for the face transplant. Moser arrives for the operation. As the operation is performed, Melissa's face is destroyed leading Gordon to sever Melissa's head from her body using a chainsaw, leading Flamand and Nathalie to kidnap another woman.

Morgan traces a credit card belonging to Barbara to the Paris suburb of Saint-Cloud and to Flamand's clinic. After returning from the clinic, Morgan views security footage at realizes the watch Nathalie was wearing matches the watch Barbara had when she was abducted. As Morgan decides to return to the clinic, a nurse at the clinic enters the basement and finds all of the girls locked up, leading her to be killed by Gordon. Moser, Flamand, and Nathalie remove the actress's face and successfully graft it to Ingrid's skin.

Morgan returns to the clinic and is attacked by Gordon but manages to kill him. Morgan locates Barbara and the other captured women but gets locked in Barbara's cell by Nathalie. Flamand, Moser and Nathalie then brick up the cell. As murder victims have piled up, authorities close in, and Flamand, Nathalie and Ingrid take Moser's advice to leave France, leaving Barbara and Morgan alive in their cells. Sam reveals he has sent Terry a message, and that if he doesn't leave a message in 12 hours, Terry should "send in the marines, Merry Christmas." Terry says to his office executive to get him on the first flight to Paris in hopes of rescuing the two.

== Cast ==
- Helmut Berger as Dr. Frank Flamand
- Brigitte Lahaie as Nathalie
- Christopher Mitchum as Sam Morgan
- Telly Savalas as Terry Hallen
- Caroline Munro as Barbara Hallen
- Anton Diffring as Dr. Karl Heinz Moser
- Gerard Zalcberg as Gordon, the henchman
- Howard Vernon as Dr. Orloff
- Stéphane Audran as Mrs. Sherman
- Tilda Thamar as Mme François
- Daniel Beretta as the man from the Bois de Boulogne

== Production ==
The films producer was René Château, who is also credited for the story and adaptation under the name Fred Castle. Château was a fan of genre and action films, and had a hand in introducing French audiences to the films of Bruce Lee. Château had his own video publishing company and published films like The Texas Chain Saw Massacre (1974) which was previously banned in France. In 1985, the French Minister of Culture Jack Lang allowed the Centre National de la Cinématographie (CNC) to implement a series of tax shelters known as SOFICAs (Sociétes pour le financement du cinéma et de l'audiovisuel). These changes led to changes such as a films shot in English to receive support from CNC.

Faceless uses the same narrative as Franco's film The Awful Dr. Orloff (1962) while changing the characters' names. Franco had previously reused the story of the 1962 film in several other film projects, such as The Vengeance of Dr. Mabuse (1972) and Jack the Ripper (1976). Faceless was shot between December 1987 and January 1988 in Paris. It was the first feature film director Jesús Franco made with an international cast and a full sized-crew in nearly 20 years. The film's budget was Franco's largest since Succubus (1968). The special effects manager on Faceless was Jacques Gastineau. It was his second special effects job after doing work in Terminus (1987). Gastineau discussed the work, noting that it was a rare opportunity to make special effects like this in France.

== Release ==
Faceless was released in France on June 22, 1988, as Les prédateurs de la nuit. On its first week in Paris, it had 23,327 entries. It screened for nine weeks in Paris with a total of 66,214 attendants. The film was released in different languages, including French.

Faceless had its first release in North America through the Toronto-based Malofilm. This release was cut by three minutes. Faceless was first released uncut on its Media Blasters/Shriek Show DVD in February 2004. The film was released on blu-ray and 4K Ultra HD Blu-ray by Severin Films on August 30, 2022.

== Reception ==
From contemporary reviews, the film was reviewed by a critic credited as "Len." in Variety who reviewed the film on June 26, 1988. "Len." referred to the film as a "routine gore-and-softcore shocker" noting that the "Special gore effects are part for the course. The director, Jesus Franco, a specialist of porn and horror films, seems to have directed with his eyes closed."

In French film magazine Mad Movies, critic Marc Toullec found the script resembled a soap opera and that the film paled in comparison to its inspiration Eyes Without a Face (1960). Toullec found that fans of horror films will appreciate the variety of instruments used to create gory special effects. In the same publication, Marcel Burel also complimented the effects while finding it had an American made-for-television film quality of dialogue.

The "incredibly gory" film was deemed one of Franco's most "effective" and "technically competent efforts" by Jay Slater of Rue Morgue.

Jeffrey Kaufmann of Blu-ray.com noted the film's "over the top" gore effects ranged from silly to effective and concluded, "Faceless is just flat out goofy a lot of the time, and with a cast that kind of has to be seen to be believed (and maybe not even then), this has the expected amount of Franco-esque titillation combined with occasional bursts of Grand Guignol weirdness."
