= Pierre Chevalier (director) =

French film director and screenwriter

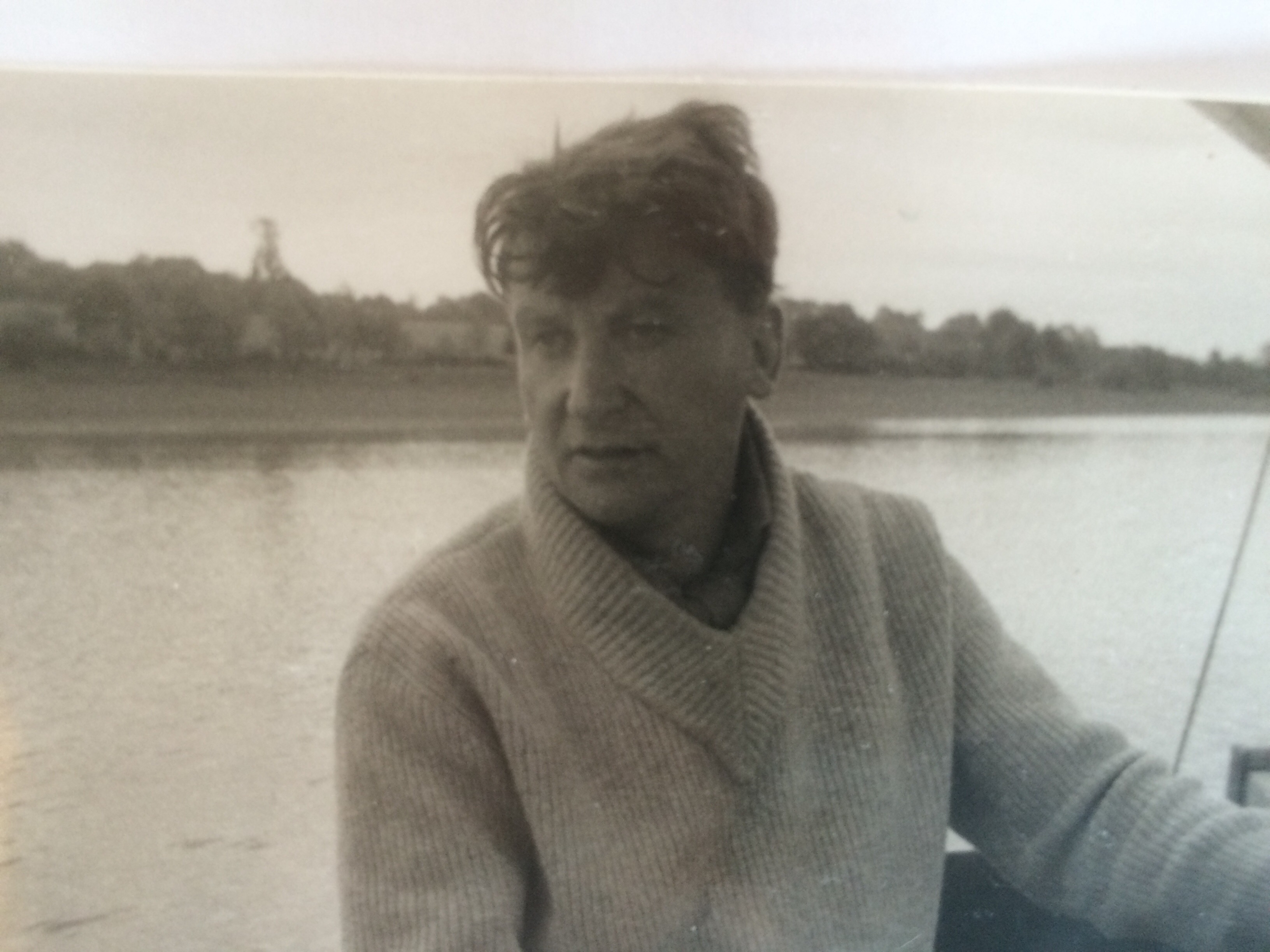
Pierre Chevalier

Pierre Chevalier (born in Orbec, France on 23 March 1915; died on 10 February 2005) was a French film director and screenwriter. His films included mainstream, erotic and pornographic films. Horror film buffs know him for his 1971 opus Orloff and the Invisible Man (a.k.a. The Invisible Dead).

He also assisted well-known directors in films, notably with Henri Verneuil, René Clément, Jesus Franco and others. Chevalier directed four films with French actress Alice Arno. He served as art director on Jesus Franco's Man Hunter (1980), and filmed some additional footage that was added to the adult film Cecilia (the retitled 1983 re-release version of Jesus Franco's Sexual Aberrations of a Married Woman).

Jesus Franco co-directed Convoy of Women with Chevalier (uncredited) in 1974. The film was re-released in 1978 as East of Berlin.

== Filmography ==
=== Film director ===
- 1955: Les Impures
- 1956: Vous pigez?
- 1957: L'Auberge en folie
- 1957: Fernand clochard
- 1958: En bordée
- 1958: The Sicilian
- 1959: Soupe au lait
- 1959: Charley's Godmother
- 1960: Le Mouton
- 1961: Auguste
- 1962: Peur panique (Règlements de comptes)
- 1963: Clémentine chérie
- 1963: Le Bon Roi Dagobert
- 1968: Nathalie, l'amour s'éveille
- 1968: Huyendo de sí mismo
- 1971: Orloff et l'homme invisible / Orloff and the Invisible Man (a.k.a. La Vie amoureuse de l'homme invisible, a.k.a. The Invisible Dead)
- 1973: Pigalle carrefour des illusions
- 1973: Avortement clandestin!
- 1974: Des hommes de joie (or Hommes de joie pour femmes vicieuses) a.k.a. Men for Sale, a.k.a. Ladies House of Pleasure
- 1974: Convoi de filles / Convoy of Women (re-released in 1978 as East of Berlin)
- 1974: La Maison des filles perdues / The House of Lost Women
- 1976: Vergewaltigt
- 1978: Viol, la grande peur
- 1980: La Pension des surdoués
- 1981: La Maison Tellier
- 1983: Cecilia (this re-release version of Jesus Franco's Sexual Aberrations of a Married Woman contained additional footage shot by Chevalier)
- 1984: The Panther Squad
- 1984: Foutez-moi par tous les trous

=== Assistant film director ===
Chevalier assisted in the making of the following films:

Year	Film title	Film director
1946	Le Père tranquille	René Clément
1946	Messieurs Ludovic	Jean-Paul Le Chanois
1946	Monsieur chasse	Willy Rozier
1946	Les Maudits	René Clément
1948	Au-delà des grilles	René Clément
1949	Histoires extraordinaires	Jean Faurez
1950	La Marie du port	Marcel Carné
1950	L'Étrange Madame X	Jean Grémillon
1951	La Table aux crevés	Henri Verneuil
1952	Full House	Henri Verneuil
1952	Le Fruit défendu	Henri Verneuil
1952	Horizons sans fin	Jean Dréville
1952	Le Mouton à cinq pattes	Henri Verneuil

=== Screenwriter ===
- 1955: Les Impures
- 1959: La Marraine de Charley
- 1960: Le Mouton
- 1961: Auguste
- 1971: Orloff et l'homme invisible (a.k.a. La Vie amoureuse de l'homme invisible)
- 1974: La Maison des filles perdues
