= Cannibal Terror =

1981 film

- Directed by: Alain Deruelle
- Written by: Julio Pérez Tabernero; H.L. Rostaine; Jesús Franco (uncredited)
- Produced by: Marius Lesoeur
- Starring: Silvia Solar; Pamela Stanford; Olivier Mathot; Antonio Mayans
- Music by: Jean Jacques Lemeztre
- Production company: Eurociné
- Release date: 1981
- Running time: 93 minutes
- Countries: France; Spain
- Language: French

Cannibal Terror (French: Terreur Cannibale) is a 1981 French cannibal exploitation film directed by Alain Deruelle written by Julio Pérez Tabernero, H.L. Rostaine and Jesús Franco as an uncredited co-writer on the film. It stars Silvia Solar, Pamela Stanford, Olivier Mathot and Antonio Mayans. Released at the end of the "cannibal boom", the film is a French production, unlike most other cannibal films, which were predominantly made by Italian filmmakers.

== Plot ==
Two criminals, Mario and Roberto, meet a woman named Lina at a bar. Lina mentions that before the meeting, she met a little girl named Florence, the daughter of Madame and Monsieur Danville, a wealthy couple. The three decide to kidnap Florence and request money to give her back to her family. As a precaution, they choose to fly to the jungle and stay at their friend Antonio's house, where he lives with his wife, Manuela.

When they get to the jungle, they meet a woman, Mickey, who decides to drive them to the border in cannibal land. After they pass the border, their car breaks down, and Mickey goes to a nearby river to cool down the radiator. However, she is captured by the cannibal tribe, who take her to the village and cannibalize her. The criminals, along with Florence, manage to escape.

When they reach Antonio's house, he leaves for a few days. During Antonio's absence, Mario stalks Manuela while she showers, and in the woods, he decides to tie her to 2 trees and rape her. Hours later, Antonio returns, and he discovers Manuela bruised, and she confesses what happened to her, with Antonio promising to avenge her rape. The next day, Antonio takes Mario into the woods to hunt. However, he confronts him at gunpoint, and he forces Mario to tie himself to the tree. He then leaves him while cannibals kill and devour Mario.

The Danvilles learned where their daughter was and decided to fly to the jungle. Along with some border guards and hunters, they search for Florence in the jungle. In the meantime, the gang, after crossing a river, gets ambushed by the cannibals, who take them to the village. Lina and Roberto are tied to trees, and Florence is taken away to play with some of the tribe's children. Lina gets devoured, and Roberto is dismembered and cannibalized as well. The Danvilles and the guards reach the cannibal village after a shootout with them, and Antonio asks the cannibal leader where the girl is. The Danvilles reunite with Florence, who is unharmed.

== Cast ==
- Silvia Solar as Madame Danville (as Sylvia Solar)
- Gérard Lemaire as Roberto
- Pamela Stanford as Manuela
- Olivier Mathot as Monsieur Danville
- Antoine Fontaine as Pepe (as Tony Fontaine)
- Antonio Mayans as Mario (as Antony Mayans)
- Mariam Camacho as Lina
- Annabelle as Florence Danville (as Le Petit Annabelle)
- Antonio Jover as Antonio
- Michel Laury
- Amparo Marsilla
- Montserrat Salvador
- Sabrina Siani

== Production ==
The film was shot in Benidorm, Spain.

The film shares some footage with Mondo Cannibale directed by Jesús Franco. Both films share a number of locations, cast, and even dubbing actors. Some connections which suggest more than a mere borrowing of footage are:

- Sabrina Siani is the White Cannibal Queen of Mondo Cannibale and main character and also appears in a bar scene in Cannibal Terror.
- Several shots of the dancing cannibal tribe in their village are common to both films and several shots appear only in one or the other.
- One actor with a very distinctive face and a large Mick Jagger-type of mouth is seen in Cannibal Terror in no less than three roles (two cannibals and one border guard) and is also quite visible as one of the cannibals devouring Al Cliver's wife Elisabeth in Mondo Cannibale.
- The man who plays the guitar at the house in Cannibal Terreur is one of the two guys who finds Al Cliver after he has had his arm cut off in Mondo Cannibale.

In addition to these connections are the obvious cast parallels of Olivier Mathot and Antonio Mayans, both of whom have starring roles in both films. Porn star Pamela Stanford plays Manuela in Cannibal Terror, and has the brief role of the unfortunate Elisabeth Taylor in Mondo cannibale. She also appeared in a number of Franco's other films around this time period, including Lorna, the Exorcist. The actor who plays Roberto in Cannibal Terror, Gerard Lemaitre, is the captain of the boat at the beginning of Mondo Cannibale.
