= Sybil Danning =

Austrian actress

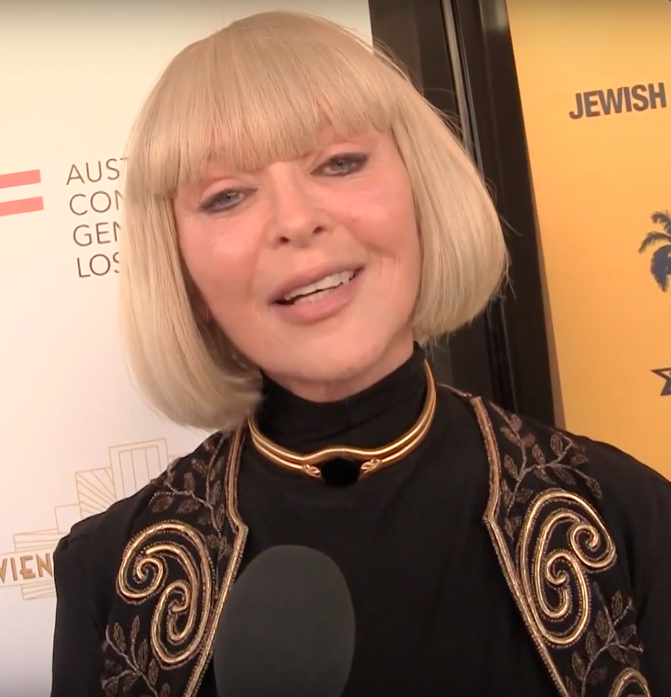
- Danning in Los Angeles, California, 2018
- Born: Sybille Johanna Danninger; Wels, Austria
- Other names: Cybil Danning; Sybil Danning Lasse
- Occupations: Actress; model; film producer
- Years active: 1968–2011
- Spouse: Horst Lasse (m. 1991)
- Website: sybildanning.net

Sybil Danning (born Sybille Johanna Danninger) is an Austrian retired actress and film producer, best known for her onscreen appearances in B-movies during the 1970s and 1980s.

== Early life ==
Danning was born in Wels, Austria. Her father was an American military officer who returned to the United States, resulting in her growing up primarily in Eatontown, New Jersey, and Sacramento, California. After she finished school, she returned to Europe. While in Salzburg, she worked as a nurse and studied cosmetology.

She then started working in a clothing store in Salzburg, and tried modeling work, from which she was invited to take up acting roles.

== Acting ==
Danning started her onscreen career in soft-core erotic films such as Rolf Thiele's German-Italian production Komm nur, mein liebstes Vögelein (Come on, my dearest little bird). In 1971, she was featured in the "classic sexploitation" movie titled Housewives Report, from which she went on to play in Edward Dmytryk's 1972 thriller Bluebeard alongside Richard Burton and Raquel Welch, and, the same year, to appear in the giallo The Red Queen Kills Seven Times.

After a string of European sexploitation movies, such as Naughty Nymphs and Albino, she appeared in minor roles such as Eugenie, the maid to Comtesse de la Faye, in The Three Musketeers (1973). She also ventured into spaghetti westerns, such as God's Gun (1976), starring Lee Van Cleef. She was a Valkyrie warrior in the 1980 space opera Battle Beyond the Stars.

In 1983, she had a "domineering shower scene" with Linda Blair in 1983's Chained Heat, a women-in-prison film. She appeared nude in a ten-page Playboy pictorial.

In 1984, she starred in the erotic thriller They're Playing with Fire. She played a femme fatale opposite Robert Vaughn in the episode "Face to Face" of The Hitchhiker television series.

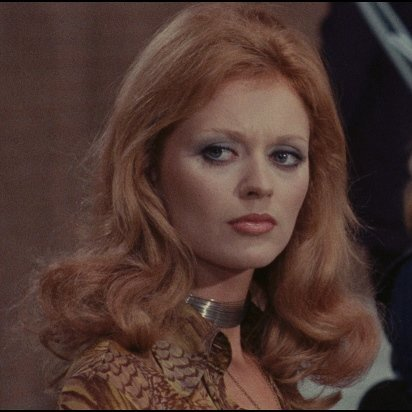
Danning in The Red Queen Kills Seven Times (1972)

Her popularity among the B-movie audience led to talk about work in James Bond films and Terminator sequels, which resulted in nothing. She announced her retirement from acting in 1986.

In 2003, Danning was invited by Kevin Clement of the Chiller Theatre in New Jersey to meet with fans; in 2004 the theater screened the documentary UnConventional about the event.

In 2007, Danning returned to the screen in the British-Austrian production Jump!, loosely based on the Halsman murder case, starring Patrick Swayze and Ben Silverstone. The same year, she appeared in Rob Zombie‘s faux trailer Werewolf Women of the SS for Quentin Tarantino's Grindhouse. She appeared in Zombie's 2007 remake of John Carpenter's Halloween (1978).

In 2009, she played a vampire out for revenge in five episodes of the gay-themed vampire television series The Lair. In 2010, Danning appeared in the horror film Virus X, and in 2011 she appeared in a music video for American hard rock band the Last Vegas.

== Investments in sports clubs ==
From 2002 to 2003, Danning was part owner of the German ice hockey team, SC Riessersee, becoming the first woman to ever own a German hockey team. Danning brought in three American players, and saw the team return to the highest division in German ice hockey.

In 2011, Danning expressed her interest for the ownership of Premier League's Sheffield Wednesday F.C., but the Owls' owner and chairman Milan Mandarić rejected the approach.

== Selected filmography ==
- 1972 The Red Queen Kills Seven Times as Lulu Palm
- 1972 Bluebeard as The Prostitute
- 1973 The Three Musketeers as Eugenie
- 1976 God's Gun as Jenny
- 1976 Whispering Death as Sally
- 1976 The Twist as the Secretary
- 1979 The Concorde... Airport '79 as Amy
- 1980 Battle Beyond the Stars as Saint-Exmin
- 1981 The Salamander as Lili Anders
- 1982 Julie Darling as Susan
- 1983 Chained Heat as Ericka
- 1984 They're Playing with Fire as Dr. Diane Stevens
- 1984 Jungle Warriors as Angel
- 1984 The Panther Squad as Ilona / The Panther
- 1984 The Seven Magnificent Gladiators as Julia
- 1985 Malibu Express as Contessa Luciana
- 1985 Howling II: Your Sister Is a Werewolf as Stirba Crosscoe
- 1985 Young Lady Chatterley II as Judith Grimmer
- 1986 The Tomb as Jade
- 1986 Reform School Girls as Warden Sutter
- 2007 Grindhouse as Gretchen Krupp (segment "Werewolf Women of the SS")
- 2007 Halloween as Nurse Wynn
- 2008 Jump! as Anna Gruber

== Awards and nominations ==
Year	Award	Category	Film	Result
1981	Saturn Award	Outstanding Achievement	Battle Beyond the Stars	Won
1984	Golden Raspberry Awards	Worst Supporting Actress	Chained Heat and Hercules	Won
