= L'Écran fantastique =

French SF-Fantasy magazine

- Cover of the magazine's 50th Anniversary issue
- Editor: Alain Schlockoff
- Categories: Film
- Frequency: 12 issues a year (8 Reboot+4 Vintage)
- Founded: 1969
- Company: Financière de loisirs
- Country: France
- Based in: Neuilly-sur-Seine, Hauts-de-Seine, France
- Language: French
- Website: ecranfantastique.fr
- ISSN: 0769-1920

L'Écran fantastique is a French magazine created in 1969 by Alain Schlockoff, dedicated to fantastic and science fiction cinema.

== History ==
After falling out with the publisher of Horizons du fantastique (1967–1976), a film and literature publication, Schlockoff started the film-focused L'Écran fantastique on his own with scarce ressources. The magazine began its publication history with a limited trial run in 1969 and 1970, which lacked the print design and formal publishing of Horizons du fantastique.

It was then relaunched as a professionally printed publication in December 1970, but still struggled to find a reliable publisher. Though billed as a quarterly, it remained subject to schedule disruptions and some projected issues of L'Écran fantastique were reformatted into installments of Cinéma d'aujourd'hui, a collection of monographs published by movie literature specialists FilmÉditions.

L'Écran fantastique finally became a regular publication in June 1977 through a deal with the Librairie des Champs-Élysées. Although another publisher change would occur in 1979, the magazine was now established and its frequency increased, first to bimonthly in 1980, then to monthly in 1982.

The title celebrated its 50th anniversary with a special commemorative issue in May 2019.

In 2020, it was rebooted again and split into two brands: L'Écran fantastique reboot, which is dedicated to current releases, and L'Écran fantastique vintage, which offers retrospective issues on specific themes, in the style of the publication's early years.

== English version ==
An English-language version of the magazine, simply called Fantastique, debuted in the United Kingdom in 2009, with eyes on a possible US launch. The market, however, proved unfavorable and publication of the English version stopped after just three issues.

== Film festival ==
The magazine's publisher also promoted the Paris International Festival of Fantastic and Science-Fiction Film, which ran for eighteen editions between 1972 and 1989.

== See also ==
- Mad Movies
