= Antonio Mayans =

Spanish actor

- Born: 4 May 1939 (age 87); València, Spain
- Other name: Robert Foster
- Occupations: Actor, production manager, dubbing director
- Years active: 1959–present
- Agent: Ana López – Actores y Actrices

José Antonio Mayáns Hervás (born 4 May 1939) is a Spanish actor, production manager and dubbing director. Beginning with supporting roles in large productions, he became a character actor in many Spanish genre films, and later found employment on television.

== Career ==
Mayans took his first steps in film through Spanish-based American producer Samuel Bronston. Having learned about the shooting of John Paul Jones (1959) in Dénia, he was hired as a stuntman thanks to his unusually good command of English for the time, and soon found himself serving as a translator between director John Farrow and the Spanish cast. He was brought back two years later for King of Kings (1961), where he made his speaking debut as a young John the Evangelist. Buoyed by this exposure, he decided to make acting his full-time career, honing his craft under the tutelage of American expatriate thespian and teacher William Layton. Mayans also played a priest in a short docudrama produced by Bronston about the Valley of the Fallen.

Mayans became a friend of Spanish-based Argentinian star Jorge Rigaud, with whom he shared the screen on a number of occasions. In the 1960s and 1970s, he was also a popular photonovel model, forming a regular couple with es:Maria José Cantudo. Amidst the moral liberalization that followed General Franco's death, he appeared in several S-rated movies, a new classification mostly used for sex films that bridged the previous era's strict censorship and the full-on pornography that would come about in the mid-1980s.

Mayans places his first collaboration with director Jesús Franco in 1972 on the set of Night of the Skull. He would go on to work with the director many times, and succeeded Eddie Constantine and Howard Vernon as Franco's regular hero, private investigator Alfredo Pereira (sometimes Al or Fred Pereira). The director supposedly told him he was his favorite in the role. He also played the son of Franco's other signature character, Dr. Orloff, in 1982's The Sinister Dr. Orloff. After the director's death in 2013, he carried his ashes during a final homage held at his hometown cinema in Málaga.

Through Jesús Franco, Mayans started working for French company Eurociné, of whom he became a favorite, even when Franco was not involved. Eurociné gave him the anglophone alias "Robert Foster", a quasi homonym of American actor Robert Forster. The racier titles Mayans had appeared in occasionally became mixed up with the American actor's filmography, which caused the latter a few uncomfortable moments. According to the American Forster, Mayans told him that the name had been given to him because they looked alike. However, Eurociné boss Daniel Lesoeur makes no mention of this. Both actors ended up sharing the screen on the 1988 Eurociné production Countdown to Esmeralda Bay.

As the Spanish B-movie industry withered in the 1990s, Mayans found his most significant work in television series while his later features, including collaborations with another cult figure, Paul Naschy, did not always find wide distribution. (Mayans co-starred in Naschy's 1973 film The People Who Own The Dark as well as Naschy's posthumously released Empusa.) However, the actor returned to public attention in 2023 with the film I'll Crush Y'all, whose director Kike Narcea paid tribute to the glory days of Spanish exploitation by casting him and fellow genre veteran Lone Fleming.

=== Theater ===
Although he mostly worked in film and television, Mayans did participate in several stage productions, most notably the first Spanish presentation of Hair and the national classic Life is a Dream. The latter play also gave its name to La vida es sueño, a filmmaking masterclass he hosted in Madrid for production company Artistic Films in 2021.

=== Production ===
Since the 1980s, Mayans has also worked behind the scenes in many capacities. He was primarily identified as a production manager, but also served as dubbing director, often working out of Madrid's Arcofón studio. Actor William Berger commanded him for greatly streamlining Jesús Franco's hectic production process. Mayans also assisted Franco with sales and finished his final film, 2013's Revenge of the Alligator Ladies, after his death.

== Accolades ==
In 2011, Mayans was honored by Cinemad, the sister event of music festival Festimad, as one of Spain's emblematic character actors, alongside Aldo Sambrell, es:Carlos Lucas and es:Terele Pavez. Mayans, who acted in several Euro Westerns during the genre's heyday, was named a juror for the 2012 Almería Western Film Festival. In 2016, he was a guest of honor at the XI International Fantastic Film Festival in Porto Alegre, Brazil. On this occasion, the company behind the event produced an English-language short film where the actor plays a fictionalized version of himself, called Bring Me the Head of Antonio Mayans and released the following year.

== Personal life ==
Mayans was born in València and grew up on the city's es:Gran Vía del Marqués del Turia. He originally contemplated a career in accounting but proved a mediocre student. As a result, he opted to learn English, for which he traveled to London. There, he attended acting seminars offered by the Royal Academy of Dramatic Art. Mayans was married to Juana de la Morena, herself an actress and later makeup artist for Jesus Franco. He had three daughters, Flavia, Ivana and Regina, all of whom collaborated to his film career to varying degrees.
